= List of governors of North Dakota =

Flag of the governor

The governor of North Dakota is the head of government of the U.S. state of North Dakota. The governor is the head of the executive branch of North Dakota's state government and is charged with enforcing state laws.

There have been 32 governors since North Dakota became a state, serving 33 distinct terms, with William Langer having been elected to multiple terms. The current officeholder is Republican Kelly Armstrong.

== Governors ==
Dakota Territory was organized on March 2, 1861; on November 2, 1889, it was split into the states of North Dakota and South Dakota.

The Constitution of North Dakota originally provided for the election of a governor and lieutenant governor every two years, which was changed to four years in 1964. A limit of two terms was added in 2023. The governor and lieutenant governor are elected together on a ticket, and should the office of governor become vacant, the lieutenant governor becomes governor. The term of office begins on the December 15 following the election.

Governors of the State of North Dakota
No.	Governor	Term in office	Party	Election	Lt. Governor (Note: Lieutenant governors represented the same party as their governor unless noted.)
1	John Miller (1843–1908)	November 20, 1889 – January 7, 1891 (414 days; retired)	Republican	1889	Alfred Dickey
2	Andrew H. Burke (1850–1918)	January 7, 1891 – January 4, 1893 (729 days; lost election)	Republican	1890	Roger Allin
3	Eli C. D. Shortridge (1830–1908)	January 4, 1893 (Note: Sources disagree on when Shortridge took office; Sobel & Raimo say January 2, the State Historical Society says January 3, one contemporary news source says Shortridge qualified on January 3, and Shortridge delivered his inaugural address (dated January 3) to the legislature on January 4.) – January 9, 1895 (736 days; retired)	Populist	1892	Elmer D. Wallace (Note: Represented the Democratic-Independent Party)
4	Roger Allin (1848–1936)	January 9, 1895 – January 7, 1897 (730 days; lost nomination)	Republican	1894	John H. Worst
5	Frank A. Briggs (1858–1898)	January 7, 1897 (Note: Sources disagree on when Briggs took office; Sobel & Raimo say January 8, the State Historical Society says January 6, and a contemporary news source says he was sworn in on January 7, which notes that inaugural proceedings were delayed by the death of Briggs' daughter.) – August 9, 1898 (580 days; died in office)	Republican	1896	Joseph M. Devine
6	Joseph M. Devine (1861–1938)	August 9, 1898 – January 3, 1899 (148 days; retired)	Republican	Succeeded from lieutenant governor	Vacant
7	Frederick B. Fancher (1852–1944)	January 3, 1899 – January 7, 1901 (735 days; withdrew) (Note: Fancher was nominated by the Republican Party, but withdrew from the election due to health concerns.)	Republican	1898	Joseph M. Devine
8	Frank White (1856–1940)	January 7, 1901 – January 4, 1905 (1459 days; retired)	Republican	1900	David Bartlett
8	Frank White (1856–1940)	January 7, 1901 – January 4, 1905 (1459 days; retired)	Republican	1902	David Bartlett
9	Elmore Y. Sarles (1859–1929)	January 4, 1905 – January 9, 1907 (736 days; lost election)	Republican	1904	David Bartlett
10	John Burke (1859–1937)	January 9, 1907 – January 8, 1913 (2192 days; retired)	Democratic	1906	Robert S. Lewis
10	John Burke (1859–1937)	January 9, 1907 – January 8, 1913 (2192 days; retired)	Democratic	1908	Robert S. Lewis
10	John Burke (1859–1937)	January 9, 1907 – January 8, 1913 (2192 days; retired)	Democratic	1910	Usher L. Burdick
11	L. B. Hanna (1861–1948)	January 8, 1913 – January 3, 1917 (1457 days; retired)	Republican	1912	Anton Kraabel
11	L. B. Hanna (1861–1948)	January 8, 1913 – January 3, 1917 (1457 days; retired)	Republican	1914	John H. Fraine
12	Lynn Frazier (1874–1947)	January 3, 1917 – November 23, 1921 (1786 days; recalled) (Note: Frazier was recalled and Nestos elected to replace him in a special election.)	Republican/ Nonpartisan League	1916	Anton Kraabel
12	Lynn Frazier (1874–1947)	January 3, 1917 – November 23, 1921 (1786 days; recalled)	Republican/ Nonpartisan League	1918	Howard R. Wood
12	Lynn Frazier (1874–1947)	January 3, 1917 – November 23, 1921 (1786 days; recalled)	Republican/ Nonpartisan League	1920	Howard R. Wood
13	Ragnvald Nestos (1877–1942)	November 23, 1921 – January 7, 1925 (1142 days; lost nomination)	Republican/ Independent Voters	1921 (recall)	Howard R. Wood
13	Ragnvald Nestos (1877–1942)	November 23, 1921 – January 7, 1925 (1142 days; lost nomination)	Republican/ Independent Voters	1922	Frank H. Hyland
14	Arthur G. Sorlie (1874–1928)	January 7, 1925 – August 28, 1928 (1330 days; died in office)	Republican/ Nonpartisan League	1924	Walter Maddock
14	Arthur G. Sorlie (1874–1928)	January 7, 1925 – August 28, 1928 (1330 days; died in office)	Republican/ Nonpartisan League	1926	Walter Maddock
15	Walter Maddock (1880–1951)	August 28, 1928 – January 9, 1929 (135 days; lost election)	Republican/ Nonpartisan League	Succeeded from lieutenant governor	Vacant
15	Walter Maddock (1880–1951)	August 28, 1928 – January 9, 1929 (135 days; lost election)	Democratic/ Nonpartisan League (Note: Maddock switched parties to run in the 1928 election.)	Succeeded from lieutenant governor	Vacant
16	George F. Shafer (1888–1948)	January 9, 1929 – January 4, 1933 (1457 days; retired) (Note: Shafer instead ran unsuccessfully for the Republican nomination to the United States Senate.)	Republican/ Independent Voters	1928	John W. Carr
16	George F. Shafer (1888–1948)	January 9, 1929 – January 4, 1933 (1457 days; retired)	Republican/ Independent Voters	1930	John W. Carr
17	William Langer (1886–1959)	January 4, 1933 (Note: Sources disagree on when Langer took office; the State Historical Society says December 31, 1932, but contemporary news indicates it was on January 4, 1933, the matter being complicated because Langer was ill and unable to attend..) – July 19, 1934 (562 days; removed) (Note: Langer was removed from office following his conviction of felony conspiracy to defraud the federal government; he was later cleared. He was convicted on June 17 and Lieutenant Governor Ole H. Olson immediately moved to take over, receiving the oath of office. The Supreme Court ruled Langer was ineligible on July 17, and Olson formally took office on July 19. Langer had received the Republican nomination for the 1934 election and so withdrew, with his wife Lydia running in his stead.)	Republican/ Nonpartisan League	1932	Ole H. Olson
18	Ole H. Olson (1872–1954)	July 19, 1934 – January 7, 1935 (173 days; retired)	Republican/ Nonpartisan League	Succeeded from lieutenant governor	Vacant
19	Thomas H. Moodie (1878–1948)	January 7, 1935 – February 2, 1935 (27 days; removed) (Note: The Supreme Court ruled that Moodie did not meet residency requirements to run for governor, and so removed him.)	Democratic	1934	Walter Welford
20	Walter Welford (1868–1952)	February 2, 1935 – January 6, 1937 (705 days; lost election)	Republican/ Nonpartisan League	Succeeded from lieutenant governor	Vacant
21	William Langer (1886–1959)	January 6, 1937 – January 2, 1939 (727 days; retired) (Note: Langer instead ran unsuccessfully for the United States Senate.)	Independent	1936	Thorstein H. H. Thoresen
22	John Moses (1885–1945)	January 2, 1939 – January 2, 1945 (2193 days; retired) (Note: Moses was instead elected to the United States Senate.)	Democratic	1938	Jack A. Patterson
22	John Moses (1885–1945)	January 2, 1939 – January 2, 1945 (2193 days; retired)	Democratic	1940	Oscar W. Hagen
22	John Moses (1885–1945)	January 2, 1939 – January 2, 1945 (2193 days; retired)	Democratic	1942	Henry Holt
23	Fred G. Aandahl (1897–1966)	January 2, 1945 – January 3, 1951 (2193 days; retired) (Note: Aandahl was instead elected to the United States House of Representatives.)	Republican	1944	Clarence P. Dahl
23	Fred G. Aandahl (1897–1966)	January 2, 1945 – January 3, 1951 (2193 days; retired)	Republican	1946	Clarence P. Dahl
23	Fred G. Aandahl (1897–1966)	January 2, 1945 – January 3, 1951 (2193 days; retired)	Republican	1948	Clarence P. Dahl
24	Norman Brunsdale (1891–1978)	January 3, 1951 – January 7, 1957 (2197 days; retired)	Republican	1950	Ray Schnell
24	Norman Brunsdale (1891–1978)	January 3, 1951 – January 7, 1957 (2197 days; retired)	Republican	1952	Clarence P. Dahl
24	Norman Brunsdale (1891–1978)	January 3, 1951 – January 7, 1957 (2197 days; retired)	Republican	1954	Clarence P. Dahl
25	John E. Davis (1913–1990)	January 7, 1957 – January 3, 1961 (1458 days; retired) (Note: Davis instead ran unsuccessfully for the United States Senate.)	Republican	1956	Francis Clyde Duffy
25	John E. Davis (1913–1990)	January 7, 1957 – January 3, 1961 (1458 days; retired)	Republican	1958	Clarence P. Dahl
26	William L. Guy (1919–2013)	January 3, 1961 – January 2, 1973 (4383 days; retired)	Democratic– Nonpartisan League	1960	Orville W. Hagen
26	William L. Guy (1919–2013)	January 3, 1961 – January 2, 1973 (4383 days; retired)	Democratic– Nonpartisan League	1962	Frank A. Wenstrom
26	William L. Guy (1919–2013)	January 3, 1961 – January 2, 1973 (4383 days; retired)	Democratic– Nonpartisan League	1964	Charles Tighe
26	William L. Guy (1919–2013)	January 3, 1961 – January 2, 1973 (4383 days; retired)	Democratic– Nonpartisan League	1968	Richard F. Larsen
27	Arthur A. Link (1914–2010)	January 2, 1973 – January 6, 1981 (2927 days; lost election)	Democratic– Nonpartisan League	1972	Wayne Sanstead
27	Arthur A. Link (1914–2010)	January 2, 1973 – January 6, 1981 (2927 days; lost election)	Democratic– Nonpartisan League	1976	Wayne Sanstead
28	Allen I. Olson (1938–2025)	January 6, 1981 – December 31, 1984 (1456 days; lost election)	Republican	1980	Ernest Sands
29	George A. Sinner (1928–2018)	January 1, 1985 (Note: Sinner took the oath of office on December 31, so that he would become governor at midnight on January 1; Olson claimed that his term did not end until January 5, and refused to leave office. The Supreme Court ruled on January 4 that Sinner was governor, and had been since January 1.) – December 15, 1992 (2906 days; retired)	Democratic– Nonpartisan League	1984	Ruth Meiers
29	George A. Sinner (1928–2018)	January 1, 1985 – December 15, 1992 (2906 days; retired)	Democratic– Nonpartisan League	1988	Lloyd Omdahl
30	Ed Schafer (b. 1946)	December 15, 1992 – December 15, 2000 (2923 days; retired)	Republican	1992	Rosemarie Myrdal
30	Ed Schafer (b. 1946)	December 15, 1992 – December 15, 2000 (2923 days; retired)	Republican	1996	Rosemarie Myrdal
31	John Hoeven (b. 1957)	December 15, 2000 – December 7, 2010 (3645 days; resigned) (Note: Hoeven resigned, having been elected to the United States Senate.)	Republican	2000	Jack Dalrymple
31	John Hoeven (b. 1957)	December 15, 2000 – December 7, 2010 (3645 days; resigned)	Republican	2004	Jack Dalrymple
31	John Hoeven (b. 1957)	December 15, 2000 – December 7, 2010 (3645 days; resigned)	Republican	2008	Jack Dalrymple
32	Jack Dalrymple (b. 1948)	December 7, 2010 – December 15, 2016 (2201 days; retired)	Republican	Succeeded from lieutenant governor	Drew Wrigley
32	Jack Dalrymple (b. 1948)	December 7, 2010 – December 15, 2016 (2201 days; retired)	Republican	2012	Drew Wrigley
33	Doug Burgum (b. 1956)	December 15, 2016 – December 15, 2024 (2923 days; retired)	Republican	2016	Brent Sanford
33	Doug Burgum (b. 1956)	December 15, 2016 – December 15, 2024 (2923 days; retired)	Republican	2020	Brent Sanford
33	Doug Burgum (b. 1956)	December 15, 2016 – December 15, 2024 (2923 days; retired)	Republican	2020	Tammy Miller
34	Kelly Armstrong (b. 1976)	December 15, 2024 – Incumbent (Note: Armstrong's term will expire on December 15, 2028.) (in office 708 days)	Republican	2024	Michelle Strinden

== Electoral history (1950–) ==
Year	Democratic–NPL nominee			Republican nominee			Independent candidate			Libertarian nominee			Other candidate		
Year	Candidate	#	%	Candidate	#	%	Candidate	#	%	Candidate	#	%	Candidate	#	%
1950	Clyde G. Byerly	61,950	33.71%	Norman Brunsdale	121,822	66.29%	–			–			–		
1952	Ole C. Johnson	53,990	21.26%	Norman Brunsdale	199,944	78.74%	–			–			–		
1954	Cornelius Bymers	69,248	35.79%	Norman Brunsdale	124,253	64.21%	–			–			–		
1956	Wallace E. Warner	104,869	41.54%	John E. Davis	147,566	58.46%	–			–			–		
1958	John F. Lord	98,763	46.90%	John E. Davis	111,836	53.10%	–			–			–		
1960	William L. Guy	136,148	49.44%	Clarence P. Dahl	122,486	44.48%	Herschel Lashkowitz	16,741	6.08%	–			–		
1962	William L. Guy	115,258	50.44%	Mark Andrews	113,251	49.56%	–			–			–		
1964	William L. Guy	146,414	55.74%	Donald M. Halcrow	116,247	44.26%	–			–			–		
1968	William L. Guy	135,955	54.82%	Robert P. McCarney	108,382	43.70%	Leo Landsberger (Taxpayers Revival)	3,663	1.48%	–			–		
1972	Arthur A. Link	143,899	51.04%	Richard F. Larsen	138,032	48.96%	–			–			–		
1976	Arthur A. Link	153,309	51.58%	Richard Elkin	138,321	46.53%	–			–			Martin K. Vaaler (American)	5,619	1.89%
1980	Arthur A. Link	140,391	46.39%	Allen I. Olson	162,230	53.61%	–			–			–		
1984	George A. Sinner	173,922	55.32%	Allen I. Olson	140,460	44.68%	–			–			–		
1988	George A. Sinner	179,094	59.88%	Leon Malberg	119,986	40.12%	–			–			–		
1992	Nicholas Spaeth	123,845	40.62%	Ed Schafer	176,398	57.86%	Harley McClain	2,614	0.86%	–			Michael DuPaul	2,004	0.66%
1996	Lee Kaldor	89,349	33.81%	Ed Schafer	174,937	66.19%	–			–			–		
2000	Heidi Heitkamp	130,144	44.97%	John Hoeven	159,255	55.03%	–			–			–		
2004	Joe Satrom	84,877	27.39%	John Hoeven	220,803	71.26%	–			Roland Riemers	4,193	1.35%	–		
2008	Tim Mathern	74,279	23.53%	John Hoeven	235,009	74.44%	DuWayne Hendrickson	6,404	2.03%	–			–		
2012	Ryan Taylor	109,048	34.31%	Jack Dalrymple	200,525	63.10%	Paul Sorum	5,356	1.69%	–			Roland Riemers	2,618	0.82%
2016	Marvin Nelson	65,855	19.39%	Doug Burgum	259,863	76.52%	–			Marty Riske	13,230	3.90%	–		
2020	Shelley Lenz	90,789	25.38%	Doug Burgum	235,479	65.84%	–			DuWayne Hendrickson	13,853	3.87%	–		
2024	Merrill Piepkorn	94,043	25.98%	Kelly Armstrong	247,056	68.26%	Michael Coachman	20,322	5.61%	–			–		

== See also ==
- Gubernatorial lines of succession in the United States § North Dakota
- First ladies of North Dakota
- Lieutenant Governor of North Dakota
- List of governors of Dakota Territory
- List of North Dakota Legislative Assemblies

== Sources ==
- "Former North Dakota Governors". National Governors Association.
- "North Dakota Constitution". State Democracy Research Initiative. University of Wisconsin Law School.
- Glashan, Roy R. (1979). American Governors and Gubernatorial Elections, 1775-1978. Meckler Books. ISBN 0-7201-1511-6 – via Internet Archive.
- Kallenbach, Joseph E.; Kallenbach, Jessamine S. (1977). American State Governors, 1776-1976. Oceana Publications. ISBN 978-0-379-00665-0 – via Internet Archive.
- Mullaney, Marie Marmo (1994). Biographical Directory of the Governors of the United States, 1988–1994. Greenwood Publishing Group. ISBN 0-313-28312-5 – via Internet Archive.
- Sobel, Robert; Raimo, John (1978). Biographical Directory of the Governors of the United States, 1789-1978. Vol. 3. Meckler Books. ISBN 0-930466-01-2 – via Internet Archive.
- Thorpe, Francis Newton, ed. (1909). The Federal and State Constitutions, Colonial Charters, and Other Organic Laws of the States, Territories, and Colonies Now or Heretofore Forming the United States of America. Vol. 5. United States Government Publishing Office – via Internet Archive.
