= 1984 United States gubernatorial elections =

- November 6, 1984

15 governorships 13 states; 2 territories
	Majority party	Minority party
Party	Democratic	Republican
Seats before	35	15
Seats after	34	16
Seat change	▼1	▲1
Seats up	6	7
Seats won	5	8
- Republican hold Republican gain Democratic hold Democratic gain

United States gubernatorial elections were held on November 6, 1984, in 13 states and two territories. The Republicans had a net gain of one seat in this election, which coincided with the Senate, House elections and presidential election.

This was the last year in which Arkansas held a gubernatorial election in the same year as the presidential election. The length of gubernatorial terms for Arkansas' governor would be extended from two years to four years with elections taking place in midterm election years following the passage of the Sixty-third Amendment to the Arkansas Constitution.

== Election results ==
State	Incumbent	Party	First elected	Result	Candidates
Arkansas	Bill Clinton	Democratic	1978; 1980 (defeated); 1982	Incumbent re-elected.	✓ Bill Clinton (Democratic) 62.5%; Woody Freeman (Republican) 37.4%
Delaware	Pete du Pont	Republican	1976	Incumbent term-limited. New governor elected. Republican hold.	✓ Mike Castle (Republican) 55.0%; William J. Quillen (Democratic) 45.0%
Indiana	Robert D. Orr	Republican	1980	Incumbent re-elected.	✓ Robert D. Orr (Republican) 52.16%; Wayne Townsend (Democratic) 47.18%; Rockland Snyder (American) 0.34%; James A. Ridenour (Libertarian) 0.32%
Missouri	Kit Bond	Republican	1980	Incumbent retired. New governor elected. Republican hold.	✓ John Ashcroft (Republican) 56.7%; Ken Rothman (Democratic) 43.3%
Montana	Ted Schwinden	Democratic	1980	Incumbent re-elected.	✓ Ted Schwinden (Democratic) 70.3%; Pat M. Goodover (Republican) 26.4%; Larry Dodge (Libertarian) 3.3%
New Hampshire	John H. Sununu	Republican	1982	Incumbent re-elected.	✓ John H. Sununu (Republican) 66.8%; Chris Spirou (Democratic) 33.1%
North Carolina	Jim Hunt	Democratic	1976	Incumbent term-limited. New governor elected. Republican gain.	✓ James G. Martin (Republican) 54.3%; Rufus L. Edmisten (Democratic) 45.4%
North Dakota	Allen I. Olson	Republican	1980	Incumbent lost re-election. New governor elected. Democratic-NPL gain.	✓ George A. Sinner (Democratic-NPL) 55.3%; Allen I. Olson (Republican) 44.7%
Rhode Island	J. Joseph Garrahy	Democratic	1976	Incumbent retired. New governor elected. Republican gain.	✓ Edward D. DiPrete (Republican) 60.0%; Anthony J. Solomon (Democratic) 40.0%
Utah	Scott M. Matheson	Democratic	1976	Incumbent retired. New governor elected. Republican gain.	✓ Norman H. Bangerter (Republican) 55.9%; Wayne Owens (Democratic) 43.8%
Vermont	Richard A. Snelling	Republican	1982	Incumbent retired. New governor elected. Democratic gain.	✓ Madeleine Kunin (Democratic) 50.0%; John J. Easton Jr. (Republican) 48.5%; William E. Wicker (Libertarian) 0.8%
Washington	John Spellman	Republican	1980	Incumbent lost re-election. New governor elected. Democratic gain.	✓ Booth Gardner (Democratic) 53.3%; John Spellman (Republican) 46.7%
West Virginia	Jay Rockefeller	Democratic	1976	Incumbent term-limited to run for U.S. Senator. New governor elected. Republican gain.	✓ Arch A. Moore Jr. (Republican) 53.3%; Clyde See (Democratic) 46.7%

=== Territories ===
Territory	Incumbent	Party	First elected	Result	Candidates
Puerto Rico	Carlos Romero Barceló	New Progressive	1976	Incumbent lost re-election. Popular Democratic gain.	▌ ✓ Rafael Hernández Colón (PPD) 47.75%; ▌ Carlos Romero Barceló (PNP) 44.63%

== Close states ==
States where the margin of victory was under 5%:

1. Vermont, 1.5%
2. Puerto Rico, 3.2%
3. Indiana, 4.98%

States where the margin of victory was under 10%:

1. Washington, 6.6%
2. West Virginia, 6.6%
3. North Carolina, 8.9%

== Arkansas ==
1984 Arkansas gubernatorial election
- November 6, 1984
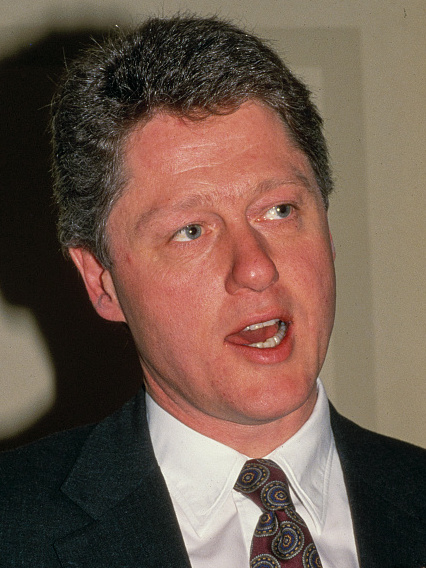

Nominee	Bill Clinton	Woody Freeman
Party	Democratic	Republican
Popular vote	554,561	331,987
Percentage	62.55%	37.45%
- County results Clinton: 50–60% 60–70% 70–80% 80–90% Freeman: 50–60%
Governor before election
Bill Clinton
Democratic
Elected Governor
Bill Clinton
Democratic

The 1984 Arkansas gubernatorial election was held on November 6, 1984. Incumbent Governor Bill Clinton won reelection with a 25% margin of victory over Jonesboro businessman Woody Freeman. This was the last gubernatorial election in Arkansas before the implementation of Amendment 63, lengthening the term of the governor of Arkansas from two to four years. Winning his third of five terms as Governor of Arkansas, Clinton continued to serve this office until shortly after he was elected to the presidency in 1992.

== Delaware ==
1984 Delaware gubernatorial election
- November 6, 1984
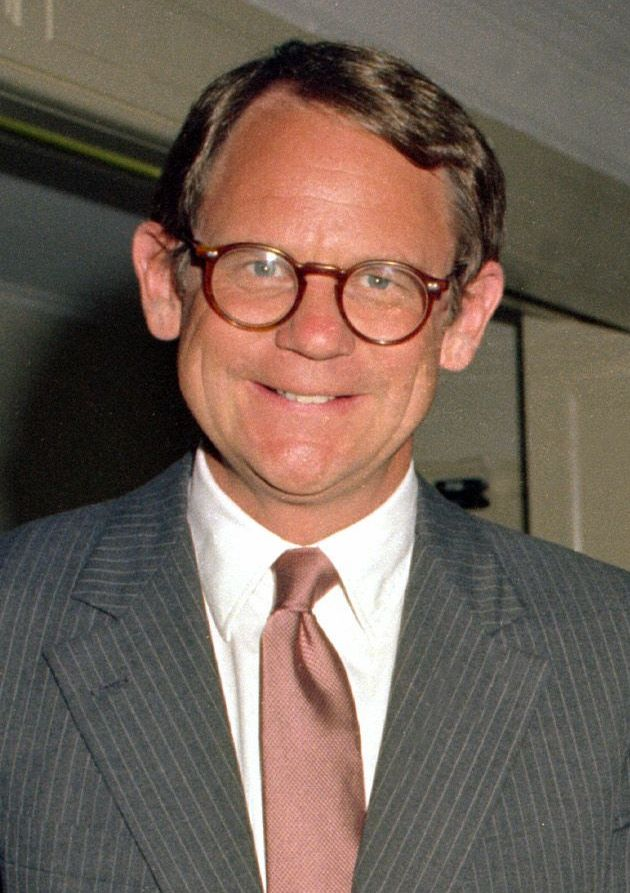

Nominee	Mike Castle	William T. Quillen
Party	Republican	Democratic
Popular vote	135,250	108,315
Percentage	55.53%	44.47%
- Castle: 50–60% 60–70% 70–80% Quillen: 50–60% 60–70% 80–90%
Governor before election
Pierre S. duPont IV
Republican
Elected Governor
Mike Castle
Republican

The 1984 Delaware gubernatorial election took place on November 6, 1984. Incumbent Republican governor Pierre S. duPont IV was barred from seeking a third term in office. Lieutenant Governor Mike Castle was elected to succeed him, defeating State Supreme Court Justice William T. Quillen.

== Indiana ==
1984 Indiana gubernatorial election
- November 6, 1984
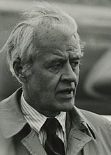

Nominee	Robert D. Orr	Wayne Townsend
Party	Republican	Democratic
Running mate	John Mutz	Ann DeLaney
Popular vote	1,146,497	1,036,922
Percentage	52.2%	47.2%
- County results Orr: 50–60% 60–70% Townsend: 40–50% 50–60% 60–70%
Governor before election
Robert D. Orr
Republican
Elected Governor
Robert D. Orr
Republican

The 1984 Indiana gubernatorial election was held on November 6, 1984, in all 92 counties of Indiana. Robert D. Orr, the state's incumbent Republican governor, who defeated former State Treasurer John Snyder for the nomination, was comfortably reelected to a second term, defeating State Senator Wayne Townsend and two minor party challengers in the general election.

== Missouri ==
1984 Missouri gubernatorial election
- November 6, 1984
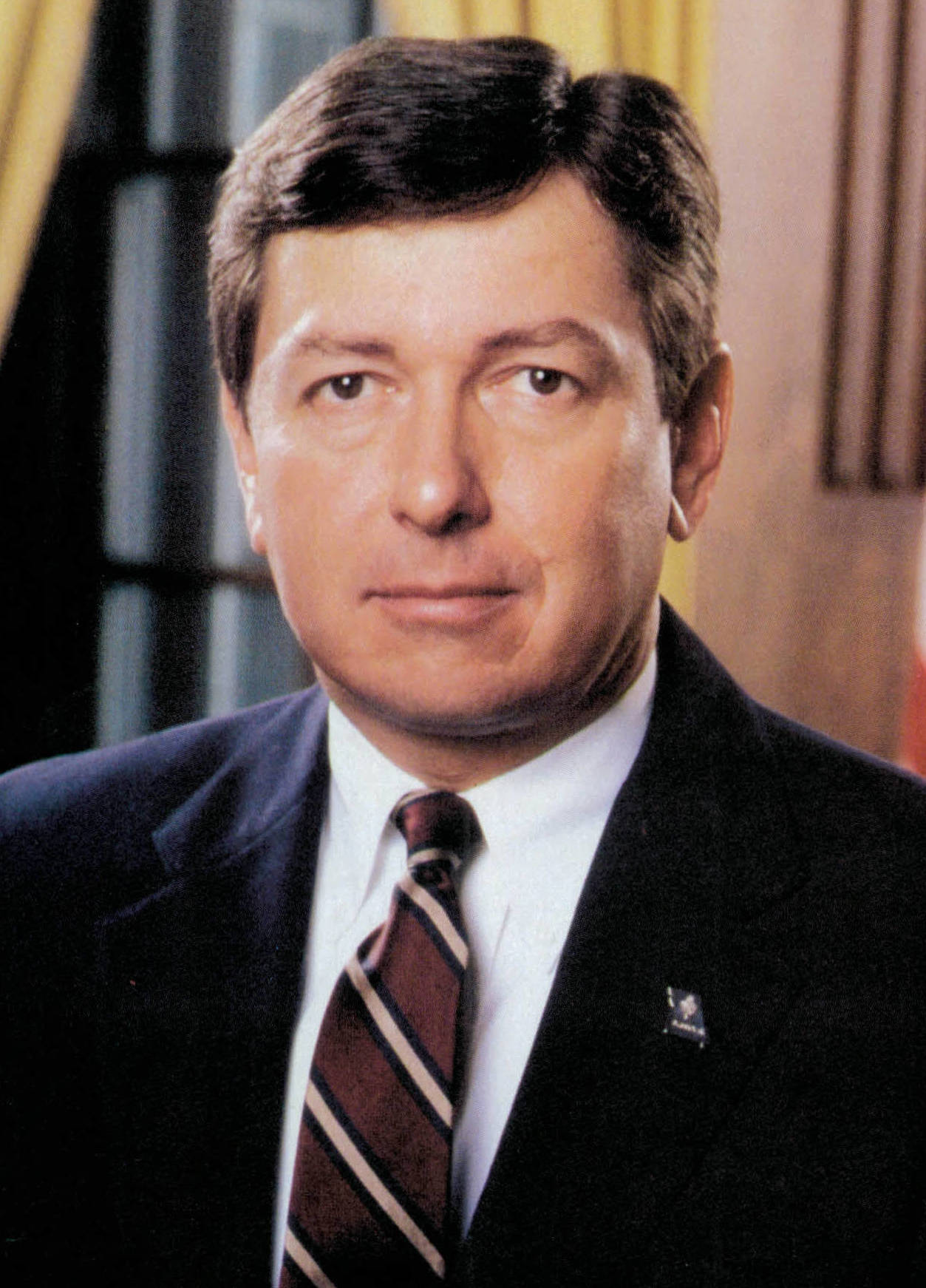

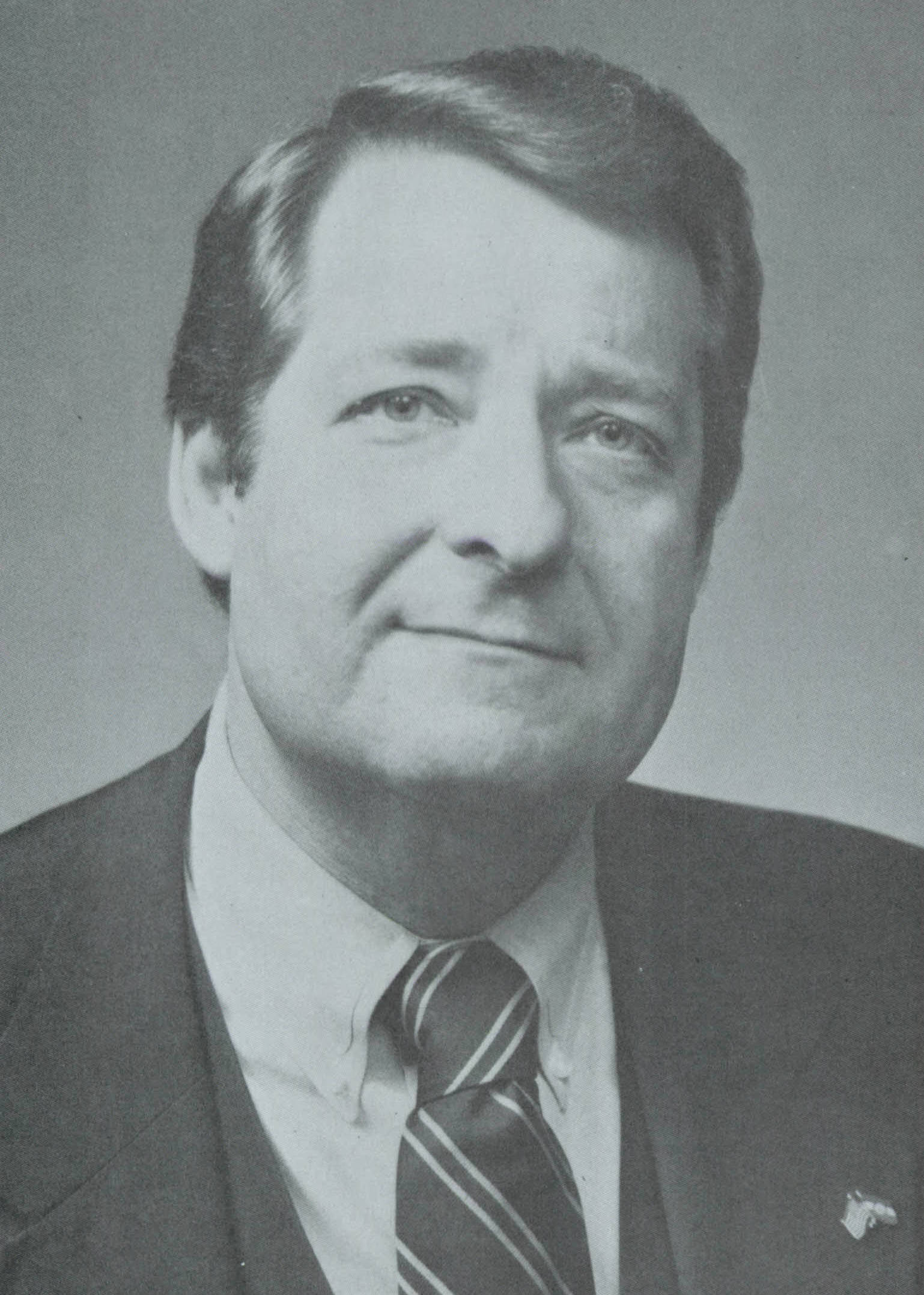
Nominee	John Ashcroft	Ken Rothman
Party	Republican	Democratic
Popular vote	1,194,506	913,700
Percentage	56.7%	43.3%
- County results Ashcroft: 50-60% 60-70% 70-80% Rothman: 50–60% 60–70%
Governor before election
Kit Bond
Republican
Elected Governor
John Ashcroft
Republican

The 1984 Missouri gubernatorial election was held on November 6, 1984 and resulted in a victory for the Republican nominee, Missouri Attorney General John Ashcroft, over the Democratic candidate, Lt. Governor Ken Rothman, and Independent Bob Allen. Incumbent Republican Governor Kit Bond, who was elected to the Governorship in 1972, but lost re-election in 1976 before regaining the office in 1980, chose not to seek a third non-consecutive term.

== Montana ==
1984 Montana gubernatorial election
- November 6, 1984
- Turnout: 75.00%▲0.10
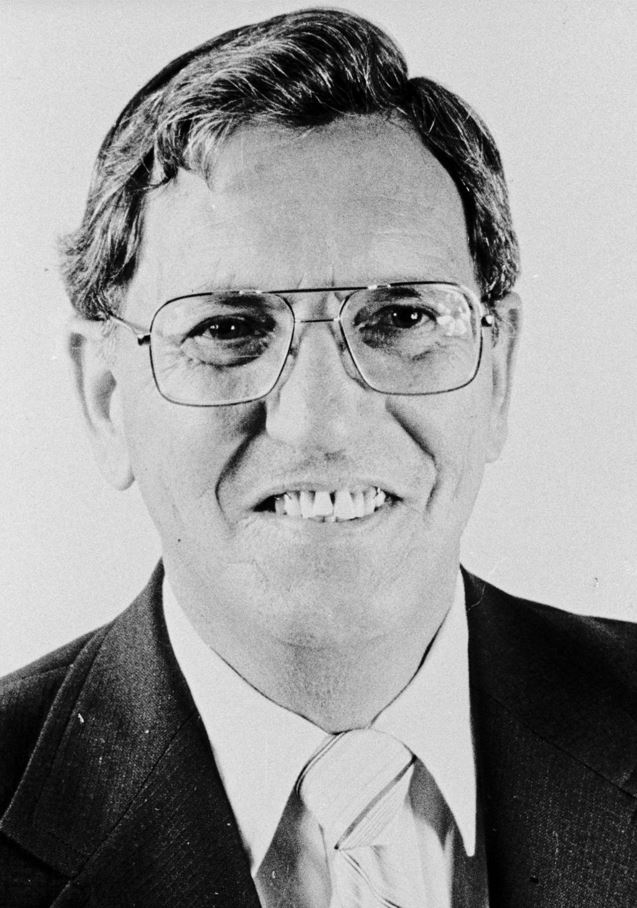

Nominee	Ted Schwinden	Pat M. Goodover
Party	Democratic	Republican
Running mate	George Turman	Don Allen
Popular vote	266,578	100,070
Percentage	70.34%	26.41%
- County results Schwinden: 50–60% 60–70% 70–80% 80–90%
Governor before election
Ted Schwinden
Democratic
Elected Governor
Ted Schwinden
Democratic

The 1984 Montana gubernatorial election took place on November 6, 1984. Incumbent Governor of Montana Ted Schwinden, who was first elected in 1980, ran for re-election. Schwinden won the Democratic primary against a perennial candidate, and moved on to the general election, where he faced Pat M. Goodover, a State Senator and the Republican nominee. Although then-President Ronald Reagan won the state in a landslide that year in the presidential election, Schwinden defeated Goodover with over 70% of the vote to win his second and final term as governor.

== New Hampshire ==
1984 New Hampshire gubernatorial election
- November 6, 1984
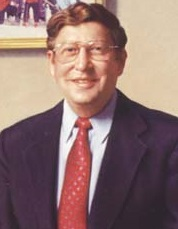

Nominee	John H. Sununu	Chris Spirou
Party	Republican	Democratic
Popular vote	256,574	127,156
Percentage	66.86%	33.14%
- Sununu: 50–60% 60–70% 70–80% 80–90% >90% Spirou: 50–60% 80–90% >90%
Governor before election
John H. Sununu
Republican
Elected Governor
John H. Sununu
Republican

The 1984 New Hampshire gubernatorial election took place on November 6, 1984. Incumbent Governor John Sununu was re-elected to a second term in office.

== North Carolina ==
1984 North Carolina gubernatorial election
- November 6, 1984
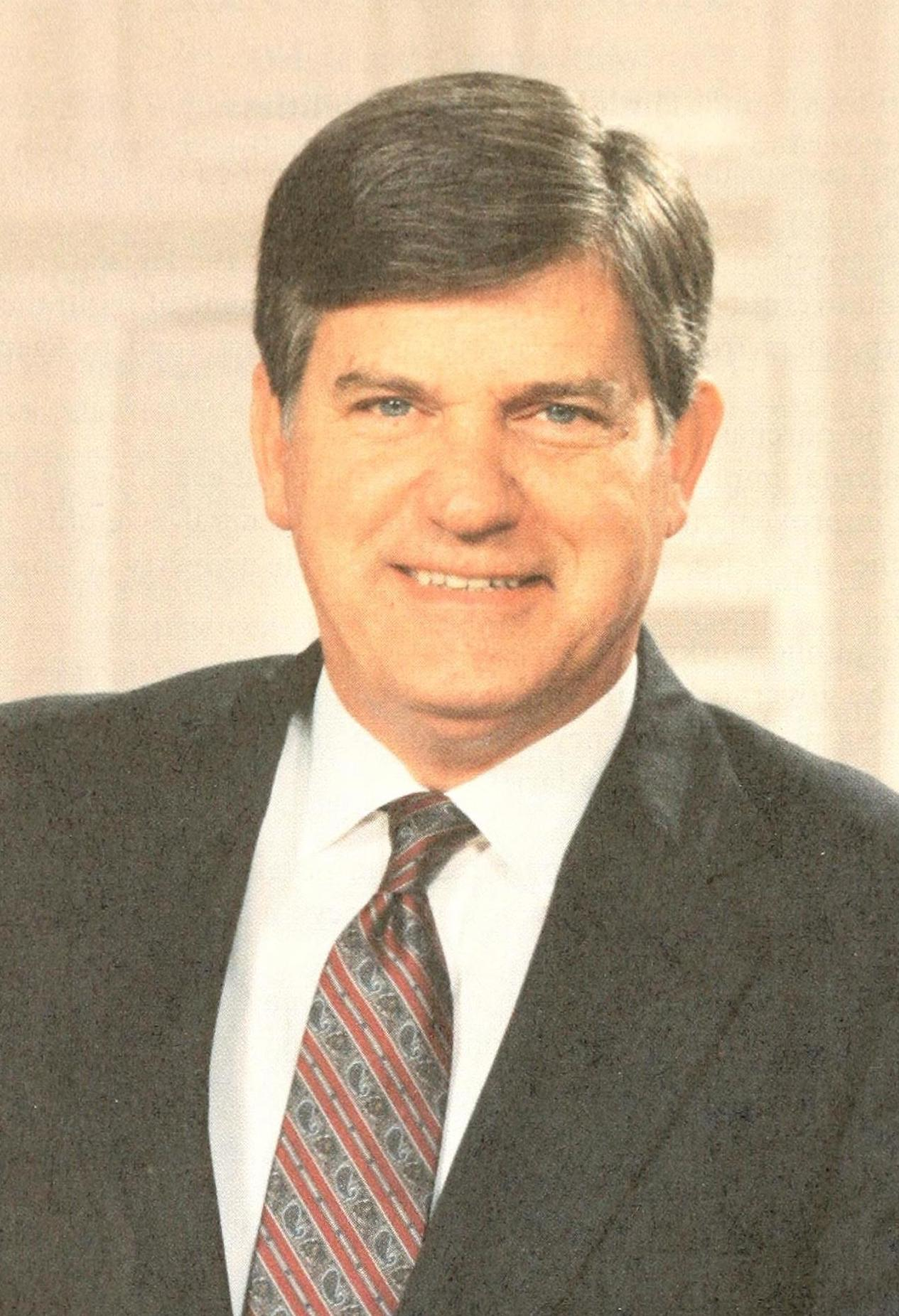

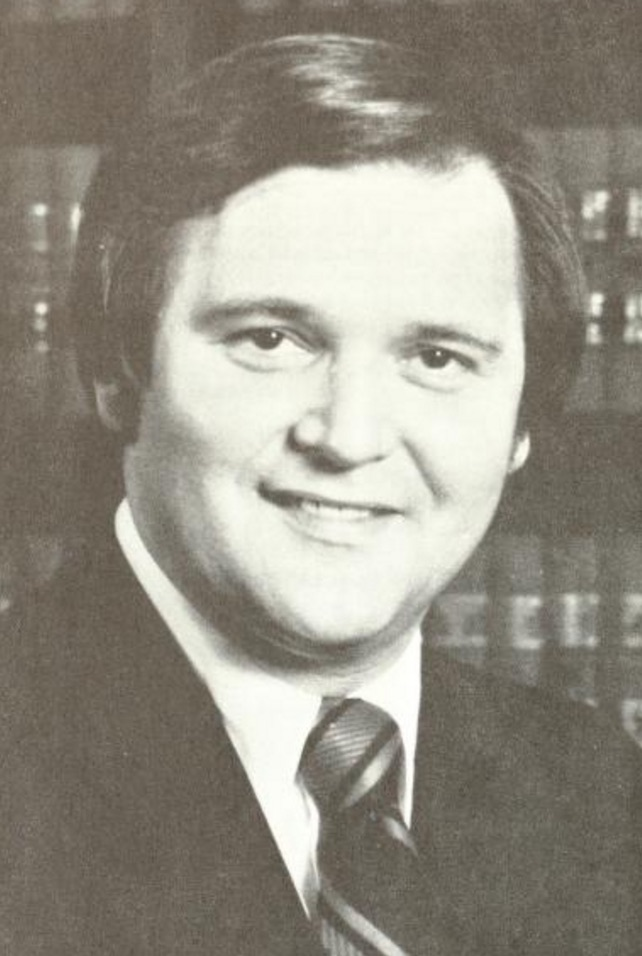
Nominee	James G. Martin	Rufus L. Edmisten
Party	Republican	Democratic
Popular vote	1,208,167	1,011,209
Percentage	54.26%	45.41%
- County results Martin: 50-60% 60-70% 70-80% Edmisten: 50-60% 60-70% 70-80%
Governor before election
Jim Hunt
Democratic
Elected Governor
James G. Martin
Republican

The 1984 North Carolina gubernatorial election was held on November 6, 1984. Democratic incumbent Jim Hunt was unable to run for another consecutive term under the North Carolina Constitution. Hunt ran instead for the U.S. Senate against Jesse Helms and lost, although he later announced his campaign for a third gubernatorial term in the 1992 election. Popular 9th District Congressman James G. Martin ran as the Republican nominee against Democratic Attorney General Rufus L. Edmisten, who defeated Hunt's Lt. Governor, James Green, among other candidates, in a hotly contested primary.

Martin won by a comfortable margin on Election Day thanks to the surprise endorsement of Green, and to President Ronald Reagan's coattails (see also 1984 United States presidential election). Martin became just the second Republican elected to the state's highest office in the 20th century.

== North Dakota ==
1984 North Dakota gubernatorial election
- November 6, 1984
- Turnout: 314,382
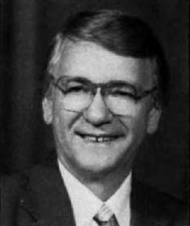

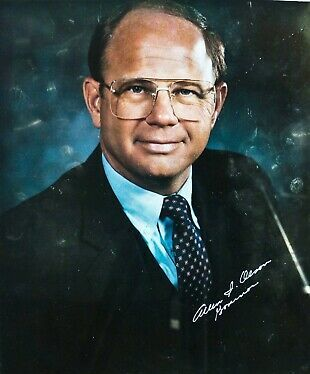
Nominee	George A. Sinner	Allen I. Olson
Party	Democratic–NPL	Republican
Running mate	Ruth Meiers	Ernest Sands
Popular vote	173,922	140,460
Percentage	55.3%	44.7%
- County results Sinner: 50–60% 60–70% Olsen: 50–60% 60–70%
Governor before election
Allen I. Olson
Republican
Elected Governor
George A. Sinner
Democratic–NPL

The 1984 North Dakota gubernatorial election took place on November 6, 1984 to elect the Governor and Lieutenant Governor of North Dakota. Voters selected Democratic candidate George A. Sinner and his running mate Ruth Meiers in a landslide over Republican incumbent Governor Allen I. Olson and Lieutenant Governor Ernest Sands.

== Rhode Island ==
1984 Rhode Island gubernatorial election
- November 6, 1984
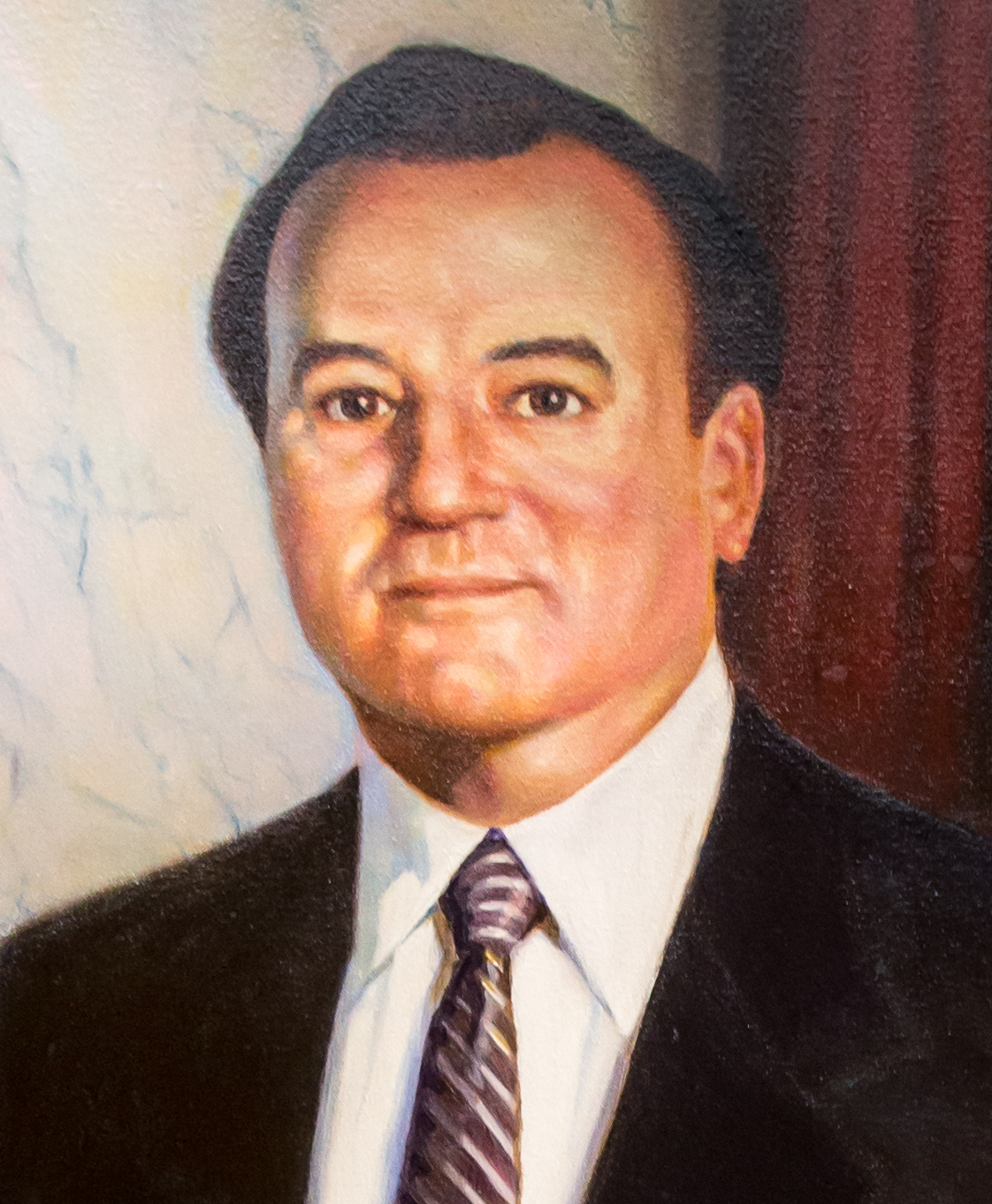

Nominee	Edward D. DiPrete	Anthony J. Solomon
Party	Republican	Democratic
Popular vote	245,059	163,311
Percentage	60.01%	39.99%
- DiPrete: 50–60% 60–70% 70–80% Solomon: 50–60% 60–70%
Governor before election
J. Joseph Garrahy
Democratic
Elected Governor
Edward D. DiPrete
Republican

The 1984 Rhode Island gubernatorial election was held on November 6, 1984. Republican nominee and Cranston mayor Edward D. DiPrete defeated Democratic nominee Anthony J. Solomon with 60% of the vote.

== Utah ==
1984 Utah gubernatorial election
- November 6, 1984
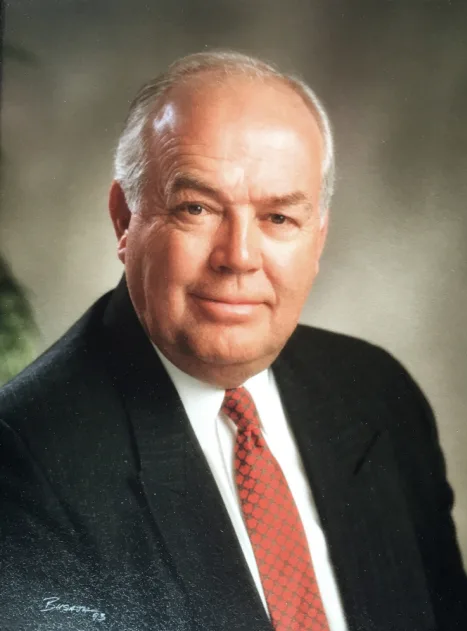

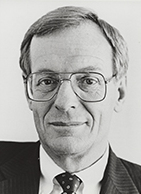
Nominee	Norman H. Bangerter	Wayne Owens
Party	Republican	Democratic
Popular vote	351,792	275,669
Percentage	55.87%	43.78%
- County results Bangerter: 50–60% 60–70% 70–80% Owens: 50–60% 60–70%
Governor before election
Scott M. Matheson
Democratic
Elected Governor
Norman H. Bangerter
Republican

The 1984 Utah gubernatorial election was held on November 6, 1984. Republican nominee Norman H. Bangerter defeated Democratic nominee Wayne Owens with 55.87% of the vote, becoming Utah's first Republican governor in 20 years.

== Vermont ==
1984 Vermont gubernatorial election
- November 6, 1984
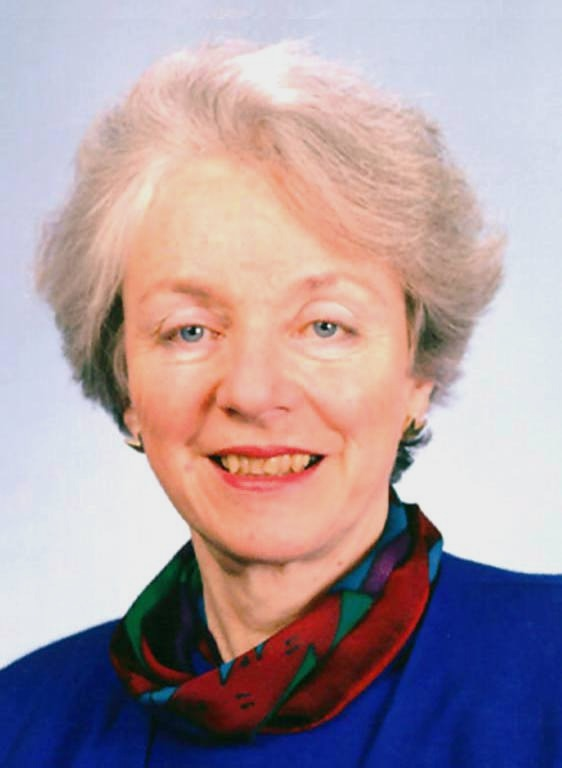

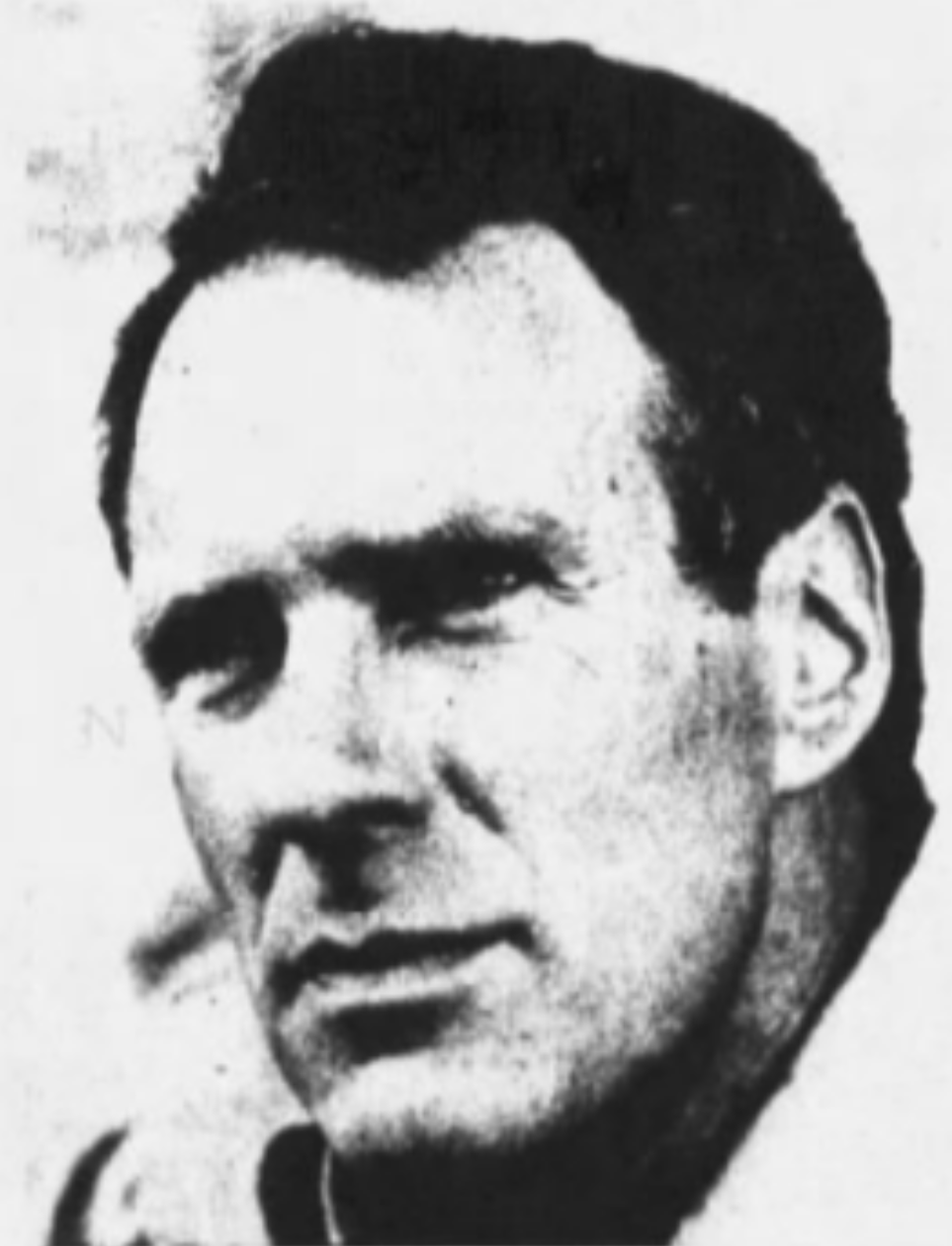
Nominee	Madeleine Kunin	John Easton Jr.
Party	Democratic	Republican
Popular vote	116,938	113,264
Percentage	50.0%	48.5%
- Kunin: 40-50% 50-60% 60-70% Easton: 40-50% 50-60% 60-70% 70-80% 80-90%
Governor before election
Richard Snelling
Republican
Elected Governor
Madeleine Kunin
Democratic

The 1984 Vermont gubernatorial election took place on November 6, 1984. Incumbent Republican Richard A. Snelling did not run for another term as Governor of Vermont. Democratic candidate Madeleine Kunin defeated Republican candidate John J. Easton Jr. to succeed him. Kunin's win coincided with the presidential election, which saw Republican Ronald Reagan win Vermont with nearly 58% of the vote.

== Washington ==
1984 Washington gubernatorial election
- November 6, 1984
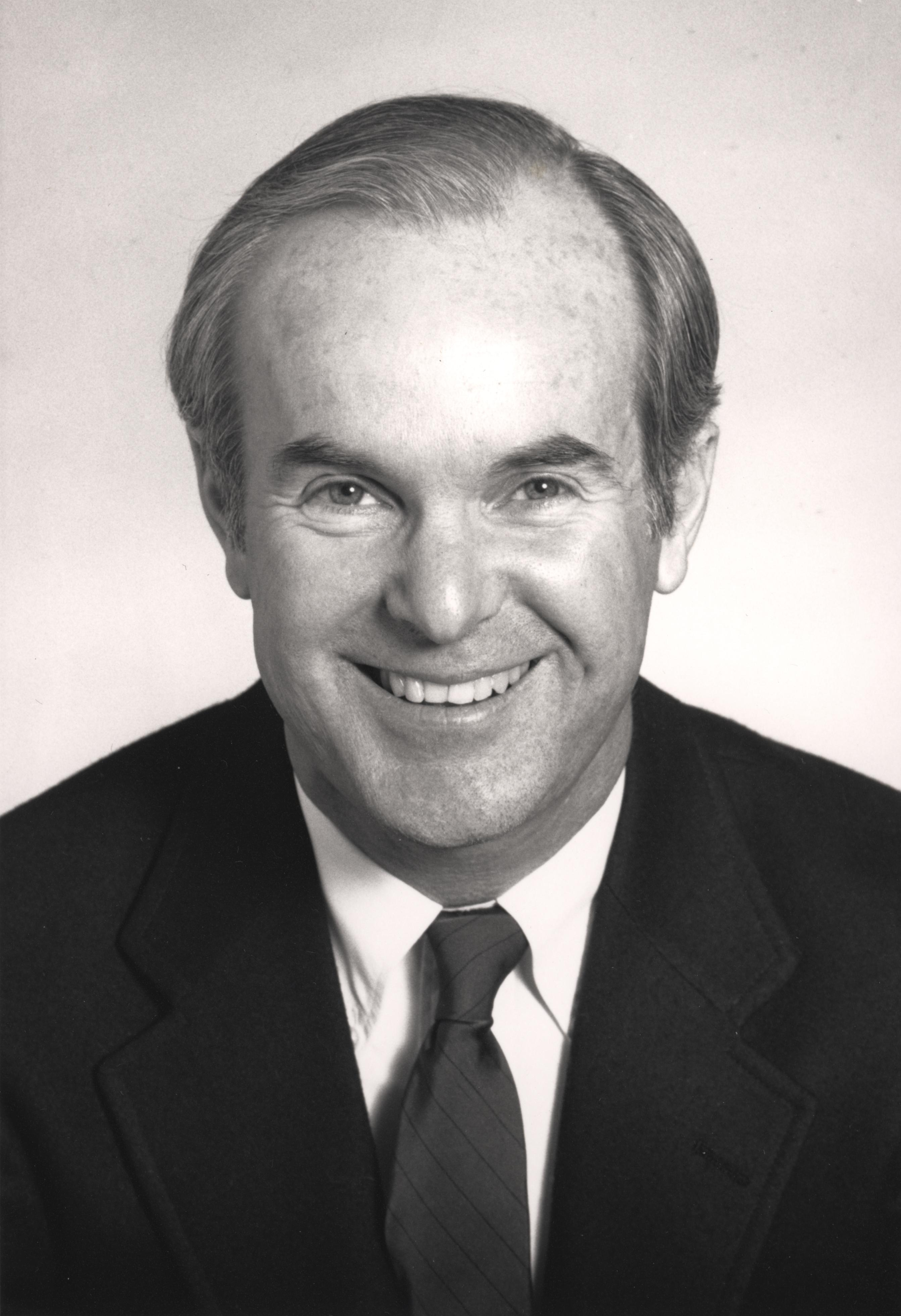

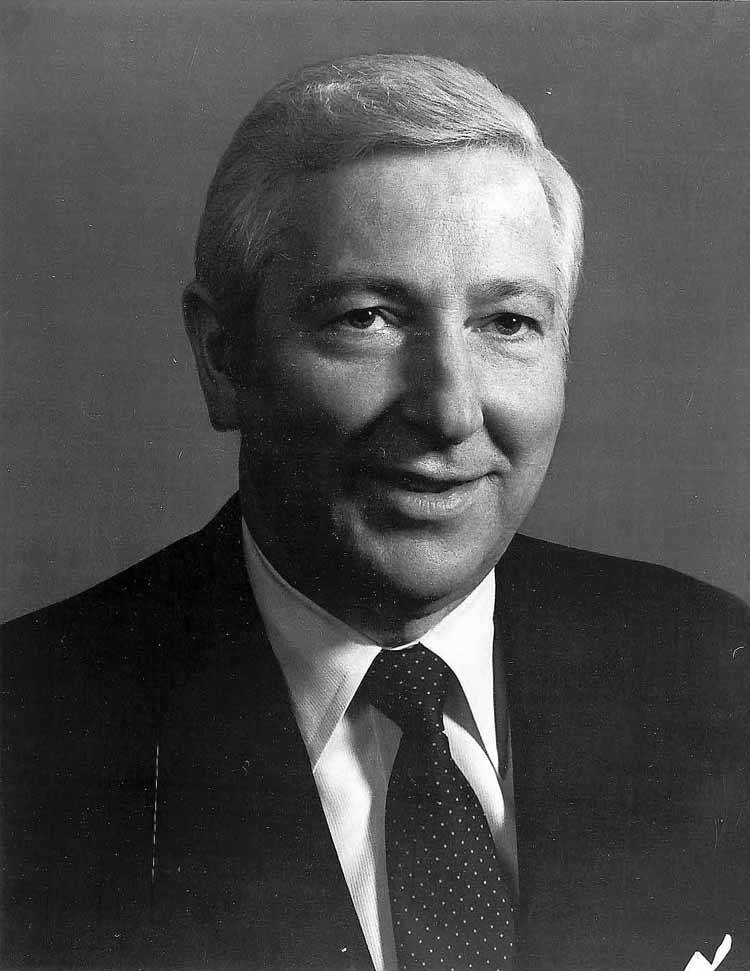
Nominee	Booth Gardner	John Spellman
Party	Democratic	Republican
Popular vote	1,006,993	881,994
Percentage	53.31%	46.69%
- County results Gardner: 50–60% 60–70% 70–80% Spellman: 50–60%
Governor before election
John Spellman
Republican
Elected Governor
Booth Gardner
Democratic

The 1984 Washington gubernatorial election was held on November 6, 1984. Incumbent Republican John Spellman ran for re-election to a second term but was defeated by Democrat Booth Gardner despite Republican President Ronald Reagan carrying the state by 13 points in the concurrent 1984 Election.

== West Virginia ==
1984 West Virginia gubernatorial election
- November 6, 1984
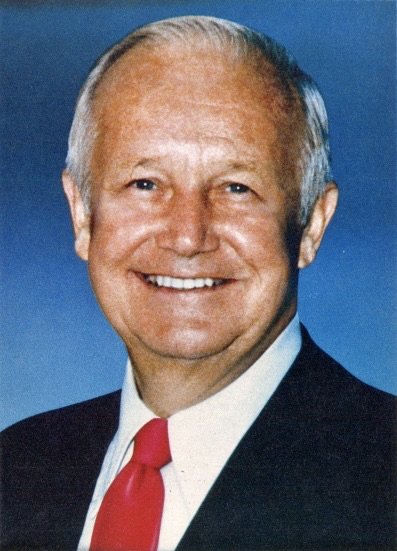

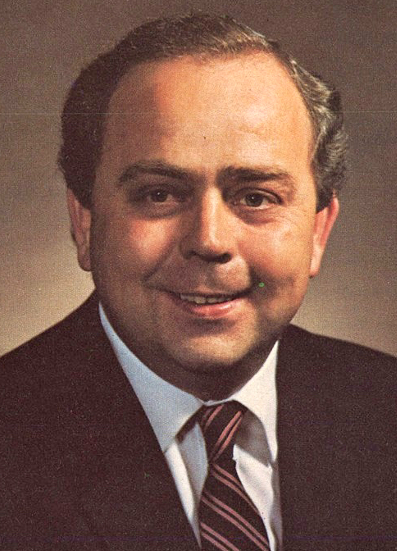
Nominee	Arch A. Moore Jr.	Clyde M. See Jr.
Party	Republican	Democratic
Popular vote	394,937	346,565
Percentage	53.26%	46.74%
- County results Moore: 50–60% 60–70% 70–80% See: 50–60% 60–70% 70–80%
Governor before election
Jay Rockefeller
Democratic
Elected Governor
Arch A. Moore, Jr.
Republican

The 1984 West Virginia gubernatorial election took place on November 6, 1984, to elect the governor of West Virginia. Until 2020, this was the last time West Virginia voted for the Republican candidate for Governor and for President, as both elections are held concurrently in the state.

== See also ==
- 1984 United States elections
  - 1984 United States presidential election
  - 1984 United States Senate elections
  - 1984 United States House of Representatives elections
