= 1984 North Dakota gubernatorial election =

- November 6, 1984
- Turnout: 314,382
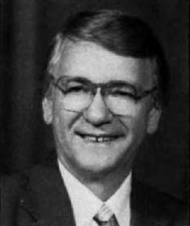

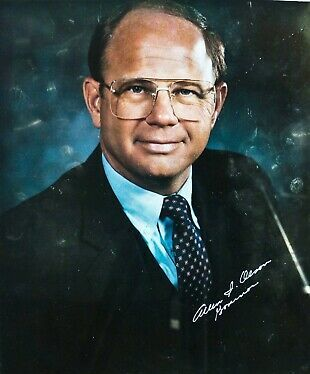
Nominee	George A. Sinner	Allen I. Olson
Party	Democratic–NPL	Republican
Running mate	Ruth Meiers	Ernest Sands
Popular vote	173,922	140,460
Percentage	55.32%	44.68%
- County results Sinner: 50–60% 60–70% Olsen: 50–60% 60–70%
Governor before election
Allen I. Olson
Republican
Elected Governor
George A. Sinner
Democratic–NPL

The 1984 North Dakota gubernatorial election took place on November 6, 1984 to elect the Governor and Lieutenant Governor of North Dakota. Voters selected Democratic candidate George A. Sinner and his running mate Ruth Meiers over Republican incumbent Governor Allen I. Olson and Lieutenant Governor Ernest Sands. As of 2026, this is the last North Dakota gubernatorial election where the incumbent was defeated.

== Results ==
North Dakota gubernatorial election, 1984
Party	Candidate	Votes	%	±%
Democratic–NPL	George A. Sinner; Ruth Meiers	173,922	55.32	▲8.93
Republican	Allen I. Olson (inc.); Ernest Sands (inc.)	140,460	44.68	▼8.93
Majority		33,462	10.64	▲3.42
Total votes		314,382	100.00	
Democratic–NPL gain from Republican				

== See also ==
United States gubernatorial elections, 1984
