= Helgi Johanneson =

Attorney General of North Dakota

24th Attorney General of North Dakota
- In office January 2, 1963 – January 2, 1973
- Governor: William L. Guy
- Preceded by: Leslie R. Burgum
- Succeeded by: Allen I. Olson

Personal details
- Born: June 21, 1906; Gardar, North Dakota
- Died: March 7, 1994 (aged 87); Bismarck, North Dakota
- Political party: Republican
- Children: 4
- Parent: Benidikt Jóhanneson Bóthildur Guðjónsdóttir

Helgi Johanneson (June 21, 1906 – March 7, 1994) was an Icelandic-American politician who served as the Attorney General of North Dakota from 1963 to 1973.

== Early life ==
Helgi was the youngest child of Icelandic Immigrants Benidikt and Bóthildur (Guðjónsdóttir) Johanneson, who immigrated to the United States in 1873 and 1890 respectively. Helgi's father died when he was only 10 years old.

== Personal life ==
In 1930, Helgi married Ann Prokosch. Her parents, Peter and Mary, had immigrated from Bohemia in the late 19th century. Helgi and Ann went on to have 4 children and were married for 64 years until Helgi's death in 1994.

== Education ==
Helgi attended the University of North Dakota and later the William Mitchell School of Law in St. Paul, Minnesota.

== Political career ==
Helgi served as the North Dakota Attorney General from 1963 to 1973. He had previously served as the State's Attorney in Pembina County. As Attorney General, Helgi was an advocate for state's rights, particularly as pertaining to Civil Rights Legislation, as evidenced by a 1963 opinion given by Helgi to the United States Senate Judiciary Subcommittee on the Constitution in which he stated the following:

“I have read S. 1117 and S. 1219 which you enclosed in your letter. While I have not been in particular contact with the record and accomplishments of the Commission on Civil Rights, I might submit that I do not particularly support either of the bills. Of necessity, I can only speak for myself; however, our experience in this field has been very limited. We do have civil rights statutes in force and there have been a few successful prosecutions. This leads me to the conclusion that we, in North Dakota, do not have the problems that some sister states might; consequently, I see no compelling need for a Federal authority in this area. Of course, merely setting up the Commission does not solve the problem and the ultimate decision lies with the Congress.”

Following Helgi's death, former Governor of North Dakota Arthur A. Link spoke about Helgi, saying that “he was a dedicated public servant. He gave of himself unselfishly to those things that had to do with issues that were good for the state of North Dakota and he will be missed very dearly”

Party political offices
Preceded by Leslie R. Burgum	Republican nominee for North Dakota Attorney General; 1962, 1964, 1968	Succeeded by Allen I. Olson
