= Senator Sands =

Senator Sands may refer to:

- Ernest Sands (1922–2012), North Dakota State Senate
- Joshua Sands (politician) (1757–1835), New York State Senate
