= John E. Yunker =

American public servant and politician

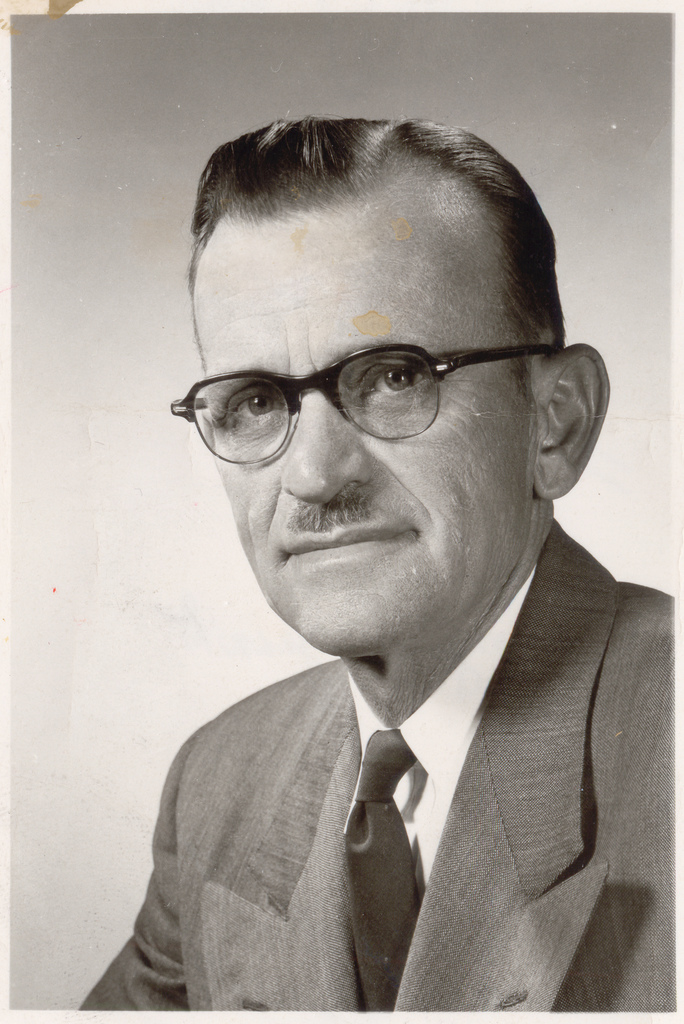

Member of the North Dakota Senate from the 10th district
- In office December 1, 1954 – December 1, 1962
- Preceded by: Kenneth K. Pyle
- Succeeded by: George A. Sinner

Personal details
- Born: John Edward Yunker; November 18, 1896; Washburn, Illinois, U.S.
- Died: April 15, 1968 (aged 71); Fargo, North Dakota, U.S.
- Political party: Democratic (D-NPL)
- Spouse: Irene Sullivan (m. 1932)
- Children: 5
- Education: North Dakota Agricultural College
- Occupation: Farmer; politician

John Edward Yunker (November 18, 1896 – April 15, 1968) was a North Dakota public servant and politician with the Democratic-NPL Party. He served two terms in the North Dakota Senate (1955–62) representing the district encompassing Casselton in central Cass County.
