= 1996 North Dakota gubernatorial election =

- November 5, 1996
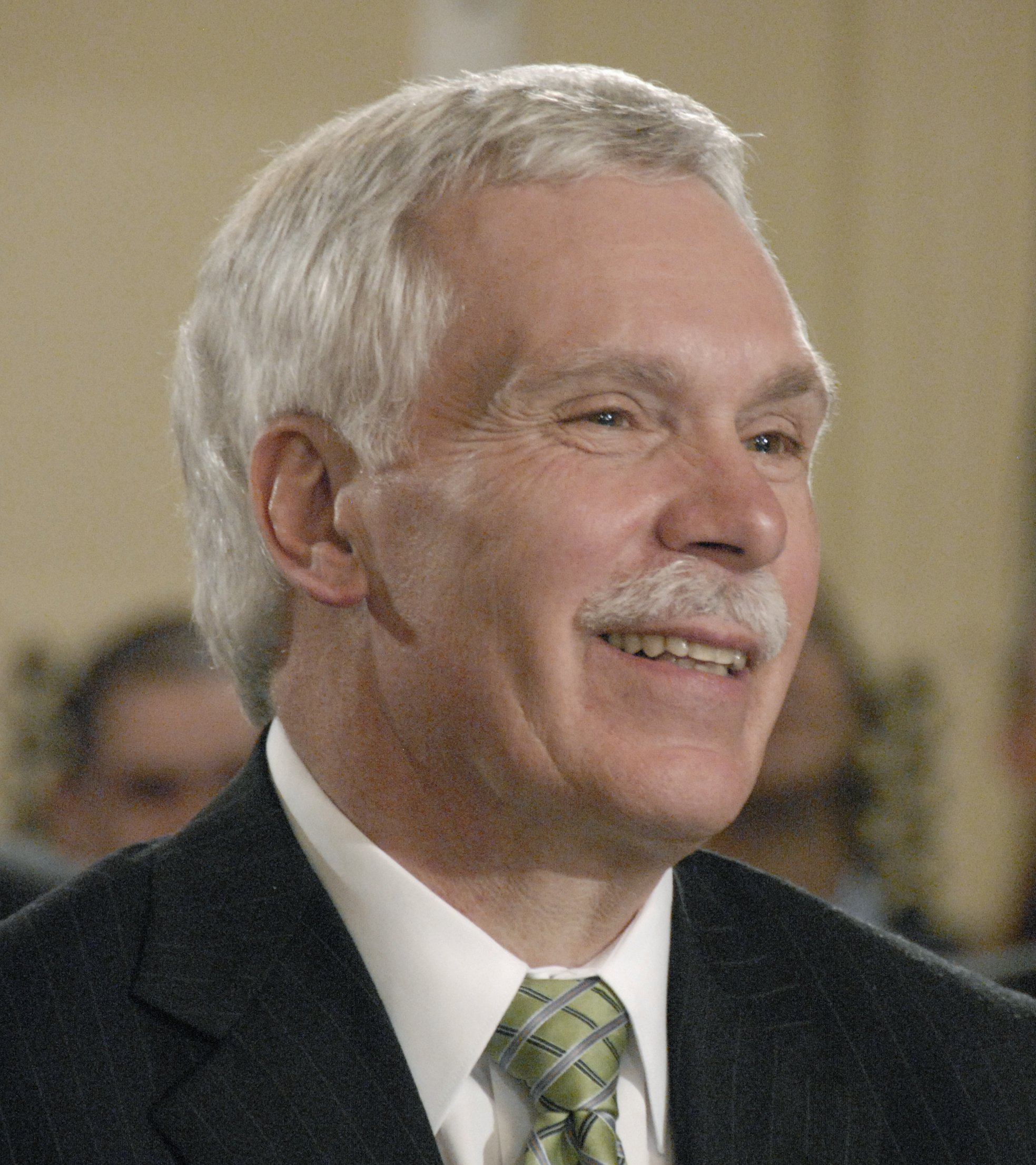

Nominee	Ed Schafer	Lee Kaldor
Party	Republican	Democratic–NPL
Running mate	Rosemarie Myrdal	Barbara Pyle
Popular vote	174,937	89,349
Percentage	66.19%	33.81%
- County results Schafer: 50–60% 60–70% 70–80% 80–90% Kaldor: 50–60%
Governor before election
Ed Schafer
Republican
Elected Governor
Ed Schafer
Republican

The 1996 North Dakota gubernatorial election took place on November 5, 1996. Incumbent Republican Ed Schafer won re-election to a second term as Governor of North Dakota, defeating Democratic-NPL nominee Lee Kaldor.

Schafer became the first Republican to win reelection as governor in the state since John E. Davis in 1958, and the first Republican to ever win more than four years in the office.

== Results ==
North Dakota gubernatorial election, 1996
Party	Candidate	Votes	%	±%
Republican	Ed Schafer (inc.); Rosemarie Myrdal (inc.)	174,937	66.19	▲8.33
Democratic–NPL	Lee Kaldor; Barbara Pyle	89,349	33.81	▼6.81
Majority		85,588	32.38	▲15.14
Total votes		264,286	100.00	
Republican hold				
