= 1992 North Dakota gubernatorial election =

- November 3, 1992
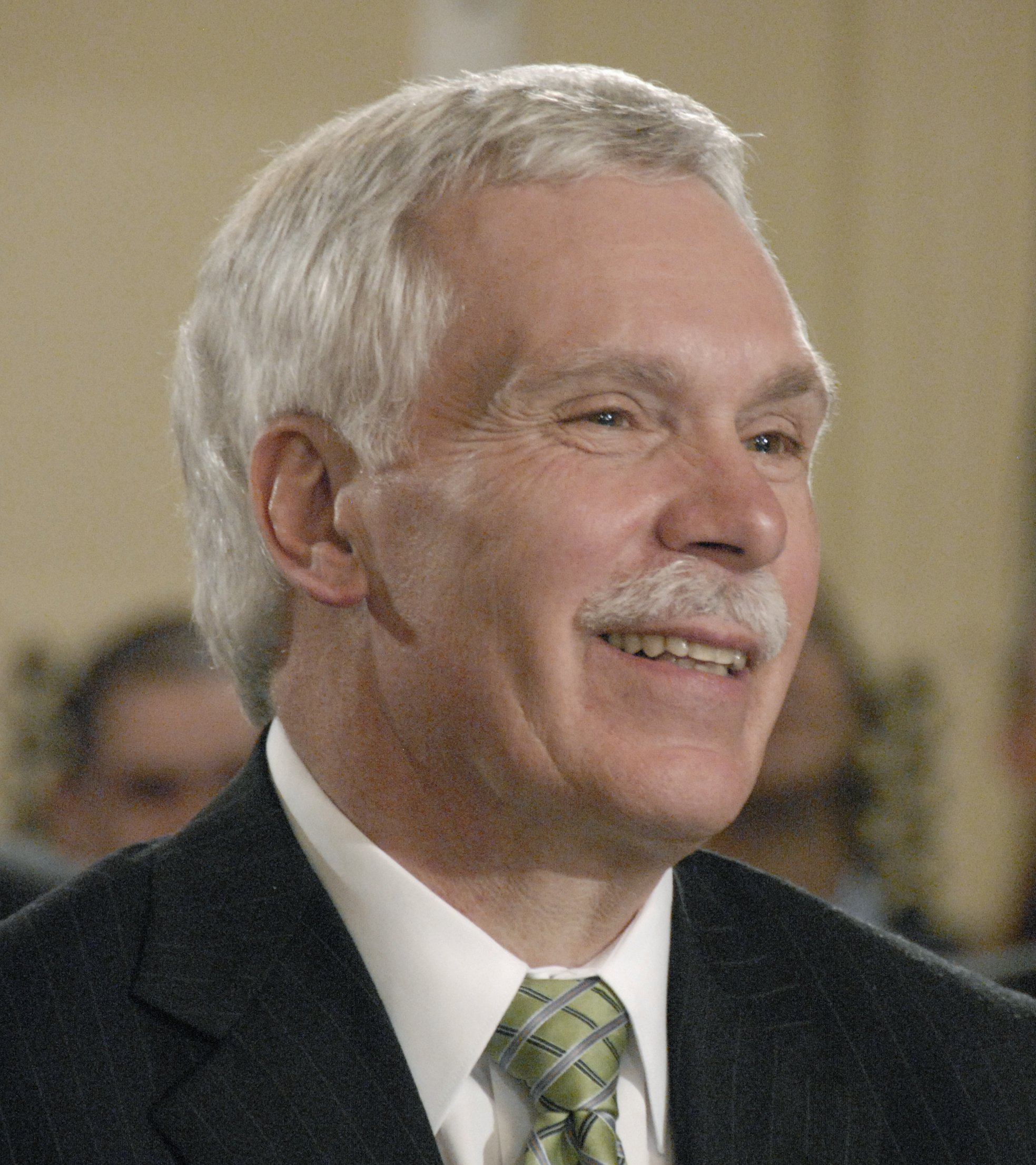

Nominee	Ed Schafer	Nicholas Spaeth
Party	Republican	Democratic–NPL
Running mate	Rosemarie Myrdal	Julie Hill
Popular vote	176,398	123,845
Percentage	57.86%	40.62%
- County results Schafer: 40–50% 50–60% 60–70% Spaeth: 40–50% 50–60% 60–70%
Governor before election
George A. Sinner
Democratic–NPL
Elected Governor
Ed Schafer
Republican

The 1992 North Dakota gubernatorial election took place on November 3, 1992. Incumbent Democratic-NPL Governor George A. Sinner retired. Republican nominee Ed Schafer defeated Democratic State Attorney General Nicholas Spaeth in a landslide.

This was the only gubernatorial seat which the Republicans gained during this election cycle.

== Results ==
North Dakota gubernatorial election, 1992
Party	Candidate	Votes	%	±%
Republican	Ed Schafer; Rosemarie Myrdal	176,398	57.86	▲17.74
Democratic–NPL	Nicholas Spaeth; Julie Hill	123,845	40.62	▼19.26
Independent	Harley McClain; Marj Sandry	2,614	0.86	N/A
Independent	Michael DuPaul; Jerry K. Scott	2,004	0.66	N/A
Majority		52,553	17.24	▼2.52
Total votes		304,861	100.00	
Republican gain from Democratic–NPL				
