= 1976 North Dakota gubernatorial election =

- November 2, 1976
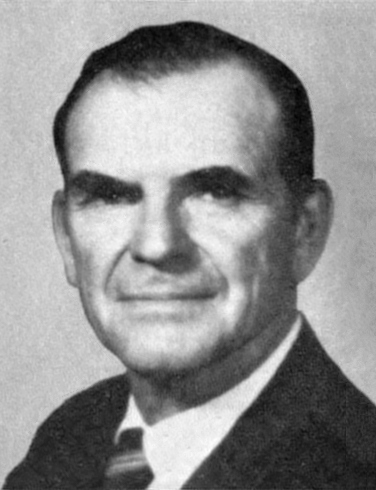

Nominee	Arthur A. Link	Richard Elkin
Party	Democratic–NPL	Republican
Running mate	Wayne Sanstead	Ernest G. Pyle
Popular vote	153,309	138,321
Percentage	51.58%	46.53%
- County results Link: 40–50% 50–60% 60–70% Elkin: 40–50% 50–60% 60–70%
Governor before election
Arthur A. Link
Democratic–NPL
Elected Governor
Arthur A. Link
Democratic–NPL

The 1976 North Dakota gubernatorial election was held on November 2, 1976. Incumbent Democratic governor Arthur A. Link Ran for a second term against Republican Richard Elkin. Link won reelection defeating Elkin 52% to 47%. This election marked the first time that the lieutenant governor of North Dakota was elected jointly on the same ticket with the governor following a 1974 constitutional amendment.

== Primary elections ==
Primary elections were held on September 7, 1976.

=== Democratic primary ===
==== Candidates ====
- Arthur A. Link, incumbent governor

==== Results ====
Democratic primary results
Party	Candidate	Votes	%
Democratic–NPL	Arthur A. Link (inc.)	54,759	100.00
Total votes		54,759	100.00

=== Republican primary ===
==== Candidates ====
- Richard Elkin, North Dakota Public Service Commissioner
- Herb Geving

==== Results ====
Republican primary results
Party	Candidate	Votes	%
Republican	Richard Elkin	54,427	81.92
Republican	Herb Geving	12,013	18.08
Total votes		66,440	100.00

== General election ==
=== Candidates ===
Major party candidates

- Arthur A. Link, Democratic
- Richard Elkin, Republican

Other candidates

- Martin K. Vaaler, American

Link Ran on his record of Coal mining, stating that he understood that the coal had to be mined carefully and that he knew the state had to have a fair return for its resources, while also stating that he was guiding resources to better manage North Dakota's future. His campaign slogan was. “Art Link: Good judgment we can trust”.

He also stated that his policy was cautious orderly development on energy and one that was for the basic needs of the state of North Dakota as well as concern for the nation's energy.

=== Results ===
1976 North Dakota gubernatorial election
Party	Candidate	Votes	%	±%
Democratic–NPL	Arthur A. Link (inc.); Wayne Sanstead (inc.)	153,309	51.58	▲0.54
Republican	Richard Elkin; Ernest G. Pyle	138,321	46.53	▼2.43
American	Martin K. Vaaler; Truman C. Wold	5,619	1.89	N/A
Majority		14,988	5.04	▲2.96
Total votes		297,249	100.00	
Democratic–NPL hold				
