= Robert Wefald =

American judge (born 1942)

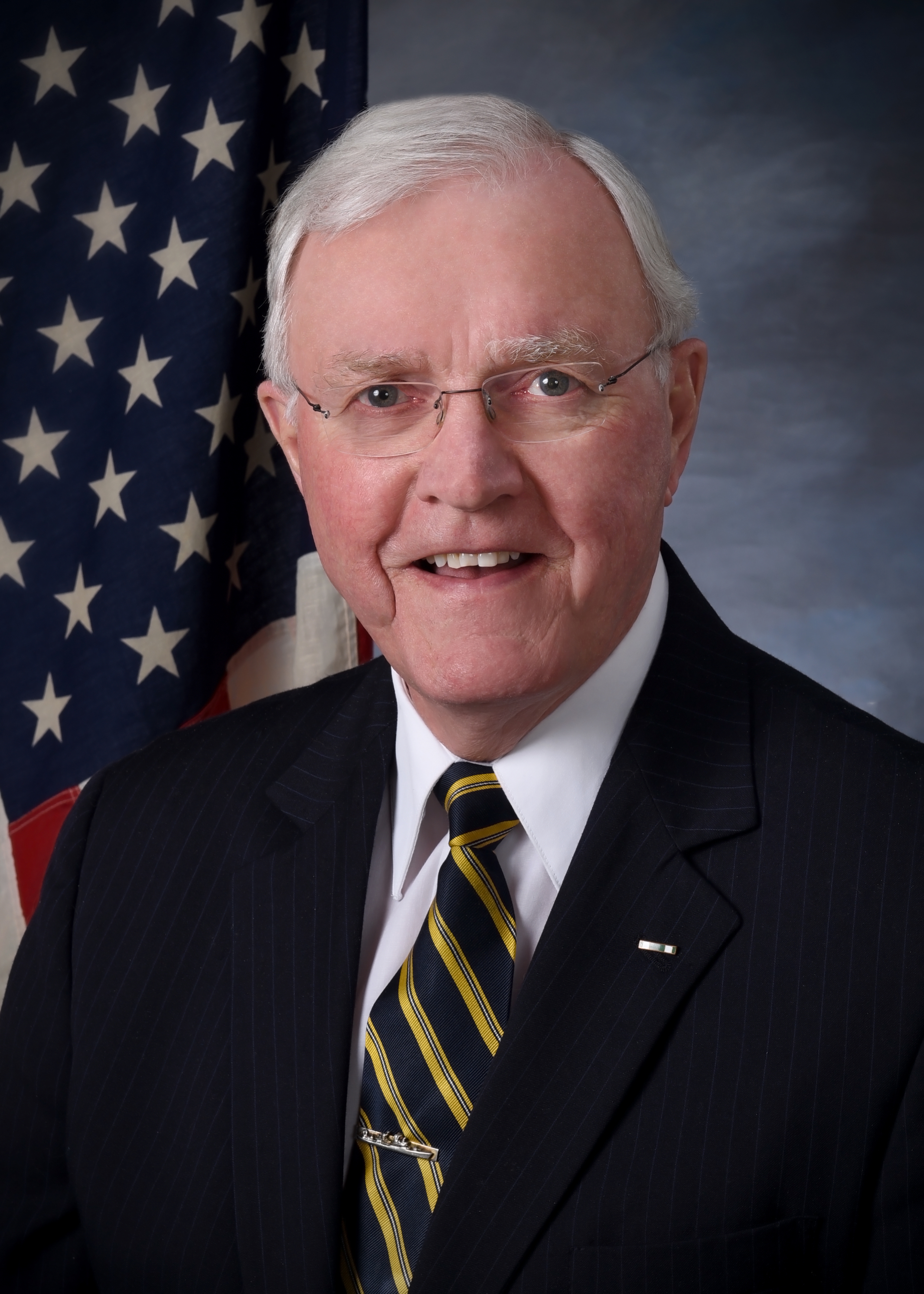

Attorney General of North Dakota
- In office 1981–1984
- Preceded by: Allen I. Olson
- Succeeded by: Nicholas Spaeth

Robert O. Wefald (born July 18, 1942) was an American District Court Judge in the South Central Judicial District in North Dakota. He was elected in 1998 and 2004. He retired in 2010. He is the husband of former North Dakota Public Service Commissioner Susan Wefald.

Wefald was born in Excelsior, Minnesota. He graduated from Minot High School in Minot.

Wefald earned his B.A. from the University of North Dakota in Grand Forks and his J.D. from the University of Michigan Law School.

Wefald served as the 26th North Dakota Attorney General from 1981 through 1984.

== 2020 Presidential Election ==
Wefald was one of three people nominated by the Republican Party to vote in the Electoral College in the 2020 Presidential Election on North Dakota's behalf.

Party political offices
Preceded by Allen I. Olson	Republican nominee for North Dakota Attorney General; 1980, 1984	Succeeded by John Gosbee
Legal offices
Preceded by Allen I. Olson	Attorney General of North Dakota; 1981–1984	Succeeded by Nicholas Spaeth
