= 1988 North Dakota gubernatorial election =

- November 8, 1988
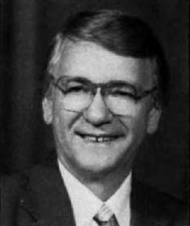

Nominee	George A. Sinner	Leon Mallberg
Party	Democratic–NPL	Republican
Running mate	Lloyd Omdahl	Donna Nalewaja
Popular vote	179,094	119,986
Percentage	59.88%	40.12%
- County results Sinner: 50–60% 60–70% 70–80% Mallberg: 50–60%
Governor before election
George A. Sinner
Democratic–NPL
Elected Governor
George A. Sinner
Democratic–NPL

The 1988 North Dakota gubernatorial election took place on November 8, 1988 to elect the governor of North Dakota. Incumbent Democratic governor George A. Sinner was reelected to a second term with more 59% of votes, defeating Republican nominee Leon Mallberg, a businessman and "anti-tax crusader" and his running mate Donna Nalewaja. Lloyd Omdahl, who had been appointed Lieutenant Governor of North Dakota in 1987 after the death of Ruth Meiers, was elected on the ticket. As of 2026, this is the last time a Democrat was elected Governor of North Dakota.

== Results ==
North Dakota gubernatorial election, 1988
Party	Candidate	Votes	%	±%
Democratic–NPL	George A. Sinner (inc.); Lloyd Omdahl	179,094	59.88	▲4.56
Republican	Leon Mallberg; Donna Nalewaja	119,986	40.12	▼4.56
Majority		59,108	19.76	▲9.12
Total votes		299,080	100.00	
Democratic–NPL hold				

== See also ==
United States gubernatorial elections, 1988
