= 1980 North Dakota gubernatorial election =

- November 4, 1980
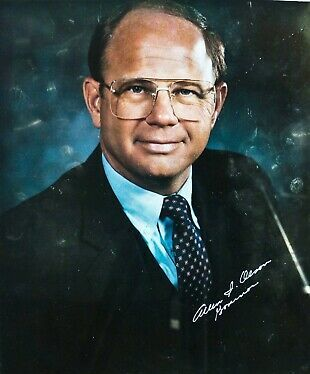

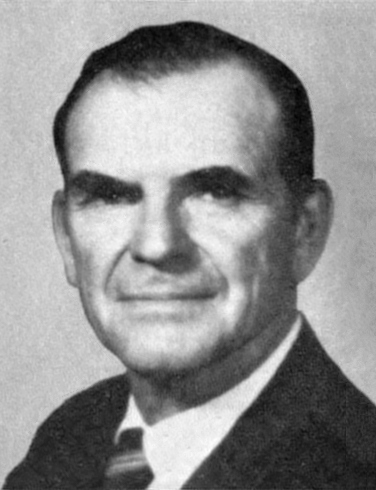
Nominee	Allen I. Olson	Arthur A. Link
Party	Republican	Democratic–NPL
Running mate	Ernest Sands	Wayne Sanstead
Popular vote	162,230	140,391
Percentage	53.61%	46.39%
- County results Olson: 50–60% 60–70% Link: 50–60% 60–70%
Governor before election
Arthur A. Link
Democratic–NPL
Elected Governor
Allen I. Olson
Republican

The 1980 North Dakota gubernatorial election was held on November 4, 1980. The election pitted Republican State Attorney General Allen I. Olson against incumbent Democratic-NPL Governor Arthur A. Link. Olson defeated Link 54% to 46%. As of 2026, this is the North Dakota gubernatorial race where the winner received less than 55% of the votes.

== Primary elections ==
Primary elections were held on September 2, 1980.

=== Democratic primary ===
==== Candidates ====
- Arthur A. Link, incumbent governor

==== Results ====
Democratic primary results
Party	Candidate	Votes	%
Democratic–NPL	Arthur A. Link (inc.)	41,751	100.00
Total votes		41,751	100.00

=== Republican primary ===
==== Candidates ====
- Orville W. Hagen, former lieutenant governor
- Allen I. Olson, North Dakota attorney general

==== Results ====
Republican Party primary results
Party	Candidate	Votes	%
Republican	Allen I. Olson	60,016	75.66
Republican	Orville W. Hagen	19,306	24.34
Total votes		79,322	100.00

== General election ==
=== Candidates ===
- Arthur A. Link, Democratic
- Allen I. Olson, Republican

=== Results ===
1980 North Dakota gubernatorial election
Party	Candidate	Votes	%	±%
Republican	Allen I. Olson; Ernest Sands	162,230	53.61	▲7.08
Democratic–NPL	Arthur A. Link (inc.); Wayne Sanstead (inc.)	140,391	46.39	▼5.19
Majority		21,839	7.22	▲2.18
Total votes		302,621	100.00	
Republican gain from Democratic–NPL				
