= 1962 North Dakota gubernatorial election =

- November 6, 1962
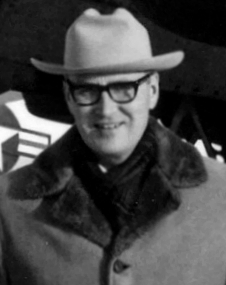

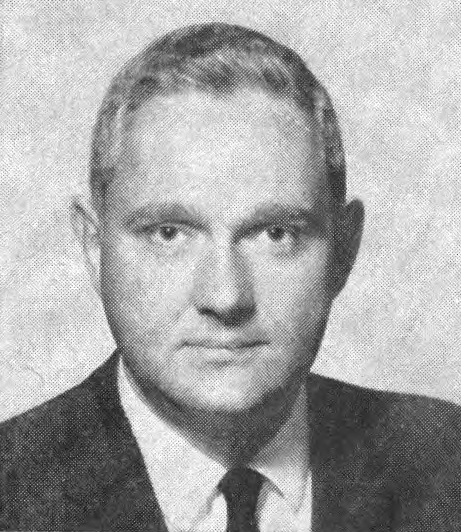
Nominee	William L. Guy	Mark Andrews
Party	Democratic–NPL	Republican
Popular vote	115,258	113,251
Percentage	50.44%	49.56%
- County results Guy: 50–60% 60–70% Andrews: 50–60% 60–70%
Governor before election
William L. Guy
Democratic–NPL
Elected Governor
William L. Guy
Democratic–NPL

The 1962 North Dakota gubernatorial election was held on November 6, 1962. Democrat William L. Guy defeated Republican nominee Mark Andrews with 50.44% of the vote.

This election marked the last time that the Governor of North Dakota was elected to a two-year term. After a constitutional amendment was adopted in 1964, North Dakota governors and other statewide officials would be elected for terms of four years.

== Primary elections ==
Primary elections were held on June 26, 1962.

=== Democratic primary ===
==== Candidates ====
- William L. Guy, incumbent Governor

==== Results ====
Democratic primary results
Party	Candidate	Votes	%
Democratic–NPL	William L. Guy (inc.)	48,020	100.00
Total votes		48,020	100.00

=== Republican primary ===
==== Candidates ====
- Mark Andrews, Republican national committeeman

==== Results ====
Republican primary results
Party	Candidate	Votes	%
Republican	Mark Andrews	68,870	100.00
Total votes		68,870	100.00

== General election ==
=== Candidates ===
- William L. Guy, Democratic
- Mark Andrews, Republican

=== Results ===
1962 North Dakota gubernatorial election
Party	Candidate	Votes	%	±%
Democratic–NPL	William L. Guy (inc.)	115,258	50.44	▲1.00
Republican	Mark Andrews	113,251	49.56	▲5.08
Majority		2,007	0.88	▼4.10
Total votes		228,509	100.00	
Democratic–NPL hold				
