= Arthur A. Link =

American politician (1914–2010)

Art Link
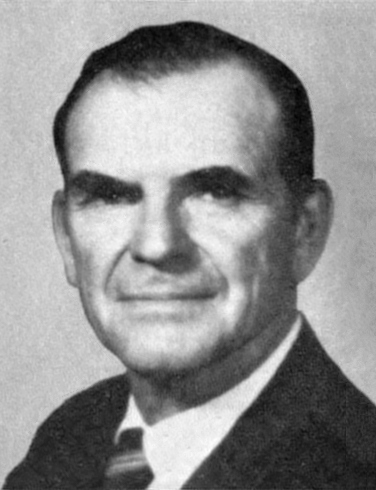

27th Governor of North Dakota
- In office January 2, 1973 – January 6, 1981
- Lieutenant: Wayne Sanstead
- Preceded by: William L. Guy
- Succeeded by: Allen I. Olson

Member of the U.S. House of Representatives from North Dakota's 2nd district
- In office January 3, 1971 – January 2, 1973
- Preceded by: Thomas S. Kleppe
- Succeeded by: District eliminated

Speaker of the North Dakota House of Representatives
- In office 1965–1967
- Preceded by: Stanley Saugstad
- Succeeded by: Gordon S. Aamoth

Personal details
- Born: Arthur Albert Link; May 24, 1914 Alexander, North Dakota, U.S.
- Died: June 1, 2010 (aged 96) Bismarck, North Dakota, U.S.
- Party: Democratic
- Spouse: Grace Johnson (m. 1939)
- Children: 6
- Profession: Politician; Farmer
- Website: artlinklegacy.com

Arthur Albert Link (May 24, 1914 – June 1, 2010) was an American politician of the North Dakota Democratic Party, and later the Democratic-NPL. He served as a U.S. representative from 1971 to 1973, and as the 27th governor of North Dakota from 1973 to 1981. Link was a charter member of the National Cowboy Hall of Fame.

== Early life ==
Link was born in Alexander, North Dakota. He attended the McKenzie County schools, and North Dakota Agricultural College. He worked as a farmer soon after his 1939 marriage, and became active in politics as a member of the local chapters of the National Farmers' Union and Nonpartisan League.

Link began his public career service at the local level as a member of county and state Farm Security Administration committees during the 1930s. He served on the Randolph Township Board of Supervisors from 1942 to 1971, the McKenzie County Welfare Board from 1948 to 1968, and was a member of the local school board from 1945 to 1963.

== Political career ==
Link was elected to the North Dakota House of Representatives in 1946 as a Democrat. He served for 14 years as the house's minority leader, and was speaker of the house from 1965 to 1967. He was also a member of the Randolph Township Board from 1942 to 1972, the McKenzie County Welfare Board from 1948 to 1969, the Randolph School Board from 1945 to 1963, and the county and state Farm Security Administration committee from 1941 to 1946. He was a delegate to the North Dakota State conventions from 1964 to 1968.

== United States Representative 1971–1973 ==
=== Elections ===
In 1970, Link was persuaded to run for U.S. Congress from the western district of North Dakota to succeed Republican incumbent Thomas S. Kleppe, who ran unsuccessfully for the U.S. Senate. It was a job with little long-term security, as it appeared certain the state would be reduced to a single congressional district after the census. Link was narrowly elected as a Dem-NPLer to the 92nd United States Congress in a mild surprise. He opted not to challenge the state's veteran incumbent (Republican Mark Andrews) for re-election in the new at-large district in 1972, and instead ran for governor.

=== Committee assignments ===
Link served on the House Agriculture Committee and the Livestock and Grains and Domestic Marketing and Consumer Relations Subcommittees. as well as the District of Columbia Committee and the subcommittees of Judiciary and Business, Commerce and Fiscal Affairs.

== Governorship 1973–1981 ==
Link ran for governor in 1972, defeating Edward P. Burns for the Democratic nomination. In the general election he faced Republican Lieutenant Governor Richard F. Larsen. Link won the election by 5,867 votes.

As governor, Link insisted that the state's energy resources be developed in harmony with values deeper than mere extraction: stewardship, the agrarian ideal, and the integrity of rural communities.

Link was in favor of careful management of the state's natural resources especially during an energy crisis that caused controversy between those who wished to exploit the state's coal as well as oil and those who wished to protect the state's environment. North Dakota's agricultural community prospered during Link's two terms as governor. Income and property tax laws were reformed by the legislature, but he vetoed a reapportionment bill. Link supported foreign and domestic trade. Exploration of North Dakota's great mineral wealth was a big issue during his tenure as governor. He advocated conservative policies for coal and oil development.

Link ran for a second term in 1976, He was unopposed in the Democratic primary and faced Republican nominee Richard Elkin in the general election. touting his accomplishments on coal mining, Link won re-election defeating Elkin by 14,988 votes.

Link helped in the establishment of the former governor's mansion into a museum and the construction of the state's heritage center. He led a trade mission to Middle East in the 1970s, and accompanied trade and cultural missions to other countries.

In 1980. Link ran for a third term. He won the Democratic nomination unopposed and in the general election faced Republican nominee and State Attorney General Allen Olson. Link lost to Olson by 21,839 votes.

== Later life ==
After his defeat, Link remained active in public life, leading a successful fight against a state lottery in 1984. He also remained involved in historical preservation and writing of local histories. He and his wife Grace lived in Bismarck, North Dakota. He was a strong supporter of the North Dakota Heritage Center, and in 1985 he was appointed the chairman of the Centennial Commission by Governor George Sinner.

A movie of his life was made in 2008, When the Landscape is Quiet Again.

== Death ==
Link died at St. Alexius Hospital in Bismarck, on June 1, 2010. He was buried at Alexander Cemetery in Alexander.

Party political offices
Preceded by William L. Guy	Democratic nominee for Governor of North Dakota; 1972, 1976, 1980	Succeeded by George A. Sinner
U.S. House of Representatives
Preceded by Thomas S. Kleppe	Member of the U.S. House of Representatives from North Dakota's 2nd congressional district 1971–1973	Succeeded by none (district eliminated)
Political offices
Preceded by William L. Guy	Governor of North Dakota; 1973–1981	Succeeded by Allen I. Olson
