= 1964 North Dakota gubernatorial election =

- November 3, 1964
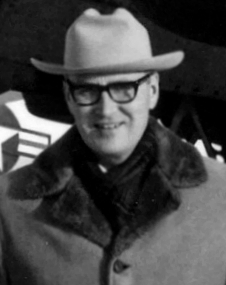

Nominee	William L. Guy	Donald Halcrow
Party	Democratic–NPL	Republican
Popular vote	146,414	116,247
Percentage	55.74%	44.26%
- County results Guy: 50–60% 60–70% Halcrow: 50–60% 60–70%
Governor before election
William L. Guy
Democratic–NPL
Elected Governor
William L. Guy
Democratic–NPL

The 1964 North Dakota gubernatorial election was held on November 3, 1964. Incumbent Democrat William L. Guy defeated Republican nominee Donald M. Halcrow with 55.74% of the vote. This election marked the first time the governor was elected to a four-year term, following the adoption of a consititutional amendment.

== Primary elections ==
Primary elections were held on June 30, 1964.

=== Republican primary ===
==== Candidates ====
- Donald M. Halcrow, state representative
- Robert P. McCarney

==== Results ====
Republican primary results
Party	Candidate	Votes	%
Republican	Donald M. Halcrow	43,089	54.99
Republican	Robert P. McCarney	35,269	45.01
Total votes		78,358	100.00

== General election ==
=== Candidates ===
- William L. Guy, Democratic
- Donald M. Halcrow, Republican

=== Results ===
1964 North Dakota gubernatorial election
Party	Candidate	Votes	%	±%
Democratic–NPL	William L. Guy (inc.)	146,414	55.74	▲5.30
Republican	Donald M. Halcrow	116,247	44.26	▼5.30
Majority		30,167	11.49	▲10.61
Total votes		262,661	100.00	
Democratic–NPL hold				
