= Allen I. Olson =

American lawyer and politician (1938–2025)

Al Olson
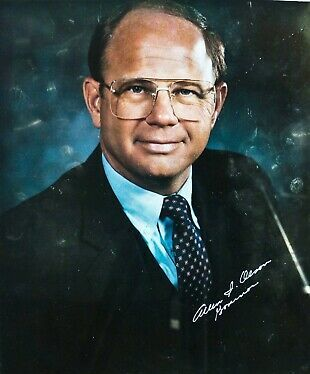
- Olson in 1981

28th Governor of North Dakota
- In office January 6, 1981 – January 1, 1985
- Lieutenant: Ernest Sands
- Preceded by: Art Link
- Succeeded by: George Sinner

25th Attorney General of North Dakota
- In office January 2, 1973 – January 6, 1981
- Governor: Art Link
- Preceded by: Helgi Johanneson
- Succeeded by: Robert Wefald

Personal details
- Born: Allen Ingvar Olson; November 5, 1938 Rolla, North Dakota, U.S.
- Died: December 26, 2025 (aged 87)
- Party: Republican
- Spouse: Barbara Benner
- Children: 3

Military service
- Branch: United States Army
- Service years: 1963–1967
- Unit: Army Judge Advocate General's Corps

Allen Ingvar "Al" Olson (November 5, 1938 – December 26, 2025) was an American Republican politician and attorney who served from 1981 to 1985 as the 28th governor of North Dakota. He defeated incumbent Arthur A. Link in the 1980 election and served one term.

== Education, military service and legal career ==
Olson was born on November 5, 1938, in Rolla, North Dakota. He received a law degree from the University of North Dakota, where he joined Lambda Chi Alpha fraternity and served in the United States Army as a judge advocate general's corps lawyer. In 1967 he served as Chief of Military Justice in Munich. From 1967 to 1969 he served as the assistant director of the Legislative Research Committee, which directed the state's first study of surface mining, soil banks, and land reclamation. He entered private practice as an attorney in 1969 with the law firm of Conmy, Rosenberg, Lucas, and Olson. He ran for attorney general of North Dakota in 1972 and served two terms in that position.

== Governor of North Dakota ==
In 1980, Olson sought the governor's office and defeated the incumbent, Arthur A. Link. His achievements during his term include creating the Department of Human Services and converting the Cross-Ranch into a state park. He also worked with the Task Force on drunk driving and supported the Garrison Diversion program. A controversial lawsuit against the state by the Association of Retarded Citizens was also filed during his years as governor. He ran for reelection in 1984 and lost to Democratic nominee George A. Sinner, 55% to 45%.

== Later professional career ==
After leaving office, Olson returned to private law practice in Bismarck for a year before leaving for Minneapolis to join the law firm of Fredrikson and Byron. In 1987, he left the firm to become co-owner of a die casting company based in New Hope, Minnesota. He also ran a community bank association for many years. He served as a commissioner of the International Joint Commission of Canada and the United States, having been appointed to the position by President George W. Bush in 2002.

On October 4, 2010, Olson announced that he supported Independence-Alliance Party candidate Tom Horner in the 2010 Minnesota gubernatorial election.

== Personal life ==
Olson was married to Barbara Benner Olson. They had three children.

He died on December 26, 2025, at the age of 87.

Party political offices
Preceded by Helgi Johanneson	Republican nominee for Attorney General of North Dakota; 1972, 1976	Succeeded by Robert Wefald
Preceded by Richard Elkin	Republican nominee for Governor of North Dakota; 1980, 1984	Succeeded by Leon Mallberg
Legal offices
Preceded by Helgi Johanneson	Attorney General of North Dakota; 1973–1981	Succeeded by Robert Wefald
Political offices
Preceded by Arthur A. Link	Governor of North Dakota; 1981–1985	Succeeded by George Sinner
