= 1956 North Dakota gubernatorial election =

- November 6, 1956
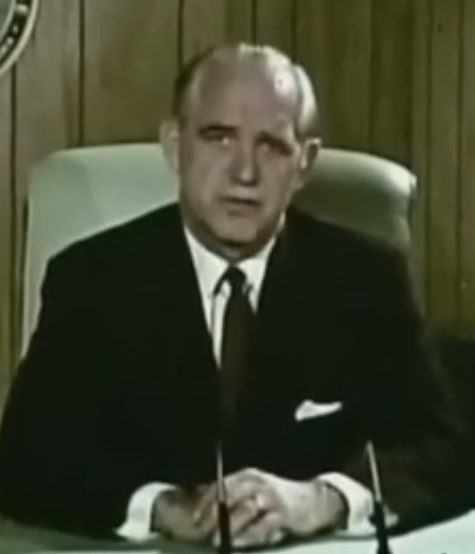

Nominee	John E. Davis	Wallace E. Warner
Party	Republican	Democratic–NPL
Popular vote	147,566	104,869
Percentage	58.46%	41.54%
- County results Davis: 50–60% 60–70% 70–80% Warner: 50–60%
Governor before election
Norman Brunsdale
Republican
Elected Governor
John E. Davis
Republican

The 1956 North Dakota gubernatorial election was held on November 6, 1956. Republican nominee John E. Davis defeated Democratic nominee Wallace E. Warner with 58.46% of the vote.

== Primary elections ==
Primary elections were held on June 26, 1956.

The Nonpartisan League, which had existed in the state since 1915, had been a influential coalition within the state. Though it primarily ran candidates under the Republican Party banner, there were growing divides between conservative and liberal factions of the league. After the rival factions endorsed competing presidential campaigns in 1952, the division became permanent. During the March 1956 League convention, the party voted 173 to 3 to file its candidates with the Democratic party. In May 1956, the Democratic Convention accepted the Nonpartisan League's candidates and adopted its platform, fully unifying the two parties into one and creating the North Dakota Democratic-Nonpartisan League Party. While the party organization merged with the Democrats, the conservative factions of the League joined the Republican party, shifting the state into the modern two-party system.

=== Democratic primary ===
==== Candidates ====
- Wallace E. Warner, former North Dakota Attorney General

==== Results ====
Democratic primary results
Party	Candidate	Votes	%
Democratic–NPL	Wallace E. Warner	56,906	100.00
Total votes		56,906	100.00

=== Republican primary ===
==== Candidates ====
- John E. Davis, State Senator
- Ray Schnell, former Lieutenant Governor

==== Results ====
Republican primary results
Party	Candidate	Votes	%
Republican	John E. Davis	55,149	53.31
Republican	Ray Schnell	48,296	46.69
Total votes		103,445	100.00

== General election ==
=== Candidates ===
- John E. Davis, Republican
- Wallace E. Warner, Democratic

=== Results ===
1956 North Dakota gubernatorial election
Party	Candidate	Votes	%	±%
Republican	John E. Davis	147,566	58.46	▼5.75
Democratic–NPL	Wallace E. Warner	104,869	41.54	▲5.75
Majority		42,697	16.91	▼11.52
Total votes		252,435	100.00	
Republican hold				
