= 1972 North Dakota gubernatorial election =

- November 7, 1972
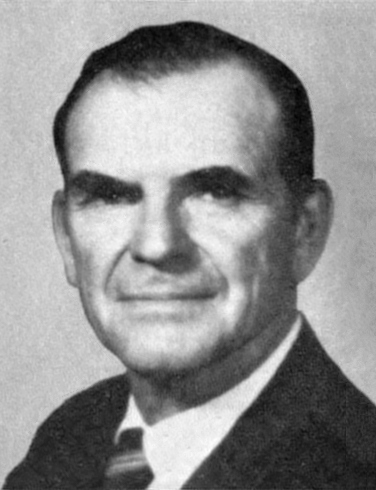

Nominee	Arthur A. Link	Richard F. Larsen
Party	Democratic–NPL	Republican
Popular vote	143,899	138,032
Percentage	51.04%	48.96%
- County results Link: 50–60% 60–70% Larsen: 50–60% 60–70%
Governor before election
William L. Guy
Democratic–NPL
Elected Governor
Arthur A. Link
Democratic–NPL

The 1972 North Dakota gubernatorial election was held on November 7, 1972. The election pitted Democratic Congressman Arthur A. Link against Republican Lieutenant Governor Richard F. Larsen. Link narrowly defeated Larsen by a margin of 51% to 49%. In 1974, a constitutional amendment would be adopted creating a joint ticket for the offices of governor and lieutenant governor, making this election the last time that they were elected separately.

== Primary elections ==
Primary elections were held on September 5, 1972.

=== Democratic primary ===
==== Candidates ====
- Edward P. Burns
- Arthur A. Link, U.S. representative

==== Results ====
Democratic primary results
Party	Candidate	Votes	%
Democratic–NPL	Arthur A. Link	29,979	93.07
Democratic–NPL	Edward P. Burns	2,231	6.93
Total votes		32,210	100.00

=== Republican primary ===
==== Candidates ====
- Richard F. Larsen, incumbent lieutenant governor
- Robert P. McCarney

==== Results ====
Republican primary results
Party	Candidate	Votes	%
Republican	Richard F. Larsen	66,045	67.79
Republican	Robert P. McCarney	31,377	32.21
Total votes		97,422	100.00

== General election ==
=== Candidates ===
- Richard F. Larsen, Republican
- Arthur A. Link, Democratic

=== Results ===
1972 North Dakota gubernatorial election
Party	Candidate	Votes	%	±%
Democratic–NPL	Arthur A. Link	143,899	51.04	▼3.78
Republican	Richard F. Larsen	138,032	48.96	▲5.26
Majority		5,867	2.08	▼9.04
Total votes		281,931	100.00	
Democratic–NPL hold				
