= Lee Kaldor =

American politician

Member of the North Dakota House of Representatives from the 20th district
- In office December 1, 2004 – December 1, 2012
- Preceded by: Carol Niemeier
- Succeeded by: Gail Mooney
- In office December 1, 1988 – December 1, 1996
- Preceded by: David Kent
- Succeeded by: Carol Niemeier

Personal details
- Born: February 20, 1951 (age 75) Mayville, North Dakota, U.S.
- Party: Democratic
- Education: Mayville State University (BS); University of Mary (MM)

Lee Kaldor (born February 20, 1951) is an American politician who served in the North Dakota House of Representatives from the 20th district from 1988 to 1996, when he ran for governor, and again from 2004 to 2012. He is a member of the North Dakota Democratic-NPL Party.

Party political offices
Preceded by Nicholas Spaeth	Democratic nominee for Governor of North Dakota; 1996	Succeeded by Heidi Heitkamp
