= 1968 North Dakota gubernatorial election =

- November 5, 1968
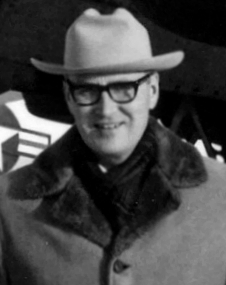

| Nominee | William L. Guy | Robert P. McCarney |
| Party | Democratic–NPL | Republican |
| Popular vote | 135,955 | 108,382 |
| Percentage | 54.82% | 43.70% |
- County results Guy: 50–60% 60–70% McCarney: 40–50% 50–60% 60–70% Tie: 40–50%
Governor before election
William L. Guy
Democratic–NPL
Elected Governor
William L. Guy
Democratic–NPL

The 1968 North Dakota gubernatorial election was held on November 5, 1968. Incumbent Democrat William L. Guy defeated Republican nominee Robert P. McCarney with 54.82% of the vote.

== Primary elections ==
Primary elections were held on September 3, 1968.

=== Democratic primary ===
==== Candidates ====
- William L. Guy, incumbent Governor

==== Results ====
Democratic primary results
| Party | Candidate | Votes | % |
|---|---|---|---|
| Democratic–NPL | William L. Guy (inc.) | 32,830 | 100.00 |
| Total votes | | 32,830 | 100.00 |

=== Republican primary ===
==== Candidates ====
- Robert P. McCarney
- Edward W. Doherty

==== Results ====
Republican primary results
| Party | Candidate | Votes | % |
|---|---|---|---|
| Republican | Robert P. McCarney | 47,324 | 52.48 |
| Republican | Edward W. Doherty | 42,845 | 47.52 |
| Total votes | | 90,169 | 100.00 |

== General election ==
=== Candidates ===
Major party candidates

- William L. Guy, Democratic
- Robert P. McCarney, Republican

Other candidates

- Leo Landsberger, Independent

=== Results ===
1968 North Dakota gubernatorial election
| Party | Candidate | Votes | % | ±% |
|---|---|---|---|---|
| Democratic–NPL | William L. Guy (inc.) | 135,955 | 54.82 | ▼0.92 |
| Republican | Robert P. McCarney | 108,382 | 43.70 | ▼0.56 |
| Taxpayers Revival Ticket | Leo Landsberger | 3,663 | 1.48 | N/A |
| Majority | | 27,575 | 11.12 | ▼0.37 |
| Total votes | | 247,998 | 100.00 | |
| Democratic–NPL hold | | | | |
