= North Dakota Democratic–Nonpartisan League Party =

North Dakota state affiliate of the Democratic Party

North Dakota Democratic–Nonpartisan League
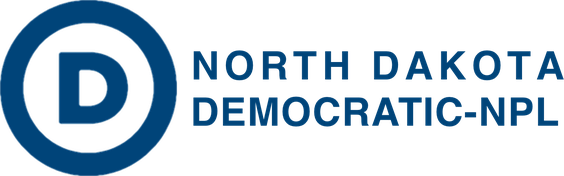
- Abbreviation: D-NPL
- Chairperson: Adam Goldwyn
- Senate leader: Kathy Hogan
- House leader: Zac Ista
- Founded: 1956
- Merger of: North Dakota Democratic Party and Nonpartisan League
- Headquarters: 1325 23rd St S Suite B Fargo, ND 58103; 46.860146°N 96.81786°W
- National affiliation: Democratic Party
- Colors: Blue
- North Dakota Senate: 5 / 47
- North Dakota House of Representatives: 11 / 94

Website
- demnpl.com

The North Dakota Democratic–Nonpartisan League Party (abbreviated Democratic-NPL or simply D-NPL) is the North Dakota affiliate of the national Democratic Party. It was formed by the 1956 merger of the state Democratic Party with the Nonpartisan League; the state previously had a three-party political system. The D-NPL is one of only two state Democratic Party affiliates to have a different name from the central party, the other being the neighboring Minnesota Democratic–Farmer–Labor Party.

The party holds five seats in the North Dakota Senate, and eleven seats in the North Dakota House of Representatives.

== History ==
The North Dakota Democratic–Nonpartisan League Party has roots in the Progressive Era of American history. At the end of the 19th century and beginning of the 20th century, progressives – including lawyers, merchants, editors, and professors – joined both the Republican Party, which had strong control of state politics, as well as the state Democratic Party, the progressive faction of which called itself "the party of the laborer and the farmer." Although they did not alter the control of the Republican Party during this era, progressives found support in the Norwegian-settled state, especially in the east. By 1906, progressive sympathies were growing in opposition to what most saw as complete control of state politics by the railway companies. The initial organization and calls for reform laid a foundation that would soon grow into a statewide socialist workers' movement that eventually spread throughout the Midwest.

=== 1906 through 1915 ===
The prewar decade was marked by a series of progressive successes, starting with progressive Democrat John Burke's election as governor in 1906. Republican Alexander McKenzie's conservative political machine still controlled the Senate, but the House of Representatives was filled with progressive Democrats and Republicans, who managed to introduce many anti-railroad bills despite staunch opposition by lobbyists. Progressive reforms and legislation were passed during this time, including a direct primary law, a joint resolution for a constitutional amendment for initiative and referendum power, a public library commission law, and laws to enforce prohibition. Subsequent years would see the end of Alexander McKenzie and his Republican political machine. By 1908, the first State electoral primaries solidified his retirement. That year the Republican Party, free from McKenzie's conservative influence, crafted a progressive party platform. Progressive Democratic Governor John Burke enjoyed support of progressive Republicans.

North Dakota again demonstrated its progressive sympathies in 1912, when the state held the first United States Presidential Preference Primary on March 19. North Dakota Republicans favored progressive presidential candidate Robert M. La Follette over Theodore Roosevelt and William Howard Taft. Though an angry Roosevelt formed the Progressive Party after losing the Republican nomination to Taft, he had little support from North Dakota, where many Progressives distrusted his backers, George Walbridge Perkins of the J. P. Morgan group and International Harvester. Because of such opposition, Woodrow Wilson carried the state in November. Republican Louis B. Hanna was elected governor in 1912 and 1914. Once in office, he and his legislative allies halted the creation of a state-operated grain elevator, which may have convinced progressives to unite in 1915.

=== Rise of the Nonpartisan League ===
When Arthur C. Townley came to Bismarck, North Dakota, in 1915, he saw strife between a conservative legislature and farmers' interest groups. With his background in organizing farmers for the Socialist Party (socialist activity had begun in North Dakota in 1900 when Arthur Basset organized a socialist club in Fargo), Townley brought his expertise to North Dakota. He knew that with the recent strife in Bismarck between a conservative legislature and the American Society of Equity and its farm following, the time was ripe for a political revolution. Townley resolved to organize the farmers so that they could control the primaries, whether it be Republicans or Democrats or both. This was the organization of the Farmers Nonpartisan League (later called the National Nonpartisan League). Townley organized the farmers of the state together for united action in nominating at the primaries and electing at the polls the men of their own choosing and men who would carry out their programs.

The method of organization was simple, scientific and successful. Organizers carefully went forth in ever increasing numbers to sell the idea to the farmers and to get their support for the new movement. The league grew quickly. The first members were pledged in February 1915. Before midsummer, there were 10,000 members, and before winter set in, there were 26,000 names enrolled.

The Nonpartisan League membership pledge was $2.50 a year; it later rose to $9 a year. The goals of the league were to use their collective best efforts to secure the nomination and election of men for office within the state who would support legislation to save millions of dollars each year for farmers.

The League program consisted of five planks:

1. State-owned and operated elevators, flour mills, and packing plants
2. State hail insurance
3. Exemption of farm improvements from taxation
4. Fair grain grades, based upon milling and baking values
5. Rural credits at cost

Each was designed to remedy what the farmers conceived as an abuse, and each was to lower the cost of producing and marketing grain.

The determination of the league fulfilled their pledge and many of their planks passed legislation. The growth of far-left sympathies was on the rise in North Dakota. The Socialists had considerable success. They brought in many outside speakers; Eugene V. Debs spoke at a large antiwar rally at Garrison in 1915. By 1912, there were 175 Socialist locals in the state. Rugby and Hillsboro elected Socialist mayors. The party established a weekly paper, the Iconoclast, in Minot, North Dakota.

Throughout the decades, the League pushed for the establishments of state-operated mills, elevators, and banks. The state was not entirely isolationist, just as it was neither entirely liberal nor entirely conservative. By 1952, the Nonpartisan League was itself divided.

=== Toward a two-party system ===
Two factions divided the traditionally liberal Nonpartisan League: on one side the insurgents, on the other, the old guard. Those that called themselves insurgents aligned liberally with pro-farmers' union, pro-organized labor, and pro-Democratic party groups. The insurgents wanted to take the league into the Democratic Party. In 1952, the insurgents formed the Volunteers for Stevenson Committee, to help elect then Democratic Candidate Adlai Stevenson. To the contrary the members of the old guard, also known as the Capitol Crowd, were more conservative, anti-farmers' union, anti-labor, and pro-Republican segment of the league, these members wanted to keep the Nonpartisan League in the Republican Party; they supported Dwight D. Eisenhower in the 1952 presidential race. Over the next four years legislative polarization grew and the Nonpartisan League eventually split in two; in 1956 North Dakota was fundamentally realigned into a two-party system. That year, the Nonpartisan League finally moved into the Democratic Party, and all Republicans joined in one organization. Two statewide parties vied for the votes of North Dakota citizens. Creation of the Democratic–Nonpartisan League Party was codified in March during the League Convention; 173 to 3 voted yes to file candidates in the Democratic column. The new party introduced a full slate of candidates for state office and adopted a liberal platform that included the repeal of the Taft–Hartley Act, creation of a $1.25 an hour minimum wage, and a graduated land tax on property worth $20,000 or more. Two months later in May 1956 the Democratic Convention accepted the Nonpartisan League's candidates and adopted its platform. Republicans in North Dakota also united after conservative supports broke away from the league.

The Executive Committee of the NPL still formally exists within the party structure of the North Dakota Democratic–NPL. It was at one point headed by former State Senator "Buckshot" Hoffner (D-NPL, Esmond), Chairman, and former Lt. Governor Lloyd Omdahl, Secretary.

Although the Democratic Party was still the minority, the number of Democrats in the state legislature increased greatly. Before the league moved into the Democratic Party, there were only five Democrats among the 162 members of both houses of the legislature in 1955. In 1957, the number grew to 28. By 1959, the numbers continued to grow reaching 67, despite dropping to 62 members in 1961. Nevertheless, for the first time in history, North Dakota was becoming a two-party state.

== Recent events ==
North Dakota has one of the lowest unemployment rates of all 50 states. The Nonpartisan League laid a foundation of enriched public ownership and responsibility in such institutions as a state bank. One study has drawn conclusions that publicly operated institutions such as the state bank have helped North Dakota weather economic storms.

The Bank of North Dakota was created to address market failures associated with monopoly power among large financial and business institutions in the early twentieth century. This market power meant that small farming operations had inadequate access to credit. One of the goals of the Nonpartisan League was to remedy limited access to credit by establishing this institution. A measure of the public good brought about by the Bank's establishment that still stands today is what some have identified as the Bank's role in reducing the impact of economic recession. The public-private relationship establishes roles assigned according to what each sector does best, allowing the mutual benefit of public and private banks balancing out inequality and building equality, thus creating an economic safety net for North Dakota citizens. These early roots of the Democratic-Nonpartisan League party have been celebrated for establishing a foundation that rights the state in times of national crisis and provides economic security to generations of the state's farmers.

== Electoral history ==
=== Legislative Leadership ===
- Senate Minority Leader: Kathy Hogan
- Assistant Senate Minority Leader: Josh Boschee
- Senate Minority Caucus Chair: Ryan Braunberger
- House Minority Leader: Zac Ista
- Assistant House Minority Leader: Gretchen Dobervich
- House Minority Caucus Chair: Jayme Davis

=== Members of the State House ===
As of the 69th session of the North Dakota Legislative Assembly (2024-2026), the Democratic–NPL Party has a total of 11 House members.

The 11 members are as follows:

Representative	District
Lisa Finley-DeVille	4th
Jayme Davis	9th
Collette Brown	9th
Liz Conmy	11th
Gretchen Dobervich	11th
LaurieBeth Hager	21st
Mary Schneider	21st
Alisa Mitskog	25th
Zachary M. Ista	43rd
Austin Foss	44th
Karla Rose Hanson	44th

=== Members of the State Senate ===
The five members of the North Dakota Senate are as follows:

Senator	District
Richard Marcellais	9th
Ryan Braunberger	10th
Tim Mathern	11th
Kathy Hogan	21st
Joshua Boschee	44th

=== U.S. House of Representatives ===
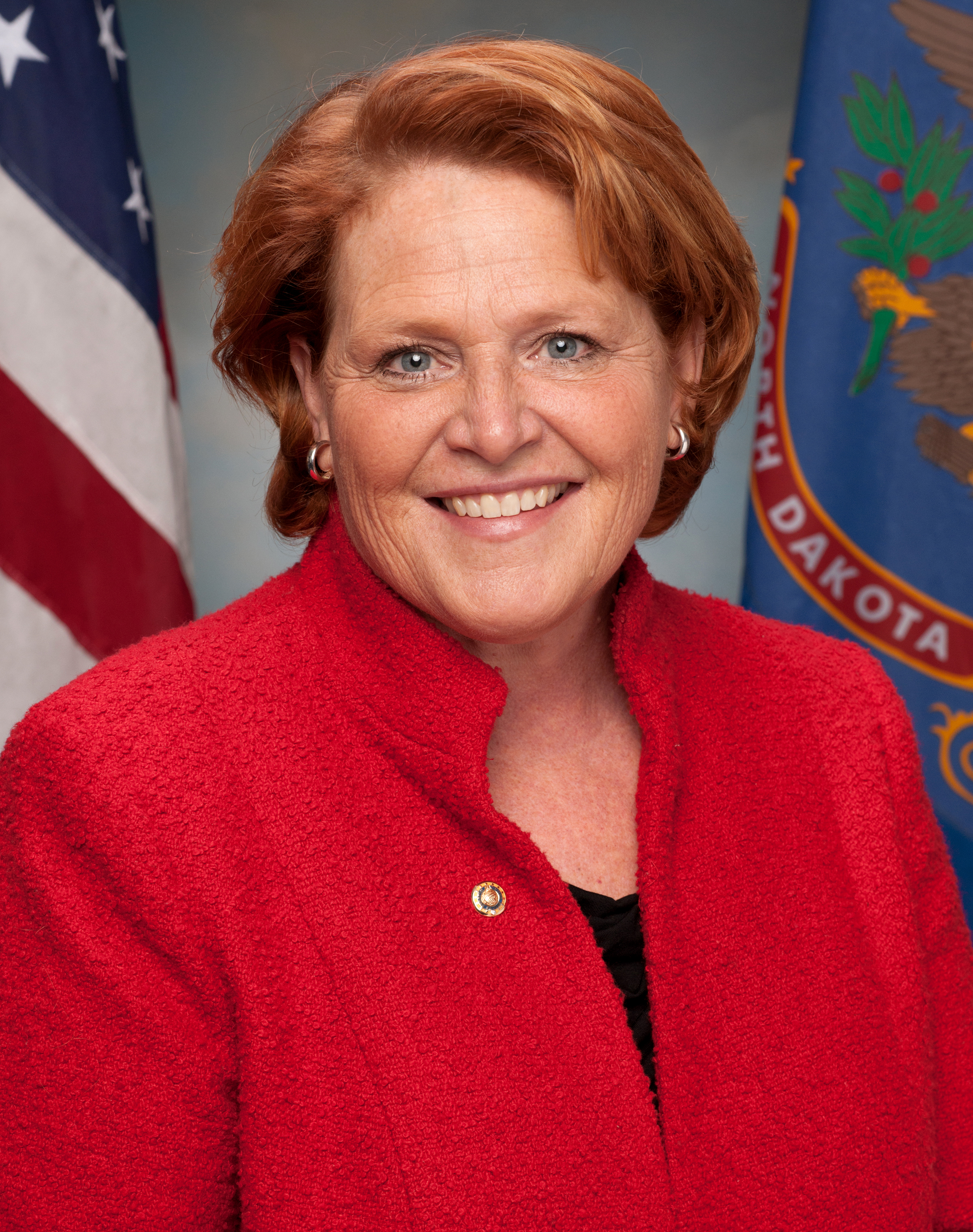
Former US Senator Heidi Heitkamp, the last Dem-NPL candidate to win a statewide election

==== 1st congressional district ====
- 1959–1960 Quentin Burdick

==== 2nd congressional district ====
- 1965–1967 Rolland W. Redlin
- 1971–1973 Arthur A. Link

==== At-large Representative ====
- 1981–1992 Byron Dorgan
- 1993–2011 Earl Pomeroy

=== U.S. Senate history ===
==== Class I ====
- 1960–1992 Quentin N. Burdick
- 1992 Jocelyn Burdick
- 1992–2013 Kent Conrad
- 2013–2019 Heidi Heitkamp

==== Class III ====
- 1987–1992 Kent Conrad
- 1992–2011 Byron Dorgan

== Election results ==
=== Federal ===
==== Presidential ====
North Dakota Democratic–Nonpartisan League Party presidential election results
Election	Presidential ticket	Votes	Vote %	Electoral votes	Nationwide result
1956	Adlai Stevenson/Estes Kefauver	96,742	38.09%	0 / 4	Lost
1960	John F. Kennedy/Lyndon B. Johnson	123,963	44.52%	0 / 4	Won
1964	Lyndon B. Johnson/Hubert Humphrey	149,784	57.97%	4 / 4	Won
1968	Hubert Humphrey/Edmund Muskie	94,769	38.23%	0 / 4	Lost
1972	George McGovern/Sargent Shriver	100,384	35.79%	0 / 3	Lost
1976	Jimmy Carter/Walter Mondale	136,078	45.80%	0 / 3	Won
1980	Jimmy Carter/Walter Mondale	79,189	26.26%	0 / 3	Lost
1984	Walter Mondale/Geraldine Ferraro	104,429	33.80%	0 / 3	Lost
1988	Michael Dukakis/Lloyd Bentsen	127,739	42.97%	0 / 3	Lost
1992	Bill Clinton/Al Gore	99,168	32.18%	0 / 3	Won
1996	Bill Clinton/Al Gore	106,905	40.13%	0 / 3	Won
2000	Al Gore/Joe Lieberman	95,284	33.1%	0 / 3	Lost
2004	John Kerry/John Edwards	111,052	35.50%	0 / 3	Lost
2008	Barack Obama/Joe Biden	141,403	44.50%	0 / 3	Won
2012	Barack Obama/Joe Biden	124,966	38.70%	0 / 3	Won
2016	Hillary Clinton/Tim Kaine	93,758	27.23%	0 / 3	Lost
2020	Joe Biden/Kamala Harris	114,902	31.76%	0 / 3	Won
2024	Kamala Harris/Tim Walz	112,327	30.51%	0 / 3	Lost

==== U.S. House ====
Election	Votes	%	Seats (ND)	±
2016	80,377	23.75	0 / 1	0
2018	114,377	35.57	0 / 1	0
2020	97,970	27.55	0 / 1	0
2022	89,644	37.57	0 / 1	0
2024	109,231	30.36	0 / 1	0
2026	85,892	36.7	0 / 1	0

=== State ===
==== Execituve offices ====
Governor
Election	Gubernatorial candidate/ticket	Votes	%	Result
1956	Wallace E. Warner	104,869	41.54%	Lost ✗
1958	John F. Lord	98,763	46.90%	Lost ✗
1960	William L. Guy	136,148	49.44%	Won ✓
1962	William L. Guy	115,258	50.44%	Won ✓
1964	William L. Guy	146,414	55.74%	Won ✓
1968	William L. Guy	135,955	54.82%	Won ✓
1972	Arthur A. Link	143,899	51.04%	Won ✓
1976	Arthur A. Link/Wayne Sanstead	153,309	51.58%	Won ✓
1980	Arthur A. Link/Wayne Sanstead	140,391	46.39%	Lost ✗
1984	George A. Sinner/Ruth Meiers	173,922	55.32%	Won ✓
1988	George A. Sinner/Lloyd Omdahl	179,094	59.88%	Won ✓
1992	Nicholas Spaeth/Julie Hill	123,845	40.62%	Lost ✗
1996	Lee Kaldor/Barbara Pyle	89,349	33.81%	Lost ✗
2000	Heidi Heitkamp/Aaron Krauter	130,144	44.97%	Lost ✗
2004	Joe Satrom/Deb Mathern	84,877	27.39%	Lost ✗
2008	Tim Mathern/Merle Boucher	74,279	23.53%	Lost ✗
2012	Ryan Taylor/Ellen Chaffee	109,048	34.31%	Lost ✗
2016	Marvin Nelson/Joan Heckaman	65,855	19.39%	Lost ✗
2020	Shelley Lenz/Ben Vig	90,789	25.38%	Lost ✗
2024	Merrill Piepkorn/Patrick Hart	94,043	25.98%	Lost ✗

=== Mayors ===
- Fargo: Josh Boschee
- Surrey: Michael Thiesen

== Elections held before the merger ==
=== Presidential Elections ===
Election	Democratic Ticket	Total Vote	Voteshare	Result	National Result
1912	Woodrow Wilson/Thomas R. Marshall	29,555	34.14%	Won	Won
1916	Woodrow Wilson/Thomas R. Marshall	55,206	47.84%	Won	Won
1920	James M. Cox/Franklin D. Roosevelt	37,422	18.19%	Lost	Lost
1924	John W. Davis/Charles W. Bryan	13,858	6.96%	Lost	Lost
1928	Al Smith/Joseph T. Robinson	106,648	44.46%	Lost	Lost
1932	Franklin D. Roosevelt/John Nance Garner	178,350	69.59%	Won	Won
1936	Franklin D. Roosevelt/John Nance Garner	163,148	59.60%	Won	Won
1940	Franklin D. Roosevelt/Henry A. Wallace	124,036	44.18%	Lost	Won
1944	Franklin D. Roosevelt/Harry S. Truman	100,144	45.48%	Lost	Won
1948	Harry S. Truman/Alben W. Barkley	95,812	43.41%	Lost	Won
1952	Adlai Stevenson II/John Sparkman	76,694	28.39%	Lost	Lost

== See also ==
- List of political parties in North Dakota
- Politics of North Dakota
- North Dakota Republican Party – North Dakota affiliate of the Republican Party
- Political party strength in North Dakota
