= 1958 North Dakota gubernatorial election =

- November 4, 1958
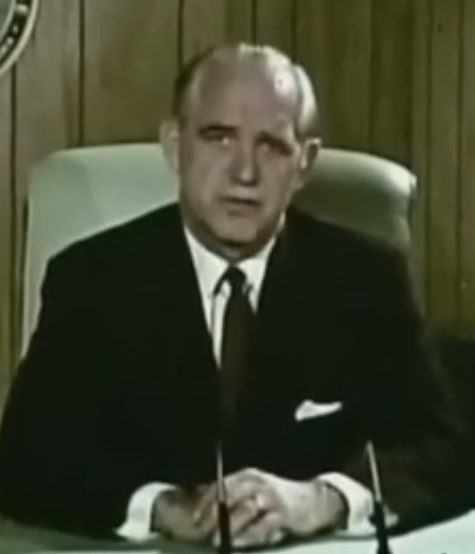

Nominee	John E. Davis	John F. Lord
Party	Republican	Democratic–NPL
Popular vote	111,836	98,763
Percentage	53.10%	46.90%
- County results Davis: 50–60% 60–70% 70–80% Lord: 50–60% 60–70%
Governor before election
John E. Davis
Republican
Elected Governor
John E. Davis
Republican

The 1958 North Dakota gubernatorial election was held on November 4, 1958. Incumbent Republican John E. Davis defeated Democratic nominee John F. Lord with 53.10% of the vote.

== Primary elections ==
Primary elections were held on June 24, 1958.

=== Democratic primary ===
==== Candidates ====
- John F. Lord, attorney
- Art Ford Sr.

==== Results ====
Democratic primary results
Party	Candidate	Votes	%
Democratic–NPL	John F. Lord	26,447	55.42
Democratic–NPL	Art Ford Sr.	21,271	44.58
Total votes		47,718	100.00

=== Republican primary ===
==== Candidates ====
- John E. Davis, incumbent Governor

==== Results ====
Republican primary results
Party	Candidate	Votes	%
Republican	John E. Davis (inc.)	93,595	100.00
Total votes		93,595	100.00

== General election ==
=== Candidates ===
- John E. Davis, Republican
- John F. Lord, Democratic

=== Results ===
1958 North Dakota gubernatorial election
Party	Candidate	Votes	%	±%
Republican	John E. Davis (inc.)	111,836	53.10	▼5.40
Democratic–NPL	John F. Lord	98,763	46.90	▲5.40
Majority		13,073	6.21	▼10.70
Total votes		210,599	100.00	
Republican hold				
