= Wayne Sanstead =

American politician

Wayne Godfrey Sanstead

18th North Dakota Superintendent of Public Instruction
- In office January 1, 1985 – January 1, 2013
- Governor: George A. Sinner; Ed Schafer; John Hoeven; Jack Dalrymple
- Preceded by: Joseph Crawford
- Succeeded by: Kirsten Baesler

31st Lieutenant Governor of North Dakota
- In office January 2, 1973 – January 6, 1981
- Governor: Art Link
- Preceded by: Richard F. Larsen
- Succeeded by: Ernest Sands

Member of the North Dakota Senate from the 5th district
- In office 1971–1973
- Succeeded by: Rolland W. Redlin

Member of the North Dakota House of Representatives
- In office 1965–1970

Personal details
- Born: April 16, 1935 (age 91) Hot Springs, Arkansas, U.S.
- Party: Democratic
- Spouse: Mary Jane Bober
- Education: St. Olaf College, B.A., 1957 Northfield, Minnesota; Northwestern University, M.A. in Speech in 1967; University of North Dakota, Doctorate in secondary education.
- Profession: Teacher

Wayne Godfrey Sanstead (born April 16, 1935) served as the North Dakota Superintendent of Public Instruction from 1985 to January 1, 2013, and from 1972 to 1981 as the 31st lieutenant governor of North Dakota.

== Early life ==
Sanstead was born in Hot Springs, Arkansas, on April 16, 1935, to Godfrey A. and Clara (Buen) Sanstead. Sanstead married Mary Jane Bober on June 16, 1957. They have two children, Timothy Wayne & Jonathan Paul.

== Education ==
In 1957 Sanstead received his B.A. from St. Olaf College, and in 1967 his Master of Arts in Speech from Northwestern University. Stanstead earned his doctorate in secondary education from the University of North Dakota.

== Political career ==
Sanstead was the longest serving chief state school officer in the United States. Previously, Sanstead served eight years in the North Dakota House of Representatives (1965–1970), two years in the N.D. Senate (1971–1973), and as the 31st Lieutenant Governor of North Dakota serving under Governor Art Link (1973–1981).

Party political offices
Preceded by Charles Tighe	Democratic nominee for Lieutenant Governor of North Dakota; 1972, 1976, 1980	Succeeded by Ruth Meiers
Political offices
Preceded by Richard F. Larsen	Lieutenant Governor of North Dakota; 1973–1981	Succeeded by Ernest Sands
Preceded by Joseph Crawford	North Dakota Superintendent of Public Instruction; 1985–2013	Succeeded by Kirsten Baesler
