= George A. Sinner =

American politician

George Sinner
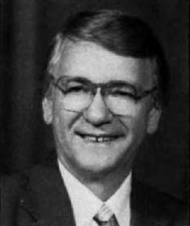
- Photograph of Sinner

29th Governor of North Dakota
- In office January 1, 1985 – December 15, 1992
- Lieutenant: Ruth Meiers; Lloyd Omdahl
- Preceded by: Allen I. Olson
- Succeeded by: Ed Schafer

Member of the North Dakota Senate from the 10th district
- In office December 1, 1962 – December 1, 1966
- Preceded by: John E. Yunker
- Succeeded by: Ernest G. Pyle

Personal details
- Born: George Albert Sinner; May 29, 1928 Fargo, North Dakota, U.S.
- Died: March 9, 2018 (aged 89) Fargo, North Dakota, U.S.
- Party: Democratic
- Spouse: Jane Baute
- Children: 10, including George
- Education: Saint John's University, Minnesota (BA)

Military service
- Allegiance: United States
- Branch/service: United States Air Force
- Years of service: 1950–1951
- Unit: Air National Guard
- Battles/wars: Korean War

George Albert Sinner (May 29, 1928 – March 9, 2018) was an American politician who served as the 29th governor of North Dakota from 1985 to 1992. He served two four-year terms and was the most recent governor of North Dakota from his party, the North Dakota Democratic–Nonpartisan League Party.

== Early life and education ==
Sinner was born on May 29, 1928, in Fargo and was raised in Casselton, the youngest of four children to Albert Francis Sinner, a farmer and bookkeeper for Ford Motor Co., and his wife, Katherine Augusta Wild.

Sinner attended Saint John's Preparatory School, a college prep boarding school in Collegeville, Minnesota, graduating in 1946. In 1950, he received a degree in philosophy from Saint John's University in Collegeville. He served in the United States Air National Guard with the 178th Fighter Squadron from 1950 to 1951 before beginning a career in politics in the late 1950s.

Sinner received honorary doctorate degrees from North Dakota State University, University of North Dakota and his alma mater, St. John's University.

== Career ==
Sinner was elected to the North Dakota Senate in 1962. He served one four-year term until 1966, and failed to win reelection. He also ran for United States Congress in North Dakota's 1st congressional district against Mark Andrews in 1964.

Coming from a background of farming, Sinner served as president of the Red River Valley Sugarbeet Growers Association Board from 1975 to 1979. During that time, he chaired an ad hoc farm commodity group that was responsible for funding and constructing the greenhouse complex and the Northern Crops Institute at North Dakota State University in Fargo. He served as a member of many other boards and organizations, including the North Dakota Broadcasting Council and the State Board of Higher Education. During his time on the State Board of Higher Education, he helped craft the "Tri-college" system currently used by NDSU, MSUM and Concordia College, Moorhead. This program allows students attending one of the schools to take classes not offered there at one of the others.

=== Governor of North Dakota 1985-1992 ===
Sinner was elected governor of North Dakota in 1984 and reelected in 1988. The starting date of Sinner's first term was disputed with defeated outgoing Governor Allen I. Olson. Sinner held that the term started January 1 and Olson held that the term began on January 6, four years after his own term began. At that time, the date was not clearly set forth in either state law or the state constitution. The North Dakota Supreme Court settled the issue in Sinner's favor on January 5, 1985, one day before Olson would have vacated office anyway. Olson failed to comply with the decision and did not vacate the governor's office until the following day, but Sinner's term was retroactively recognized to have begun on January 1.

During Sinner's governorship, North Dakota suffered through the 1980s Midwestern farm crisis and in 1989 celebrated the state's centennial. The North Dakota National Guard was also called to serve in the Gulf War in 1991 as part of Operation Desert Storm. In Sinner's memoir, "Turning Points," published in 2011, he explains his rationale for declaring the nation's first no-smoking policy in a state capitol building and also details the emergency, middle-of-the-night "heart flight" he ordered to deliver a donor heart to a waiting infant recipient in San Francisco. The infant continues to thrive. Sinner did not seek a third term and was succeeded by Republican Ed Schafer.

=== Later career ===
Following his second term, Sinner served as Vice President of Public and Government Relations for the Crystal Sugar Company in Moorhead, Minnesota. Throughout his career, he remained active in his farming operation near Casselton. Sinner's son George B. Sinner served in the North Dakota Senate from 2013 to 2017.

== Personal life ==
Sinner was married to Elizabeth Jane Baute on August 10, 1951, and had 10 children (Robert, George, Elizabeth, Martha, Paula, Mary Jo, James, Gerard, Joseph, and Eric). He died on March 9, 2018, at age 89, at Eventide Senior Living Communities, in Fargo, North Dakota. At the time of his death, he was the last surviving North Dakota governor from the Democratic-NPL party.

Party political offices
Preceded by Arthur A. Link	Democratic nominee for Governor of North Dakota; 1984, 1988	Succeeded by Nicholas Spaeth
Political offices
Preceded by Allen I. Olson	Governor of North Dakota; 1985–1992	Succeeded by Ed Schafer
