= Ernest Sands =

American politician

Ernest M. Sands

32nd Lieutenant Governor of North Dakota
- In office January 6, 1981 – January 1, 1985
- Governor: Allen I. Olson
- Preceded by: Wayne Sanstead
- Succeeded by: Ruth Meiers

Member of the North Dakota Senate
- In office 1967–1970; 1973–1980

Personal details
- Born: April 30, 1922 Pincher Creek, Alberta, Canada
- Died: April 9, 2012 (aged 89) Minot, North Dakota, U.S.
- Party: Republican

Ernest M. Sands (April 30, 1922 – April 9, 2012) was a North Dakota Republican Party politician who served as the 32nd lieutenant governor of North Dakota from 1981 to 1985. Sands also served in the North Dakota Senate from 1967 to 1970 and from 1973 to 1980.

== Background ==
Ernest Sands was born in Pincher Creek, Alberta and his parents were United States citizens which made him a United States citizen. In 1930, Sands and his family moved to Minot, North Dakota. He graduated from Minot High School and then went to Minot State Teachers College (now Minot State University). Sands served in the United States Army Air Force during World War II as a Bombardier for the 458th Bomb Group, 755th Squadron (B-24). On October 14, 1944, his plane was shot down over Cologne, Germany and he was able to evade capture for several days. He was eventually captured and spent the rest of the war in Stalag Luft III and Stalag VIIA until he was repatriated by Patton's forces on April 29, 1945. In 1946, Sands received his degree in business administration from the University of North Dakota. Sands and his wife moved to Velva, North Dakota where he owned a funeral home, furniture and hardware businesses. In 1960, he served on the Velva City Council and in 1962 was the mayor of Velva, North Dakota. In 1967, he served in the North Dakota Senate and then Lieutenant Governor of North Dakota 1981–1985. He died in Minot, North Dakota.

== Notes ==
Party political offices
Preceded by Ernest G. Pyle	Republican nominee for Lieutenant Governor of North Dakota; 1980, 1984	Succeeded by Donna Nalewaja
Political offices
Preceded by Wayne Sanstead	Lieutenant Governor of North Dakota; 1981–1985	Succeeded by Ruth Meiers
