= Ruth Meiers =

American politician

33rd Lieutenant Governor of North Dakota
- In office January 1, 1985 – March 19, 1987
- Governor: George A. Sinner
- Preceded by: Ernest Sands
- Succeeded by: Lloyd Omdahl

Personal details
- Born: November 6, 1925
- Died: March 19, 1987 (aged 61)

Ruth Meiers (November 6, 1925 – March 19, 1987) was an American politician and the first female lieutenant governor of North Dakota. She became the 33rd lieutenant governor in 1985. Meiers was diagnosed with lung and brain cancer in 1986 and died in office six months later in March 1987. The Ruth Meiers Hospitality House is named in her honor. Meiers was a social worker in Mountrail County, North Dakota. In 1974, Meiers served in the North Dakota House of Representatives as a Democrat.

Party political offices
Preceded by Wayne Sanstead	Democratic nominee for Lieutenant Governor of North Dakota; 1984	Succeeded by Lloyd Omdahl
Political offices
Preceded by Ernest Sands	Lieutenant Governor of North Dakota; 1985–1987	Succeeded by Lloyd Omdahl

== See also ==
- List of female lieutenant governors in the United States
