= 1954 United States gubernatorial elections =

- November 2, 1954; September 13, 1954 (ME)

34 governorships (Note: Including a special election in Florida.)
	Majority party	Minority party
Party	Democratic	Republican
Seats before	19	29
Seats after	27	21
Seat change	▲8	▼8
Seats up	11	23
Seats won	19	15
- Democratic hold Democratic gain Republican hold No election

United States gubernatorial elections were held on November 2, 1954, in 34 states, concurrent with the House and Senate elections. Elections also took place on September 13 in Maine. The special election in Florida was due to the death of incumbent governor Daniel T. McCarty on September 28, 1953.

In Tennessee, the governor was elected to a 4-year term for the first time, instead of a 2-year term.

== Race summary ==
State	Governor	Party	First elected	Status	Candidates
Alabama	Gordon Persons	Democratic	1950	Incumbent term-limited. Democratic hold.	▌ ✓ Jim Folsom (Democratic) 73.4%; ▌ Tom Abernathy (Republican) 26.6%
Arizona	J. Howard Pyle	Republican	1950	Incumbent lost re-election. Democratic gain.	▌ ✓ Ernest McFarland (Democratic) 52.5%; ▌ J. Howard Pyle (Republican) 47.5%
Arkansas	Francis Cherry	Democratic	1952	Incumbent lost renomination. Democratic hold.	▌ ✓ Orval Faubus (Democratic) 62.1%; ▌ Pratt Remmel (Republican) 37.9%
California	Goodwin Knight	Republican	1953 (Note: Knight became governor when incumbent (Earl Warren) resigned.)	Incumbent re-elected.	▌ ✓ Goodwin Knight (Republican) 56.8%; ▌ Richard P. Graves (Democratic) 43.2%
Colorado	Daniel I. J. Thornton	Republican	1950	Incumbent retired. Democratic gain.	▌ ✓ Edwin C. Johnson (Republican) 53.6%; ▌ Donald G. Brotzman (Democratic) 46.4%
Connecticut	John Davis Lodge	Republican	1950	Incumbent lost re-election. Democratic gain.	▌ ✓ Abraham Ribicoff (Democratic) 49.50%; ▌John Davis Lodge (Republican) 49.16%; ▌Jasper McLevy (Socialist) 1.19%; ▌Vivien Kellems (write-in) (Ind. Rep.) 0.15%
Florida (special)	Charley Eugene Johns	Democratic	1953 (Note: Johns became governor in 1953 when predecessor (Daniel T. McCarty) died. As then-president of the Florida Senate, Johns became acting governor.)	Incumbent lost renomination. Democratic hold.	▌ ✓ LeRoy Collins (Democratic) 80.4%; ▌ J. Thomas Watson (Note: Watson died on August 25, 1954, but remained on the ballot paper.) (Republican) 19.5%
Georgia	Herman Talmadge	Democratic	1948	Incumbent term-limited. Democratic hold.	Primary results: ▌ ✓ Marvin Griffin (Democratic) 36.32% (302); ▌ Melvin E. Thompson (Democratic) 25.07% (56); ▌ Tom Linder (Democratic) 13.50%; ▌ Fred Hand (Democratic) 12.09%; ▌ Charlie Gowen (Democratic) 11.42%; ▌ Grace Wilkey Thomas (Democratic) 0.97%; ▌ Ben Garland (Democratic) 0.44%; General election: ▌ Marvin Griffin (Democratic) 99.98%
Idaho	Len Jordan	Republican	1950	Incumbent term-limited. Republican hold.	▌ ✓ Robert E. Smylie (Republican) 54.2%; ▌ Clark Hamilton (Democratic) 45.8%
Iowa	William S. Beardsley	Republican	1948	Incumbent retired. Republican hold.	▌ ✓ Leo Hoegh (Republican) 51.4%; ▌ Clyde E. Herring (Democratic) 48.4%; ▌ Howard H. Tyler (Independent) 0.3%
Kansas	Edward F. Arn	Republican	1950	Incumbent retired. Republican hold.	▌ ✓ Fred Hall (Republican) 53.0%; ▌ George Docking (Democratic) 46.0%; ▌ Chester A. Roberts (Prohibition) 0.9%; ▌ W.W. Tamplin (Socialist) 0.16%
Maine	Burton M. Cross	Republican	1952	Incumbent lost re-election. Democratic gain.	▌ ✓ Edmund Muskie (Democratic) 54.5%; ▌ Burton M. Cross (Republican) 45.5%
Maryland	Theodore McKeldin	Republican	1950	Incumbent re-elected.	▌ ✓ Theodore McKeldin (Republican) 54.5%; ▌Curley Byrd (Democratic) 45.6%
Massachusetts	Christian Herter	Republican	1952	Incumbent re-elected.	▌ ✓ Christian Herter (Republican) 51.8%; ▌ Robert F. Murphy (Democratic) 47.8%; ▌Larence Gilfedder (Socialist Labor) 0.30%; ▌Guy S. Williams (Prohibition) 0.14%
Michigan	G. Mennen Williams	Democratic	1948	Incumbent re-elected.	▌ ✓ G. Mennen Williams (Democratic) 55.6%; ▌ Donald S. Leonard (Republican) 44.1%; ▌E. Harold Munn (Prohibition) 0.27%; ▌Theos A. Grove (Socialist Labor) 0.05%; ▌Frank Lovell (Socialist Workers) 0.03%
Minnesota	C. Elmer Anderson	Republican	1951 (Note: Anderson became governor in 1951 when predecessor (Luther Youngdahl) resigned.)	Incumbent lost re-election. Democratic gain.	▌ ✓ Orville Freeman (DFL) 52.7%; ▌ C. Elmer Anderson (Republican) 46.8%; ▌ Ross P. Schelin (Industrial Government) 0.5%
Nebraska	Robert B. Crosby	Republican	1952	Incumbent retired. Republican hold.	▌ ✓ Victor Anderson (Republican) 60.3%; ▌ William Ritchie (Democratic) 39.7%
Nevada	Charles H. Russell	Republican	1950	Incumbent re-elected.	▌ ✓ Charles H. Russell (Republican) 53.1%; ▌ ✓ Vail Pittman (Democratic) 46.9%
New Hampshire	Hugh Gregg	Republican	1952	Incumbent retired. Republican hold.	▌ ✓ Lane Dwinell (Republican) 55.1%; ▌ John Shaw (Democratic) 44.9%
New Mexico	Edwin L. Mechem	Republican	1950	Incumbent retired. Democratic gain.	▌ ✓ John F. Simms (Democratic) 57.0%; ▌ Alvin Stockton (Republican) 43.0%
New York	Thomas E. Dewey	Republican	1942	Incumbent retired. Democratic gain.	▌ ✓ W. Averell Harriman (Democratic) 49.61%; ▌ Irving Ives (Republican) 49.40%; ▌ John T. McManus (American Labor) 0.91%; ▌ David L. Weiss (Socialist Workers) 0.05%; ▌ Nathan Karp (Industrial Government) 0.03%
North Dakota	Norman Brunsdale	Republican	1950	Incumbent re-elected.	▌ ✓ Norman Brunsdale (Republican) 64.2%; ▌ Cornelius Bymers (Democratic) 35.8%
Ohio	Frank Lausche	Democratic	1944; 1946 (lost); 1948	Incumbent re-elected.	▌ ✓ Frank Lausche (Democratic) 54.1%; ▌ Jim Rhodes (Republican) 45.9%
Oklahoma	Johnston Murray	Democratic	1950	Incumbent term-limited. Democratic hold.	▌ ✓ Raymond Gary (Democratic) 58.7%; ▌ Reuben K. Sparks (Republican) 41.3%
Oregon	Paul L. Patterson	Republican	1952 (Note: Patterson became governor in 1952 when predecessor (Douglas McKay) resigned.)	Incumbent re-elected.	▌ ✓ Paul L. Patterson (Republican) 56.9%; ▌ Joseph K. Carson (Democratic) 43.1%
Pennsylvania	John S. Fine	Republican	1950	Incumbent term-limited. Democratic gain.	▌ ✓ George M. Leader (Democratic) 53.7%; ▌ Lloyd H. Wood (Republican) 46.2%; ▌ Henry Beitscher (Progressive) 0.1%; ▌ Louis Dirle (Socialist Labor) 0.1%
Rhode Island	Dennis J. Roberts	Democratic	1950	Incumbent re-elected.	▌ ✓ Dennis J. Roberts (Democratic) 57.7%; ▌ Dean J. Lewis (Republican) 41.7%; ▌ Arthur E. Marley (Independent) 0.6%
South Carolina	James F. Byrnes	Democratic	1950	Incumbent term-limited. Democratic hold.	Primary results: ▌ ✓ George Bell Timmerman Jr. (Democratic) 61.34%; ▌ Lester L. Bates (Democratic) 38.66%; General election: ▌ George Bell Timmerman Jr. (Democratic) 100.0%
South Dakota	Sigurd Anderson	Republican	1950	Incumbent term-limited. Republican hold.	▌ ✓ Joe Foss (Republican) 56.7%; ▌ Ed C. Martin (Democratic) 43.3%
Tennessee	Frank G. Clement	Democratic	1952	Incumbent re-elected.	Primary results: ▌ ✓ Frank G. Clement (Democratic) 68.17%; ▌ Gordon W. Browning (Democratic) 27.61%; ▌ Raulston Schoolfield (Democratic) 4.23%; General election: ▌ ✓ Frank G. Clement (Democratic) 87.2%; ▌ John Randolph Neal Jr. (Independent) 12.2%; ▌ W.E. Michel (Republican) 0.5%
Texas	Allan Shivers	Democratic	1949 (Note: Shivers became governor in 1949 when predecessor (Beauford H. Jester) died.)	Incumbent re-elected.	▌ ✓ Allan Shivers (Democratic) 89.4%; ▌ Tod R. Adams (Republican) 10.4%
Vermont	Lee E. Emerson	Republican	1950	Incumbent retired. Republican hold.	▌ ✓ Joseph B. Johnson (Republican) 52.3%; ▌ E. Frank Branon (Democratic) 47.7%
Wisconsin	Walter J. Kohler Jr.	Republican	1950	Incumbent re-elected.	▌ ✓ Walter J. Kohler Jr. (Republican) 51.5%; ▌William Proxmire (Democratic) 48.4%; ▌ Arthur Wepfer (Socialist Labor) 0.2%
Wyoming	Clifford Joy Rogers	Republican	1953 (Note: Rogers became governor in 1953 when predecessor (Frank A. Barrett) resigned.)	Incumbent lost renomination. Republican hold.	▌ ✓ Milward Simpson (Republican) 50.5%; ▌ William M. Jack (Democratic) 49.5%

== Closest races ==
States where the margin of victory was under 1%:

1. New York, 0.21%
2. Connecticut, 0.34%
3. Wyoming, 1.00%

States where the margin of victory was under 5%:

1. Iowa, 3.02%
2. Wisconsin, 3.05%
3. Massachusetts, 3.98%
4. Vermont, 4.57%

States where the margin of victory was under 10%:

1. Arizona, 5.02%
2. Minnesota, 5.93%
3. Nevada, 6.20%
4. Kansas, 7.01%
5. Colorado, 7.12%
6. Pennsylvania, 7.51%
7. Ohio, 8.19%
8. Idaho, 8.48%
9. Maryland, 8.91%
10. Maine, 8.98%

Red denotes states won by Republicans. Blue denotes states won by Democrats.
