= 1946 United States Senate special election in North Dakota =

- June 25, 1946
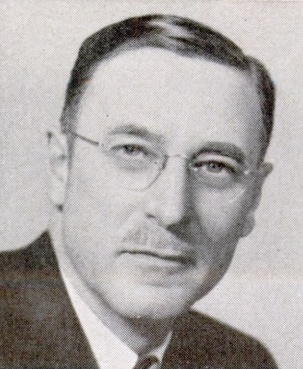

Nominee	Milton Young	P. W. "Bill" Lanier	Gerald Nye
Party	Republican	Democratic	Independent
Popular vote	75,998	37,507	20,848
Percentage	55.54%	27.41%	15.24%
- County results Young: 40–50% 50–60% 60–70% 70–80%
U.S. senator before election
Milton Young
Republican
Elected U.S. Senator
Milton Young
Republican

The 1946 United States Senate special election in North Dakota took place on June 25, 1946. Democratic Senator John Moses, first elected in 1944, died on March 3, 1945, just two months into his term. Republican Governor Fred G. Aandahl appointed State Senator Milton Young to fill the vacancy and a special election was scheduled.

Young ran for re-election and narrowly won the Republican nomination at a state party convention against two opponents, including former Senator Gerald Nye. In the general election, he faced Democratic nominee P. W. "Bill" Lanier, an attorney, and Nye, who was running as an independent following his 1944 loss to Moses and his defeat at the state convention. Young was able to take advantage of the split field to easily win re-election.

== Republican convention ==
Republicans convened in Bismarck for their state convention, the agenda for which included nominating a candidate for the June special election. Young announced that he intended to run for re-election, and former Senator Gerald Nye also announced he would seek the party's nomination. Across the state, county parties elected delegates to the state conventions, which effectively became proxy wars between the state Republican committee, which favored Young, and the Nonpartisan League, which favored Nye, for control of the party apparatus. Ultimately, the Republican establishment won out. Of, the delegates given instructions by their county parties, all of them were directed to vote for Young. The uninstructed delegates were no more amenable to Nye; in Morton County, the convention passed a resolution expressing "unalterable opposition" to Nye's nomination.

Ultimately, Young narrowly won renomination, winning just a handful more delegates than he needed to receive a majority. The second-place finisher was not Nye-who placed a distant third-but instead political newcomer George Schatz. However, after Nye lost the nomination, he announced that he would continue his campaign to the general election as an independent.

Republican convention vote
Candidate	Votes	Percentage
Milton Young	195	51.32%
George Schatz	151	39.74%
Gerald Nye	34	8.95%
Totals	380	100.00%

== Democratic convention ==
At the Democratic convention, attorney P. W. "Bill" Lanier, Jr., a Marine Corps veteran and the son of U.S. Attorney P. W. Lanier, won the party's nomination.

== General election ==
=== Results ===
1946 United States Senate special election in North Dakota
Party	Candidate	Votes	%	±%
Republican	Milton Young (inc.)	75,998	55.54%	+22.50%
Democratic	P. W. "Bill" Lanier	37,507	27.41%	−17.78%
Independent	Gerald Nye	20,848	15.24%	—
Independent	E. A. Johansson	2,473	1.81%	—
Majority		38,491	28.13%	+15.98%
Turnout		136,826		
Republican hold				
