= Herschel Lashkowitz =

American politician (1918–1993)

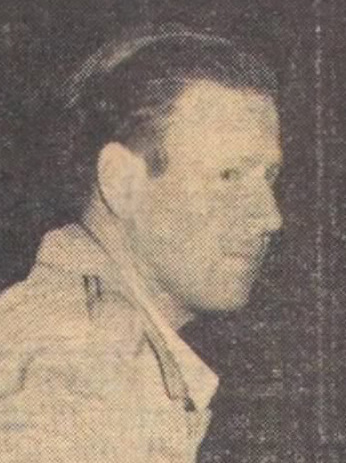
Herschel Lashkowitz in 1957

Herschel Irving Lashkowitz (April 2, 1918 – September 7, 1993) was an American politician from North Dakota, affiliated with the Democratic Party.

== Life and career ==
Lashkowitz's father, Harry, was long involved in politics. Harry Lashkowitz ran unsuccessfully for Cass County State's Attorney in 1918 and 1926, as well as Attorney General of North Dakota in 1930. He later served as Assistant U.S. Attorney and seconded Franklin D. Roosevelt's nomination at the 1936 Democratic National Convention.

Lashkowitz graduated from Fargo's Central High School in 1935 and later attended Harvard Law School. A lawyer and veteran of World War II, Lashkowitz served as mayor of his hometown for twenty years, from 1954 until 1974, when he was defeated for re-election. He also served as a state senator for 18 years.

Lashkowitz was an independent candidate for Governor in 1960, but lost. He was also the Democratic nominee for U.S. Senator (class 3) in 1968, when he was defeated by longtime Republican incumbent Milton Young.

== Electoral history ==
1968 United States Senate election, North Dakota
Party	Candidate	Votes	%	±%
Republican	Milton R. Young	154,968	64.79	
Democratic	Herschel Lashkowitz	80,815	33.79	
Independent	Duane Mutch	3,393	1.42	
Majority				
Turnout		239,176		

== See also ==
- North Dakota United States Senate election, 1968
- United States Senate elections, 1968

Party political offices
Preceded by William Lanier	Democratic nominee for U.S. Senator from North Dakota (Class 3); 1968	Succeeded by William L. Guy
Political offices
Preceded by Murray A. Baldwin	Mayor of Fargo; 1954–1974	Succeeded by Richard A. Hentges
