= 1944 North Dakota gubernatorial election =

- November 7, 1944
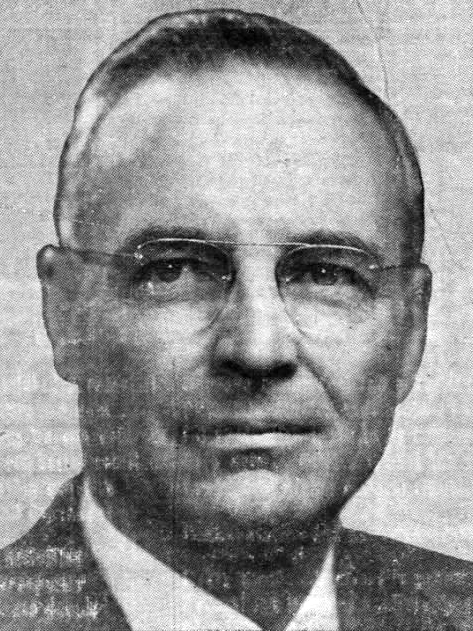

Nominee	Fred G. Aandahl	William T. DePuy	Alvin C. Strutz
Party	Republican	Democratic	Independent
Popular vote	107,863	59,961	38,997
Percentage	52.02%	28.92%	18.81%
- County results Aandahl: 40–50% 50–60% 60–70% 70–80% DePuy: 60–70% Strutz: 30–40% 40–50%
Governor before election
John Moses
Democratic
Elected Governor
Fred G. Aandahl
Republican

The 1944 North Dakota gubernatorial election was held on November 7, 1944. Republican nominee Fred G. Aandahl defeated Democratic nominee William T. DePuy with 52.02% of the vote.

== Primary elections ==
Primary elections were held on June 27, 1944.

=== Democratic primary ===
==== Candidates ====
- William T. DePuy, former North Dakota tax commissioner

==== Results ====
Democratic primary results
Party	Candidate	Votes	%
Democratic	William T. DePuy	13,683	100.00
Total votes		13,683	100.00

=== Republican primary ===
==== Candidates ====
- Fred G. Aandahl, state senator
- Alvin C. Strutz, attorney general of North Dakota

==== Results ====
Republican primary results
Party	Candidate	Votes	%
Republican	Fred G. Aandahl	59,938	54.32
Republican	Alvin C. Strutz	50,402	45.68
Total votes		110,340	100.00

== General election ==
=== Candidates ===
Major party candidates

- Fred G. Aandahl, Republican
- William T. DePuy, Democratic

Other candidates

- Alvin C. Strutz, Independent
- A. M. Wiley, Prohibition

=== Results ===
1944 North Dakota gubernatorial election
Party	Candidate	Votes	%	±%
Republican	Fred G. Aandahl	107,863	52.02	▲9.64
Democratic	William T. DePuy	59,961	28.92	▼28.70
Independent	Alvin C. Strutz	38,997	18.81	N/A
Prohibition	A. M. Wiley	539	0.26	N/A
Majority		47,902	23.10	▲7.86
Total votes		207,360	100.00	
Republican gain from Democratic				
