= 1962 United States Senate election in North Dakota =

- November 6, 1962
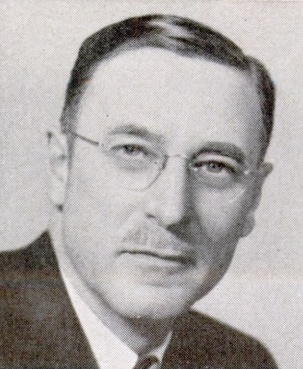

Nominee	Milton Young	William Lanier
Party	Republican	Democratic–NPL
Popular vote	135,705	88,032
Percentage	60.65%	39.35%
- County results Young: 50–60% 60–70% 70–80% Lanier: 50–60%
Senator before election
Milton Young
Republican
Elected Senator
Milton Young
Republican

The 1962 U.S. Senate election for the state of North Dakota was held November 6, 1962. The incumbent, Republican Senator Milton Young, sought and received re-election to his fourth term, defeating North Dakota Democratic-NPL Party candidate William Lanier of Fargo, North Dakota.

Only Young filed as a Republican, and the endorsed Democratic candidate was William Lanier of Fargo, North Dakota, who had previously faced Young in a special election held in 1946 to fill the seat which was vacated by the late John Moses. Lanier is not to be confused with former Governor of North Dakota William Langer. Young and Lanier won the primary elections for their respective parties. No independent candidates sought the senate seat.

== Election results ==
1962 United States Senate election in North Dakota
Party	Candidate	Votes	%	±%
Republican	Milton Young (incumbent)	135,705	60.65%	
Democratic–NPL	William Lanier	88,032	39.35%	
Majority		47,673		
Turnout		223,737		
