= 1960 North Dakota gubernatorial election =

- November 8, 1960
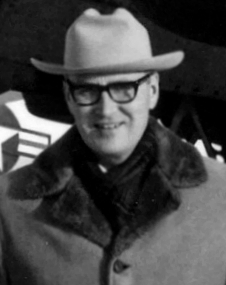

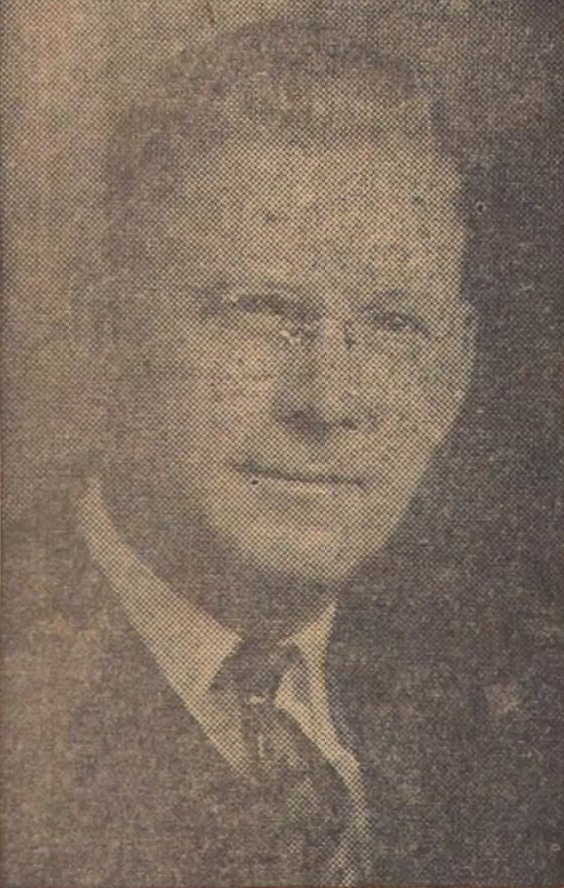

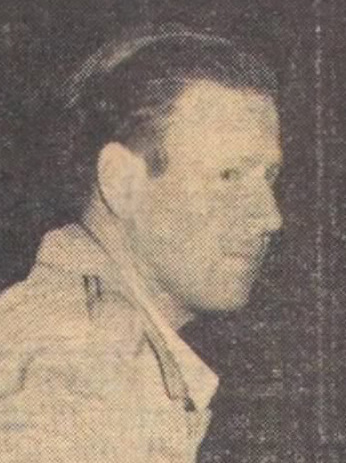
Nominee	William L. Guy	Clarence P. Dahl	Herschel Lashkowitz
Party	Democratic–NPL	Republican	Independent
Popular vote	136,148	122,486	16,741
Percentage	49.44%	44.48%	6.08%
- County results Guy: 40–50% 50–60% 60–70% Dahl: 40–50% 50–60% 60–70%
Governor before election
John E. Davis
Republican
Elected Governor
William L. Guy
Democratic–NPL

The 1960 North Dakota gubernatorial election was held on November 8, 1960. Democratic nominee William L. Guy defeated Republican nominee and Lieutenant Governor Clarence P. Dahl with 49.44% of the vote.

== Primary elections ==
Primary elections were held on June 28, 1960.

=== Democratic primary ===
==== Candidates ====
- William L. Guy, state representative

==== Results ====
Democratic primary results
Party	Candidate	Votes	%
Democratic–NPL	William L. Guy	87,632	100.00
Total votes		87,632	100.00

=== Republican primary ===
==== Candidates ====
- Clarence P. Dahl, incumbent lieutenant governor
- Orris G. Nordhougen, state senator

==== Results ====
Republican primary results
Party	Candidate	Votes	%
Republican	Clarence P. Dahl	86,900	77.57
Republican	Orris G. Nordhougen	25,132	22.43
Total votes		112,032	100.00

== General election ==
=== Candidates ===
Major party candidates

- Clarence P. Dahl, Republican
- William L. Guy, Democratic

Other candidates

- Herschel Lashkowitz, Independent

=== Results ===
1960 North Dakota gubernatorial election
Party	Candidate	Votes	%	±%
Democratic–NPL	William L. Guy	136,148	49.44	▲2.54
Republican	Clarence P. Dahl	122,486	44.48	▼8.62
Independent	Herschel Lashkowitz	16,741	6.08	N/A
Majority		13,662	4.96	▼1.25
Total votes		275,375	100.00	
Democratic–NPL gain from Republican				
