= 1968 United States Senate election in North Dakota =

- November 5, 1968
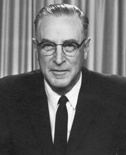

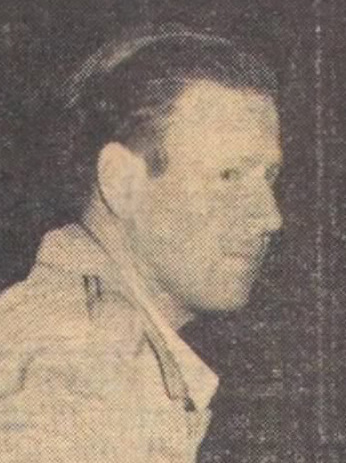
Nominee	Milton Young	Herschel Lashkowitz
Party	Republican	Democratic–NPL
Popular vote	154,968	80,815
Percentage	64.79%	33.79%
- County results Young: 50–60% 60–70% 70–80% 80–90%
U.S. senator before election
Milton Young
Republican
Elected U.S. Senator
Milton Young
Republican

The 1968 U.S. Senate election for the state of North Dakota was held November 5, 1968. The incumbent, Republican Senator Milton Young, sought and received re-election to his fifth term, defeating North Dakota Democratic-NPL Party candidate Herschel Lashkowitz, the mayor of Fargo, North Dakota since 1954.

Only Young filed as a Republican, and the endorsed Democratic candidate was Herschel Lashkowitz of Fargo, North Dakota, who was serving as the mayor of the city since 1954. Young and Lashkowitz won the primary elections for their respective parties.

One independent candidate, Duane Mutch of Larimore, North Dakota, also filed before the deadline. Mutch was later a state senator for the North Dakota Republican Party in the North Dakota Senate from 1959 to 2006 for District 19. He ran as an independent when he did not receive his party's nomination.

== Election results ==
1968 United States Senate election in North Dakota
Party	Candidate	Votes	%	±%
Republican	Milton Young (incumbent)	154,968	64.79%	
Democratic	Herschel Lashkowitz	80,815	33.79%	
Independent	Duane Mutch	3,393	1.42%	
Majority		74,153		
Turnout		239,176		

== See also ==
- 1968 United States Senate elections
