= York, Wisconsin =

York is the name of some places in the U.S. state of Wisconsin:

- York, Clark County, Wisconsin, a town
- York, Dane County, Wisconsin, a town
- York, Green County, Wisconsin, a town
- York, Jackson County, Wisconsin, an unincorporated community
- York Center, Wisconsin, an unincorporated community

== See also ==
- York (disambiguation)
