= Svea Township =

Svea Township may refer to the following townships in the United States:

- Svea Township, Kittson County, Minnesota
- Svea Township, Barnes County, North Dakota
