= 1940 North Dakota gubernatorial election =

- November 5, 1940
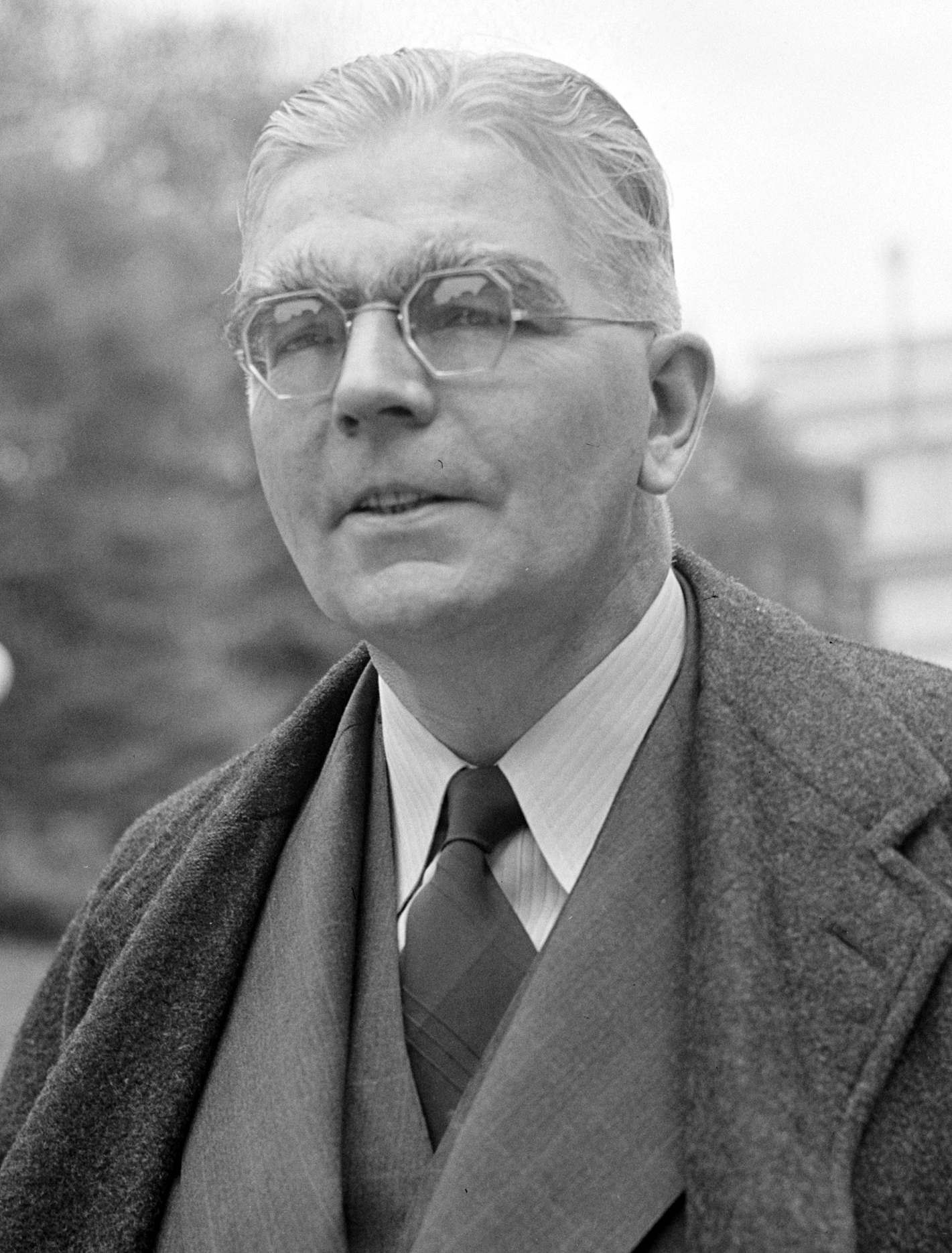

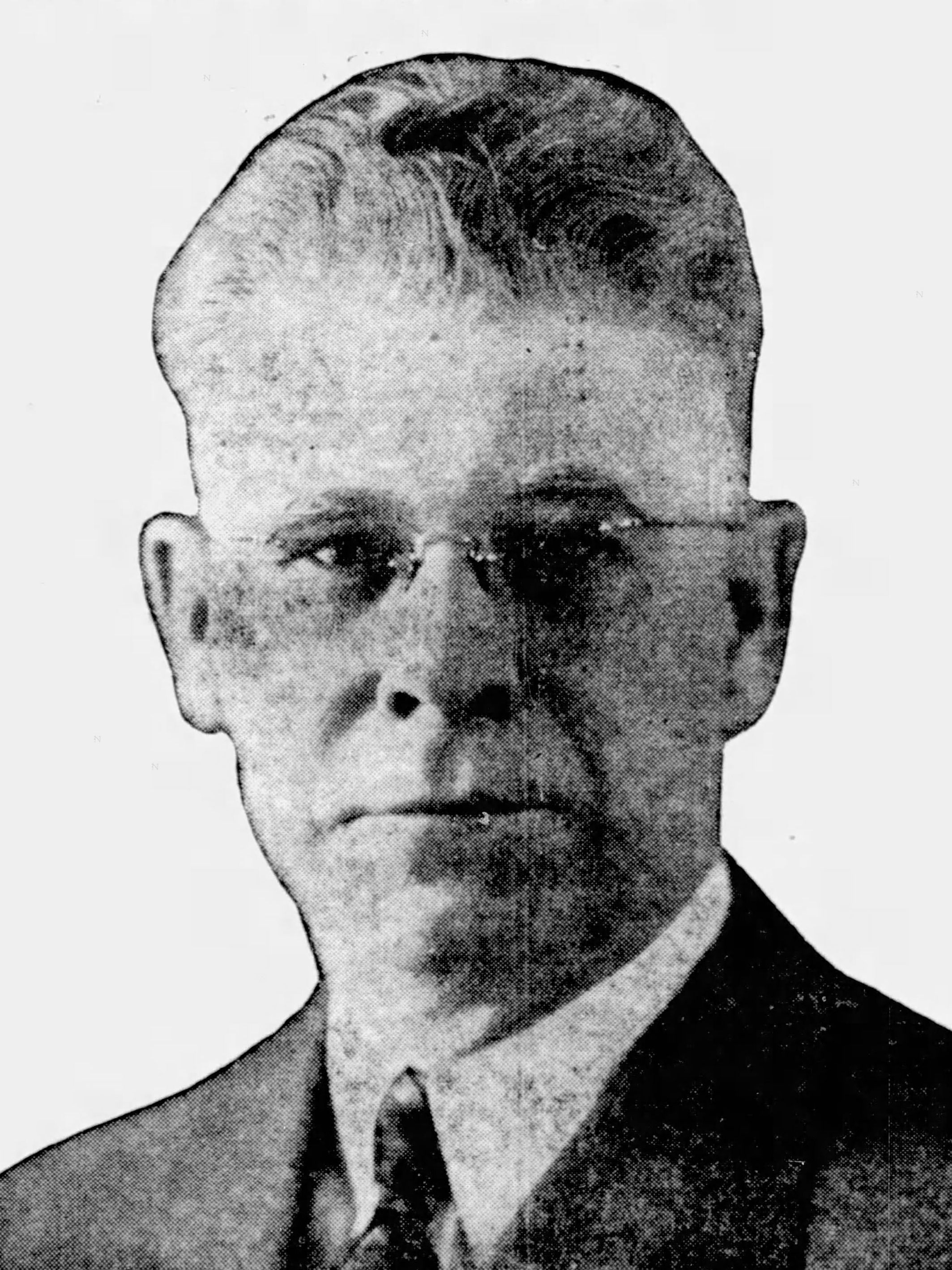
Nominee	John Moses	Jack A. Patterson
Party	Democratic	Republican
Popular vote	173,278	101,287
Percentage	63.11%	36.89%
- County results Moses: 50–60% 60–70% 70–80% 80–90% Patterson: 50–60% 60–70% 70–80%
Governor before election
John Moses
Democratic
Elected Governor
John Moses
Democratic

The 1940 North Dakota gubernatorial election was held on November 5, 1940. Incumbent Democrat John Moses defeated Republican nominee Jack A. Patterson with 63.11% of the vote. This election marked the first time since 1910 that an incumbent Democratic governor was re-elected or won re-election.

== Primary elections ==
Primary elections were held on June 25, 1940.

=== Democratic primary ===
==== Candidates ====
- John Moses, incumbent governor
- C. P. Stone

==== Results ====
Democratic primary results
Party	Candidate	Votes	%
Democratic	John Moses (inc.)	31,992	91.75
Democratic	C. P. Stone	2,877	8.25
Total votes		143,490	100.00

=== Republican primary ===
==== Candidates ====
- Lewis T. Orlady
- Jack A. Patterson, incumbent lieutenant governor

==== Results ====
Republican primary results
Party	Candidate	Votes	%
Republican	Jack A. Patterson	78,690	54.84
Republican	Lewis T. Orlady	64,800	45.16
Total votes		143,490	100.00

== General election ==
=== Candidates ===
- John Moses, Democratic
- Jack A. Patterson, Republican

=== Results ===
1940 North Dakota gubernatorial election
Party	Candidate	Votes	%	±%
Democratic	John Moses (inc.)	173,278	63.11	▲10.64
Republican	Jack A. Patterson	101,287	36.89	▼10.64
Majority		71,991	26.22	▲21.28
Total votes		274,565	100.00	
Democratic hold				
