= 1944 United States Senate election in North Dakota =

- November 7, 1944
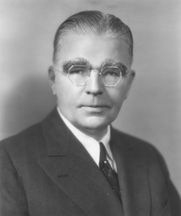

Nominee	John Moses	Gerald Nye	Lynn Stambaugh
Party	Democratic	Republican	Independent Republican
Popular vote	95,102	69,530	44,596
Percentage	45.20%	33.04%	21.19%
- County results Moses: 30–40% 40–50% 50–60% 60–70% Nye: 40–50% 50–60% 60–70% 80–90% Stambaugh: 30–40%
U.S. senator before election
Gerald Nye
Republican
Elected U.S. Senator
John Moses
Democratic

The 1944 United States Senate election in North Dakota took place on November 7, 1944. Incumbent Republican Senator Gerald Nye ran for re-election to his fourth term. He faced a serious challenge to his renomination in the Republican primary, with prominent Fargo attorney Lynn Stambaugh and Congressman Usher L. Burdick running against him. He won with one-third of the vote, defeating Shambaugh, his closest opponent, by fewer than 1,000 votes. In the general election, Stambaugh continued his campaign against Nye as an independent, splitting the Republican vote as Governor John Moses, the Democratic nominee, ran a strong campaign. Though Nye had benefited from crowded general elections before, he bled Republican support to Stambaugh and Moses unseated him with just 45% of the vote. However, just a few months into Moses's term, he died in office, flipping the seat back to Republican control and triggering a June 1946 special election.

== Democratic primary ==
=== Candidates ===
- John Moses, Governor of North Dakota

=== Results ===
Democratic primary
Party	Candidate	Votes	%
Democratic	John Moses	14,650	100.00%
Total votes		14,650	100.00%

== Republican primary ==
=== Candidates ===
- Gerald Nye, incumbent U.S. Senator
- Lynn Stambaugh, Fargo attorney, former national commander of the American Legion
- Usher L. Burdick, U.S. Congressman from North Dakota's at-large congressional district
- A. C. Townley

=== Results ===
Republican primary
Party	Candidate	Votes	%
Republican	Gerald Nye (inc.)	38,191	33.98%
Republican	Lynn Stambaugh	37,219	33.11%
Republican	Usher L. Burdick	35,687	31.75%
Republican	A. C. Townley	1,300	1.16%
Total votes		112,397	100.00%

== General election ==
=== Results ===
1944 United States Senate election in North Dakota
Party	Candidate	Votes	%	±%
Democratic	John Moses	95,102	45.20%	+2.63%
Republican	Gerald Nye (inc.)	69,530	33.04%	−17.08%
Independent Republican	Lynn Stambaugh	44,596	21.19%	—
Independent	Bernard H. O'Laughlin	705	0.34%	—
Independent	L. D. Harris	489	0.23%	—
Majority		25,572	12.15%	+4.59%
Turnout		210,422		
Democratic gain from Republican				
