= 1952 North Dakota gubernatorial election =

- November 4, 1952
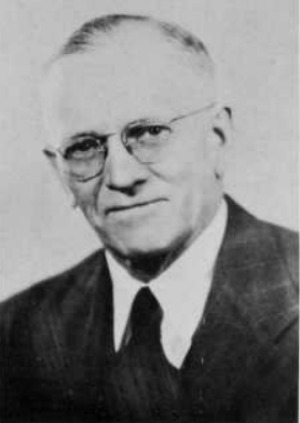

Nominee	Norman Brunsdale	Ole C. Johnson
Party	Republican	Democratic
Popular vote	199,944	53,990
Percentage	78.74%	21.26%
- County results Brunsdale: 50–60% 60–70% 70–80% 80–90% >90%
Governor before election
Norman Brunsdale
Republican
Elected Governor
Norman Brunsdale
Republican

The 1952 North Dakota gubernatorial election was held on November 4, 1952. Incumbent Republican Norman Brunsdale defeated Democratic nominee Ole C. Johnson with 78.74% of the vote.

== Primary elections ==
Primary elections were held on June 24, 1952.

=== Democratic primary ===
==== Candidates ====
- Ole C. Johnson

==== Results ====
Democratic primary results
Party	Candidate	Votes	%
Democratic	Ole C. Johnson	12,130	100.00
Total votes		12,130	100.00

=== Republican primary ===
==== Candidates ====
- Norman Brunsdale, incumbent Governor
- Albert Jacobson, North Dakota State Treasurer

==== Results ====
Republican primary results
Party	Candidate	Votes	%
Republican	Norman Brunsdale (inc.)	109,139	59.90
Republican	Albert Jacobson	73,072	40.10
Total votes		182,211	100.00

== General election ==
=== Candidates ===
- Norman Brunsdale, Republican
- Ole C. Johnson, Democratic

=== Results ===
1952 North Dakota gubernatorial election
Party	Candidate	Votes	%	±%
Republican	Norman Brunsdale (inc.)	199,944	78.74	▲12.45
Democratic	Ole C. Johnson	53,990	21.26	▼12.45
Majority		145,954	57.48	▲24.90
Total votes		253,934	100.00	
Republican hold				
