= Clarence P. Dahl =

American politician (1892–1976)

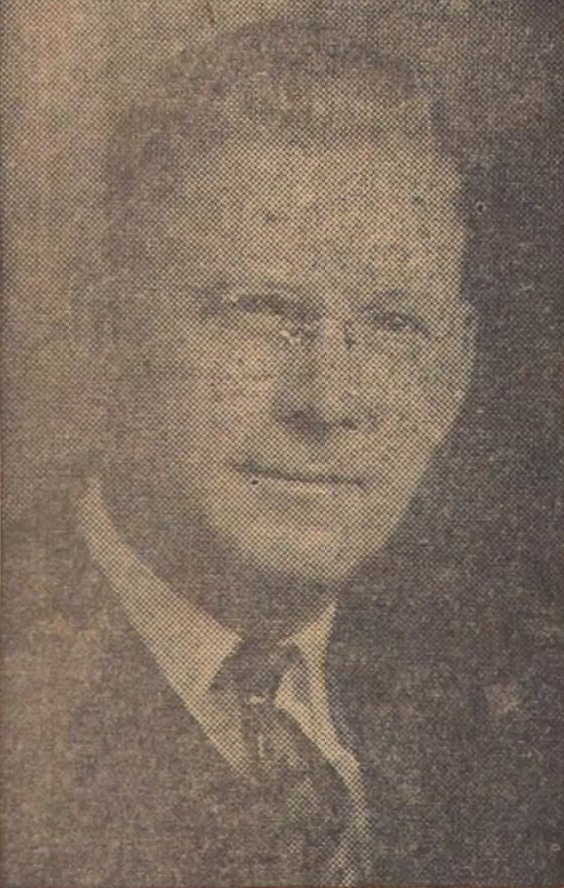
- Dahl in 1942

22nd, 24th & 26th Lieutenant Governor of North Dakota
- In office 1959–1961
- Governor: John E. Davis
- Preceded by: Francis Clyde Duffy
- Succeeded by: Orville W. Hagen
- In office 1953–1957
- Governor: Norman Brunsdale
- Preceded by: Ray Schnell
- Succeeded by: Francis Clyde Duffy
- In office 1945–1951
- Governor: Fred G. Aandahl
- Preceded by: Henry Holt
- Succeeded by: Ray Schnell

Member of the North Dakota Senate
- In office 1950–1952
- In office 1938–1944

Personal details
- Born: March 22, 1892 York, Wisconsin, U.S.
- Died: October 23, 1976 (aged 84)
- Political party: Republican
- Spouse: Ovidia Anderson (m. 1922)
- Children: 3

Clarence P. Dahl (March 22, 1892 – October 23, 1976) was an American politician with the Republican Party who served as the 22nd, 24th and 26th lieutenant governor of North Dakota from 1945 to 1951 serving under Governor Fred G. Aandahl, 1953 to 1957 serving under Governor Clarence N. Brunsdale, and from 1959 to 1961 serving under Governor John E. Davis. He also served in the North Dakota Senate from 1938 to 1944 and from 1950 to 1952.

== Biography ==
Clarence Dahl was born in 1892 in York, Wisconsin. He was the son of Peter Mathiasen Dahl and Ellene (Stensven) Dahl, both of whom were immigrants from Norway. He was educated in the public schools, and at the business college in Winona, Minnesota. He engaged in business as a merchant in Griggs County, North Dakota, and stayed in the business for 23 years. He also was a farmer, an auctioneer, and he owned and supervised 700 acres (2.8 km^{2}) of farm land while serving as lieutenant governor. Dahl established Dahl's Cash Store in Jessie in 1925. The business was sold in 1948, and the family moved to Cooperstown. For a time during the late 1930s, he served as both director and secretary of the Jessie Farmers Elevator.

Dahl had been active in North Dakota politics since 1916, when he was involved with the organization of the Nonpartisan League. He maintained an interest in the league until 1934, when he was one of a group which formed the Progressive Republicans. Dahl entered state office when he was elected as a state senator in 1938; a position he served in until 1944 when he was elected lieutenant governor that year. He served until 1950 when he did not seek re-election. At that time, he returned to the state Senate for one term until he was once again elected lieutenant governor in 1952. He served until 1956 when he did not seek re-election, only to run and win in 1958. He began his final period as lieutenant governor, a period that ended in 1960. Following a four-year stint as director of the State Laboratories Department, he retired from public life.

Dahl married Ovidia Anderson on December 28, 1922, at age 30 and had three children; Phillip, Marjorie, and Robert. He was a member of the Lutheran Church, Knights of Pythias, and Masonic Lodge.

== Other reading ==
- Goldberg, Ray. The Nonpartisan League in North Dakota: A Case Study of Political Action in America (Undergraduate Honor's Thesis, Department of Government, Harvard University. Published by Midwest Printing and Lithographing Company, Fargo, 1948).

Party political offices
Preceded by Quentin Burdick	Republican nominee for Lieutenant Governor of North Dakota; 1944, 1946, 1948	Succeeded by Ray Schnell
Preceded by Ray Schnell	Republican nominee for Lieutenant Governor of North Dakota; 1952, 1954	Succeeded by Francis Clyde Duffy
Preceded by Francis Clyde Duffy	Republican nominee for Lieutenant Governor of North Dakota; 1958	Succeeded by Orville W. Hagen
Preceded by John E. Davis	Republican nominee for Governor of North Dakota; 1960	Succeeded by Mark Andrews
Political offices
Preceded by Henry Holt	Lieutenant Governor of North Dakota; 1945–1951	Succeeded by Ray Schnell
Preceded by Ray Schnell	Lieutenant Governor of North Dakota; 1953–1957	Succeeded by Francis Clyde Duffy
Preceded by Francis Clyde Duffy	Lieutenant Governor of North Dakota; 1959–1961	Succeeded by Orville W. Hagen
