= 1946 North Dakota gubernatorial election =

- November 5, 1946
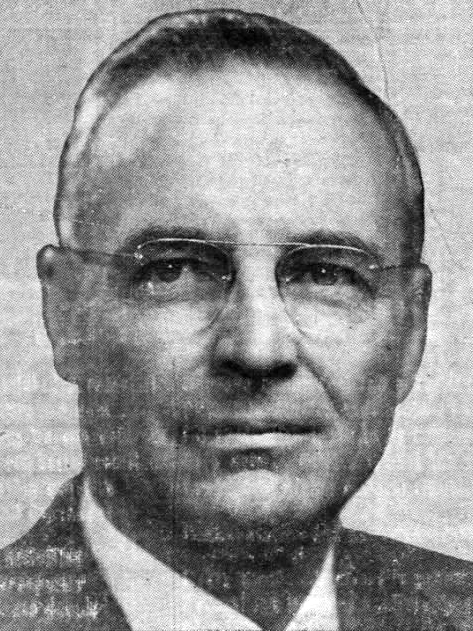

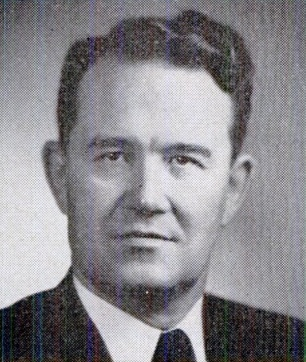
Nominee	Fred G. Aandahl	Quentin Burdick
Party	Republican	Democratic
Popular vote	116,672	52,719
Percentage	68.88%	31.12%
- County results Aandahl: 50–60% 60–70% 70–80% 80–90% Burdick: 50–60%
Governor before election
Fred G. Aandahl
Republican
Elected Governor
Fred G. Aandahl
Republican

The 1946 North Dakota gubernatorial election was held on November 5, 1946. Incumbent Republican Fred G. Aandahl defeated Democratic nominee Quentin Burdick with 68.88% of the vote.

== Primary elections ==
Primary elections were held on June 25, 1946.

=== Democratic primary ===
==== Candidates ====
- Quentin Burdick, attorney

==== Results ====
Democratic primary results
Party	Candidate	Votes	%
Democratic	Quentin Burdick	14,749	100.00
Total votes		14,749	100.00

=== Republican primary ===
==== Candidates ====
- Fred G. Aandahl, incumbent Governor
- Elmer W. Cart, former North Dakota Railroad Commissioner
- Lynn Frazier, former United States Senator

==== Results ====
Republican primary results
Party	Candidate	Votes	%
Republican	Fred G. Aandahl (inc.)	81,953	65.64
Republican	Elmer W. Cart	28,058	22.47
Republican	Lynn Frazier	14,845	11.89
Total votes		124,856	100.00

== General election ==
=== Candidates ===
- Fred G. Aandahl, Republican
- Quentin Burdick, Democratic

=== Results ===
1946 North Dakota gubernatorial election
Party	Candidate	Votes	%	±%
Republican	Fred G. Aandahl (inc.)	116,672	68.88	▲16.86
Democratic	Quentin Burdick	52,719	31.12	▲2.20
Majority		63,953	37.75	▲14.65
Total votes		169,391	100.00	
Republican hold				
