= 1950 United States Senate election in North Dakota =

- November 7, 1950
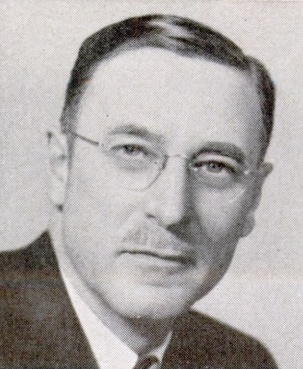

Nominee	Milton Young	Harry O'Brien
Party	Republican	Democratic
Popular vote	126,209	60,507
Percentage	67.59%	32.41%
- County results Young: 50–60% 60–70% 70–80% 80–90% O'Brien: 50–60%
U.S. senator before election
Milton Young
Republican
Elected U.S. Senator
Milton Young
Republican

The 1950 United States Senate election in North Dakota took place on November 7, 1950. Incumbent Republican Senator Milton Young ran for re-election to a second term. In the Republican primary, he faced former Lieutenant Governor Thorstein H. Thoresen, who was endorsed by the Nonpartisan League. After winning the primary in a landslide, he faced State Senator Harry O'Brien, the Democratic nominee, in the general election. Aided by the national Republican landslide, Young defeated O'Brien in a landslide to win re-election.

== Democratic primary ==
=== Candidates ===
- Harry O'Brien, State Senator from Walsh County
- Joseph E. Kyllonen, veteran

=== Results ===
Democratic primary
Party	Candidate	Votes	%
Democratic	Harry O'Brien	24,544	80.16%
Democratic	Joseph E. Kyllonen	6,073	19.84%
Total votes		30,617	100.00%

== Republican primary ==
=== Candidates ===
- Milton Young, incumbent U.S. Senator
- Thorstein H. Thoresen, former Lieutenant Governor of North Dakota

=== Results ===
Republican primary
Party	Candidate	Votes	%
Republican	Milton Young (inc.)	98,458	71.21%
Republican	Thorstein H. Thoresen	39,805	28.79%
Total votes		138,263	100.00%

== General election ==
=== Results ===
1950 United States Senate special election in North Dakota
Party	Candidate	Votes	%	±%
Republican	Milton Young (inc.)	126,209	67.59%	+12.05%
Democratic	Harry O'Brien	60,507	32.41%	+4.99%
Majority		65,702	35.19%	+7.06%
Turnout		186,716		
Republican hold				
