= Ray Schnell =

American politician (1893–1970)

Raphael "Ray" Schnell (May 1, 1893 – April 5, 1970) was a North Dakota Republican Party politician who served as the 23rd lieutenant governor of North Dakota from 1951 to 1953 under Governor Clarence Norman Brunsdale. Schnell also served in the North Dakota House from 1939 to 1940, 1943–1946, and 1963–1964. Schnell died in 1970 of cancer at age 77.

== Notes ==
Party political offices
Preceded by Clarence P. Dahl	Republican nominee for Lieutenant Governor of North Dakota; 1950	Succeeded by Clarence P. Dahl
Political offices
Preceded by Clarence P. Dahl	Lieutenant Governor of North Dakota; 1951–1953	Succeeded by Clarence P. Dahl
