= Francis Clyde Duffy =

American politician

Francis Clyde Duffy (March 20, 1890 – December 19, 1977) was a North Dakota Republican Party politician who served as the 25th lieutenant governor of North Dakota under Governor John E. Davis. Duffy also served in the North Dakota Senate from 1949 to 1956.

== Notes ==
Party political offices
Preceded by Clarence P. Dahl	Republican nominee for Lieutenant Governor of North Dakota; 1956	Succeeded by Clarence P. Dahl
Political offices
Preceded by Clarence P. Dahl	Lieutenant Governor of North Dakota; 1957–1959	Succeeded by Clarence P. Dahl
