= Henry Holt (North Dakota politician) =

American politician

21st Lieutenant Governor of North Dakota
- In office 1943–1944
- Governor: John Moses
- Preceded by: Oscar W. Hagen
- Succeeded by: Clarence P. Dahl

Personal details
- Born: November 13, 1888 Elgin, Illinois
- Died: March 2, 1944 (aged 56) Grand Forks, North Dakota
- Party: Democratic

Henry Holt (November 13, 1888 – March 2, 1944) was an American politician from the U. S. state of North Dakota. He was born in Illinois. Holt resided in Grand Forks, North Dakota. In 1934, he was an unsuccessful candidate for U.S. Senator from North Dakota against incumbent Lynn Frazier. In 1940, he was a delegate to the Democratic National Convention which nominated U.S. President Franklin Delano Roosevelt for a third term. In 1942, he was elected as a Democrat to serve as the 21st lieutenant governor of North Dakota under Governor John Moses from 1943 until his death the following year of lung cancer. Upon learning of Holt's death, the governor ordered all flags across North Dakota to fly at half-mast.

Party political offices
Preceded by Leslie R. Burgum	Democratic nominee for Lieutenant Governor of North Dakota; 1942	Succeeded by S. B. Hocking
Political offices
Preceded by Oscar W. Hagen	Lieutenant Governor of North Dakota; 1943–1944	Succeeded by Clarence P. Dahl
