= Jack A. Patterson =

American politician (1890–1971)

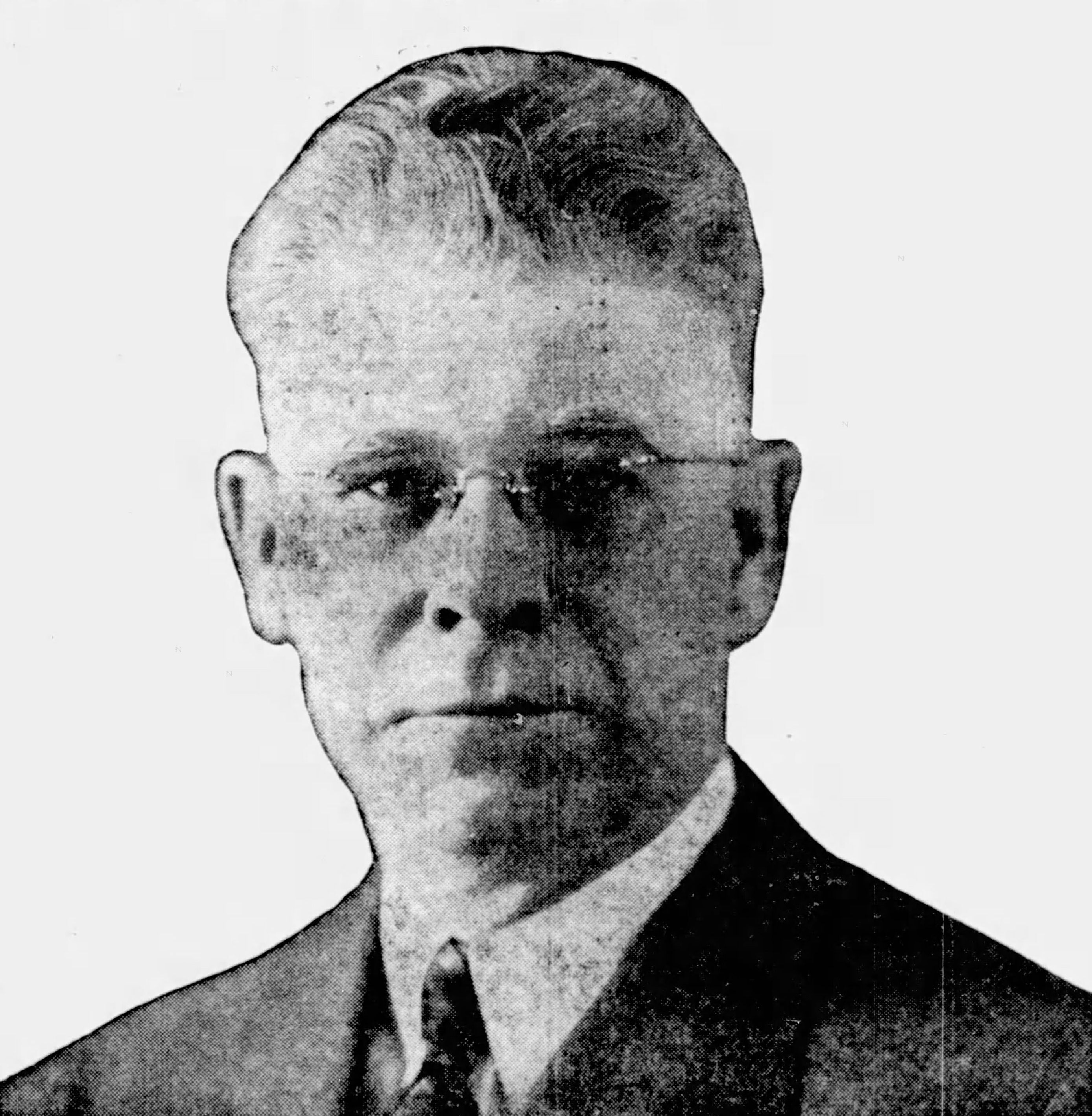
- Patterson c. 1940

19th Lieutenant Governor of North Dakota
- In office 1939–1941
- Governor: John Moses
- Preceded by: Thorstein H.H. Thoresen
- Succeeded by: Oscar W. Hagen

Member of the North Dakota House of Representatives
- In office 1933–1934

19th Mayor of Minot
- In office 1932–1938
- Preceded by: Winfield M. Smart
- Succeeded by: Victor E. Sandberg

Personal details
- Born: March 16, 1890 Sullivan, Illinois, U.S.
- Died: November 18, 1971 (aged 81) Mesa, Arizona, U.S.
- Party: Republican

Jack Albie Patterson (March 16, 1890 – November 18, 1971) was a North Dakota Republican Party politician who served as the 19th lieutenant governor of North Dakota from 1939 to 1941 serving under Governor John Moses. Patterson also served in the North Dakota House from 1933 to 1934.Patterson also served as the Mayor of Minot from 1932 to 1938. Patterson was originally from Illinois and came to Minot, North Dakota as a railroad telegrapher after serving overseas in World War I. He later retired to Arizona, where he died in 1971.

== Notes ==
Party political offices
Preceded by Thorstein H. H. Thoresen	Republican nominee for Lieutenant Governor of North Dakota; 1938	Succeeded by Oscar W. Hagen
Preceded by John N. Hagan	Republican nominee for Governor of North Dakota; 1940	Succeeded by Oscar W. Hagen
