= Milton Young =

American politician (1897–1983)

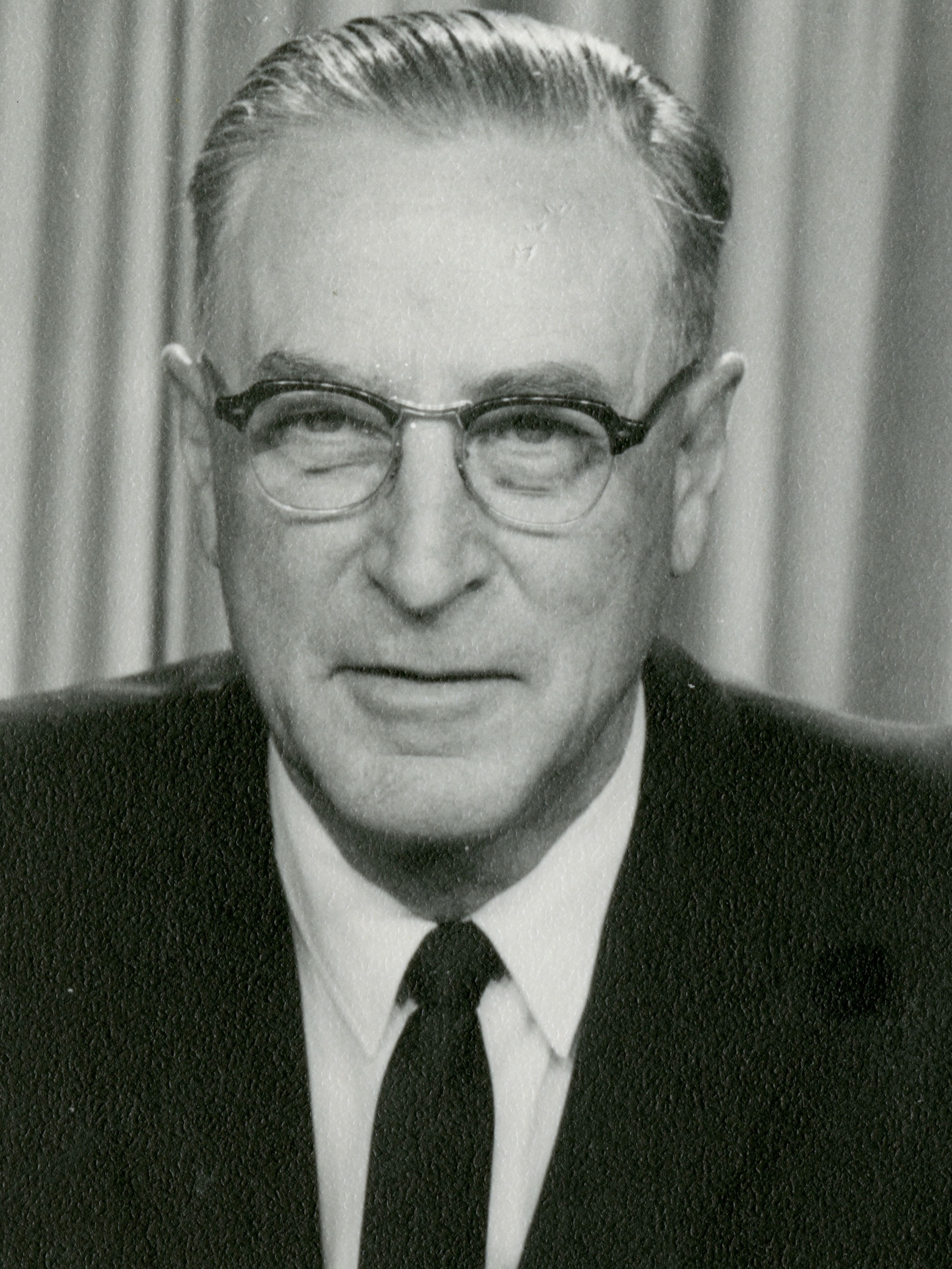

President pro tempore of the United States Senate
- In office December 5, 1980 – December 6, 1980
- Preceded by: Warren Magnuson
- Succeeded by: Warren Magnuson

Secretary of the Senate Republican Conference
- In office January 3, 1946 – January 3, 1971
- Leader: Wallace H. White; Kenneth S. Wherry; Styles Bridges; Robert A. Taft; William Knowland; Everett Dirksen; Hugh Scott
- Preceded by: John Chandler Gurney
- Succeeded by: Norris Cotton

United States Senator from North Dakota
- In office March 12, 1945 – January 3, 1981
- Preceded by: John Moses
- Succeeded by: Mark Andrews

Personal details
- Born: Milton Ruben Young; December 6, 1897 Berlin, North Dakota, U.S.
- Died: May 31, 1983 (aged 85) Sun City, Arizona, U.S.
- Resting place: Berlin Cemetery; Berlin, North Dakota
- Party: Republican
- Spouses: Malinda Benson (m. 1919; died 1969) Patricia Byrne (m. 1969)
- Education: North Dakota State University; Graceland University

Milton Ruben Young (December 6, 1897 – May 31, 1983) was an American politician, most notable for representing North Dakota in the United States Senate from 1945 until 1981. At the time of his retirement, he was the most senior Republican in the Senate, and the last member of the Lost Generation to serve in the Senate.

== Early life ==
Born at Berlin, North Dakota to John and Rachel Young, all four of his grandparents were from Germany. Young graduated from LaMoure High School, then attended North Dakota State University in Fargo and Graceland College. After college, Young returned home to operate the farm of his parents, John and Rachel Zimmerman Young. In 1919, Young married Malinda Benson and together they had three sons, Wendell, Duane, and John.

== Political career in North Dakota ==
Young became increasingly interested in politics during the depression and drought of the late 1920s and 1930s. He was active in community affairs, serving on the school, township, and county Agricultural Adjustment Act (AAA) boards. He stood for election to the North Dakota House of Representatives in 1932; he won, and was then elected to the state Senate just two years later. Young was also one of the key persons in developing the Republican Organizing Committee in North Dakota during the 1940s.

== Political career in Washington, D.C. ==
With the death of John Moses in 1945, Governor Fred G. Aandahl appointed Young to fill the vacant U.S. Senate seat, and Young was forced to relinquish management of the family farm, in order to fulfill his duties in Washington. For the 1952 Presidential election, Young initially indicated his support for Ohio Senator Robert Taft. In March, Young endorsed Democratic Senator Richard Russell Jr. for the presidency, citing him as "superbly qualified" for the position and stated his willingness to support him in the event that he was nominated by his party. The endorsement caused a sensation and left Republicans from his home state calling for his withdrawal from the party.

Young spent the remainder of his career in the Senate, becoming one of the longest-serving members of the Senate in its history. His major committee assignments were on the Agriculture, Nutrition, and Forestry committee, and the Appropriations committee of which he was the ranking Republican member. He was nicknamed "Mr. Wheat", and was instrumental in getting the Agricultural Act of 1956 and the Agriculture and Consumer Protection Act of 1973 passed. Despite his Republican affiliation, Young was praised by the Farmers Union for his support of farm policies. While supportive of Dwight D. Eisenhower as president, Young was critical of the farm policies of his Secretary of Agriculture, Ezra Taft Benson, who was praised by the far-right John Birch Society, an organization of which Young was also critical.

Young was also close friends with Senate Majority Leader and later President of the United States, Lyndon B. Johnson, calling him the President that was most close to "agriculture and rural America". Young voted in favor of the Civil Rights Acts of 1957, 1960, 1964, and 1968, as well as the Voting Rights Act of 1965 and the confirmation of Thurgood Marshall to the U.S. Supreme Court, but did not vote on the 24th Amendment to the U.S. Constitution. Despite voting against Medicare and Medicaid in 1965, Young co-sponsored health care bills that advocated for benefits and services similar to the Medicare program for people under 65 (as well as their spouses and children) through the Social Security Act, as well as a federally run health care program that would have replaced Medicaid. Young also voted in favor of the Comprehensive Child Development Act of 1971, which was vetoed by President Nixon, and the Equal Rights Amendment in 1972. When asked about a potential candidacy for his Senate seat from journalist Eric Sevareid in 1968, Young replied: "What does Sevareid know about wheat?" In 1974, during his last election for the U.S. Senate, Young's age was being used against him during the General election; Young aired campaign commercials showing himself breaking a piece of board with a karate chop and won re-election.

Young once said of his career in the Senate and loyalty to the people of his state: "I have always tried to stay close to the people. In North Dakota to be elected and to stay on, you have to know the farmers and stay close to them. They are loyal to a fault." As a result of the 1980 elections, Republicans won control of the Senate. As the longest-serving Republican Senator, Young would have been in line to become President pro tempore. However, he had chosen to retire instead of running for a seventh term. In deference to his long service in the body, he was elected President pro tempore by the lame duck Democratic-controlled Senate on December 5 and served for one day.

== Later personal life ==
Young's first wife died shortly before their golden anniversary in 1969. Young's second wife was Patricia Byrne, his secretary in the Senate, of Bowman, North Dakota. Young died at his retirement home in Sun City, Arizona on May 31, 1983, and was buried at Berlin, North Dakota. The Milton R. Young Power Plant in Oliver County was named in his honor. The tallest building in Minot is a public housing facility which bears his name (Milton Young Towers).

== See also ==
- 1956 United States Senate election in North Dakota
- 1962 United States Senate election in North Dakota
- 1968 United States Senate election in North Dakota
- 1974 United States Senate election in North Dakota

U.S. Senate
Preceded by John Moses	U.S. Senator (Class 3) from North Dakota; 1945–1981; Served alongside: William Langer, Clarence Norman Brunsdale, Quentin Burdick	Succeeded by Mark Andrews
Preceded by Leverett Saltonstall	Ranking Member of the Senate Appropriations Committee; 1967–1981	Succeeded by William Proxmire
Party political offices
Preceded by Gerald Nye	Republican nominee for U.S. Senator from North Dakota (Class 3); 1946, 1950, 1956, 1962, 1968, 1974	Succeeded by Mark Andrews
Preceded by John Chandler Gurney	Secretary of the Senate Republican Conference; 1946–1971	Succeeded by Norris Cotton
Honorary titles
Preceded by George Aiken	Most Senior Republican in the United States Senate; 1975–1981	Succeeded by Strom Thurmond
Preceded by John L. McClellan	Oldest United States Senator; 1977–1981	Succeeded by John C. Stennis
Political offices
Preceded by Warren G. Magnuson	President pro tempore of the U.S. Senate; 1980	Succeeded by Warren G. Magnuson
