= Milton R. Young Power Plant =

Coal-fired power plant in North Dakota

Coordinates: 47.066°N 101.214°W

Location in the United States
Location in North Dakota

Milton R. Young Station is a coal-fired power plant in the north central United States, located in Oliver County, North Dakota, southeast of Center. Northwest of Bismarck, it consists of two units which went into service in 1970 and 1977, and have generation capacities of 250 MW and 455 MW, respectively, for the Minnkota Power Cooperative. An abundant, low-cost coal supply from the nearby Center Mine, owned and operated by BNI Coal, has played a key role in the plant’s success.

The Young Station uses cooling water from Nelson Lake, a 2.5-mile-long, man-made reservoir created in 1968 with a 45-foot-high, earth-filled dam across Square Butte Creek. The 660-surface-acre lake provides water for cooling, boiler makeup and other station uses in the power production process. All water used in plant processes is tested and treated to confirm that its quality meets all standards for discharge. The lake is a popular spot with fishing and outdoor enthusiasts.

Both units at the Young Station are equipped with emission control technologies that meet or exceed all current state and federal air quality standards. Between 2006 and 2011, about $425 million was invested into the plant to significantly reduce emissions of sulfur dioxide (SO2), nitrogen oxides (NOx), mercury (Hg) and other emissions.

Milton Young (1897–1983) was a six-term U.S. Senator (1945–81) from the state.
