= Oscar W. Hagen =

American politician (1884–1945)

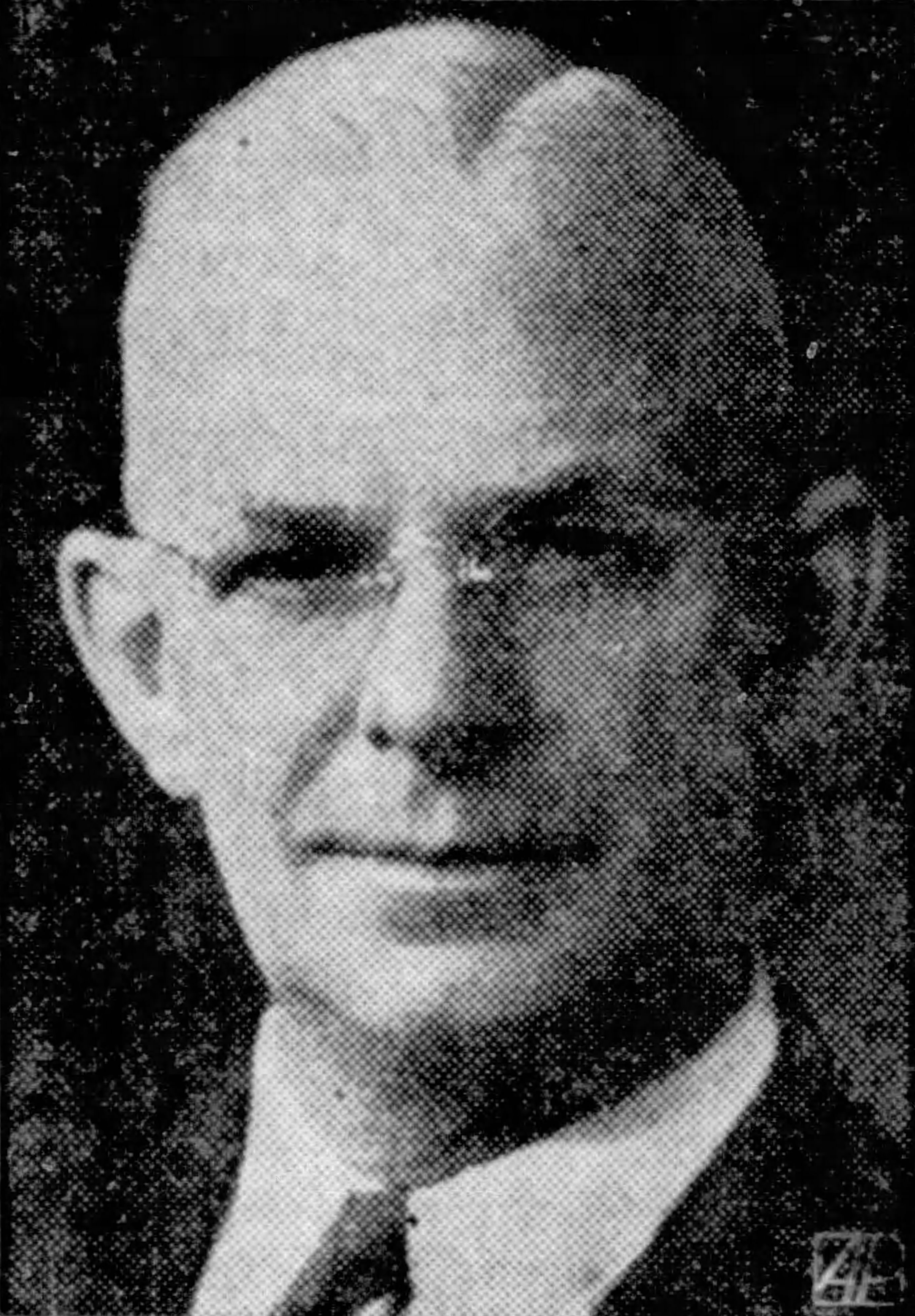
- Hagen c. 1942

20th Lieutenant Governor of North Dakota
- In office 1941–1943
- Governor: John Moses
- Preceded by: Jack A. Patterson
- Succeeded by: Henry Holt

Member of the North Dakota House of Representatives
- In office 1937–1940

Personal details
- Born: March 7, 1884 Walcott, North Dakota, U.S.
- Died: September 12, 1945 (aged 61)
- Party: Republican (NPL)

Oscar W. Hagen (March 7, 1884 – September 12, 1945) was a North Dakota Republican Party politician who served as the 20th lieutenant governor of North Dakota from 1941 to 1943 under Governor John Moses.

Hagen previously served in the North Dakota House from 1937 to 1940. He was the Republican nominee for governor in 1942. He died on September 12, 1945.

== Biography ==
Hagen was born in 1884 in Richland County, North Dakota.

Party political offices
Preceded by Jack A. Patterson	Republican nominee for Lieutenant Governor of North Dakota; 1940	Succeeded by Quentin Burdick
Preceded by Jack A. Patterson	Republican nominee for Governor of North Dakota; 1942	Succeeded by Fred G. Aandahl
Political offices
Preceded by Jack A. Patterson	Lieutenant Governor of North Dakota; 1941–1943	Succeeded by Henry Holt
