= 1950 North Dakota gubernatorial election =

- November 7, 1950
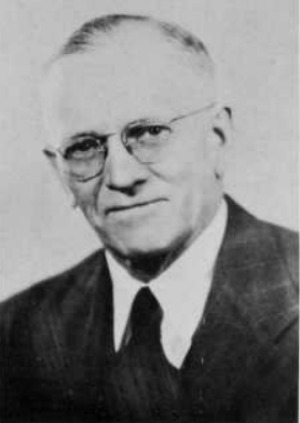

Nominee	Norman Brunsdale	Clyde G. Byerly
Party	Republican	Democratic
Popular vote	121,822	61,950
Percentage	66.29%	33.71%
- County results Brunsdale: 50–60% 60–70% 70–80% 80–90%
Governor before election
Fred G. Aandahl
Republican
Elected Governor
Norman Brunsdale
Republican

The 1950 North Dakota gubernatorial election was held on November 7, 1950. Republican nominee Norman Brunsdale defeated Democratic nominee Clyde G. Byerly with 66.29% of the vote.

== Primary elections ==
Primary elections were held on June 27, 1950.

=== Democratic primary ===
==== Candidates ====
- Clyde G. Byerly, former Mayor of Mandan
- Obed A. Wyum

==== Results ====
Democratic primary results
Party	Candidate	Votes	%
Democratic	Clyde G. Byerly	15,511	51.11
Democratic	Obed A. Wyum	14,836	48.89
Total votes		30,347	100.00

=== Republican primary ===
==== Candidates ====
- Norman Brunsdale, State Senator
- Frank Vogel, Manager of the Bank of North Dakota

==== Results ====
Republican primary results
Party	Candidate	Votes	%
Republican	Norman Brunsdale	81,599	59.04
Republican	Frank Vogel	56,612	40.96
Total votes		138,211	100.00

== General election ==
=== Candidates ===
- Norman Brunsdale, Republican
- Clyde G. Byerly, Democratic

=== Results ===
1950 North Dakota gubernatorial election
Party	Candidate	Votes	%	±%
Republican	Norman Brunsdale	121,822	66.29	▲4.96
Democratic	Clyde G. Byerly	61,950	33.71	▼3.78
Majority		59,872	32.58	▲8.80
Total votes		183,772	100.00	
Republican hold				
