= 1942 North Dakota gubernatorial election =

- November 3, 1942
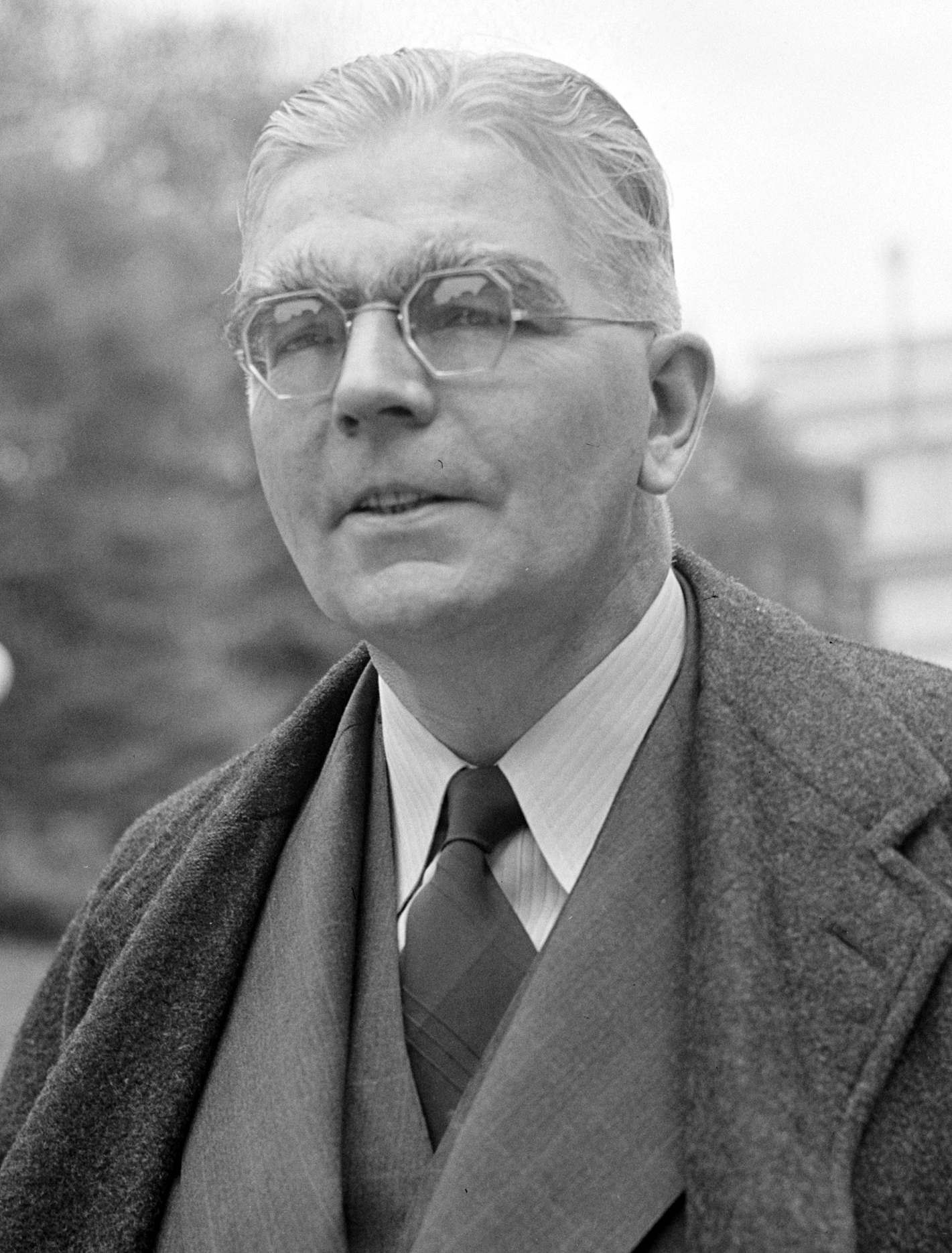

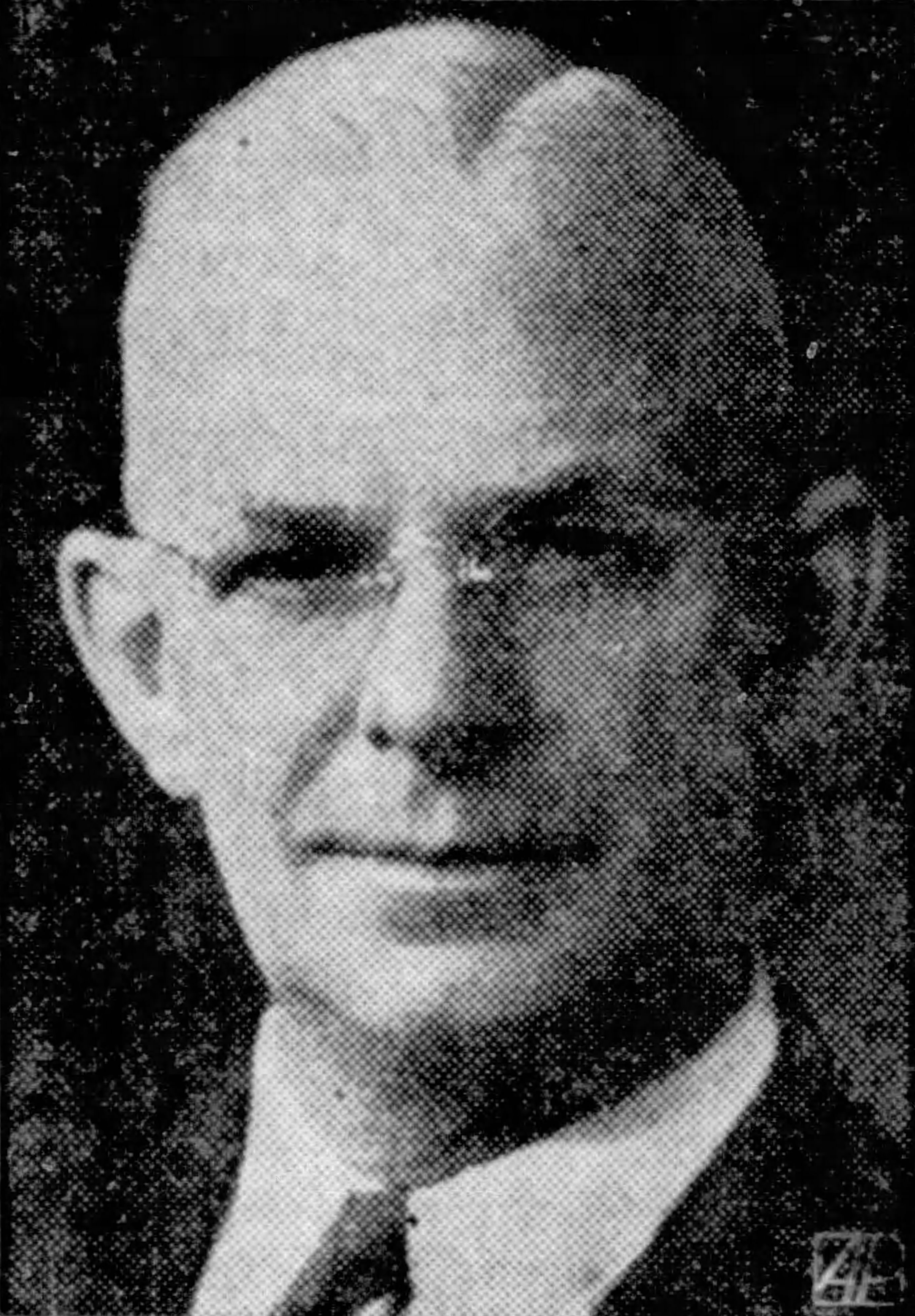
Nominee	John Moses	Oscar W. Hagen
Party	Democratic	Republican
Popular vote	101,390	74,577
Percentage	57.62%	42.38%
- County results Moses: 50–60% 60–70% 70–80% Hagen: 50–60% 60–70% 70–80%
Governor before election
John Moses
Democratic
Elected Governor
John Moses
Democratic

The 1942 North Dakota gubernatorial election was held on November 3, 1942. Incumbent Democrat John Moses defeated Republican nominee Oscar W. Hagen with 57.62% of the vote.

== Primary elections ==
Primary elections were held on June 30, 1942.

=== Democratic primary ===
==== Candidates ====
- John Moses, incumbent Governor

==== Results ====
Democratic primary results
Party	Candidate	Votes	%
Democratic	John Moses (inc.)	34,448	100.00
Total votes		34,448	100.00

=== Republican primary ===
==== Candidates ====
- Oscar W. Hagen, incumbent Lieutenant Governor
- Earl D. Symington, Speaker of the North Dakota House of Representatives

==== Results ====
Republican primary results
Party	Candidate	Votes	%
Republican	Oscar W. Hagen	66,529	65.99
Republican	Earl D. Symington	34,296	34.02
Total votes		100,825	100.00

== General election ==
=== Candidates ===
- John Moses, Democratic
- Oscar W. Hagen, Republican

=== Results ===
1942 North Dakota gubernatorial election
Party	Candidate	Votes	%	±%
Democratic	John Moses (inc.)	101,390	57.62	▼5.49
Republican	Oscar W. Hagen	74,577	42.38	▲5.49
Majority		26,813	15.24	▼10.98
Total votes		175,967	100.00	
Democratic hold				
