= 1948 North Dakota gubernatorial election =

Gubernatorial election in North Dakota

- November 2, 1948
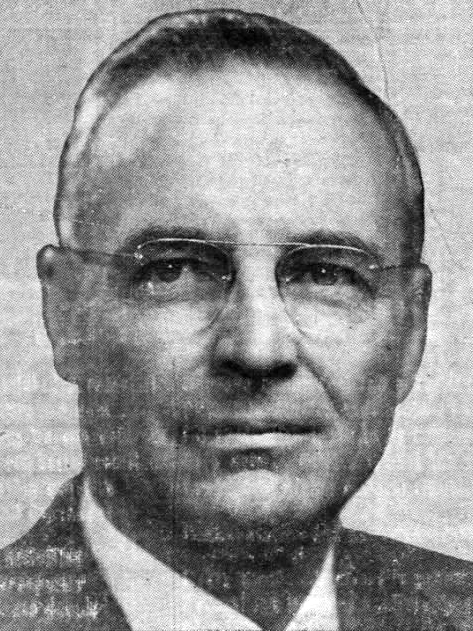

Nominee	Fred G. Aandahl	Howard I. Henry
Party	Republican	Democratic
Popular vote	131,764	80,555
Percentage	61.33%	37.49%
- County results Aandahl: 40–50% 50–60% 60–70% 70–80% 80–90% Henry: 50–60% 60–70% 70–80%
Governor before election
Fred G. Aandahl
Republican
Elected Governor
Fred G. Aandahl
Republican

The 1948 North Dakota gubernatorial election was held on November 2, 1948. Incumbent Republican Fred G. Aandahl defeated Democratic nominee Howard I. Henry with 61.33% of the vote.

== Primary elections ==
Primary elections were held on June 29, 1948.

=== Democratic primary ===
==== Candidates ====
- Howard I. Henry

==== Results ====
Democratic primary results
Party	Candidate	Votes	%
Democratic	Howard I. Henry	22,723	100.00
Total votes		22,723	100.00

=== Republican primary ===
==== Candidates ====
- Fred G. Aandahl, incumbent Governor
- Ervin Schumacher

==== Results ====
Republican primary results
Party	Candidate	Votes	%
Republican	Fred G. Aandahl (inc.)	93,924	53.19
Republican	Ervin Schumacher	82,657	46.81
Total votes		176,581	100.00

== General election ==
=== Candidates ===
Major party candidates

- Fred G. Aandahl, Republican
- Howard I. Henry, Democratic

Other candidates

- H. A. Porter, Progressive
- George Lund, Socialist

=== Results ===
1948 North Dakota gubernatorial election
Party	Candidate	Votes	%	±%
Republican	Fred G. Aandahl (inc.)	131,764	61.33	▼7.55
Democratic	Howard I. Henry	80,555	37.49	▲6.37
Progressive	H. A. Porter	1,873	0.87	N/A
Socialist	George Lund	666	0.31	N/A
Majority		51,109	23.78	▼13.97
Total votes		214,958	100.00	
Republican hold				
