= 1954 North Dakota gubernatorial election =

- November 2, 1954
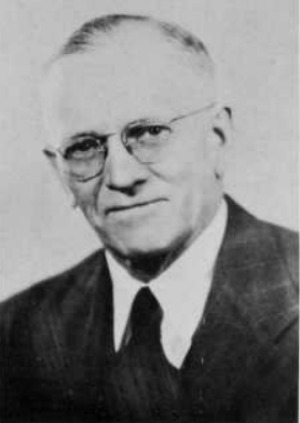

Nominee	Norman Brunsdale	Cornelius Bymers
Party	Republican	Democratic
Popular vote	124,253	69,248
Percentage	64.21%	35.79%
- County results Brunsdale: 50–60% 60–70% 70–80% 80–90%
Governor before election
Norman Brunsdale
Republican
Elected Governor
Norman Brunsdale
Republican

The 1954 North Dakota gubernatorial election was held on November 2, 1954. Incumbent Republican Norman Brunsdale defeated Democratic nominee Cornelius Bymers with 64.21% of the vote.

== Primary elections ==
Primary elections were held on June 29, 1954.

=== Democratic primary ===
==== Candidates ====
- Cornelius Bymers, State Representative

==== Results ====
Democratic primary results
Party	Candidate	Votes	%
Democratic	Cornelius Bymers	14,638	100.00
Total votes		14,638	100.00

=== Republican primary ===
==== Candidates ====
- Norman Brunsdale, incumbent Governor
- Wallace E. Warner, former North Dakota Attorney General

==== Results ====
Republican primary results
Party	Candidate	Votes	%
Republican	Norman Brunsdale (inc.)	77,890	53.82
Republican	Wallace E. Warner	66,839	46.18
Total votes		144,729	100.00

== General election ==
=== Candidates ===
- Norman Brunsdale, Republican
- Cornelius Bymers, Democratic

=== Results ===
1954 North Dakota gubernatorial election
Party	Candidate	Votes	%	±%
Republican	Norman Brunsdale (inc.)	124,253	64.21	▼14.53
Democratic	Cornelius Bymers	69,248	35.79	▲14.53
Majority		55,005	28.43	▼29.05
Total votes		193,501	100.00	
Republican hold				
