= 1954 California gubernatorial election =

- November 2, 1954
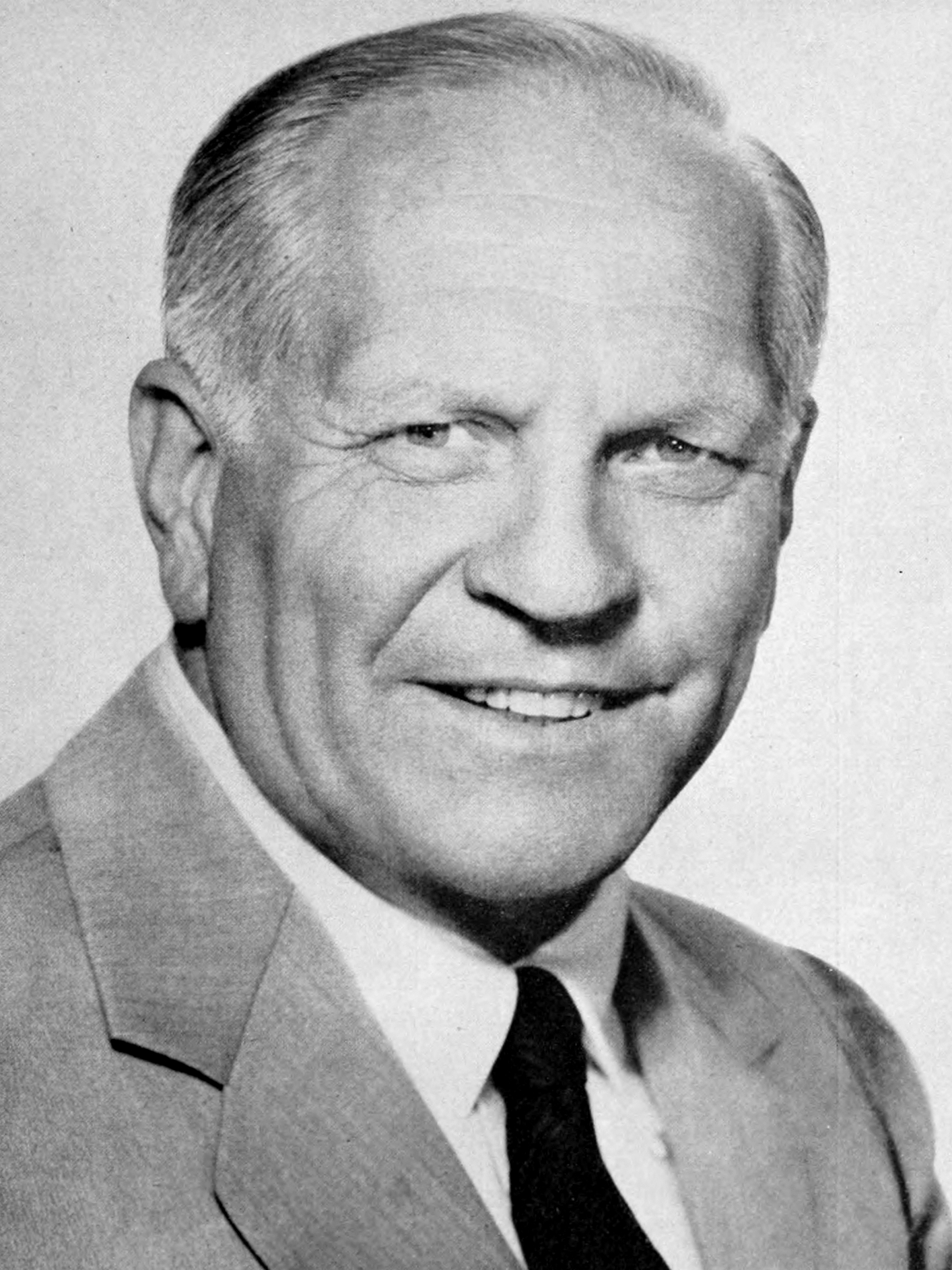

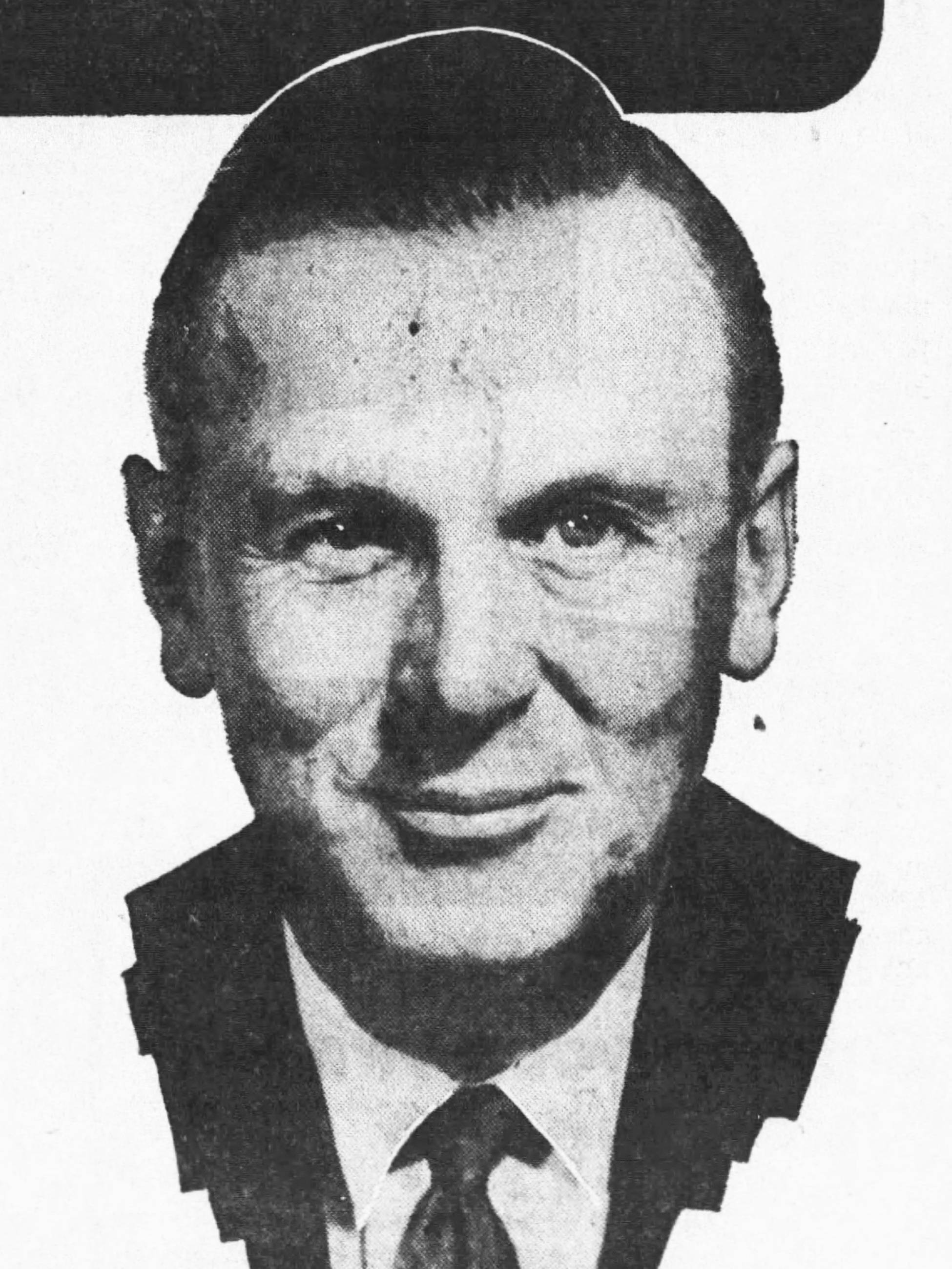
Nominee	Goodwin Knight	Richard Graves
Party	Republican	Democratic
Popular vote	2,290,519	1,739,368
Percentage	56.83%	43.16%
- County results Knight: 50–60% 60–70% 70–80% 80–90% Graves: 50–60%
Governor before election
Goodwin Knight
Republican
Elected Governor
Goodwin Knight
Republican

The 1954 California gubernatorial election was held on November 2, 1954. Incumbent Republican governor Goodwin Knight, who had ascended to the office after Earl Warren resigned to become Chief Justice of the United States the previous year, won a full term against Democrat Richard Graves.

Graves was the first Democratic nominee for governor to carry Yolo County since 1910; since 1954 it has been won by the Democratic nominee in all but three (Note: 1966, 1986, and 2006) elections. Knight remains the last Republican gubernatorial nominee to date to carry San Francisco.

== Primary elections ==
Primary elections were held on June 8, 1954.

=== Democratic primary ===
==== Candidates ====
- Richard P. Graves, former director of the League of California Cities
- Goodwin J. Knight, incumbent Governor (cross-filing)
- Roderick J. Wilson

==== Results ====
Democratic primary results
Party	Candidate	Votes	%
Democratic	Richard P. Graves	860,846	50.62%
Republican	Goodwin J. Knight	718,695	42.26%
Democratic	Roderick J. Wilson	121,212	7.13%
Total votes		1,700,753	100.00%

=== Republican primary ===
==== Candidates ====
- Cornell L. Gabrish
- Richard P. Graves, former director of the League of California Cities (cross-filing)
- Goodwin J. Knight, incumbent Governor

==== Results ====
Republican primary results
Party	Candidate	Votes	%
Republican	Goodwin J. Knight	1,198,896	89.61%
Democratic	Richard P. Graves	112,919	8.44%
Republican	Cornell L. Gabrish	26,084	1.95%
Total votes		1,337,899	100.00%

=== Independent–Progressive primary ===
==== Candidates ====
- Cornell L. Galbrish (cross-filing)

==== Results ====
Independent–Progressive primary results
Party	Candidate	Votes	%
Republican	Cornell L. Galbrish	1,896	100.00%
Total votes		1,896	100.00%

Galbrish was disqualified from the general election as he had not won his own party's nomination.

== General election results ==
1954 California gubernatorial election
Party	Candidate	Votes	%	±%
Republican	Goodwin J. Knight (incumbent)	2,290,519	56.83%	−8.02%
Democratic	Richard P. Graves	1,739,368	43.16%	+8.02%
	Scattering	481	0.01%	
Majority		551,151	13.67%	
Total votes		4,030,368	100.00%	
Republican hold		Swing	-16.04%	

=== Results by county ===
County	Goodwin J. Knight Republican		Richard P. Graves Democratic		Scattering Write-in		Margin		Total votes cast
County	#	%	#	%	#	%	#	%	Total votes cast
Alameda	143,007	49.93%	143,350	50.05%	52	0.02%	-343	-0.12%	286,409
Alpine	110	80.88%	26	19.12%	0	0.00%	84	61.76%	136
Amador	1,964	45.86%	2,319	54.14%	0	0.00%	-355	-8.29%	4,283
Butte	14,390	58.92%	10,035	41.08%	0	0.00%	4,355	17.83%	24,425
Calaveras	2,574	53.64%	2,225	46.36%	0	0.00%	349	7.27%	4,799
Colusa	2,337	57.76%	1,709	42.24%	0	0.00%	628	15.52%	4,046
Contra Costa	58,340	51.61%	54,681	48.37%	15	0.01%	3,659	3.24%	113,036
Del Norte	2,584	64.86%	1,400	35.14%	0	0.00%	1,184	29.72%	3,984
El Dorado	3,968	54.87%	3,264	45.13%	0	0.00%	704	9.73%	7,232
Fresno	44,581	49.12%	46,168	50.87%	2	0.00%	-1,587	-1.75%	90,751
Glenn	3,197	57.45%	2,368	42.55%	0	0.00%	829	14.90%	5,565
Humboldt	16,324	63.39%	9,426	36.61%	0	0.00%	6,898	26.79%	25,750
Imperial	7,664	58.25%	5,494	41.75%	0	0.00%	2,170	16.49%	13,158
Inyo	2,662	66.45%	1,344	33.55%	0	0.00%	1,318	32.90%	4,006
Kern	35,301	51.69%	32,997	48.31%	1	0.00%	2,304	3.37%	68,299
Kings	5,070	42.75%	6,789	57.25%	0	0.00%	-1,719	-14.50%	11,859
Lake	3,409	64.98%	1,837	35.02%	0	0.00%	1,572	29.97%	5,246
Lassen	2,597	45.30%	3,136	54.70%	0	0.00%	-539	-9.40%	5,733
Los Angeles	950,611	57.31%	707,734	42.67%	303	0.02%	242,877	14.64%	1,658,648
Madera	5,147	46.94%	5,817	53.06%	0	0.00%	-670	-6.11%	10,964
Marin	23,830	64.01%	13,392	35.97%	4	0.01%	10,438	28.04%	37,226
Mariposa	1,405	60.80%	906	39.20%	0	0.00%	499	21.59%	2,311
Mendocino	9,146	59.94%	6,111	40.05%	1	0.01%	3,035	19.89%	15,258
Merced	9,924	48.46%	10,553	51.53%	1	0.00%	-629	-3.07%	20,478
Modoc	1,763	54.70%	1,460	45.30%	0	0.00%	303	9.40%	3,223
Mono	602	76.20%	188	23.80%	0	0.00%	414	52.41%	790
Monterey	22,593	59.45%	15,411	40.55%	2	0.01%	7,182	18.90%	38,006
Napa	10,992	60.59%	7,149	39.41%	0	0.00%	3,843	21.18%	18,141
Nevada	4,376	57.13%	3,284	42.87%	0	0.00%	1,092	14.26%	7,660
Orange	63,148	69.65%	27,511	30.34%	7	0.01%	35,637	39.31%	90,666
Placer	7,459	46.97%	8,420	53.03%	0	0.00%	-961	-6.05%	15,879
Plumas	2,053	43.50%	2,667	56.50%	0	0.00%	-614	-13.01%	4,720
Riverside	39,047	63.22%	22,706	36.77%	6	0.01%	16,341	26.46%	61,759
Sacramento	55,277	49.61%	56,137	50.38%	12	0.01%	-860	-0.77%	111,426
San Benito	2,911	64.86%	1,577	35.14%	0	0.00%	1,334	29.72%	4,488
San Bernardino	60,417	58.39%	43,058	41.61%	5	0.00%	17,359	16.78%	103,480
San Diego	139,769	64.23%	77,817	35.76%	6	0.00%	61,952	28.47%	217,592
San Francisco	151,458	55.97%	119,138	44.03%	13	0.00%	32,320	11.94%	270,609
San Joaquin	36,111	55.99%	28,384	44.01%	6	0.01%	7,727	11.98%	64,501
San Luis Obispo	12,808	58.34%	9,145	41.65%	2	0.01%	3,663	16.68%	21,955
San Mateo	71,440	63.02%	41,910	36.97%	13	0.01%	29,530	26.05%	113,363
Santa Barbara	23,368	62.63%	13,941	37.36%	2	0.01%	9,427	25.27%	37,311
Santa Clara	72,695	58.25%	52,088	41.74%	9	0.01%	20,607	16.51%	124,792
Santa Cruz	19,008	64.17%	10,613	35.83%	1	0.00%	8,395	28.34%	29,622
Shasta	6,582	44.69%	8,144	55.30%	1	0.01%	-1,560	-10.61%	14,727
Sierra	579	49.15%	599	50.85%	0	0.00%	-20	-1.70%	1,178
Siskiyou	6,019	52.72%	5,397	47.28%	0	0.00%	622	5.45%	11,416
Solano	16,537	48.87%	17,303	51.13%	0	0.00%	-766	-2.26%	33,840
Sonoma	26,766	64.55%	14,699	35.45%	3	0.01%	12,067	29.10%	41,468
Stanislaus	21,487	50.77%	20,828	49.22%	4	0.01%	659	1.56%	42,319
Sutter	4,704	58.15%	3,386	41.85%	0	0.00%	1,318	16.29%	8,090
Tehama	4,566	59.20%	3,147	40.80%	0	0.00%	1,419	18.40%	7,713
Trinity	1,137	49.16%	1,176	50.84%	0	0.00%	-39	-1.69%	2,313
Tulare	21,491	54.64%	17,842	45.36%	1	0.00%	3,649	9.28%	39,334
Tuolumne	2,773	47.60%	3,053	52.40%	0	0.00%	-280	-4.81%	5,826
Ventura	19,926	53.33%	17,434	46.66%	4	0.01%	2,492	6.67%	37,364
Yolo	7,053	49.77%	7,114	50.20%	5	0.04%	-61	-0.43%	14,172
Yuba	3,462	49.30%	3,561	50.70%	0	0.00%	-99	-1.41%	7,023
Total	2,290,519	56.83%	1,739,368	43.16%	481	0.01%	551,151	13.67%	4,030,368

=== Counties that flipped from Republican to Democratic ===
- Alameda
- Amador
- Fresno
- Kings
- Lassen
- Madera
- Merced
- Placer
- Plumas
- Sacramento
- Shasta
- Sierra
- Solano
- Trinity
- Tuolumne
- Yolo
- Yuba

== Bibliography ==
- Barclay, Thomas S. (December 1954). "The 1954 Election in California". The Western Political Quarterly. 7 (4). University of Utah on behalf of the Western Political Science Association: 597–604. doi:10.2307/442809. JSTOR 442809.
