= Norman Brunsdale =

American politician

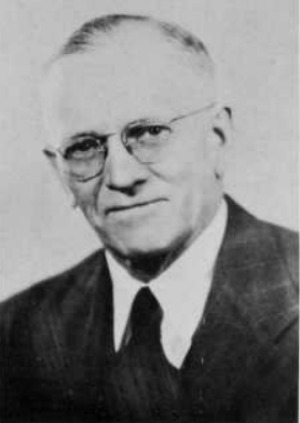
- Official portrait, c. 1955

United States Senator from North Dakota
- In office November 19, 1959 – August 7, 1960
- Appointed by: John E. Davis
- Preceded by: William Langer
- Succeeded by: Quentin Burdick

24th Governor of North Dakota
- In office January 3, 1951 – January 9, 1957
- Lieutenant: Ray Schnell; Clarence P. Dahl
- Preceded by: Fred G. Aandahl
- Succeeded by: John E. Davis

Member of the North Dakota Senate
- In office 1927–1935; 1940–1951

Personal details
- Born: Clarence Norman Brunsdale; July 9, 1891 Sherbrooke, North Dakota
- Died: January 27, 1978 (aged 86) Mayville, North Dakota
- Party: Republican

Clarence Norman Brunsdale (July 9, 1891 – January 27, 1978) was an American politician who served as the 24th governor of North Dakota and a United States senator from the state of North Dakota.

== Biography ==
Clarence Norman Brunsdale was born in Sherbrooke, Steele County, North Dakota. He was the son of Knute H. Brunsdale (1855–1899) and Anna Margaret (Nordgaard) Brunsdale (1860–1927), both of whom were of Norwegian immigrant heritage. He was educated in public schools and the Bruflat Academy at Portland, North Dakota. In 1913, he graduated from Luther College in Decorah, Iowa. He returned to Portland, teaching at Bruflat Academy and worked the family farm operations in Traill and Steele counties.

== Career ==
Brunsdale served in the North Dakota State Senate (1927–34, 1941–51). He was an alternate delegate to Republican National Convention from North Dakota (1940) and a member of Republican National Committee from North Dakota, (1948–52). He was Governor of North Dakota from 1951 to 1957 and U.S. Senator from November 19, 1959, to August 7, 1960. As governor, Brunsdale was an avid supporter of water development projects. During his administration Garrison Dam was completed and the Legislature established the Garrison Diversion Conservancy District. The early 1950s also saw the establishment of the Highway Department and the passage of major highway legislation. Education, agriculture, and mental health issues were also important to Governor Brunsdale. In 1959, Brunsdale was appointed to the United States Senate upon the death of Senator William Langer. Brunsdale voted in favor of the Civil Rights Act of 1960. Brunsdale was not a candidate for election to the vacancy and Quentin Burdick was narrowly elected to the seat in a 1960 special election.

== Personal life ==
He was married to Carrie Lajord (1890–1982) on August 30, 1925, and they had two daughters, Margaret Marie (Larson) and Helen Lucille (Williams). Brunsdale died at Mayville, North Dakota in 1978. He was buried in Mayville Cemetery, Mayville, Traill County, North Dakota. Brunsdale was a Lutheran.

Party political offices
Preceded by Fred G. Aandahl	Republican nominee for Governor of North Dakota; 1950, 1952, 1954	Succeeded by John E. Davis
Political offices
Preceded by Fred G. Aandahl	Governor of North Dakota; 1951–1957	Succeeded by John E. Davis
U.S. Senate
Preceded by William Langer	U.S. senator (Class 1) from North Dakota; 1959–1960; Served alongside: Milton Young	Succeeded by Quentin N. Burdick
