= John E. Davis (North Dakota politician) =

American politician

John Davis
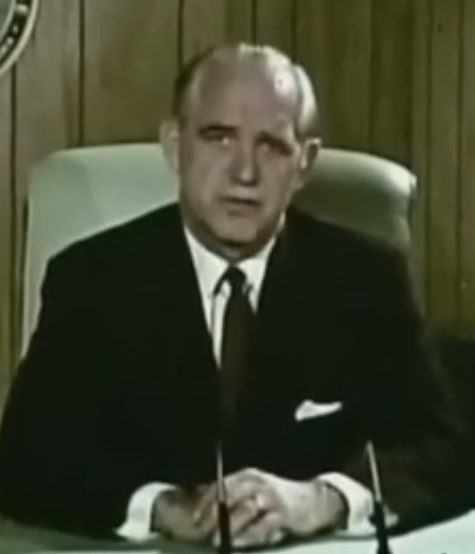

Director of the Defense Civil Preparedness Agency
- In office May 5, 1972 – January 20, 1977
- President: Richard Nixon; Gerald Ford
- Preceded by: Position established
- Succeeded by: Bardyl Tirana

Director of the Office of Civil Defense
- In office May 20, 1969 – May 5, 1972
- President: Richard Nixon
- Preceded by: Joseph Romm
- Succeeded by: Position abolished

National Commander of the American Legion
- In office 1966–1967
- Preceded by: Eldon James
- Succeeded by: William E. Galbraith

25th Governor of North Dakota
- In office January 9, 1957 – January 4, 1961
- Lieutenant: Francis Duffy; Clarence P. Dahl
- Preceded by: Norman Brunsdale
- Succeeded by: William L. Guy

Personal details
- Born: John Edward Davis; April 18, 1913 Minneapolis, Minnesota, U.S.
- Died: May 12, 1990 (aged 77) Rancho Mirage, California, U.S.
- Party: Republican
- Spouses: Pauline Huntley (m. 1938; div. 1978); Marilyn Westlie (m. 1980–1990)
- Children: 3
- Education: University of North Dakota (BS)

Military service
- Allegiance: United States
- Branch/service: United States Army
- Years of service: 1935–1945
- Rank: Lieutenant Colonel
- Commands: 1st Battalion, 134th Infantry
- Battles/wars: World War II • Invasion of Normandy • Operation Overlord • Allied advance from Paris to the Rhine • Battle of the Bulge • Western Allied invasion of Germany
- Awards: Silver Star; Bronze Star Medal; Purple Heart

John Edward Davis (April 18, 1913 – May 12, 1990) was an American politician who served as Director of the Defense Civil Preparedness Agency from 1969 to 1976. He also previously served as the National Commander of The American Legion, from 1966 to 1967, and as the 25th governor of North Dakota from 1957 to 1961.

== Early life ==
Davis was born in Minneapolis. After attending several years of high school in Fargo, he graduated from Bismarck High School in 1931. Later that fall, he enrolled at the University of North Dakota in Grand Forks. While at the university, he pledged for Beta Theta Pi, and was active in the Reserve Officers' Training Corps (ROTC). He was the ranking officer in Scabbard and Blade, an organization of select senior ROTC cadet officers. Davis graduated with a Bachelor of Science in Commerce in 1935 and was commissioned a second lieutenant in the Officers Reserve Corps. He returned to Goodrich and took over management of his family's ranch and farm. Davis was married to Pauline Huntley in 1938, and they had three children; John Jr., Richard, and Kathleen. The couple divorced after forty years of marriage in 1978, after which he married Marilyn R. Westlie in 1980.

== World War II ==
In May 1941, Davis was ordered to active duty and reported first to Fort Snelling, Minnesota, before being sent to Camp Joseph T. Robinson, Arkansas, where he later became commander of Company C, 1st Battalion, 134th Infantry, 35th Infantry Division. He saw extensive combat duty in the European Theater as commander of Company C, and later as the commander of the 1st Battalion, 134th Infantry Regiment, and received the Silver Star Medal, the Bronze Star Medal, and the Purple Heart. He was discharged from the United States Army on July 31, 1945, at Camp McCoy, Wisconsin.

== Political career ==
In 1946, Davis was elected mayor of McClusky, North Dakota, serving until 1952. That year, he successfully ran for a position in the North Dakota State Senate. He served in the Senate until 1956, when he was nominated for Governor on the Republican ticket. He defeated the Democratic candidate, Wally Warner, in the fall election. He was re-elected in 1958, defeating the Democratic candidate, John F. Lord, and served until 1960. He was a candidate for the United States Senate in 1960, but was narrowly defeated by Quentin N. Burdick. He was again a candidate in 1964, but lost the Republican primary to Tom Kleppe. In 1966, Davis was honored with the Sioux Award, the University of North Dakota Alumni Association's highest honor. Davis was elected The American Legion National Commander from 1966 to 1967, and was appointed Director of the Office of Civil Defense by President Richard Nixon in 1969. The agency was renamed in 1972 as the Defense Civil Preparedness Agency. Following his retirement in 1976, he was awarded the Department of Defense Service Medal.

== Later life ==
In 1977, Davis returned to North Dakota to operate the family ranch and resume presidency of the First National Bank of McClusky. In 1978, he received the Greater North Dakota Award from the Greater North Dakota Association. Davis was active in many non-profit organizations, including the Elks, Masons, and the Scottish Rite and the Shrine. He died on May 12, 1990, in Rancho Mirage, California. He is buried in Fairview Cemetery, Bismarck, North Dakota.

== See also ==
- North Dakota's United States Senate special election, 1960

Party political offices
Preceded by Norman Brunsdale	Republican nominee for Governor of North Dakota; 1956, 1958	Succeeded by Clarence P. Dahl
Preceded by William Langer	Republican nominee for U.S. Senator from North Dakota (Class 1); 1960	Succeeded by Thomas S. Kleppe
Political offices
Preceded by Norman Brunsdale	Governor of North Dakota; 1957–1961	Succeeded by William L. Guy
Preceded by Joseph Romm	Director of the Office of Civil Defense; 1969–1972	Position abolished
New office	Director of the Defense Civil Preparedness Agency; 1972–1977	Succeeded by Bardyl Tirana
Non-profit organization positions
Preceded by Eldon James	National Commander of the American Legion; 1966–1967	Succeeded by William E. Galbraith
