= Richard P. Graves =

American businessman

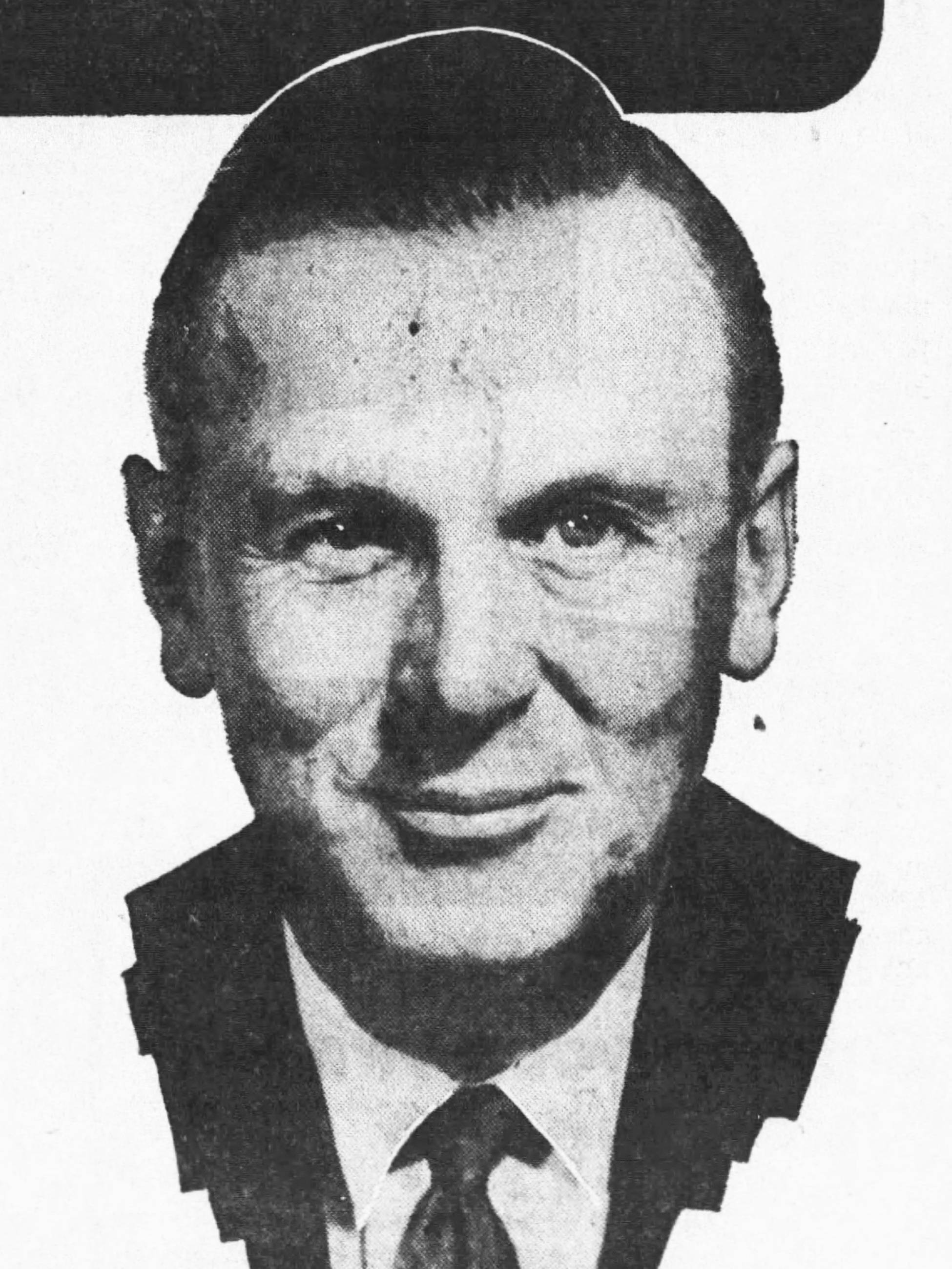
Graves in 1954

Richard Perrin Graves (October 15, 1906 – June 6, 1989) was an American politician and real estate executive.

== Education and career ==
Born in Philadelphia, Pennsylvania, in 1906, Graves graduated in 1931 from the University of California, Berkeley, with a master's degree in public administration. In 1933, he became executive director of the League of California Cities, a position he held until 1953.

In 1954, he was the unsuccessful Democratic nominee for Governor of California against Republican incumbent Goodwin J. Knight. His campaign manager was Pierre Salinger, who later served as press secretary to President John F. Kennedy. The friendship with Salinger apparently continued; Graves rode on Air Force One with JFK in December 1961.

Graves later returned to his native Philadelphia, where he organized the Philadelphia Industrial Development Corporation, a quasi-official group that aimed to keep industry from leaving the state. Later, he became a real estate developer, helping guide a 500-acre industrial park in Philadelphia to completion. Graves moved back to Los Angeles in 1965, continuing his real estate career with the Tishman Realty and Construction Company and later with Conrad Associates; he retired in 1983 and moved to Northern California.

== Death ==
Graves died at his home in Pebble Beach, California in 1989 at age 82.

Party political offices
Preceded by James Roosevelt	Democratic nominee for Governor of California; 1954	Succeeded by Pat Brown
