= John Moses (North Dakota politician) =

American politician

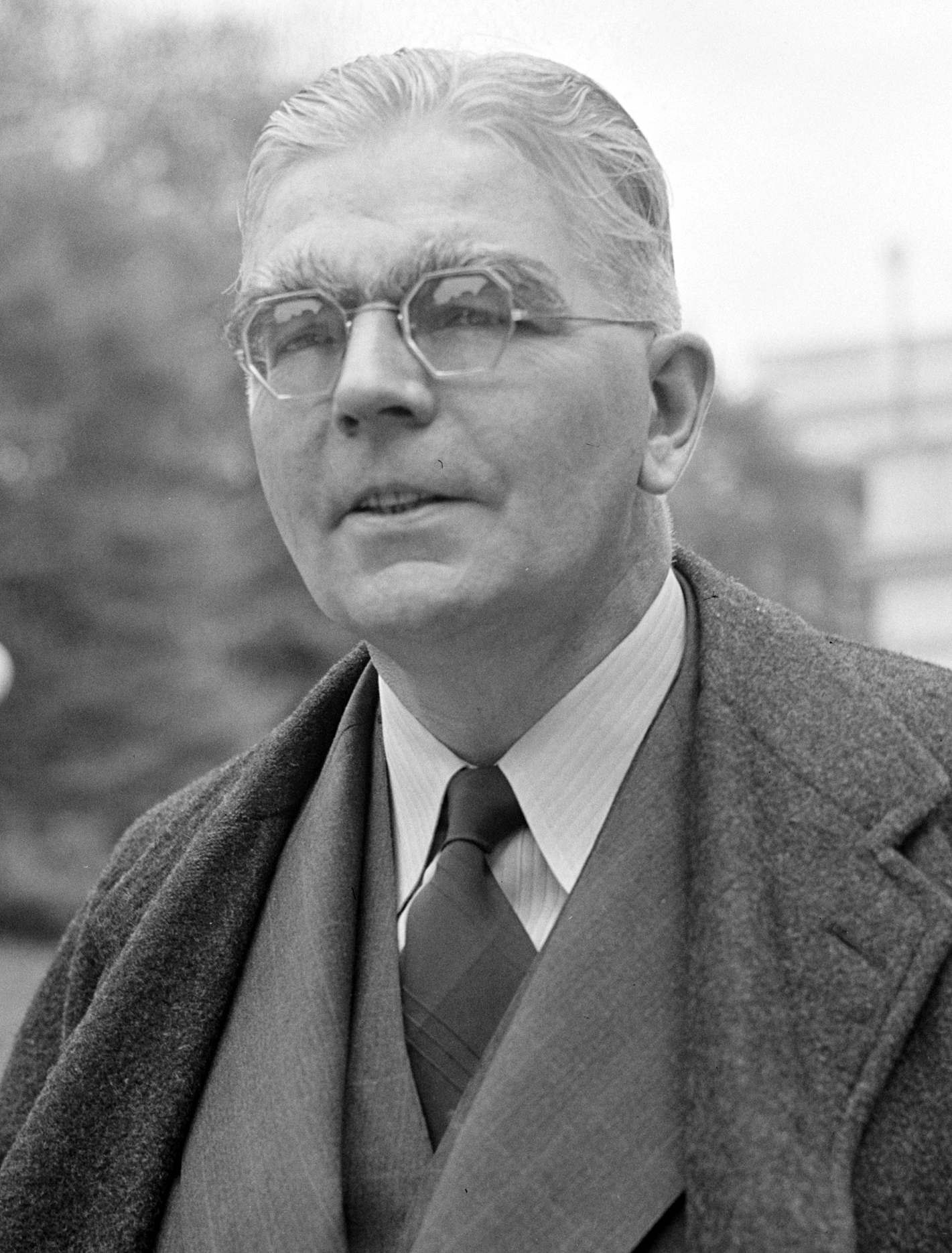
- Moses in 1939

United States Senator from North Dakota
- In office January 3, 1945 – March 3, 1945
- Preceded by: Gerald Nye
- Succeeded by: Milton Young

22nd Governor of North Dakota
- In office January 5, 1939 – January 4, 1945
- Lieutenant: Jack A. Patterson; Oscar W. Hagen; Henry Holt; Clarence P. Dahl
- Preceded by: William Langer
- Succeeded by: Fred G. Aandahl

Personal details
- Born: June 12, 1885 Strand, Norway
- Died: March 3, 1945 (aged 59) Rochester, Minnesota, U.S.
- Party: Democratic
- Education: University of North Dakota (BA, JD)

John Moses (June 12, 1885 – March 3, 1945) was the 22nd governor of North Dakota from 1939 to 1945, and served in the United States Senate in 1945 until his death that year. Excluding those appointed to fill brief vacancies, and those not seated at the beginning of their lawful terms, Moses is the shortest-serving U.S. senator ever, in office for just 59 days.

== Early life ==
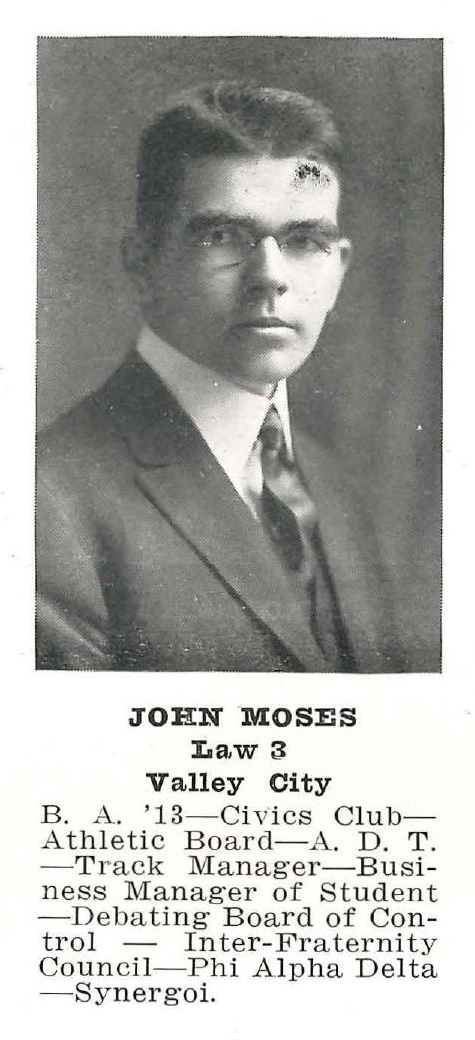
Moses in the University of North Dakota yearbook, 1916

Moses was born in Strand in Rogaland county, Norway in 1885. He was the son of Reverend Henrik B. and Isabella (Eckersberg) Moses. He attended public school in Norway, and graduated from the high school at Kongsvinger in 1900 and from junior college in Oslo in 1903. He came to the United States in 1905 and worked for the Great Northern Railway from 1906 to 1911. He entered the University of North Dakota in 1912, and graduated with a Bachelor of Arts in 1914. He entered the University of North Dakota Law School and graduated with a Juris Doctor degree in 1915. He began practicing law at Hazen, North Dakota in 1917. He was married to Ethel Joslyn and had four children.

== Political career ==
From 1919 until 1923, and later from 1927 until 1933, Moses served as State's Attorney for Mercer County. In 1936 he came in third in the three-way governor's race, behind former governor William Langer and incumbent governor Walter Welford (both Republicans). Moses became governor in 1939, following William Langer's second term in the office. Moses worked hard to reduce Langer's influence. He sought to cut government spending and to balance the state's budget. Moses was in office during World War II. He tried to encourage war-time industries to locate in the state, but North Dakota ranked last in the nation for receiving war spending. Despite the lack of wartime appropriations, Moses' administration was a time of prosperity for the state. Rainfall was plentiful and there was a ready market for agriculture products. Moses was a popular governor. During his election campaign he gave speeches in English, German, or Norwegian, depending on his audience. A Democrat, Moses was noted for his support from both political parties. In 1944 Moses defeated Gerald P. Nye for a seat in the United States Senate.

== Death ==
Moses died on March 3, 1945 of pleurisy, shortly after taking his place in the Senate. He is buried in St. Mary's Cemetery, Bismarck, North Dakota.

== See also ==
- List of members of the United States Congress who died in office (1900–1949)
- List of United States governors born outside the United States
- List of United States senators born outside the United States

Party political offices
Preceded by Scott Cameron	Democratic nominee for North Dakota Attorney General; 1934	Succeeded by William T. Depuy
Preceded by Thomas H. Moodie	Democratic nominee for Governor of North Dakota; 1936, 1938, 1940, 1942	Succeeded by William T. DePuy
Preceded by J. J. Nygard	Democratic nominee for U.S. Senator from North Dakota (Class 3); 1944	Succeeded by William Lanier
Political offices
Preceded by William Langer	Governor of North Dakota; 1939–1945	Succeeded by Fred G. Aandahl
U.S. Senate
Preceded by Gerald P. Nye	U.S. senator (Class 3) from North Dakota; 1945; Served alongside: William Langer	Succeeded by Milton R. Young
