= Duane Mutch =

American politician (1925–2019)

Member of the North Dakota Senate from the 19th district
- In office 1959–1976
- In office 1979–2006

Personal details
- Born: May 13, 1925 near Kempton, North Dakota
- Died: July 17, 2019 (aged 94) Larimore, North Dakota
- Party: Republican
- Spouse: Dolores
- Profession: Bulk oil and propane distributor

Duane Ollen Mutch (May 13, 1925 – July 17, 2019) was an American politician who was a member of the North Dakota State Senate. He served from 1959 to 1976 and 1979–2006. The son of Floyd (1895-1941) and Leona (1897-1986) Mutch, he was a bulk oil and propane distributor and infantry veteran of World War II (serving under George S. Patton). He died on July 17, 2019.
