= Fred G. Aandahl =

American politician (1897–1966)

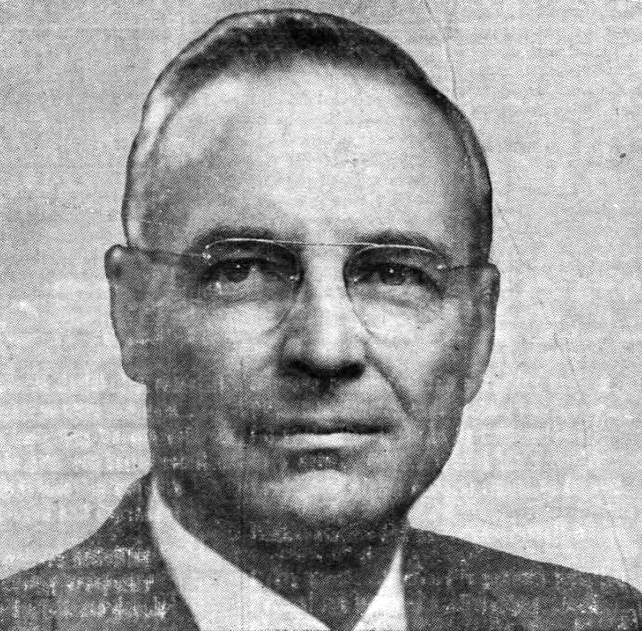
- Aandahl in 1952

Member of the U.S. House of Representatives from North Dakota's at-large district
- In office January 3, 1951 – January 3, 1953
- Preceded by: William Lemke
- Succeeded by: Otto Krueger

23rd Governor of North Dakota
- In office January 4, 1945 – January 3, 1951
- Lieutenant: Clarence P. Dahl
- Preceded by: John Moses
- Succeeded by: Norman Brunsdale

Member of the North Dakota State Senate
- In office 1941
- In office 1939
- In office 1931

Personal details
- Born: Fred George Aandahl; April 9, 1897 Svea Township, Barnes County, North Dakota, U.S.
- Died: April 7, 1966 (aged 68) Valley City, North Dakota, U.S.
- Party: Republican

Fred George Aandahl (April 9, 1897 – April 7, 1966) was an American Republican politician from North Dakota. He served as the 23rd governor of North Dakota from 1945 to 1951 and as a U.S. representative from 1951 to 1953.

== Early life ==
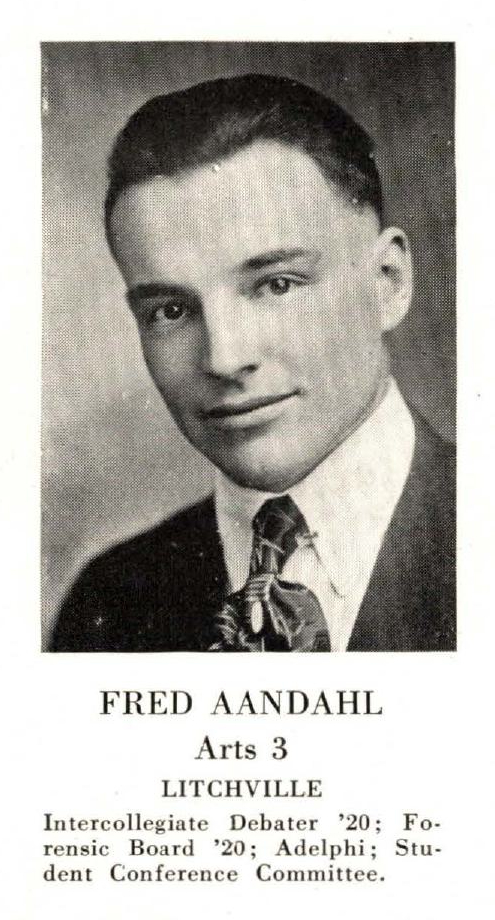
Aandahl in the University of North Dakota yearbook, 1921

Aandahl was born in Svea Township, North Dakota, the son of Norwegian emigrant Soren "Sam" J. Aandahl and his American-born wife, Mamie C. (Lawry) Aandahl. He graduated from Litchville High School, and then from the University of North Dakota in 1921 and became a farmer. He was a schoolteacher, a principal, and then superintendent of Litchville's schools from 1922 to 1927. On June 28, 1926, he married Luella Brekke, and they had three daughters.

== Career ==
In 1931, 1939 and 1941 Aandahl was member of the North Dakota State Senate. From 1945 to 1951 he was governor of the state, and during his tenure, natural resources were protected and conservation programs were promoted. He was elected as a Republican to the Eighty-second United States Congress (January 3, 1951 – January 3, 1953). He was not a candidate for the Eighty-third Congress in 1952, but was an unsuccessful candidate for the United States Senate, losing 58%-42% to incumbent William Langer in the Republican Primary. Aandahl then ran in the general election against Langer and Democrat Harold A. Morrison and finished in third place and 10% of the vote. From 1953 to 1961 he was appointed Assistant Secretary of the Interior during both of President Dwight D. Eisenhower's administrations.

== Death ==
Aandahl died in Fargo, North Dakota and was interred in Hillside Cemetery, Valley City.

Party political offices
Preceded by Oscar W. Hagen	Republican nominee for Governor of North Dakota; 1944, 1946, 1948	Succeeded by Norman Brunsdale
Political offices
Preceded by John Moses	Governor of North Dakota; 1945–1951	Succeeded by Clarence Norman Brunsdale
U.S. House of Representatives
Preceded by William Lemke	Member of the U.S. House of Representatives from North Dakota's at-large district 1951–1953	Succeeded by Otto Krueger
