= York, Clark County, Wisconsin =

York, Wisconsin
- Town
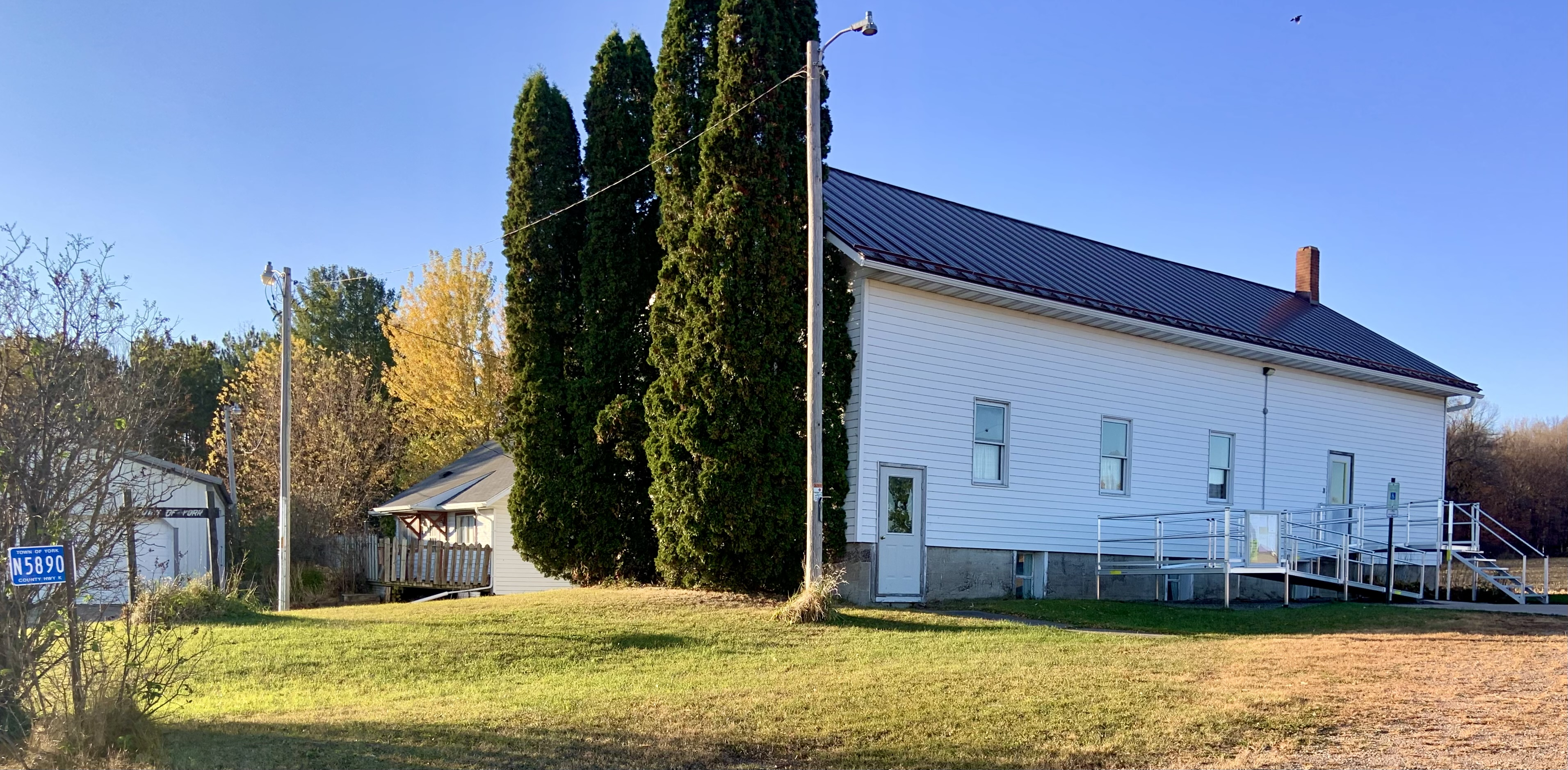
- Town hall

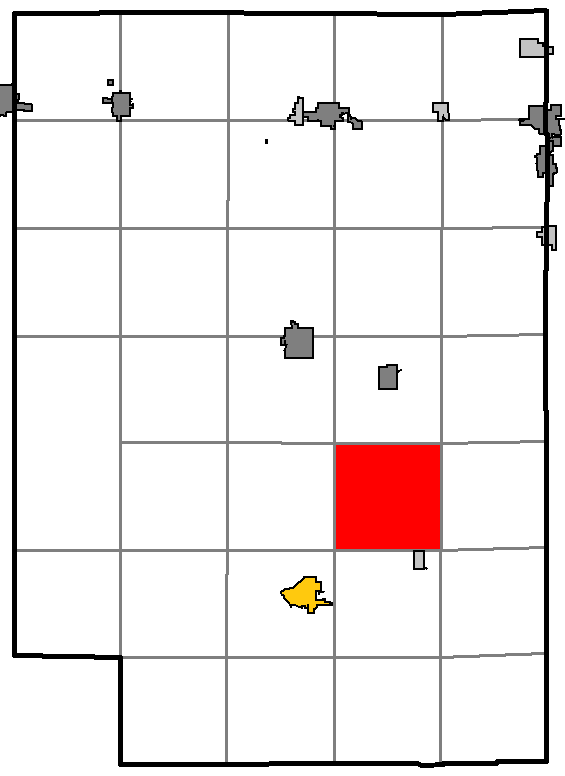
- Location of York, Clark County

- Location of Clark County, Wisconsin
- Coordinates: 44°38′3″N 90°29′56″W
- Country: United States
- State: Wisconsin
- County: Clark

Area
  - Total: 36.1 sq mi (93.5 km^{2})
  - Land: 36.1 sq mi (93.5 km^{2})
  - Water: 0 sq mi (0.0 km^{2})
- Elevation: 1,188 ft (362 m)

Population (2020)
  - Total: 844
  - Density: 23.4/sq mi (9.03/km^{2})
- Time zone: UTC-6 (Central (CST))
  - Summer (DST): UTC-5 (CDT)
- Area codes: 715 & 534
- FIPS code: 55-89425
- GNIS feature ID: 1584492

York is a town in Clark County in the U.S. state of Wisconsin. The population was 844 at the 2020 census.

== Geography ==
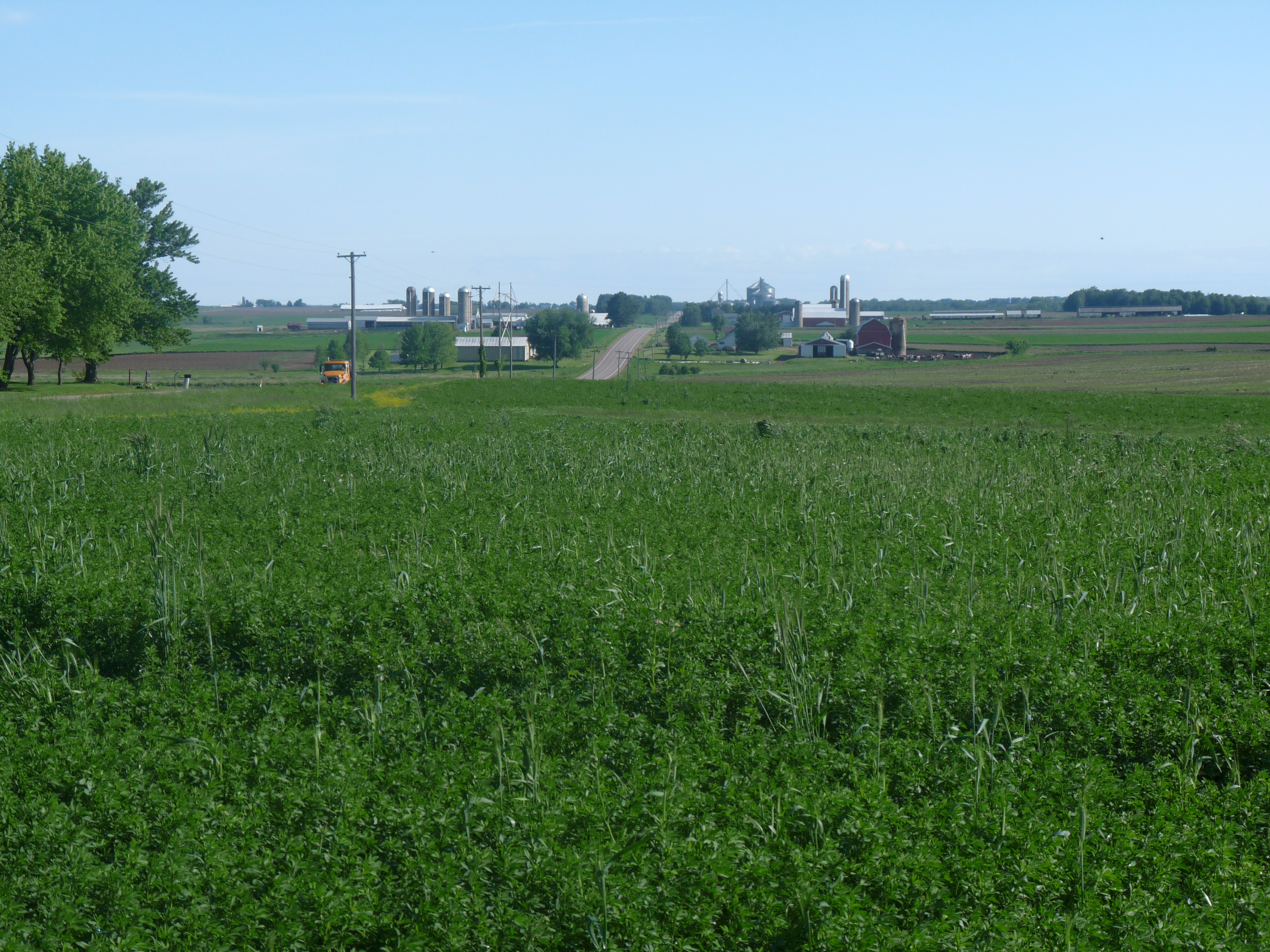
Much of York is rolling farmland like this. Facing north near County K.

According to the United States Census Bureau, the town has a total area of 36.1 square miles (93.5 km^{2}), all land.

== Demographics ==
At the 2000 census there were 853 people, 266 households, and 214 families in the town. The population density was 23.6 people per square mile (9.1/km^{2}). There were 279 housing units at an average density of 7.7 per square mile (3.0/km^{2}). The racial makeup of the town was 98.71% White, 0.12% Native American, 0.12% Asian, 0.59% from other races, and 0.47% from two or more races. Hispanic or Latino of any race were 1.17%.

Of the 266 households 39.8% had children under the age of 18 living with them, 72.2% were married couples living together, 3.0% had a female householder with no husband present, and 19.5% were non-families. 15.0% of households were one person and 5.3% were one person aged 65 or older. The average household size was 3.21 and the average family size was 3.59.

The age distribution was 31.7% under the age of 18, 10.4% from 18 to 24, 25.3% from 25 to 44, 22.7% from 45 to 64, and 9.8% 65 or older. The median age was 34 years. For every 100 females, there were 106.5 males. For every 100 females age 18 and over, there were 105.3 males.

The median household income was $38,500 and the median family income was $45,000. Males had a median income of $25,375 versus $21,473 for females. The per capita income for the town was $14,133. About 4.8% of families and 12.1% of the population were below the poverty line, including 16.0% of those under age 18 and 4.9% of those age 65 or over.
