= 1921 United States gubernatorial elections =

- October 28, 1921 (ND); November 8, 1921 (VA)

2 governorships (Note: Including a recall election in North Dakota.)
	Majority party	Minority party
Party	Republican	Democratic
Seats before	34	14
Seats after	34	14
Seat change	Steady	Steady
Seats up	1	1
Seats won	1	1
- Democratic hold Republican hold

United States gubernatorial elections were held in 1921, in two states.

Virginia holds its gubernatorial elections in odd numbered years, every 4 years, following the United States presidential election year.

In North Dakota, the first-ever gubernatorial recall election was held. Incumbent governor Lynn Frazier was the first American governor ever successfully recalled from office; there would not be another successful recall of a governor until California Governor Gray Davis was recalled in 2003.

This election marked Republican's largest gubernatorial extent in history, tying with Jim Justice's party switch in 2017.

== Results ==
State	Incumbent	Party	Status	Opposing candidates
North Dakota (recall election) (held, October 28, 1921)	Lynn J. Frazier	R-NPL	Defeated, 49.06%	Ragnvald A. Nestos (R-IVA) 50.94%
Virginia (held, November 8, 1921)	Westmoreland Davis	Democratic	Term-limited, Democratic victory	Elbert Lee Trinkle (Democratic) 66.15% Henry W. Anderson (Republican) 31.24% John Mitchell Jr. (Black and Tan Republican) 2.39% John P. Goodman (Independent) 0.12% Mrs. George Custis (Independent) 0.11%
