= George E. Wallace (North Dakota politician) =

American politician (1872–1952)

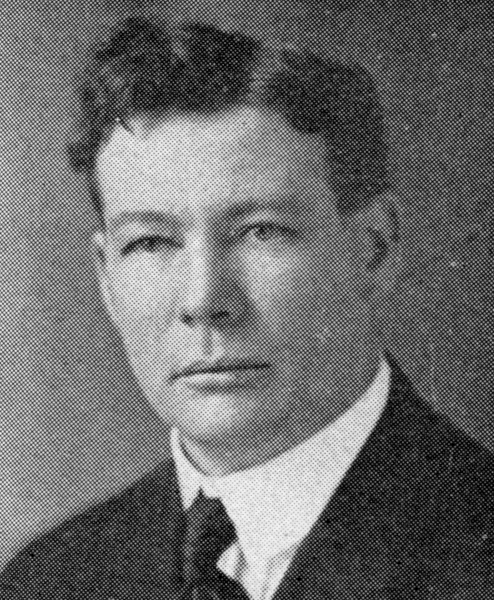

1st North Dakota Tax Commissioner
- In office 1919–1921
- Governor: Lynn Frazier; Ragnvald Nestos
- Preceded by: Office established
- Succeeded by: C. C. Converse

Personal details
- Born: August 16, 1872 Arcola, Indiana
- Died: April 15, 1952 (aged 79) Minneapolis, Minnesota
- Spouse: Mary A. Gallup

George E. Wallace was an American lawyer and politician from North Dakota. He served as the first North Dakota Tax Commissioner from 1919 to 1921.

== Biography ==
=== Early life ===
George E. Wallace was born in Villisca, Iowa, on August 16, 1872. He attended school in Villisca, and later attended the University of Minnesota and the University of Iowa. In June 1897, he moved to North Dakota, settling in Wahpeton, and worked as an attorney. In 1899, he married Mary A. Gallup.

=== Tax Commissioner ===
In 1912, Governor John Burke appointed Wallace to serve on the three-member State Tax Commission, a precursor to the Office of State Tax Commissioner. In the 1910s, Wallace became involved with the Nonpartisan League (NPL).

In 1919, Governor Lynn Frazier appointed Wallace to serve as the first Tax Commissioner, replacing the three-member Tax Commission. He served as Tax Commissioner from 1919 to 1921.

In October 1921, the opponents of the NPL, particularly the Independent Voters Association (IVA), held a special recall election that deposed all the members of the Industrial Commission: Lynn Frazier (Governor), John N. Hagan (Commissioner of Agriculture and Labor), and William Lemke (Attorney General). In December 1921, under the new administration of Governor R. A. Nestos, Wallace was removed from office and replaced with C. C. Converse.

=== Legal troubles ===
Following his removal from office, Wallace's problems with the new administration continued. He became entangled in a lawsuit with the state regarding a house that had been built for him in Bismarck by the controversial Home Building Association (HBA), which was a program of the NPL.

The HBA program often had significant cost overruns, and many homeowners refused to pay the extra cost because it was well above the agreed-upon price. To recover as much of the costs as possible, the state pursued settlements and/or lawsuits with the homeowners, some of whom were NPL members who benefited from the HBA program.

NPL members like William Lemke (NPL leader and Attorney General), George Totten (member of the Board of Administration), John N. Hagan (Commissioner of Agriculture and Labor), and George E. Wallace (Tax Commissioner) would be part of the HBA scandals.

Eventually, in 1923, Judge Thomas H. Pugh of Dickinson ruled a reasonable value for the Wallace house would be $8,000, instead of the nearly $12,000 claimed by the state or the roughly $6,000 claimed by Wallace. Wallace was told to pay the amount deemed to be reasonable or let the house go back to the state.

=== Later life ===
Wallace later moved to Minneapolis and continued working as an attorney. He died on April 15, 1952.

== See also ==
- List of North Dakota tax commissioners
