= 1924 North Dakota gubernatorial election =

- November 4, 1924
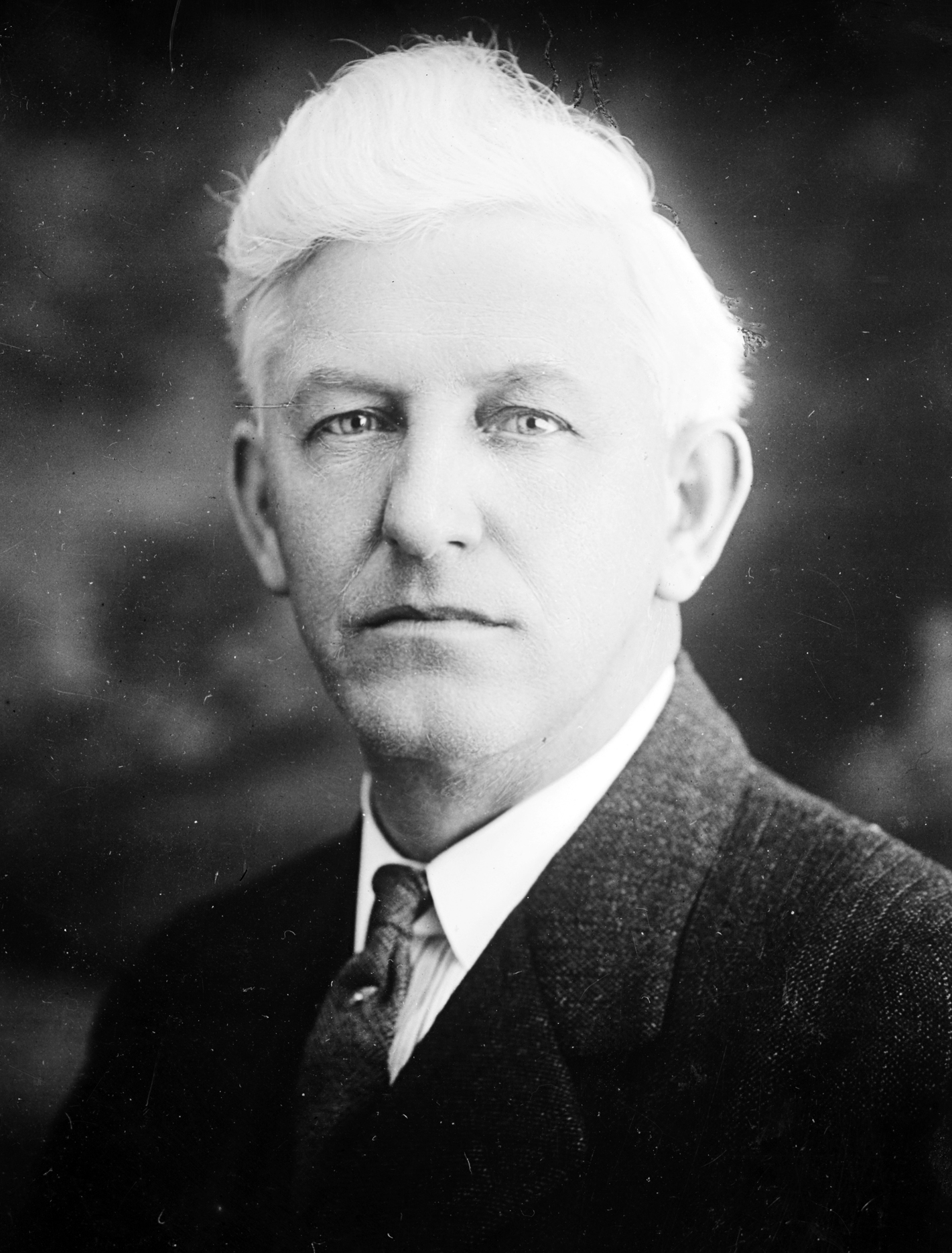

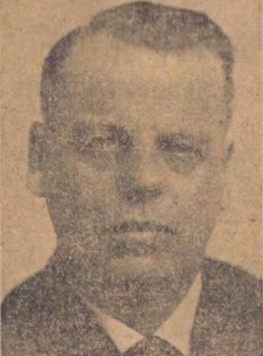
Nominee	Arthur G. Sorlie	Halvor L. Halvorson
Party	Republican	Democratic
Alliance	Nonpartisan League
Popular vote	101,170	86,414
Percentage	53.93%	46.07%
- County results Sorlie: 50–60% 60–70% 70–80% Halvorson: 50–60% 60–70%
Governor before election
Ragnvald A. Nestos
Republican
Elected Governor
Arthur G. Sorlie
Republican

The 1924 North Dakota gubernatorial election was held on November 4, 1924.

Incumbent Republican Governor Ragnvald A. Nestos was defeated for re-nomination in the Republican primary.

Republican nominee Arthur G. Sorlie defeated Democratic nominee Halvor L. Halvorson with 53.93% of the vote.

== Primary elections ==
Primary elections were held on June 25, 1924.

=== Republican primary ===
==== Candidates ====
- Ingram J. Moe, head of the North Dakota Good Roads association and former mayor of Valley City
- Ragnvald A. Nestos, incumbent Governor (supported by the Independent Voters Association)
- Arthur G. Sorlie, member of the Grand Forks City Council (supported by the Nonpartisan League)

==== Results ====
Republican primary results
Party	Candidate	Votes	%
Non-Partisan League	Arthur G. Sorlie	73,000	48.56
Republican/IVA	Ragnvald A. Nestos (inc.)	70,783	47.09
Republican	Ingram J. Moe	6,544	4.35
Total votes		150,327	100.00

=== Democratic primary ===
==== Candidates ====
- Halvor L. Halvorson, Democratic candidate for North Dakota's 3rd congressional district in 1912, 1914 and 1918
- Dr. L. S. Platou, unsuccessful candidate for Democratic nomination for Governor in 1916 and 1922

==== Results ====
Democratic primary results
Party	Candidate	Votes	%
Democratic	Halvor L. Halvorson	6,020	53.44
Democratic	L. S. Platou	5,244	46.56
Total votes		11,264	100.00

== General election ==
=== Candidates ===
- Halvor L. Halvorson, Democratic
- Arthur G. Sorlie, Republican

=== Results ===
1924 North Dakota gubernatorial election
Party	Candidate	Votes	%	±%
Republican	Arthur G. Sorlie	101,170	53.93	▼3.72
Democratic	Halvor L. Halvorson	86,414	46.07	N/A
Majority		14,756	7.86	▼7.44
Total votes		187,584	100.00	
Republican hold				

== Bibliography ==
- Gubernatorial Elections, 1787-1997. Washington, D.C.: Congressional Quarterly Inc. 1998. ISBN 1-56802-396-0.
