= 1928 United States Senate election in North Dakota =

- November 6, 1928
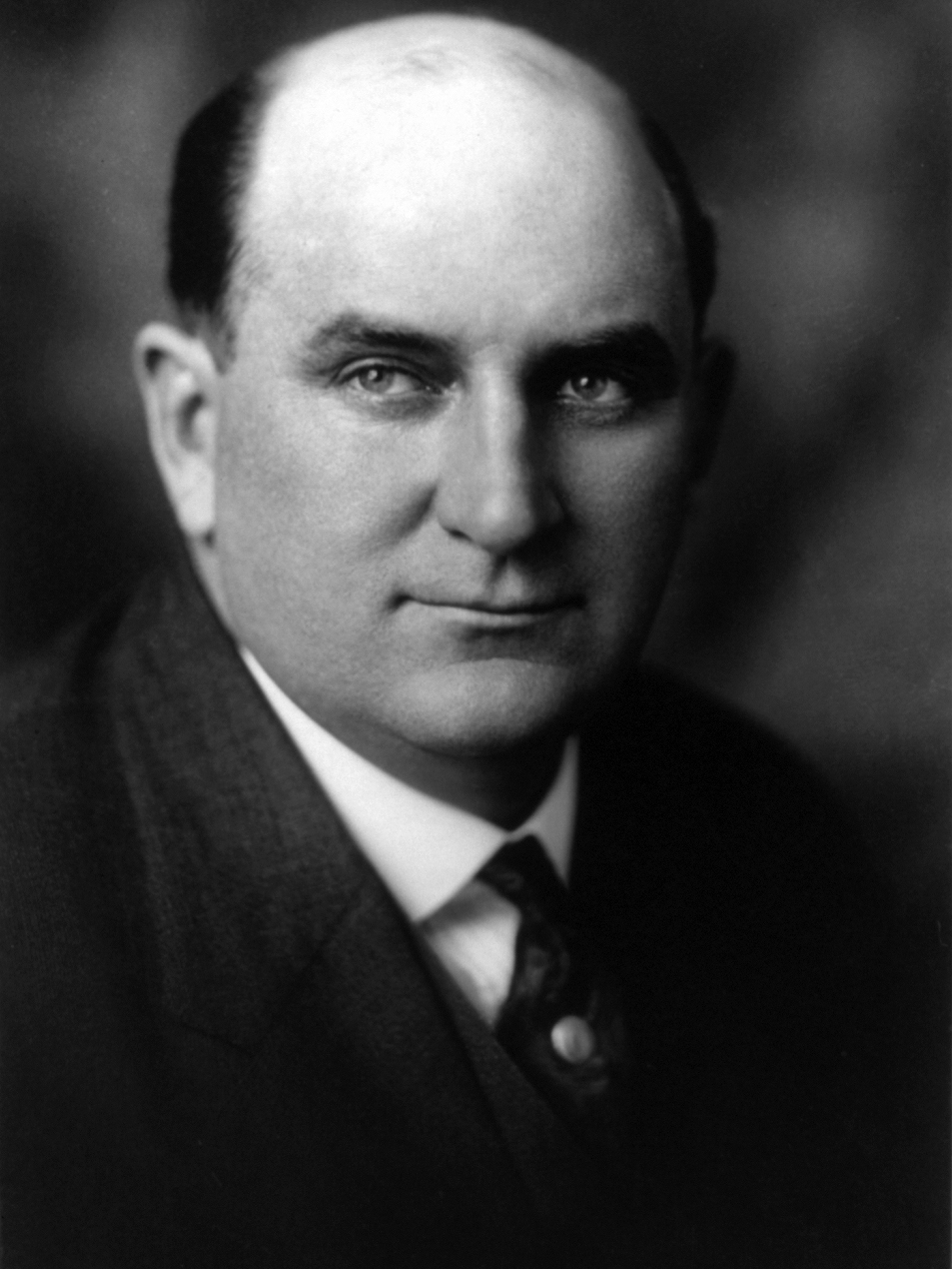

Nominee	Lynn Frazier	F. F. Burchard
Party	Republican	Democratic
Popular vote	159,940	38,856
Percentage	79.63%	19.35%
- County results Frazier: 60–70% 70–80% 80–90% 90–100%
U.S. senator before election
Lynn Frazier
Republican
Elected U.S. Senator
Lynn Frazier
Republican

The 1928 United States Senate election in North Dakota took place on November 6, 1928. Incumbent Republican Senator Lynn Frazier, who was first elected in 1922, sought re-election. Frazier faced former Governor Ragnvald Nestos in the Republican primary, and won re-nomination. In the general election, he faced F. F. Burchard, a gubernatorial appointee to the state mill. Frazier won his second term in a landslide over Burchard, winning by the largest margin for a Republican Senate candidate in North Dakota until 2016.

== Democratic primary ==
=== Candidates ===
- F. F. Burchard, 1926 Democratic nominee for the U.S. Senate, gubernatorial appointee to the state mill

=== Results ===
Democratic primary results
Party	Candidate	Votes	%
Democratic	F. F. Burchard	11,086	100.00%
Total votes		11,086	100.00%

== Republican primary ==
=== Candidates ===
- Lynn Frazier, incumbent U.S. Senator
- Ragnvald Nestos, former Governor of North Dakota
- C. P. Stone, businessman and 1926 independent Republican candidate for the U.S. Senate
- Herman N. Midtbo, perennial candidate

=== Results ===
Republican primary results
Party	Candidate	Votes	%
Republican	Lynn Frazier (inc.)	96,618	52.30%
Republican	Ragnvald Nestos	76,179	41.24%
Republican	C. P. Stone	10,247	5.55%
Republican	Herman N. Midtbo	1,685	0.91%
Total votes		184,729	100.00%

== General election ==
=== Results ===
1928 United States Senate election in North Dakota
Party	Candidate	Votes	%	±%
Republican	Lynn Frazier (inc.)	159,940	79.63%	+27.35%
Democratic	F. F. Burchard	38,856	19.35%	−28.37%
Farmer–Labor	Alfred Knutson	2,047	1.02%	—
Majority		121,084	60.29%	+55.72%
Turnout		200,843		
Republican hold				
