= 1920 North Dakota gubernatorial election =

- November 2, 1920
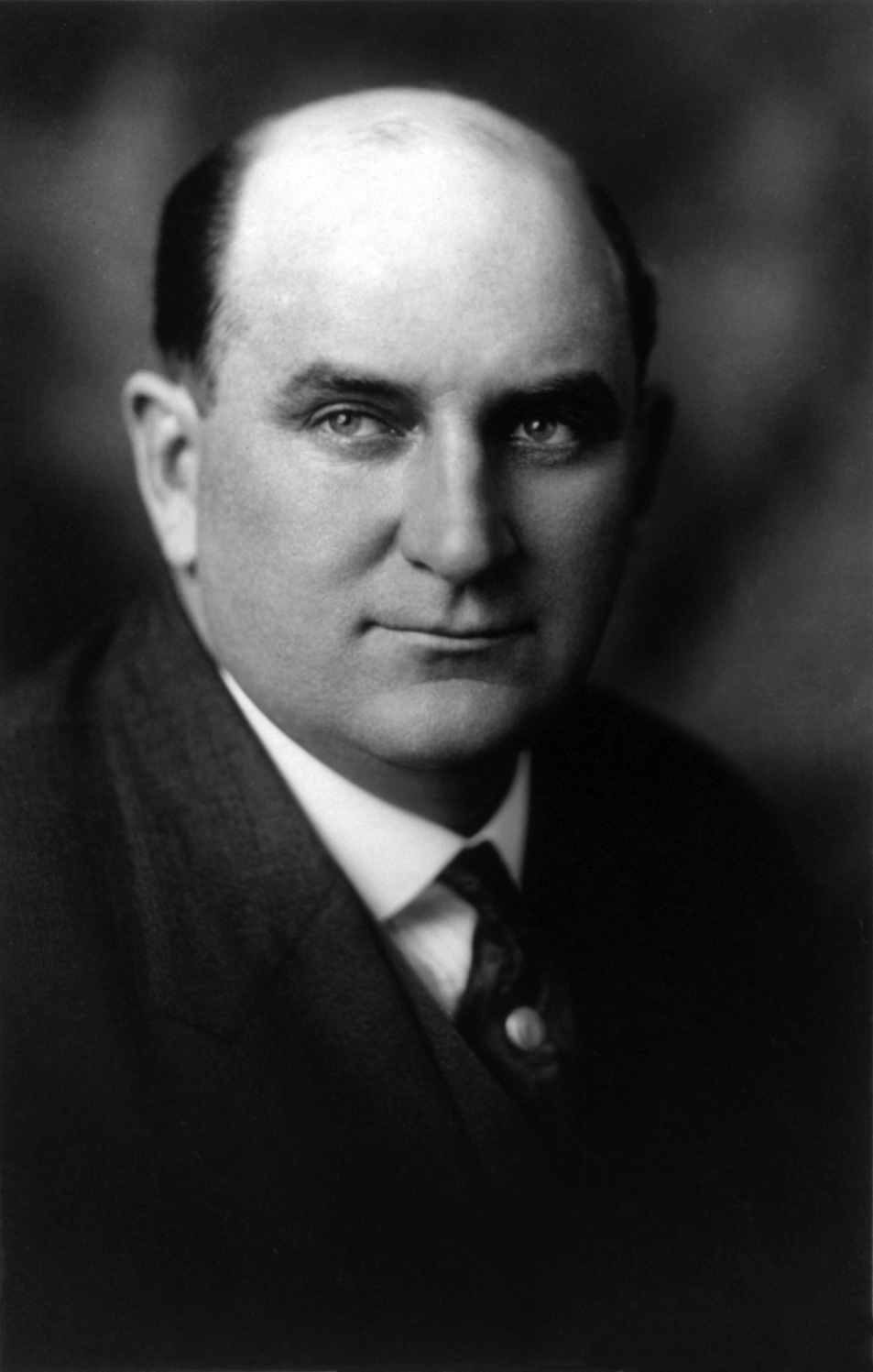

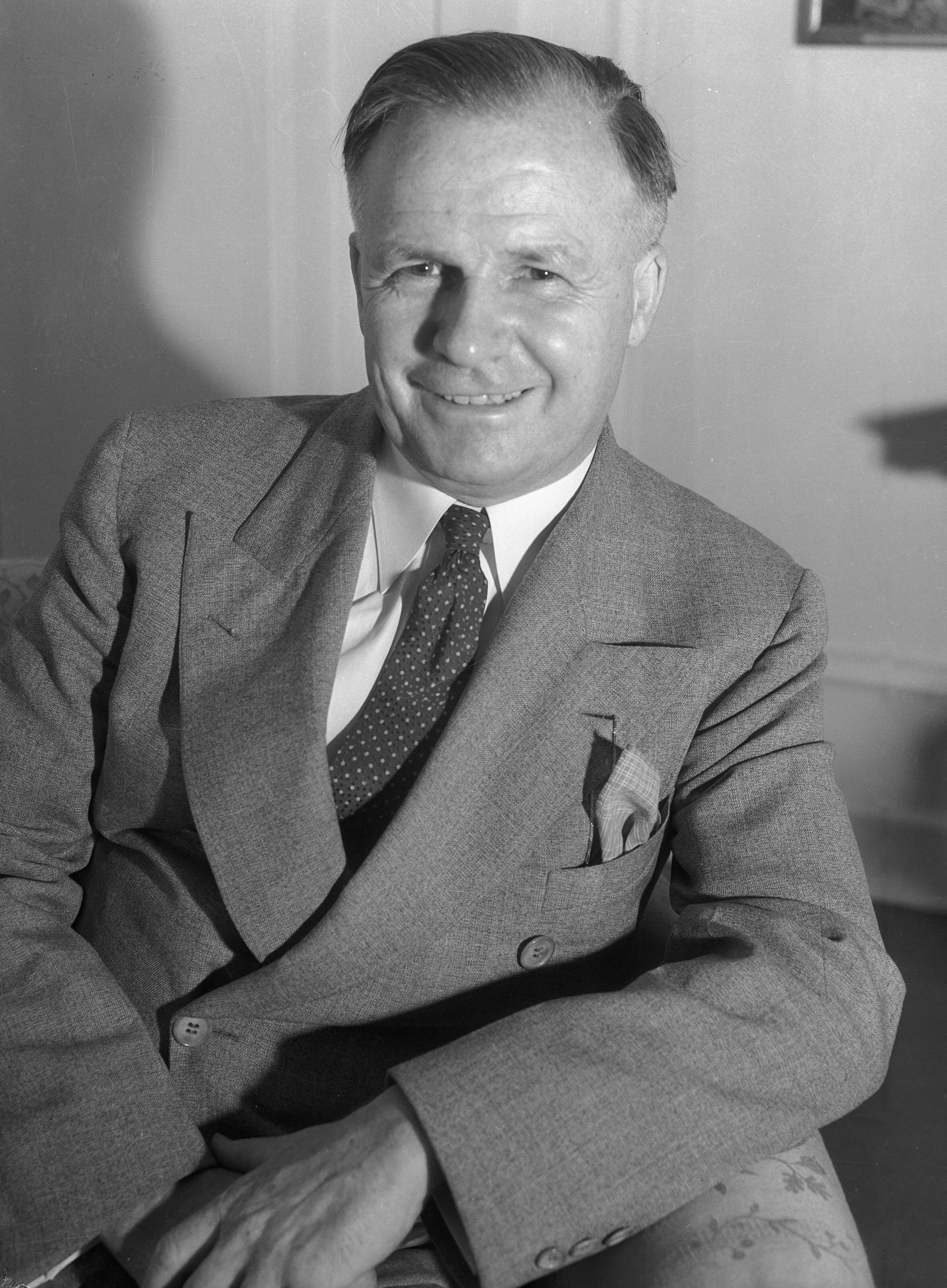
Nominee	Lynn Frazier	James Francis Thaddeus O'Connor
Party	Republican	Democratic
Alliance	Nonpartisan League
Popular vote	117,118	112,488
Percentage	51.01%	48.99%
- County results Frazier: 50–60% 60–70% 70–80% O'Connor: 50–60% 60–70%
Governor before election
Lynn Frazier
Republican
Elected Governor
Lynn Frazier
Republican

The 1920 North Dakota gubernatorial election was held on November 2, 1920. Incumbent Republican Lynn Frazier defeated Democratic nominee James Francis Thaddeus O'Connor with 51.01% of the vote.

== Primary elections ==
Primary elections were held on June 30, 1920.

=== Republican primary ===
==== Candidates ====
- Lynn Frazier, incumbent Governor
- William Langer, North Dakota Attorney General

==== Results ====
Republican primary results
Party	Candidate	Votes	%
Republican	Lynn Frazier (inc.)	59,355	52.39
Republican	William Langer	53,941	47.61
Total votes		113,296	100.00

== General election ==
=== Candidates ===
- Lynn Frazier, Republican
- James Francis Thaddeus O'Connor, Democratic

=== Results ===
1920 North Dakota gubernatorial election
Party	Candidate	Votes	%	±%
Republican	Lynn Frazier (inc.)	117,118	51.01	▼8.73
Democratic	James Francis Thaddeus O'Connor	112,488	48.99	▲8.73
Majority		4,630	2.02	▼17.47
Total votes		229,606	100.00	
Republican hold				
