= Senator Hoffner =

Senator Hoffner may refer to:

- Buckshot Hoffner (1924–2015), North Dakota State Senate
- Kyra Hoffner (fl. 2020s), Delaware State Senate
