= 1918 North Dakota gubernatorial election =

- November 5, 1918
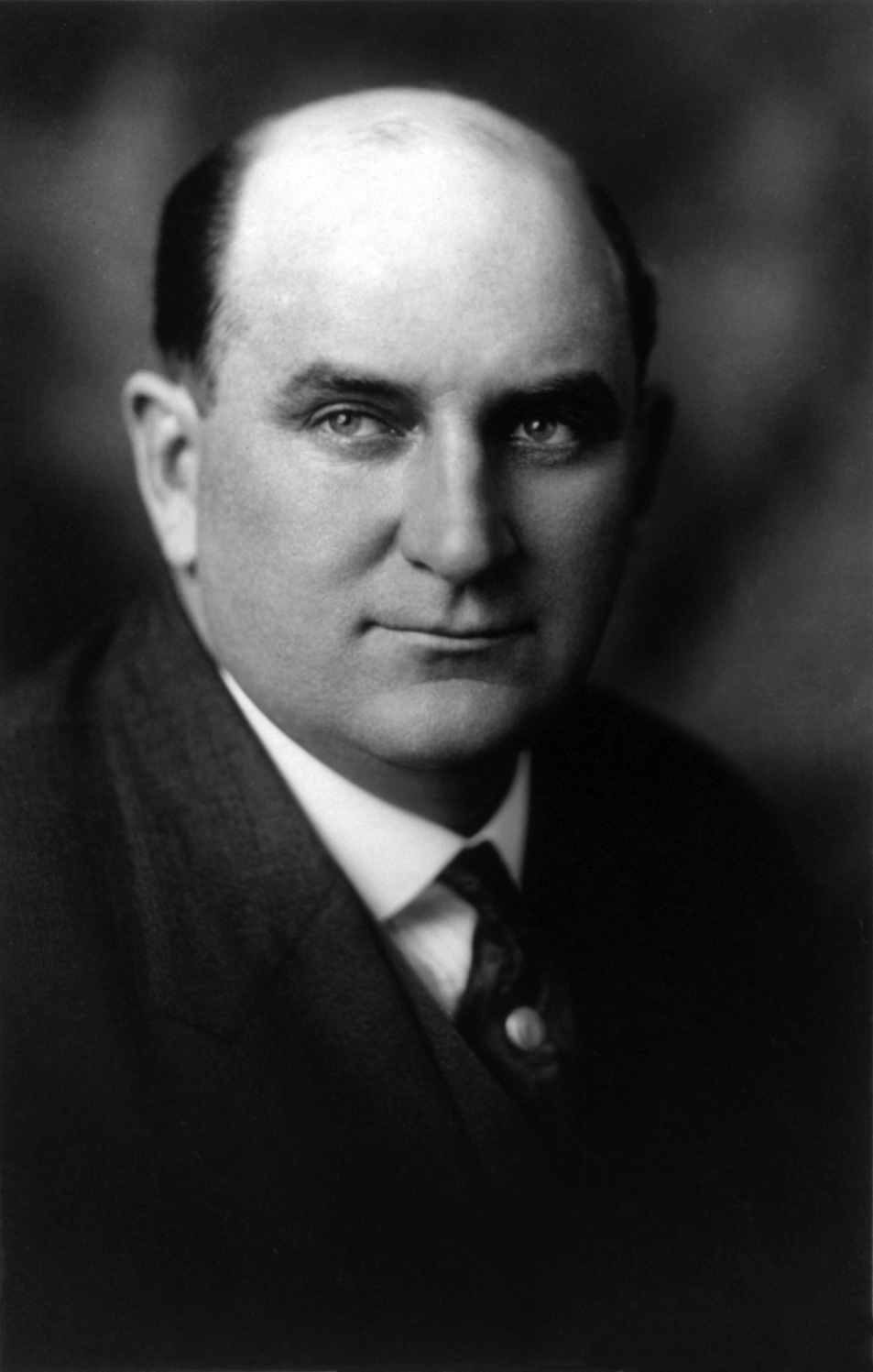

Nominee	Lynn Frazier	S. J. Doyle
Party	Republican	Democratic
Alliance	Nonpartisan League
Popular vote	54,517	36,733
Percentage	59.74%	40.26%
- County results Frazier: 50–60% 60–70% 70–80% 80–90% Doyle: 50–60%
Governor before election
Lynn Frazier
Republican
Elected Governor
Lynn Frazier
Republican

The 1918 North Dakota gubernatorial election was held on November 5, 1918. Incumbent Republican Lynn Frazier defeated Democratic nominee S. J. Doyle with 59.74% of the vote.

== Primary elections ==
Primary elections were held on June 26, 1918.

=== Democratic primary ===
==== Candidates ====
- S. J. Doyle
- G. W. Wilkinson

==== Results ====
Democratic primary results
Party	Candidate	Votes	%
Democratic	S. J. Doyle	7,280	66.76
Democratic	G. W. Wilkinson	3,625	33.24
Total votes		10,905	100.00

=== Republican primary ===
==== Candidates ====
- Lynn Frazier, incumbent Governor
- John Steen, North Dakota State Treasurer

==== Results ====
Republican primary results
Party	Candidate	Votes	%
Republican	Lynn Frazier (inc.)	54,382	59.07
Republican	John Steen	37,682	40.93
Total votes		92,064	100.00

== General election ==
=== Candidates ===
- Lynn Frazier, Republican
- S. J. Doyle, Democratic

=== Results ===
1918 North Dakota gubernatorial election
Party	Candidate	Votes	%	±%
Republican	Lynn Frazier (inc.)	54,517	59.74	▼19.50
Democratic	S. J. Doyle	36,733	40.26	▲21.86
Majority		17,784	19.49	▼41.35
Total votes		91,250	100.00	
Republican hold				
