= 1934 United States Senate election in North Dakota =

- November 6, 1934
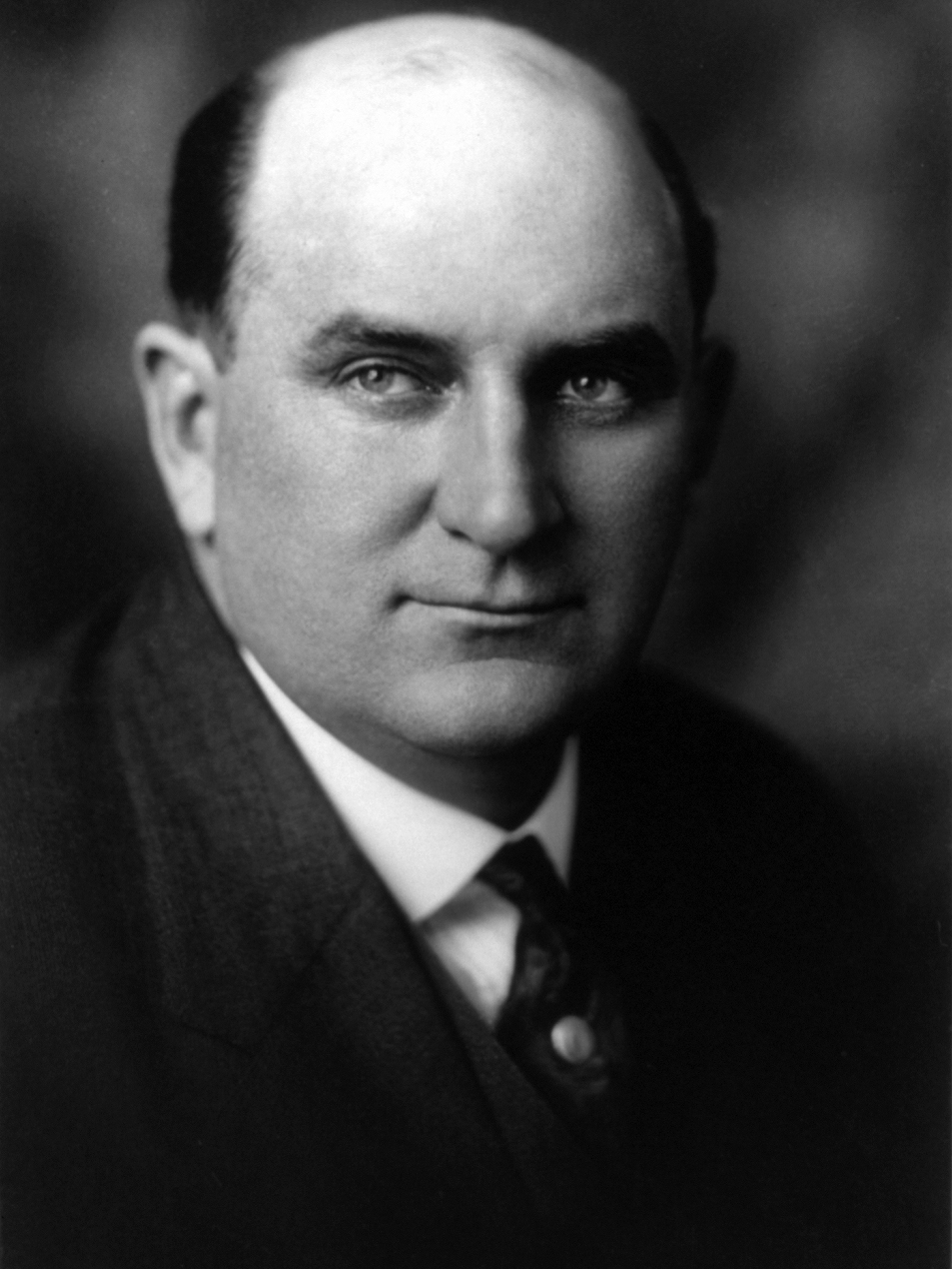

Nominee	Lynn Frazier	Henry Holt
Party	Republican	Democratic
Popular vote	151,205	104,477
Percentage	58.24%	40.24%
- County results Frazier: 50–60% 60–70% 70–80% Holt: 50–60%
U.S. senator before election
Lynn Frazier
Republican
Elected U.S. Senator
Lynn Frazier
Republican

The 1934 United States Senate election in North Dakota took place on November 6, 1934. Incumbent Republican Senator Lynn Frazier, first elected in 1922, ran for re-election to a third term. He easily won the Republican primary and faced Grand Forks City Commissioner Henry Holt in the general election. Despite significant Democratic gains nationwide, Frazier easily defeated Holt to win re-election.

== Democratic primary ==
=== Candidates ===
- Henry Holt, Grand Forks City Commissioner

=== Results ===
Democratic primary results
Party	Candidate	Votes	%
Democratic	Henry Holt	35,661	100.00%
Total votes		35,661	100.00%

== Republican primary ==
=== Candidates ===
- Lynn Frazier, incumbent U.S. Senator
- Charles S. Buck, former State Representative and Jamestown City Attorney

=== Results ===
Republican primary results
Party	Candidate	Votes	%
Republican	Lynn Frazier (inc.)	153,088	83.22%
Republican	Charles S. Buck	30,873	16.78%
Total votes		183,961	100.00%

== General election ==
=== Results ===
1934 United States Senate election in North Dakota
Party	Candidate	Votes	%	±%
Republican	Lynn Frazier (inc.)	151,205	58.24%	−21.39%
Democratic	Henry Holt	104,477	40.24%	+20.90%
Independent	Alfred S. Dale	3,269	1.26%	—
Independent	Arvo F. Husa	656	0.25%	—
Majority		46,728	18.00%	−42.29%
Turnout		259,607		
Republican hold				
