= 1922 North Dakota gubernatorial election =

- November 7, 1922
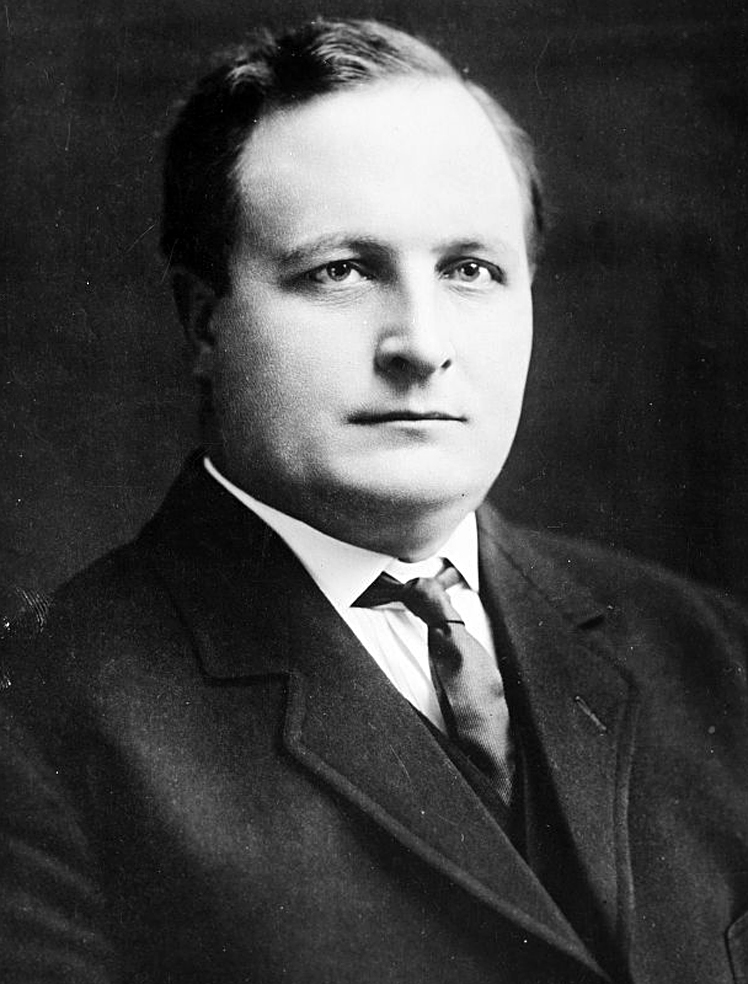

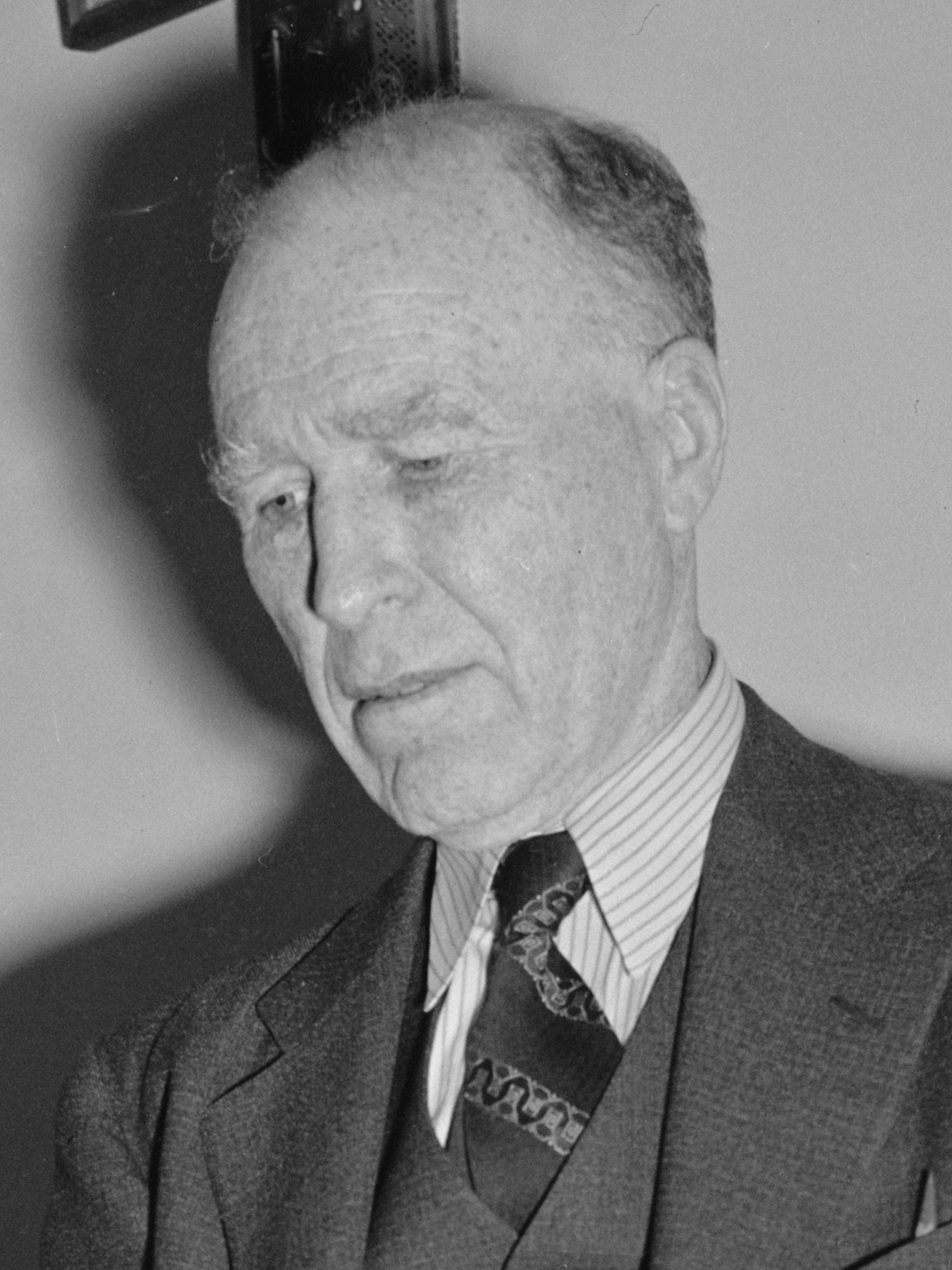
Nominee	Ragnvald Nestos	William Lemke
Party	Republican	Non-Partisan League
Popular vote	110,321	81,048
Percentage	57.65%	42.35%
- County results Nestos: 50–60% 60–70% 70–80% Lemke: 50–60% 60–70% 70–80% Tie: 50%
Governor before election
Ragnvald Nestos
Republican
Elected Governor
Ragnvald Nestos
Republican

The 1922 North Dakota gubernatorial election was held on November 7, 1922. Incumbent Republican Ragnvald Nestos defeated Nonpartisan League nominee William Lemke with 57.65% of the vote.

== Primary elections ==
Primary elections were held on June 28, 1922.

=== Republican primary ===
==== Candidates ====
- Bert F. Baker, state senator
- Ragnvald Nestos, incumbent governor
- Harvey L. Stegner

==== Results ====
Republican primary results
Party	Candidate	Votes	%
Republican	Ragnvald Nestos (inc.)	93,551	51.87
Republican	Bert F. Baker	82,481	45.73
Republican	Harvey L. Stegner	4,336	2.40
Total votes		180,368	100.00

== General election ==
=== Candidates ===
- William Lemke, Nonpartisan League
- Ragnvald Nestos, Republican

=== Results ===
1922 North Dakota gubernatorial election
Party	Candidate	Votes	%	±%
Republican	Ragnvald Nestos (inc.)	110,321	57.65	▲6.75
Non-Partisan League	William Lemke	81,048	42.35	▼6.75
Majority		29,273	15.30	▲13.28
Total votes		191,369	100.00	
Republican hold				
