= Howard R. Wood =

American politician (1887–1958)

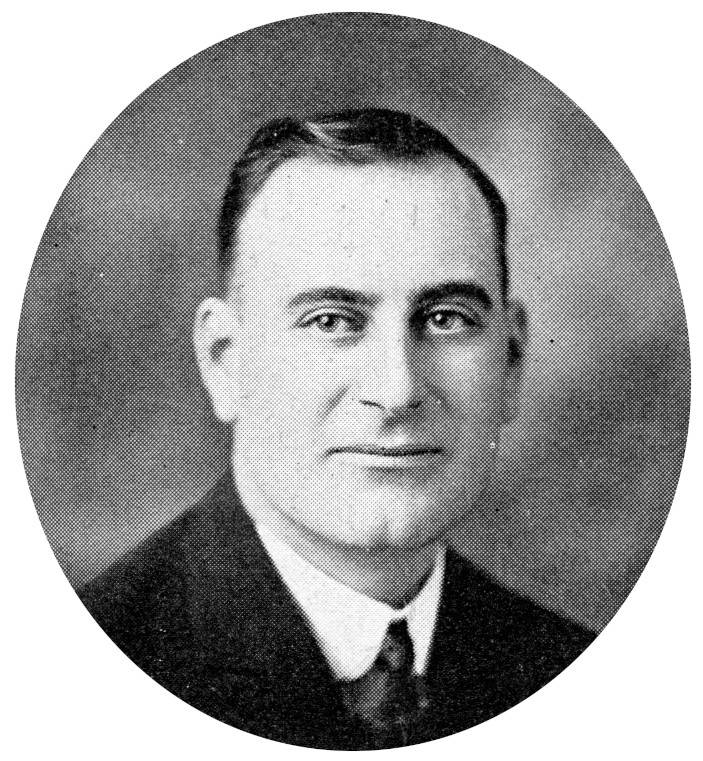

12th Lieutenant Governor of North Dakota
- In office 1919–1923
- Governor: Lynn Frazier; Ragnvald Nestos
- Preceded by: Anton T. Kraabel
- Succeeded by: Frank H. Hyland

Personal details
- Born: November 26, 1887 Dexter, Minnesota
- Died: August 5, 1958 (aged 70) Portland, Oregon
- Party: Republican
- Spouse: Sara M. McDonnell

Howard R. Wood (November 26, 1887–August 5, 1958) was a North Dakota Republican Party politician who served as the 12th lieutenant governor of North Dakota under Governors Lynn Frazier and Ragnvald A. Nestos.

Wood was born in Dexter, Minnesota, in 1887. Later, with his family, he moved to North Dakota, settling in Minot. Wood later moved to a farm near Deering, North Dakota. In 1910, Wood married Sara M. McDonnell. In the 1910s, Wood became involved with the Nonpartisan League (NPL).

In 1916, Wood was elected to the North Dakota House, and as speaker of the House, from 1917 to 1918. In 1918, Wood was elected Lieutenant Governor of North Dakota. He would be elected again in 1920, but he did not seek re-election in 1922.

== See also ==
- Lieutenant Governor of North Dakota
- List of speakers of the North Dakota House of Representatives

Political offices
Preceded by Anton T. Kraabel	Lieutenant Governor of North Dakota; 1919–1923	Succeeded by Frank H. Hyland
