= Fred and Gladys Grady House =

Historic house in North Dakota, United States

- U.S. National Register of Historic Places
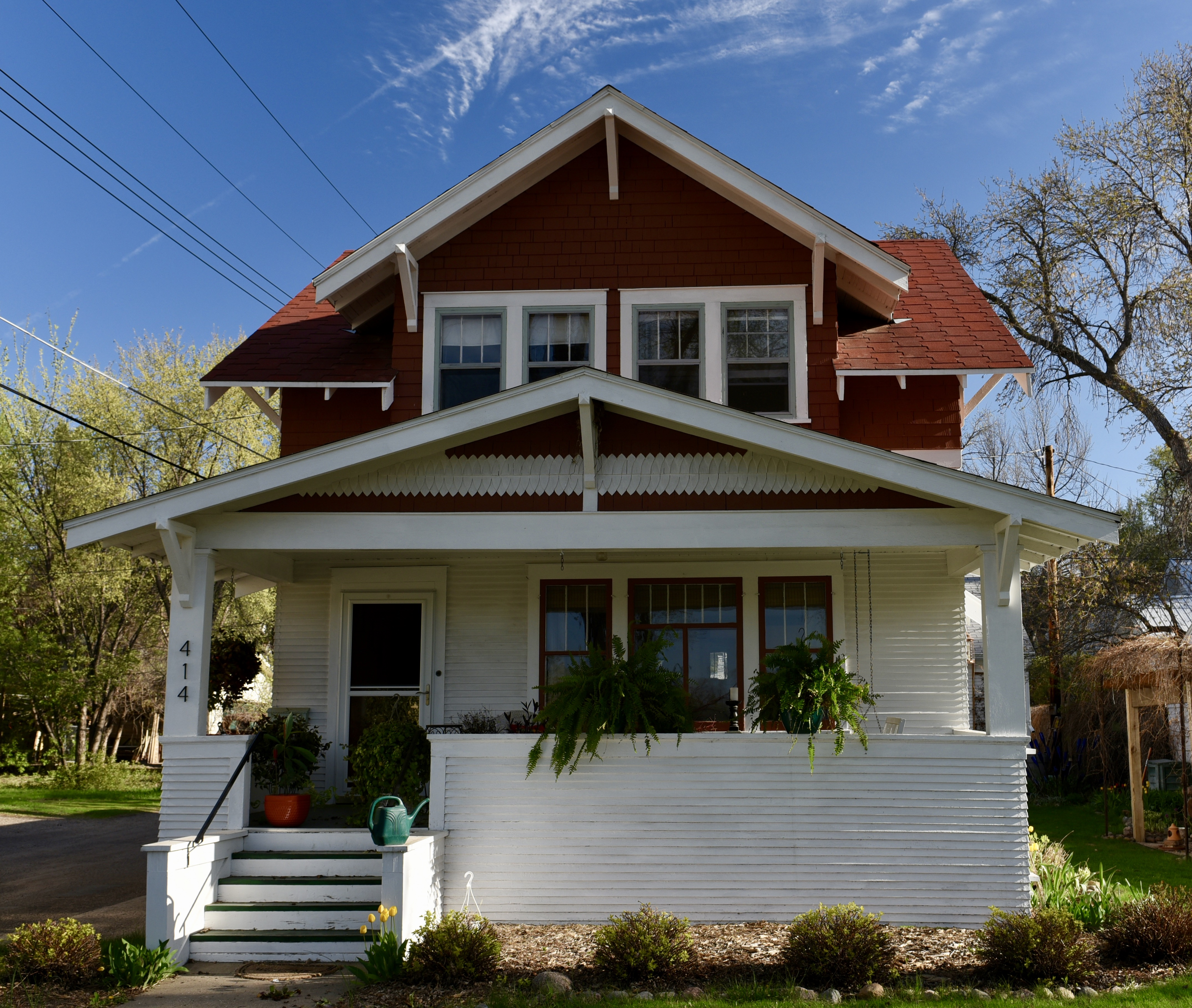

- Location within North Dakota Location within the United States
- Location: 414 East Avenue F Bismarck, North Dakota
- Coordinates: 46°48′56″N 100°47′5″W
- Area: less than one acre
- Built: 1920-1921
- Built by: Home Building Association of ND
- Architectural style: Bungalow/craftsman
- MPS: Nonpartisan League's Home Building Association Resources in North Dakota MPS
- NRHP reference No.: 06000636
- Added to NRHP: July 21, 2006

The Fred and Gladys Grady House on East Avenue F in Bismarck, North Dakota was built in 1920. It has also been known as the Grover and Mabel Riggs House. It was listed on the National Register of Historic Places in 2006.

It is asserted to be "an excellent and well-preserved example of the houses built by the Nonpartisan League's Home Building Association."

== See also ==
- Oliver and Gertrude Lundquist House, also a work of the Nonpartisan League's Home Building Association, in Bismarck, and NRHP-listed
