= Oliver and Gertrude Lundquist House =

Historic house in North Dakota, United States

- U.S. National Register of Historic Places
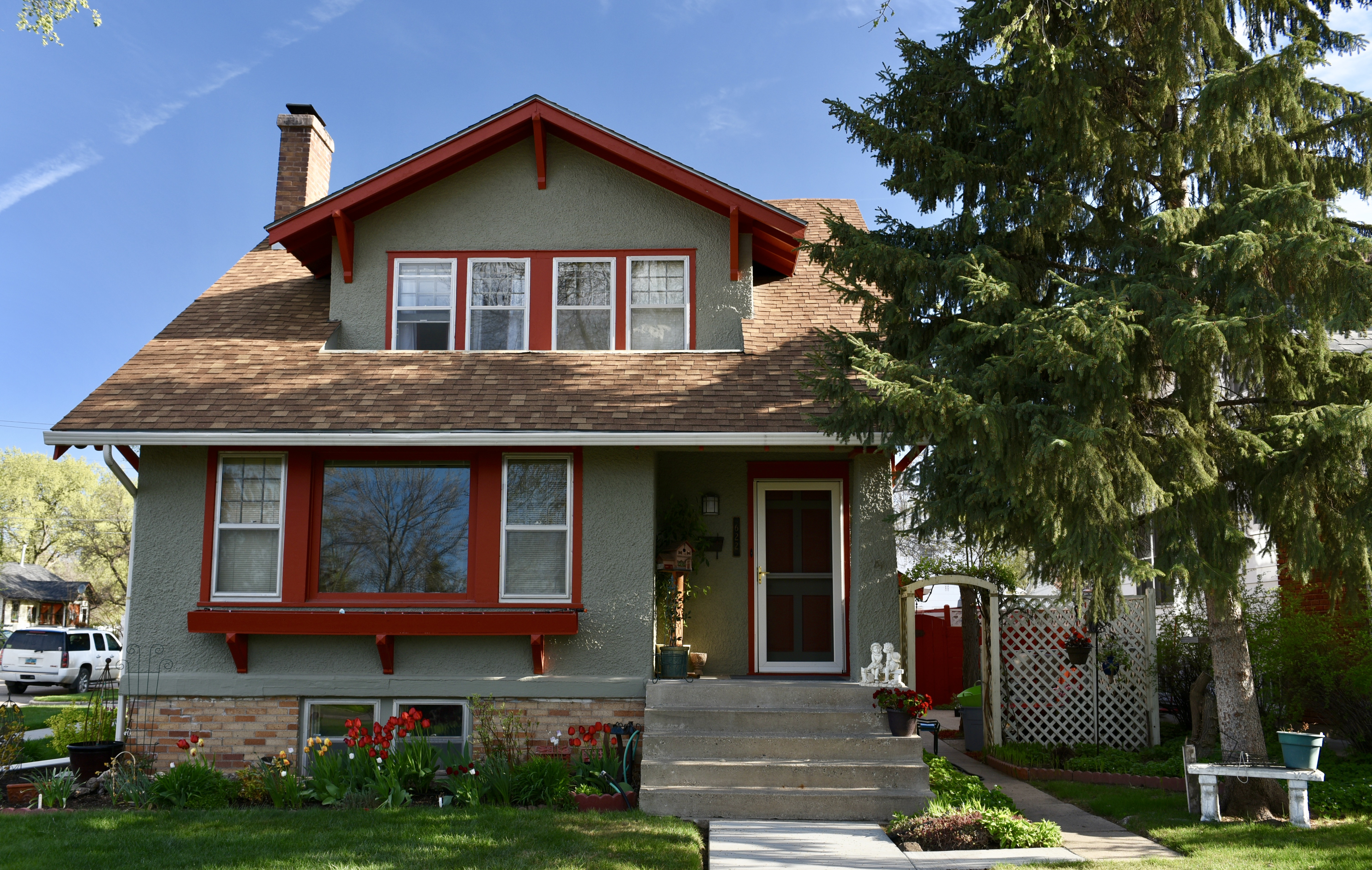
- Picture taken May 6, 2017

- Location within North Dakota Location within the United States
- Location: 622 W. Thayer St., Bismarck, North Dakota
- Coordinates: 46°48′29″N 100°48′0″W
- Area: less than one acre
- Built by: Home Building Association of ND
- Architectural style: Bungalow/Craftsman
- MPS: Nonpartisan League's Home Building Association Resources in North Dakota MPS
- NRHP reference No.: 06000637
- Added to NRHP: July 21, 2006

The Oliver and Gertrude Lundquist House on W. Thayer St. in Bismarck, North Dakota was listed on the National Register of Historic Places (NRHP) in 2006. It has also been known as the George and Ada Ebert House.

It is a work of the Nonpartisan League's Home Building Association.

== See also ==
- Fred and Gladys Grady House, another work of the Nonpartisan League's Home Building Association, in Bismarck, and NRHP-listed
