= E. W. Everson =

American politician (1857–1931)

E. W. Everson (April 29, 1857 – March 28, 1931) was a pioneer homesteader in Dakota Territory. He later served as a member of the North Dakota State House of Representatives.

Evan W. Everson was born at Hveem in Østre Toten Municipality in Oppland county, Norway. He was one of nine children born to Andrew Everson (1826–1892) and Johanna Everson (1828–1904). The family emigrated to the United States in 1866. Everson filed on a homestead near Walum in Griggs County during 1880.

Everson served as a justice of the peace for 16 years prior to his election to the North Dakota state legislature. He served in the North Dakota House of Representatives for three terms (1912, 1914 and 1916) representing the 16th District (Griggs and Steele counties). He was later a founder and two term President of the North Dakota Independent Voters Association which was formed in 1918. From 1923 to 1928, he operated a general store in partnership with Oscar Gilbertson, who was his son-in-law. He died at his home in 1931. His funeral was conducted at St. Olaf Lutheran Church Church in Walum.
