= 1940 United States Senate election in North Dakota =

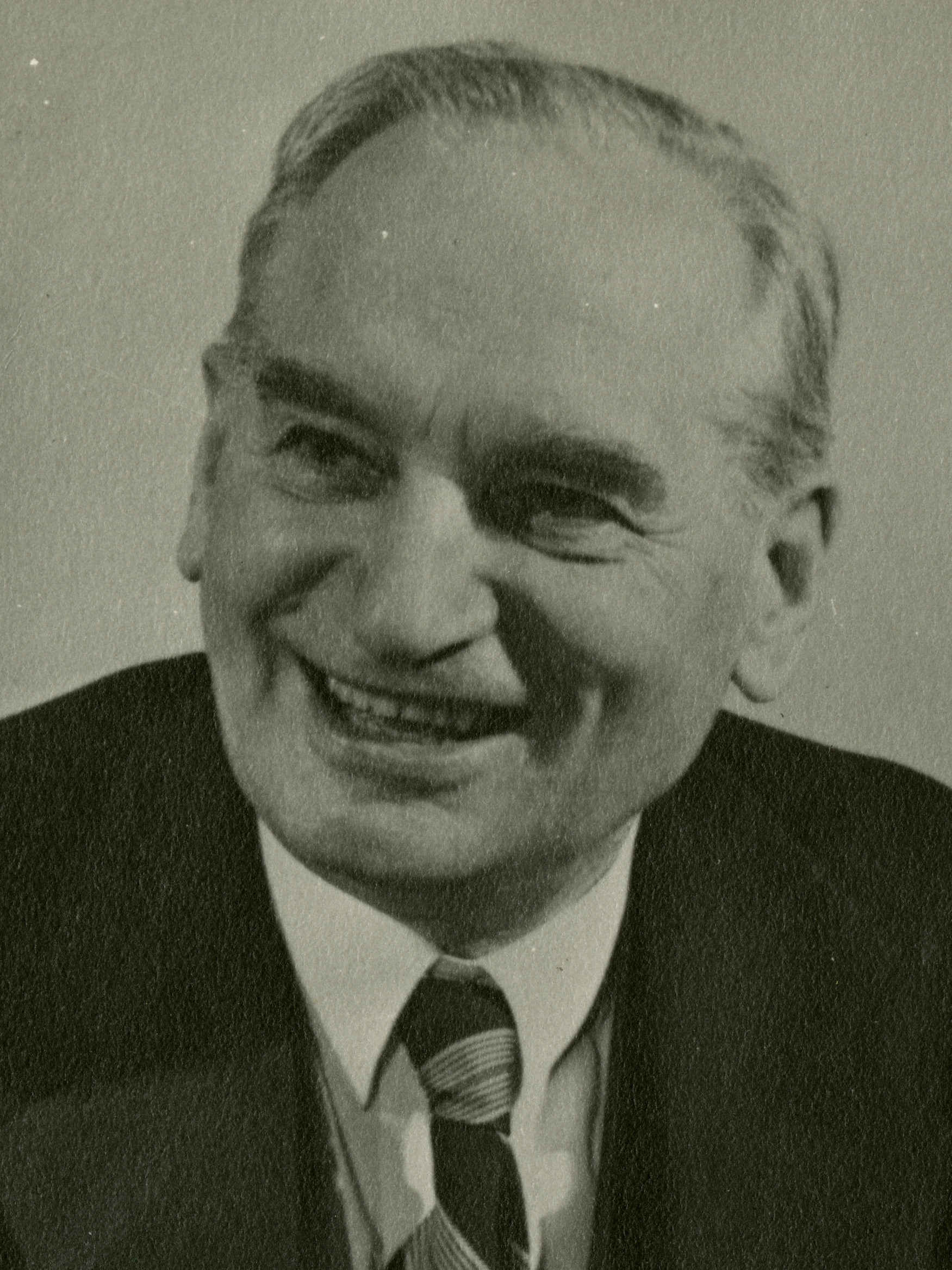

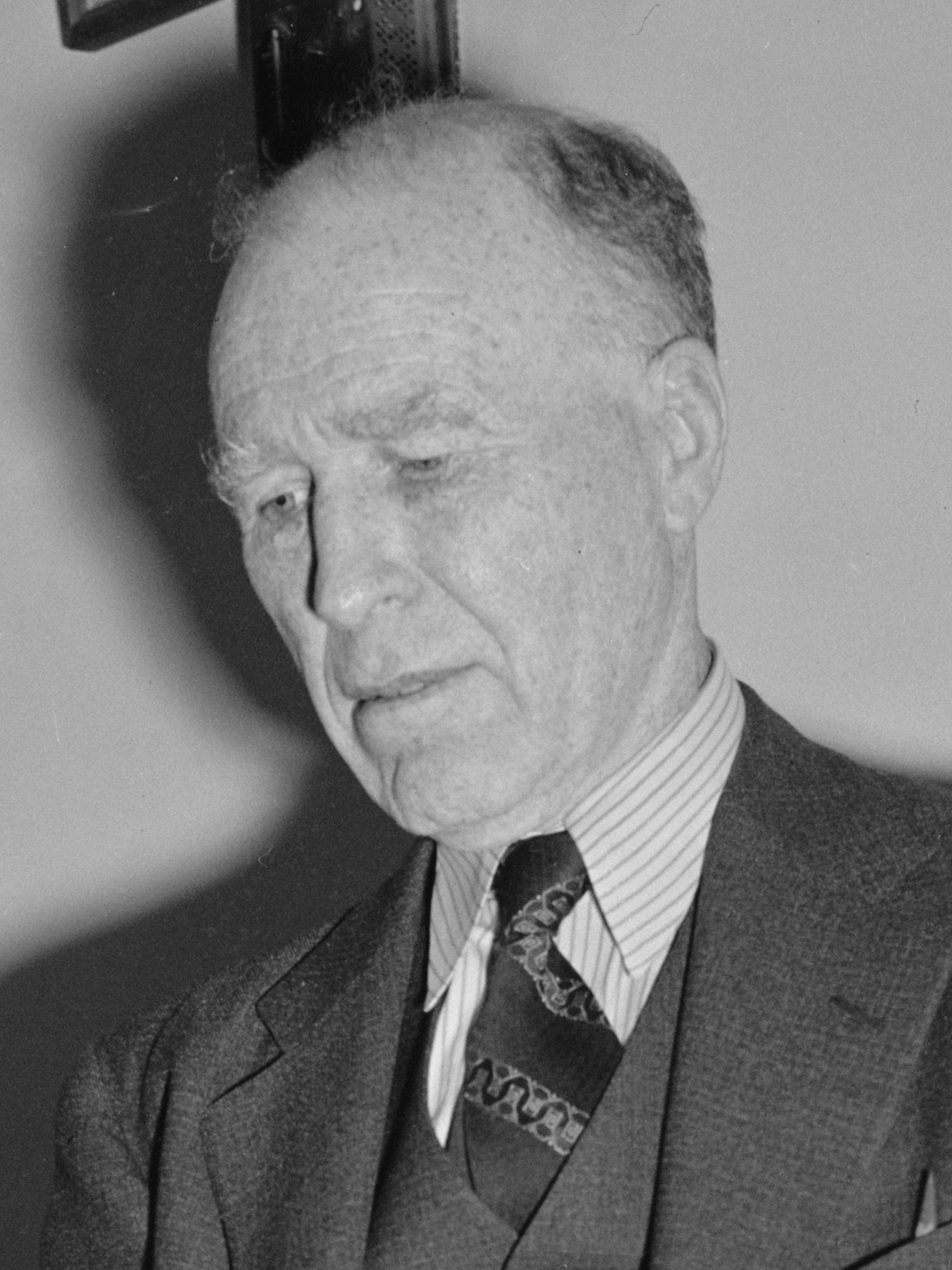

Nominee	William Langer	William Lemke	Charles J. Vogel
Party	Republican	Independent	Democratic
Popular vote	100,647	92,593	69,847
Percentage	38.11%	35.06%	26.45%
- County results Langer: 30–40% 40–50% 50–60% 60–70% Lemke: 30–40% 40–50% Vogel: 30–40% 40–50%
U.S. senator before election
Lynn Frazier
Republican
Elected U.S. Senator
William Langer
Republican

The 1940 United States Senate election in North Dakota took place on November 5, 1940. Incumbent Republican Senator Lynn Frazier, who was first elected in 1922, ran for re-election to a fourth term. However, he was defeated in the Republican primary by former Governor William Langer. In the general election, Langer faced Democratic nominee Charles J. Vogel, an attorney, and Congressman William Lemke, who was running as an independent. In a close race, Langer narrowly defeated Lemke with a 38% plurality and won his first term in the Senate.

== Democratic primary ==
=== Candidates ===
- Charles J. Vogel, Fargo attorney
- E. A. Johansson

=== Results ===
Democratic primary results
Party	Candidate	Votes	%
Democratic	Charles J. Vogel	21,359	67.36%
Democratic	E. A. Johansson	10,352	32.64%
Total votes		31,711	100.00%

== Republican primary ==
=== Candidates ===
- William Langer, former Governor of North Dakota
- Lynn Frazier, incumbent U.S. Senator
- Thomas E. Whelan, State Senator

=== Results ===
Republican primary results
Party	Candidate	Votes	%
Republican	William Langer	61,538	40.42%
Republican	Lynn Frazier (inc.)	48,441	31.82%
Republican	Thomas E. Whelan	42,271	27.76%
Total votes		152,250	100.00%

== General election ==
=== Results ===
1940 United States Senate election in North Dakota
Party	Candidate	Votes	%	±%
Republican	William Langer	100,647	38.11%	−20.13%
Independent	William Lemke	92,593	35.06%	—
Democratic	Charles J. Vogel	69,847	26.45%	−13.80%
Independent	Jasper Haaland	1,014	0.38%	—
Majority		8,054	3.05%	−14.95%
Turnout		259,607		
Republican hold				
