= 1916 North Dakota gubernatorial election =

- November 7, 1916
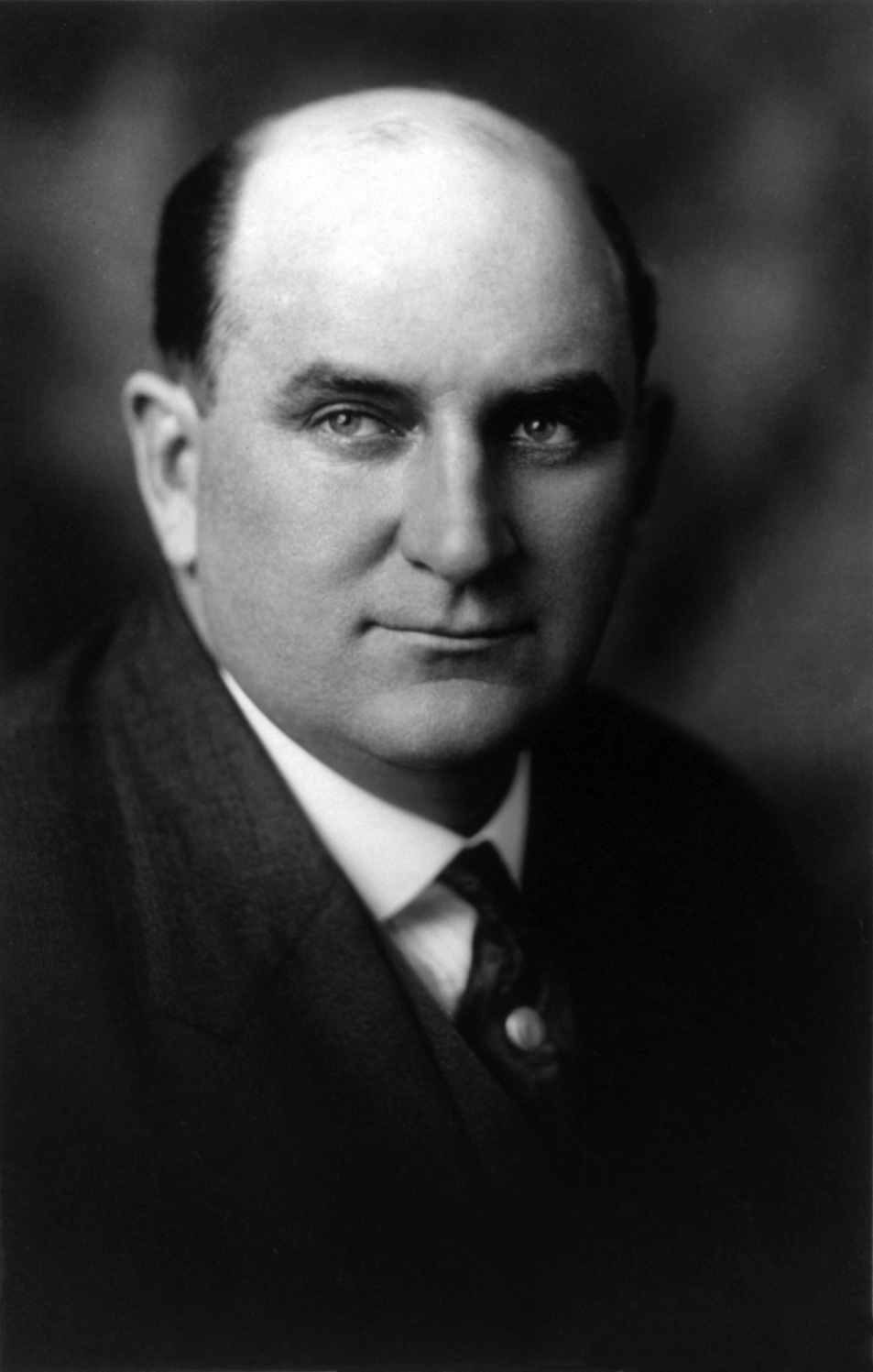

Nominee	Lynn Frazier	D. H. McArthur
Party	Republican	Democratic
Alliance	Nonpartisan League
Popular vote	87,665	20,351
Percentage	79.24%	18.40%
- County results Frazier: 60–70% 70–80% 80–90% >90%
Governor before election
L. B. Hanna
Republican
Elected Governor
Lynn Frazier
Republican

The 1916 North Dakota gubernatorial election was held on November 7, 1916. Republican nominee Lynn Frazier defeated Democratic nominee D. H. McArthur with 79.24% of the vote.

== Primary elections ==
Primary elections were held on June 28, 1916.

=== Democratic primary ===
==== Candidates ====
- D. H. McArthur
- L. H. Platou
- Halvor L. Halvorson, former President of the Minot City Commission

==== Results ====
Democratic primary results
Party	Candidate	Votes	%
Democratic	D. H. McArthur	4,279	37.47
Democratic	L. H. Platou	3,679	32.21
Democratic	Halvor L. Halvorson	3,462	30.32
Total votes		11,420	100.00

=== Republican primary ===
==== Candidates ====
- Lynn Frazier, farmer
- Usher L. Burdick, former Lieutenant Governor
- John H. Fraine, incumbent Lieutenant Governor
- George J. Smith

==== Results ====
Republican primary results
Party	Candidate	Votes	%
Republican	Lynn Frazier	39,246	52.07
Republican	Usher L. Burdick	23,362	31.00
Republican	John H. Fraine	9,780	12.98
Republican	George J. Smith	2,981	3.96
Total votes		75,369	100.00

== General election ==
=== Candidates ===
Major party candidates

- Lynn Frazier, Republican
- D. H. McArthur, Democratic

Other candidates

- Oscar A. Johnson, Socialist

=== Results ===
1916 North Dakota gubernatorial election
Party	Candidate	Votes	%	±%
Republican	Lynn Frazier	87,665	79.24	▲29.66
Democratic	D. H. McArthur	20,351	18.40	▼20.51
Socialist	Oscar A. Johnson	2,615	2.36	▼4.38
Majority		67,314	60.84	▲50.17
Total votes		110,631	100.00	
Republican hold				
