= Buckshot Hoffner =

American politician

Minority Leader of the North Dakota Senate
- In office 1975–1981
- Preceded by: L. D. Christensen
- Succeeded by: Rolland W. Redlin

Personal details
- Born: Sebastian Fabian Hoffner; January 20, 1924 Esmond, North Dakota, U.S.
- Died: December 17, 2015 (aged 91) Bismarck, North Dakota, U.S.
- Party: Democratic-NPL (from 1956); Nonpartisan League (until 1956)
- Spouse: Patricia Alger (m. 1946; died 2008)
- Profession: historian/farmer

Sebastian Fabian "Buckshot" Hoffner (January 20, 1924 – December 17, 2015) was an American politician who was a member of the North Dakota House of Representatives and North Dakota Senate for 18 years in total, amid unsuccessful runs for state-wide office and serving as chairman of the Nonpartisan League.

Born and raised in Esmond, North Dakota, Hoffner's early life was marked by service to his country as a World War II veteran. In addition to his political career, he was known for his cultural initiatives, including co-founding Buckstop Junction, a pioneer town museum near Bismarck, North Dakota.

Hoffner's political tenure included three distinct periods of service in the North Dakota House of Representatives: 1962 to 1966, 1968 to 1972, and 1983 to 1984. During his first stint, he ascended to the position of the House's minority leader in the 1971 session. He served in the Senate from 1972 to 1980 and held that chamber's minority leader's post from 1975 to 1980. Throughout, Hoffner served with the Democratic Party.

Hoffner had less success in state-wide politics. He was unsuccessful in his bid for the United States House of Representatives in 1966, falling short against incumbent 1st District Representative Mark Andrews. His attempts to secure the role of North Dakota Agriculture Commissioner in 1980 and the Democratic nomination for Governor of North Dakota in 1984 were also unsuccessful. He was the last elected state Chairman of the Nonpartisan League, overseeing its successful merger with the North Dakota Democratic Party to form the modern Democratic NPL.

Hoffner died in Bismarck, North Dakota on December 17, 2015.
