= 1921 North Dakota gubernatorial recall election =

Recall election in US state

- October 28, 1921
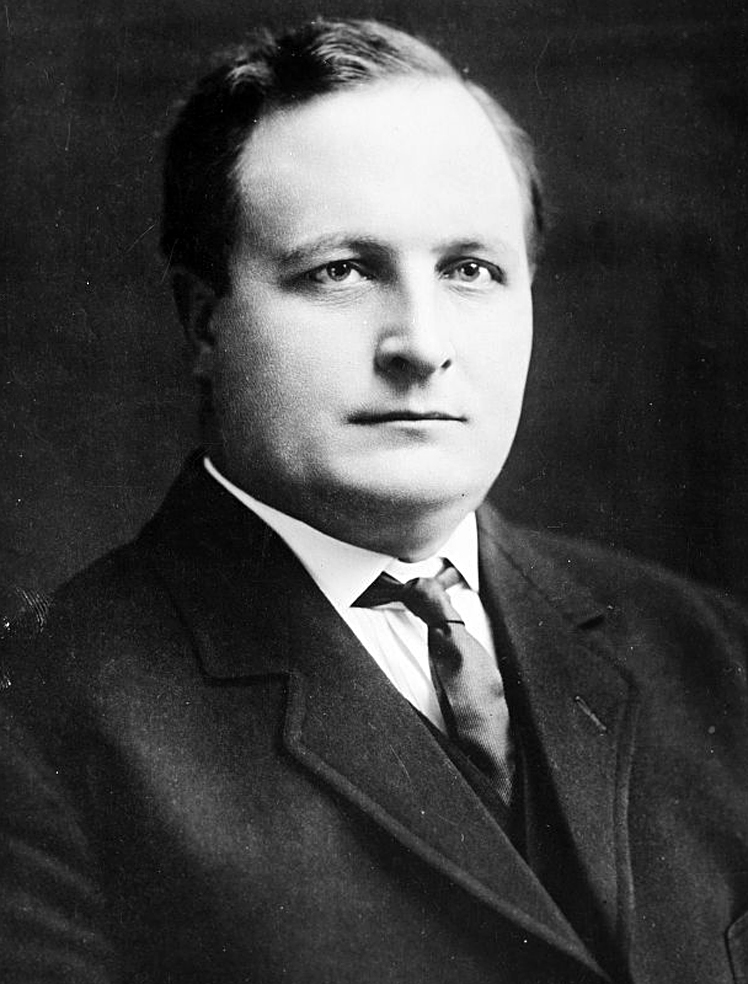

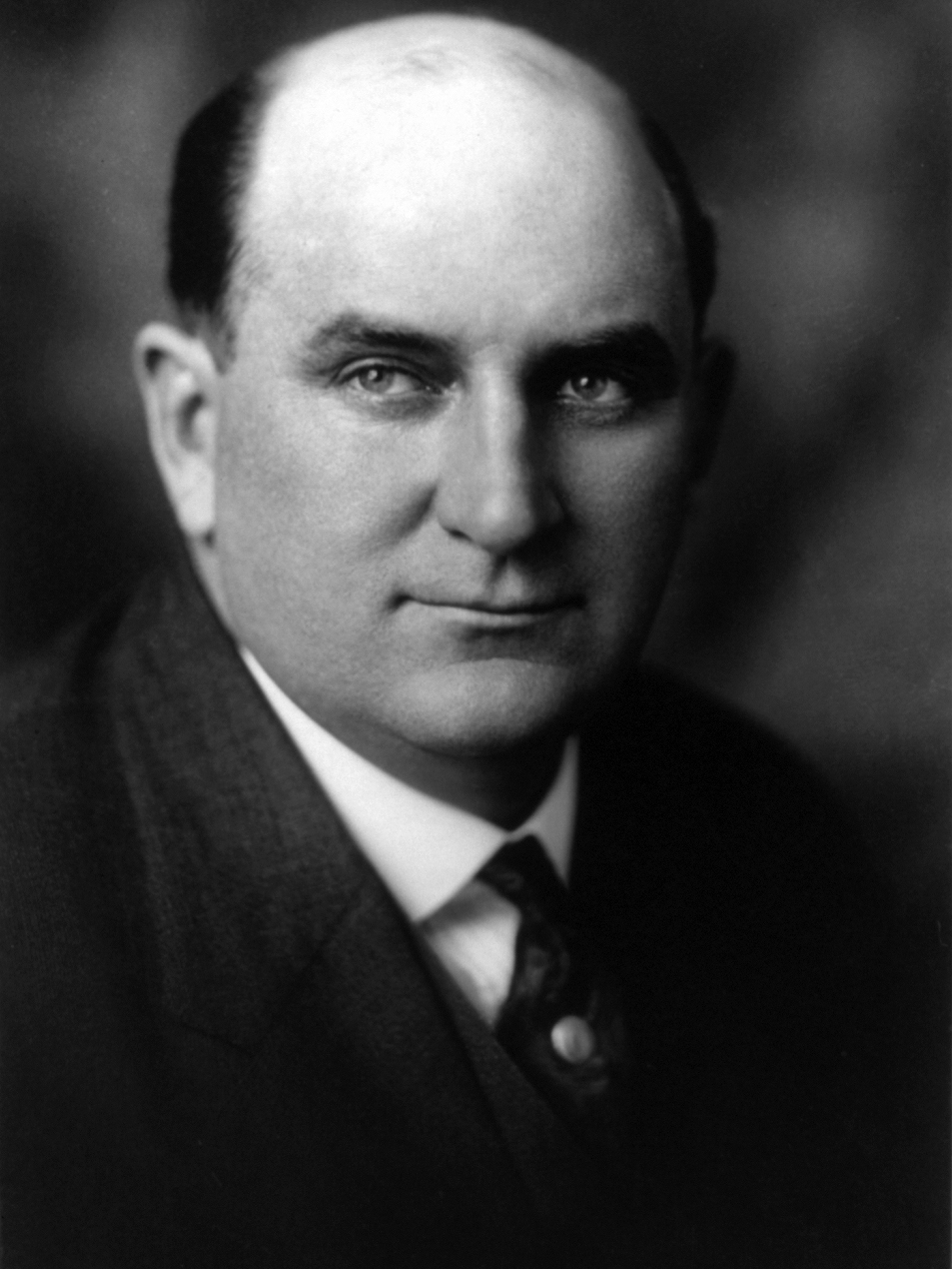
Nominee	Ragnvald Nestos	Lynn Frazier
Party	Republican/IVA	Nonpartisan League
Popular vote	111,425	107,332
Percentage	50.94%	49.06%
- County results Nestos: 50–60% 60–70% Frazier: 50–60% 60–70% 70–80%
Governor before election
Lynn Frazier
Non-Partisan League
Elected Governor
Ragnvald A. Nestos
Republican/IVA

The 1921 North Dakota gubernatorial recall election was a recall election of North Dakota Governor Lynn Frazier in 1921. Frazier was the first U.S. governor ever successfully recalled from office; there would not be another successful recall of a governor until California Governor Gray Davis was recalled in 2003.

== Background ==
The recall stemmed from the conflict between the socialist-leaning Nonpartisan League, of which Governor Frazier was a member, and the Independent Voters Association, a conservative and ‘pro-free market’ faction. Frazier and his party supported state ownership of industries, while the IVA opposed it. A dispute broke out specifically over government ownership of the Bank of North Dakota and State Mill and Elevator.

By September, the campaigners had been able to gather 73,000 names on petitions asking for the recall of Frazier, Attorney General William Lemke, and Commissioner of Agriculture John Hagan. These men made up the Industrial Commission, which acts as a board of directors for the state-owned entities. The date of the recall was set for October 28, 1921.

== Results ==
North Dakota gubernatorial election, 1921
Party	Candidate	Votes	%
Republican/IVA	Ragnvald A. Nestos	111,425	50.9
Non-Partisan League	Lynn Frazier (incumbent)	107,332	49.1
Margin of victory		4,093	1.8
Total votes		218,757	100
Republican/IVA gain from Non-Partisan League			

In the October 28 vote, Ragnvald A. Nestos was elected as governor by a margin of 4,093. He was sworn in on November 23.

== See also ==
- 1978 Cleveland mayoral recall election
- 2003 California gubernatorial recall election
- 2012 Wisconsin gubernatorial recall election
- 2021 California gubernatorial recall election
