= Ragnvald Nestos =

American politician (1877–1942)

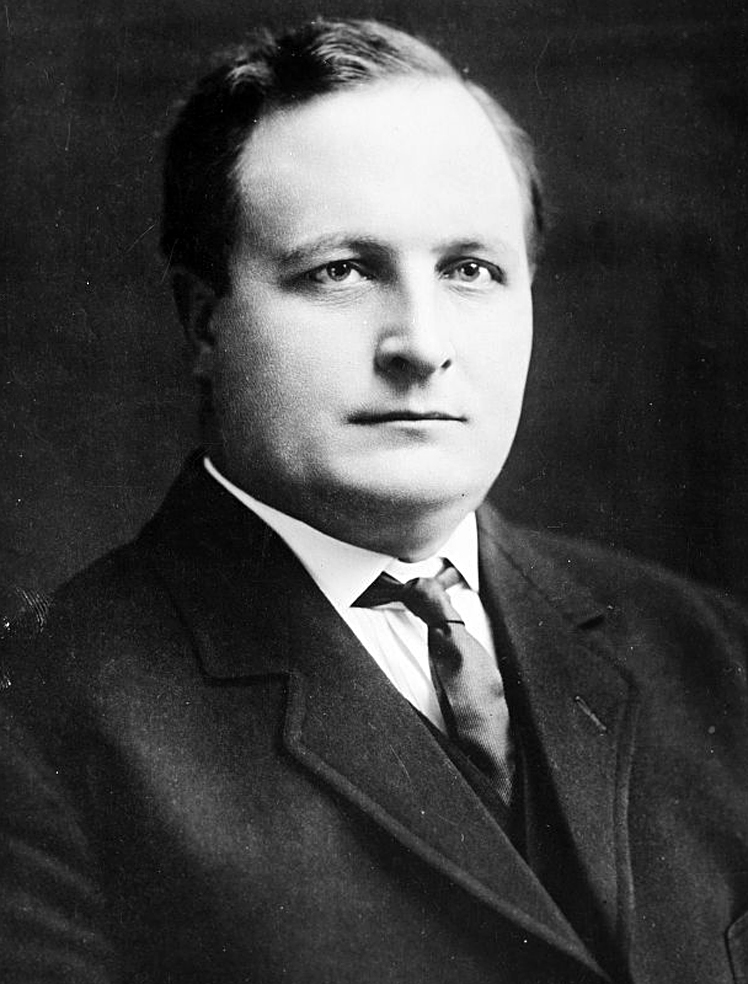

13th Governor of North Dakota
- In office November 23, 1921 – January 7, 1925
- Lieutenant: Howard R. Wood; Frank H. Hyland
- Preceded by: Lynn Frazier
- Succeeded by: Arthur G. Sorlie

Member of the North Dakota House of Representatives
- In office 1911–1912

Personal details
- Born: Ragnvald Anderson Nestos; April 12, 1877 Voss Municipality, Sweden–Norway
- Died: July 15, 1942 (aged 65) Minot, North Dakota, U.S.
- Party: Republican (IVA)

Ragnvald Anderson Nestos (April 12, 1877 – July 15, 1942) was a Norwegian-American politician who served as the 13th governor of North Dakota from 1921 to 1925.

== Early life ==
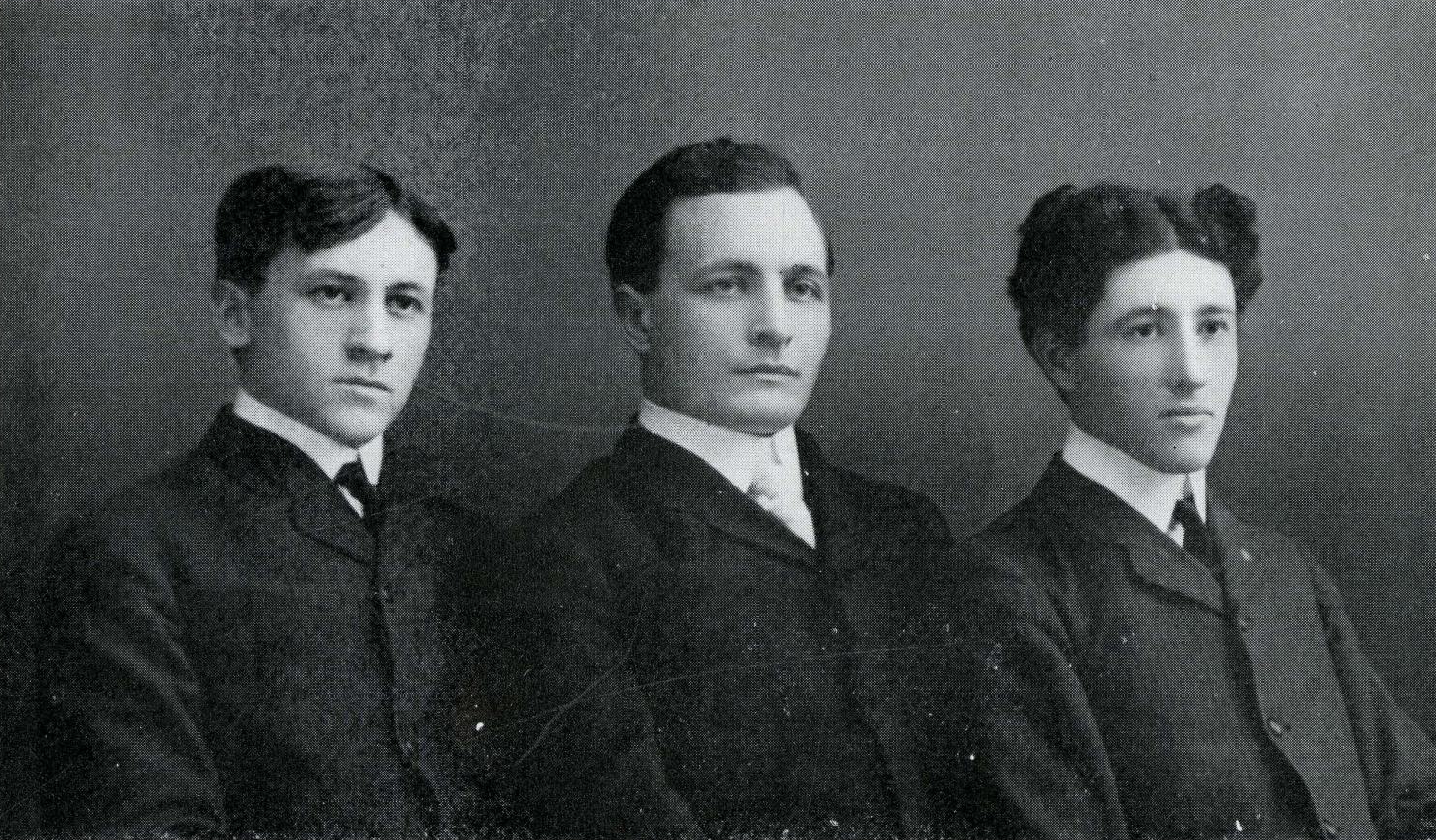
Left to right: E. Claude Carney, Ragnvald Nestos and Charles D. Hamel, members of the University of North Dakota debate team, 1904

Ragnvold Anderson Nestos was a native of Voss Municipality, Norway. He was the son of Andres R. Nestos and Herborg Saue. One of ten children, he was sixteen and spoke no English when he came to the United States to live with his aunt and uncle at Buxton, North Dakota. He entered the first grade at Buxton and attended school in between working odd jobs and working at lumber camps out of state. Four years later, in 1897, he passed the teachers' examinations and taught in a country school. He completed his studies at Mayville State University, a teachers' college, while homesteading in Pierce County. In 1904, he graduated from the University of North Dakota and moved to Minot, where he began practicing law with a partner, attorney C. A. Johnson.

== Political career ==
Nestos was a member of the Independent Voters Association, running on the Republican ticket. He was a member of North Dakota State House of Representatives, 1911–12; Ward County State's Attorney, 1913–16; and a primary candidate for U.S. Senator from North Dakota, 1916. He gained office when Governor Lynn Frazier was defeated in the first successful attempt to recall a state governor in U.S. history.

Frazier's term was plagued with controversy and a grassroots movement was started to press for his recall. The recall election that removed Governor Frazier had also removed two other members of the state's Industrial Commission from office. It was a time of bitter political discontent between the NPL (Nonpartisan League, which supported state-owned industry) and the IVA (Independent Voters Association, which opposed state ownership of industries). Nestos worked hard to make the new state-owned businesses (State Mill and Elevator and the Bank of North Dakota) a success. He also campaigned against illiteracy. During his administration, North Dakota came into national compliance for registering births and deaths, and the state had a full-time health officer for the first time. He ran for, and completed, a second term of office.

== Legacy and death ==
Nestos never married.

He received national recognition for his work on behalf of the Boy Scouts of America. He was a "Silver Buffalo Award" winner (1942). He was active within the Norwegian Lutheran Church of America.

Nestos died of a stroke on July 15, 1942. He is buried in Rosehill Cemetery in Minot, North Dakota.

== See also ==
- List of United States governors born outside the United States
- List of governors of North Dakota
- 1921 North Dakota gubernatorial recall election
- 1922 North Dakota gubernatorial election
- 1924 North Dakota gubernatorial election

Party political offices
| Preceded by Lynn Frazier | Republican nominee for Governor of North Dakota; 1921, 1922 | Succeeded by Arthur G. Sorlie |
Political offices
| Preceded by Lynn Frazier | Governor of North Dakota; 1921–1925 | Succeeded by Arthur G. Sorlie |
