= North Dakota Industrial Commission =

- Seal of North Dakota, used by the Industrial Commission when operating as a whole

Commission overview
- Formed: 1919
- Jurisdiction: Government of North Dakota
- Headquarters: North Dakota State Capitol, Bismarck, North Dakota; 46.821°N 100.783°W
- Commission executive: Kelly Armstrong, Governor of North Dakota
- Website: www.nd.gov/ndic/

The North Dakota Industrial Commission is the body that oversees the management of several separate programs and resources, including the Bank of North Dakota, North Dakota Mill and Elevator, and the Department of Mineral Resources. By law, it has three members: the Attorney General, the Agriculture Commissioner, and the Governor, who acts as chair.

== History ==
The North Dakota Industrial Commission, a product of the Nonpartisan League (NPL), was established by the Legislature in 1919 to oversee the utilities, industries, enterprises, and business projects owned and operated by the state. Since its inception, the Industrial Commission has been composed of the Attorney General, Agriculture Commissioner, and the Governor, serving as chair.

== Areas of responsibility ==
=== Bank of North Dakota ===
The Bank of North Dakota is a state-owned-run financial institution. The president of the Bank reports to the Industrial Commission, who oversee the bank alongside a separate advisory board appointed by the governor.

=== Building Authority ===
The North Dakota Building Authority finances and manages the real estate used by the State of North Dakota. By statute, the Industrial Commission also acts as the Building Authority.

=== Department of Mineral Resources ===
The North Dakota Department of Mineral Resources houses both the North Dakota Geological Survey, which provides geological and geographical information to the legislature, other state agencies, and to the general public, and the Oil and Gas Division, which regulates the extraction of those resources within the state. The Industrial Commission oversees the department, whose director is appointed by the Governor.

=== Housing Finance Agency ===
The North Dakota Housing Finance Agency provides financial assistance and economic incentives to homebuyers within the state, including special assistance to low-income and first-time homebuyers. It also oversees United States Department of Housing and Urban Development programs within the state. The Industrial Commission oversees this agency.

=== Lignite Research, Development and Marketing Program ===
The North Dakota Lignite Research, Development, and Marketing Program is a fund that provides for the research, development, and marketing of North Dakota's lignite coal resources. It is administered by the Industrial Commission, under advisement from the Lignite Research Council, a group of public and private sector experts appointed by the Governor.

=== Mill and Elevator ===
The North Dakota Mill and Elevator Association is a company owned by the State of North Dakota and overseen by the Industrial Commission that owns the largest flour mill in the United States. By statute, all capital and operating expenses are paid for by the association's revenues, after which 75% of all net profits are added to the state's general fund.

=== Oil and Gas Research Program ===
The Oil and Gas Research Program is a public fund that exists to promote the interests of the energy industry in North Dakota. The North Dakota Legislative Assembly appropriates money for the Oil and Gas Research Fund, which is administered by the Industrial Commission based on recommendations made by the Oil and Gas Research Council. The Council has eight members—seven industry representatives and one commissioner from an oil producing county—all of whom are appointed by the governor. The director of Department of Mineral Resources Oil and Gas Division and the State Geologist both advise the board as ex-officio nonvoting members.

=== Pipeline Authority ===
The Pipeline Authority was created in 2007 to facilitate the development of oil and gas pipelines in North Dakota. By law, the Industrial Commission acts as this body.
