= Lynn Frazier =

American politician (1874–1947)

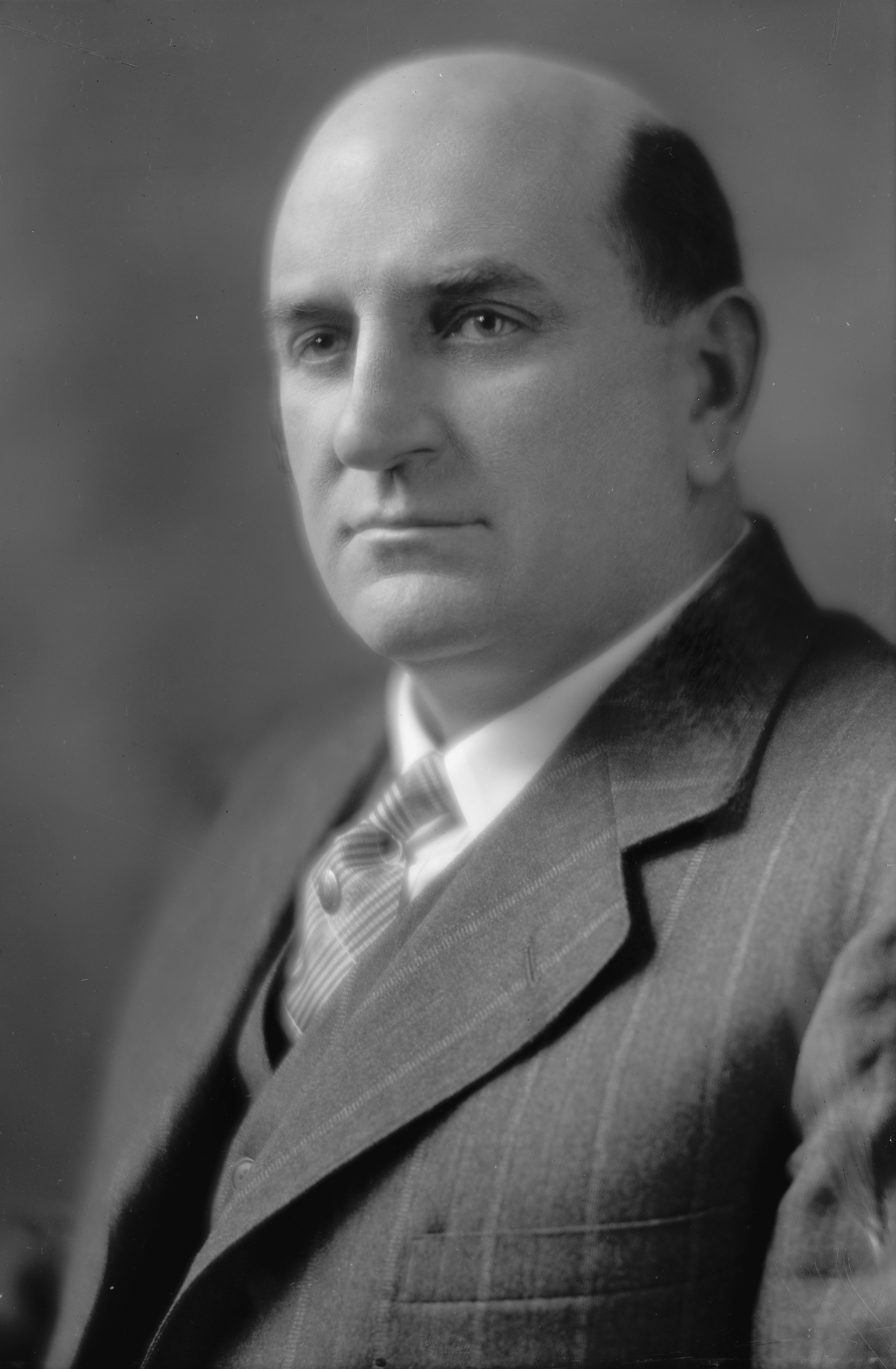
- Portrait by Harris & Ewing c. 1923–1941

United States Senator from North Dakota
- In office March 4, 1923 – January 3, 1941
- Preceded by: Porter J. McCumber
- Succeeded by: William Langer

12th Governor of North Dakota
- In office January 3, 1917 – November 23, 1921
- Lieutenant: Anton Kraabel; Howard R. Wood
- Preceded by: L. B. Hanna
- Succeeded by: Ragnvald Nestos

Personal details
- Born: Lynn Joseph Frazier; December 21, 1874 Medford, Minnesota, U.S.
- Died: January 11, 1947 (aged 72) Riverdale, Maryland, U.S.
- Party: Republican (NPL faction)
- Spouses: Lottie Stafford (m. 1903; died 1935) Cathrine Behrens Paulson (m. 1937)
- Education: Mayville State University; University of North Dakota (BA)

Lynn Joseph Frazier (December 21, 1874 – January 11, 1947) was an American educator and politician who served as the 12th governor of North Dakota from 1917 until being recalled in 1921 and later served as a U.S. senator from North Dakota from 1923 to 1941. He was the first American governor ever successfully recalled from office. The only other American governor to ever be recalled is Gray Davis, who was recalled in 2003.

== Early life ==
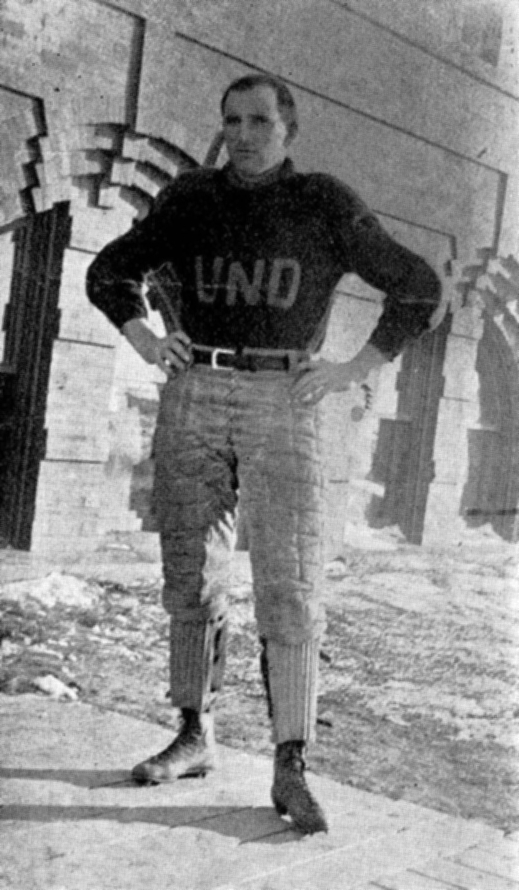
Frazier as captain of the University of North Dakota football team c. 1899–1900

Frazier was born in Medford, Minnesota. His family moved to North Dakota when he was six years old. He graduated from Grafton High School in 1892, and Mayville Normal School in 1895. He completed his bachelor's degree at the University of North Dakota and graduated with honors. Prior to his career in state and national politics, Frazier was a farmer and school teacher.

Frazier intended to become a doctor, but the unexpected deaths of his father and brother forced him to take over the family farm.

== Career ==
After winning the Republican primary as the Nonpartisan League candidate, Frazier was elected Governor in 1916 with 79% of the vote.

For a time, Frazier was extremely popular and implemented several reforms, such as establishing the Bank of North Dakota and the North Dakota Mill and Elevator, which stand today as a lasting legacy of the Nonpartisan League.

During the 1919 national coal strike, Governor Frazier took a unique approach to the strike. He declared martial law, took over the mines with United Mine Workers of America contracts and ran them in cooperation with the union.

He was re-elected twice, in 1918 and 1920, but an economic depression hit the agricultural sector during his third term and resulted in a successful private-business-led grassroots movement to press for his recall. In 1921, Frazier was the first governor to be successfully removed from office. Independent Voters Association member Ragnvald Nestos was elected to his place.

After the recall, Frazier was elected in 1922 to the U.S. Senate, again as the NPL candidate on the Republican ticket. He served until losing a bid for re-election in 1940, when he was unseated in the Republican primary by William Langer.

== Personal life ==
Frazier was twice married, to Lottie J. Stafford, with whom he had five children, from November 26, 1903, until her death on January 14, 1935, and to Catherine Paulson, whom he married in 1937.

== Death and legacy ==
Frazier died in Riverdale, Maryland, on January 11, 1947, at the age of 72. He is buried in Hoople Cemetery, Hoople, North Dakota.

Governor Frazier is portrayed in the 1984 Nebraska Public TV documentary Plowing up a Storm.

== See also ==
- 1916 North Dakota gubernatorial election
- 1918 North Dakota gubernatorial election
- 1920 North Dakota gubernatorial election
- 1921 North Dakota gubernatorial recall election
- 1922 United States Senate election in North Dakota

Party political offices
Preceded by L. B. Hanna	Republican nominee for Governor of North Dakota; 1916, 1918, 1920	Succeeded by Ragnvald Nestos
First	Nonpartisan League nominee for Governor of North Dakota; 1921	Succeeded by William Lemke
Preceded by Porter J. McCumber	Republican nominee for U.S. Senator from North Dakota (Class 1); 1922, 1928, 1934	Succeeded by William Langer
Political offices
Preceded by L. B. Hanna	Governor of North Dakota; 1917–1921	Succeeded by Ragnvald A. Nestos
U.S. Senate
Preceded by Porter J. McCumber	U.S. Senator (Class 1) from North Dakota; 1923–1941; Served alongside: Edwin F. Ladd, Gerald Nye	Succeeded by William Langer
Preceded by John W. Harreld	Chair of the Senate Indian Affairs Committee; 1927–1933	Succeeded by Burton K. Wheeler
