= Independent Voters Association =

Political organization in North Dakota, US

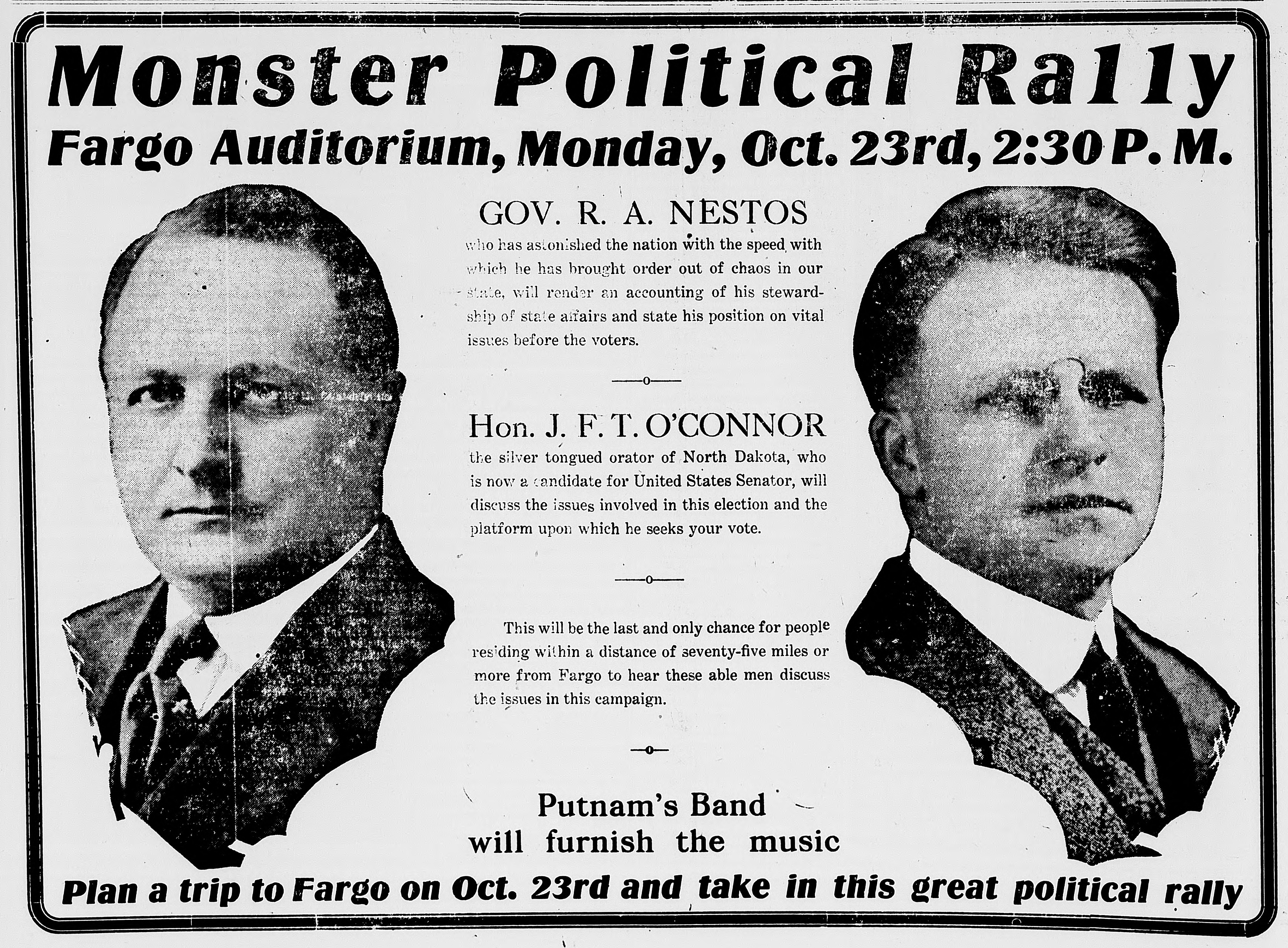
Newspaper advertisement for a "monster political rally" in Fargo featuring governor Ragnvald Nestos and James Francis Thaddeus O'Connor, 1922

The Independent Voters Association, or IVA, was a political organization in North Dakota, United States. The IVA was a conservative, capitalist faction created to counter the socialist leanings of the Nonpartisan League (NPL).

The IVA formed on May 1, 1918, at the height of the NPL's influence on the North Dakota Republican Party. Its leading founder was E. W. Everson, who had served from 1913 to 1918 in the North Dakota State House of Representatives. As the NPL went into decline during the 1940s, most of the goals of the IVA had been met, and it eventually disbanded. Its most notable success was the 1921 North Dakota gubernatorial recall election, which resulted in Ragnvald Nestos replacing Lynn Frazier as Governor of North Dakota.

== See also ==
- Politics of North Dakota
- Political party strength in North Dakota
