= 1922 United States Senate election in North Dakota =

- November 7, 1922
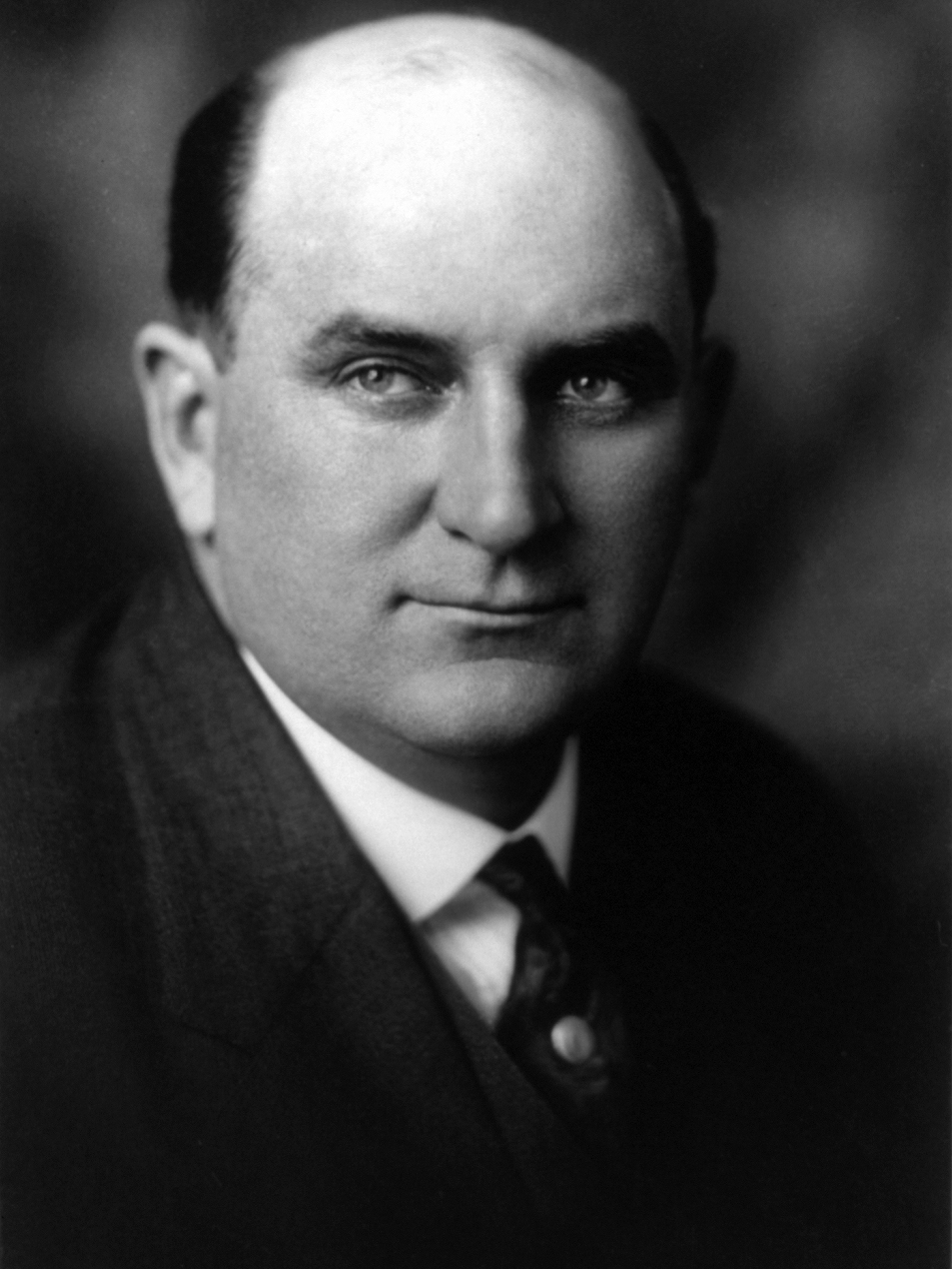

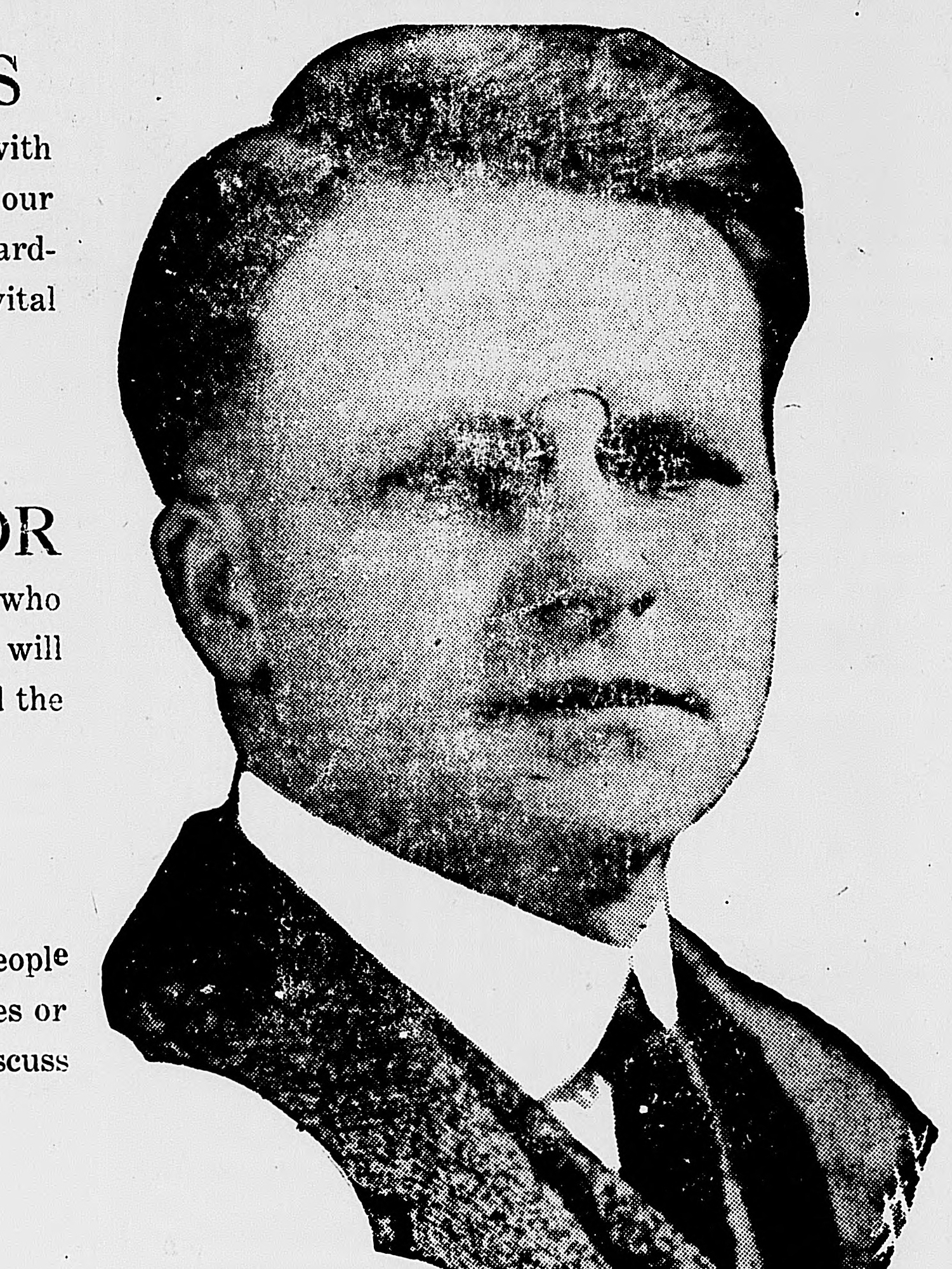
Nominee	Lynn Frazier	James Francis Thaddeus O'Connor
Party	Republican	Democratic
Popular vote	101,312	92,464
Percentage	52.28%	47.72%
- County results Frazier: 50–60% 60–70% 70–80% 80–90% O'Connor: 50–60% 60–70%
U.S. senator before election
Porter J. McCumber
Republican
Elected U.S. Senator
Lynn Frazier
Republican

The 1922 United States Senate election in North Dakota took place on November 7, 1922. Incumbent Republican Senator Porter J. McCumber sought re-election, but was defeated in the Republican primary by Lynn Frazier, the former Governor of North Dakota, who had been recalled in 1921. In the general election, Frazier faced former State Representative James Francis Thaddeus O'Connor, the Democratic nominee. Even as Republicans did poorly nationwide, Frazier narrowly defeated O'Connor to hold the seat.

== Democratic primary ==
=== Candidates ===
- James Francis Thaddeus O'Connor, former State Representative
- Frank O. Hellstrom, former Warden of the North Dakota State Penitentiary, 1912 and 1914 Democratic nominee for Governor

=== Results ===
Democratic primary results
Party	Candidate	Votes	%
Democratic	James Francis Thaddeus O'Connor	9,140	78.08%
Democratic	Frank O. Hellstrom	2,566	21.92%
Total votes		11,706	100.00%

== Republican primary ==
=== Candidates ===
- Lynn Frazier, former Governor of North Dakota
- Porter J. McCumber, incumbent U.S. Senator
- Ormsby McHarg, former private secretary to Senator McCumber

=== Results ===
Republican primary results
Party	Candidate	Votes	%
Republican	Lynn Frazier	91,387	51.49%
Republican	Porter J. McCumber (inc.)	80,821	45.54%
Republican	Ormsby McHarg	5,263	2.97%
Total votes		177,471	100.00%

== General election ==
=== Results ===
1922 United States Senate election in North Dakota
Party	Candidate	Votes	%	±%
Republican	Lynn Frazier	101,312	52.28%	−1.57%
Democratic	James Francis Thaddeus O'Connor	92,464	47.72%	+9.47%
Majority		8,848	4.57%	−11.04%
Turnout		193,776		
Republican hold				
