= Nonpartisan League =

1900s North Dakota political organization

North Dakota Nonpartisan League
- Leader: Arthur C. Townley
- Founded: 1915
- Dissolved: 1956
- Preceded by: Socialist Party of North Dakota
- Merged into: North Dakota Democratic–Nonpartisan League Party (Insurgents); North Dakota Republican Party (Old Guard)
- Headquarters: Patterson Hotel, Bismarck
- Ideology: Left-wing populism Social democracy Socialism; Agrarian socialism Laborism; Agrarianism; Localism; Progressivism; State ownership Women's suffrage
- Political position: Left-wing
- National affiliation: Socialist Party of America

The Nonpartisan League (NPL) was a left-wing political party founded in 1915 in North Dakota by Arthur C. Townley, a former organizer for the Socialist Party of America. On behalf of small farmers and merchants, the Nonpartisan League advocated state control of mills, grain elevators, banks, and other farm-related industries in order to reduce the power of corporate and political interests from Minneapolis and Chicago.

The League adopted the goat as a mascot; it promoted the slogan "The Goat that Can't Be Got".

== History ==
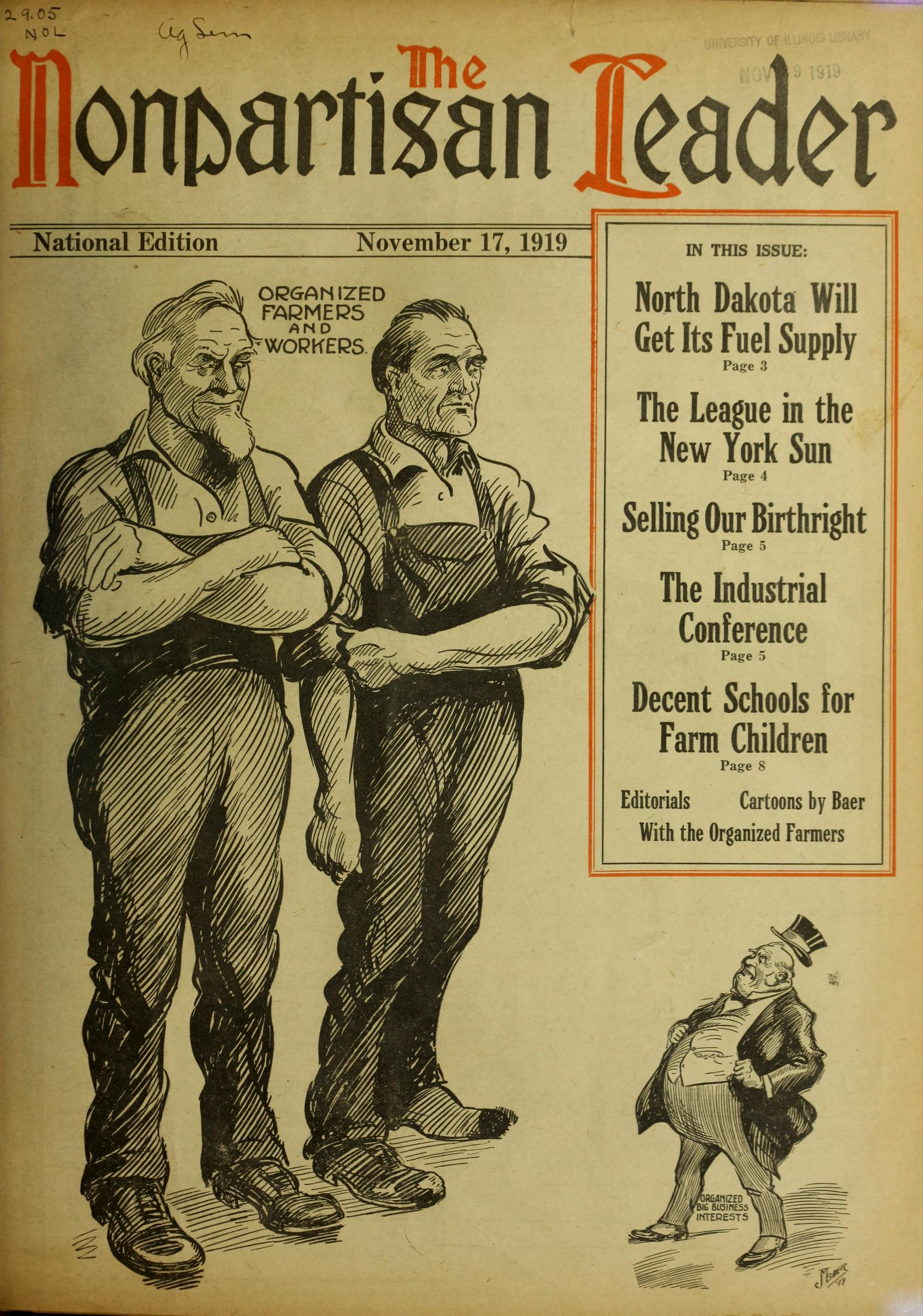
1919 cover of the League's newspaper, The Nonpartisan Leader, portraying organized farmers and workers standing tall against big business interests.

=== Origins ===
By the 1910s, the growth of left-wing sympathies was on the rise in North Dakota. The Socialist Party of North Dakota had considerable success. They brought in many outside speakers, including Eugene V. Debs, who spoke at a large antiwar rally at Garrison in 1915. By 1912, there were 175 Socialist politicians in the state. Rugby and Hillsboro elected Socialist mayors. The party had also established a weekly newspaper, the Iconoclast, in Minot.

In 1914, Arthur C. Townley, a flax farmer from Beach, North Dakota, and organizer for the Socialist Party of America, attended a meeting of the American Society of Equity. Afterwards, Townley and a friend, Frank B. Wood, drew up a radical political platform that addressed many of the farmers' concerns, and created the Farmers Non-Party League Organization, which later evolved into the Nonpartisan League. Soon, Townley was traveling the state in a borrowed Ford Model T, signing up members for a payment of $6 in dues. Farmers were receptive to Townley's ideas and joined in droves. However, Townley was soon expelled from the Socialist Party due to this method of rogue operating.

=== Rapid growth ===
The League grew in 1915. At that time, small farmers in North Dakota felt exploited by out-of-state companies. One author later described the wheat-growing state as "a tributary province of Minneapolis-St. Paul." Minnesota banks made its loans, Minnesota millers handled its grain, and Alexander McKenzie, North Dakota's political boss, lived in Saint Paul, Minnesota. Rumors spread at a Society of Equity meeting in Bismarck that a state representative named Treadwell Twichell had told a group of farmers to "go home and slop the hogs." Twichell later said that his statement was misinterpreted. He had been instrumental in previous legislative reforms to rescue the state from boss rule by McKenzie and the Northern Pacific Railroad around the start of the 20th century.

=== Rise to power in North Dakota ===
Proposing that the state of North Dakota create its own bank, warehouses, and factories, the League was supported by a populist groundswell. It ran its slate as Republican Party candidates in the 1916 elections. In the gubernatorial election, farmer Lynn Frazier won with 79% of the vote. In 1917, John Miller Baer won a special election for the United States House of Representatives. In the 1918 elections, the NPL won full control of both houses of the state legislature.

The League politicians enacted a significant portion of its previous election platform. It established state-run agricultural enterprises such as the North Dakota Mill and Elevator, the Bank of North Dakota, and a state-owned railroad. The legislature also passed a statewide graduated income tax, which distinguished between earned and unearned income, authorized a state hail insurance fund, and established a workmen's compensation fund that assessed employers. The NPL also set up a Home Building Association, to aid people in financing and building houses.

During World War I, Townley demanded the "conscription of wealth", blaming "big-bellied, red-necked plutocrats" for the war. He and fellow party leader William Lemke received support for the League from isolationist German-Americans.

=== Depression and decline ===
The NPL's success was short-lived. After the war ended, commodity prices dropped and the West was struck by a drought. This caused an agricultural depression. As a result of the depression, the new state-owned industries ran into financial trouble, and the private banking industry, smarting from the loss of its influence in Bismarck, rebuffed the NPL when it tried to raise money through state-issued bonds. The industry said that the state bank and elevator were "theoretical experiments" that might easily fail. Moreover, the NPL's lack of governing experience led to perceived infighting and corruption. Newspapers and business groups portrayed the NPL as inept and disastrous for the state's future.

In 1918, opponents of the NPL formed the Independent Voters Association (IVA). In 1921, the IVA organized a recall election which successfully recalled Frazier as governor. Frazier lost the recall election by a margin of 1.8%, becoming the first U.S. state governor to be recalled. However, a year later he was elected in the 1922 United States Senate election in North Dakota, serving until 1940.

The 1920s were economically difficult for farmers, and the NPL's popularity receded. By 1922, the NPL had retreated from all other states except North Dakota.

=== Electoral survival and fusion with Democratic party ===
However, the populist undercurrent that fueled the NPL's meteoric growth revived with the coming of the Great Depression and Dust Bowl conditions of the 1930s. The NPL's William "Wild Bill" Langer was elected to the governorship in 1932 and 1936. Langer was later elected to the U.S. Senate, serving from 1940 until his death in 1959.

By 1950, two factions divided the traditionally left-wing NPL; on one side were the Insurgents, and on the other were the Old Guard. The Insurgents aligned liberally with pro-farmers' union, organized labor, and Democratic Party groups. The Insurgents wanted to merge the NPL with the North Dakota Democratic Party. In 1952 presidential race, the Insurgents formed the Volunteers for Stevenson Committee, to help elect Adlai Stevenson II, the governor of Illinois and Democratic nominee for president. The Old Guard, also known as the Capitol Crowd, were more conservative, anti-farmers' union, anti-labor, and pro-Republican segment of the league, these members wanted to keep the Nonpartisan League aligned with the Republican Party; they supported General Dwight D. Eisenhower. Over the following four years, legislative polarization grew and the Nonpartisan League eventually split in two. In 1956, the Nonpartisan League formally merged with the state Democratic Party, creating the North Dakota Democratic-Nonpartisan League Party, while some of the League's base stayed in the North Dakota Republican Party. The Democratic-Nonpartisan League Party introduced a unified slate of candidates for statewide offices and adopted a liberal platform that included the repeal of the Taft–Hartley Act, creation of a minimum wage of $1.25 an hour, and a graduated land tax on property worth $20,000 or more. In May 1956, the Democratic Convention accepted the Nonpartisan League's candidates and adopted its platform, fully unifying the two parties into one.

Although the Democrats were still in the minority in the state government, the number of Democrats in the state legislature increased greatly. Before the league moved into the Democratic Party, there were only five Democrats among the 162 members of both houses of the legislature in 1955. By 1957, the number grew to 28, and in 1959 the numbers continued to grow, reaching 67.

== Notable members ==
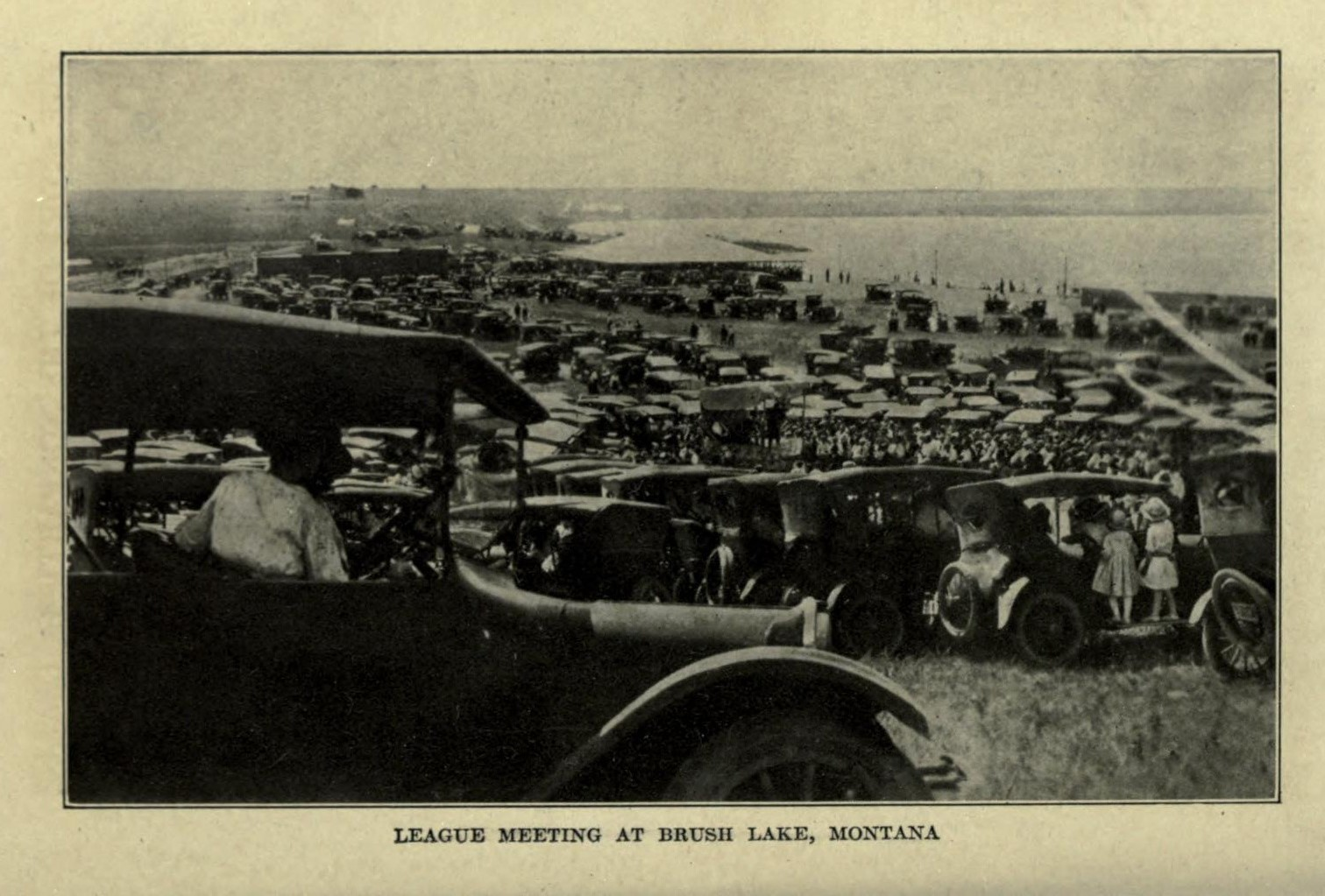
Nonpartisan League meeting at Brush Lake, Montana.

- United States Senators:
  - Edwin F. Ladd (1921–1925)
  - Lynn Frazier (1923–1941)
  - Gerald Nye (1925–1945)
  - William Langer (1941–1959)
- United States Representatives:
  - George M. Young (Note: Endorsed, but not a member.) (1913–1924)
  - John M. Baer (1917–1921)
  - James H. Sinclair (1919–1933)
  - Thomas Hall (1924–1933)
  - William Lemke (1933–1941, 1943–1950)
  - Usher L. Burdick (1935–1945, 1949–1959)
- Governors of North Dakota:
  - Lynn Frazier (1917–1921)
  - Arthur G. Sorlie (1925–1928)
  - Walter Maddock (1928–1929)
  - William Langer (1933–1934, 1937–1939)
  - Ole H. Olson (1934–1935)
  - Walter Welford (1935–1937)
- Lieutenant Governors of North Dakota:
  - Howard R. Wood (1919–1923)
  - Walter Maddock (1925–1928)
  - Ole H. Olson (1933–1934)
  - Walter Welford (1935)
  - Thorstein H. H. Thoresen (1937–1939)
  - Jack A. Patterson (1939–1941)
  - Oscar W. Hagen (1941–1943)
- North Dakota Attorneys General:
  - William Langer (1917–1920)
  - William Lemke (1921)
  - Arthur J. Gronna (1933)
  - Peter O. Sathre (1933–1937)
  - Alvin C. Strutz (1937–1944)
- North Dakota Secretaries of State:
  - Thomas Hall (1913–1924, 1943–1954)
  - Robert Byrne (1925-1934)
  - James D. Gronna (1935–1940)
- North Dakota Public Service Commissioner:
  - Ben C. Larkin (1941–1949)
- North Dakota State Treasurers:
  - Obert A. Olson (1919–1920)
  - Berta E. Baker (1929–1932)
  - Alfred S. Dale (1933–1934)
  - John R. Omland (1939–1940)
- North Dakota State Auditors:
  - Carl R. Kositzky (1917–1920)
  - David C. Poindexter (1921–1924)
  - Berta E. Baker (1935–1956)
- North Dakota Superintendent of Public Instruction:
  - Neil C. Macdonald (1917–1918)
- North Dakota Insurance Commissioners:
  - Sveinung A. Olsness (1917–1934)
  - Harold Hopton (1935–1936)
  - Oscar E. Erickson (1937–1945)
- North Dakota Commissioners of Agriculture and Labor:
  - John N. Hagan (1917–1921, 1937–1938)
  - Theodore Martell (1935–1936)
  - Math Dahl (1939–1964)
- North Dakota Tax Commissioners:
  - George E. Wallace (1919–1921)
  - Thorstein H. H. Thoresen (1925–1929)
  - Frank A. Vogel (1933)
  - J J. Weeks (1933–1935)
  - John Kenneth Murray (1937)
  - Owen T. Owen (1937–1938)
  - Claude P. Stone (1938–1939)
- North Dakota State Examiners:
  - James R. Waters (1917-1919)
  - O. E. Lofthus (1919–1921)
- North Dakota State Representatives:
  - A. C. Miller (1925–1927)

== Legacy ==
The NPL arose as a faction within the Republican Party in 1915. By the 1950s, its members felt more affiliation with the Democratic Party and merged with the North Dakota Democrats. The North Dakota branch of the Democratic Party is therefore known as the North Dakota Democratic-Nonpartisan League Party to this day. The Executive Committee of the NPL still formally exists within the party structure of the North Dakota Democratic-NPL. It was at one point headed by former State Senator Buckshot Hoffner (D-NPL, Esmond), chairman, and former Lt. Governor Lloyd B. Omdahl, Secretary.

The Nonpartisan League laid a foundation of enriched public ownership and responsibility in such institutions as a state bank. One study has drawn conclusions that publicly operated institutions such as the state bank have helped North Dakota weather these economic storms.

The Bank of North Dakota was created to address market failures associated with monopoly power among large financial and business institutions in the early twentieth century. This market power meant that small farming operations had inadequate access to credit. One of the goals of the Nonpartisan League was to remedy limited access to credit by establishing this institution. A measure of the public good brought about by the Bank's establishment that still stands today is what some have identified as the Bank's role in reducing the impact of economic recession. The public-private relationship establishes roles assigned according to what each sector does best, allowing the mutual benefit of public and private banks balancing out inequality and building equality, thus creating an economic safety net for North Dakota citizens. These early roots of the Democratic-Nonpartisan League party have been celebrated for establishing a foundation that rights the state in times of national crisis and provides economic security to generations of the state's farmers.

The early success of the party in North Dakota spawned Nonpartisan League branches on the Canadian prairies, including the Alberta Non-Partisan League and another in Saskatchewan. Two Alberta NPL members were elected in the 1917 provincial election; the party was absorbed in 1919 by the United Farmers of Alberta, who would form government from 1921 until 1935. These groups would later merge into the New Democratic Party (NDP). No NPL candidates were elected in Saskatchewan, but the party boasted the first woman to run for office in the province: Zoa Haight.

As of February 2026, both the North Dakota Mill and Elevator and the Bank of North Dakota continue to operate. The legislature in 1932 prohibited corporate farming and corporate ownership of farmland.

The Fred and Gladys Grady House and the Oliver and Gertrude Lundquist House, both in Bismarck, North Dakota, are listed on the U.S. National Register of Historic Places as examples of the work of the Nonpartisan League's Home Building Association.

The Nonpartisan League also inspired farmer intellectuals in Japan during the early 20th century.

== In popular media ==
- Northern Lights (1978), a feature film starring Joe Spano, portrayed early 20th century conditions in North Dakota and the rise of the NPL among immigrant farmers. The film won the 1980 Camera d'Or award for best first film at the Cannes Film Festival.
- The didactic historical novel Harangue (The Trees Said to the Bramble Come Reign Over Us) (1926) by Garet Garrett tells the story of the Non-Partisan League and its various supporters after the league took control of the North Dakota government in 1919.

== See also ==
- American left
- Agricultural Workers Organization
- Granger movement
- Boll weevil (politics)
- Minnesota Farmer–Labor Party
- Minnesota Democratic–Farmer–Labor Party
- Socialist Party of North Dakota
- North Dakota Democratic–Nonpartisan League Party
- United Farmers of Canada
- Alice Lorraine Daly
