= 1932 North Dakota gubernatorial election =

- November 8, 1932
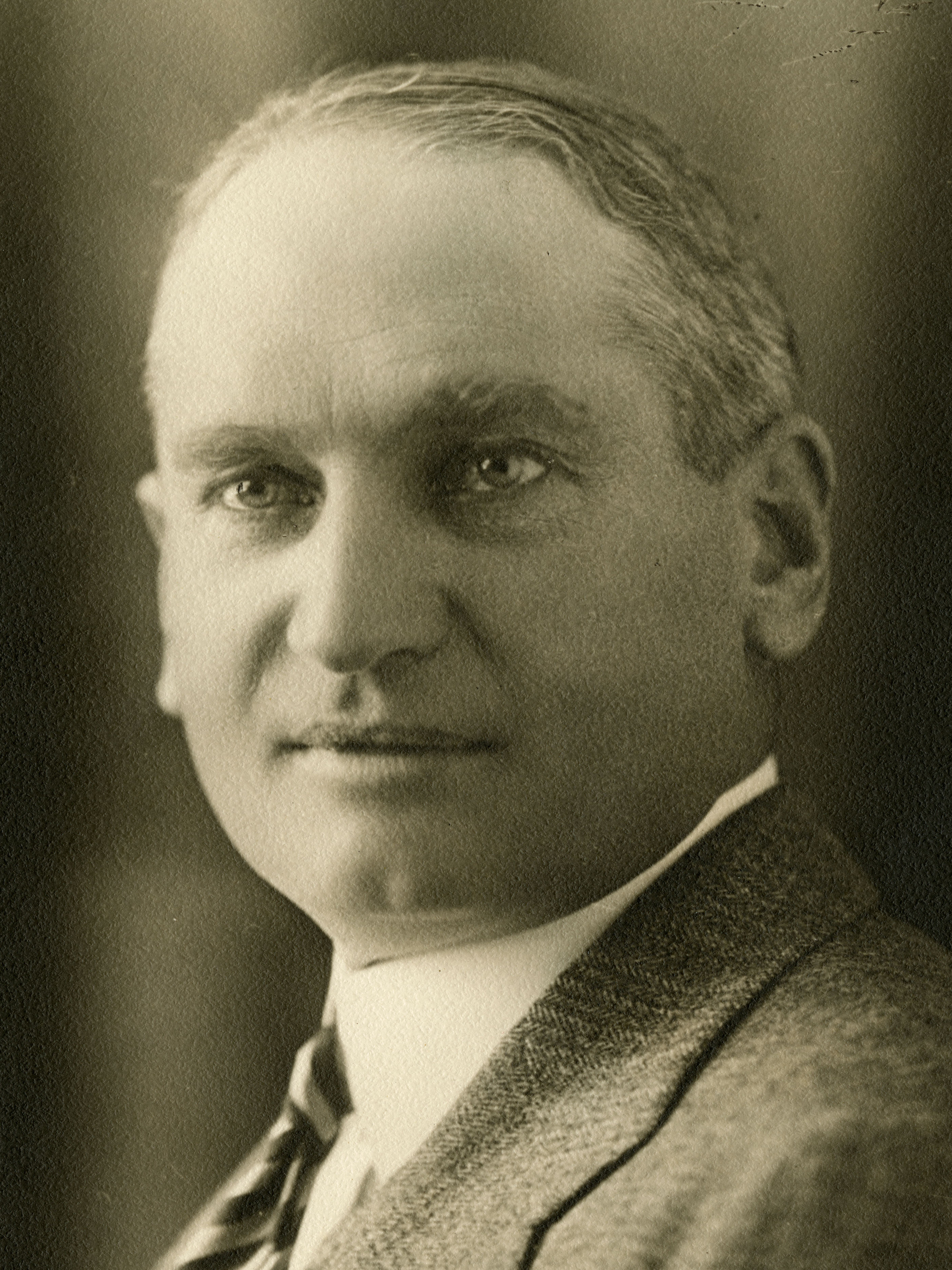

Nominee	William Langer	Herbert C. DePuy
Party	Republican	Democratic
Popular vote	134,231	110,263
Percentage	54.75%	44.97%
- County results Langer: 50–60% 60–70% 70–80% DePuy: 40–50% 50–60% 70–80%
Governor before election
George F. Shafer
Republican
Elected Governor
William Langer
Republican

The 1932 North Dakota gubernatorial election was held on November 8, 1932. Republican nominee William Langer defeated Democratic nominee Herbert C. DePuy with 54.75% of the vote.

== Primary elections ==
Primary elections were held on June 29, 1932.

=== Democratic primary ===
==== Candidates ====
- Herbert C. DePuy, former Walsh County State's Attorney
- Tobias D. Casey, former State Representative

==== Results ====
Democratic primary results
Party	Candidate	Votes	%
Democratic	Herbert C. DePuy	15,987	61.33
Democratic	Tobias D. Casey	10,079	38.67
Total votes		26,066	100.00

=== Republican primary ===
==== Candidates ====
- William Langer, former North Dakota Attorney General
- Frank H. Hyland, former Lieutenant Governor
- W. E. Black

==== Results ====
Republican primary results
Party	Candidate	Votes	%
Republican	William Langer	93,177	53.44
Republican	Frank H. Hyland	68,226	39.13
Republican	W. E. Black	12,963	7.43
Total votes		174,366	100.00

== General election ==
=== Candidates ===
Major party candidates

- William Langer, Republican
- Herbert C. DePuy, Democratic

Other candidates

- Andrew Omholt, Communist

=== Results ===
1932 North Dakota gubernatorial election
Party	Candidate	Votes	%	±%
Republican	William Langer	134,231	54.75	▼18.87
Democratic	Herbert C. DePuy	110,263	44.97	▲21.77
Communist	Andrew Omholt	691	0.28	▼2.90
Majority		23,968	9.78	▼40.65
Total votes		245,185	100.00	
Republican hold				
