= Rosemarie Myrdal =

American politician (1929–2023)

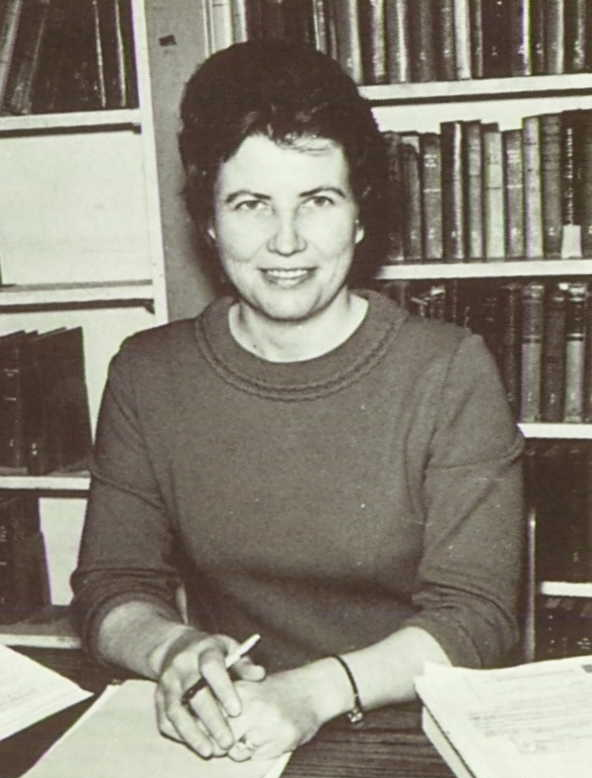
- Myrdal in 1969

35th Lieutenant Governor of North Dakota
- In office December 15, 1992 – December 15, 2000
- Governor: Ed Schafer
- Preceded by: Lloyd Omdahl
- Succeeded by: Jack Dalrymple

Member of the North Dakota House of Representatives from the 11th district
- In office December 1, 1984 – December 1, 1992 Serving with Alice Olson
- Preceded by: Kenneth Olafson
- Succeeded by: Robert Kilichowski

Personal details
- Born: Rosemarie Lohse; May 20, 1929 Minot, North Dakota, U.S.
- Died: October 11, 2023 (aged 94) Grafton, North Dakota, U.S.
- Party: Republican
- Spouse: Benedict John Myrdal (m. 1952; died 2000)
- Children: 5

Rosemarie Myrdal (née Lohse; May 20, 1929 – October 11, 2023) was an American North Dakota Republican Party politician who served as the second female, and 35th lieutenant governor of North Dakota from 1993 to 2001 under Governor Ed Schafer in 1992. She also served in the North Dakota House of Representatives from 1985 to 1992. Myrdal was married to Benedict John Myrdal in 1952 and had five children. He died in 2000.

Myrdal died in Grafton, North Dakota, at the age of 94.

== See also ==
- List of female lieutenant governors in the United States

== Notes ==
North Dakota House of Representatives
Preceded by Kenneth Olafson	Member of the North Dakota House of Representatives; 1984–1992 from the 11th district (Pembina County and part of Walsh County); Served alongside: Alice Olson	Succeeded by Robert Kilichowski
Party political offices
Preceded by Donna Nalewaja	Republican nominee for Lieutenant Governor of North Dakota; 1992, 1996	Succeeded by Jack Dalrymple
Political offices
Preceded by Lloyd Omdahl	Lieutenant Governor of North Dakota; 1992–2000	Succeeded by Jack Dalrymple
