= Kraabel =

Kraabel is an English surname, and may refer to:

- A. Thomas Kraabel (1934–2016), an American classics scholar and educator, grandson of Anton
- Anton Kraabel (1862–1934), a North Dakota Republican Party politician
- Caroline Kraabel (born 1961), an American composer, improviser and saxophonist
- Paul Kraabel (1933–2016), American politician, grandson of Anton
- Torger Oswald Kraabel (1893–1975), Director, American Legion's National Rehabilitation Commission from 1941 to 1958. Member of team that drafted the G.I. Bill of Rights, son of Anton Kraabel
