= Lisa K. Fair McEvers =

American judge (born 1962)

Lisa McEvers

Chief Justice of the North Dakota Supreme Court
- Incumbent
- Assumed office January 1, 2026
- Preceded by: Jon J. Jensen

Justice of the North Dakota Supreme Court
- Incumbent
- Assumed office January 1, 2014
- Appointed by: Jack Dalrymple
- Preceded by: Mary Muehlen Maring

Labor Commissioner of North Dakota
- In office 2005–2010
- Appointed by: John Hoeven
- Preceded by: LeAnn Bertsch
- Succeeded by: Tony Weiler

Personal details
- Born: 1962 (age 63–64) Grafton, North Dakota, U.S.
- Education: University of North Dakota (BBA, JD)

Lisa K. Fair McEvers (born 1962) is a North Dakota lawyer and jurist as the chief justice of the North Dakota Supreme Court since 2026 and concurrently as an associate justice since 2014. She previously served as Commissioner of the North Dakota Department of Labor from 2005 to 2010 and district judge from 2010 to 2014.

== Early life and education ==
McEvers was born in Grafton, North Dakota and raised in Minto, North Dakota. She graduated cum laude from the University of North Dakota in 1993 with a Bachelor of Business Administration in Information Management. She graduated with distinction from the University of North Dakota School of Law in 1997.

== Career ==
McEvers worked in court administration in the Northeast Judicial District of North Dakota before attending law school. After law school, she clerked at the North Dakota Supreme Court. She was in private legal practice from 1998 to 2001. She served as Cass County Assistant State's Attorney from 2001 to 2005.

She was appointed North Dakota Commissioner of Labor in July 2005. She was appointed district judge for the East Central Judicial District in 2010 and was chambered in Fargo, North Dakota. In 2014, Governor Jack Dalrymple appointed McEvers to the North Dakota Supreme Court to fill a vacancy created by the retirement of Justice Mary Muehlen Maring. She was elected to an unexpired two-year term in 2016 and re-elected to a ten-year term in 2018. In December 2025, she was elected by her fellow justices and district court judges to serve as chief justice. She is the first female chief justice of the court. Her term started on January 1, 2026.

Political offices
Preceded by LeAnn Bertsch	Labor Commissioner of North Dakota; 2005–2010	Succeeded by Tony Weiler
Legal offices
Preceded by Mary Muehlen Maring	Associate Justice of the North Dakota Supreme Court; 2014–present	Incumbent
Preceded by Jon J. Jensen	Chief Justice of the North Dakota Supreme Court; 2026–present	Incumbent
