= John W. Carr =

American politician (1874–1932)

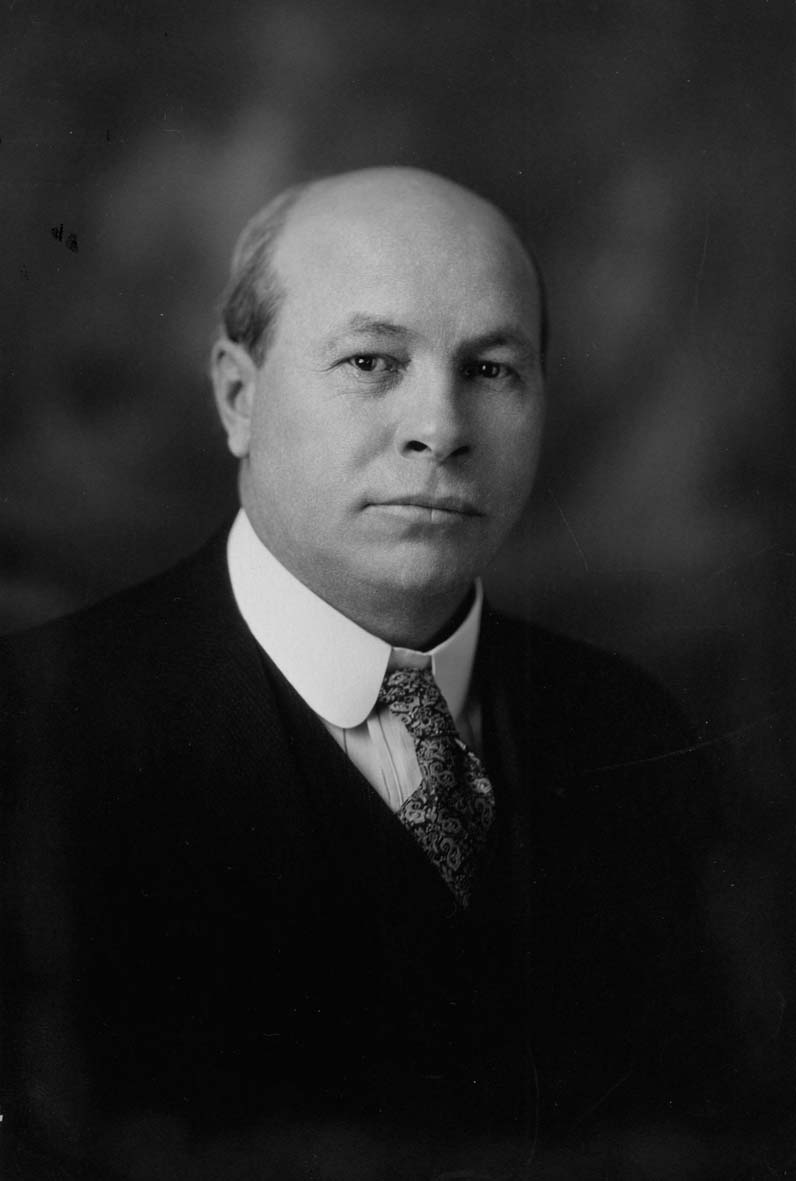

15th Lieutenant Governor of North Dakota
- In office January 9, 1929 – June 14, 1932
- Governor: George F. Shafer; William Langer
- Preceded by: Walter Maddock
- Succeeded by: Ole H. Olson

Personal details
- Born: March 26, 1874 Fayette County, Iowa
- Died: June 14, 1932 (aged 58) Jamestown, North Dakota
- Party: Republican

John W. Carr (March 26, 1874 – June 14, 1932) was a North Dakota Republican Party politician who served as the 15th lieutenant governor of North Dakota under Governor George F. Shafer. Carr also served in the North Dakota House from 1923 to 1928.

Carr was born on March 26, 1874, in Fayette County, Iowa. He married Marie Remmen (May 19, 1874 - March 4, 1920) on August 22, 1905, in Valley City, North Dakota. They had four children: Edwin Remmen Carr, (June 11, 1906 - April 22, 1999), Mary Tora Carr McDonald (May 4, 1909 - November 2, 2003), William John Carr (February 8, 1915 - November 4, 1998), and Martha Marie Carr Oyen (October 5, 1917 - November 9, 1998). He died on June 14, 1932, in Jamestown, North Dakota. At the time of his death, Carr was a candidate for Governor of North Dakota.

Party political offices
| Preceded by Walter Maddock | Republican nominee for Lieutenant Governor of North Dakota; 1928, 1930 | Succeeded by Ole H. Olson |
Political offices
| Preceded by Walter Maddock | Lieutenant Governor of North Dakota; 1929–1933 | Succeeded by Ole H. Olson |
