= Lloyd Omdahl =

American politician (1931–2024)

34th Lieutenant Governor of North Dakota
- In office March 19, 1987 – December 15, 1992
- Governor: George Sinner
- Preceded by: Ruth Meiers
- Succeeded by: Rosemarie Myrdal

Tax Commissioner of North Dakota
- In office 1963–1966
- Governor: William L. Guy
- Preceded by: J. Arthur Engen
- Succeeded by: Edwin O. Sjaasstad

Personal details
- Born: January 5, 1931 Conway, North Dakota, U.S.
- Died: April 14, 2024 (aged 93) Grand Forks, North Dakota, U.S.
- Party: Democratic-NPL
- Education: University of North Dakota
- Occupation: professor

Lloyd B. Omdahl (January 5, 1931 – April 14, 2024) was an American politician who was the 34th lieutenant governor of North Dakota, taking office after Ruth Meiers died in 1987. Governor George A. Sinner was re-elected with Omdahl on the Democratic-NPL ticket in 1988. He was the last Democrat to hold that role to date.

Previously, Omdahl was a professor of political science at the University of North Dakota and was the Democratic nominee for North Dakota's at-large congressional district in 1976. He won the Democratic primary with 46,382 votes (86.43%), defeating Torfin Teigen, who took 7,281 votes (13.57%). In the general election, he lost to incumbent Republican Congressman Mark Andrews by 181,018 votes (62.45%) to 104,263 votes (35.97%). Russell Kleppe of the American Party took 4,600 votes (1.59%).

Omdahl, along with Buckshot Hoffner was one of the last two remaining members of the Executive Committee of the Nonpartisan League.

Omdahl died in Grand Forks, North Dakota, on April 14, 2024, at the age of 93.

Party political offices
Preceded by Albert Heide	Democratic nominee for North Dakota Secretary of State; 1960	Succeeded by Larry Schneider
Preceded by Ruth Meiers	Democratic nominee for Lieutenant Governor of North Dakota; 1988	Succeeded by Julie Hill
Political offices
Preceded by J. Arthur Engen	Tax Commissioner of North Dakota; 1963–1966	Succeeded by Edwin O. Sjaasstad
Preceded by Ruth Meiers	Lieutenant Governor of North Dakota; 1987–1992	Succeeded by Rosemarie Myrdal
