= List of labor commissioners of North Dakota =

The following is a list of labor commissioners of North Dakota. The office was established in 1966 when it, along with the agriculture commissioner, split from the commissioner of agriculture and labor. The office was an elected position on the no-party ballot from 1966 to 1998. Since 1999, the commissioner has been appointed by the governor of North Dakota, and is part of the North Dakota State Cabinet.

#	Name	Term
1	Orville Hagen	1967–1986
2	Byron Knutson	1987–1990
3	Craig Hagen	1991–1998
4	Tony Clark	1999–2000
5	Mark D. Bachmeier	2001–2004
6	LeAnn K. Bertsch	2004–2005
7	Lisa K. Fair McEvers	2005–2010
8	Tony Weiler	2010–2013
9	Bonnie Storbakken	2013–2014
10	Troy Seibel	2014–2016
11	Michelle Kommer	2016–2019
12	Erica Thunder	2019–2022
13	Nathan Svihovec	2022–2025
14	Zachary Greenberg	2025–

== See also ==
- North Dakota Labor Commissioner
