= 1928 North Dakota gubernatorial election =

- November 6, 1928
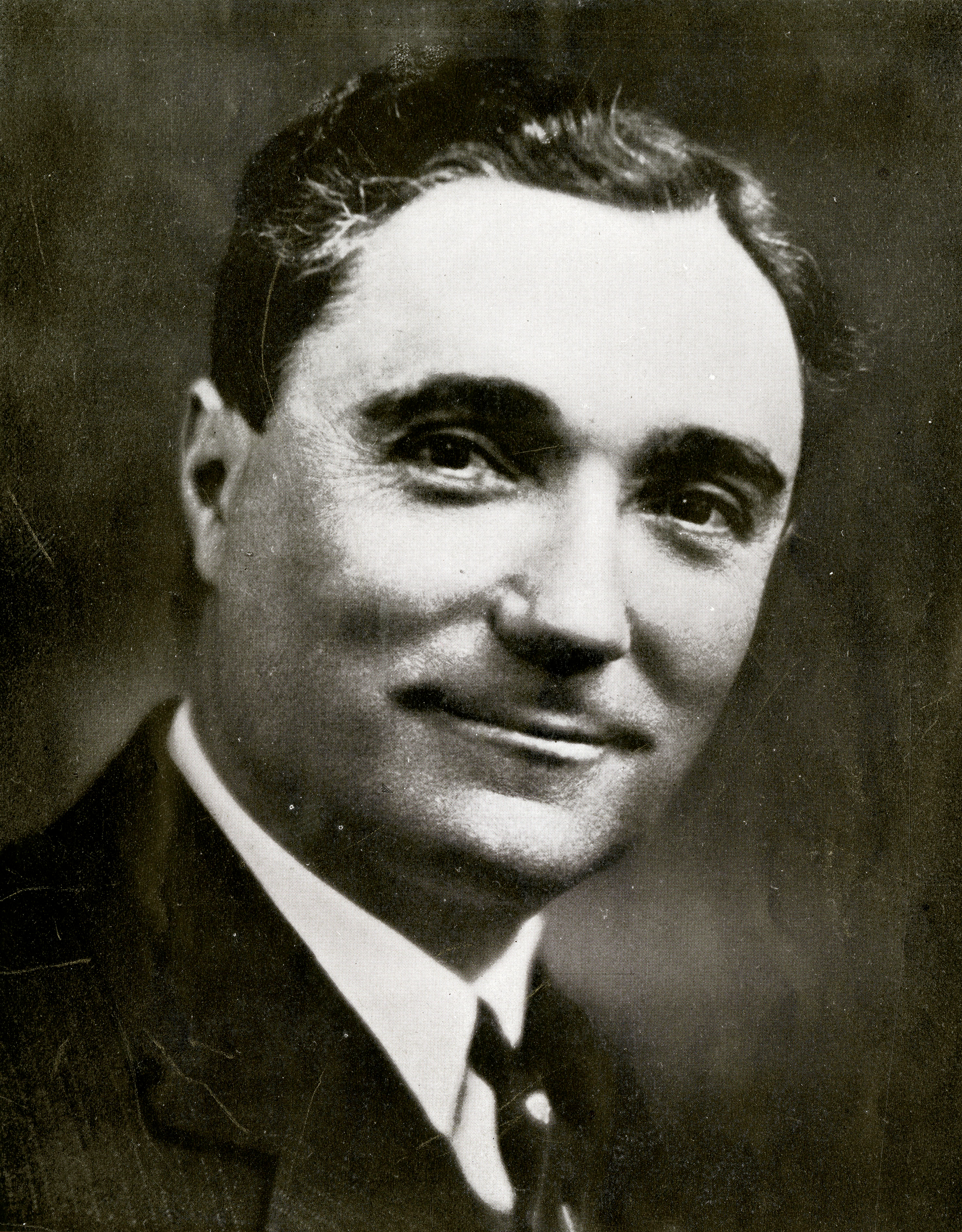

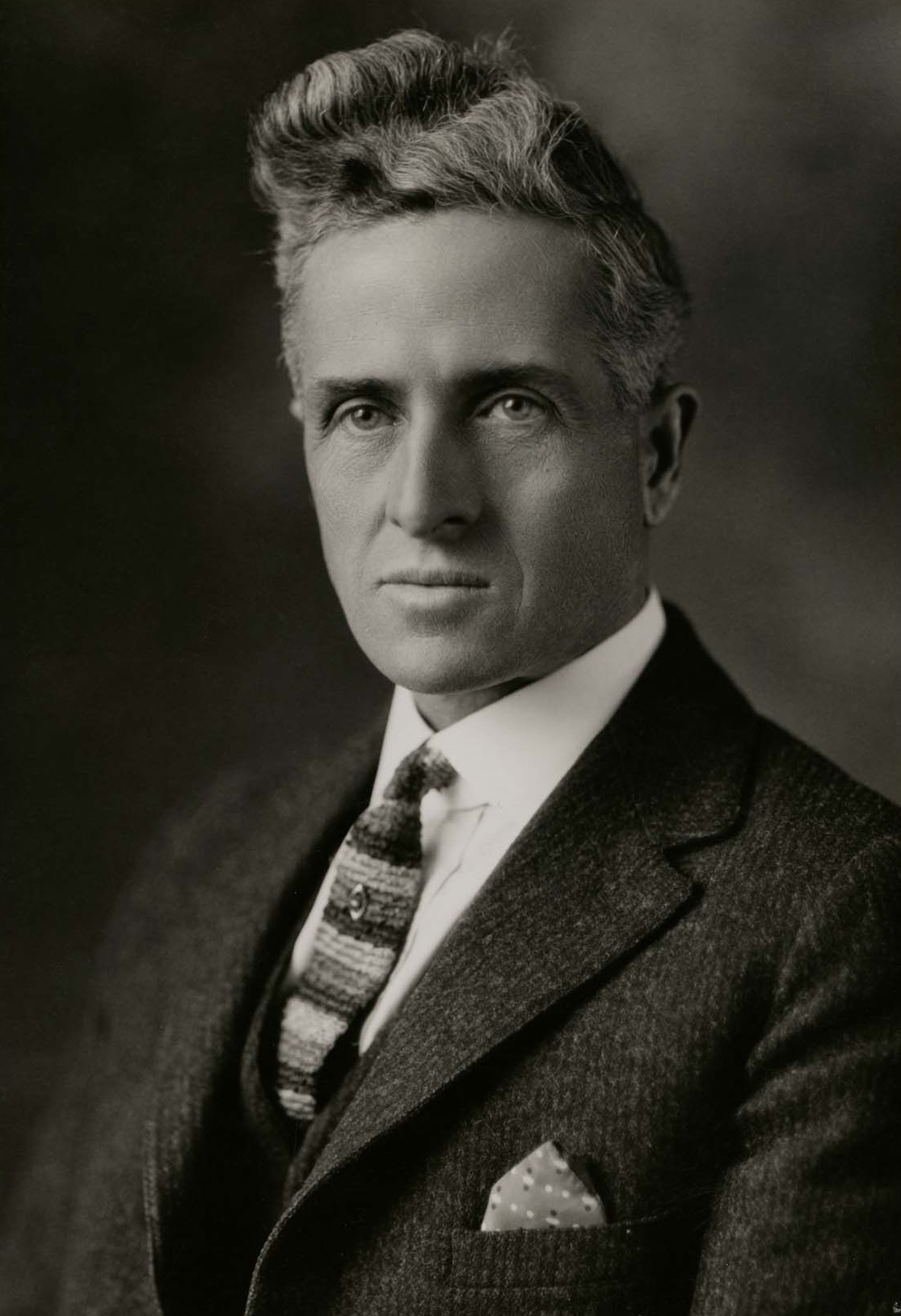
Nominee	George F. Shafer	Walter Maddock
Party	Republican	Democratic
Popular vote	131,193	100,205
Percentage	56.50%	43.15%
- County results Shafer: 50–60% 60–70% 70–80% Maddock: 40–50% 50–60% 60–70%
Governor before election
Walter Maddock
Democratic
Elected Governor
George F. Shafer
Republican

The 1928 North Dakota gubernatorial election was held on November 6, 1928. Republican nominee George F. Shafer defeated Democratic incumbent Walter Maddock with 56.50% of the vote.

== Primary elections ==
Primary elections were held on June 27, 1928.

=== Democratic primary ===
==== Candidates ====
- Fred L. Anderson
- Charles K. Otto

==== Results ====
Democratic primary results
Party	Candidate	Votes	%
Democratic	Fred L. Anderson	5,825	51.30
Democratic	Charles K. Otto	5,530	48.70
Total votes		11,355	100.00

=== Republican primary ===
==== Candidates ====
- George F. Shafer, North Dakota Attorney General
- Thorstein H. H. Thoresen, North Dakota Tax Commissioner
- Charles Streich

==== Results ====
Republican primary results
Party	Candidate	Votes	%
Republican	George F. Shafer	92,212	50.88
Republican	Thorstein H. H. Thoresen	83,209	45.92
Republican	Charles Streich	5,798	3.20
Total votes		181,219	100.00

== General election ==
The incumber Lieutenant Governor Walter Maddock had a contentious relationship with the incumbent governor Arthur G. Sorlie. Both Maddock and Sorlie were members of the Nonpartisan League (NPL) faction of the Republican party, but Maddock had criticized Sorlie for being too conservative. Maddock had decided not to run for reelection after the Republican National Convention in 1928 refused to adopt policy planks that had been supported by the NPL. On August 28, 1928, Sorlie died, elevating Maddock to the governor's office. Only a few weeks later Maddock announced that he was switching parties to become a Democrat. Six weeks before the election, the winner of the Democratic primary, Fred Anderson, withdrew from the race in order to allow Maddock to seek a full term as the Democratic nominee.

=== Candidates ===
Major party candidates

- George F. Shafer, Republican
- Walter Maddock, Democratic

Other candidates

- K. P. Loesch, Farmer–Labor

=== Results ===
1928 North Dakota gubernatorial election
Party	Candidate	Votes	%	±%
Republican	George F. Shafer	131,193	56.50	▼25.24
Democratic	Walter Maddock (inc.)	100,205	43.15	▲28.00
Farmer–Labor	K. P. Loesch	824	0.36	▼2.74
Majority		30,988	14.60	▼51.99
Total votes		212,222	100.00	
Republican gain from Democratic				
