= Ruth Meiers Hospitality House =

Homeless shelter in North Dakota, United States

Coordinates: 46°48′23″N 100°45′52″W

The Ruth Meiers Hospitality House, Inc. was a shelter for the homeless located in Bismarck, North Dakota. It was founded in 1987 and is named after Ruth Meiers, the first woman Lieutenant Governor of North Dakota. The first home was leased from HUD for $1 and has grown from a 7-person to a 210-bed shelter with 110 affordable housing units.

== Programs ==
- The Women with Children and Single Women's Emergency Shelter
- The Men's Emergency Shelter
- New Beginnings
- Horizons

== Supplemental services ==
- The Stone Soup Kitchen
- Joanne’s Healthcare
- The Drop-In Center
- Educational Services
- The Baby Boutique
- The Used Furniture Barn
- The Food Pantry
- Single Point of Entry
