= Byron Knutson =

American politician (1929–2025)

2nd North Dakota Labor Commissioner
- In office 1987–1991
- Governor: George A. Sinner
- Preceded by: Orville W. Hagen
- Succeeded by: Craig Hagen

16th North Dakota Insurance Commissioner
- In office 1977–1981
- Governor: Arthur A. Link
- Preceded by: Jorris O. Wigen
- Succeeded by: Jorris O. Wigen

Member of the North Dakota House of Representatives from the 20th district
- In office December 1, 1958 – December 1, 1962
- Preceded by: C. H. Hofstrand
- Succeeded by: S. F. Hoffner

Personal details
- Born: November 9, 1929 Harlow, North Dakota, U.S.
- Died: December 6, 2025 (aged 96)
- Party: Democratic (D-NPL)
- Spouse: Bernice Hofstad
- Education: University of North Dakota

Military service
- Branch/service: United States Marine Corps
- Battles/wars: Korean War

Byron Knutson (November 9, 1929 – December 6, 2025) was a North Dakota Democratic-NPL Party politician who served as the North Dakota Insurance Commissioner from 1977 to 1980 and as the North Dakota Labor Commissioner from 1987 to 1990. He previously served in the North Dakota House of Representatives from 1959 to 1962.

== Early life ==
Knutson was born near Harlow (a small town near Brinsmade) on November 9, 1929, and raised in Harlow near Devis Lake.

He was educated in Harlow elementary schools and graduated from Benson County Agriculture and Training High School in Maddock, North Dakota. He attended North Dakota State University, University of North Dakota, and Valley City State College for his college education.

== Political career ==
Knutson served in the North Dakota House of Representatives from 1959 to 1963, and ran for North Dakota Public Service Commissioner in 1974, but was unsuccessful. He was elected as the North Dakota Insurance Commissioner in 1976, but was defeated in 1980. After being defeated, he ran for North Dakota Labor Commissioner in 1982, and for North Dakota Secretary of State in 1984, but was unsuccessful in both elections. He tried again for Labor Commissioner in 1986, and this time won, defeating Orville W. Hagen. His tenure was short-lived, however, and he was defeated in 1990 by Craig Hagen, who is of no relation to Orville.

== Personal life ==
He was married to Bernice, and has two daughters: Rebecca and Harmony.

Knutson died surrounded by his family on December 6, 2025.

== Notes ==
Party political offices
Preceded by Bernard Majors	Democratic nominee for North Dakota Insurance Commissioner; 1976, 1980	Succeeded by Earl Pomeroy
Preceded by Ella B. Ombolt	Democratic nominee for North Dakota Secretary of State; 1984	Succeeded by Jim Kusler
Political offices
Preceded by Jorris O. Wigen	Insurance Commissioner of North Dakota; 1977–1981	Succeeded by Jorris O. Wigen
Preceded by Orville W. Hagen	North Dakota Commissioner of Labor; 1987–1991	Succeeded by Craig Hagen
