= Walter Maddock =

American politician (1880–1951)

Walter J. Maddock
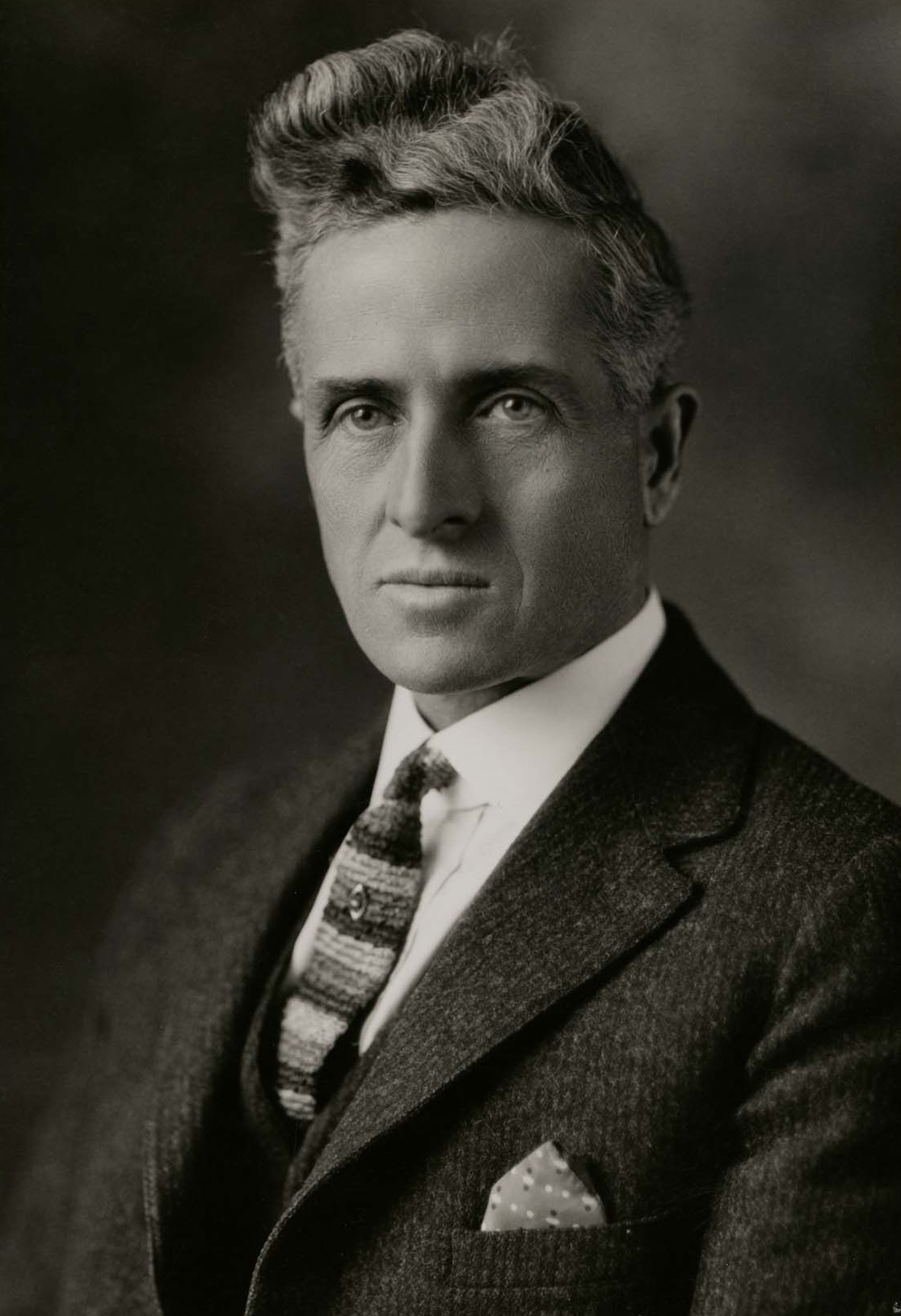
- Maddock c. 1928

15th Governor of North Dakota
- In office August 28, 1928 – January 9, 1929
- Lieutenant: John W. Carr
- Preceded by: Arthur G. Sorlie
- Succeeded by: George F. Shafer

14th Lieutenant Governor of North Dakota
- In office January 7, 1925 – August 28, 1928
- Governor: Arthur G. Sorlie
- Preceded by: Frank H. Hyland
- Succeeded by: John W. Carr

Member of the North Dakota House of Representatives
- In office 1915–1923

Personal details
- Born: September 13, 1880 Grand Forks, Dakota Territory
- Died: January 25, 1951 (aged 70) Bismarck, North Dakota, U.S.
- Party: Republican (NPL); Democratic

Walter Jeremiah Maddock (September 13, 1880 – January 25, 1951) was an American politician in North Dakota, US. He served in the North Dakota House of Representatives from 1915 to 1923, and became the 14th lieutenant governor of North Dakota in 1925. Maddock became the 15th governor of North Dakota in 1928 when Arthur G. Sorlie died in office. He was the first governor born in what would eventually become North Dakota.

== Biography ==
He was born in Grand Forks, Dakota Territory. He was educated at Northwestern Business College in Grand Forks, North Dakota. He was married on October 30, 1906, to Margarite Tierney. They had five children: Wallace, Jerome, Dore R. V., Bernard, and Margarite.

== Career ==
Maddock's first involvement with politics was as one of the founders of the Nonpartisan League. He was a member of the North Dakota House of Representatives from 1915 through 1923. He became the Lieutenant Governor in 1925, and upon the death of Governor Sorlie, he assumed the governorship in 1928. He served the remainder of Sorlie's term and sought re-election, but he failed to win the race against George F. Shafer. In the 1928 election, he took the unusual step of switching parties from Republican to Democratic.

After being defeated in the election, Maddock returned to farming and was active in organizing farmers' cooperatives. He was a very strong supporter of the Nonpartisan League, and he also supported two state-owned industries, the Bank of North Dakota and the State Mill and Elevator. In 1933, he became the senior administrative officer of the regional Agricultural Adjustment Administration. From 1937 until his retirement in 1950, he served as the head of North Dakota's Farm Security Administration office.

== Death ==
Maddock died on January 25, 1951, and is buried in Saint Mary's Cemetery, Bismarck, Burleigh County, North Dakota, US.

Party political offices
Preceded by Frank H. Hyland	Republican nominee for Lieutenant Governor of North Dakota; 1924, 1926	Succeeded by John W. Carr
Preceded by David M. Holmes	Democratic nominee for Governor of North Dakota; 1928	Succeeded by Pierce Blewett
Political offices
Preceded by Frank H. Hyland	Lieutenant Governor of North Dakota; January 7, 1925 – August 28, 1928	Succeeded by John W. Carr
Preceded by Arthur G. Sorlie	Governor of North Dakota; August 28, 1928 – January 9, 1929	Succeeded by George F. Shafer
