= 1926 North Dakota gubernatorial election =

- November 2, 1926
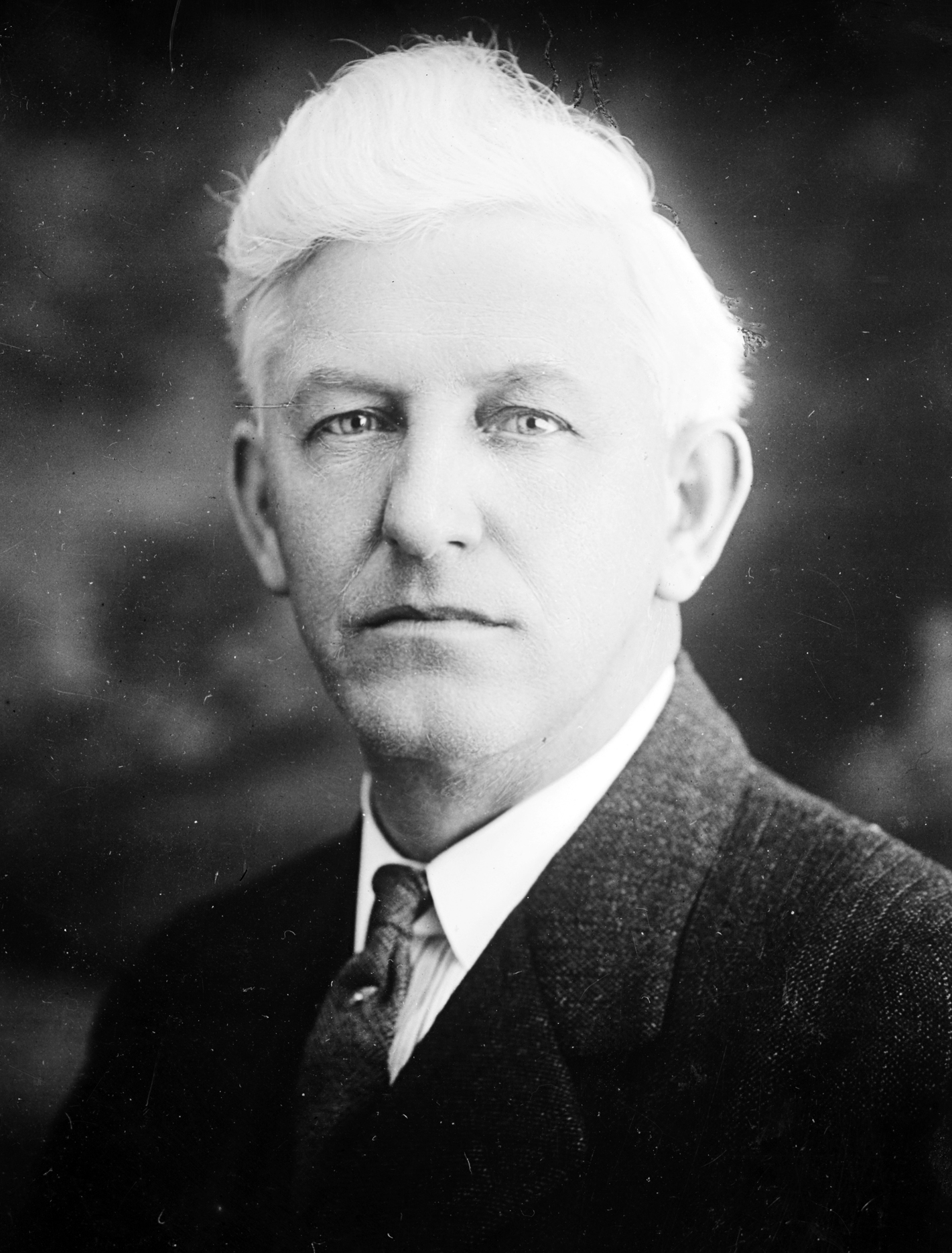

Nominee	Arthur G. Sorlie	David M. Holmes
Party	Republican	Democratic
Popular vote	131,003	24,287
Percentage	81.74%	15.15%
- County results Sorlie: 70–80% 80–90% 90–100%
Governor before election
Arthur G. Sorlie
Republican
Elected Governor
Arthur G. Sorlie
Republican

The 1926 North Dakota gubernatorial election was held on November 2, 1926. Incumbent Republican Arthur G. Sorlie defeated Democratic nominee David M. Holmes in a landslide victory with 81.74% of the vote.

Sorlie won with the biggest vote percentage (and Holmes, in contrast, the fewest for a major party nominee) in North Dakota history.

== Primary elections ==
Primary elections were held on June 30, 1926.

=== Democratic primary ===
==== Candidates ====
- David M. Holmes, businessman

==== Results ====
Democratic primary results
Party	Candidate	Votes	%
Democratic	David M. Holmes	6,141	100.00
Total votes		6,141	100.00

=== Republican primary ===
==== Candidates ====
- Arthur G. Sorlie, incumbent Governor
- James M. Hanley, former North Dakota District Court Judge
- J. A. McGovern

==== Results ====
Republican primary results
Party	Candidate	Votes	%
Republican	Arthur G. Sorlie (inc.)	90,563	55.83
Republican	James M. Hanley	66,190	40.80
Republican	J. A. McGovern	5,472	3.37
Total votes		162,225	100.00

== General election ==
=== Candidates ===
Major party candidates

- Arthur G. Sorlie, Republican
- David M. Holmes, Democratic

Other candidates

- Ralph Ingerson, Farmer–Labor

=== Results ===
1926 North Dakota gubernatorial election
Party	Candidate	Votes	%	±%
Republican	Arthur G. Sorlie (inc.)	131,003	81.74	▲27.81
Democratic	David M. Holmes	24,287	15.15	▼30.92
Farmer–Labor	Ralph Ingerson	4,974	3.10	N/A
Majority		106,716	66.59	▲58.73
Total votes		160,264	100.00	
Republican hold				
