= Richard F. Larsen =

American politician (1936–2022)

30th Lieutenant Governor of North Dakota
- In office 1969–1973
- Governor: William L. Guy
- Preceded by: Charles Tighe
- Succeeded by: Wayne Sanstead

Member of the North Dakota House of Representatives
- In office 1965–1966

Member of the North Dakota Senate
- In office 1968–1969

Personal details
- Born: August 12, 1936 Grand Forks, North Dakota, U.S.
- Died: August 27, 2022 (aged 86) Santa Monica, California, U.S.
- Party: Republican
- Spouse: Christine Ellen (m. 1961)
- Education: Harvard University (BA); London School of Economics (PhD)
- Occupation: academic, politician

Richard F. Larsen (August 12, 1936 – August 27, 2022) was an American politician who served as the 30th lieutenant governor of North Dakota from 1969 to 1973 under Governor William L. Guy. Larsen also served in the North Dakota House from 1965 to 1966 and the North Dakota Senate from 1967 to 1968.

== Early life and education ==
Larsen was born in Grand Forks, North Dakota in 1936, the son of Ralph and Ella (née Lundby) Larsen. He attended Harvard University, where earned a Bachelor of Arts degree in economics, graduating cum laude in 1960. He then earned a PhD in economics from the London School of Economics in 1963.

== Career ==
Larsen was a professor of economics and business at the University of North Dakota from 1963 to 1965, Moorhead State University from 1965 to 1967, and an instructor at the North Dakota University Graduate School of Industrial Management. He was a member of Both the North Dakota State House of Representatives and the state senate. he serve one term in both, In 1968 he was elected lieutenant governor of North Dakota Defeating Democrat Charles Tighe by 13,206 votes, and served one term from 1969-1973. In 1972 Larsen Ran for Governor. he defeated Robert P. McCarney for the Republican nomination. In the general election he faced Democratic congressman Arthur Link. Larsen narrowly Lost the general election to Link. by 5,867 votes. In 1973, Larsen was appointed by United States Secretary of the Treasury George Shultz to serve as Deputy Assistant Secretary for Developing Nations Finance in the Office of the Under Secretary of the Treasury for International Affairs.

Larsen died on August 27, 2022, at the age of 86.

== Notes ==
Party political offices
| Preceded by Frank A. Wenstrom | Republican nominee for Lieutenant Governor of North Dakota; 1968 | Succeeded by I. J. Wilhite |
| Preceded by Robert P. McCarney | Republican nominee for Governor of North Dakota; 1972 | Succeeded by Richard Elkin |
