= First ladies of North Dakota =

Wives of the governor

First Lady of North Dakota
- Incumbent; Kjersti Høiby since December 15, 2024
- Residence: North Dakota Governor's Residence
- Inaugural holder: Caddie Tucker Miller
- Formation: November 20, 1889
- Website: Office of the First Lady

The first lady of North Dakota is the unofficial title of the wife of the governor of North Dakota. The state's current first lady is Kjersti Høiby since 2024.

== List of first ladies of North Dakota ==
#	Name	Term
	Caddie Tucker Miller	1889–1891
	Caroline Cleveland Burke	1891–1892
	Anna Burton Shortridge	1893–1895
	Isabella McKenzie Allin	1895–1897
	Nannie Briggs	1897–1898
	Mary Bernadine Devine	1898–1899
	Florence Van Voorhies Fancher	1899–1901
	Elsie Hadley White	1901–1905
	Anna York Sarles	1905–1907
	Mary Kane Burke	1907–1913
	Lottie Hanna	1913–1917
	Lottie Stafford Frazier	1917–1921
	Position Vacant - Gov. Ragnvald Nestos never married	1921–1925
	Grace Hilleboe Sorlie	1925–1928
	Margarite Maddock	1928–1929
	Frances Shafer	1929–1932
	Lydia Cady Langer	1932–1934
	Julia Georgine Olson	1934–1935
	Lydia Cady Langer	1937–1939
	Ethel Moses	1939–1945
	Luella Aandahl	1945–1951
	Carrie Lajord Brunsdale	1951–1957
	Pauline Davis	1957–1961
	Jean Guy	1961–1973
	Grace Link	1973–1981
	Barbara Benner Olson	1981–1985
	Elizabeth "Jane" Sinner	1985–1992
	Nancy Jones Schafer	1992–2000
	Mikey L. Hoeven	2000–2010
	Betsy Dalrymple	2010–2016
	Kathryn Helgaas Burgum	2016–2024
	Kjersti Høiby	2024–Present
