= John H. Fraine =

American politician (1861–1943)

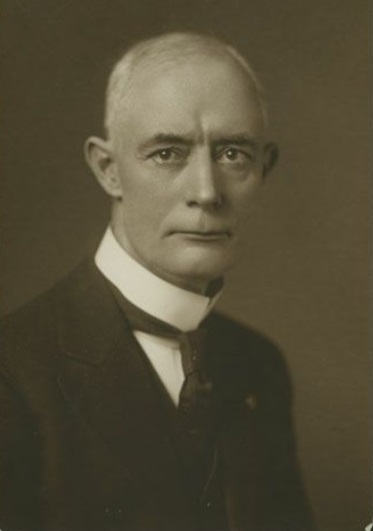
- State Historical Society of North Dakota photo, c. 1909

10th Lieutenant Governor of North Dakota
- In office 1915–1917
- Governor: L. B. Hanna
- Preceded by: Anton T. Kraabel
- Succeeded by: Anton T. Kraabel

13th Speaker of the North Dakota House of Representatives
- In office 1913–1915
- Preceded by: James M. Hanley
- Succeeded by: Alfred P. Hanson

Member of the North Dakota House of Representatives
- In office 1909–1915 Serving with Jacob Nelson (1909–1913)
- Preceded by: K. O. Brotnov, Tobias D. Casey
- Succeeded by: Sever Tallack
- Constituency: 4th district

Personal details
- Born: September 7, 1861 Sheffield, England
- Died: May 15, 1943 (aged 81) Minneapolis, Minnesota, U.S.
- Resting place: Lakewood Cemetery, Minneapolis, Minnesota, U.S.
- Party: Republican
- Spouse: Marian Robinson (m. 1882)
- Children: 1
- Profession: Attorney

Military service
- Service: United States Army
- Years of service: 1885–1933
- Rank: Colonel (National Guard); Brigadier General (Retired list)
- Unit: North Dakota National Guard
- Commands: Company C, 1st North Dakota Infantry Regiment; 2nd Battalion, 1st North Dakota Infantry Regiment; 1st North Dakota Infantry Regiment; 164th Infantry Regiment; 82nd Infantry Brigade
- Conflicts: Spanish–American War; Philippine–American War; Mexican Border War; World War I Occupation of the Rhineland
- Awards: Silver Star

John H. Fraine (September 7, 1861 – May 15, 1943) was a North Dakota Republican Party politician who served as the tenth lieutenant governor of North Dakota under Governor L. B. Hanna. Fraine also served in the North Dakota House of Representatives from 1909 to 1915, and as speaker of the house from 1913 to 1915.

== Early life ==
John Henry Fraine was born in Sheffield, England, September 7, 1861. In 1866, the Fraine family moved to Brooklyn, and soon after moved to Springfield, Massachusetts, where Fraine was raised and educated. Fraine moved to Grafton, North Dakota in 1885, where he studied law and was admitted to the bar in May 1891. He then practiced in partnership with O. E. Sauter, an arrangement that continued until Sauter became a judge, after which Fraine practiced alone.

== Start of career ==
Fraine joined the North Dakota National Guard in 1885 as a private in Company C, 1st North Dakota Infantry Regiment. He advanced through the enlisted grades to become the company's first sergeant, and in 1891, he became the company commander and received his commission as a captain. At the outbreak of the Spanish–American War in 1898, he was commissioned as a captain of United States Volunteers when Company C was federalized. He served in the Philippines for 17 months during the Philippine–American War and was promoted to major commanding the regiment's 2nd Battalion. During the war, he participated in 24 engagements. Fraine's regiment served under General Henry Ware Lawton in three battles, and after one of them, Lawton commended the unit by commenting "You can not stampede the 1st North Dakota".

In 1900, Fraine returned to practicing law and serving with the National Guard. He was subsequently promoted to lieutenant colonel. A Republican, he was a member of the North Dakota House of Representatives from 1909 to 1915. From 1913 to 1915, he was speaker of the house. In 1914, he was elected lieutenant governor, an office he held for one term, 1915 to 1917. Fraine served on active military duty again in 1916 during the Mexican Border War.

== Continued career ==
By the outbreak of World War I he was colonel and commander of the 1st North Dakota. At the outbreak of the war, he mobilized the regiment and led it during its training at Camp Greene, North Carolina. In December, 1917, the regiment sailed for Europe and it landed in England on Christmas Eve. The regiment, now redesignated as the 164th Infantry, a unit of the 41st Division subsequently moved to France, where Fraine served as interim commander of the division's 82nd Infantry Brigade on several occasions. He was later assigned to civil affairs staff duty with U.S. VII Corps.

Fraine continued to serve on the corps staff until the Armistice of November 11, 1918 ended the war, and he continued to serve in Wittlich during the post-war occupation of Germany. In July, 1919, Fraine was discharged and returned to North Dakota, where he continued to practice law. In December 1924, Fraine received the Citation Star for heroism in combat during the Philippine–American War. When the Silver Star award was created in 1932, Fraine's Citation Star was converted to the new medal. He continued to serve with the National Guard until 1933, and was promoted to brigadier general on the retired list in recognition of his 48 years of superior service.

== Personal ==
In 1882, Fraine married to Marian Robinson of Massachusetts. They were the parents of a son, John R. Fraine, who was employed by the Republic Steel Corporation in Chicago.

Fraine was a Freemason and served as grand high priest of North Dakota's Royal Arch Masons and grand commander of the state's Knights Templar. He was also an active member of the Episcopal Church.

During the later part of his career, Fraine served as legal advisor to the head of the Minneapolis Veterans Administration office. After a period of ill health, Fraine died at the Veterans Administration hospital in Minneapolis on May 15, 1943. His funeral took place at St. John's Episcopal church in Minneapolis. He was buried at Lakewood Cemetery in Minneapolis.

== Legacy ==
1945, the governor named the North Dakota National Guard headquarters Fraine Barracks as a commendation of Fraine's exemplary military career.

Political offices
| Preceded by Anton T. Kraabel | Lieutenant Governor of North Dakota; 1915–1917 | Succeeded by Anton T. Kraabel |
