= Frank A. Wenstrom =

American politician

28th Lieutenant Governor of North Dakota
- In office 1963–1965
- Governor: William L. Guy
- Preceded by: Orville W. Hagen
- Succeeded by: Charles Tighe

Personal details
- Born: July 27, 1903 Wells County, North Dakota
- Died: May 12, 1997 (aged 93) Williston, North Dakota
- Party: Republican

Frank A. Wenstrom (July 27, 1903 – May 12, 1997) was a North Dakota Republican Party politician who served as the 28th lieutenant governor of North Dakota under Governor William L. Guy. Wenstrom also served in the North Dakota Senate for District 1 from 1957 to 1960 and 1967 to 1986, and was the President of the state's second Constitutional Convention.

Franklin Augustus Wenstrom was born and grew up in Wells County, North Dakota. He was the son of James A. Wenstrom (1874–1963) and Anna (Kringstad) Wenstrom (1874–1967). His parents were of Norwegian and Swedish immigrant heritage. Beginning in 1933, he worked in the oil business in Carrington, North Dakota. In 1945, he became secretary- manager for the Williston (N.D.) Chamber of Commerce. Wenstrom worked as public relations officer for First National Bank of Williston (1951–1960).

In 1938, he was married to Mary Esther Pickett (1907–2002). Wenstrom died at age 93 in 1997 and was buried at Riverview Cemetery in Williston.

Party political offices
Preceded by Orville W. Hagen	Republican nominee for Lieutenant Governor of North Dakota; 1962, 1964	Succeeded by Richard F. Larsen
Political offices
Preceded by Orville W. Hagen	Lieutenant Governor of North Dakota; 1963–1965	Succeeded by Charles Tighe
