= Charles Tighe =

American lawyer and politician

29th Lieutenant Governor of North Dakota
- In office 1965–1969
- Governor: William L. Guy
- Preceded by: Frank A. Wenstrom
- Succeeded by: Richard F. Larsen

Personal details
- Born: January 21, 1927; Fargo, North Dakota, US
- Died: December 13, 2004 (aged 77); Bismarck, North Dakota, US
- Political party: Democratic

Bernard Charles Tighe (January 21, 1927 – December 13, 2004) was an American lawyer who served as the 29th lieutenant governor of North Dakota of 1965–1969, serving under Governor William L. Guy.

== Background ==
Born in Fargo, North Dakota, Tighe graduated from Fargo High School. He went to the University of Notre Dame briefly and then served in the United States Navy. He then received his bachelor's degree and law degrees from the University of North Dakota and was admitted to the North Dakota bar. He then practiced law. He served as the Lieutenant Governor of North Dakota in 1965-1969 as a Democrat. He died in Bismarck, North Dakota.

== Notes ==
Party political offices
Preceded by Charles Murphy	Democratic nominee for North Dakota Attorney General; 1962	Succeeded by Leonell W. Fraase
Preceded by Leonell W. Fraase	Democratic nominee for Lieutenant Governor of North Dakota; 1964, 1968	Succeeded by Wayne Sanstead
Political offices
Preceded by Frank A. Wenstrom	Lieutenant Governor of North Dakota; 1965–1969	Succeeded by Richard F. Larsen
