= Jean Guy =

American First Lady of North Dakota (1922-2013)

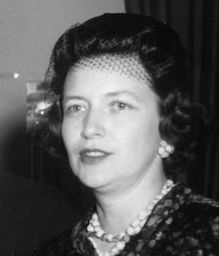

First Lady of North Dakota
- In role January 4, 1961 – January 2, 1973
- Governor: William L. Guy
- Preceded by: Pauline Davis
- Succeeded by: Grace Link

Personal details
- Born: Elizabeth Mason; September 8, 1922 Selfridge, North Dakota
- Died: July 5, 2013 (aged 90) Fargo, North Dakota
- Party: North Dakota Democratic-NPL
- Spouse: William L. Guy (1943-2013)
- Education: North Dakota Agricultural College

Elizabeth "Jean" Guy (September 8, 1922 – July 5, 2013) was an American First Lady of the U.S. state of North Dakota. The longest serving First Lady in North Dakota's history, she served from 1961 to 1973 during the tenure of her husband, former Governor William L. Guy, the longest-serving governor in the state's history. Described as a highly influential behind the scenes, Jean Guy has been credited with persuading William Guy to run for office, reviving the Democratic Party and the North Dakota Democratic-Nonpartisan League Party in the state during the mid-20th Century.

She later served as the President of the North Dakota State Board of Higher Education, which creates policy for the North Dakota University System, during the 1980s.

== Biography ==
Guy was born Elizabeth "Jean" Mason in Selfridge, North Dakota, in 1922 to Sidney and Clara (née Bond) Mason. She earned her Bachelor of Science in home economics from North Dakota Agricultural College (present-day North Dakota State University) in Fargo, North Dakota, in 1944. Mason married her husband, William Guy, at a wedding ceremony held in Fargo on January 30, 1943.

William Guy had served in the United States Navy during World War II. The couple moved to Amenia, North Dakota, after the war, where they raised five children.

Jean Guy has been credited with encouraging her husband to enter politics as a Democrat. William Guy had originally been persuaded to run for local office as a Republican by a precinct committeeman in Cass County. Though Guy began to collect signatures for his campaign, he continued to feel that he would fit in better with the Democratic Party, which was widely outnumbered in Cass County by Republican voters. He confided to his wife that, "I am interested in politics, but there’s no future in North Dakota in politics unless you’re a part of the Republican Party." Jean Guy reportedly replied that, "Well there could be a Democratic Party in North Dakota if people wouldn’t give up before they start." Jean Guy persuaded her husband to run, which revived the fortunes of the Democratic Party in North Dakota at the time. William Guy would serve in the North Dakota House of Representatives from 1959 to 1961 before being elected as North Dakota's longest-serving governor from 1961 to 1973. His election as Governor on the North Dakota Democratic-Nonpartisan League Party created the modern two-party system in North Dakota, which had previously been dominated by the Republican Party.

Jean Guy focused on public service, education and civic affairs after completing her tenure as First Lady. She served on the advisory board for the President of North Dakota State University. Guy became the chairperson of the Kennedy Memorial Center Foundation, based in Bismarck, since its creation in 1968. She was also a member of the board of directors for the Theodore Roosevelt Medora Foundation.

North Dakota Governor Arthur Link appointed Jean Guy to the North Dakota State Board of Higher Education (NDSBHE), which oversees the North Dakota University System, in 1979. She became President of the NDSBHE in 1985.

In March 2012, North Dakota Democrats elected Jean Guy, along with former North Dakota First Ladies Grace Link and Jane Sinner, as the party's three electors for the 2012 United States Presidential election.

Jean Guy suffered a stroke in June 2013. She died of complications of the stroke at the Sanford Palliative Care in Fargo, North Dakota, at the age of 90. Guy died just two months after the passing of her husband, former Governor William Guy, on April 26, 2013.

== See also ==
- Politics of North Dakota

Honorary titles
Preceded by Pauline Davis	First Lady of North Dakota; 1961 — 1973	Succeeded by Grace Link
