= 1974 United States Senate election in North Dakota =

- November 5, 1974
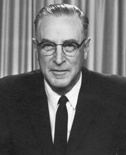

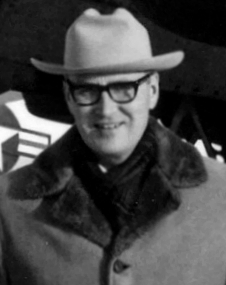
| Nominee | Milton Young | William L. Guy |
| Party | Republican | Democratic–NPL |
| Popular vote | 114,852 | 114,675 |
| Percentage | 48.45% | 48.37% |
- County results Young: 40–50% 50–60% 60–70% Guy: 40–50% 50–60% 60–70%
U.S. senator before election
Milton Young
Republican
Elected U.S. Senator
Milton Young
Republican

The 1974 United States Senate election in North Dakota was held November 5, 1974. Incumbent Republican U.S. Senator Milton Young was narrowly reelected to his sixth term, defeating Democratic-NPL candidate William L. Guy.

Only Young filed as a Republican, and the endorsed Democratic candidate was Guy, who had served as governor from 1961 to 1973 and had presumably left the office to seek the Senate seat. Young and Guy won the primary elections for their respective parties. Guy, who was a very popular governor throughout the state, and Young, who had a high approval rating as a senator, created the closest ever election for one of North Dakota's Senate seats. Young won by only 177 votes, and Guy subsequently retired from politics.

Two independent candidates, James R. Jungroth and Kenneth C. Gardner, also filed before the deadline. Jungroth's platform was based on his opposition to strip mining the state's coal reserves. Gardner later ran for the state's other seat in 1988 against then-incumbent Quentin Burdick.

== Election results ==
1974 United States Senate election in North Dakota
| Party | Candidate | Votes | % |
|---|---|---|---|
| Republican | Milton Young (incumbent) | 114,852 | 48.45% |
| Democratic | William L. Guy | 114,675 | 48.37% |
| Independent | James R. Jungroth | 6,679 | 2.82% |
| Independent | Kenneth C. Gardner | 853 | 0.36% |
| Majority | | 177 | 0.07% |
| Turnout | | 237,059 | 100.00% |
| Republican hold | | | |

== See also ==
- United States Senate elections, 1974 and 1975
