= Gil Herbel =

American politician

Member of the North Dakota House of Representatives from the 16th district
- In office December 1, 1998 – December 1, 2008
- Preceded by: Lynn Thompson
- Succeeded by: Robert Kilichowski

Personal details
- Born: February 12, 1940 (age 86) Langdon, North Dakota
- Party: Republican

Gil Herbel (born February 12, 1940) is an American politician who served in the North Dakota House of Representatives from the 16th district from 1998 to 2008.
