= Orville W. Hagen =

American politician

Orville "Ike" W. Hagen (September 26, 1915 – June 24, 2007) was a North Dakota Republican Party politician who served as the 27th lieutenant governor of North Dakota under Governor William Guy, and as the state's first North Dakota Commissioner of Labor from 1966 to 1986 when he lost his bid for re-election to Byron Knutson. He tried to run on the Republican Party ticket for Governor of North Dakota in 1980, but was defeated in the primary by Allen I. Olson.

Hagen was born on the family farm outside of Watford City, North Dakota. He was the son of Oscar W. Hagen (1884-1945) and Carrie (Scollard) Hagen (1886- 1961). He attended Dickinson State College. In 1939, he married Astrid Berg. Early in his career, he worked on his father's weeklynewspaper, the McKenzie Counter Leader and later the Watford (ND) Guide. He worked for the Williston (ND) Herald until 1946. He died at the age of 91 and was buried at Schafer Cemetery McKenzie County, North Dakota.

Party political offices
Preceded by Clarence P. Dahl	Republican nominee for Lieutenant Governor of North Dakota; 1960	Succeeded by Frank A. Wenstrom
Political offices
Preceded by Clarence P. Dahl	Lieutenant Governor of North Dakota; 1961–1963	Succeeded by Frank A. Wenstrom
Preceded by none	North Dakota Commissioner of Labor; 1967–1987	Succeeded by Byron Knutson
