= North Dakota State Cabinet =

The North Dakota State Cabinet is part of the executive branch of the Government of the U.S. state of North Dakota, consisting of the appointed heads of the North Dakota state executive departments. The State Cabinet has evolved into a major part of the State government.

== Current cabinet departments ==
The North Dakota State Cabinet, under current Governor Kelly Armstrong, consists of 16 departments each headed by an official appointed by the Governor.

- The North Dakota Department of Corrections and Rehabilitation – Headed by the Director of the department, it is responsible for the direction and administrative supervision, guidance, and planning of the adult and juvenile correctional facilities and programs within the state.
- Job Service North Dakota – Headed by the Executive Director, it is responsible for overseeing the state's job market, finding employment for its citizens, and assisting business in acquiring qualified workers.
- The North Dakota Department of Health - Headed by the State Health Officer, the department is charged with the protection and promotion of health of the citizens of North Dakota, and its mission is to prevent disease and injury and to assure conditions for good health, and to assure that North Dakota is a safe and healthy place to live.
- The North Dakota Information Technology Department – Headed by the Chief Information Officer, the department is responsible for providing the state with adequate technology support, and is charged with the development of software and network services for the state.
- The North Dakota Department of Commerce – Headed by the Commissioner of Commerce, charged with the development of the state's economy, as well as coordinating and focusing the state's economic development resources. The department's goals are to better life for North Dakotans by creating new wealth and broadening the state's economic base.
- The North Dakota Department of Financial Institutions – Headed by the Commissioner of Financial Institutions, the Department's mission is to maintain public confidence in North Dakota financial institutions by ensuring the financial industry operates in a safe and sound manner while complying with applicable rules and laws. It is responsible for the execution of all laws relating to state banks, trust companies, building and loan associations, mutual investment corporations, mutual savings corporations, banking institutions, other financial corporations and all credit unions of the state.
- The North Dakota Highway Patrol – Headed by the Superintendent, the Highway Patrol ensures safety on the state's highways.
- The North Dakota Indian Affairs Commission – Headed by the Executive Director of Indian Affairs, the commission assists Indian individuals and groups in the state.
- The North Dakota Department of Labor and Human Rights – Headed by the Commissioner of Labor, the department is responsible for enforcing the state's labor laws, and for educating the public about these laws. In addition, the department licenses employment agencies operating in North Dakota.
- The North Dakota Department of Human Services – Headed by the Executive Director, the department is responsible for providing comprehensive human resource services to all state agencies and employees, such as overseeing employee benefits and employment securities.
- The North Dakota Parks and Recreation Department – Headed by the Director, the department oversees the state's park and trail system, as well as recreational activities.
- The North Dakota Office of Management and Budget – Headed by the Director, the office's mission is to provide a range of products and services resulting in a well run government that meets the needs of the North Dakota citizens.
- The North Dakota National Guard – Headed by the Adjutant General, the National Guard provides ready units, individuals, and equipment to support the state and nation.
- The North Dakota Game and Fish Department – Headed by the Director, the department oversees the state's game and fish industry, regulates hunting and fishing licenses, and educates the public on safety relating to the outdoors.
- The North Dakota Securities Department – Headed by the Commissioner of Securities, the department regulates the sale of securities and franchises in North Dakota, protects the public by enforcing compliance with the state's laws, and provides investor education programs for all ages to improve the level of financial literacy in our state.
- The North Dakota Department of Transportation – Headed by the Director, the department is charged with providing an economical, and effective transportation network that safely moves people and goods.

== Current cabinet members ==
The current North Dakota State Cabinet, serving under Governor of North Dakota Kelly Armstrong, is as follows:

Office	Incumbent
Director of the Department of Corrections and Rehabilitation	Colby Braun
Executive Director of Job Service North Dakota	Patrick Bertagnolli
State Health Officer	Dr. Nizar Wehbi
Chief Information Officer	Corey Mock
Commissioner of Commerce	Chris Schilken
Commissioner of Financial Institutions	Lise Kruse
Superintendent of the North Dakota Highway Patrol	Col. Daniel Haugen
Executive Director of Indian Affairs	Brad Hawk
Commissioner of Labor and Human Rights	Nathan Svihovec
Executive Director of the Department of Human Services	Molly Herrington
Director of the Parks and Recreation Department	Cody Schulz
Director of the Office of Management and Budget	Joe Morrissette
Adjutant General	Major General Mitchell Johnson
Director of the Game and Fish Department	Jeb Williams
Commissioner of Securities	Karen Tyler
Director of Water Resources	Andrea Travnicek
Director of the North Dakota Department of Transportation	Ron Henke

== See also ==
- Government of North Dakota
- Cabinet of the United States
