= Khirbet Shema =

Archaeological site located in Israel at the foot of Mount Meron

- Teqoa of Galilee(?)
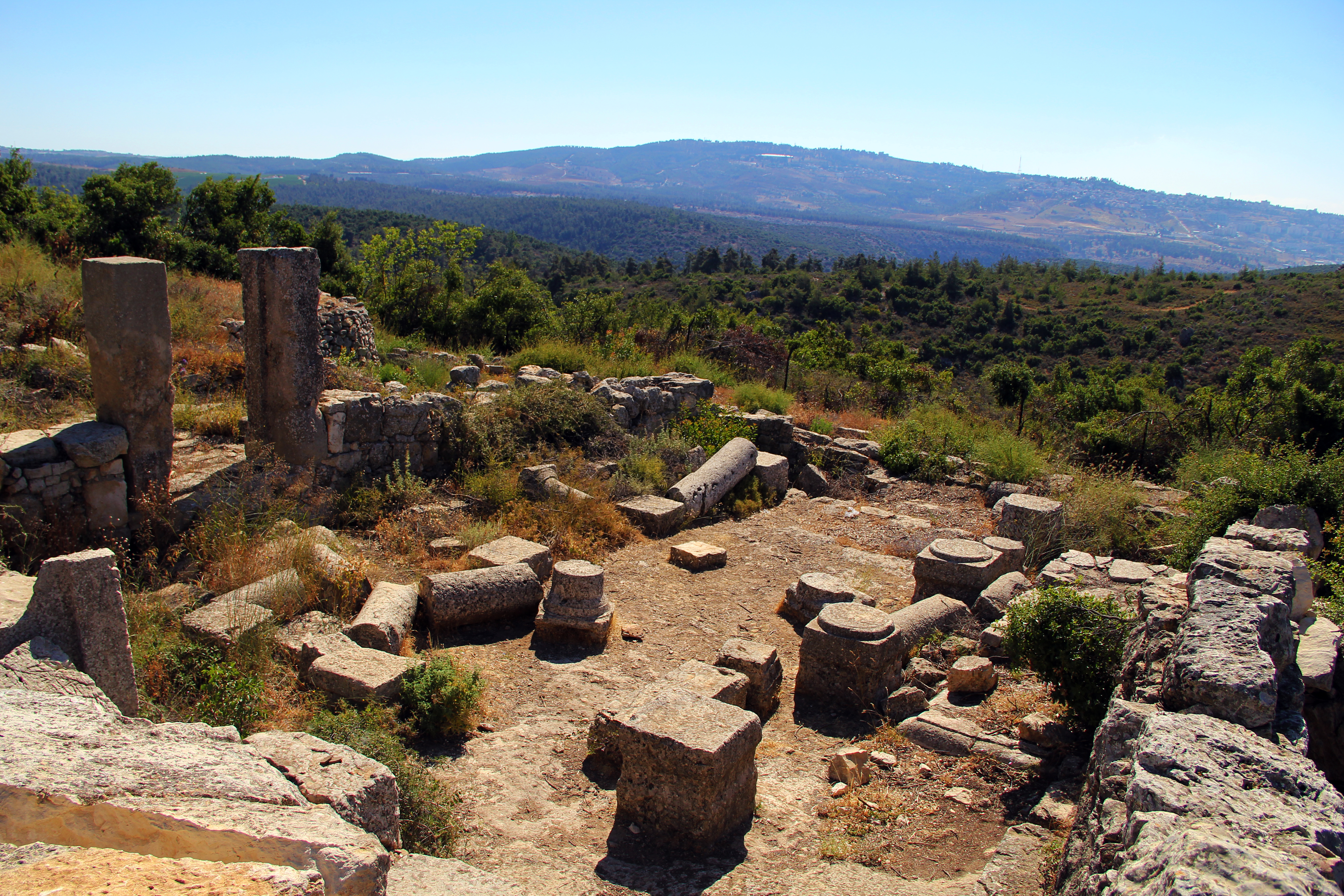
- The synagogue in Khirbet Shema

- Location within Israel
- 32°58′38″N 35°26′21″E
- Type: settlement, synagogue, mausoleum
- Periods: Roman to Byzantine period
- Cultures: Jewish
- Location: Israel
- Region: Northern District

History
- Built: 180 CE
- Abandoned: 417 CE

Site notes
- Excavation dates: 1970-1972
- Condition: In ruins

Khirbet Shema is an archaeological site located in Israel at the foot of Mount Meron. It features the ruins of a large Jewish village of the Roman and Byzantine periods, including the remains of an ancient synagogue and a mausoleum. It may be identified with the ancient Teqoa of Galilee.

== Identification ==
Several researchers have identified the site with the ancient Teqoa of Galilee (not to be confused with Teqoa, Judea), although no evidence has been discovered to verify this identification.

== The site ==
Khirbet Shema is the traditional burial site of Shammai, a contemporary and opponent of Hillel the Elder.The excavations conducted at the site in 1970-1971 revealed that has no archaeological evidence to this tradition.

=== Excavations ===
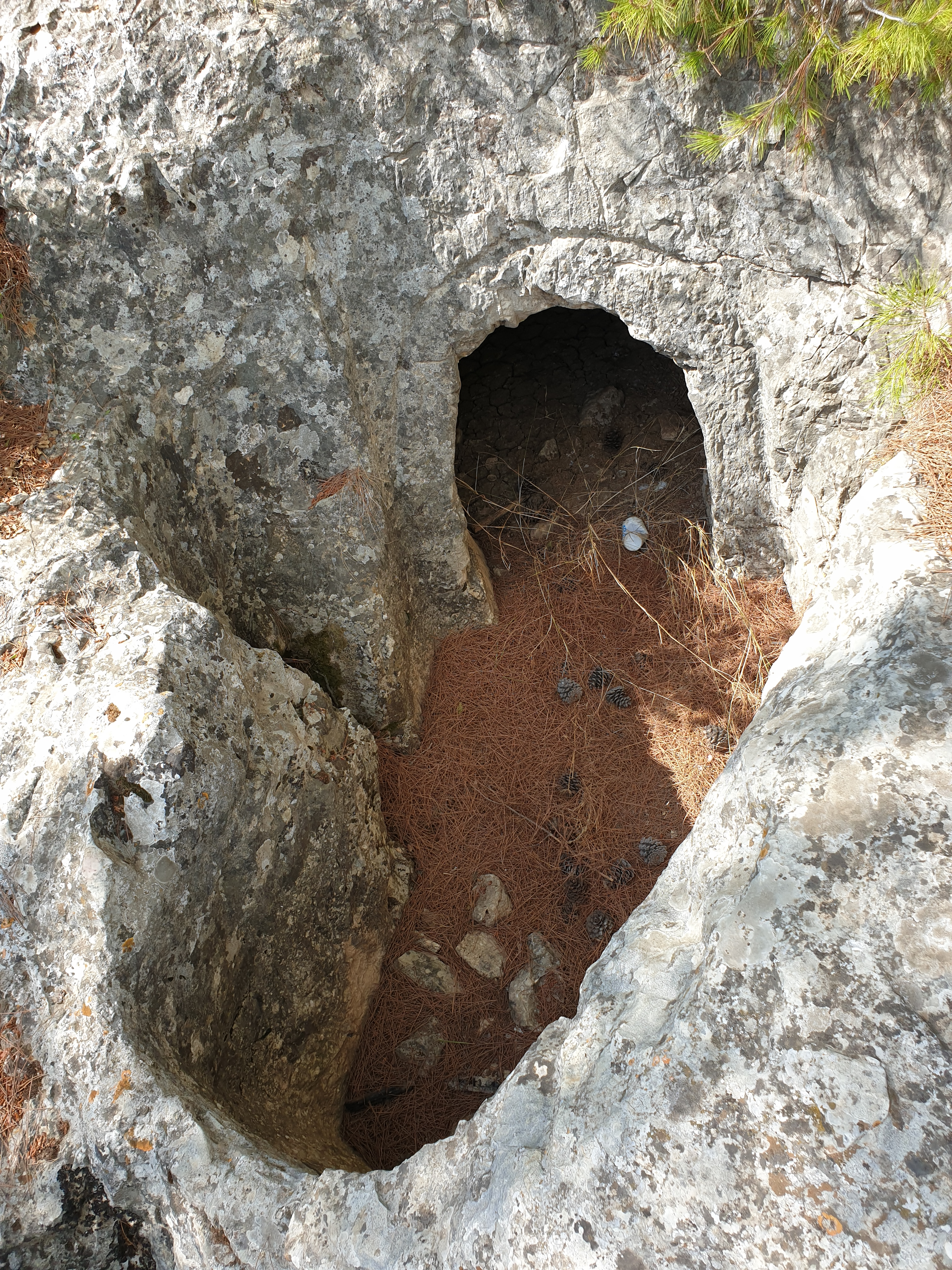
Entrance to Jewish rock-cut burial cave

American archaeologist Eric M. Meyers excavated the site from 1970 to 1972 on behalf of the American Schools of Oriental Research. The area recovered exceeded six acres.

Excavations have uncovered a large mausoleum, numerous tombs and an ancient synagogue. Additionally, their work included "uncovering adjacent buildings and surrounding parts of the village". Even by 1974, having worked with up to 80 people, no remnants of the synagogue's roof were found.

=== Analysis ===
Researchers have reviewed the "coins, glass, plaster, ceramic stone, bone, jewelry and some organic materials" found. Although "over 4,000 artifacts have been found in the excavations," there is little evidence of late Hellenistic colonization and the end of Roman times at the site.

The team's Co-head, Dr. James F. Strange, professor of biblical archeology at University of South Florida, indicated that the ruins of the synagogue show it to be unique, both for the area and time of construction. "There were several factors which led us to believe the building was quite unlike any other synagogue in that part of Palestine." Specific features he found noteworthy included "foundation walls .. nearly two feet thick, .. an entrance staircase .. stairs ten feet wide ... and a number of underground chambers."

The bulk of the coins suggest that this area was populated from 180 to around 417 CE, when "the village was destroyed by an earthquake."

== Shape of the synagogue ==
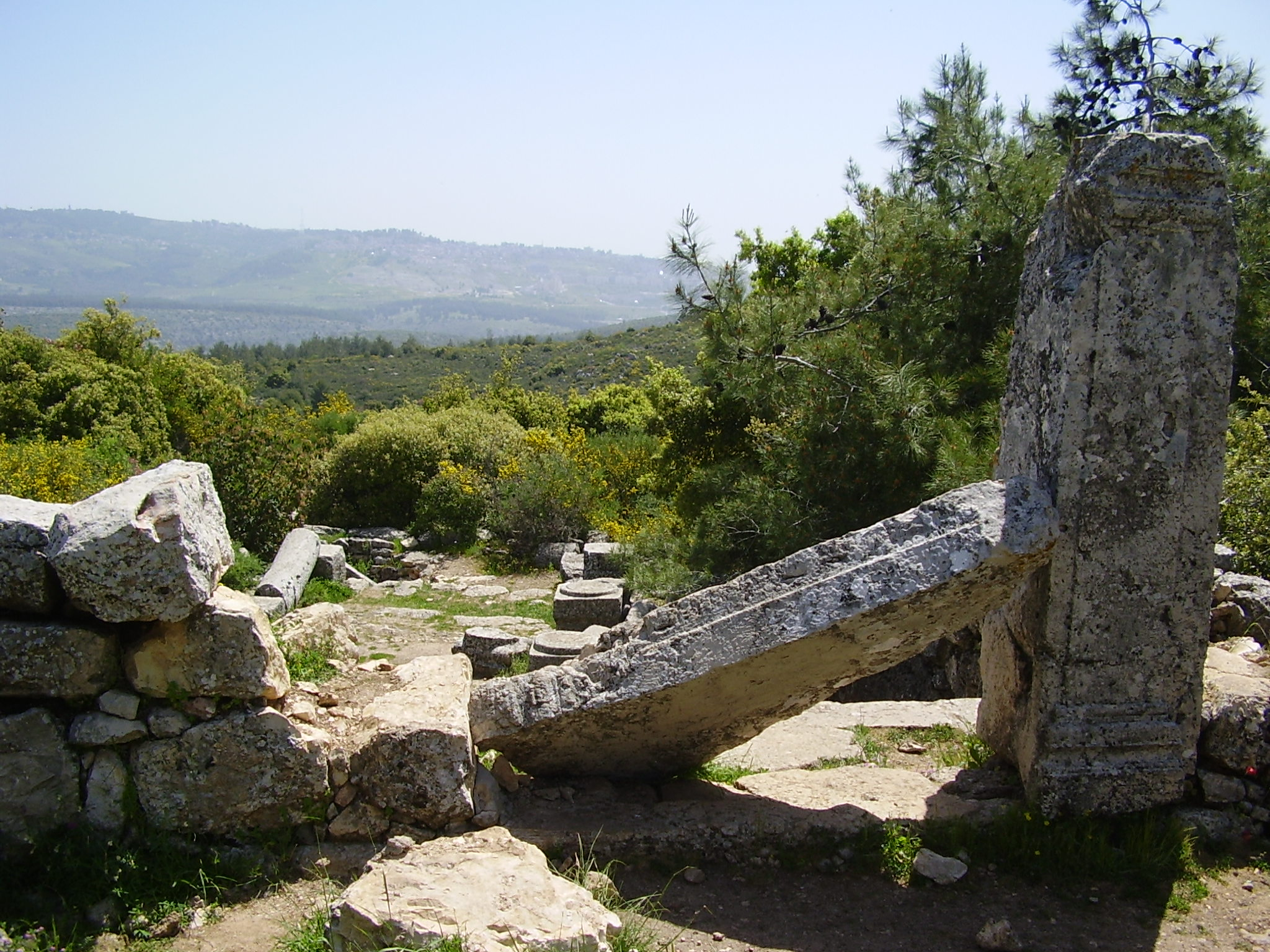
The synagogue in Khirbet Shema

Excavations done in "different sites in upper Galilee: Shema, Meiron, Gush Halav and Nabratein" helped uncover more information about the debate as to "whether the earliest Galilean synagogues .. were built on a so-called basilical plan .. as opposed to a broad building" known as "a broadhouse plan". Khirbet Shema and two other ancient synagogues excavated around the same time all were broadhouse.

== Bibliography ==
- Robert J. Bull, "Khirbet Shema", in: Israel Exploration Journal, 20: 232-34, 1970
- Robert J. Bull, "Khirbet Shema", in: American Journal of Archaeology, 75: 196-97, 1971
- Magness, Jodi (January 1997). "Synagogue Typology and Earthquake Chronology at Khirbet Shema', Israel". Journal of Field Archaeology. 24 (2): 211–220. doi:10.1179/009346997792208221.
- Eric M. Meyers:
  - "Horvat Shema ', the Settlement and the Synagogue", in: Qadmoniot, 5, 2: 58-61, 1972
  - Ancient Synagogue Excavations at Khirbet Shema, Upper Galilee, Israel, 1970–72, Cambridge: American Schools of Oriental Research, 1976
  - "Ancient Synagogues in Galilee: Their Religious and Cultural Significance", in: Biblical Archaeologist, 43, 2: 97-108, 1980
  - With James F. Strange, Archeology, the Rabbis, and Early Christianity, Nashville: Abingdon, 1981
  - "Stratigraphic and Ceramic Observations from the Medieval Strata of Khirbet Shema, Israel:
  - Assessment of the Value of Scientific Analysis", in: Bulletin of the American Schools of Oriental Research (en), 260: 61-69, 1985

== See also ==
- Ancient synagogues in the Palestine region - covers entire Palestine region/Land of Israel
  - Ancient synagogues in Israel - covers the modern State of Israel
- Archaeology of Israel
- List of synagogues in Israel

== Additional reading ==
=== Books ===
- Ancient Synagogue Excavations at Khirbet Shema', Upper Galilee, Israel 1970-72. (Annual of the American Schools of Oriental Research 42). Durham: Duke University Press, 1976. By A. Thomas Kraabel (With E.M. Meyers and J.F. Strange).

=== Articles ===
- "Khirbet Shema' et Meiron." (A. Thomas Kraabel) Revue biblique 80 (1973) 585-587 + P.. 34f.
- "Khirbet Shema' and Meiron." (A. Thomas Kraabel, With E. M. Meyers and J. F. Strange). Israel Exploration Journal 22 (1972) 174-176 + PI. 37f.
