= 1930 North Dakota gubernatorial election =

- November 4, 1930
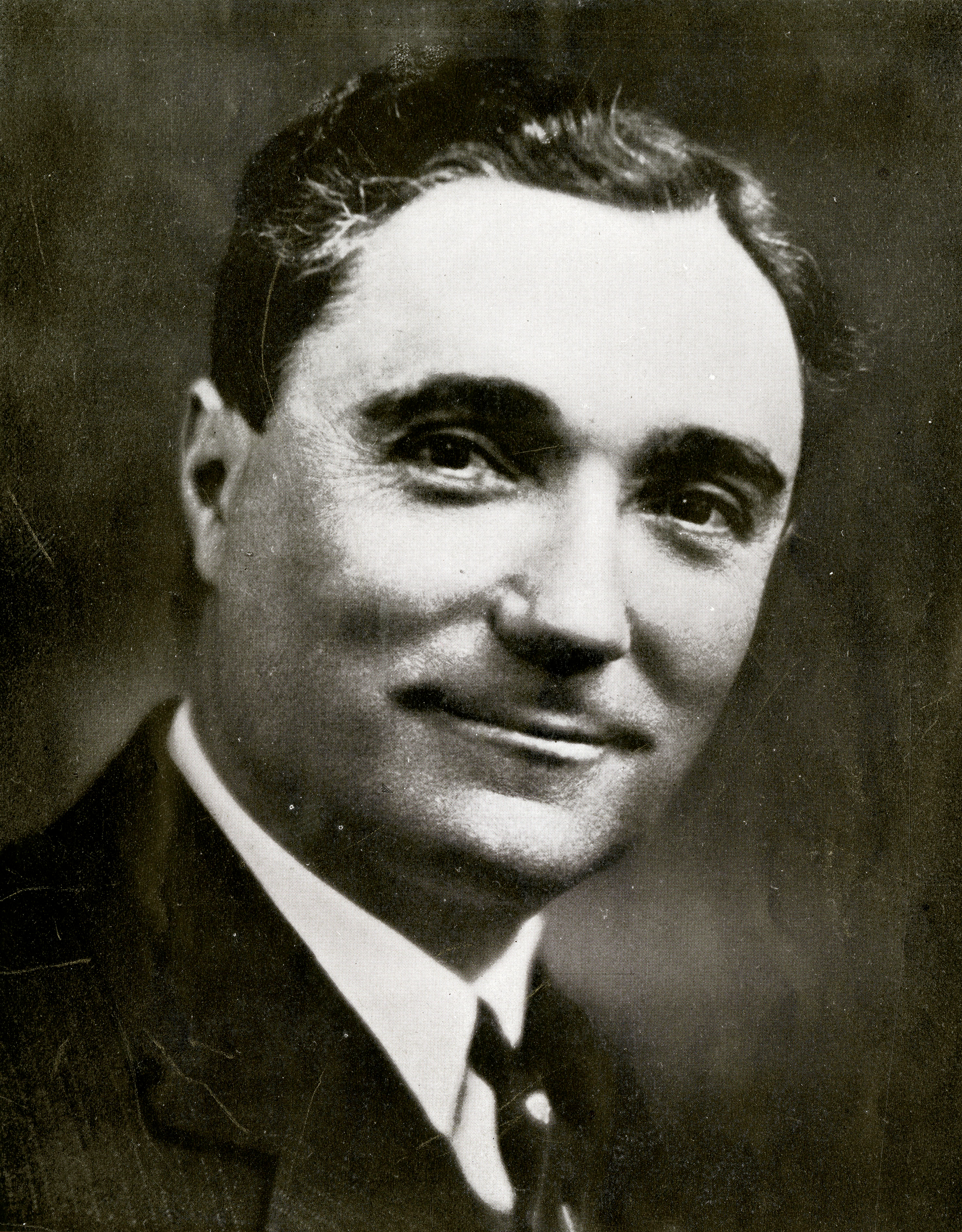

Nominee	George F. Shafer	Pierce Blewett
Party	Republican	Democratic
Popular vote	133,264	41,988
Percentage	73.62%	23.20%
- County results Shafer: 50–60% 60–70% 70–80% 80–90% Blewett: 40–50%
Governor before election
George F. Shafer
Republican
Elected Governor
George F. Shafer
Republican

The 1930 North Dakota gubernatorial election was held on November 4, 1930. Incumbent Republican George F. Shafer defeated Democratic nominee Pierce Blewett with 73.62% of the vote.

== Primary elections ==
Primary elections were held on June 25, 1930.

=== Democratic primary ===
==== Candidates ====
- Pierce Blewett, Mayor of Jamestown
- Frank O. Hellstrom, North Dakota State Penitentiary Warden
- Fred L. Anderson

==== Results ====
Democratic primary results
Party	Candidate	Votes	%
Democratic	Pierce Blewett	4,671	36.84
Democratic	Frank O. Hellstrom	4,587	36.18
Democratic	Fred L. Anderson	3,421	26.98
Total votes		12,679	100.00

=== Republican primary ===
==== Candidates ====
- George F. Shafer, incumbent Governor
- Everett H. Brant, State Senator

==== Results ====
Republican primary results
Party	Candidate	Votes	%
Republican	George F. Shafer (inc.)	105,371	60.34
Republican	Everett H. Brant	69,249	39.66
Total votes		174,620	100.00

== General election ==
=== Candidates ===
Major party candidates

- George F. Shafer, Republican
- Pierce Blewett, Democratic

Other candidates

- Pat J. Barrett, Communist

=== Results ===
1930 North Dakota gubernatorial election
Party	Candidate	Votes	%	±%
Republican	George F. Shafer (inc.)	133,264	73.62	▲17.12
Democratic	Pierce Blewett	41,988	23.20	▼19.95
Communist	Pat J. Barrett	5,754	3.18	N/A
Majority		91,276	50.43	▲35.83
Total votes		181,006	100.00	
Republican hold				
