= Lieutenant Governor of North Dakota =

Political office in North Dakota

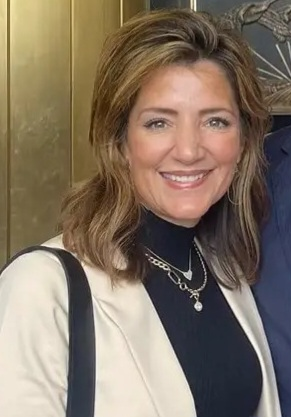
- Incumbent; Michelle Strinden since December 15, 2024
- North Dakota Office of the Governor
- Term length: 4 years, no term limit
- Inaugural holder: Alfred Dickey
- Formation: November 20, 1889
- Succession: First
- Website: Government website

The lieutenant governor of North Dakota is a political office in North Dakota. The lieutenant governor's duty is to preside as President of the Senate, and is responsible for legislative relations, the state budget and agribusiness development. In the event the office of the governor becomes vacant, the lieutenant governor assumes that office and appoints a replacement lieutenant.

The current lieutenant governor is Michelle Strinden.

Before 1974, the lieutenant governor of North Dakota was elected separately from the governor. To avoid hostile relations between a lieutenant governor and governor from different parties, the process was changed to where the governor and lieutenant governor are elected together on a joint ballot and are of the same party.

== Lieutenant governors of North Dakota ==
Parties

Democratic/Democratic-NPL (6) Republican (27) Republican/NPL (7)

#	Image	Lt. Governor	Term	Party	Governor(s) served under	Note
1		Alfred Dickey	1889–1891	Republican	John Miller (R)	
2		Roger Allin	1891–1893	Republican	Andrew H. Burke (R)	(Note: Served as Governor of North Dakota)
3		Elmer D. Wallace	1893–1895	Democratic-Independent	Eli C. D. Shortridge (D)	
4		John H. Worst	1895–1897	Republican	Eli C. D. Shortridge (D)	
5		Joseph M. Devine	1897–1898	Republican	Frank A. Briggs (R)	
6		David Bartlett	1901–1907	Republican	Frank White (R); Elmore Y. Sarles (R)	
7		Robert S. Lewis	1907–1911	Republican	John Burke (D)	
8		Usher L. Burdick	1911–1913	Republican	John Burke (D)	
9		Anton T. Kraabel	1913–1915	Republican	L. B. Hanna (R)	
10		John H. Fraine	1915–1917	Republican	L. B. Hanna (R)	
11		Anton T. Kraabel	1917–1919	Republican	Lynn Frazier (R)	
12		Howard R. Wood	1919–1923	Republican/NPL	Lynn Frazier (R); Ragnvald A. Nestos (R)	
13		Frank H. Hyland	1923–1925	Republican	Ragnvald A. Nestos (R)	
14		Walter Maddock	1925–1928	Republican/NPL	Arthur G. Sorlie (R)	
15		John W. Carr	1929–1933	Republican	George F. Shafer (R); William Langer (R)	
16		Ole H. Olson	1933–1934	Republican/NPL	William Langer (R) no lieutenant governor	
17		Walter Welford	1935	Republican/NPL	Thomas H. Moodie (D)	
18		Thorstein H. H. Thoresen	1937–1939	Republican/NPL	William Langer (R)	
19		Jack A. Patterson	1939–1941	Republican/NPL	John Moses (D)	
20		Oscar W. Hagen	1941–1943	Republican/NPL	John Moses (D)	
21		Henry Holt	1943–1944	Democratic	John Moses (D)	
22		Clarence P. Dahl	1945–1951	Republican	Fred G. Aandahl (R)	
23		Ray Schnell	1951–1953	Republican	Clarence Norman Brunsdale (R)	
24		Clarence P. Dahl	1953–1957	Republican	Clarence Norman Brunsdale (R)	
25		Francis Clyde Duffy	1957–1959	Republican	John E. Davis (R)	
26		Clarence P. Dahl	1959–1961	Republican	John E. Davis (R)	
27		Orville W. Hagen	1961–1963	Republican	William L. Guy (D)	
28		Frank A. Wenstrom	1963–1965	Republican	William L. Guy (D)	
29		Charles Tighe	1965–1969	Democratic-NPL	William L. Guy (D)	
30		Richard F. Larsen	1969–1973	Republican	William L. Guy (D)	
31		Wayne Sanstead	1973–1981	Democratic-NPL	Arthur A. Link (D)	
32		Ernest Sands	1981–1985	Republican	Allen I. Olson (R)	
33		Ruth Meiers	1985–1987	Democratic-NPL	George A. Sinner (D)	
34		Lloyd Omdahl	1987–1992	Democratic-NPL	George A. Sinner (D)	
35		Rosemarie Myrdal	1992–2000	Republican	Ed Schafer (R)	
36		Jack Dalrymple	2000–2010	Republican	John Hoeven (R)	
37		Drew Wrigley	2010–2016	Republican	Jack Dalrymple (R)	
38		Brent Sanford	2016–2023	Republican	Doug Burgum (R)	
39		Tammy Miller	2023–2024	Republican	Doug Burgum (R)	
40		Michelle Strinden	2024–present	Republican	Kelly Armstrong (R)	
