= Alice Olson =

American politician (1928–2010)

Member of the North Dakota House of Representatives
- In office December 1, 1972 – December 1, 1998
- Preceded by: Donald Halcrow
- Succeeded by: Robert Nowatzki
- Constituency: 11th district (1972‍–‍1992); 10th district (1992‍–‍1998)

Personal details
- Born: Alice Adele Sandgren; May 24, 1928 Winnipeg, Manitoba, Canada
- Died: February 21, 2010 (aged 81) Cavalier, North Dakota, United States
- Party: Republican
- Spouses: Keith Cox Olson (m. 1948; died 1981); Alfred Lawrence Byron (m. 1998)
- Children: 2
- Education: Aakers Business College
- Occupation: Farmer; politician

Alice Adele Sandgren Olson (May 24, 1928 – February 21, 2010) was a longtime member of the North Dakota House of Representatives. At her retirement in 1998, she was the second most senior member of that body, behind LeRoy Hausauer.

North Dakota House of Representatives
Preceded by Donald Halcrow	Member of the North Dakota House of Representatives; 1972–1998 from the 11th district (Pembina County and part of Walsh County), 1972–1992 from the 10th district (part of Cavalier County and part of Pembina County), 1992–1998	Succeeded by Robert Nowatzki
