= North Dakota Labor Commissioner =

Labor Commissioner of North Dakota
- Incumbent; Nathan Svihovec since December 2022
- Department of Labor and Human Rights
- Member of: State Cabinet
- Reports to: The governor
- Appointer: The governor
- Precursor: Commissioner of Agriculture and Labor
- Formation: 1966
- First holder: Orville W. Hagen
- Website: www.nd.gov/labor/

In the U.S. state of North Dakota, the commissioner of labor, commonly referred to as the labor commissioner, is an appointed official who heads the North Dakota Department of Labor and Human Rights. The present commissioner is Nathan Svihovec.

The commissioner of labor is responsible for a broad array of duties relating to employment and employment conditions in North Dakota.

== History ==
Originally, the Department of Labor was combined with the North Dakota Department of Agriculture and was collectively called the North Dakota Department of Agriculture and Labor until 1966 when the two agencies split. The agriculture commissioner's term was then extended from two years to four, and was placed on a party affiliated ballot, while the commissioner of labor was placed on a no party ballot. Since 1994, however, the labor commissioner has no longer been on the ballot, and is instead appointed by the governor of North Dakota. In 2013, the department was renamed the Department of Labor and Human Rights to reflect additional responsibilities that the legislature had assigned it in the intervening years, but the name of the position remains simply the labor commissioner, however; the formal title is Commissioner of Labor and Human Rights, to reflect the department's proper title.

== See also ==
- List of labor commissioners of North Dakota
