= Frank H. Hyland =

American politician (1881–1934)

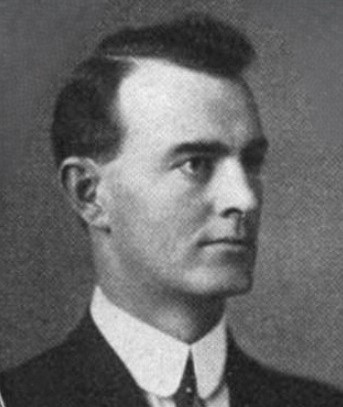
North Dakota Magazine, February 1911

Frank H. Hyland (September 14, 1881 – January 28, 1934) was a North Dakota Republican Party politician who served as the 13th lieutenant governor of North Dakota under Governor Ragnvald A. Nestos. Hyland also served in the North Dakota House from 1911 to 1912, and in the North Dakota Senate from 1913 to 1920 and 1929 to 1932.

== Notes ==
Political offices
Preceded by Howard R. Wood	Lieutenant Governor of North Dakota; 1923–1925	Succeeded by Walter Maddock
