= North Dakota Department of Agriculture =

Agency overview
- Formed: 1966
- Preceding agency: North Dakota Department of Agriculture and Labor
- Jurisdiction: Government of North Dakota
- Agency executive: Doug Goehring, Agriculture Commissioner
- Website: www.nd.gov/ndda/

The North Dakota Department of Agriculture is a part of the government of the U.S. state of North Dakota. The department fosters a healthy economic, environmental, and social climate for agriculture and the rural community through leadership, advocacy, education, regulation and other services.

== History ==
The department was established in 1966 when the North Dakota Department of Agriculture and Labor split into two separate entities, with the other being the North Dakota Department of Labor.

== See also ==
- North Dakota Agriculture Commissioner
