= Arthur G. Sorlie =

American politician

Arthur Sorlie
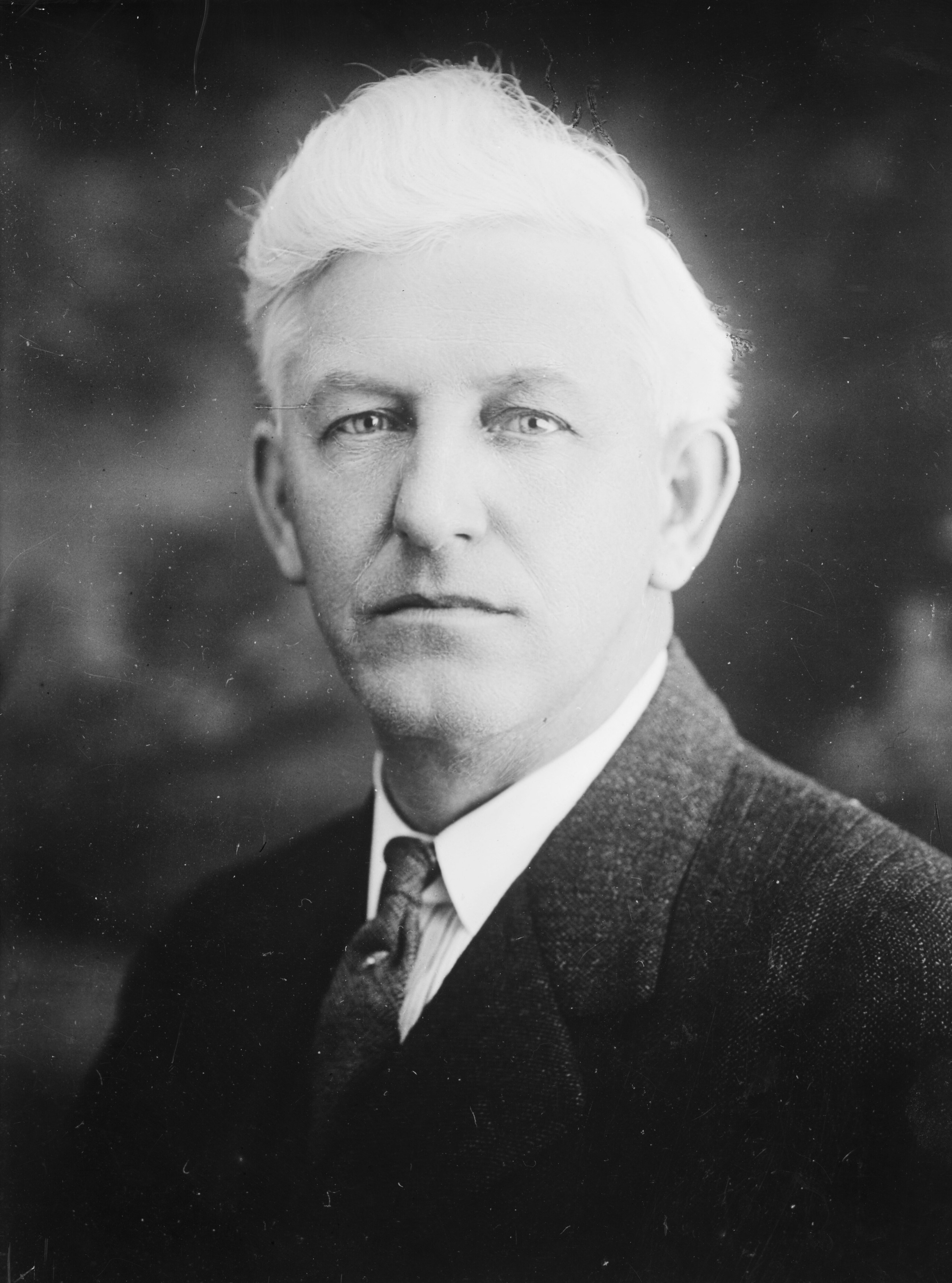
- Sorlie c. 1925–1928

14th Governor of North Dakota
- In office January 7, 1925 – August 28, 1928
- Lieutenant: Walter Maddock
- Preceded by: Ragnvald A. Nestos
- Succeeded by: Walter Maddock

Personal details
- Born: April 26, 1874 Albert Lea, Minnesota, U.S.
- Died: August 28, 1928 (aged 54) Bismarck, North Dakota, U.S.
- Party: Republican (NPL)
- Spouse(s): Jennie Odegard; Grace Hilleboe

Arthur Gustave Sorlie (April 26, 1874 – August 28, 1928) was an American businessman and politician who served as the 14th governor of North Dakota from 1925 until his death in 1928 at the age of 54.

== Biography ==
Sorlie was born in Albert Lea, Minnesota and resided in Grand Forks, North Dakota. He was the son of Iver Jacobson Sorlie (1835-1916) and Maren Oline Olson (1841-1917), both immigrants from Norway. He graduated from Luther Academy at Albert Lea, Minnesota in 1893. He worked in a bank and managed a general store in Buxton, North Dakota. In 1903, Sorlie opened a bread and cracker factory in Grand Forks, North Dakota. He became a successful businessman, owning car dealerships and gas stations. Sorlie first entered politics as a member of the Grand Forks City Council, a position he held two terms.

== Governor of North Dakota ==
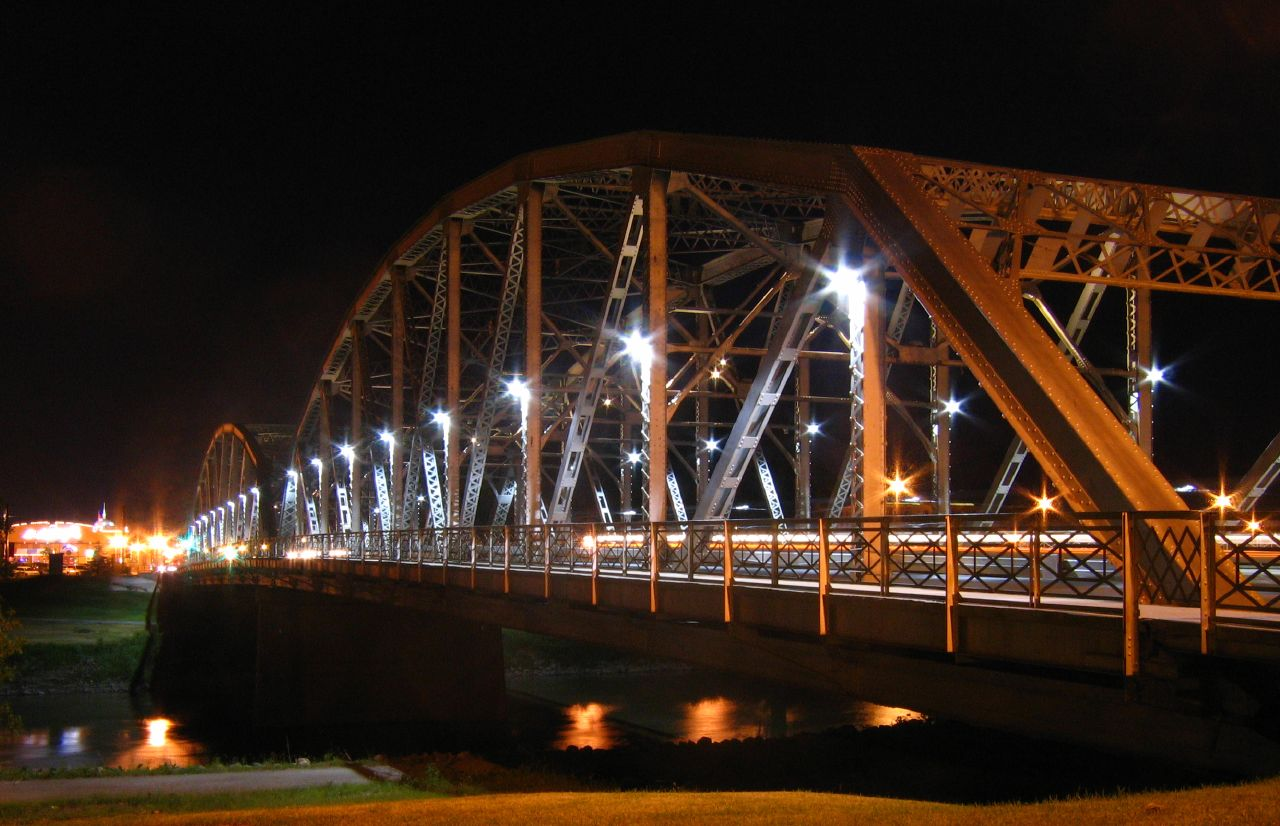
Sorlie Memorial Bridge

Sorlie defeated incumbent Ragnvald A. Nestos in the 1924 gubernatorial race after a tough fight, considering allegations stemmed that Sorlie was a sympathiser of the Ku Klux Klan. In an attempt to disprove this, prominent klansman and minister Halsey Ambrose published a letter stating he was not associated with the KKK in Grand Forks.

At that time, North Dakota politics involved the struggle between the Nonpartisan League (NPL) and the Independent Voters Association (IVA). The NPL membership (primarily farm and rural) bitterly opposed big business interests. They favored state-owned industries such as the Bank of North Dakota and the State Mill and Elevator. The IVA did not support state ownership of industry. They considered the NPL platform to be too radical and socialist.

When NPL-backed Sorlie replaced IVA candidate Nestos, the Nonpartisan League returned to power in the state. However, Sorlie did not have complete support from the League. Some (such as his own lieutenant governor, Walter Maddock) opposed Sorlie because he was a conservative businessman. During the 1927 legislative session, Sorlie's political enemies conspired to embarrass him by publicly investigating the State Mill and Elevator and calling for its removal from the governor's influence because of inefficient management.

== Personal life ==
In 1900, he was married to Jennie Odegard (1879-1918) with whom he had three children. After the death of his first wife, he married Grace Hilleboe (1889-1965) with whom he had an additional three children. When Governor Sorlie died in office in 1928, his body lay in state in the rotunda of the North Dakota State Capitol. He is buried in Memorial Park Cemetery in Grand Forks, Grand Forks County, North Dakota.

== Legacy ==
The Sorlie Memorial Bridge in Grand Forks, North Dakota was named in his memory. The Arthur G. Sorlie Papers were deposited in the Orin G. Libby Manuscript Collection in the Chester Fritz Library at the University of North Dakota.

== See also ==
- 1924 North Dakota gubernatorial election
- 1926 North Dakota gubernatorial election

Party political offices
Preceded by Ragnvald Nestos	Republican nominee for Governor of North Dakota; 1924, 1926	Succeeded by George F. Shafer
Political offices
Preceded by Ragnvald A. Nestos	Governor of North Dakota; 1925–1928	Succeeded by Walter Maddock
