= Mary Muehlen Maring =

American judge

Mary Muehlen Maring (born July 27, 1951) was a justice of the North Dakota Supreme Court. Mary Muehlen Maring was born and raised in Devils Lake, North Dakota. She graduated with B.A. degree in Political Science and German from Moorhead State University in 1972 and in 1975 a juris doctor degree from the University of North Dakota School of Law. She was appointed to the Supreme Court in 1996 and retired in 2013.

== Career ==
- 1975-1976 - law clerk for the Honorable Bruce C. Stone, Hennepin County District Court, Minneapolis, Minnesota
- 1976-1996 - entered private practice of law and practiced law in North Dakota and Minnesota
- 1996 - appointed by Governor Ed Schafer to the North Dakota Supreme Court
- 1998 - re-elected to a ten-year term
- 2008 - re-elected to a ten-year term
- 2013 - retired
