= Anton Kraabel =

American politician (1862–1934)

- Kraabel in a 1913 publication

9th Lieutenant Governor of North Dakota
- In office 1913–1915
- Governor: L. B. Hanna
- Preceded by: Usher L. Burdick
- Succeeded by: John H. Fraine

11th Lieutenant Governor of North Dakota
- In office 1917–1919
- Governor: Lynn Frazier
- Preceded by: John H. Fraine
- Succeeded by: Howard R. Wood

Personal details
- Born: October 16, 1862 Øyer Municipality, Oppland, Norway
- Died: June 17, 1934 (aged 71) Circle, Montana, U.S.
- Resting place: Clifford Cemetery, Clifford, North Dakota, U.S.
- Party: Republican
- Relatives: A. Thomas Kraabel (grandson)

Anton T. Kraabel (October 16, 1862 – June 17, 1934) was a North Dakota Republican Party politician who served as the ninth and 11th lieutenant governor of North Dakota under Governors L. B. Hanna and Lynn Frazier respectively.

Kraabel also served in the North Dakota House from 1903 to 1904 and in the North Dakota Senate from 1905 to 1908. He was the grandfather of American scholar A. Thomas Kraabel.

== Early life ==
Anton T. Kraabel was born in 1862 in Øyer Municipality which is located in the Gudbrandsdal valley in Oppland county, Norway. When Kraabel was four years old, his family including his parents, two brothers and three sisters emigrated to the United States and settled near Coon Valley in southwestern Wisconsin. Two sisters were born to the family afterwards. At the age of sixteen, Kraabel started supporting himself by working on farms and in a sawmill. He later moved to North Dakota where he worked as a peddler, as a hotel manager and a lumber yard manager.

Eventually, he settled in Clifford, North Dakota and began his career as a manager of a general store. He married Maren Oline Oswald in 1892, and they had seven children; three girls and four boys. In 1899, along with several others, he started the Clifford Bank.

== Political career ==
After settling in North Dakota, Kraal became involved in local, county and state politics, beginning as township clerk in 1888 and subsequently as township treasurer. He served in the North Dakota Legislative Assembly from 1903 to 1908; first in the House, and then in the Senate. He was elected Lieutenant Governor of North Dakota in 1912, but was defeated in the 1914 Republican Primary. He ran again for the seat in 1916, and served for another term. In 1918, however, he once again lost the primary for his party. After his political career, he served as a chair and member of several boards. He helped to organize the Traill County Telephone Company and was its president for twelve years.

== Death ==
Kraabel died at the age of 71 in 1934 in Circle, Montana. He is interred at Clifford Cemetery in Clifford, North Dakota.

Political offices
Preceded by Usher L. Burdick	Lieutenant Governor of North Dakota; 1913–1915	Succeeded by John H. Fraine
Preceded by John H. Fraine	Lieutenant Governor of North Dakota; 1917–1919	Succeeded by Howard R. Wood
