= A. Thomas Kraabel =

American scholar and educator

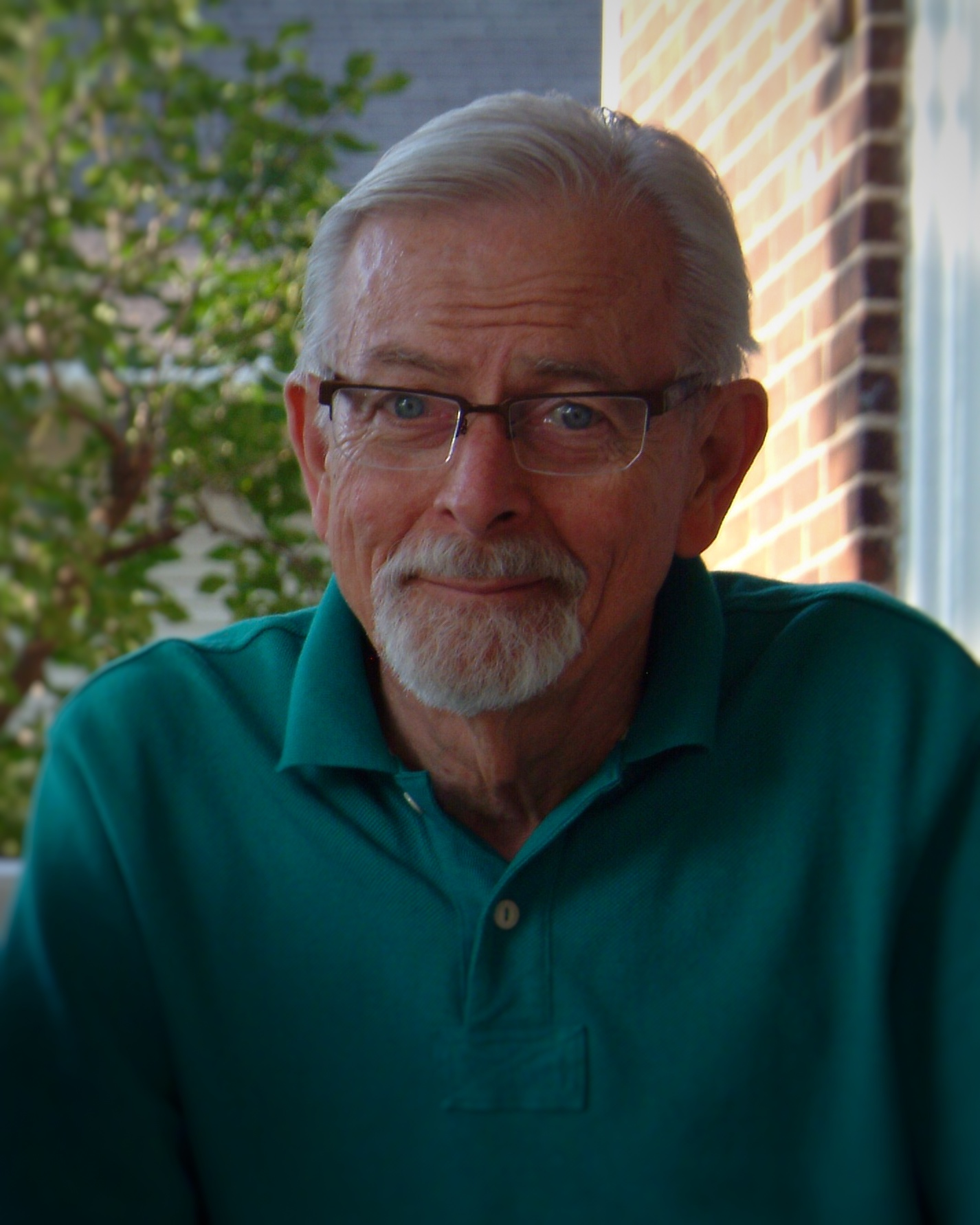
- A Thomas Kraabel Decorah Iowa 2008
- Born: Alf Thomas Kraabel; November 4, 1934; Portland, Oregon, U.S.
- Died: November 2, 2016 (aged 81); Decorah, Iowa, U.S.
- Occupations: Scholar, professor, pastor

Academic background
- Education: University of Iowa; Luther College; Harvard University

Academic work
- Discipline: Classical, medieval
- Institutions: Duke University; University of Minnesota; University of Oxford; Luther College
- Main interests: Hellenistic period, Judaism

Alf Thomas Kraabel (November 4, 1934 – November 2, 2016) was an American classics scholar and educator who worked extensively in Greek and Hellenistic Judaic studies. He served as a faculty member in the classics department at the University of Minnesota from 1963 to 1983, and served as the Dean of Luther College in Iowa before retiring in 2000.

== Early life ==
A. Thomas Kraabel was born Alf Thomas Kraabel in Portland, Oregon, on November 4, 1934, the first child of Alf M. and Marie (née Swensen) Kraabel, both natives of North Dakota.

He attended schools in Oregon, Minnesota, and California, graduating from Oakland Technical High School in Oakland, California.

== Education ==
Kraabel excelled in the study of Latin in high school and majored in classical languages and literature during his four years of study at Luther College in Decorah, Iowa. Following completion of the B.A. degree in 1956, he continued the study of classics at the University of Iowa for two years with the support of a Danforth Graduate Fellowship, earning the master of arts degree in 1958.

In the three years from 1958-61 Kraabel studied theology at Luther Theological Seminary in St. Paul, Minnesota. During that time, he offered instruction in New Testament Greek for seminary students. On completion of the B.Th. degree in 1961, he was ordained as a Lutheran pastor and served as assistant pastor of Our Saviour's Lutheran Church in Minneapolis for two years.

In 1963, Kraabel began a doctoral degree program in New Testament and Early Christian Literature at Harvard Divinity School. Harvard University awarded him the Th.D. degree in 1968. While working on that degree he received a Rockefeller Doctoral Fellowship in Religion and the Harvard Divinity School's Pfeiffer Fellowship in Archaeology. He also served as assistant in Greek and lecturer in New Testament at Episcopal Theological Seminary, Cambridge, Massachusetts, in 1966-67.

During his study at Harvard, Kraabel developed a special interest in Hellenistic Judaism. His research topics centered on the character of Judaism in the Roman Empire and its relevance for the understanding and description of early Christianity. His service as research assistant to Erwin R. Goodenough, a distinguished scholar in that subject area, both grew out of this interest and nurtured it. The interest continued in his experience as a field archaeologist, in 1966, for the Harvard-Cornell Archaeological Exploration of the site of ancient Sardis in Turkey. The ancient synagogue at that site became a major topic of his research both during and following that experience in the field.

== Career ==
In the fall semester of 1967, Kraabel began his teaching career as a member of the faculty of the Department of Classics at the University of Minnesota. He enjoyed the rank of full professor in that department from 1976–82, including three years (1978–81) as chairman of the department. He also served as chairman of religious studies from 1969-76. While on the University of Minnesota faculty, Kraabel spent the academic year 1977-78 as a visiting fellow at Mansfield College, Oxford University, England, and some months in 1981 as a visiting fellow at Wolfson College, Oxford.

In 1979, he collaborated with Estelle S. Brettman on the international panel "Diaspora Judaism Under the Roman Empire: Recent Archaeological Evidence," at the American Institute of Archaeology's Annual Conference in Boston, Massachusetts.

In January 1983, Luther College in Decorah, Iowa, named Kraabel vice-president and dean of the college, as well as professor of religion and classics. He continued in this position through the 1995-1996 academic year. Subsequently, he taught religion and classics at the college until his retirement at the end of the 1999-2000 academic year. In 1988, Luther College named him to an endowed professorial chair, Qualley Professor of Classics, a position he occupied until his retirement.

From 1969-73 Kraabel was associate director, with Eric Meyers of Duke University, of the Joint Expedition to Khirbet Shema', Israel, an archaeological project of the American Schools of Oriental Research. Institutional partners in the project were Duke, University of Minnesota, Harvard, Princeton, Luther College, Dropsie University, and the Smithsonian Institution. He also served as pastor at Our Saviour's Lutheran Church in Minnesota from 1961 to 1963.

== Death ==
Kraabel died on November 2, 2016, in Decorah, Iowa, after a twenty-eight year long battle with Parkinson's disease.

== Works ==
=== Books ===
- The Future of Early Christianity: Essays in Honor of Helmut Koester. Edited with B. A. Pearson, G. W. E. Nickelsburg and N. R. Petersen. Minneapolis: Fortress Press, 1991.
- Goodenough on the Beginnings of Christianity. Brown Judaic Studies 212. Atlanta: Scholars Press, 1990.
- Ancient Synagogue Excavations at Khirbet Shema', Upper Galilee, Israel 1970-72. (Annual of the American Schools of Oriental Research 42). Durham: Duke University Press, 1976. (With E.M. Meyers and J. F. Strange).

=== Articles ===
- "Immigrants, Exiles, Expatriates, and Missionaries," in Religious Propaganda and Missionary Competition in the New Testament World. Ovum Testamentum (Vol. 74), 1994.
- "Judaism at Sardis," in A. R. Seager et al. The Synagogue and Its Setting. Archaeological Exploration of Sardis. Cambridge: Harvard University Press (forthcoming).
- "Christianity at Sardis," in Hans Buchwald et al. The Churches of Sardis. Archaeological Exploration of Sardis. Cambridge: Harvard University Press (forthcoming).
- "The God-fearers meet the Beloved Disciple," in The Future of Early Christianity: Essays in Honor of Helmut Koester. Edited by B. A. Pearson, A. T. Kraabel, N. R. Peterson and G. W. E. Nickelsburg. Minneapolis: Fortress Press, 1991.
- "The Myth of Greece and the Liberal Arts." Inaugural Lecture, Orlando W. Qualley Chair of Classical Languages. Decorah, Iowa, 1989.
- "The Synagogue at Sardis: Jews and Christians." Pages 62–73 in Sardis: Twenty-Seven Years of Discovery. Papers Presented ... at the Oriental Institute, March 21, 1987. Edited by Eleanor Guralnick. Chicago, 1987.
- "Unity and Diversity Among Diaspora Synagogues." Pages 49–60 in The Synagogue in Late Antiquity. Edited by Lee I. Levine. A Centennial Publication of The Jewish Theological Seminary of America. Philadelphia: The American Schools of Oriental Research, 1987.
- "Archaeology, Iconography, and Nonliterary Written Remains." Pages 175-210 in Early Judaism and its Modern Interpreters. Edited by R. A. Kraft and G. W. E. Nickelsburg. Vol. II of The Bible and its Modern Interpreters. Edited by Douglas A. Knight. A Society of Biblical Literature Centennial Publication. Scholars Press, Atlanta/Fortress Press, Philadelphia, 1986. (With E. M. Meyers).
- "The God-Fearers—A Literary and Theological Invention?" Biblical Archaeology Review 12 (1986) 46-53, 64 (with R. S. MacLennan). With responses by Robert F. Tannenbaum (54-57) and Louis H. Feldman (59-63, 64-69).
- "Greeks, Jews, and Lutherans in the Middle Half of Acts." Pages 147-57 in Christians Among Jews and Gentiles: Essays in Honor of Krister Stendahl on His Sixty-Fifth Birthday. Edited by G. W. E. Nickelsburg with G. W. MacRae, S. J. Philadelphia: Fortress, 1986 (=Harvard Theological Review 79, 1-3).
- "Synagoga caeca. Systematic Distortion in Gentile Interpretations of Evidence for Judaism in the Early Christian Period." Pages 219-246 in To See Ourselves As Others See Us: Christians. Jews. "Others" in Late Antiquity. Edited by Jacob Neusner and Ernest S. Frerichs. Chico, CA: Scholars Press, 1985.
- "New Evidence of the Samaritan Diaspora has been Found on Delos." Biblical Archaeologist 47 (1984) 44-46.
- "Impact of the Discovery of the Sardis Synagogue." Pages 178-90 in G. M. A. Hanfmann, Sardis from Prehistoric to Roman Times. Cambridge MA: Harvard University Press, 1983.
- "The Roots of Christmas," Dialog 21 (1982) 274-80.
- "The Excavated Synagogues of Late Antiquity from Asia Minor to Italy." XVI Internationaler Byzantinisten-Kongress, Akten II/2 = Jahrbuch der Osterreichischen Byzantinistik 32.2 (1982) 227-36.
- "The Roman Diaspora: Six Questionable Assumptions." Pages 445-464 in Essays in Honour of Yigael Yadin. Edited by G. Vermes and J. Neusner (Journal of Jewish Studies 3.1-2, 1982).
- "The Disappearance of the 'God-Fearers'." Numen 28 (1981) 113-126.
- "Social Systems of Six Diaspora Synagogues." Pages 79–91 + fig. 19 in Ancient Synagogues: The State of Research. Edited by J. Gutman. Chico, CA: Scholars Press, 1981.
- "The Diaspora Synagogue: Archaeological and Epigraphic Evidence since Sukenik." Pages 477-510, one plan, one plate, in Aufstieg und Niedergang der römischen Welt II.19. Edited by H. Temporini and W. Haase. Berlin: de Gruyter, 1979. Excerpted and reprinted in Hebrew, pages 193-198 in The Ancient Synagogue: Selected Studies. Edited by Zeev Safrain. Jerusalem: Zalman Shazar Center for Jewish History, 1986.
- "Paganism and Judaism: The Sardis Evidence." Pages 13–33 in Paganisme, Judaisme, Christianisme: Influences et affrontements dans le mond antique. Melanges offerts a Marcel Simon. Edited by A. Benoit, M. Philonenko, and C. Vogel. Paris, 1979.
- "Jews in Imperial Rome: More Archaeological Evidence from an Oxford Collection" Journal of Jewish Studies (1979) 41-58.
- "The Open University, The Myth of God Incarnate and World Religious Pluralism." Dialog 17 (1978) 189-195.
- "The Shalom Christians: Requiescant in pace." Dialog 15 (1977) 8-10.
- "Synagogues, Ancient." New Catholic Encyclopedia, Supplement 1967-74, 16: 436-439, one plate. New York: McGraw-Hill, 1974.
- "Khirbet Shema' et Meiron." Revue biblique 80 (1973) 585-587 + P.. 34f.
- "Archaeology and Rabbinic Tradition at Khirbet Shema': 1970 and 1971 Campaigns." Biblical Archaeologist 25 (1972) 1-31. (With E. M. Meyers and J. F. Strange).
- "Khirbet Shema' and Meiron." Israel Exploration Journal 22 (1972) 174-176 + PI. 37f. (With E. M. Meyers and J. F. Strange).
- "Melito the Bishop and the Synagogue at Sardis: Text and Context." Pages 77-85 in Studies Presented to George M. A. Hanfmann. Edited by D. G. Mitten, J. G. Pedley, and J. A. Scott. Fogg Art Museum, Harvard University, Monographs in Art and Archaeology 2. Cambridge: Fogg Art Museum, 1971.
- "Khirbet Shema' (Meiron)." Revue biblique 78 (1971) 418f. + PI. 16f. With E. M. Meyers).
- "Hypsistos and the Synagogue at Sardis." Pages 81-93 in Greek, Roman and Byzantine Studies 10 (1969).
- "Paul and the Hellenization of Christianity." Pages 23-68 in Religion In Antiquity: Essays in Memory of Erwin Ramsdell Goodenough. (Supplements to Numen 14). Edited by Jacob Neusner. Leiden: Brill, 1968. (With E. R. Goodenough).

== See also ==
- Anton Kraabel
- Hellenistic Judaism
