= Robert Kilichowski =

American politician

Member of the North Dakota House of Representatives from the 16th district
- In office December 1, 2008 – December 1, 2012
- Preceded by: Gil Herbel
- Succeeded by: Ben W. Hanson
- In office December 1, 1992 – December 1, 1994

Personal details
- Born: March 20, 1950 (age 76) Grafton, North Dakota
- Party: Democratic

Robert Kilichowski (born March 20, 1950) is an American politician who served in the North Dakota House of Representatives from the 16th district from 1992 to 1994 and from 2008 to 2012.
