= George F. Shafer =

American politician (1888–1948)

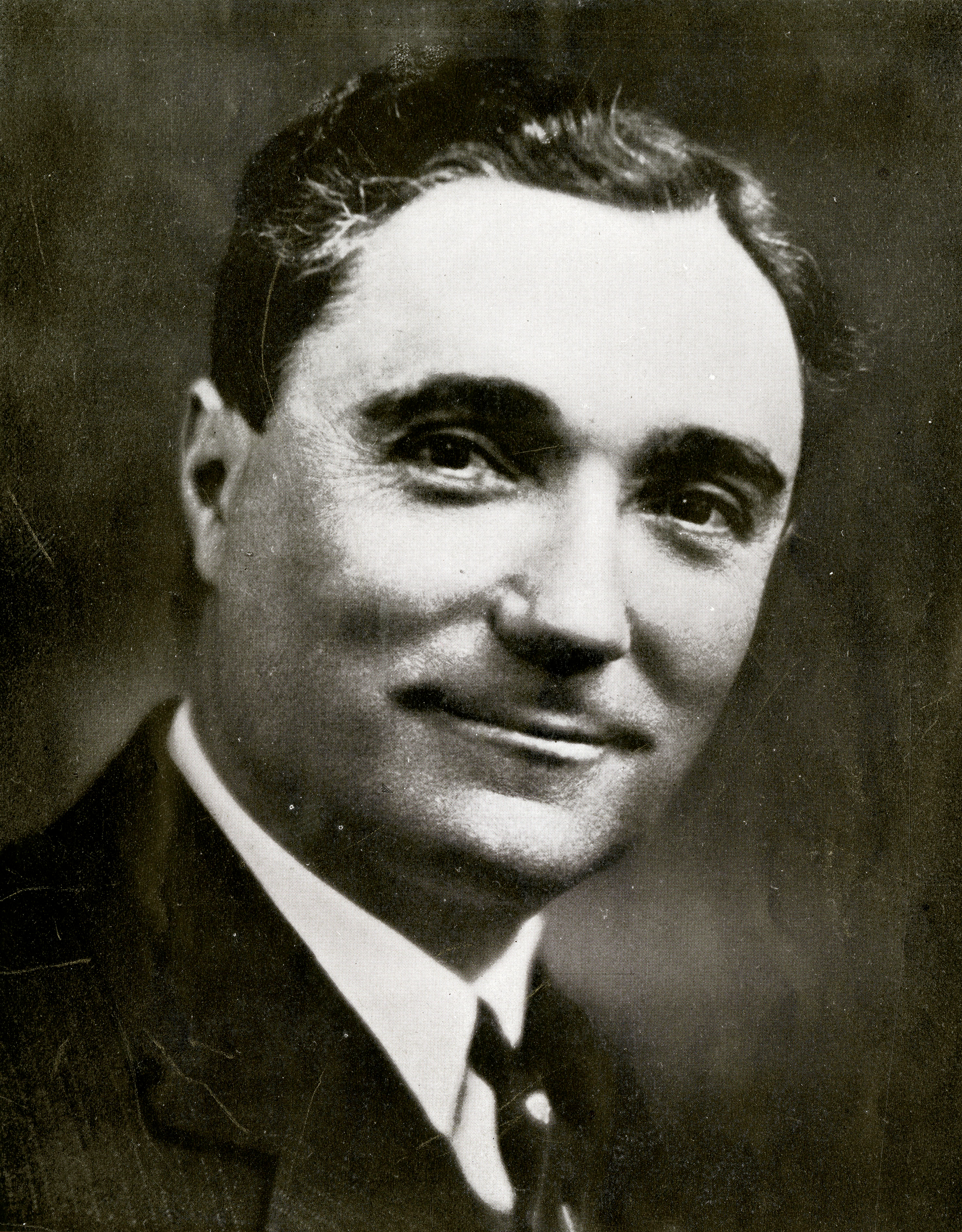

16th Governor of North Dakota
- In office January 9, 1929 – December 31, 1932
- Lieutenant: John W. Carr
- Preceded by: Walter Maddock
- Succeeded by: William Langer

13th Attorney General of North Dakota
- In office 1923–1928
- Governor: Ragnvald Nestos; Arthur G. Sorlie
- Preceded by: Sveinbjorn Johnson
- Succeeded by: James Morris

Personal details
- Born: George Frederick Shafer; November 23, 1888 Mandan, Dakota Territory
- Died: August 13, 1948 (aged 59) Bismarck, North Dakota
- Party: Republican (IVA)

George Frederick Shafer (November 23, 1888 – August 13, 1948) was an American politician who served as the 16th governor of North Dakota from 1929 to 1932.

== Early life ==
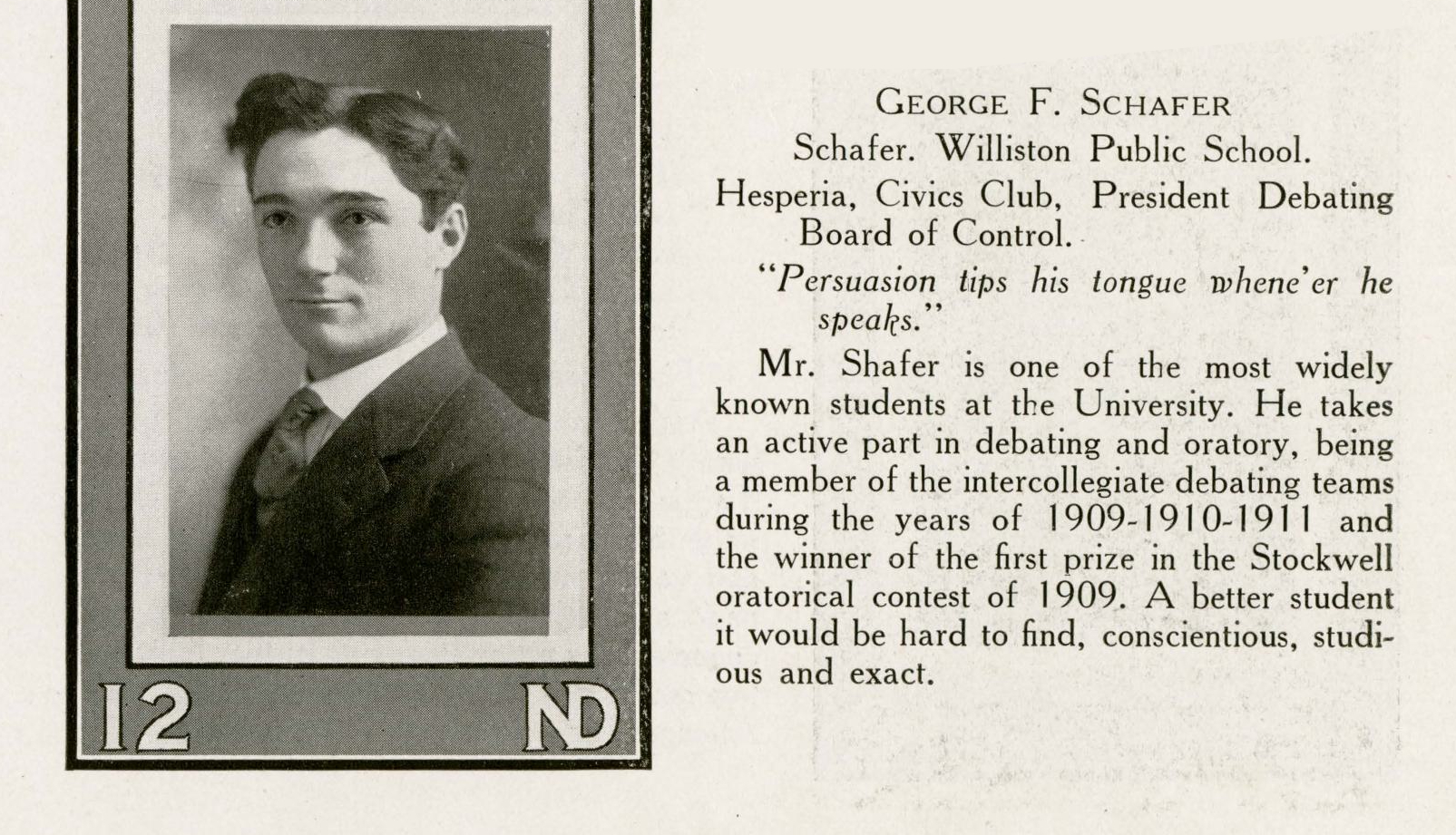
Shafer in the University of North Dakota yearbook, 1912

Shafer was educated in Mandan's public school system and attended the University of North Dakota. He married Frances Kellog on September 1, 1915, and they had three sons, George F. Jr., Richard K., and Charles D.; and one daughter, Virginia H. McCormick.

== Career ==
Shafer pursued a career in politics and became the State's Attorney for McKenzie County from 1915 to 1919. Serving as the Assistant Attorney General from 1921 to 1923, he took on a more prominent role in 1923 when he became the North Dakota Attorney General. He served this position until 1929, after defeating incumbent Walter Maddock in the 1928 gubernatorial election. He served as the 16th governor of North Dakota from 1929 to 1933. During his term, many profound events in the history of North Dakota occurred. The most severe problems facing the state during Shafer's administration were drought and low prices for agricultural products. To his credit, the State Mill and Elevator showed a good profit for the state under Shafer's direction, despite the weather and economic conditions. In 1930, the state capitol (former territorial capitol) burned down. A capital commission was formed to oversee the design and construction of the new capitol, and he was at the groundbreaking ceremony in 1932.

== Death ==
Shafer retired from public life after losing the Republican primary election for U.S. Senate against incumbent Gerald P. Nye in 1932. He died in Bismarck, North Dakota, on August 13, 1948, at the age of 59. He is buried at Saint Mary's Cemetery in Bismarck, North Dakota.

Party political offices
Preceded by Sveinbjorn Johnson	Republican nominee for North Dakota Attorney General; 1922, 1924, 1926	Succeeded by James Morris
Preceded by Arthur G. Sorlie	Republican nominee for Governor of North Dakota; 1928, 1930	Succeeded by William Langer
Legal offices
Preceded by Sveinbjorn Johnson	Attorney General of North Dakota; 1923–1928	Succeeded by James Morris
Political offices
Preceded by Walter Maddock	Governor of North Dakota; 1929–1932	Succeeded by William Langer
