= William L. Guy =

American politician (1919–2013)

William Guy
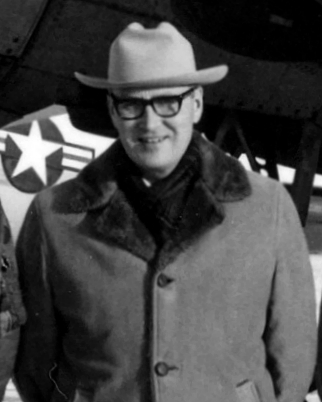
- Guy in 1968

Chair of the National Governors Association
- In office July 4, 1966 – October 16, 1967
- Preceded by: John Reed
- Succeeded by: John Volpe

26th Governor of North Dakota
- In office January 4, 1961 – January 2, 1973
- Lieutenant: Ike Hagen; Frank Wenstrom; Charles Tighe; Richard Larsen
- Preceded by: John Davis
- Succeeded by: Art Link

Member of the North Dakota House of Representatives
- In office 1959–1961

Personal details
- Born: William Lewis Guy; September 30, 1919 Devils Lake, North Dakota, U.S.
- Died: April 26, 2013 (aged 93) West Fargo, North Dakota, U.S.
- Party: Democratic
- Spouse: Jean Mason (1943–2013)
- Education: North Dakota State University (BS); University of Minnesota, Twin Cities (MS)

Military service
- Allegiance: United States
- Branch/service: United States Navy
- Battles/wars: World War II

William Lewis Guy (September 30, 1919 – April 26, 2013) was an American politician who was the 26th governor of North Dakota from 1961 to 1973. Guy was North Dakota's longest-serving governor in state history, serving two consecutive two-year terms and two four-year terms in office.

== Biography ==
Guy was born in Devils Lake, North Dakota. After receiving his B.S. degree from North Dakota Agricultural College (NDAC), where he was a member of Sigma Alpha Epsilon and Blue Key National Honor Society. He served in the U.S. Navy in World War II as a gunnery officer, achieving the rank of lieutenant. He received a master's degree from the University of Minnesota, and then became the assistant county agent for Cass County. With his wife, Jean Mason, whom he married on January 30, 1943, Guy began farming at Amenia, North Dakota, in 1948 and taught agricultural economics at NDAC during the winter quarters.

He served in the North Dakota House of Representatives for one term from 1959 to 1961. In the legislature, Guy served as assistant minority leader. He died on the morning of April 26, 2013 at West Fargo, North Dakota. He was 93. He had Alzheimer's disease.

== Governor of North Dakota ==
His election as governor on the Democratic-Nonpartisan League ticket finally established the two-party system in North Dakota. As governor, Guy served two two-year terms and two four-year terms. He began modernizing state government by implementing the new Office of Management and Budget. During his terms, the state hospital's patient load was reduced from 2,600 to 600 and eight regional mental health districts were established. Guy organized the five-state Old West Trail Tourist Loop. The interstate highway system, 350 Minuteman missiles, the anti-ballistic missiles site, and Garrison Diversion were large federal projects that came to North Dakota during Guy's watch. He was instrumental in bringing three sugar beet refineries and large scale coal-fired electrical generation to North Dakota. Governor Guy was selected by President Lyndon B. Johnson to observe the first presidential elections in South Vietnam. He originated the concept of an interpretive North Dakota Heritage Center and promoted its construction. The Theodore Roosevelt Rough Rider Award was established by Governor Guy as North Dakota's highest recognition. Guy organized and served as the first chairman of the Midwest Governors' Conference in 1962. In 1966, he was elected chairman of the National Governors' Conference. He was an unsuccessful candidate for the United States Senate in 1974.

== See also ==
- North Dakota United States Senate election, 1974
- Politics of North Dakota

Party political offices
Preceded by John Lord	Democratic nominee for Governor of North Dakota; 1960, 1962, 1964, 1968	Succeeded by Arthur Link
Preceded by Herschel Lashkowitz	Democratic nominee for U.S. Senator from North Dakota (Class 3); 1974	Succeeded by Kent Johanneson
Political offices
Preceded by John Davis	Governor of North Dakota; 1961–1973	Succeeded by Arthur Link
Preceded by John Reed	Chair of the National Governors Association; 1966–1967	Succeeded by John Volpe
