= Gulleson =

Gulleson is a surname. Notable people with the surname include:

- Haaken Gulleson, 16th century Swedish sculptor and painter
- Pam Gulleson (born 1947), American politician
