= Ådalen Line =

Railway line in Sweden

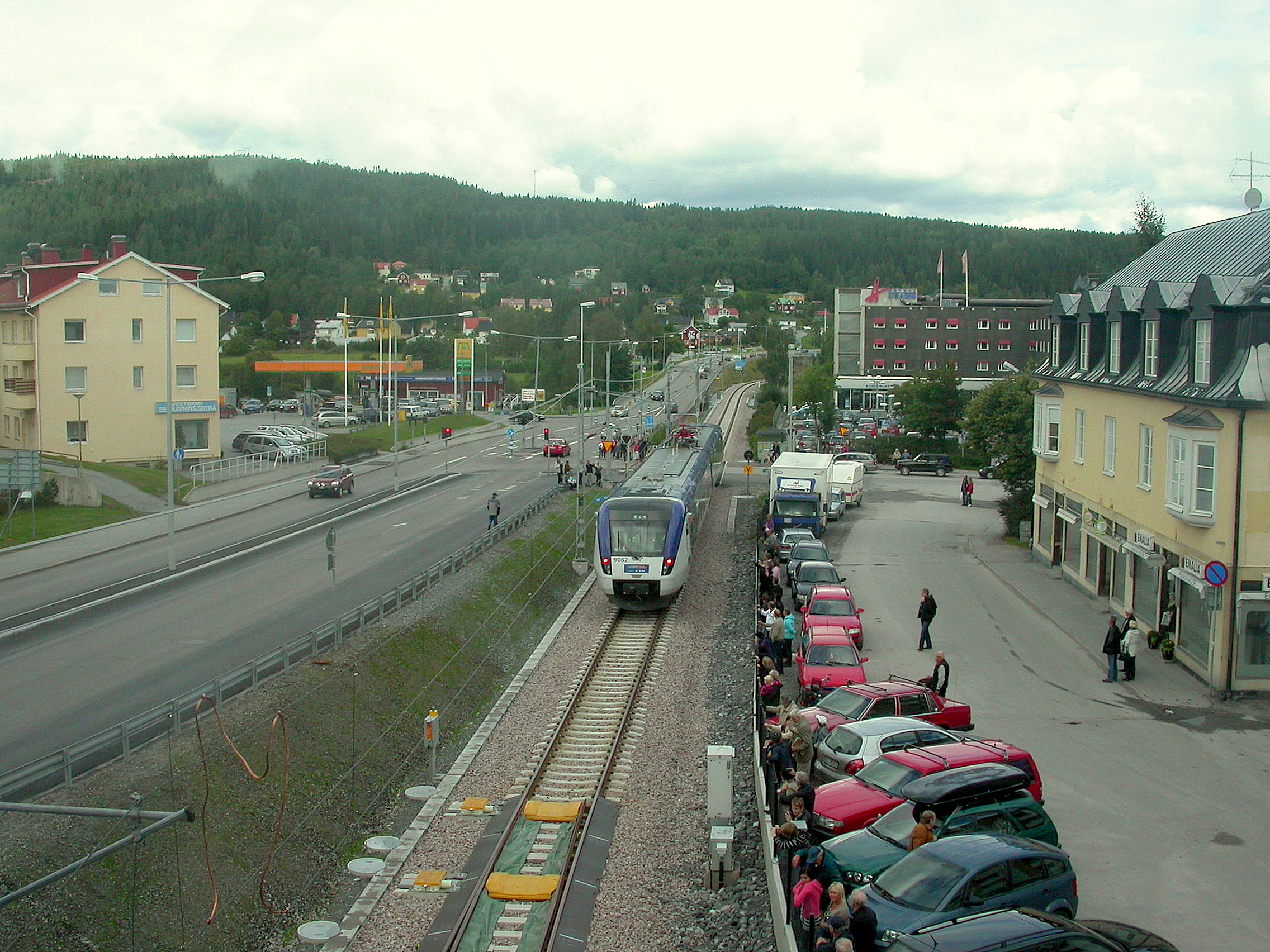
Kramfors

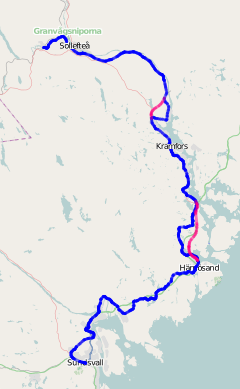
Map of the line, with new sections in red

The Ådalen Line (Swedish: Ådalsbanan) is a 184-kilometre (114 mi) railway line between Sundsvall and Långsele in Sweden. At Sundsvall, the line intersects with the Central Line and the East Coast Line. At Långsele, the line intersects with the Main Line Through Upper Norrland. It also connects to the Bothnia Line.

The Ådalen Line follows, and is named for, the Ådalen river valley.

Railway stations with stops for passenger trains are (as of 2018):

- Västeraspby (Höga Kusten Airport)
- Kramfors
- Härnösand
- Timrå
- Sundsvall Västra (West)
- Sundsvall Central

== History ==
Traditionally the line now known as the Ådalen Line consisting of three sections. The connection from Sollefteå and Långsele was built by the Swedish State Railways and opened in 1886, at the same time as the northern part of the Main Line Through Upper Norrland from Ragunda to Långsele. The private Härnösand–Sollefteå Railway (Härnösand-Sollefteå Järnväg) received a concession for a private railway in 1888, and opened in 1893. The section from Härnösand to Sundsvall was originally built as part of the East Coast Line and opened in 1925, two years before the line was completed to Gävle. The Härnösand–Sollefteå Railway was nationalized in 1932 and electrified in 1958 at 15 kV 16.7 Hz AC.

== Renovation ==
The Swedish Transport Administration upgraded 100 kilometres (62 mi) of the line, and built 30 kilometres (19 mi) of new track, from Sundsvall to the connection with the new high-speed Bothnia Line north of Nyland. The upgrades both include renewal of existing track, and two new section of track. The upgraded line has a maximum permitted axle load of 25 tonnes (25 long tons; 28 short tons), allow 1,400 tonnes (1,400 long tons; 1,500 short tons) trains and have the new European Rail Traffic Management System (ERTMS). Along with the Bothnia Line and the East Coast Line, the Ådalen Line is the new high-speed main line along the East Coast of Sweden, from Stockholm to Umeå.

21 kilometres (13 mi) of new right-of-way was built; 13 kilometres (8.1 mi) between Härnösand and Veda, and 8 kilometres (5.0 mi) between Bollstabruk and the connection to the Bothnia Line. This section has eight new tunnels, totaling 14 kilometres (8.7 mi).

The upgrades were completed in September 2012.
