= Ytterlännäs Old Church =

Historical church in Västernorrland County, Sweden

Coordinates: 63°00′23″N 17°42′27″E

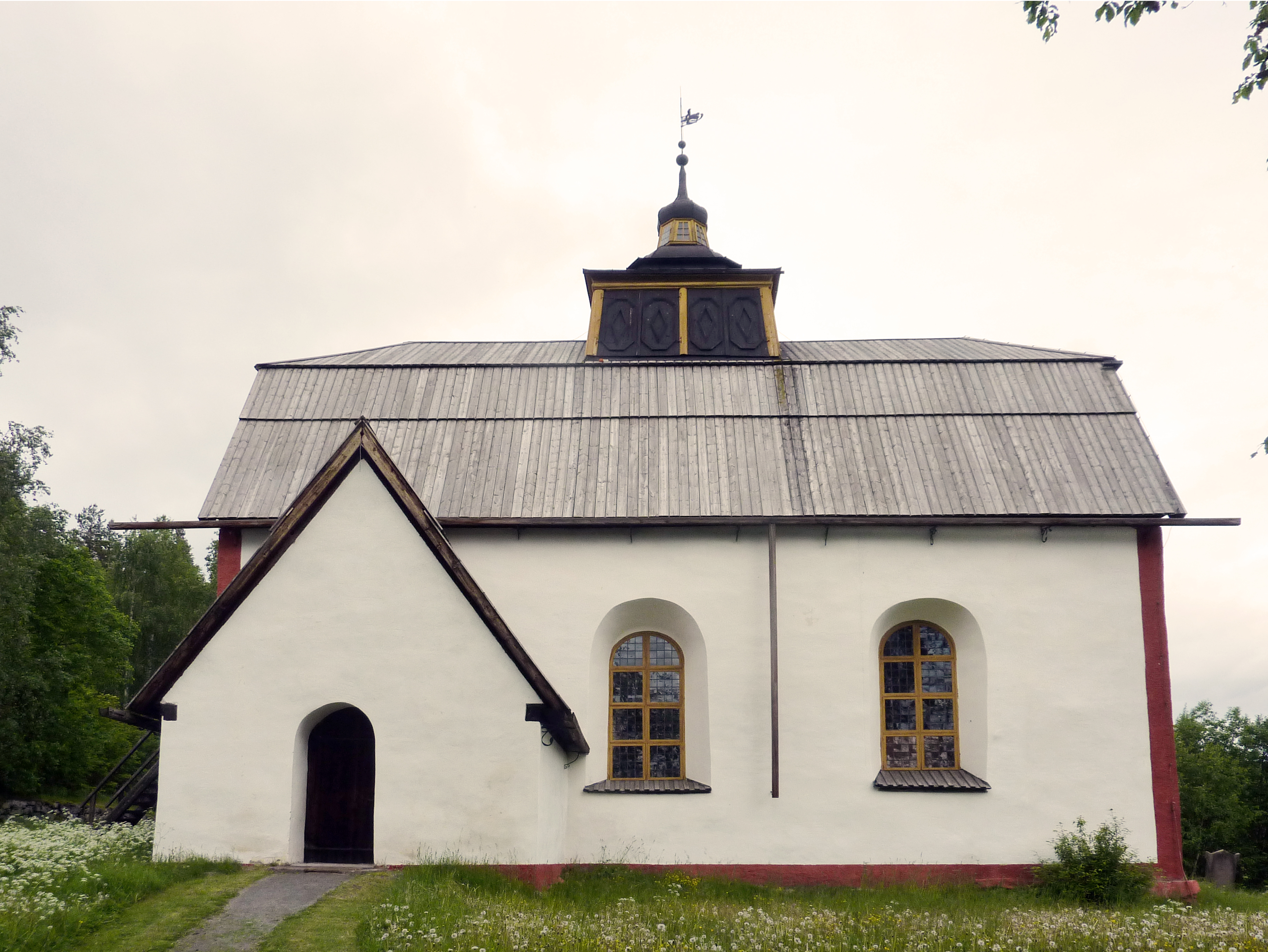
Ytterlännäs Old Church

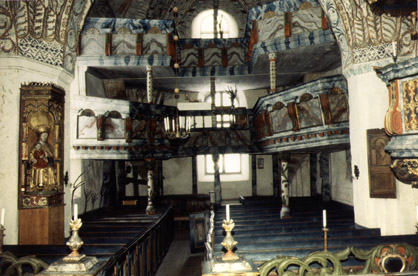
Ytterlännäs Old Church interior

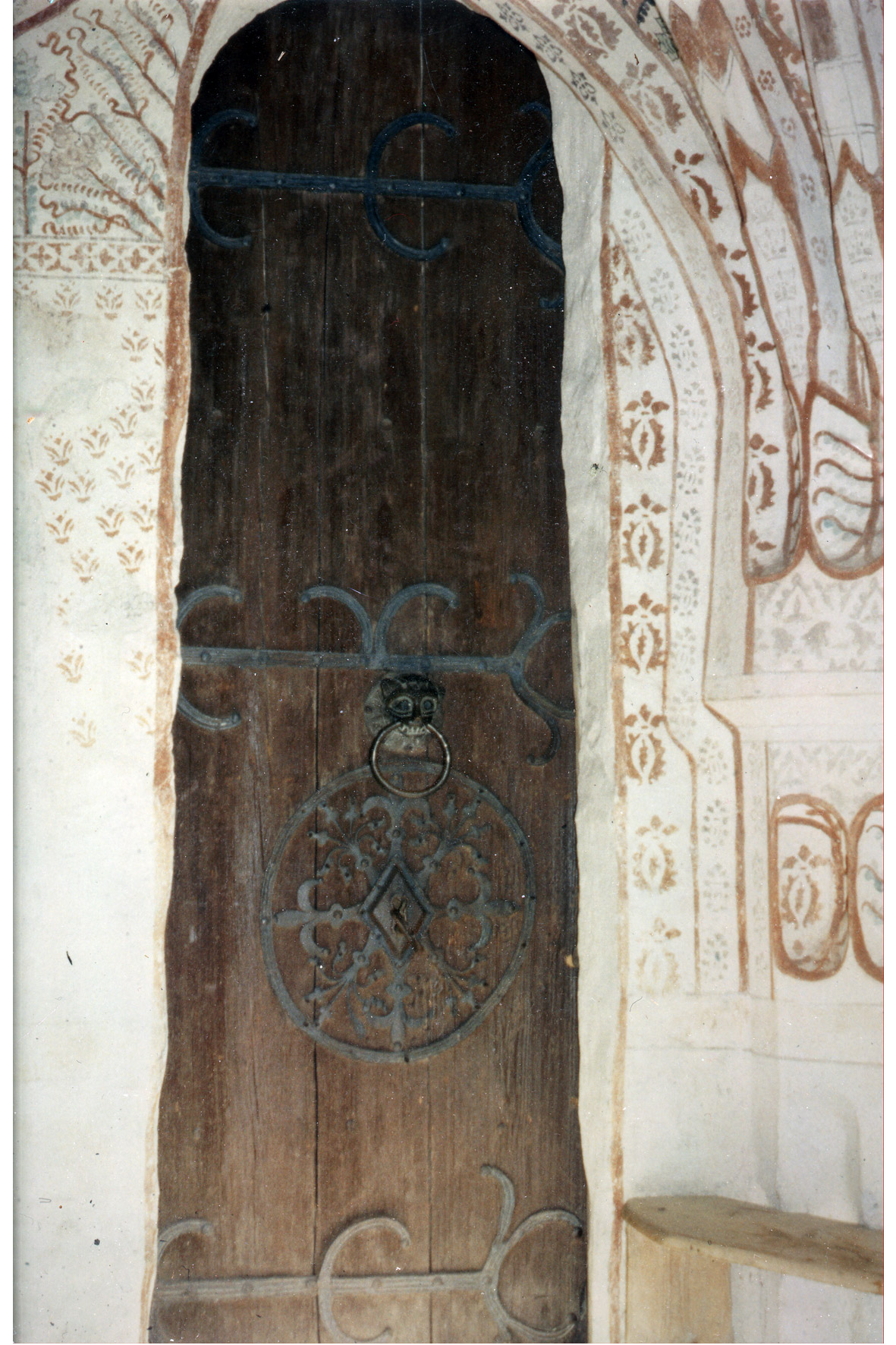
Ytterlännäs Old Church, the original outer door, 1200s.

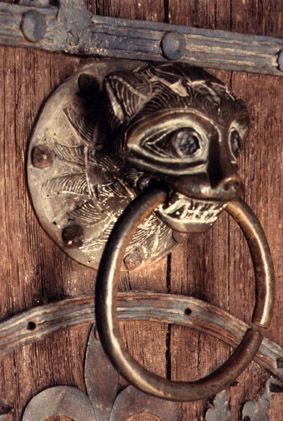
Ytterlännäs Old Church, lion's head, c. 800

Old Church of Ytterlännäs (Ytterlännäs gamla kyrka) is a 13th-century church building in Västernorrland County, Sweden. It is located between Nyland and Bollstabruk on the main road no. 333 in Kramfors Municipality. In terms of ecclesiastical divisions, the Ytterlännäs parish belonged to the Archdiocese of Uppsala in the Middle Ages, but has been part of the Diocese of Härnösand since that was formed in 1647.

== History ==
The building dates from the early 13th century, retaining the original walls and the Romanesque outer door with its iron ornament around the keyhole, and a lion's head from ca. 800 from the area of Byzantine cultural influence around Constantinople. From the 14th century there is a marble baptismal font from Gotland and a crucifix. An altarpiece in the Lübeck style has been displayed in several positions.

In the 15th century a vestry and a 'weapon-house' (porch) were added, the choir was extended to make it as wide as the rest of the church, the roof was raised with vaults of brick, the windows enlarged, the Maria-bell was cast, and there is a candle-holder featuring a cock and a spiral central pillar. In the vaults and on the walls there are well-preserved frescos from the late 15th century, featuring a variety of biblical references and the legends of saints. It also includes an inscription interpreted by the art historian J Henrik Cornell (1890–1981) in Norrlands kyrkliga konst under medeltiden (Uppsala, 1918) as spelling maalede Eghil, "painted by Eghil". This was re-interpreted by Einar Bager (1887–1990) in Kyrkomålarens Eghils sorgliga ändalykt (Ångermanland. 1969) as simply the incipit of the alphabet; the anonymous painter, who belonged to the Tierp school, is now known as the Alphabet Master (Alfabetsmästaren).

The altar cabinet entitled Ytterlännäs Madonna, from the workshop of Haaken Gulleson in Hälsingland, features both the coat of arms of the archdiocese, to which the church belonged at the time, and the personal arms (the claw of an eagle) of Archbishop Jakob Ulfsson. It is presumably a donation made on the occasion of the visit by the Archbishop in 1507.

From the 17th century there are pews, a wooden floor with broad planks and one panel of a pulpit; the first of the gallery's three sections is dated 1652. In the 18th century a rare second gallery was added, as well as a new pulpit and a new altarpiece featuring a sculpture of the Last Supper with 1+13 round the table. Under protest the paintings of saints on the wall, the saints images in the ceilings and the other decoration was not touched. In 1773 the separate bell-tower burned down and was replaced by mounting the bells above the church itself, under a broken roof.

In the mid-19th century a larger church was needed to house the growing population, and it was decided to re-use the stones from the old church to build a new: but in an impassioned and rhetorical speech, magistrate Carl Martin Schönmeyer, owner of the estate Angsta gård, managed to turn the decision in favour of leaving the old church untouched. It was abandoned and the Maria-bell was used at the smaller of two bells in the new church. Ytterlännäs New Church (Ytterlännäs nya kyrka) was opened in 1854 with Israel Israelsson Näslund (1796–1858) as the vicar.

In 1937, art historian and newspaper editor Gustaf Näsström (1899–1979) made a plea for donations towards a restoration of the church, after which the whitewash was carefully removed a far as was possible; in 1950, to mark the 100th anniversary of the decision not to demolish the old church, the Maria-bell was returned from the new church.

In 1963, architect Lars Holmer carried out detailed measurements and drew elevations from east, west and south, a plan, and sections along the breadth and length. In 1964, brother Gösta and Torsten Melin made a documentary film, which was certified by art historian J Henrik Cornell, as 'the first colour film made in Sweden about a medieval era church'; in 1978 they also filmed the extensive renovation which was carried out then; both films are now available on DVD.

In 1995 the Old Church became a 'roadside church' and today it is open seven days a week for seven weeks after mid-summer, with guiding, a coffee house, a medieval workshop, music and other activities.

== Gallery ==
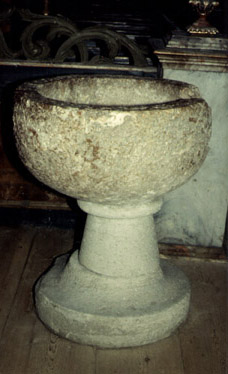
Baptismal font, 14th century

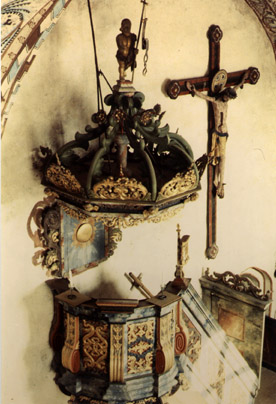
Crucifix, 14th century

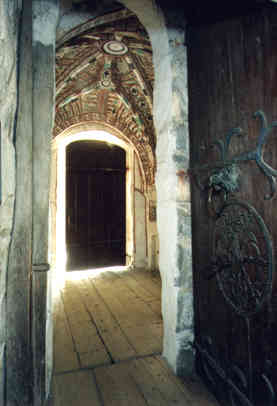
Porch, 15th century

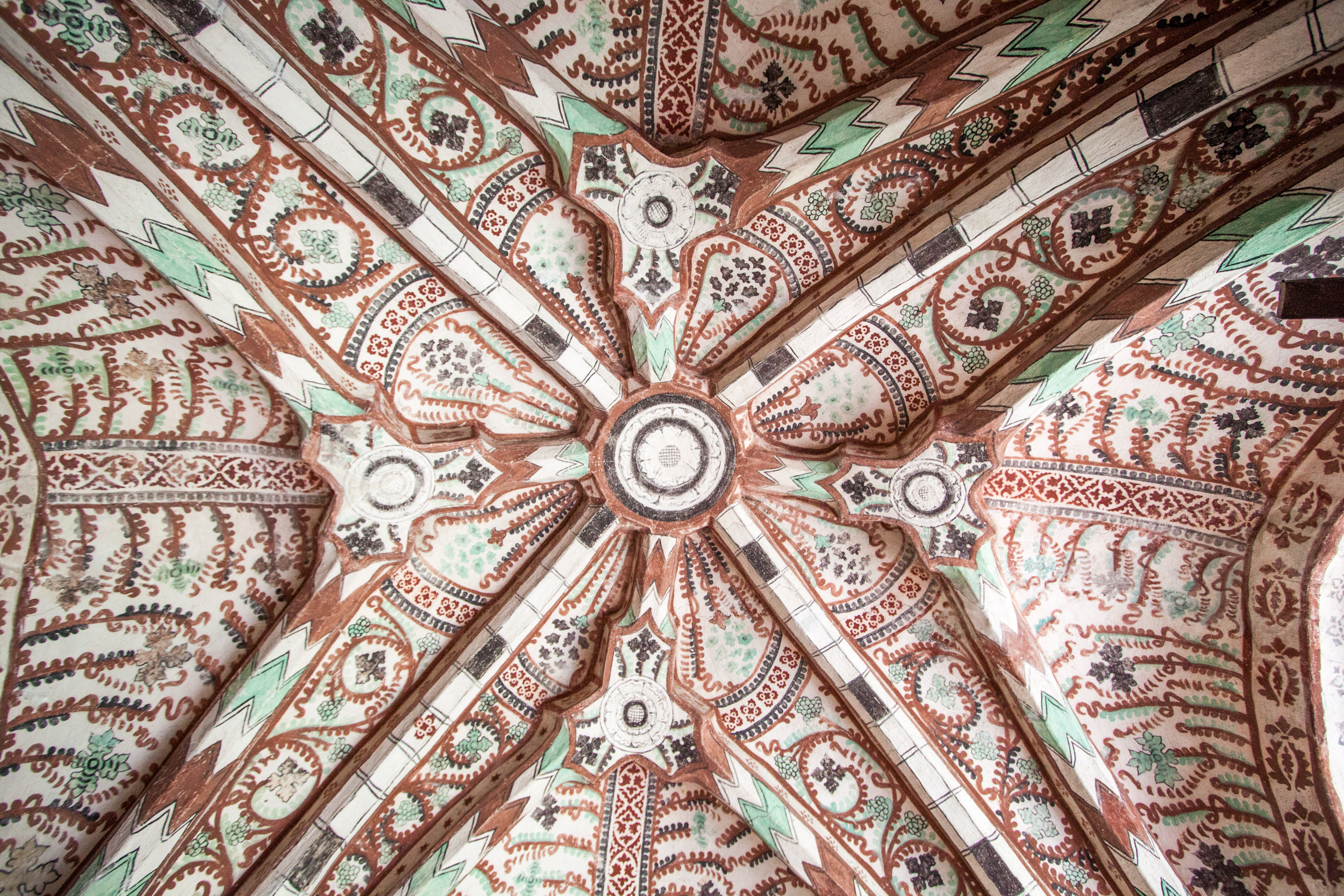
Vaults, 15th century

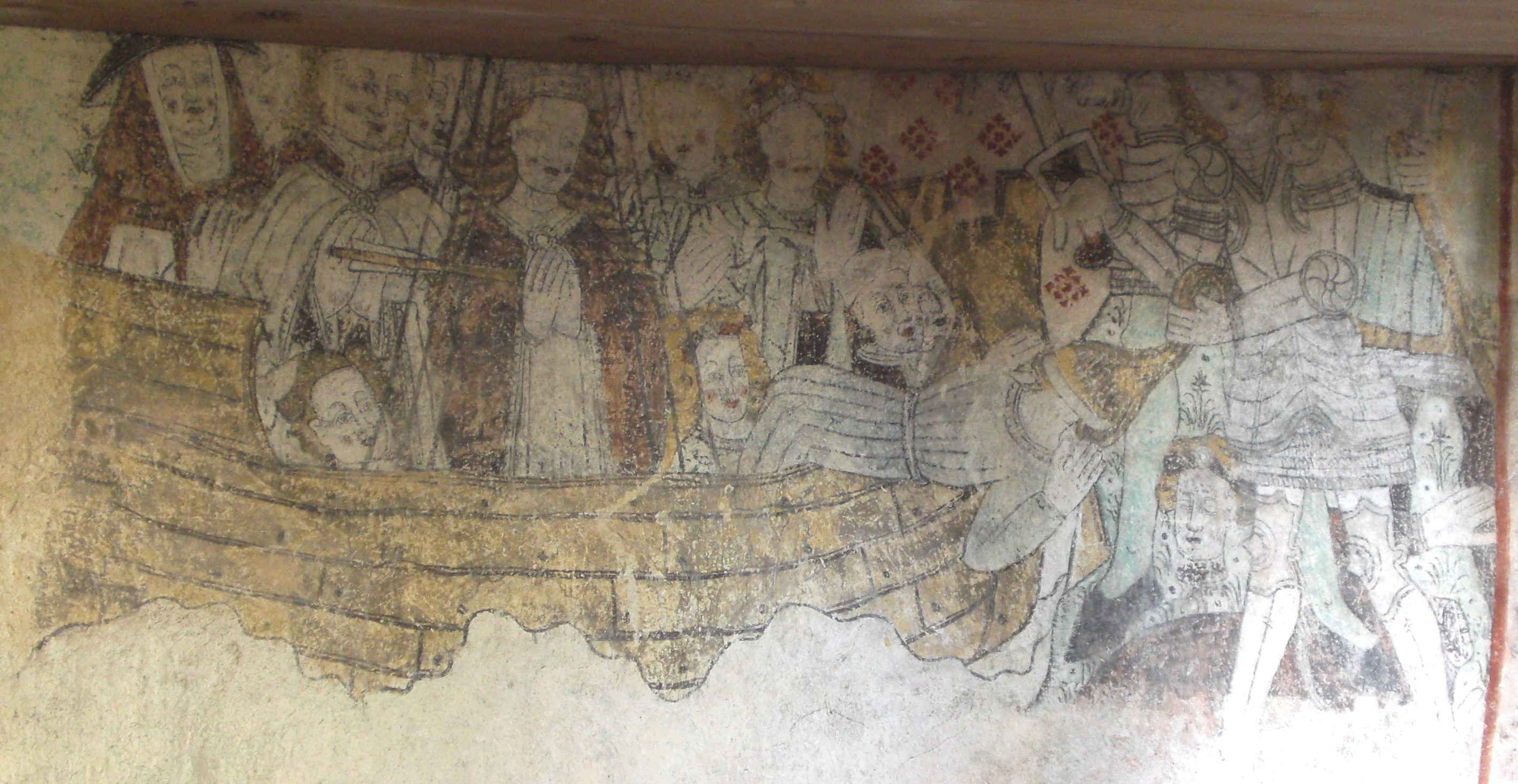
Fresco, St. Ursula, 15th century

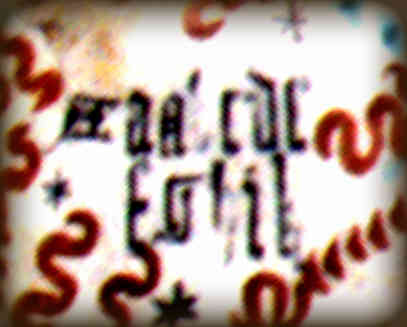
Alphabet inscription, 15th century

Maria-bell, 15th century

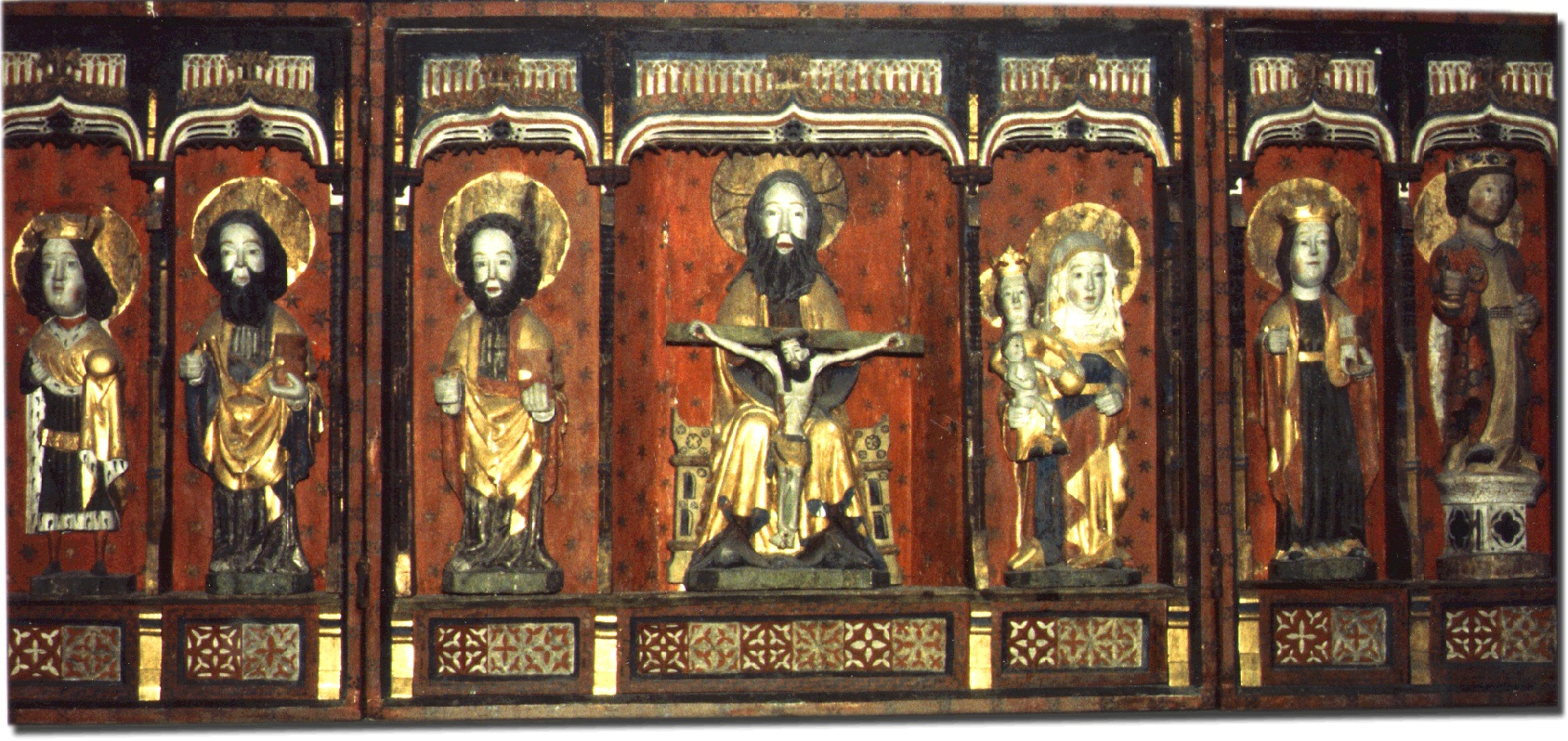
Altarpiece, 15th century

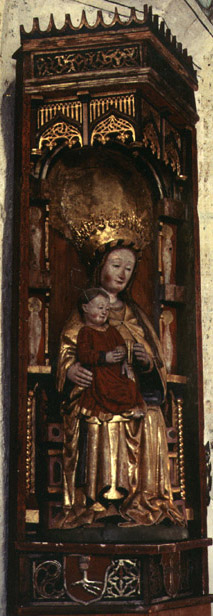
Haaken Gulleson Ytterlännäs Madonna c. 1507

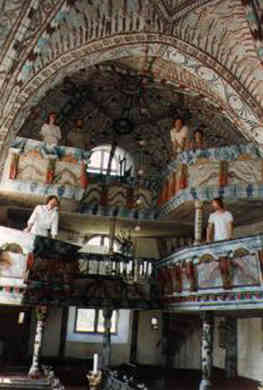
Galleries, 17th and 18th century

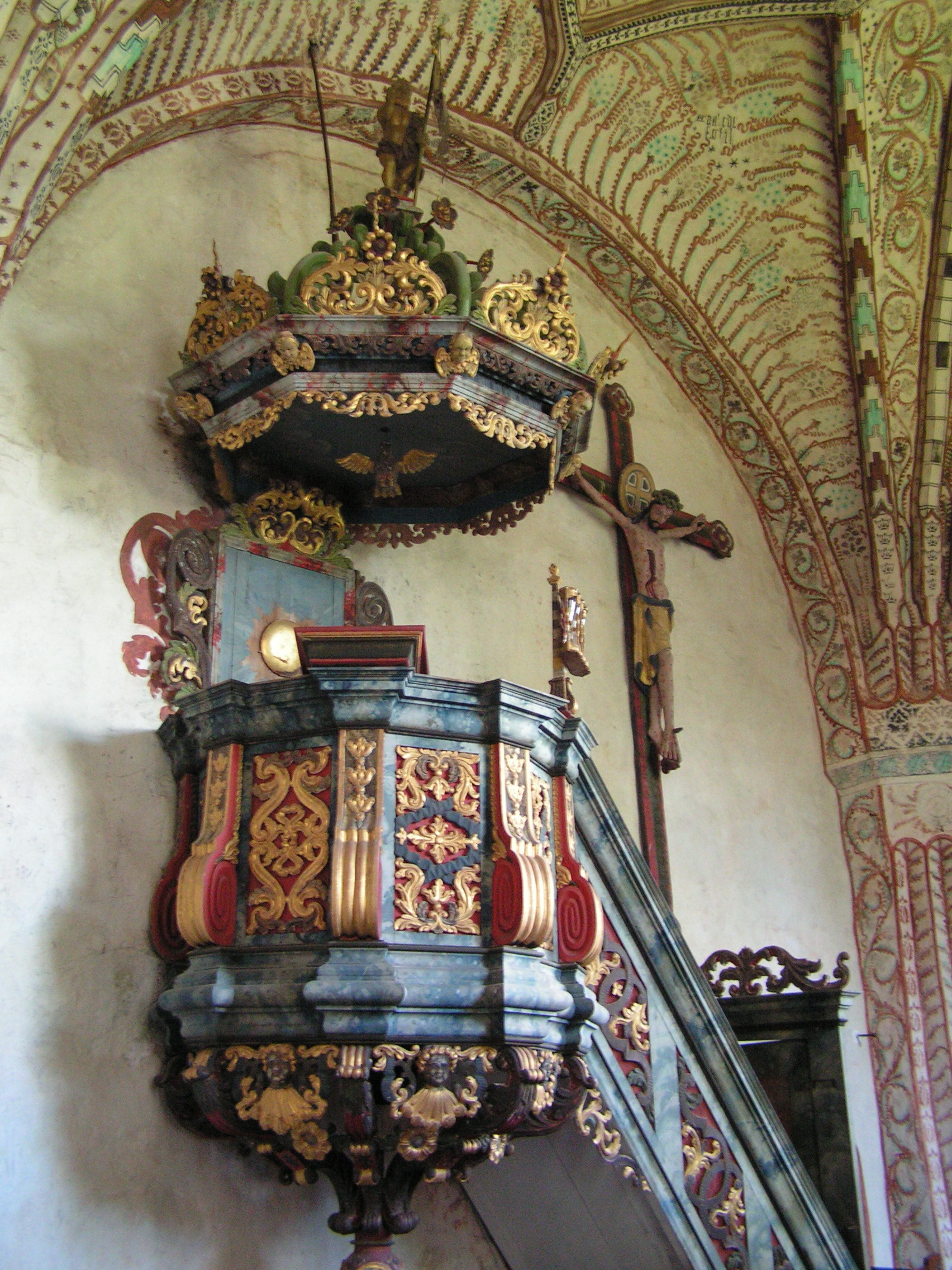
Pulpit, 18th century

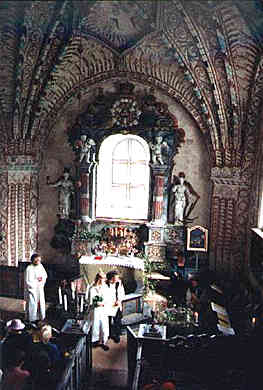
Altarpiece, 18th century

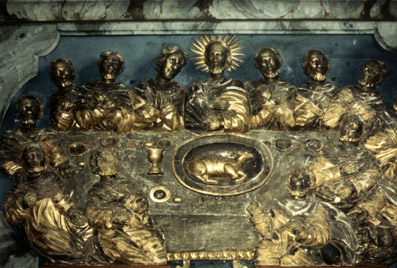
Sculpture of the Last Supper with 13 disciples, 18th century

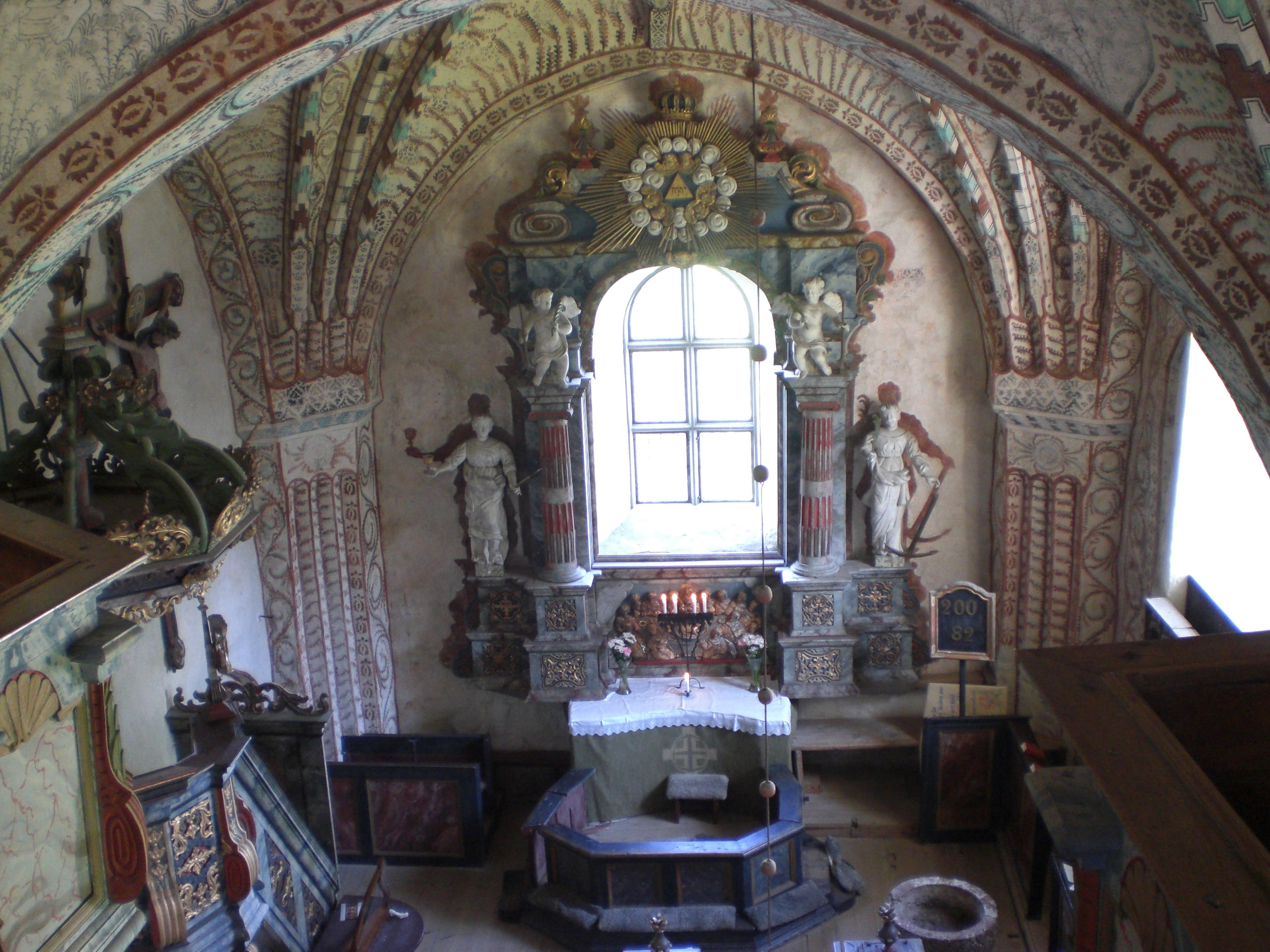
Altar, 15th century

== See also ==
- Ytterlännäs parish
- Ytterlännäs new church

== Other sources ==
- Nordisk familjebok, 3:e upplagan, band 20, 1934
- Cornell H., Wallin S. ; Uppsvenska målarskolor på 1400-talet, 1933
