= Ytterlännäs parish =

Swedish parish

Coordinates: 63°00′22″N 17°41′05″E

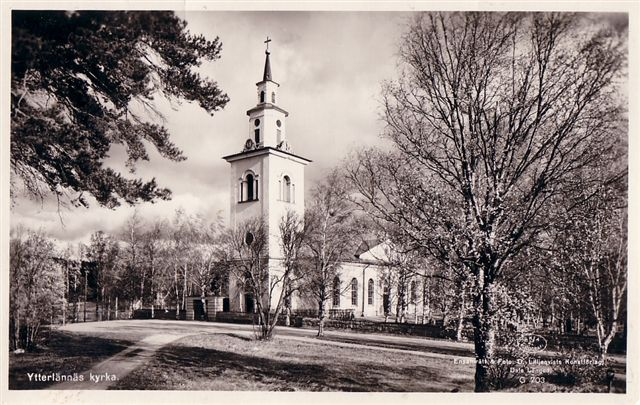
Ytterlännäs New Church

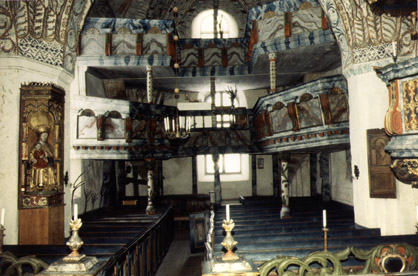
Ytterlännäs Old Church

Ytterlännäs Parish (Swedish: Ytterlännäs församling) is a parish in the Diocese of Härnösand in Västernorrland County, Sweden. Ytterlännäs parish contains Sweden's oldest continuous choir.

== History ==
Ytterlännäs parish, in the province of Ångermanland, belonged to the Archdiocese of Uppsala in the Middle Ages, but has been part of the Diocese of Härnösand since the diocese's formation in 1647. The two churches of the parish, the old one from the early 13th century, and the new one, built from 1848 to 1854, are located between the communities of Nyland and Bollstabruk, within Kramfors Municipality.

The Ytterlännäs Old Church dates from the 13th century and features medieval vaults, wall-paintings and wooden sculptures. It has baroque furnishings that include two galleries. The Ytterlännäs Madonna is an example of the work from the Hälsingland workshop of Haaken Gulleson. The church is in an excellent state of preservation from being unused since 1854.

The Ytterlännäs New Church was completed in 1854 and is an example of the Tegnér barn style.

== Assistant vicars ==
"Komministrar i Ytterlännäs"

#	30em	Term	Notes
1	Herr Lars I	1542 to 1557	
2	Herr Nils	1582	
3	Olaus Nicolai	1593 to 1596	
4	Johannes Claudii	1599	
5	Sanderus Erici	1599 to 1607	
6	Herr Lars II	1613 to 1633	
7	Nils Persson	1636 to 1637	
8	Olaus Erici Rufinius	1637 to 1672	
9	Laurentius Christophori Hornæus (1645–1719)	1672 to 1719	In 1675 he was responsible for the Torsåker witch trials which was the largest witch-hunt in Sweden's history.
10	Lars Larsson Hornæus	1719 to 1751	
11	Jöns Hornæus	1773 to 1778	
12	Petrus Jonæ Öman (1719–1796)	1780 to 1796	
13	Israel Edenmark	1796 to 1812	
14	Daniel Orstadius	1812 to 1820	
15	Per Nordenmark	1820 to 1833	
16	Olof Grafström	1833 to 1835	
17	Nils Erik Höglund (1781–1838)	1836 to 1838	
18	Israel Israelsson Näslund III (1796–1858)	1841 to 1858	
19	Carl Gustaf Isak Jonas Oscar Stjernberg (1812–1901)	1862 to 1901	

== Music directors ==
"Kyrkomusiker i Ytterlännäs"

#	Image	Cantor	Term	Notes
1		Anton Julius Winblad (1828–1901)	1851 to 1866	
2		Erik Olof Boding	1866 to 1875	
3		Per Olof Bernhard Wahlberg (1852–1927)	1876 to 1912	He was born in Grfbyn in Loos parish (now Hälsingland) on May 17, 1852.
4		Nikolaus Bölin	1913 to 1947	
5		Thorvald Johannesson	1948 to 1978	
6		Ulla-Marie Nilsson	1979 to 2016	
