= Simon McDonald =

Simon McDonald may refer to:

- Simon S. McDonald (1869–1956), North Dakota Republican Party politician
- Simon McDonald, Baron McDonald of Salford (b. 1961), former UK diplomat
