= List of North Dakota public service commissioners =

Number of North Dakota public service commissioners by party affiliation
Party	Commissioners
Democratic-NPL	1
Republican	20

The following is a list of current and past North Dakota public service commissioners. The North Dakota Public Service Commission was created in 1940 to replace the previous North Dakota Board of Railroad Commissioners. The three at-large commissioner positions and staggered 6-year terms were carried over from its predecessor, the new commission taking effect as of January 1. 1941. The constitutional amendment that created the Public Service Commission stipulated that two positions be opened for election, one shortened 4-year term and one full six-year term. At that time, the commissioners in the three seats were: Elmer Cart (elected 1934 but defeated in the 1940 primary), Ben Larkin (elected 1938), and Simon S. McDonald (elected 1936).

== First commissioner ==
#	Name	Term	Party
1	Ben C. Larkin	1941–1949	Republican
2	Ernest D. Nelson	1949–1961	Republican
3	Bruce Hagen	1961–2000	Democratic-NPL
4	Tony Clark	2001-2012	Republican
5	Bonny Fetch	2012–2013	Republican
6	Randy Christmann	2013–	Republican

== Second commissioner ==
#	Name	Term	Party
1	Clark W. McDonnell	1941–1950	Republican
2	Everett H. Brant	1951–1954	Republican
3	Martin Vaaler	1954–1962	Republican
4	Ben J. Wolf	1963–1980	Republican
5	Leo M. Reinbold	1981–2003	Republican
6	Kevin Cramer	2003–2012	Republican
7	Julie Fedorchak	2013–2025	Republican
8	Jill Kringstad	2025–	Republican

== Third commissioner ==
#	Name	Term	Party
1	Simon S. McDonald	1941–1948	Republican
2	Elmer W. Cart	1949–1954	Republican
3	Anson J. Anderson	1955–1960	Republican
4	Richard J. Thompson	1961–1966	Republican
5	Richard A. Elkin	1967–1983	Republican
6	Dale V. Sandstrom	1983–1992	Republican
7	Susan Wefald	1993–2009	Republican
8	Brian Kalk	2009–2017	Republican
9	Brian Kroshus	2017–2022	Republican
10	Sheri Haugen-Hoffart	2022-	Republican

== See also ==
- North Dakota Public Service Commission
