= Clark W. McDonnell =

American politician (1870–1952)

- Clark W. McDonnell

North Dakota Public Service Commissioner
- In office January 1, 1941 – December 31, 1950
- Preceded by: Ben C. Larkin
- Succeeded by: Everett H. Brant

Personal details
- Born: May 19, 1870 Nova Scotia, Canada
- Died: May 15, 1952 (aged 81) Bismarck, North Dakota
- Party: Republican

Clark W. McDonnell (May 19, 1870 – May 15, 1952) was a North Dakota Republican Party politician who served as a North Dakota Public Service Commissioner from 1941 to 1950. Prior to 1941, his title was North Dakota Railroad Commissioner. He had served in that position from 1920 to 1936.

== Biography ==
Clark McDonnell was born in Nova Scotia, Canada, in 1870. He came to Minnesota in 1883, and began working for the Soo Line Railroad in 1892 as a telegraph operator in Paynesville, Minnesota. He came to Kensal, North Dakota, as an agent for the Soo Line in March 1893 and stayed in that position until 1905. He left the railroad industry that year and operated a dray and ice business in Kensal for the next five years. He operated a farm in Foster County from 1909 to 1923 and served in the North Dakota House of Representatives from 1917 to 1920 in the 32nd district. He was elected to the North Dakota Board of Railroad Commissioners in 1920, but after serving five terms, he left the commission in 1936. When the North Dakota Board of Railroad Commissioners was restructured into the North Dakota Public Service Commission in 1940, two seats were opened as part of the reorganization, one shortened 4-year term and one full 6-year term. One seat was open due to Elmer Cart losing his primary election, and McDonnell chose to run again, winning the 4-year term, then was reelected to a full 6-year term in 1944. McDonnell won the Republican primary in 1950, but withdrew his name from the ballot in September and retired at the age of 80. He died in Bismarck two years later, shortly before his 82nd birthday.

== Notes ==
Preceded by Ben C. Larkin	North Dakota Public Service Commissioner; 1941–1950	Succeeded by Everett H. Brant
