= Bollsta IK =

Sports club in Bollstabruk, Sweden

- Full name: Bollsta idrottsklubb
- Sport: soccer, skiing
- Founded: 1912
- Based in: Bollstabruk, Sweden

Bollsta IK is a sports club in Bollstabruk, Sweden, established in 1912.

The women's soccer team played in the Swedish top division in 1978 and 1979.
