= Bruce Hagen =

American politician (1930–2025)

Bruce Hagen (June 21, 1930 – June 19, 2025) was an American politician who served as North Dakota Public Service Commissioner from 1961 to 2000. He was known as the only member of the Democratic Party to ever serve on the North Dakota Public Service Commission (or its predecessor, the North Dakota Board of Railroad Commissioners), as well as the longest-serving commissioner in either body.

Hagen died on June 19, 2025, two days before his 95th birthday.

== Notes ==
Political offices
Preceded by Ernest D. Nelson	North Dakota Public Service Commissioner; 1961–2000	Succeeded by Tony Clark
