= Tony Clark (politician) =

North Dakota Republican politician

North Dakota Public Service Commissioner
- In office January 1, 2001 – January 23, 2012
- Preceded by: Bruce Hagen
- Succeeded by: Bonny Fetch

Personal details
- Born: December 31, 1971 (age 54) Platteville, Wisconsin
- Party: Republican

Tony Clark (born December 31, 1971) is a North Dakota Republican politician who served as a Public Service Commissioner from 2001 until 2012 when he was appointed to the Federal Energy Regulatory Commission.

== Biography ==
He is a graduate of Fargo North High School, and an alumnus of both NDSU and UND. He was elected to the Public Service Commission of the U.S. state of North Dakota in 2000, and was re-elected in 2006. Prior to being elected Public Service Commissioner, Clark served in the cabinet of Governor Ed Schafer as North Dakota Labor Commissioner, and was the Administrative Officer for the state Tax Department. He is a former state legislator, representing Fargo's District 44 in the state House of Representatives from 1994 to 1997. Clark is married to Amy, and has three children. On Jan. 23, 2012, President Barack Obama nominated Clark to a vacant seat on the five-member Federal Energy Regulatory Commission in Washington. He would fill a Republican seat available following the resignation of Mark Spitzer of Arizona. Under federal law, FERC is made up of three members of the president' s political party and two of the opposition party, with the chairman appointed by the president.

== Notes ==
Political offices
Preceded by Craig Hagen	North Dakota Commissioner of Labor; 1999–2000	Succeeded by Mark D. Bachmeier
Preceded by Bruce Hagen	North Dakota Public Service Commissioner; 2001–2012	Succeeded by Bonny Fetch
