= 2024 United States Senate election in North Dakota =

- November 5, 2024
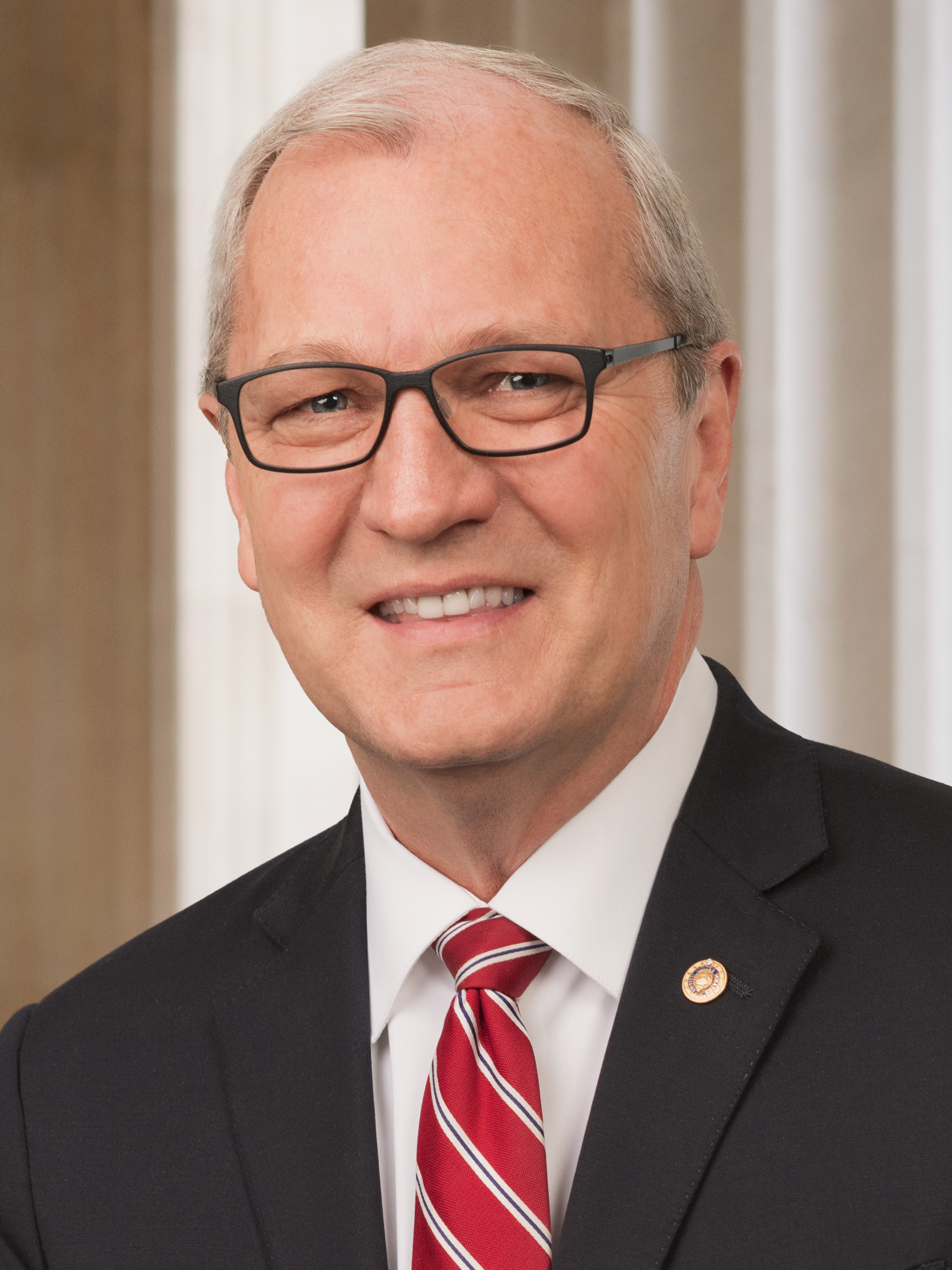

Nominee	Kevin Cramer	Katrina Christiansen
Party	Republican	Democratic–NPL
Popular vote	241,569	121,602
Percentage	66.31%	33.38%
- Cramer: 50–60% 60–70% 70–80% 80–90% >90% Christiansen: 50–60% 60–70% 70–80% 80–90% Tie: 50% No votes
U.S. senator before election
Kevin Cramer
Republican
Elected U.S. Senator
Kevin Cramer
Republican

The 2024 United States Senate election in North Dakota was held on November 5, 2024, to elect a member of the United States Senate to represent the state of North Dakota. Republican incumbent Kevin Cramer was re-elected to a second term in office, defeating Democratic–NPL educator Katrina Christiansen in the general election with more than 66% of the vote. Primary elections took place on June 11, 2024, with Cramer and Christiansen winning their respective party's nomination unopposed.

This marked the first time since 1958 that a Republican incumbent won re-election in this class 1 seat. Cramer more than tripled his margin from 2018 and won 10 counties he lost in 2018.

== Republican primary ==
=== Candidates ===
==== Nominee ====
- Kevin Cramer, incumbent U.S. senator (2019–present)

=== Endorsements ===
Kevin Cramer

Executive Branch officials

- Donald Trump, 45th President of the United States (2017–2021)

Organizations

- American Israel Public Affairs Committee (AIPAC)
- ClearPath Action Fund
- International Franchise Association
- North Dakota Republican Party

=== Fundraising ===
Campaign finance reports as of June 30, 2024
Candidate	Raised	Spent	Cash on hand
Kevin Cramer (R)	$5,423,493	$2,328,177	$3,290,838
Source: Federal Election Commission

=== Results ===
Republican primary results
Party	Candidate	Votes	%
Republican	Kevin Cramer (incumbent)	82,692	100.00%
Total votes		82,692	100.00%

== Democratic-NPL primary ==
=== Candidates ===
==== Nominee ====
- Katrina Christiansen, University of Jamestown engineering professor and nominee for North Dakota’s other U.S. Senate seat in 2022

=== Endorsements ===
Katrina Christiansen

Statewide officials

- Roger Johnson, former North Dakota Agriculture Commissioner (1996–2009)
- Sarah Vogel, former North Dakota Agriculture Commissioner (1989–1997)

Organizations

- National Organization for Women PAC
- National Women's Political Caucus
- North Dakota Democratic-Nonpartisan League Party
- Vote Common Good

=== Fundraising ===
Campaign finance reports as of June 30, 2024
Candidate	Raised	Spent	Cash on hand
Katrina Christiansen (D-NPL)	$1,154,175	$957,217	$200,218
Source: Federal Election Commission

=== Results ===
Democratic–NPL primary results
Party	Candidate	Votes	%
Democratic–NPL	Katrina Christiansen	19,690	100.00%
Total votes		19,690	100.00%

== Independents ==
=== Filed paperwork ===
- Kristin Hedger, manufacturing executive and Democratic nominee for North Dakota Secretary of State in 2006

== General election ==
=== Predictions ===
Source	Ranking	As of
The Cook Political Report	Solid R	November 9, 2023
Inside Elections	Solid R	November 9, 2023
Sabato's Crystal Ball	Safe R	November 9, 2023
Decision Desk HQ/The Hill	Safe R	June 8, 2024
Elections Daily	Safe R	May 4, 2023
CNalysis	Solid R	November 21, 2023
RealClearPolitics	Solid R	August 5, 2024
Split Ticket	Safe R	October 23, 2024
538	Solid R	October 23, 2024

=== Polling ===
Poll source	Date(s) administered	Sample size (Note: Key: A – all adults RV – registered voters LV – likely voters V – unclear)	Margin of error	Kevin Cramer (R)	Katrina Christiansen (D)	Other	Undecided
WPA Intelligence (Note: Poll sponsored by North Dakota News Cooperative)	September 28–30, 2024	500 (LV)	± 4.4%	51%	29%	–	20%
Lake Research Partners (D) (Note: Poll sponsored by Christiansen's campaign)	September 23–26, 2024	500 (LV)	± 4.4%	49%	40%	2% (Note: "Other" and "Refused" with 1%)	9%
WPA Intelligence (R) (Note: Poll sponsored by Cramer's campaign)	September 22–24, 2024	521 (LV)	± 4.4%	60%	31%	–	9%
Lake Research Partners (D)	June 28 – August 2, 2024	500 (LV)	± 4.4%	51%	38%	–	11%
Public Opinion Strategies (Note: Poll sponsored by Brighter Future Alliance)	June 15–19, 2024	500 (LV)	± 4.4%	65%	28%	–	6%
Emerson College	October 1–4, 2023	419 (RV)	± 4.8%	45%	19%	9%	28%

=== Results ===
2024 United States Senate election in North Dakota
Party	Candidate	Votes	%	±%
Republican	Kevin Cramer (incumbent)	241,569	66.31%	+11.20%
Democratic–NPL	Katrina Christiansen	121,602	33.38%	−10.89%
Write-in		1,156	0.32%	-0.31%
Total votes		364,327	100.00%	N/A
Republican hold				

==== By county ====
County	Kevin Cramer Republican		Katrina Christiansen Democratic–NPL		Write-in Various		Margin		Total votes
County	#	%	#	%	#	%	#	%	Total votes
Adams	933	77.94%	259	21.64%	5	0.42%	674	56.31%	1,197
Barnes	3,403	63.97%	1,901	35.73%	16	0.30%	1,502	28.23%	5,320
Benson	1,071	55.01%	873	44.84%	3	0.15%	198	10.17%	1,947
Billings	529	81.38%	117	18.00%	4	0.62%	412	63.38%	650
Bottineau	2,511	73.44%	895	26.18%	13	0.38%	1,616	47.27%	3,419
Bowman	1,349	83.53%	263	16.28%	3	0.19%	1,086	67.24%	1,615
Burke	868	82.59%	175	16.65%	8	0.76%	693	65.94%	1,051
Burleigh	35,755	69.15%	15,714	30.39%	240	0.46%	20,041	38.76%	51,709
Cass	48,637	53.95%	41,321	45.83%	199	0.22%	7,316	8.11%	90,157
Cavalier	1,421	71.44%	562	28.26%	6	0.30%	859	43.19%	1,989
Dickey	1,722	70.86%	706	29.05%	2	0.08%	1,016	41.81%	2,430
Divide	887	73.92%	309	25.75%	4	0.33%	578	48.17%	1,200
Dunn	1,805	81.75%	395	17.89%	8	0.36%	1,410	63.86%	2,208
Eddy	832	68.42%	380	31.25%	4	0.33%	452	37.17%	1,216
Emmons	1,534	80.69%	355	18.67%	12	0.63%	1,179	62.02%	1,901
Foster	1,279	75.68%	408	24.14%	3	0.18%	871	51.54%	1,690
Golden Valley	822	83.88%	156	15.92%	2	0.20%	666	67.96%	980
Grand Forks	18,509	59.71%	12,418	40.06%	71	0.23%	6,091	19.65%	30,998
Grant	1,035	79.31%	267	20.46%	3	0.23%	768	58.85%	1,305
Griggs	936	72.73%	347	26.96%	4	0.31%	589	45.77%	1,287
Hettinger	1,057	82.32%	225	17.52%	2	0.16%	832	64.80%	1,284
Kidder	1,056	76.86%	316	23.00%	2	0.15%	740	53.86%	1,374
LaMoure	1,536	72.35%	581	27.37%	6	0.28%	955	44.98%	2,123
Logan	833	81.35%	185	18.07%	6	0.59%	648	63.28%	1,024
McHenry	2,068	75.83%	649	23.80%	10	0.37%	1,419	52.04%	2,727
McIntosh	1,060	76.26%	324	23.31%	6	0.43%	736	52.95%	1,390
McKenzie	4,523	83.07%	900	16.53%	22	0.40%	3,623	66.54%	5,445
McLean	3,981	74.11%	1,370	25.50%	21	0.39%	2,611	48.60%	5,372
Mercer	3,414	76.63%	1,010	22.67%	31	0.70%	2,404	53.96%	4,455
Morton	12,263	73.13%	4,431	26.42%	75	0.45%	7,832	46.71%	16,769
Mountrail	2,824	69.87%	1,208	29.89%	10	0.25%	1,616	39.98%	4,042
Nelson	1,091	62.31%	657	37.52%	3	0.17%	434	24.79%	1,751
Oliver	846	79.14%	217	20.30%	6	0.56%	629	58.84%	1,069
Pembina	2,264	72.87%	840	27.04%	3	0.10%	1,424	45.83%	3,107
Pierce	1,445	73.42%	515	26.17%	8	0.41%	930	47.26%	1,968
Ramsey	3,568	68.42%	1,640	31.45%	7	0.13%	1,928	36.97%	5,215
Ransom	1,596	60.62%	1,033	39.23%	4	0.15%	563	21.38%	2,633
Renville	970	80.50%	234	19.42%	1	0.08%	736	61.08%	1,205
Richland	5,321	64.83%	2,877	35.05%	10	0.12%	2,444	29.78%	8,208
Rolette	1,486	36.93%	2,534	62.97%	4	0.10%	-1,048	-26.04%	4,024
Sargent	1,235	60.75%	797	39.20%	1	0.05%	438	21.54%	2,033
Sheridan	581	77.57%	162	21.63%	6	0.80%	419	55.94%	749
Sioux	281	29.64%	665	70.15%	2	0.21%	-384	-40.51%	948
Slope	335	86.12%	52	13.37%	2	0.51%	283	72.75%	389
Stark	12,074	81.34%	2,716	18.30%	53	0.36%	9,358	63.05%	14,843
Steele	585	57.86%	422	41.74%	4	0.40%	163	16.12%	1,011
Stutsman	6,771	68.00%	3,171	31.84%	16	0.16%	3,600	36.15%	9,958
Towner	757	67.95%	355	31.87%	2	0.18%	402	36.09%	1,114
Traill	2,612	63.49%	1,489	36.19%	13	0.32%	1,123	27.30%	4,114
Walsh	3,124	69.53%	1,355	30.16%	14	0.31%	1,769	39.37%	4,493
Ward	20,328	72.05%	7,772	27.55%	113	0.40%	12,556	44.50%	28,213
Wells	1,690	75.45%	537	23.97%	13	0.58%	1,153	51.47%	2,240
Williams	12,156	82.31%	2,542	17.21%	70	0.47%	9,614	65.10%	14,768
Totals	241,569	66.31%	121,602	33.38%	1,156	0.32%	119,967	32.93%	364,327

Counties that flipped from Democratic to Republican

- Cass (largest city: Fargo)
- Barnes (largest city: Valley City)
- Grand Forks (largest city: Grand Forks)
- Nelson (largest city: Lakota)
- Richland (largest city: Wahpeton)
- Traill (largest city: Mayville)
- Benson (largest CDP: Fort Totten)
- Ransom (largest city: Lisbon)
- Sargent (largest city: Gwinner)
- Steele (largest city: Finley)

== Notes ==
Partisan clients
