= Ytterlännäs new church =

Church in Ytterlännäs, Sweden

Coordinates: 63°0′25.7″N 17°41′9.5″E

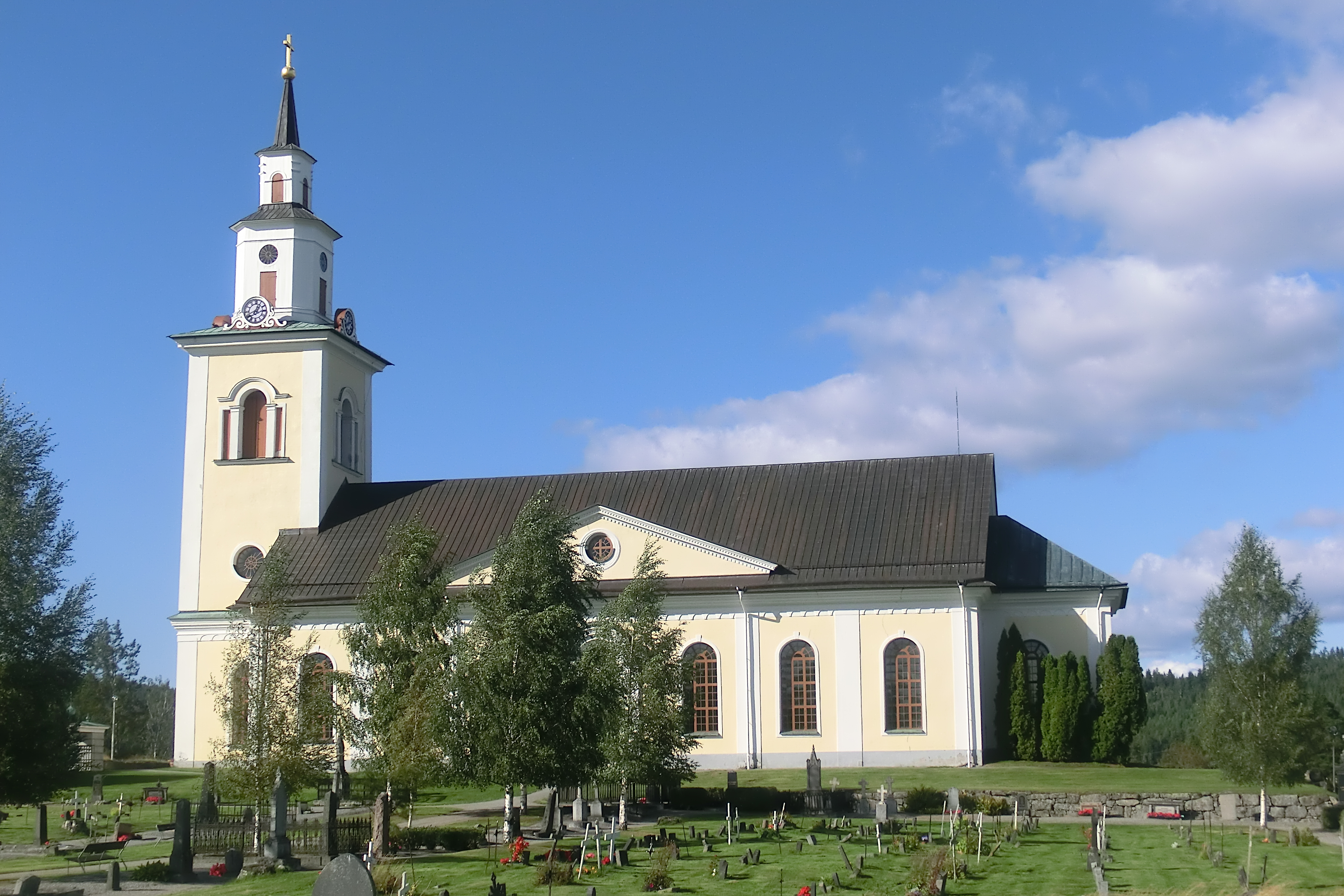

Ytterlännas new church is a Swedish church in Ytterlännäs in the Diocese of Härnösand.

== History ==
The church was built in 1848 when the Ytterlännäs Old Church had become too small for the congregation. The sacristy was previously housed in an extension to the east which was built in 1896. A new sacristy was built to the northeast.

== Organ ==
The original organ of 16 stops built in 1854 at Sundsvall by music director Johan Gustaf Ek (1805-1877). A new organ with 28 stops and two manuals and pedal was built by Setterqvist & Son in Örebro. In 1962 the organ was upgraded 30 voices.
