= Leo M. Reinbold =

American politician

Leo M. Reinbold (March 24, 1933 – February 11, 2010) was an American politician of the North Dakota Republican Party who served as North Dakota Public Service Commissioner from 1981 to 2003.

== Biography ==
Leo Reinbold was born in Glen Ullin, North Dakota in 1933. He was educated in public schools in Hebron, North Dakota, and he graduated from Dickinson State University. He taught school for 25 years in the states of North Dakota and Montana, including 19 years at Valley City State University where he was chairman of the Department of Geography. He was named an Outstanding Educator in America in 1971, and was awarded a Distinguished Alumnus Award from Dickinson State in 1985. He was elected to the North Dakota Public Service Commission in 1980, and he served until his resignation on July 31, 2003, when Parkinson's disease began to have a greater effect on his abilities.

== Notes ==
Preceded by Ben J. Wolf	North Dakota Public Service Commissioner; 1981–2003	Succeeded by Kevin Cramer
