= Ernest D. Nelson =

American politician

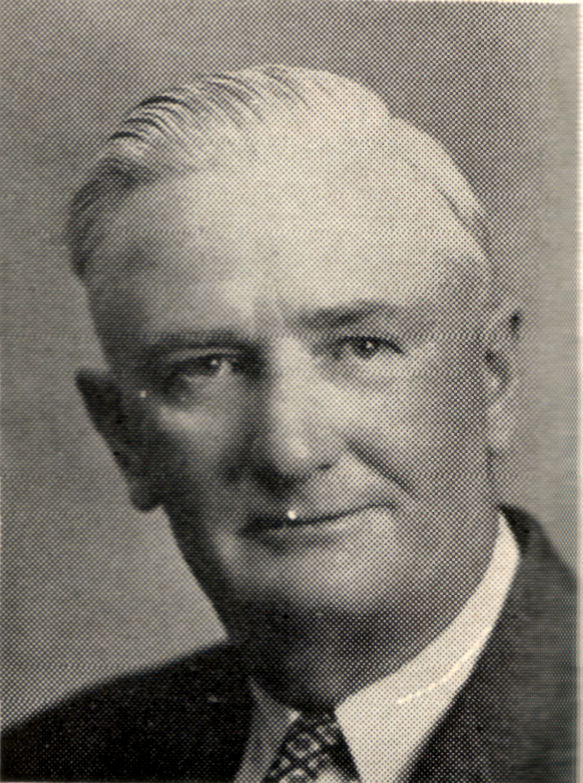
- Ernest D. Nelson

North Dakota Public Service Commissioner
- In office December 3, 1949 – September 10, 1961
- Preceded by: Ben C. Larkin
- Succeeded by: Bruce Hagen

Personal details
- Born: March 13, 1897 Arcadia, Wisconsin
- Died: November 22, 1961 (aged 64) Bismarck, North Dakota
- Party: Republican

Ernest D. Nelson (March 13, 1897 – September 10, 1961) was a North Dakota Republican Party politician who served as a North Dakota Public Service Commissioner from 1949 to his death in 1961.

== Biography ==
Ernest Nelson was born in Arcadia, Wisconsin in 1897. He was the son of Norwegian immigrant August C. Nelson (1865-1957) and Anna (Olsen) Nelson (1860-1952). He came to North Dakota in 1908, and was educated in the public schools and in the University of Wisconsin–Madison. he was a World War I veteran. He farmed in Golden Valley County, North Dakota for 30 years during his lifetime. He was appointed to the North Dakota Public Service Commission by Governor Fred G. Aandahl in 1949 after the death of Ben C. Larkin. He was elected to six year terms in 1952 and in 1958. Nelson died in office on September 10, 1961, at the age of 64. He was buried at Arcadia Cemetery in Trempealeau County, Wisconsin.

== Notes ==
Political offices
Preceded by Ben C. Larkin	North Dakota Public Service Commissioner; 1949–1961	Succeeded by Bruce Hagen
