= Everett H. Brant =

American politician (1885–1954)

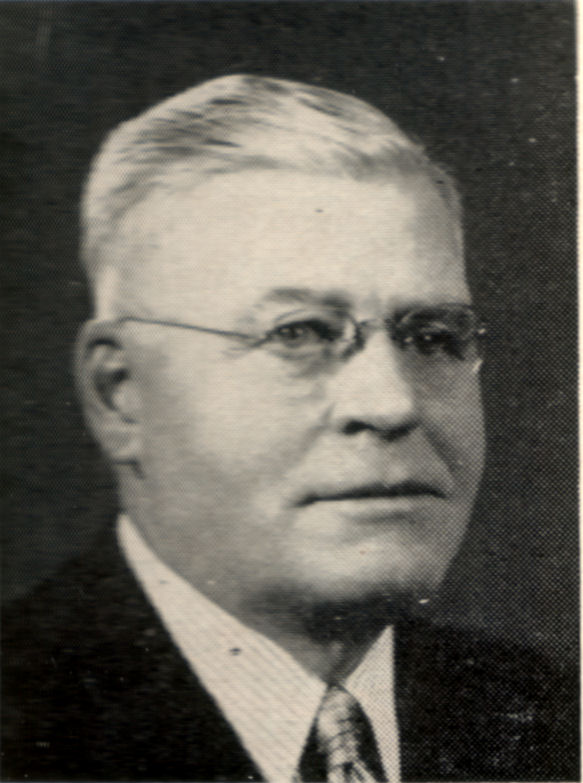
- Everett H. Brant

North Dakota Public Service Commissioner
- In office January 1, 1951 – November 3, 1954
- Preceded by: Clark W. McDonnell
- Succeeded by: Martin Vaaler

Personal details
- Born: February 17, 1885 Dakota Territory
- Died: November 3, 1954 (aged 69) Bismarck, North Dakota
- Party: Republican

Everett Hall Brant (February 17, 1885 – November 3, 1954) was a North Dakota Republican Party politician who served as a North Dakota Public Service Commissioner from 1951 to his death in 1954.

== Biography ==
Everett H. Brant was born in Dakota Territory in 1885. He farmed in Emmons County, North Dakota for many years, and was married in 1913. He had two children, Scott Brant and Mrs. Loma Boyd, both moved to Oakland, California. He was elected as Emmons County Commissioner in 1910 and 1914, and as Emmons County Auditor in 1916, 1918, 1920, and 1922. He served in the North Dakota House of Representatives from 1924 to 1925, and in the North Dakota Senate from 1926 to 1929. Brant served as the Emmons County Treasurer from 1932 to 1935, and then again in the state Senate from 1938 to 1949. He was elected to the North Dakota Public Service Commission in 1950, and served for three years before his death on November 3, 1954, at the age of 69.

== Notes ==
Political offices
Preceded by Clark W. McDonnell	North Dakota Public Service Commissioner; 1951–1954	Succeeded by Martin Vaaler
