= Haaken Gulleson =

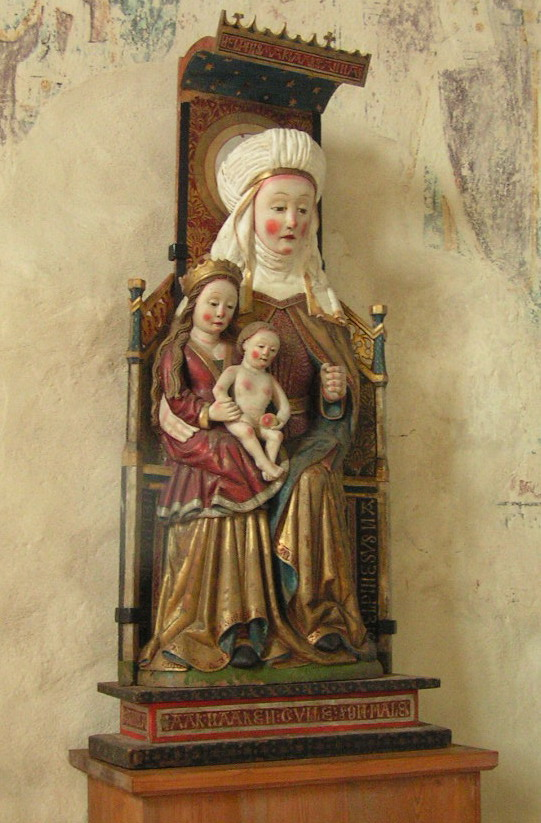
The Virgin and Child with St. Anne, in the Enånger Old Church

Haaken Gulleson was a Swedish painter and workshop leader in the early 16th century. His signature is found on six sculptures in southern Norrland. He has long been considered to be solely a sculptor, but recent research has seen him as a painter. He ran a workshop where his apprentices contributed to his work.

== Biography ==
He lived in Enånger parish in Gävleborg County, Sweden. His sculpture is in Enånger Old Church and is signed and dated in the year 1520. Another sculpture is a small Madonna image in the Bollnäs church. A signed Madonna is in Forsa Church and there is an altar screen in Njutånger Church. There is one in Bjuråker Church and in Hälsinglands museum.

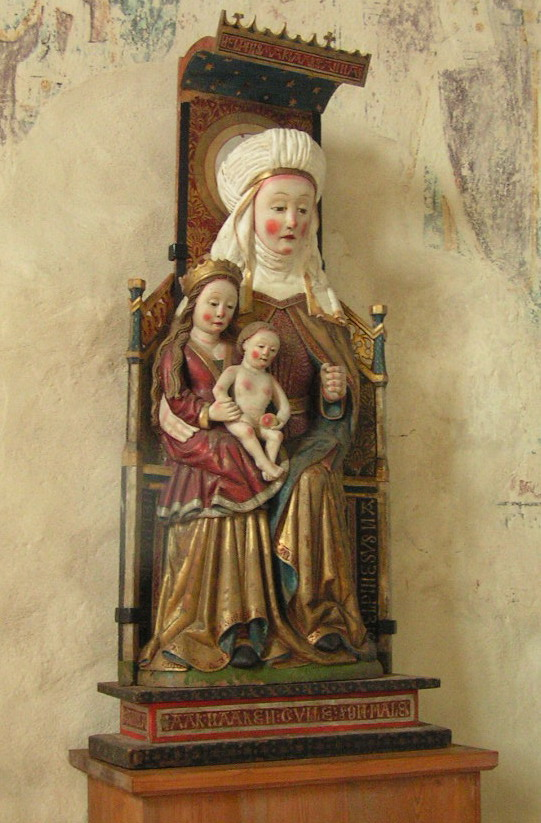
The Virgin and Child with St. Anne, in Enånger Old Church, the old church of Enånger parish, Hälsingland

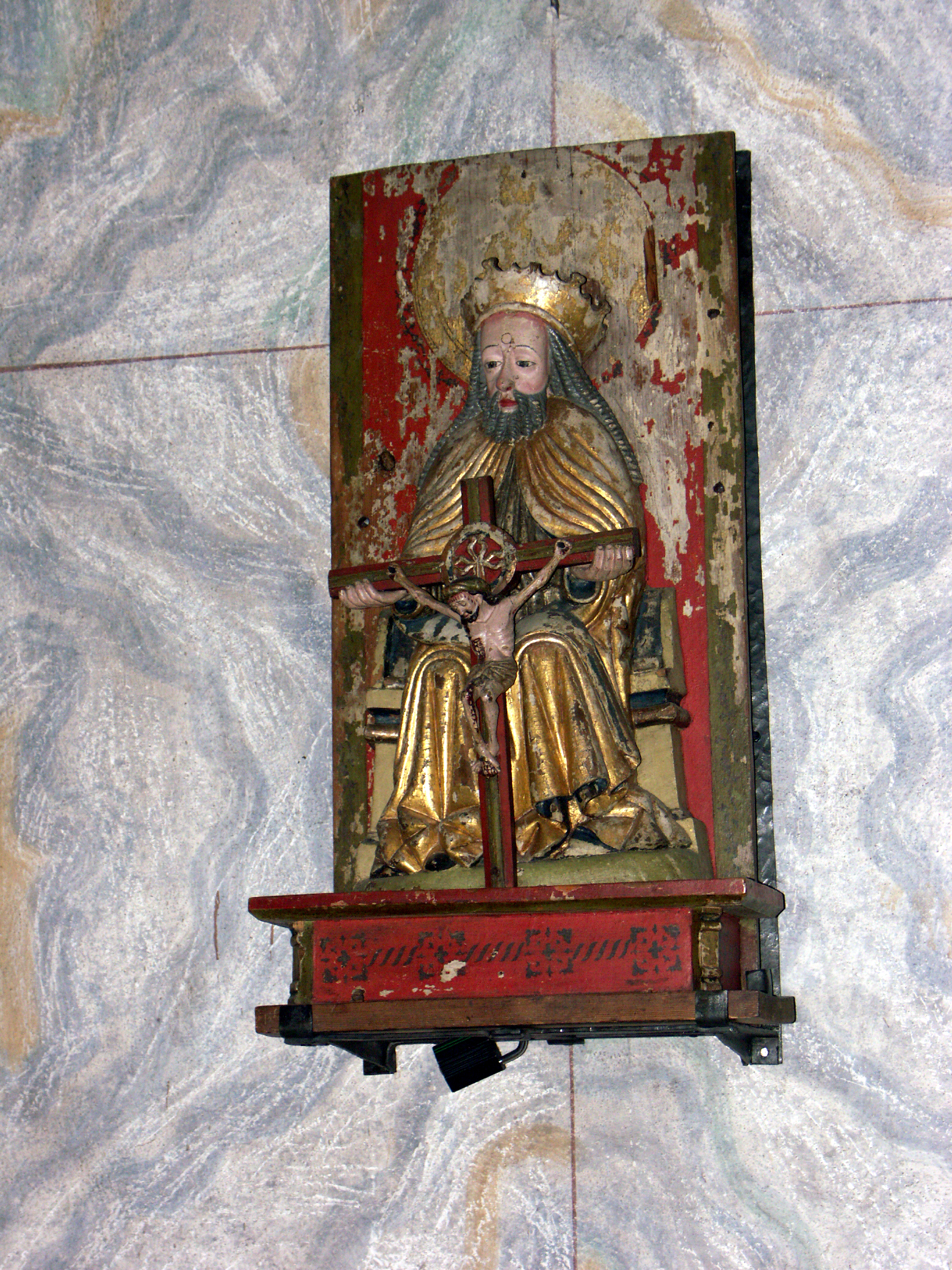
Nådastol (Throne of Grace/Throne of Mercy, Gnadenstuhl), Ljusdals Church

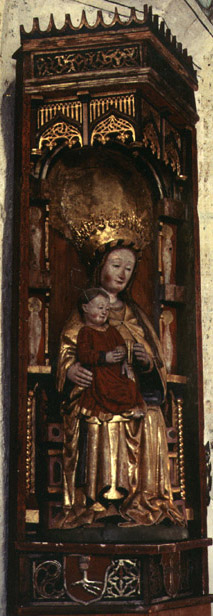
The Virgin Mary in Ytterlännäs gamla kyrka, the Old Church of Ytterlännäs parish, Ångermanland

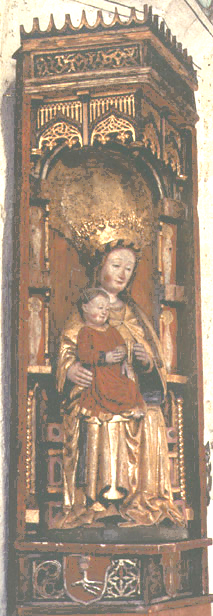
The Virgin Mary in Ytterlännäs gamla kyrka, the Old Church of Ytterlännäs parish, Ångermanland (modified version of previous)

== Other sources ==
- Lennart Karlsson (2005) Kretsen kring Haaken Gulleson (Förlag Carlsson) ISBN 9789172037199
