= Enånger Old Church =

Coordinates: 61°32′42″N 17°00′20″E

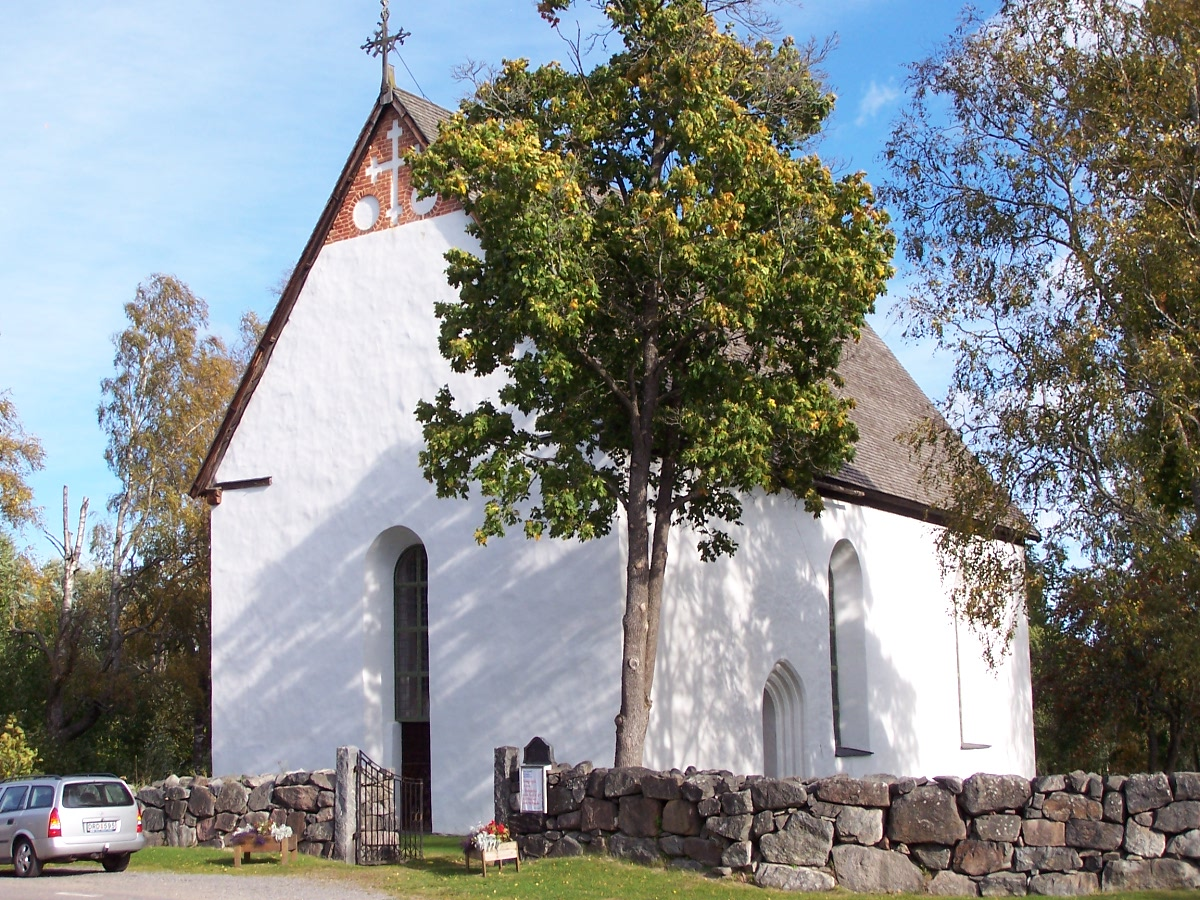
View of the church

The Enånger Old Church (Enångers gamla kyrka in Swedish) is a well-preserved medieval stone church built in the second half of the 15th century, located in Enånger, Sweden. The interiors are decorated with frescoes painted by the Tierp school in 1485. The pulpit was constructed by two masters from Stockholm, dating from 1737. The arched roof inside the church shows male and female saints and angels.

The church has changed little since the 15th century. The walls and arches are decorated with murals that are some of Sweden's best preserved paintings from the middle ages. The town built a newer church to replace this structure in 1858.

A shrine to Saint Anne inside the church carved by sculptor Haaken Gulleson has been dated to 1520.
