= Simon S. McDonald =

American politician

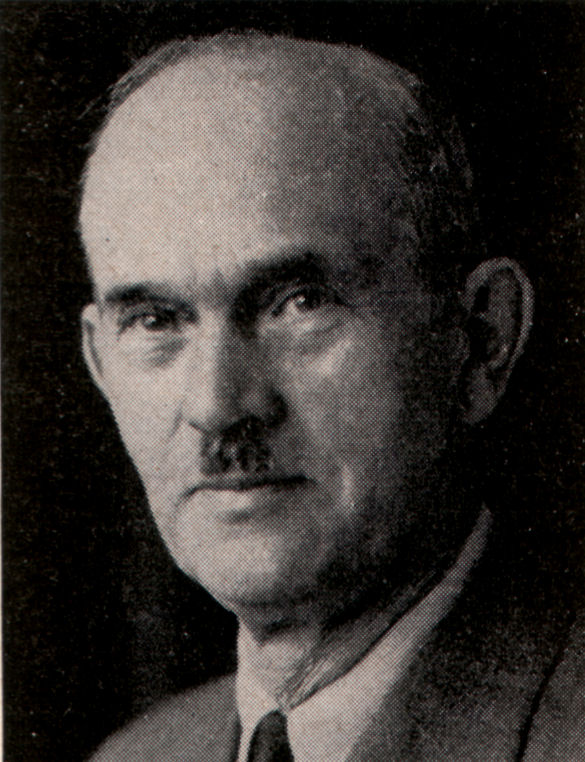
- Simon S. McDonald, circa 1942

North Dakota Public Service Commissioner
- In office January 1, 1941 – December 31, 1948
- Preceded by: Clark W. McDonnell
- Succeeded by: Elmer W. Cart

Personal details
- Born: December 11, 1869
- Died: May 24, 1956 (aged 86) Bismarck, North Dakota
- Party: Republican

Simon S. McDonald (December 11, 1869 – May 24, 1956) was a North Dakota Republican Party politician who served as a North Dakota Public Service Commissioner from 1941 to 1948. Prior to 1941, his title was North Dakota Railroad Commissioner. He had served in that position since 1937.

== Biography ==
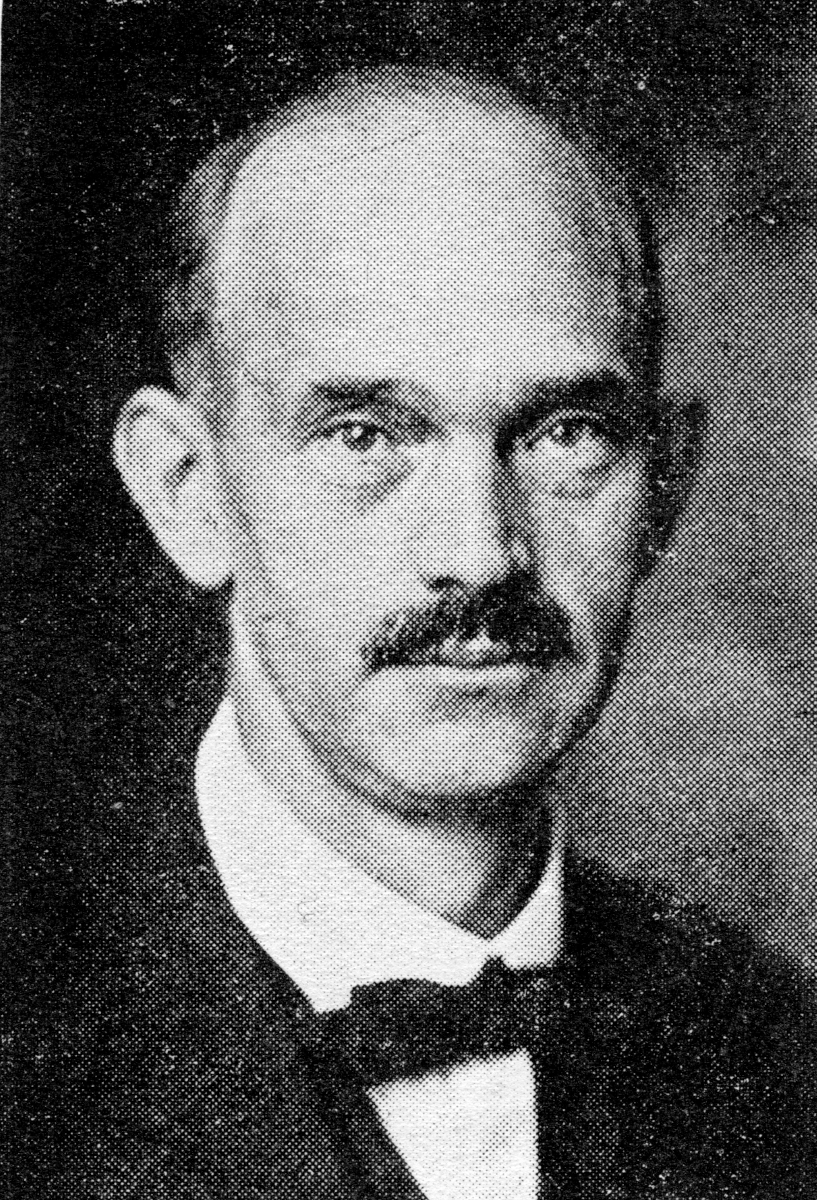
Simon S. McDonald, Commissioner of the North Dakota Workmen's Compensation Bureau, circa 1919

Simon McDonald was born in 1869. He was raised on a farm, educated in the machinist trade, and was employed by daily newspapers in different parts of the United States in his early adult years. He served as the machinist in charge of the mechanical department at the Grand Forks Herald after coming to North Dakota in March 1914. He was elected as President of the North Dakota Federation of Labor in June 1915, and served in that position until June 1920. He was appointed by Governor of North Dakota Lynn Frazier as a member of the Workmen's Compensation Bureau on April 1, 1919, and was re-appointed to the position by Governor Arthur Sorlie in 1925, and served until 1930. He was elected to the North Dakota Senate in 1932, and served there from 1933 to 1936. He was elected to the North Dakota Board of Railroad Commissioners in 1936, which was recreated as the North Dakota Public Service Commission in 1940. He was reelected in 1942, but chose not to seek reelection in 1948, as he was then 79 years old. He died eight years later aged 86 in Bismarck.

== Notes ==
Preceded by Clark W. McDonnell	North Dakota Public Service Commissioner; 1941–1948	Succeeded by Elmer W. Cart
