= Kevin Cramer =

American politician (born 1961)

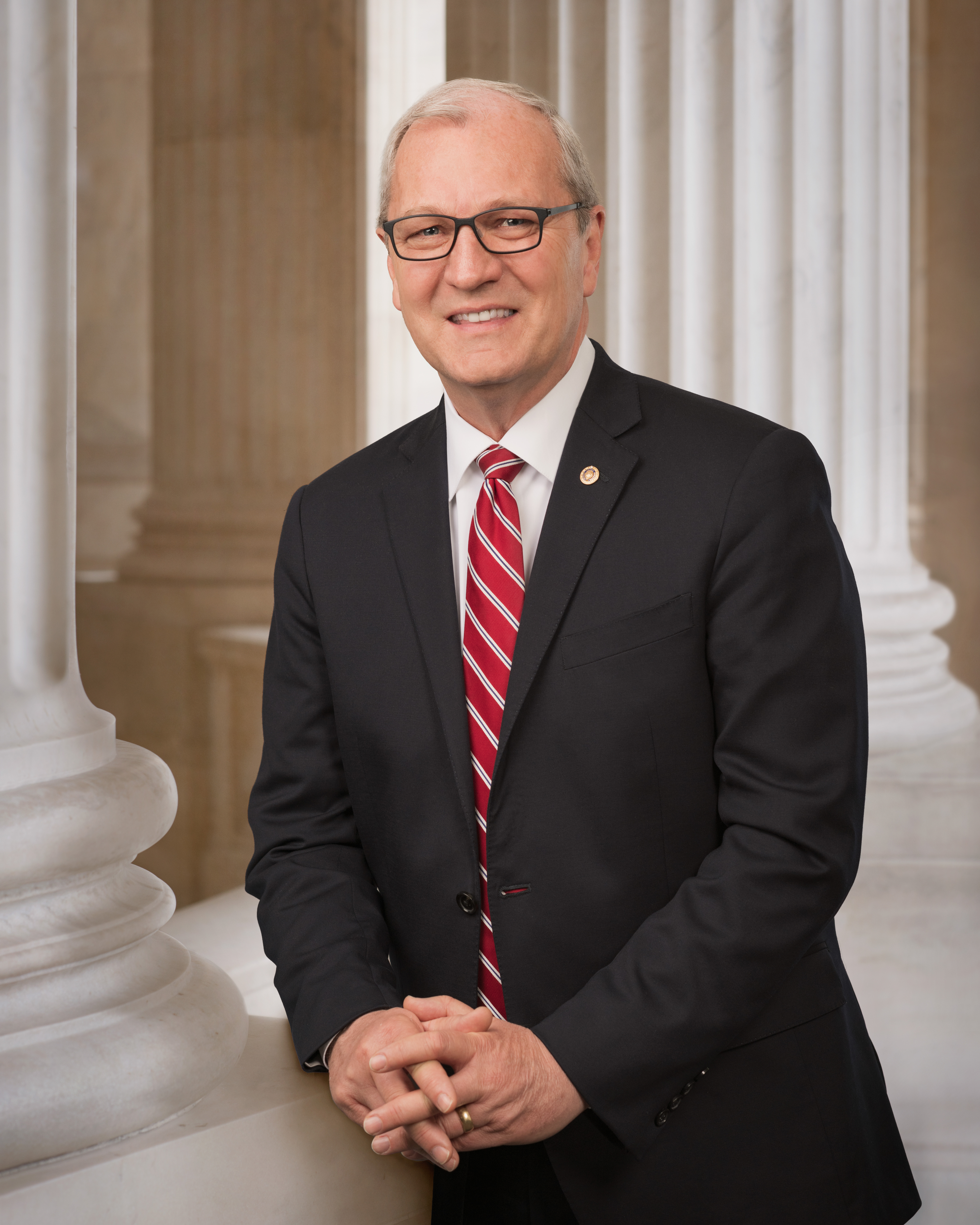
- Official portrait, 2019

United States Senator from North Dakota
- Incumbent
- Assumed office January 3, 2019 Serving with John Hoeven
- Preceded by: Heidi Heitkamp

Member of the U.S. House of Representatives from North Dakota's at-large district
- In office January 3, 2013 – January 3, 2019
- Preceded by: Rick Berg
- Succeeded by: Kelly Armstrong

Member of the North Dakota Public Service Commission
- In office August 1, 2003 – December 31, 2012
- Governor: John Hoeven; Jack Dalrymple
- Preceded by: Leo Reinbold
- Succeeded by: Julie Fedorchak

Chair of the North Dakota Republican Party
- In office July 1991 – May 1993
- Preceded by: Layton Freborg
- Succeeded by: John Korsmo

Personal details
- Born: Kevin John Cramer; January 21, 1961 (age 65) Rolla, North Dakota, U.S.
- Party: Republican
- Spouse: Kris Neumann (m. 1986)
- Children: 5
- Education: Concordia College (BA); University of Mary (MA)
- Website: Senate website Campaign website
- Cramer's voice Cramer outlining the REGROW Act. Recorded June 16, 2021

Kevin John Cramer (born January 21, 1961) is an American politician who has served as the junior United States senator for North Dakota since 2019. A member of the Republican Party, he represented North Dakota's at-large congressional district in the United States House of Representatives from 2013 to 2019.

Cramer chaired the North Dakota Republican Party from 1991 to 1993 and served as state tourism director from 1993 to 1997 and state Economic Development Director from 1997 to 2000. He was on the state Public Service Commission from 2003 to 2012. In 2012, he won election to the U.S. House of Representatives. In 2018, he defeated Senator Heidi Heitkamp, winning his first Senate term and becoming the first Republican to be elected to North Dakota's Class I Senate seat since 1958. He was reelected in 2024, defeating Democratic nominee Katrina Christiansen.

== Early life and education ==
Cramer was born in Rolla, North Dakota, on January 21, 1961, the first of five children of Clarice (Hjelden) and Richard Cramer. He grew up in Kindred, North Dakota, and graduated from Kindred High School. He received a B.A. degree from Concordia College in Moorhead, Minnesota, in 1983. He earned a master's degree in management from the University of Mary in Bismarck, North Dakota, in 2003.

== Early career ==
After college, Cramer campaigned for Scott Hove, the Republican-endorsed tax commissioner candidate, in 1984. In 1986, Cramer campaigned for U.S. Senator Mark Andrews in his bid for reelection. Andrews narrowly lost to North Dakota Democratic–Nonpartisan League Party nominee Kent Conrad. Cramer then worked for the state Republican Party.

Cramer chaired the North Dakota Republican Party from 1991 to 1993. At 30, he was the youngest person to be state party chairman. In May 1993, Governor Ed Schafer appointed Cramer state tourism director. Cramer was preceded by Jim Fuglie and succeeded by Bob Martinson. Cramer served in the position until he was appointed Economic Development Director in June 1997. As director, Cramer was preceded by Chuck Stroup. Lee Peterson succeeded him in December 2000. After a stint as director of economic development, Cramer became director of the Harold Schafer Leadership Foundation in 2000. He served in the position until 2003.

== North Dakota Public Service Commission (2003–2012) ==
In 2003, Governor John Hoeven appointed Cramer to the North Dakota Public Service Commission. He was elected to a six-year term on the commission in 2004, defeating NPL nominee Ron Gumeringer, 65% to 35%. In 2010, Cramer was reelected to the Public Service Commission, defeating Democratic nominee Brad Crabtree, 61% to 35%. Cramer served on the commission until 2012.

== U.S. House of Representatives (2013–2019) ==
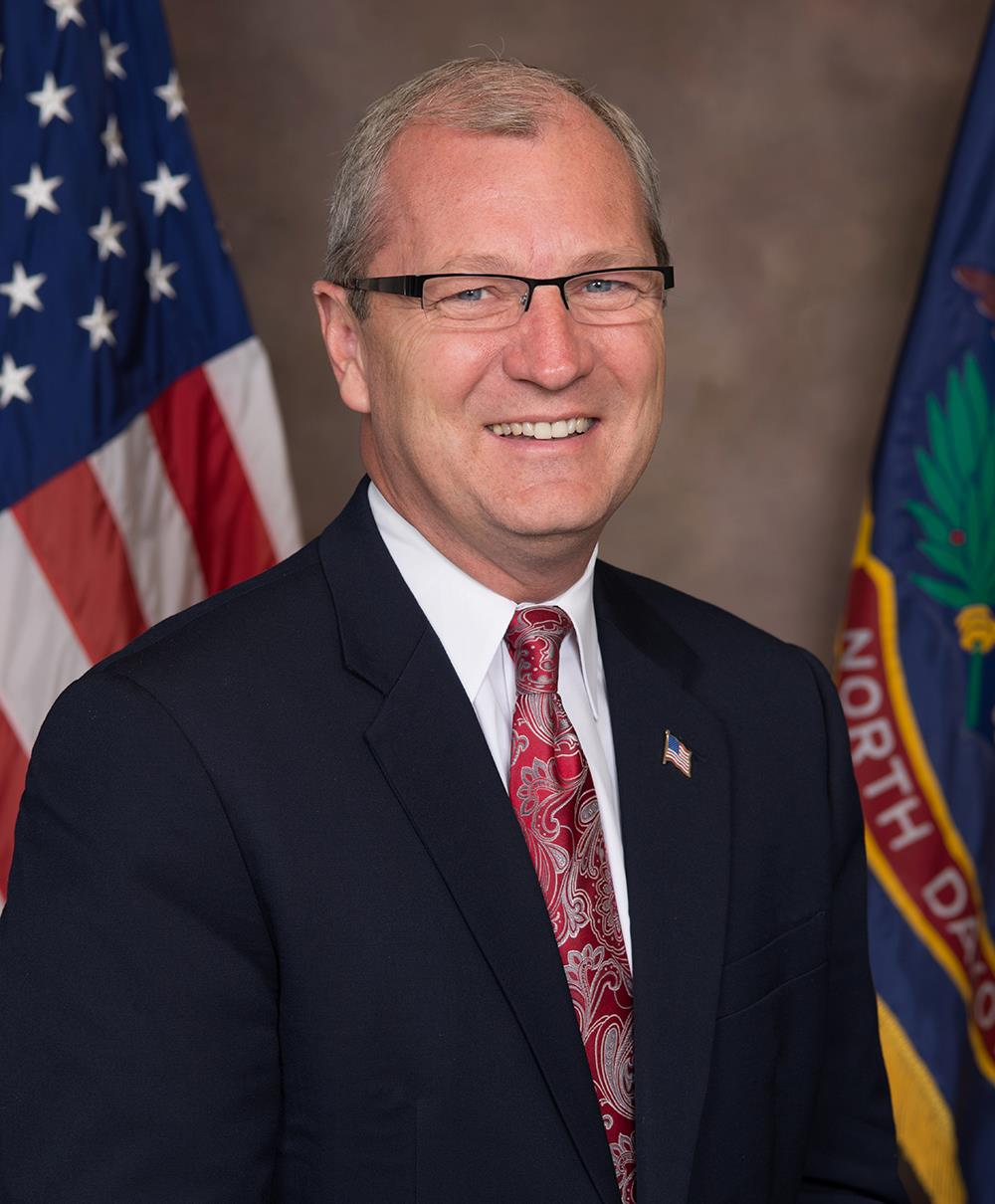
Cramer's first official portrait during the 113th Congress

=== Elections ===
==== 1996 ====
In 1996, House Majority Leader Dick Armey of Texas—a North Dakota native—persuaded Cramer to challenge Democratic U.S. Representative Earl Pomeroy in North Dakota's at-large congressional district. Pomeroy won, 55% to 43%.

==== 1998 ====
In 1998, Cramer challenged Pomeroy again. Pomeroy won, 56% to 41%.

==== 2010 ====
On January 14, Cramer announced that he would run for North Dakota's seat in the United States House of Representatives for a third time in the 2010 election. In early 2010, he appeared at North Dakota town hall meetings, where he opposed the Affordable Care Act. Cramer attended many Tea Party rallies in North Dakota and spoke about energy, taxes, jobs, and the U.S. Constitution. At the state Republican Party convention in March 2010, former House Majority Leader Rick Berg won the Republican congressional nomination; Berg was elected to Congress in November.

==== 2012 ====
In 2012, Berg retired to run for the U.S. Senate. Cramer ran for the seat a fourth time. Various national conservative groups, including FreedomWorks and the Club for Growth, endorsed him, but Berg endorsed Cramer's rival, fellow Public Service Commissioner Brian Kalk. In the Republican primary election in June, Cramer received 54,405 votes (54%) to Kalk's 45,415 (45%).

In the November general election, Cramer defeated Democratic-NPL State Representative Pam Gulleson, with 173,585 votes (55%) to Gulleson's 131,870 (42%). Libertarian Party nominee Eric Olson received about 3% of the vote. Cramer was sworn in on January 3, 2013.

==== 2014 ====
In 2014 Cramer ran for reelection and was unopposed in the Republican primary. He won the general election with 55% of the vote, defeating Democratic-NPL nominee George B. Sinner, who received 38%. Libertarian candidate Jack Seaman received slightly under 6%.

==== 2016 ====
In 2016 Cramer ran for a third term in Congress. He was unopposed in the primary and defeated Democratic-NPL nominee Chase Iron Eyes, a Native American activist, in the general election with 69% of the vote.

=== Tenure and political positions ===
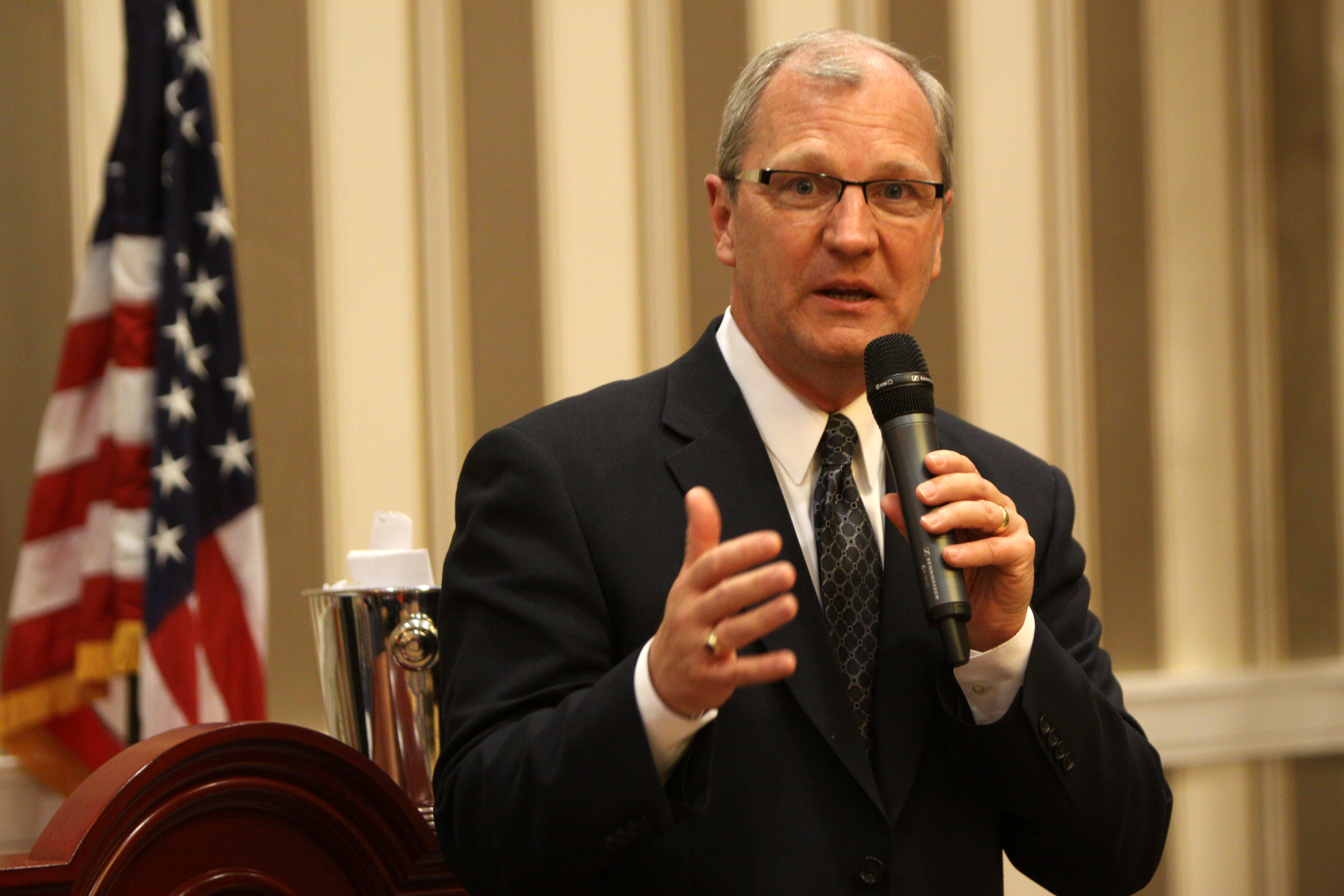
Cramer speaking at the 2013 CPAC in National Harbor, Maryland

==== Abortion ====
Cramer opposes abortion. He is a critic of Planned Parenthood and calls for cutting off public funding of the group. In 2013 Cramer condemned the Supreme Court decision Roe v. Wade and said an uptick in mass shootings was linked to the legalization of abortion and a decline in religious values. The remark was criticized by the director of the North Dakota Democratic Party and in Cosmopolitan. Cramer said, "I was asked recently by a reporter if I am afraid that some people would attack me if I speak like this... I said, 'No, I am not afraid they will, I am quite certain they will.'" In the same speech, Cramer said, "We have normalized perversion and perverted God's natural law."

==== Donald Trump ====
Cramer has been closely allied with President Donald Trump since 2015, when Trump announced his candidacy for president. Cramer was "one of a handful of early Trump endorsers" among U.S. House Republicans. Cramer supported Trump's 2017 executive order banning entry to the U.S. by citizens of seven Muslim-majority countries, saying, "I think what Donald Trump is doing is he's pulling America's head out of the sand and facing the reality that we have not been kept very safe by current immigration and refugee policies." Cramer is said to be one of Trump's allies in Congress and pledged to be with Trump "100 percent of the time".

In February 2017, during Trump's first address to a joint session of Congress, House Minority Leader Nancy Pelosi and a number of other female Democratic members of Congress wore white, a color honoring suffragettes. Cramer mocked them, saying Pelosi dressed "poorly" and remarking, "It is a syndrome. There is no question, there is a disease associated with the notion that a bunch of women would wear bad-looking white pantsuits in solidarity with Hillary Clinton to celebrate her loss. You cannot get that weird." In June 2020, Cramer blocked bipartisan legislation to sanction China over its actions to undermine Hong Kong's independence—legislation he had co-sponsored—because the Trump administration requested that he do so. On May 28, 2021, Cramer voted against creating an independent commission to investigate the January 6 United States Capitol attack.

==== Environment and energy ====
Cramer rejects the scientific consensus on climate change. He has said that he would support a small carbon tax if the revenue went to research and development on clean fuel. Reuters has said Cramer is "one of America's most ardent drilling advocates." He supports an increase in oil and gas drilling on public lands and cutting taxes for energy producers; he opposes what he characterizes as overreach by the United States Environmental Protection Agency. In May 2016 Trump asked Cramer to draft Trump's campaign's energy policy. Cramer wrote Trump's energy plan, which heavily promoted fossil fuels, weakened environmental regulation, promising to withdraw the U.S. from the Paris Agreement and repeal U.S. regulations of carbon emissions. In June 2023, Cramer was the lead Republican sponsor of the PROVE IT Act, which would direct the United States Department of Energy to collect data on the greenhouse gas intensity of certain goods made in the U.S. and other countries, data that could enable trade policy addressing international disparities in environmental standards. He was joined by lead Democratic sponsor Chris Coons.

==== Food stamps ====
Cramer supports cuts in Supplemental Nutrition Assistance Program (formerly the Food Stamp Program), and attracted controversy in 2013 when he cited a Biblical quotation several times in support of Republicans' efforts to cut $40 billion from the program over 10 years.

==== Gun policy ====
Cramer said that gun control would not have prevented the Orlando nightclub shooting. In 2016 he criticized proposed gun control legislation, saying, "The problem isn't the U.S. Constitution. The problem is Islamic terrorism."

==== Health care ====
Cramer opposes the Affordable Care Act ("Obamacare") and voted to repeal it without a replacement five times. He has voted against health insurance protections for patients with preexisting conditions and against the expansion of Medicaid. He said that the American Health Care Act of 2017, the Republican bill he supported to repeal and replace Obamacare, would have prevented "price discrimination" against people with preexisting conditions; The Washington Post fact-checker called the assertion false.

During the COVID-19 pandemic, Cramer introduced legislation to ban vaccine and mask mandates. He opposed adding unruly passengers to the No Fly List, saying that unruly passengers who refuse to comply with mask requirements are not the same as terrorists.

==== LGBT rights ====
Cramer opposes same-sex marriage and castigated the Supreme Court's decision in Obergefell v. Hodges.

==== Supreme Court nomination of Brett Kavanaugh ====
In 2018, Cramer called both Anita Hill's sexual harassment allegation against Clarence Thomas and Christine Blasey Ford's sexual assault allegation against Brett Kavanaugh "absurd". He called Ford's allegation "even more absurd" than Hill's because the sexual assault that Ford said happened "never went anywhere" and because both Kavanaugh and Ford were intoxicated teenagers. Cramer questioned whether Ford's allegation would disqualify Kavanaugh from the Supreme Court even if true, but said that if Kavanaugh were found to have lied in denying the allegation, that would be disqualifying.

==== Taxes ====
Cramer has voted to repeal the estate tax, which imposes a tax after the first several million dollars on a dead person's estate. He supports Trump's 25% tax on many types of imports, which may have decreased sales for North Dakota's soybean industry in 2018, but said he believes the long-term benefits of a trade war are worth it.

==== Violence Against Women Act ====
In 2013, at a forum on the Violence Against Women Act (VAWA), Cramer engaged in "a testy exchange with Native American victim assistance leaders." He later released a statement apologizing for his "tone and rhetoric" during the exchange. He voted to reauthorize VAWA, but opposed language in the act that would allow tribal courts to prosecute non-Natives "for abusing or assaulting Native American women on Indian land." Cramer asked, "How could a non-Native man get a fair trial on a reservation?" and questioned the provision's constitutionality. He voted for an amendment to repeal it.

Committee assignments

- Committee on Energy and Commerce
  - Subcommittee on Communications and Technology
  - Subcommittee on Environment and the Economy
  - Subcommittee on Oversight and Investigations

Caucus memberships

- Congressional NextGen 9-1-1 Caucus
- Congressional Western Caucus
- Congressional Coalition on Adoption (co-chair)

== U.S. Senate (2019–present) ==
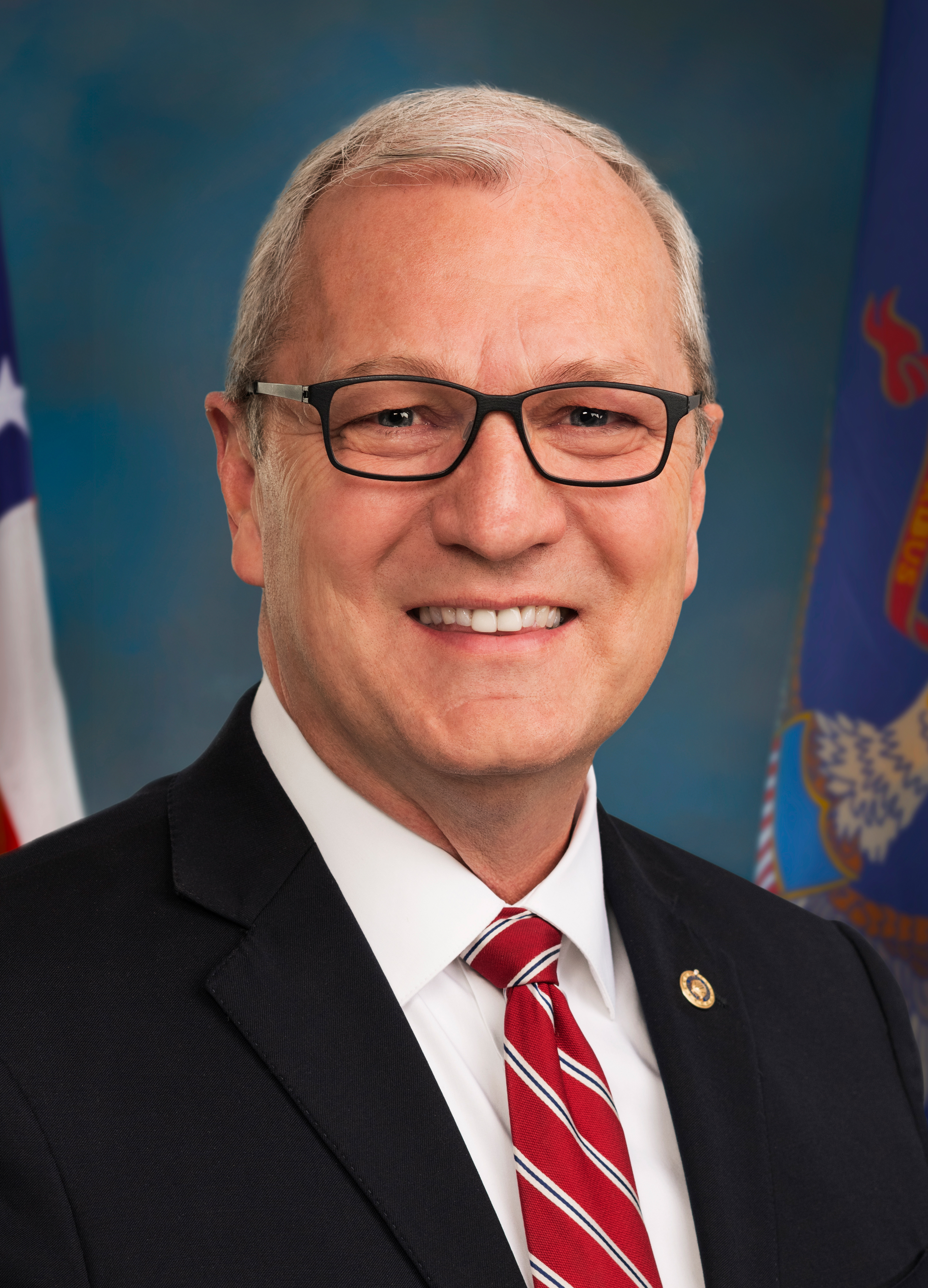
Cramer during the 116th Congress

=== Elections ===
==== 2018 ====
On January 11, 2018, after months of speculation, Cramer announced that he would not seek the Republican nomination for U.S. Senate to run against Democratic-NPL incumbent Heidi Heitkamp and would instead run for reelection to the U.S. House. On February 15, he announced that he had changed his mind and was running for the Senate. Odney advertising firm president Pat Finken served as Cramer's campaign manager. On April 7, Cramer won the North Dakota Republican Party's endorsement. Three days later, his campaign announced it had raised $1.35 million in the first quarter of 2018, most of it in late February and March.

In June 2018, The Washington Post reported that Cramer had contacted the White House to seek political help in his Senate campaign and was upset that Trump had not publicly criticized Heitkamp in the same way he had criticized other Democrats. Cramer later publicly criticized White House staff and argued that Trump was refraining because Heitkamp was a woman. Trump scheduled a trip to North Dakota that month to campaign for Cramer, a trip that Politico reported "could go a long way toward extinguishing tensions between the White House and the Senate hopeful."

During his 2018 campaign, Cramer sought and received the support of the Public Advocate of the United States, an anti-LGBT group that advocates conversion therapy and ties homosexuality to pedophilia. In an eight-question survey for the group, he said he would oppose "'Transgender Bathrooms' legislation and regulations—which have the effect of encouraging and protecting pedophiles". He also agreed with the organization that "public schools should be 'prevented from brainwashing elementary school children with the Homosexual Agenda.'" Cramer supported requiring schools to teach that there are only two genders and granting Christian businesses the right to not service same-sex weddings. A spokesman for Cramer said: "Let's be clear. Congressman Cramer doesn't support the teaching of history with any special emphasis on any particular group. History is history and should be taught as such. Additionally, Kevin does not think transgender people are at all comparable to pedophiles—this a gross misinterpretation of the survey question."

Cramer won the Republican nomination for the U.S. Senate on June 12, 2018. In July 2018, a spokesperson for the political network organized by the Koch brothers announced that they would not financially support Cramer's campaign because the brothers viewed him as insufficiently supportive of free trade and fiscal conservatism, and because they felt he held other views inconsistent with theirs. In the November 6 general election, Cramer defeated Heitkamp with 55% of the vote to Heitkamp's 44%.

==== 2024 ====
In 2024, Cramer was reelected over Democratic nominee Katrina Christiansen with 66% of the vote to Christiansen's 33%.

=== Tenure ===
In July 2019, Cramer said he favored lawsuits seeking to overturn Obamacare. Also in 2019, he held up the confirmation of a White House budget official to get the U.S. Army Corps of Engineers to release sensitive documents about border wall construction. Cramer had pushed the Army Corps to use a North Dakota firm run by his 2018 campaign donor Tommy Fisher. Fisher donated $10,000 to Cramer's campaign and was also Cramer's guest at the 2018 State of the Union Address, where he shook Trump's hand. In December 2019, Fisher Industries, based in Dickinson, North Dakota, and the Fisher Sand and Gravel subsidiary, run by a Trump donor, were awarded the $400 million contract. Fisher Sand & Gravel had been fined $1.16 million for violating tax laws racking up 1,300 air-quality violations and over $625,000 in fines.

In October 2019, Cramer defended Trump's decision to host the G7 conference at the Trump National Doral Miami, a resort Trump owns. Cramer said, "I don't have any concerns about it other than just politically how it appears", and commended Trump for the "tremendous integrity in his boldness and his transparency" in deciding to select his own property to hold the summit. Lack of support from Trump's Republican allies who were weary of defending him led Trump to quickly abandon his plans, as customary congressional support withered. In December 2019, at Trump's request, Cramer cast the only vote against a Senate motion to recognize the Armenian genocide, passage of which required unanimous consent. Trump opposed the motion because of his relationship with Recep Tayyip Erdoğan, president of Turkey. Senator Lindsey Graham had voted against such a motion previously, but refused to do so after Trump withdrew a contingent of U.S. troops, allowing the Turks to attack the U.S.'s Kurdish allies who had rolled back the Islamic State in Syria's forces. On March 24, 2020, Cramer tweeted that House Speaker Nancy Pelosi was "retarded". He later deleted the tweet and apologized, saying he had intended to write "ridiculous", blaming autocorrect and "fat fingers".

After Joe Biden won the 2020 presidential election and Trump refused to concede and made numerous baseless claims of fraud, Cramer at first defended Trump but later said "the election was not stolen" and that he had "moved on a long time ago". In May 2022, Cramer expressed support for former Secretary of State Mike Pompeo's potential candidacy in the 2024 Republican presidential primary. In June 2023, Cramer endorsed North Dakota Governor Doug Burgum for president. After Burgum dropped out of the race on December 4, Cramer endorsed Trump. In 2025, Cramer defended Trump's and DOGE's proposed government cuts including those to the United States Department of Veterans Affairs.

Committee assignments

For the 119th United States Congress, Cramer was named to four Senate committees:

- Committee on Armed Services
  - Subcommittee on Airland (Chair)
  - Subcommittee on Emerging Threats and Capabilities
  - Subcommittee on Strategic Forces
  - Subcommittee on Readiness and Management Support
- Committee on Banking, Housing, and Urban Affairs
  - Subcommittee on Financial Institutions and Consumer Protection
  - Subcommittee on Housing, Transportation and Community Development
  - Subcommittee on Securities, Insurance, and Investment
- Committee on Environment and Public Works
- Committee on Veterans' Affairs

== Personal life ==
Cramer and Kris Neumann married in 1986. He adopted her two sons from a previous marriage. As of 2026, the couple has five children and six grandchildren. Their son Isaac died in 2018 due to complications of alcoholism. They had earlier adopted the young son of an ex-girlfriend of Isaac's, who had been killed by her abusive husband.

Kevin Cramer co-chairs the Roughrider Honor Flight program. The program gives World War II veterans the chance to visit the World War II Memorial in Washington, D.C. In June 2022, Cramer suffered a serious injury to his right hand while doing yard work. The injury required immediate surgery and he remained in North Dakota due to a high risk of infection and the possible need for finger amputation.

On December 6, 2023, Kris Cramer drove her son, Ian, to the emergency room of Sanford Health in Bismarck, as he was experiencing a mental health crisis after using methamphetamines and bath salts earlier that day. When they arrived, Ian stole his mother's car. He was pursued by police until he collided with a police vehicle, killing Mercer County deputy Paul Martin. On December 14, 2023, prosecutors announced that they would charge Ian with multiple crimes, including homicide. After the event, Senator Cramer said that Ian "suffers from serious mental disorders which manifest in severe paranoia and hallucinations". In December 2024, Ian Cramer pleaded guilty to the charges and was sentenced to 28 years in prison.

== Electoral history ==
Republican primary results, North Dakota, 2012
| Party | Candidate | Votes | % |
|---|---|---|---|
| Republican | Kevin Cramer | 54,405 | 54.4 |
| Republican | Brian Kalk | 45,415 | 45.5 |
| Write-in | | 113 | 0.1 |
| Total votes | | 99,933 | 100.0 |

North Dakota's at-large congressional district, 2012
| Party | Candidate | Votes | % | ±% |
|---|---|---|---|---|
| Republican | Kevin Cramer | 173,585 | 54.89% | +0.15% |
| Democratic–NPL | Pam Gulleson | 131,870 | 41.70% | −3.23% |
| Libertarian | Eric Olson | 10,261 | 3.24% | N/A |
| Write-in | | 508 | 0.16% | -0.17% |
| Total votes | | 316,224 | 100.0% | N/A |
| Republican hold | | | | |

Republican primary results, 2014
| Party | Candidate | Votes | % |
|---|---|---|---|
| Republican | Kevin Cramer (incumbent) | 50,188 | 99.70 |
| Write-in | | 151 | 00.30 |
| Total votes | | 50,339 | 100 |

North Dakota's at-large congressional district, 2014
| Party | Candidate | Votes | % | ±% |
|---|---|---|---|---|
| Republican | Kevin Cramer (incumbent) | 138,100 | 55.54% | +0.67% |
| Democratic–NPL | George B. Sinner | 95,678 | 38.48% | −3.24% |
| Libertarian | Jack Seaman | 14,531 | 5.84% | +2.59% |
| Write-in | | 361 | 0.15% | -0.01% |
| Total votes | | 248,670 | 100.0% | N/A |
| Republican hold | | | | |

Republican primary results, 2016
| Party | Candidate | Votes | % |
|---|---|---|---|
| Republican | Kevin Cramer (incumbent) | 96,357 | 99.1 |
| Write-in | | 919 | 0.9 |
| Total votes | | 97,276 | 100.0 |

North Dakota's at-large congressional district, 2016
| Party | Candidate | Votes | % | ±% |
|---|---|---|---|---|
| Republican | Kevin Cramer (incumbent) | 233,980 | 69.13% | +13.59% |
| Democratic–NPL | Chase Iron Eyes | 80,377 | 23.75% | −14.73% |
| Libertarian | Jack Seaman | 23,528 | 6.95% | +1.11% |
| Write-in | | 574 | 0.17% | +0.02% |
| Total votes | | 338,459 | 100.0% | N/A |
| Republican hold | | | | |

Republican primary results, North Dakota 2018
| Party | Candidate | Votes | % |
|---|---|---|---|
| Republican | Kevin Cramer | 61,529 | 87.8% |
| Republican | Thomas O'Neill | 8,509 | 12.2% |
| Write-in | | 95 | 0.14% |
| Total votes | | 70,133 | 100% |

United States Senate election in North Dakota, 2018
| Party | Candidate | Votes | % | ±% |
|---|---|---|---|---|
| Republican | Kevin Cramer | 179,720 | 55.11% | +5.79% |
| Democratic–NPL | Heidi Heitkamp (incumbent) | 144,376 | 44.27% | −5.97% |
| Write-in | | 2,042 | 0.63% | N/A |
| Total votes | | 326,138 | 100% | N/A |
| Republican gain from Democratic–NPL | | | | |

2024 United States Senate election in North Dakota
| Party | Candidate | Votes | % | ±% |
|---|---|---|---|---|
| Republican | Kevin Cramer (incumbent) | 241,569 | 66.31% | +11.20% |
| Democratic–NPL | Katrina Christiansen | 121,602 | 33.38% | −10.89% |
| Write-in | | 1,156 | 0.32% | -0.31% |
| Total votes | | 364,327 | 100.00% | N/A |
| Republican hold | | | | |

Party political offices
| Preceded by Layton Freborg | Chair of the North Dakota Republican Party; 1991–1993 | Succeeded by John Korsmo |
| Preceded by Rick Berg | Republican nominee for U.S. Senator from North Dakota (Class 1); 2018, 2024 | Most recent |
Political offices
| Preceded by Leo Reinbold | Member of the North Dakota Public Service Commission; 2003–2012 | Succeeded by Julie Fedorchak |
U.S. House of Representatives
| Preceded by Rick Berg | Member of the U.S. House of Representatives from North Dakota's at-large congressional district 2013–2019 | Succeeded by Kelly Armstrong |
U.S. Senate
| Preceded by Heidi Heitkamp | U.S. Senator (Class 1) from North Dakota; 2019–present Served alongside: John Hoeven | Incumbent |
U.S. order of precedence (ceremonial)
| Preceded by Jacky Rosen | Order of precedence of the United States as United States Senator | Succeeded by Rick Scott |
| Preceded by Marsha Blackburn | United States senators by seniority 65th | Succeeded by Jacky Rosen |
