= Ben C. Larkin =

American politician (1873–1949)

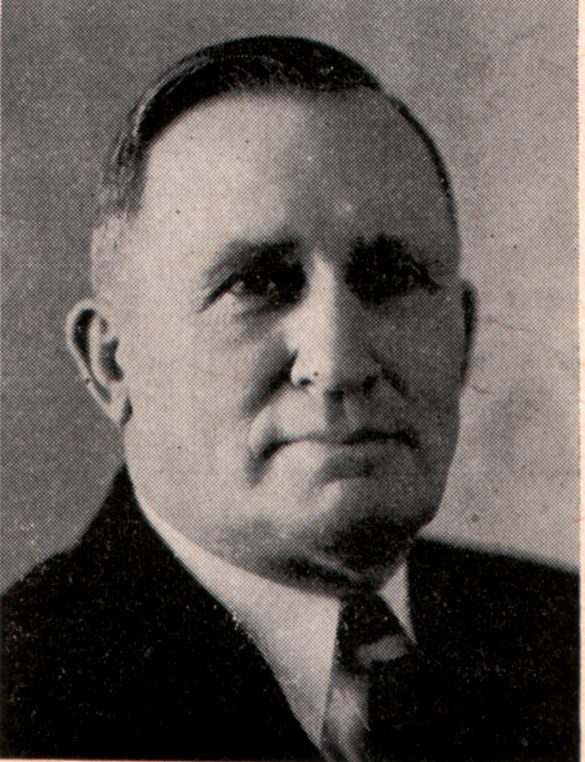
- Ben C. Larkin

North Dakota Public Service Commissioner
- In office January 1, 1941 – November 22, 1949
- Preceded by: Elmer W. Cart
- Succeeded by: Ernest D. Nelson

Personal details
- Born: May 13, 1873 Wisconsin
- Died: November 22, 1949 (aged 76) Bismarck, North Dakota
- Party: Republican

Ben C. Larkin (May 13, 1873 – November 22, 1949) was a North Dakota Republican Party politician who served as a North Dakota Public Service Commissioner from 1941 to his death in 1949. Prior to 1941, his title was North Dakota Railroad Commissioner. He had served in that position since 1928.

== Biography ==
Ben Larkin was born in Wisconsin in 1873. He came to North Dakota in 1891, and worked on farms while he attended school. He graduated from the Commercial Department at Fargo College, and then managed a lumber yard for eight years. He farmed in Eddy County for 20 years, and served in the North Dakota House of Representatives from 1919 to 1926, and served as the Speaker of the House in 1925. He was appointed as the Chief Elevator Accountant for the North Dakota Railroad Commission in 1925, and served in that capacity until 1928. He then was appointed by Governor Arthur G. Sorlie to the Railroad Commission in 1928 after the resignation of David F. 'Frank' Milhollan. When the North Dakota Board of Railroad Commissioners was restructured into the North Dakota Public Service Commission in 1940, two seats were opened as part of the reorganization, one shortened 4-year term and one full 6-year term. Despite having been reelected in 1938, Larkin chose to run again and won the 6-year term, effectively moving him to a new seat. He was reelected again in 1946, but died in office on November 22, 1949, at the age of 76.

== Notes ==
Political offices
Preceded by Elmer W. Cart	North Dakota Public Service Commissioner; 1941–1949	Succeeded by Ernest D. Nelson
