= Pam Gulleson =

American politician

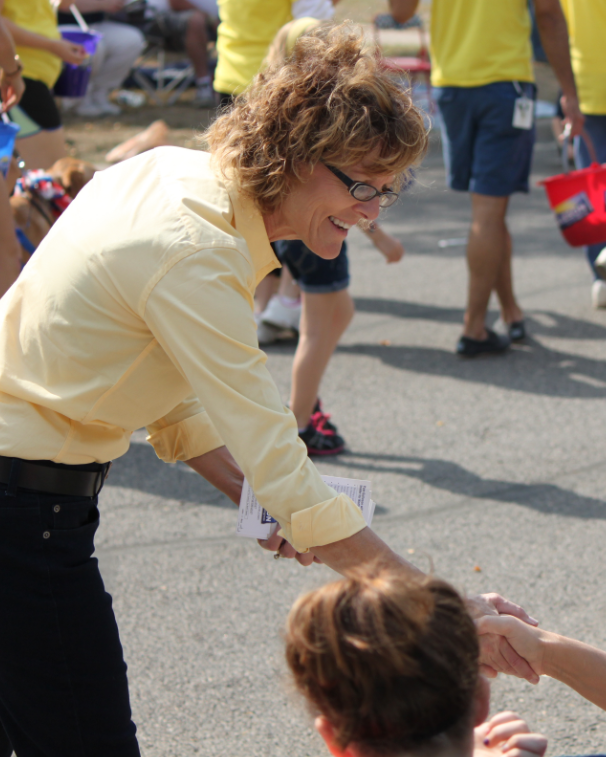
- Gulleson, at a parade in West Fargo.

Member of the North Dakota House of Representatives from the 26th district
- In office 1993–2009
- Succeeded by: Jerry Kelsh

Personal details
- Party: North Dakota Democratic-NPL Party
- Spouse: Bill Gulleson
- Education: North Dakota State University, Minnesota State University
- Profession: licensed nutritionist, farmer/rancher
- Website: Pam Gulleson for Congress

Pam Gulleson is a former member of the North Dakota House of Representatives for the North Dakota Democratic-NPL Party, representing the 26th district from 1993 to 2009. She is now Vice President of Public Affairs at Blue Cross Blue Shield of North Dakota.

== Early life, education, and early political career ==
Pam and her husband Bill farm corn, beans, and alfalfa. They operate a cattle feedlot. She got a BS in education and nutrition from NDSU and a degree in public administration from MSUM. Pam's sons are now the fifth generation of Gullesons to farm and ranch near Rutland in Sergeant County. Gulleson was raised on a dairy farm near Oakes, North Dakota.

She also served as Senior Legislative Advisor and Chief of Staff for former U.S. Senator Byron Dorgan for nine years. she advanced major initiatives on farm, energy, trade, Native Americans, water development, flood protection, and research. She is especially known for her work in creating the Red River Valley Research Corridor. Pam also worked as an executive officer and advisor to the president for North Dakota Farmers Union. Pam also worked as director of Public Health in Sergeant County and directing programming at the North Dakota State College of Science in Wahpeton.

== North Dakota House of Representatives ==
=== Elections ===
She was elected in 1992 and won re-election every four years after that. In 2000, she won re-election with 28%. In 2004, she won re-election with 53%.

=== Tenure ===
She held many leadership positions over the years. She was the assistant Democratic House minority leader in the late 1990s. In 1996, she criticized Governor Ed Schafer in the official Democratic response to Schafer's State of the State address saying that he thinks "the governorship is a personal trophy".

=== Committee assignments ===
Standing

- Appropriations

Interim

- Budget Section
- Public Safety
- Workforce

== 2012 congressional election ==
On September 21, 2011, Gulleson announced her candidacy for the Democratic-NPL Party nomination for North Dakota's at-large congressional district in the 2012 election. Gulleson was unopposed in the nominating contest, but lost the election to Republican Kevin Cramer.
