= Layton Freborg =

American politician (1933–2026)

Member of the North Dakota House of Representatives from the 8th district
- In office 1973–1976
- In office 1979–1982

Member of the North Dakota Senate from the 8th district
- In office 1985 – December 2012

Personal details
- Born: May 13, 1933 Underwood, North Dakota, U.S.
- Died: February 20, 2026 (aged 92)
- Party: Republican
- Spouse: Widowed
- Children: 4 daughters
- Profession: Building contractor

Layton W. Freborg (May 13, 1933 – February 20, 2026) was an American politician in the state of North Dakota. He represented the 8th district in the North Dakota House of Representatives from 1973 to 1976 and 1979 to 1982, and the 8th district in the North Dakota State Senate from 1985 to 2012. He was the Chairman of the State Senate Education Committee from 1995 to 2012. He also was Chairman of the North Dakota Republican Party from 1985 to 1991. Freborg died from complications of Alzheimer's disease on February 20, 2026, at the age of 92.
