= Elmer W. Cart =

American politician (1891–1980)

- Elmer W. Cart

North Dakota Public Service Commissioner
- In office January 1, 1949 – December 31, 1954
- Preceded by: Simon S. McDonald
- Succeeded by: Anson J. Anderson

Personal details
- Born: August 11, 1891 Marion County, Iowa
- Died: February 6, 1980 (aged 88) Bismarck, North Dakota
- Party: Republican

Elmer W. Cart (August 11, 1891 – February 6, 1980) was a North Dakota Republican Party politician who served on the North Dakota Board of Railroad Commissioners from 1935 to 1940 and its successor, the North Dakota Public Service Commission, from 1949 to 1954.

== Biography ==
Elmer W. Cart was born in Marion County, Iowa, in 1891. He came to North Dakota with his parents in 1906, and was educated in the public schools of that state. He also attended a course at the North Dakota Agricultural College. He married Nettie Lawson of Luck, Wisconsin, in June 1929. They had one daughter, Mary Ann. Nettie died in 1952 at age 59. He farmed in Burke County from 1915 to 1935, and owned a 480-acre (1.9 km^{2}) farm during his time as Public Service Commissioner. He was a member of the Lutheran Church and served in the North Dakota House of Representatives from 1921 to 1926. He was elected to the North Dakota Railroad Commission in 1934, serving one term until losing the primary election in 1940. After the commission was reorganized into the North Dakota Public Service Commission in 1940, he won another term in 1948, served a six-year term, only to lose the 1954 primary election. Cart died on February 6, 1980, at the age of 88.

== Notes ==
Preceded by Simon S. McDonald	North Dakota Public Service Commissioner; 1949–1954	Succeeded by Anson J. Anderson
