= Nyland, Sweden =

Nyland
- Location within Västernorrland Location within Sweden
- Coordinates: 63°00′25″N 17°45′36″E
- Country: Sweden
- Province: Ångermanland
- County: Västernorrland County
- Municipality: Kramfors Municipality

Area
  - Total: 2.63 km^{2} (1.02 sq mi)

Population (31 December 2010)
  - Total: 903
  - Density: 344/km^{2} (890/sq mi)
- Time zone: UTC+1 (CET)
  - Summer (DST): UTC+2 (CEST)
- Climate: Dfc

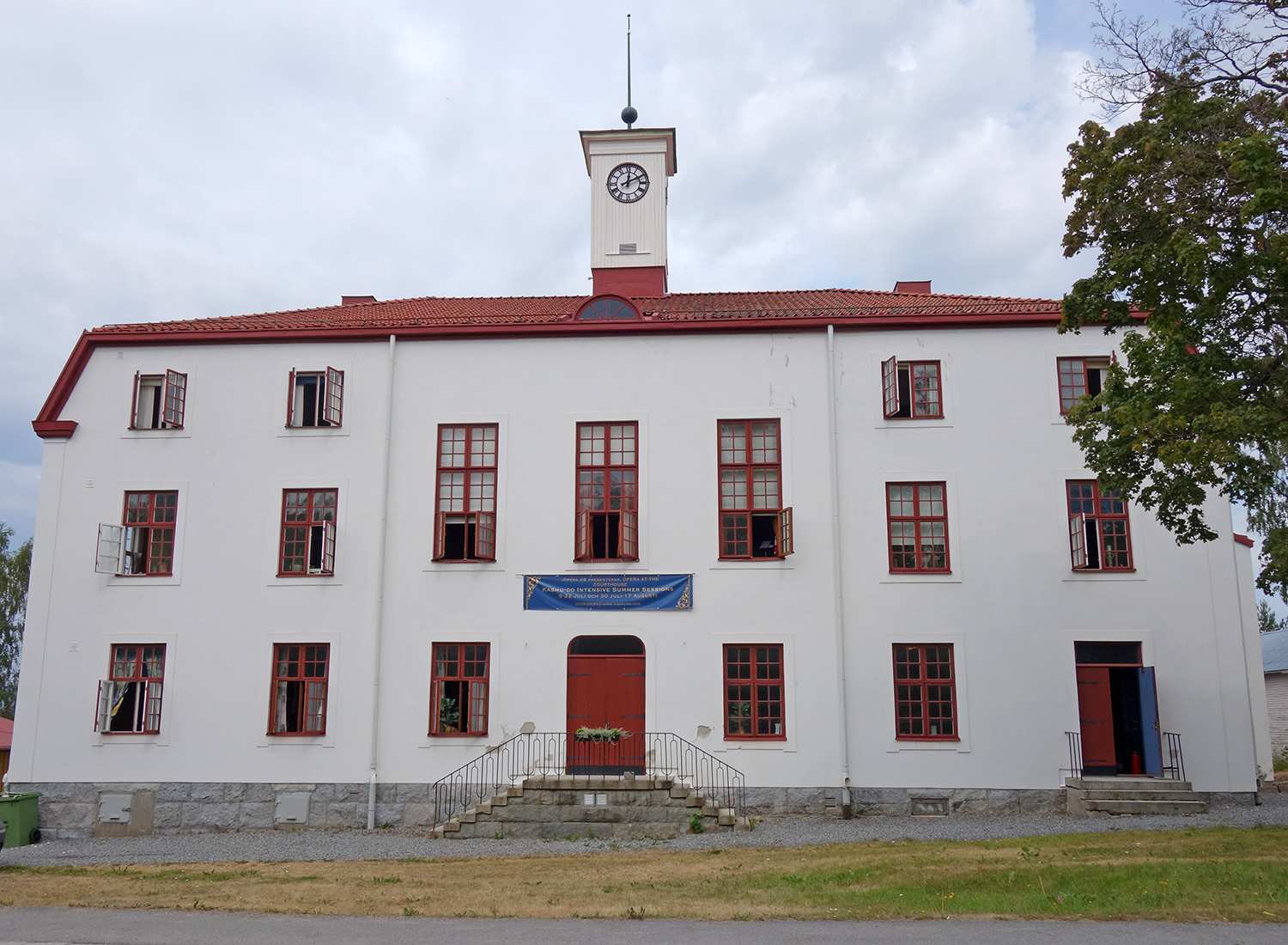
The old courthouse in Nyland, Kramfors Municipality, Sweden.

Nyland (Swedish pronunciation: [ˈny̌ːland]) is a locality situated in Kramfors Municipality, Västernorrland County, Sweden with 903 inhabitants in 2010.
