= Bollstabruk =

- Location within Västernorrland Location within Sweden
- Coordinates: 63°00′N 17°41′E
- Country: Sweden
- Province: Ångermanland
- County: Västernorrland County
- Municipality: Kramfors Municipality

Area
  - Total: 4.44 km^{2} (1.71 sq mi)

Population (31 December 2010)
  - Total: 1,871
  - Density: 422/km^{2} (1,090/sq mi)
- Time zone: UTC+1 (CET)
  - Summer (DST): UTC+2 (CEST)
- Climate: Dfc

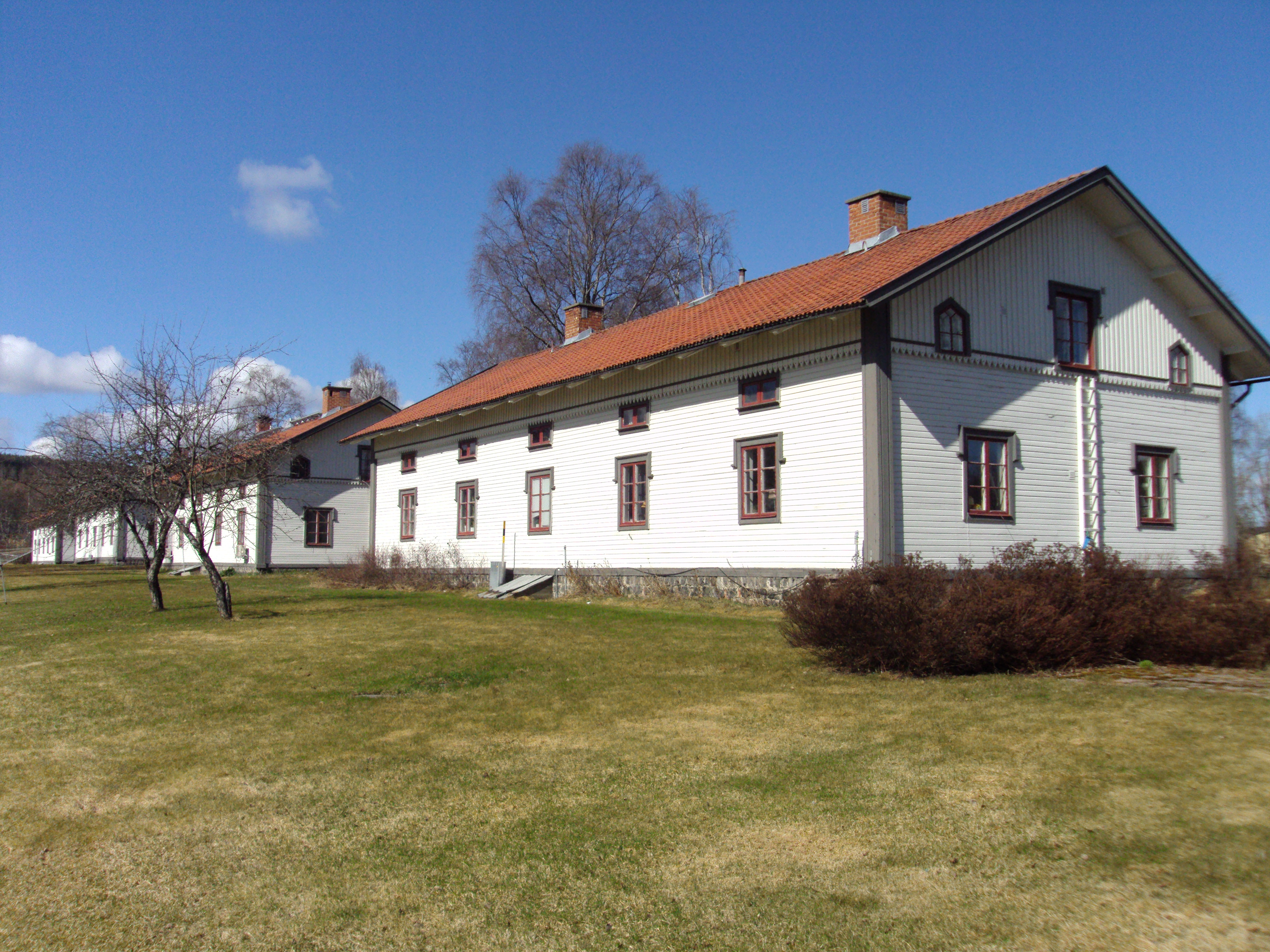
Kejsarstaden, Bollstabruk

Bollstabruk is a locality situated in Kramfors Municipality, Västernorrland County, Sweden with 1,871 inhabitants in 2010.
