= 2024 United States House of Representatives election in North Dakota =

2024 United States House of Representatives election in North Dakota's at-large district
- November 5, 2024
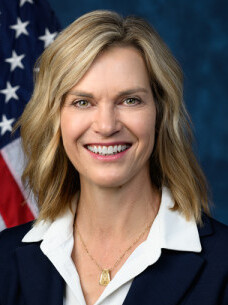

Nominee	Julie Fedorchak	Trygve Hammer
Party	Republican	Democratic–NPL
Popular vote	249,101	109,231
Percentage	69.24%	30.36%
- Fedorchak: 40–50% 50–60% 60–70% 70–80% 80–90% >90% Hammer: 50–60% 60–70% 70–80% 80–90% Tie: 50% No votes
U.S. Representative before election
Kelly Armstrong
Republican
Elected U.S. Representative
Julie Fedorchak
Republican

The 2024 United States House of Representatives election in North Dakota were held on November 5, 2024, to elect a member of the United States House of Representatives to represent the state of North Dakota from its at-large congressional district. The election coincided with the 2024 U.S. presidential election, as well as other elections to the U.S. House, elections to the United States Senate, and various other state and local elections. The primary elections were held on June 11, 2024.

Incumbent Republican representative Kelly Armstrong was re-elected with 62.2% of the vote in 2022 against an independent candidate. He did not seek re-election in 2024, instead choosing to run for governor. Incumbent Public Service Commissioner Julie Fedorchak won the Republican primary and defeated the Democratic challenger, Trygve Hammer, in the general election with 69 percent of the vote.

== Republican primary ==
=== Candidates ===
==== Nominee ====
- Julie Fedorchak, member of the North Dakota Public Service Commission (2012–2025)

==== Eliminated in primary ====
- Alex Balazs, farmer and former U.S. State Department project manager
- Rick Becker, former state representative from the 7th district (2012–2022), candidate for governor in 2016, and independent candidate for U.S. Senate in 2022
- Sharlet Mohr, activist
- Cara Mund, lawyer, Miss America 2018, and independent candidate for U.S. House in 2022

==== Withdrawn ====
- Kelly Armstrong, incumbent U.S. representative (2019–2024) (ran for governor)
- Tom Campbell, former state senator from the 19th district (2012–2018) and candidate for U.S. House in 2018 (previously ran for governor)

==== Declined ====
- Kirsten Baesler, North Dakota Superintendent of Public Instruction (2013–2025) (ran for re-election) (endorsed Fedorchak)
- Thomas Beadle, North Dakota State Treasurer (2021–present) (ran for re-election) (endorsed Fedorchak)
- Rick Berg, former U.S. representative (2011–2013), former chair of the North Dakota Republican Party (2018–2021), and nominee for U.S. Senate in 2012
- Kevin Black, member of the North Dakota State Board of Higher Education
- Jonathan Casper, former state senator (2014–2018)
- Scott Davis, former executive director of the North Dakota Indian Affairs Commission
- Jon Godfread, North Dakota Insurance Commissioner (2016–present) (endorsed Fedorchak)
- Michael Howe, North Dakota Secretary of State (2023–present) (endorsed Fedorchak)
- Brian Kroshus, North Dakota State Tax Commissioner (2022–present)
- Eric Murphy, state representative (2022–present)
- Wade Webb, Cass County District Court judge
- Drew Wrigley, North Dakota Attorney General (2022–present) (endorsed Fedorchak)

=== Endorsements ===
During the North Dakota Republican Party endorsement convention, Rick Becker encouraged his supporters to write in spoiler ballots to prevent an endorsement from going through, as Becker was ineligible to receive the endorsement due to a rule change about keeping party membership for a certain amount of years in response to his independent senate campaign. After two failed ballots, Julie Fedorchak withdrew from the endorsement to allow the convention to continue, giving Alex Balazs the endorsement.

Alex Balazs

Organizations

- North Dakota Republican Party
Rick Becker

U.S. senators

- Rand Paul, U.S. senator from Kentucky (2011–present)

U.S. representatives

- Lauren Boebert, U.S. representative from Colorado's 3rd congressional district (2021–present)
- Josh Brecheen, U.S. representative from Oklahoma's 2nd congressional district (2023–present)
- Andrew Clyde, U.S. representative from Georgia's 9th congressional district (2021–present)
- Warren Davidson, U.S. representative from Ohio's 8th congressional district (2016–present)
- Matt Gaetz, U.S. representative from Florida's 1st congressional district (2017–2024)
- Bob Good, U.S. representative from Virginia's 5th congressional district (2021–2025)
- Paul Gosar, U.S. representative from Arizona's 9th congressional district (2011–present)
- Andy Harris, U.S. representative from Maryland's 1st congressional district (2011–present)
- Thomas Massie, U.S. representative from Kentucky's 4th congressional district (2012–present)
- Ron Paul, former U.S. representative from Texas's 14th congressional district (1976–1977, 1979–1985, 1997–2013)
- Scott Perry, U.S. representative from Pennsylvania's 10th congressional district (2013–present)
- Chip Roy, U.S. representative from Texas's 21st congressional district (2019–present)

State legislators

- Keith Boehm, state senator from the 33rd district (2022–present)
- David Clemens, state senator from the 16th district (2017–present)
- Jordan Kannianen, state senator from the 4th district (2017–present)
- Kent Weston, state senator from the 9th district (2022–present)
- 21 state representatives

Individuals

- Vivek Ramaswamy, entrepreneur and former 2024 presidential candidate

Organizations

- House Freedom Fund
- Republicans for National Renewal
Julie Fedorchak

U.S. presidents

- Donald Trump, 45th & 47th president of the United States (2017–2021, 2025-present)

Executive branch officials

- Ed Schafer, former U.S. Secretary of Agriculture (2008–2009) and former governor of North Dakota (1992–2000)

U.S. senators

- John Hoeven, U.S. senator for North Dakota (2011–present)

U.S. representatives

- Elise Stefanik, U.S. representative for New York's 21st congressional district and chair of the House Republican Conference

Statewide officials

- Kirsten Baesler, North Dakota Superintendent of Public Instruction (2013–2025)
- Thomas Beadle, North Dakota State Treasurer (2021–present)
- Doug Burgum, governor of North Dakota (2016–2024)
- Randy Christmann, Public Service Commissioner (2012–present)
- Josh Gallion, North Dakota State Auditor (2017–present)
- Jon Godfread, North Dakota Insurance Commissioner (2016–present)
- Doug Goehring, North Dakota Agriculture Commissioner (2009–present)
- Sheri Haugen-Hoffart, Public Service Commissioner (2022–present)
- Drew Wrigley, North Dakota Attorney General (2022–present)

State legislators

- 20 state senators
- 34 state representatives

Organizations

- Republican Jewish Coalition

=== Debates ===
WFZG news hosted a primary debate between Balazs, Becker, and Fedorchak on April 12, 2024.

On May 11, BEK TV hosted a debate between all the candidates. However, Fedorchak and Mohr were unable to attend, leaving just Becker, Balazs, and Mund.

On May 24, a third debate was hosted by KFGO news between all candidates except Mohr. Again on June 6, a fourth debate was hosted by WDAY News between all candidates except Mohr.

2024 North Dakota Congressional election Republican primary debate
No.	Date	Host	Moderator	Link	Republican	Republican	Republican	Republican	Republican
Key: P Participant A Absent N Not invited I Invited W Withdrawn									
Key: P Participant A Absent N Not invited I Invited W Withdrawn					Alex Balazs	Rick Becker	Julie Fedorchak	Sharlet Mohr	Cara Mund
1	April 12, 2024	WFZG News	Scott Hennen & Steve Hallstrom	YouTube	P	P	P	N	N
2	May 11, 2024	BEK TV	Dale Wetzel	BEK	P	P	A	A	P
3	May 24, 2024	KFGO News	Paul Jurgens, Jim Shaw, & Amy Dalrymple	Omny	P	P	P	A	P
4	June 6, 2024	WDAY News	Steve Hallstrom, Scott Hennen	YouTube	P	P	P	A	P

=== Polling ===
Poll source	Date(s) administered	Sample size (Note: Key: A – all adults RV – registered voters LV – likely voters V – unclear)	Margin of error	Alex Balazs	Rick Becker	Julie Fedorchak	Cara Mund	Other	Undecided
WPA Intelligence (Note: Poll sponsored by the North Dakota News Cooperative)	May 20–22, 2024	500 (LV)	± 4.4%	5%	25%	32%	10%	0% (Note: Sharlet Mohr with 0%)	28%
DFM Research (D) (Note: Poll sponsored by North Dakota United, a union for teachers and public sector workers)	May 6–8, 2024	400 (LV)	± 4.9%	5%	29%	26%	14%	0%	26%

=== Fundraising ===
Campaign finance reports as of June 30, 2024
Candidate	Raised	Spent	Cash on hand
Alex Balazs (R)	$133,039	$81,625	$51,413
Rick Becker (R)	$982,290	$633,916	$348,374
Julie Fedorchak (R)	$1,388,553	$1,124,137	$264,415
Cara Mund (R)	$18,933	$4,085	$30,386
Source: Federal Election Commission

=== Results ===
Primary results by county Fedorchak: 30–40%; 40–50%; 50–60%; Becker: 30–40%; 40–50%; Balazs: 30–40%; Tie: 30–40%

Republican primary results
Party	Candidate	Votes	%
Republican	Julie Fedorchak	43,137	45.9
Republican	Rick Becker	27,771	29.6
Republican	Cara Mund	18,343	19.5
Republican	Alex Balazs	3,758	4.0
Republican	Sharlet Mohr	795	0.8
Write-in		109	0.1
Total votes		93,913	100.0

== Democratic-NPL primary ==
=== Candidates ===
==== Nominee ====
- Trygve Hammer, teacher

==== Eliminated in primary ====
- Roland Riemers, property manager, former member of the Libertarian National Committee, and perennial candidate

=== Endorsements ===
Trygve Hammer

Organizations

- North Dakota Democratic-Nonpartisan League Party

Individuals

- Joan Jett, singer

=== Polling ===
Poll source	Date(s) administered	Sample size	Margin of error	Trygve Hammer	Roland Riemers	Undecided
DFM Research (D)	May 6–8, 2024	104 (LV)	± 9.6%	54%	4%	42%

=== Fundraising ===
Campaign finance reports as of June 30, 2024
Candidate	Raised	Spent	Cash on hand
Trygve Hammer (D)	$560,154	$397,248	$162,905
Source: Federal Election Commission

=== Results ===
Primary results by county Hammer: 50–60%; 60–70%; 70–80%; 80–90%; Riemers: 50–60%

Democratic-NPL primary results
Party	Candidate	Votes	%
Democratic–NPL	Trygve Hammer	14,088	73.4
Democratic–NPL	Roland Riemers	5,042	26.3
Write-in		75	0.4
Total votes		19,205	100.0

== General election ==
=== Predictions ===
Source	Ranking	As of
The Cook Political Report	Solid R	December 12, 2023
Inside Elections	Solid R	December 15, 2023
Sabato's Crystal Ball	Safe R	June 8, 2023
Elections Daily	Safe R	June 8, 2023
CNalysis	Solid R	November 16, 2023
Decision Desk HQ	Solid R	June 1, 2024

=== Post-primary endorsements ===
Julie Fedorchak (R)

Organizations

- American Israel Public Affairs Committee (AIPAC)
- National Federation of Independent Businesses
- Republican Jewish Coalition
- Susan B. Anthony Pro-Life America

=== Polling ===
Poll source	Date(s) administered	Sample size	Margin of error	Julie Fedorchak (R)	Trygve Hammer (D)	Undecided
WPA Intelligence (Note: Poll sponsored by North Dakota News Cooperative)	September 28–30, 2024	500 (LV)	± 4.4%	53%	28%	19%
Public Opinion Strategies (Note: Poll sponsored by Brighter Future Alliance)	June 15–19, 2024	500 (LV)	± 4.4%	64%	25%	10%

=== Results ===
2024 United States House of Representatives election in North Dakota
Party	Candidate	Votes	%
Republican	Julie Fedorchak	249,101	69.24%
Democratic–NPL	Trygve Hammer	109,231	30.36%
Write-in		1,455	0.40%
Total votes		359,787	100.00%
Republican hold			

==== By county ====
County	Julie Fedorchak Republican		Trygve Hammer Democratic-NPL		Write-in Various		Margin		Total
County	#	%	#	%	#	%	#	%	Total
Adams	982	82.73%	201	16.93%	4	0.34%	781	65.80%	1,187
Barnes	3,600	68.87%	1,614	30.88%	13	0.25%	1,986	38.00%	5,227
Benson	1,140	59.22%	777	40.36%	8	0.42%	363	18.86%	1,925
Billings	550	85.54%	90	14.00%	3	0.47%	460	71.54%	643
Bottineau	2,637	77.51%	750	22.05%	15	0.44%	1,887	55.47%	3,402
Bowman	1,368	85.18%	233	14.51%	5	0.31%	1,135	70.67%	1,606
Burke	880	84.86%	148	14.27%	9	0.87%	732	70.59%	1,037
Burleigh	37,214	72.91%	13,465	26.38%	362	0.71%	23,749	46.53%	51,041
Cass	50,662	56.78%	38,349	42.98%	220	0.25%	12,313	13.80%	89,231
Cavalier	1,479	75.57%	472	24.12%	6	0.31%	1,007	51.46%	1,957
Dickey	1,795	74.82%	603	25.14%	1	0.04%	1,192	49.69%	2,399
Divide	913	77.83%	258	21.99%	2	0.17%	655	55.84%	1,173
Dunn	1,866	84.97%	322	14.66%	8	0.36%	1,544	70.31%	2,196
Eddy	867	72.55%	323	27.03%	5	0.42%	544	45.52%	1,195
Emmons	1,567	84.07%	277	14.86%	20	1.07%	1,290	69.21%	1,864
Foster	1,344	79.76%	337	20.00%	4	0.24%	1,007	59.76%	1,685
Golden Valley	840	86.69%	124	12.80%	5	0.52%	716	73.89%	969
Grand Forks	18,749	61.39%	11,741	38.44%	51	0.17%	7,008	22.95%	30,541
Grant	1,072	82.84%	213	16.46%	9	0.70%	859	66.38%	1,294
Griggs	982	77.75%	278	22.01%	3	0.24%	704	55.74%	1,263
Hettinger	1,064	84.24%	194	15.36%	5	0.40%	870	68.88%	1,263
Kidder	1,137	82.81%	230	16.75%	6	0.44%	907	66.06%	1,373
LaMoure	1,626	77.35%	476	22.65%	0	0.00%	1,150	54.71%	2,102
Logan	875	86.63%	130	12.87%	5	0.50%	745	73.76%	1,010
McHenry	2,040	75.11%	666	24.52%	10	0.37%	1,374	50.59%	2,716
McIntosh	1,132	82.39%	237	17.25%	5	0.36%	895	65.14%	1,374
McKenzie	4,540	84.23%	824	15.29%	26	0.48%	3,716	68.94%	5,390
McLean	4,180	78.07%	1,135	21.20%	39	0.73%	3,045	56.87%	5,354
Mercer	3,733	84.04%	689	15.51%	20	0.45%	3,044	68.53%	4,442
Morton	12,536	76.21%	3,822	23.24%	91	0.55%	8,714	52.98%	16,449
Mountrail	2,833	70.83%	1,154	28.85%	13	0.33%	1,679	41.98%	4,000
Nelson	1,158	66.78%	573	33.04%	3	0.17%	585	33.74%	1,734
Oliver	860	82.45%	178	17.07%	5	0.48%	682	65.39%	1,043
Pembina	2,374	77.23%	693	22.54%	7	0.23%	1,681	54.68%	3,074
Pierce	1,508	77.57%	421	21.66%	15	0.77%	1,087	55.92%	1,944
Ramsey	3,648	70.67%	1,499	29.04%	15	0.29%	2,149	41.63%	5,162
Ransom	1,679	64.55%	919	35.33%	3	0.12%	760	29.22%	2,601
Renville	988	82.61%	194	16.22%	14	1.17%	794	66.39%	1,196
Richland	5,571	68.91%	2,496	30.87%	18	0.22%	3,075	38.03%	8,085
Rolette	1,517	38.39%	2,429	61.46%	6	0.15%	-912	-23.08%	3,952
Sargent	1,325	66.12%	675	33.68%	4	0.20%	650	32.44%	2,004
Sheridan	631	84.81%	107	14.38%	6	0.81%	524	70.43%	744
Sioux	311	32.98%	630	66.81%	2	0.21%	-319	-33.83%	943
Slope	345	89.15%	39	10.08%	3	0.78%	306	79.07%	387
Stark	12,132	82.83%	2,431	16.60%	83	0.57%	9,701	66.24%	14,646
Steele	636	63.66%	361	36.14%	2	0.20%	275	27.53%	999
Stutsman	7,056	72.66%	2,633	27.11%	22	0.23%	4,423	45.55%	9,711
Towner	795	72.21%	303	27.52%	3	0.27%	492	44.69%	1,101
Traill	2,710	67.15%	1,316	32.61%	10	0.25%	1,394	34.54%	4,036
Walsh	3,266	73.34%	1,176	26.41%	11	0.25%	2,090	46.93%	4,453
Ward	20,457	73.35%	7,282	26.11%	150	0.54%	13,175	47.24%	27,889
Wells	1,746	79.08%	439	19.88%	23	1.04%	1,307	59.19%	2,208
Williams	12,185	83.65%	2,305	15.82%	77	0.53%	9,880	67.82%	14,567
Totals	249,101	69.24%	109,231	30.36%	1,455	0.40%	139,870	38.88%	359,787

Counties that flipped from Independent to Republican

- Cass (largest city: Fargo)

Counties that flipped from Independent to Democratic

- Rolette (largest CDP: Belcourt)
- Sioux (largest CDP: Cannon Ball)

== Notes ==
Partisan clients
