= 2026 North Dakota Public Service Commission election =

- November 3, 2026

2 of 3 seats on the North Dakota Public Service Commission 2 seats needed for a majority
Party	Republican	Democratic–NPL
Current seats	3	0

The 2026 North Dakota Public Service Commission election was held on November 3, 2026, to elect two members to the North Dakota Public Service Commission. The primary election was held on June 9, 2026.

== Haugen-Hoffart's seat ==
=== Republican primary ===
==== Candidates ====
===== Nominee =====
- Sheri Haugen-Hoffart, incumbent commissioner

===== Eliminated in primary =====
- Deven Styczynski, self-employed by High Plains Water

==== Endorsements ====
Declined to endorse

Political parties

- North Dakota Republican Party

=== Results ===
Republican primary results
Party	Candidate	Votes	%
Republican	Sheri Haugen-Hoffart (incumbent)	48,222	64.4
Republican	Deven Styczynski	26,398	35.3
Write-in		211	0.3
Total votes		74,831	100.0

=== Democratic primary ===
==== Candidates ====
===== Nominee =====
- John Pederson, teacher at Mayville State University

==== Endorsements ====
John Pederson

Political parties

- North Dakota Democratic–Nonpartisan League Party

Labor Unions

- North Dakota AFL-CIO

==== Results ====
Democratic–NPL primary results
Party	Candidate	Votes	%
Democratic–NPL	John Pederson	33,991	99.8
Write-in		55	0.2
Total votes		34,046	100.0

== Kringstad's seat (special) ==
=== Republican primary ===
==== Candidates ====
===== Nominee =====
- Jill Kringstad, incumbent commissioner

===== Eliminated in primary =====
- Chris Olson, general foreman

==== Endorsements ====
Declined to endorse

Political parties

- North Dakota Republican Party

=== Results ===
Republican primary results
Party	Candidate	Votes	%
Republican	Jill Kringstad (incumbent)	41,800	54.3
Republican	Chris Olson	35,032	45.5
Write-in		156	0.2
Total votes		76,988	100.0

=== Democratic primary ===
==== Candidates ====
===== Nominee =====
- Scot Kelsh, former state representative from 11th district (1997–2015)

==== Endorsements ====
Scot Kelsh

Political parties

- North Dakota Democratic–Nonpartisan League Party

Labor Unions

- North Dakota AFL-CIO

==== Results ====
Democratic–NPL primary results
Party	Candidate	Votes	%
Democratic–NPL	Scot Kelsh	33,957	99.8
Write-in		57	0.2
Total votes		34,014	100.0
