= Rick Becker =

American physician and politician from North Dakota

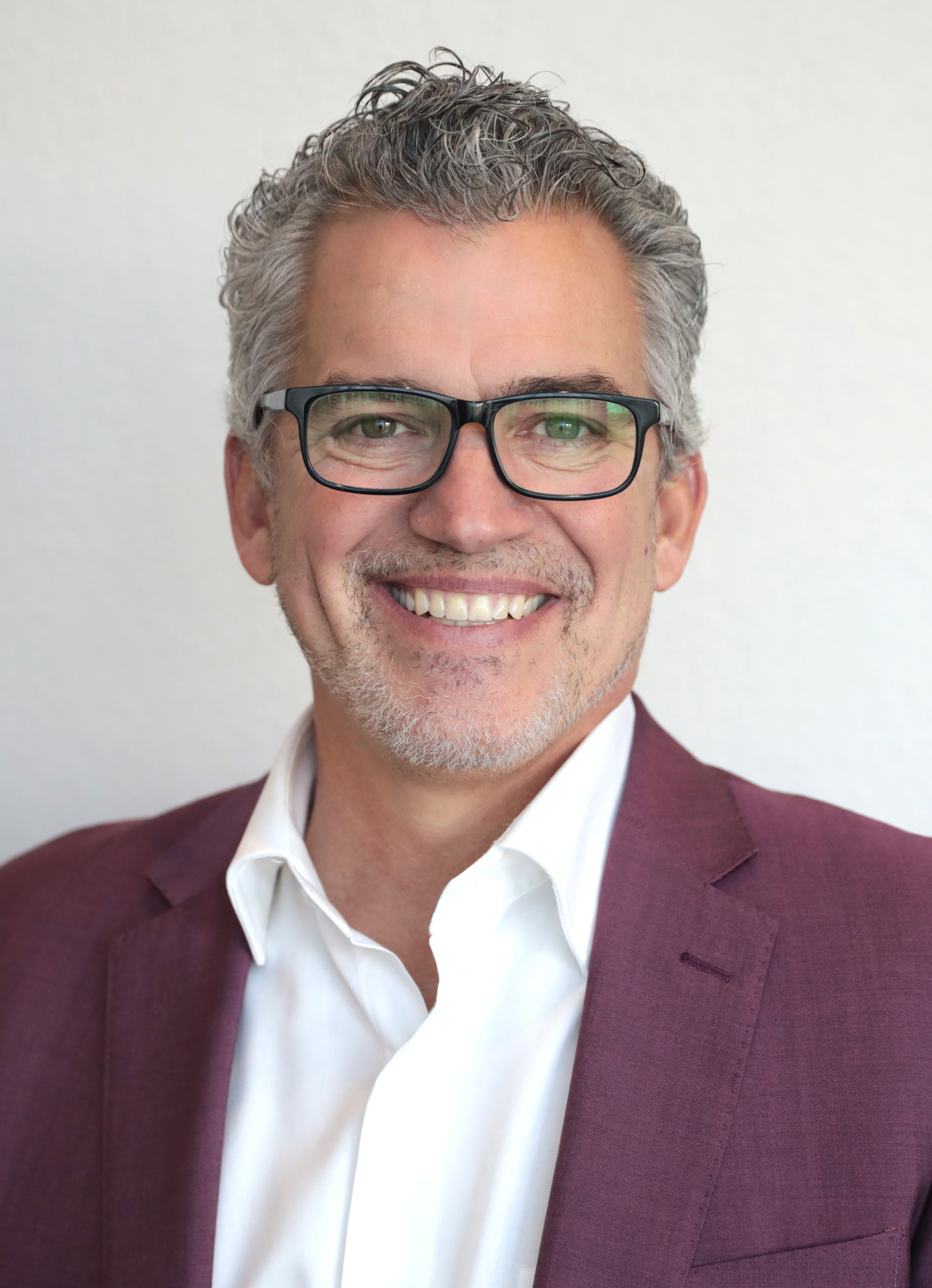
- Becker in 2022

Member of the North Dakota House of Representatives from the 7th district
- In office December 1, 2012 – November 30, 2022
- Preceded by: Jon Nelson
- Succeeded by: Matt Heilman

Personal details
- Born: Mandan, North Dakota
- Party: Republican (before 2022; 2024–present)
- Other political affiliations: Independent (2022–2024)
- Spouse: Anne Becker
- Children: 4
- Education: University of North Dakota (BS, MD)

Ricky Clark Becker is an American businessman and politician from Bismarck. He served in the North Dakota House of Representatives as a Republican from 2012 to 2022.

Becker is a plastic surgeon and businessman with several commercial developments. He was elected to represent District 7 in the North Dakota House in 2012, and was reelected to a four-year term in 2014 and 2018 before retiring in 2022. Becker has often been described as a proponent of far-right politics, and was a founder of the ultraconservative Bastiat Caucus. Becker has also held a position on the Bismarck Planning and Zoning Commission.

He was a candidate for Governor of North Dakota in the 2016 gubernatorial election. He considered running in the run for the US Senate against incumbent Heidi Heitkamp, but ultimately decided against a run. Becker was an independent candidate in the 2022 United States Senate election in North Dakota, after unsuccessfully challenging incumbent John Hoeven in the Republican primary, garnering 46% of the vote at the GOP convention. He placed third in the general election, having received 18.5% of the vote. Becker then ran for North Dakota's at-large congressional district in 2024 following the announcement that incumbent Kelly Armstrong will run for governor. Becker lost the primary to eventual winner Julie Fedorchak. He then ran in 2026 to return to the North Dakota House, but came in third in the primary.

== Political views ==
Becker is often described as a conservative or libertarian. He has described himself as "...many things: a classical liberal, libertarian, fiscal conservative, laissez-faire capitalist. There are many things that you can refer to me as." Becker has voluntarily requested officials to rescind certain benefits and tax breaks his businesses are eligible for because he doesn't agree with them. In an interview, Becker stated, "I'm a very vocal opponent to most government incentive programs. I'm very much a believer in the free market." In 2017, he said that North Dakota has too many colleges, saying the state board of higher education should look into "re-purposing some of the campuses." As of 2022, he has been described as ultraconservative by many. He responded to this by stating, "someone who simply stands for the platform of the conservative party... are conservative."

== North Dakota House of Representatives ==
During his first session in 2013, Becker formed the ultraconservative Bastiat Caucus, named after the political philosopher Frédéric Bastiat. Eventually, the group grew to several dozen members of the North Dakota House, often holding regular meetings to organize a unified, conservative front on key votes.

During the 2015 legislative session, Becker supported Division A of HB 1461, which would have pulled North Dakota out of the Smarter Balanced Assessment Consortium, generally seen as a move to get the state out of the Common Core standards. The bill narrowly failed. Becker was the main force courting support for the bill, which Governor Jack Dalrymple, state Superintendent of Public Instruction Kirsten Baesler, and Republican Party leadership opposed.

Becker supported a bill that would have brought the state income tax down to a 0% rate for an extended tax holiday for residents paying those taxes. His bill to ban DUI checkpoints garnered significant controversy but ultimately failed.

In 2017, Becker and others decided to provide a more organized, public presence for their Bastiat Caucus in order to disseminate information to the public about key legislation from Caucus members. This effort included an aggressive social media campaign, website and grassroots organizing headed by his former gubernatorial campaign staff. Some in the media reported division amongst the ranks of the Republican Party and efforts by leadership to thwart Becker's legislative initiatives.

Becker introduced 17 bills during the 2017 legislative session, more than most representatives. His "constitutional carry" bill, which would allow otherwise law-abiding citizens to carry concealed weapons without a permit generated significant interest and attention. He also introduced legislation on free speech protections on college campuses that would eliminate "safe spaces" and a bill decriminalizing marijuana. In the aftermath of the 2015 legislative battle over getting out of Common Core in North Dakota and an electoral challenge to Superintendent of Public Instruction, Kirsten Baesler, Becker decided to put forward legislation to provide school choice in North Dakota. His bill, which would establish education savings accounts, was introduced.

== 2016 gubernatorial campaign ==
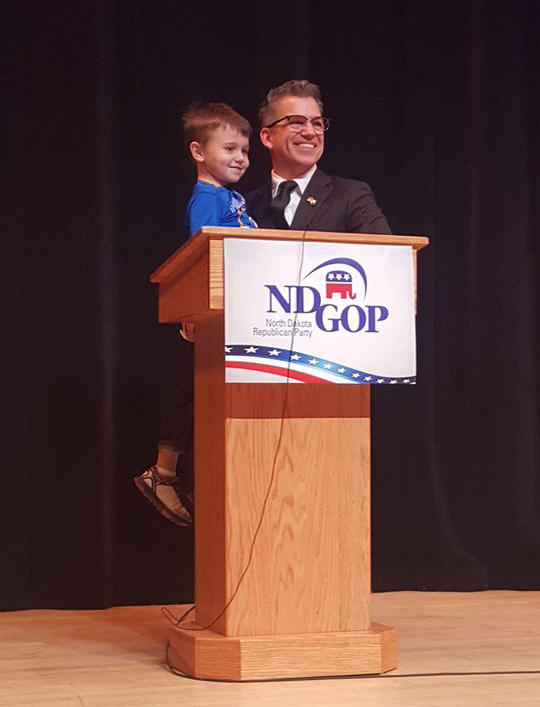
Rick Becker on stage with his grandson at the March 3, 2016, gubernatorial debate in Bismarck, North Dakota.

On November 11, 2015, in an online video announcement, Becker became the first candidate to announce his candidacy in the 2016 gubernatorial election. The campaign sought the endorsement of the Republican Party at its state convention, held in Fargo in April 2016. He publicly pledged to not proceed past the convention without support from the Party. Becker was endorsed by many of the top conservatives in the legislature, including Majority Caucus Leader Scott Louser. He was also endorsed by the National Association for Gun Rights and by Congressman and former presidential candidate Ron Paul.

At the State Republican Convention, Becker came in second to Attorney General Wayne Stenehjem on a first and second ballot. Eventually, Stenehjem won in a close race over Becker. Doug Burgum, who came in a distant third at the convention, eventually defeated Stenehjem in the June 14 Republican primary.

== 2022 U.S. Senate campaign ==
On January 19, 2022, Becker announced he would not run for reelection to the North Dakota House of Representatives. On February 6, he announced he would primary incumbent U.S. Senator John Hoeven in the 2022 election. Becker was defeated by Hoeven at the GOP convention on April 2, by a vote of 1,224 (54%) to 1,037 (46%). Although Becker pledged at the convention to honor their decision, he subsequently changed his mind and re-entered the race as a conservative Independent candidate in August.

== 2024 congressional campaign ==
Becker announced that he would campaign as a Republican for North Dakota's at-large congressional district on January 22, 2024. At that time, incumbent Representative Kelly Armstrong was expected to run for re-election. The following day, Armstrong announced he would not seek re-election and would instead run for governor. Becker faced public service commissioner Julie Fedorchak, former Miss America Cara Mund, farmer Alex Balazs, and activist Sharlet Mohr.

During the North Dakota Republican Party endorsement convention, Becker encouraged his supporters to write in spoiler ballots to prevent an endorsement from going through, as he was ineligible to receive the endorsement due to a rule change about keeping party membership for a certain amount of years in response to his independent senate campaign. After two failed ballots, Julie Fedorchak withdrew from the endorsement to allow the convention to continue, giving Alex Balazs the endorsement.

Becker received the endorsement of the majority of the House Freedom Caucus, Vivek Ramaswamy, and senator Rand Paul among others.

Becker lost the primary, coming in second place to Julie Fedorchak with 29% of the vote.

Becker also headed a constitutional ballot initiative, Measure #4, that would've eliminated local property taxes. The measure faced harsh opposition, and would fail on election night.

== 2026 North Dakota House campaign ==
On December 1, 2025, Becker announced a campaign to return to the North Dakota House of Representatives. He ran in a packed primary for his old house seat against numerous individuals.

Despite receiving district party endorsement, Becker failed to return to the legislature and came in third in the primary.

== Electoral history ==
- 2012 Race for North Dakota's House of Representatives – District 07

Voters to choose two:

Name	Votes	Percent	Outcome
Jason D. Dockter, (R).	4,374	33.2%	Won
Rick Becker, (R).	4,291	32.6%	Won
Tom Kelsh, (D).	2,351	17.8%	Lost
Warren D. Larson, (D).	2,143	16.4%	Lost

- 2014 Race for North Dakota's House of Representatives – District 07

Voters to choose two:

Name	Votes	Percent	Outcome
Jason D. Dockter, (R).	4,624	49.6%	Won
Rick Becker, (R).	4,569	49.0%	Won
Write-ins	125	1.%	Lost

2016 North Dakota Republican State Convention

- First Convention Ballot

Delegates to choose one, all candidates remain on ballot after first round, starting third round of voting, lowest vote-getter would be removed, first candidate to receive 50%+1 wins:

Name	Votes	Percent	Outcome
Wayne Stenehjem	769	48.0	proceeded to 2nd ballot
Rick Becker	587	36.6%	proceeded to 2nd ballot
Doug Burgum	247	15.4%	proceeded to 2nd ballot

- Second Convention Ballot

Name	Votes	Percent	Outcome
Wayne Stenehjem	823	51.5%	received NDGOP endorsement
Rick Becker	618	38.7%	withdrew
Doug Burgum	157	9.8%	proceeded to Republican primary ballot

2022 United States Senate election in North Dakota
Party	Candidate	Votes	%	±%
Republican	John Hoeven (incumbent)	135,474	56.41%	−22.07%
Democratic–NPL	Katrina Christiansen	59,995	24.98%	+8.01%
Independent	Rick Becker	44,406	18.49%	N/A
Write-in		265	0.11%	N/A
Total votes		240,140	100.0%	
Republican hold				

2024 Republican congressional primary results
Party	Candidate	Votes	%
Republican	Julie Fedorchak	43,424	45.9
Republican	Rick Becker	27,965	29.6
Republican	Cara Mund	18,460	19.5
Republican	Alex Balazs	3,788	4.0
Republican	Sharlet Mohr	800	0.8
Write-in		109	0.1
Total votes		94,546	100.0

2026 North Dakota House of Representatives District 7 Republican primary 2 to be nominated
Party	Candidate	Votes	%
Republican	Greg Vetter	1,608	31.41
Republican	Steve Sauter	1,433	27.99
Republican	Rick Becker	1,151	22.48
Republican	Gaylynn Becker	915	17.87
Write-in		12	0.23
Total votes		5,119	100.00
