= Susan Wefald =

American politician (born 1947)

North Dakota Public Service Commissioner
- In office January 1, 1993 – January 1, 2009
- Preceded by: Dale V. Sandstrom
- Succeeded by: Brian Kalk

Personal details
- Born: June 30, 1947 (age 79) Michigan
- Party: Republican
- Education: University of Michigan

Susan Wefald (born June 30, 1947) is a former North Dakota Republican Party politician. She served as a North Dakota Public Service Commissioner from 1993 until her retirement in 2009.

== Biography ==
Susan Wefald was born in Royal Oak, Michigan and received her bachelor's degree from the University of Michigan and her Master of Public Administration degree from the University of North Dakota. She is a licensed social worker, and a former credit counselor. She was a member of the Bismarck Public Schools board from 1989 to 1993, and she has been on the Veterans Memorial Library Board of Trustees since 2001. She was appointed to the Public Service Commission in 1993 by Governor Ed Schafer to complete the term by Dale V. Sandstrom, who resigned. She is the first woman to serve on the state's Public Service Commission. In 2002, Wefald was re-elected to serve a six-year term with the Commission. Wefald did not seek re-election in 2008. At the time of her retirement, she was serving as the President of the Commission. She is the wife of Robert O. Wefald, and they have three grown children; Sarah, Kathryn and Tom. She currently has two grandchildren named Andrew and Grace.

Preceded by Dale V. Sandstrom	North Dakota Public Service Commissioner; 1993–2009	Succeeded by Brian Kalk
