= Brian Kalk =

American politician

Eighth President of Bismarck State College
- Incumbent
- Assumed office April 16, 2026
- Preceded by: Dan Leingang (interim)

North Dakota Public Service Commissioner
- In office January 2009 – January 2017
- Governor: John Hoeven; Jack Dalrymple; Doug Burgum
- Preceded by: Susan Wefald
- Succeeded by: Brian Kroshus

Personal details
- Born: Bottineau, North Dakota
- Party: Republican
- Education: Campbell University, North Dakota State University

Military service
- Branch/service: United States Marine Corps
- Rank: Major

Brian Kalk (born c. 1966) is a former North Dakota politician and president of Bismarck State College. He served on the North Dakota Public Service Commission from 2009 to 2017.

== Early life ==
Kalk was born and raised in Bottineau, North Dakota and graduated from Bottineau High School in 1984. He was class President in Bottineau his Freshman and Senior years of high school. While in High School he was active in the FFA, Hockey, Football, Track, and Choir. Kalk graduated in the top 10% of his class. Following High School graduation he attended Dakota College at Bottineau where he played hockey for the "Lumber Jacks" and studied Political Science and Natural Resources until his enlistment in the Marine Corps in 1987.

== Marines ==
Kalk served as a Marine from 1987 until his retirement. During his years as a Marine, he traveled to over forty countries. Kalk served in many operations including Operation Enduring Freedom, and Operation Iraqi Freedom. While serving, he received his bachelor's degree in political science from Campbell University in North Carolina. In 2003, Kalk deployed as the Forward Operations Officer for Transportation Support Group One. In 2003, he returned to North Dakota to command the Fargo Military Entrance Processing Station. While in Fargo, he received his Doctorate Degree from North Dakota State University in Natural Resource Management. He then taught different courses at NDSU.

== Politics ==
In January 2008, Kalk announced his campaign for the Republican nomination for the Public Service Commission. He won in the general election and has focused on job creation utilizing the state's natural resources. Kalk was re-elected in 2014. Kalk resigned in January 2017 to accept a position at the Energy and Environmental Research Center until April 2019 when Kalk was named the executive director of the North Dakota State University Research and Technology Park until he returned to the Energy and Environmental Research Center as the Chief Research Officer in June 2022. Kalk was appointed the eighth president of Bismarck State College on April 16, 2026.

== Personal life ==
Kalk and his wife Karen have a daughter. He is active in organizations such as the American Legion, the Marine Corps League, the Veterans of Foreign Wars, and the American Veterans.
