= 2026 North Dakota Tax Commissioner election =

- November 3, 2026
Nominee	Brian Kroshus	Mark Nelson
Party	Republican	Democratic–NPL
Popular vote	145,638	82,424
Percentage	63.8%	36.1%
Tax Commissioner before election
Brian Kroshus
Republican
Elected Tax Commissioner
Brian Kroshus
Republican

An election was held U.S. State of North Dakota on November 3, 2026 to elect the North Dakota Tax Commissioner to a four-year term. A partisan primary election was held on June 9, 2026.

Incumbent Republican tax commissioner Brian Kroshus was elected for his second full term; defeating Democratic-NPL challenger Mark Nelson. Primaries for both parties were uncontested aside from write-in votes.

Prior to this election, Kroshus was elected to his first full term in 2022 with only write-in opposition, receiving 98% of the vote in the general election. He was originally appointed in 2021 by Governor Doug Burgum.

== Republican primary ==
=== Nominee ===
- Brian Kroshus, incumbent tax commissioner

=== Endorsements ===
Declined to endorse

Political parties

- North Dakota Republican Party

=== Results ===
Republican primary results
Party	Candidate	Votes	%
Republican	Brian Kroshus (incumbent)	73,800	99.6
Write-in		312	0.4
Total votes		74,112	100.0

== Democratic primary ==
=== Nominee ===
- Mark Nelson, teacher and nominee for state senate in the 14th district in 2024

=== Endorsements ===
Mark Nelson

Political parties

- North Dakota Democratic–Nonpartisan League Party

=== Results ===
Democratic–NPL primary results
Party	Candidate	Votes	%
Democratic–NPL	Mark Nelson	33,971	99.8
Write-in		70	0.2
Total votes		34,041	100.0
