= Senator Berry =

Senator Berry may refer to:

== Members of the United States Senate ==
- George L. Berry (1882–1948), U.S. Senator from Tennessee from 1937 to 1938
- James Henderson Berry (1841–1913), U.S. Senator from Arkansas from 1885 to 1907

== United States state senate members ==
- Albert S. Berry (1836–1908), Kentucky State Senate
- Andy Berry (fl. 2020s), Mississippi State Senate
- Cabell R. Berry (1848–1910), Tennessee State Senate
- Charles H. Berry (1823–1900), Minnesota State Senate
- E. Y. Berry (1902–1999), South Dakota State Senate
- Fred Berry (politician) (1949–2018), Massachusetts State Senate
- John G. Berry (1838–1923), Michigan State Senate
- John M. Berry (Kentucky politician) (1935–2016), Kentucky State Senate
- John M. Berry (Minnesota politician) (1827–1887), Minnesota State Senate
- Kenneth F. Berry (1916–2003), Ohio State Senate
- Louise Berry (1927–2022), Connecticut State Senate
- Nancy Turbak Berry (born 1956), South Dakota State Senate
- Nathaniel S. Berry (1796–1894), New Hampshire State Senate
- Orville F. Berry (1852–1921), Illinois State Senate
- Red Berry (Texas politician) (1899–1969), Texas State Senate
- Richard N. Berry (1915–2018), Maine State Senate
- Spencer Berry (born 1957), North Dakota State Senate
- Swift Berry (1887–1967), California State Senate

== Others ==
- Lorraine Berry (1949–2010), Senate of the U.S. Virgin Islands
