= Timothy Brown (North Dakota politician) =

American politician

Member of the North Dakota House of Representatives from the 27th district
- Incumbent
- Assumed office March 12, 2025
- Preceded by: Josh Christy
- Succeeded by: Shawn Kessel (elect)

Personal details
- Party: Republican

Timothy (TJ) Brown is an American politician serving as a member of the North Dakota House of Representatives from the 27th district. A Republican, he was appointed to succeed Josh Christy. He is the owner of a virtual shooting range in Fargo.
