= Jonathan Casper =

American politician

Member of the North Dakota Senate from the 27 district
- In office December 1, 2014 – December 1, 2018
- Preceded by: Spencer Berry
- Succeeded by: Kristin Roers

Personal details
- Party: Republican
- Education: Saint John’s University (BA); Creighton University School of Law (JD)

Jonathan Casper is an American attorney and politician from the state of North Dakota. A member of the Republican Party, he represented the 27th district in the North Dakota Senate from 2014 to 2018.

== Political career ==
Casper was elected to the North Dakota Senate in 2014. He served on the Judiciary and Transportation committees, as well as the Industry, Business and Labor committee. He chose not to run for re-election in 2018.

Casper considered running for U.S. House in the 2024 election after incumbent Kelly Armstrong announced he would run for governor. However, Casper ultimately decided against joining the race, saying: "I know we only have one vote in the House and how important that is to the state Kelly has been great and I look forward to working to elect a serious, experienced leader to represent us in Washington."

== Personal life ==
Casper lives in Fargo.
