= 2024 North Dakota gubernatorial election =

- November 5, 2024
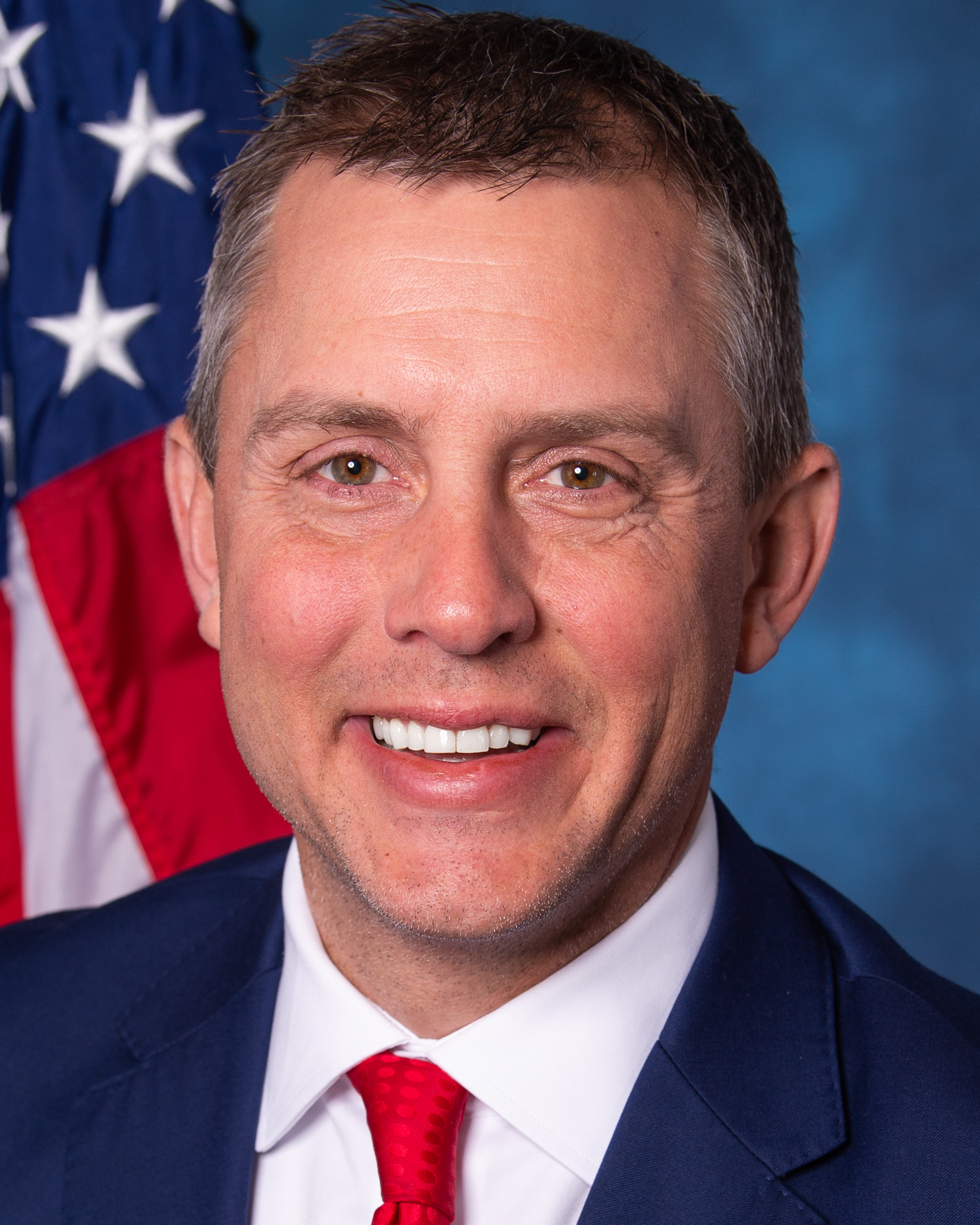

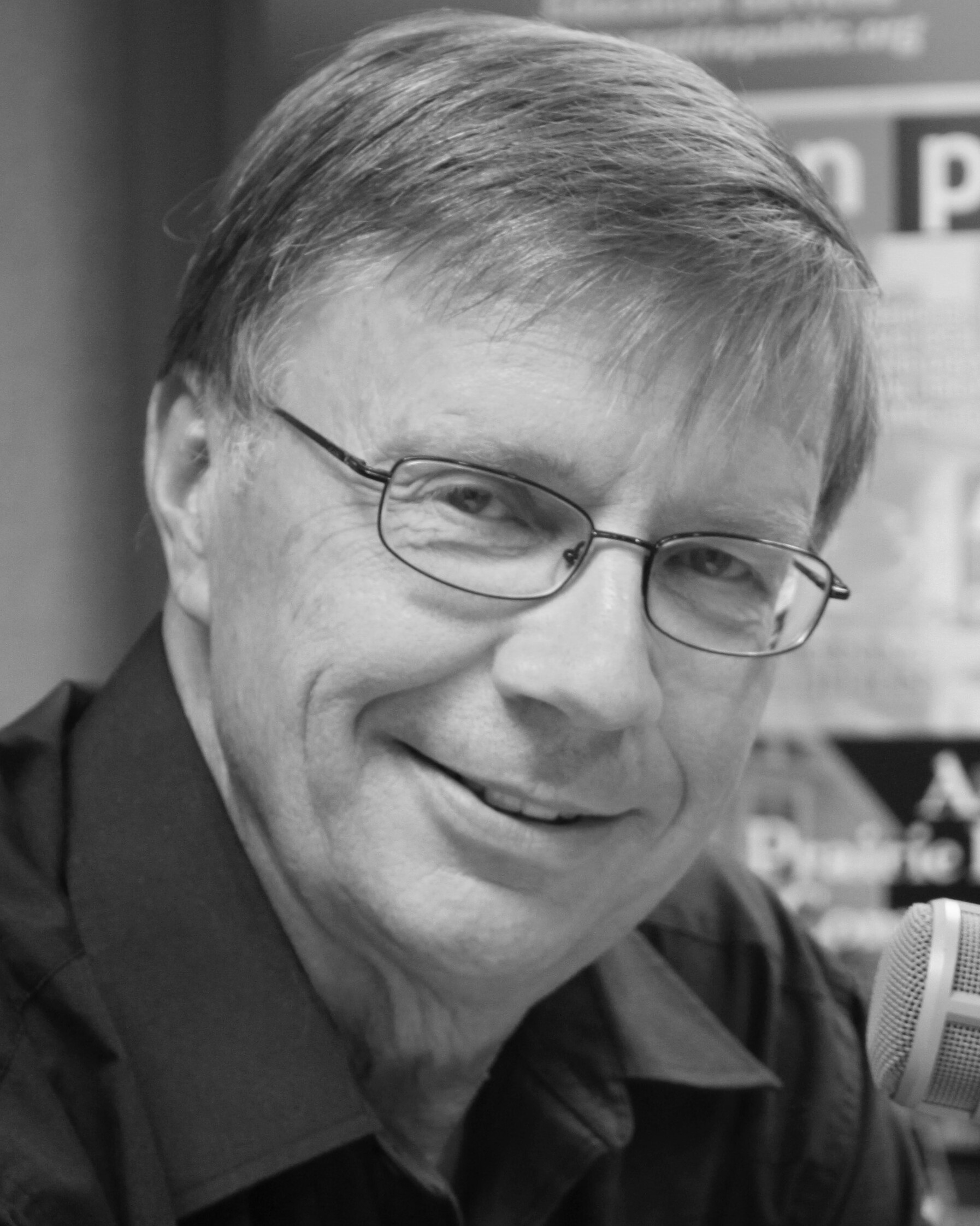

Nominee	Kelly Armstrong	Merrill Piepkorn	Michael Coachman
Party	Republican	Democratic–NPL	Independent
Running mate	Michelle Strinden	Patrick Hart	Lydia Gessele
Popular vote	247,056	94,043	20,322
Percentage	68.26%	25.98%	5.61%
- Armstrong: 40–50% 50–60% 60–70% 70–80% 80–90% >90% Piepkorn: 40–50% 50–60% 60–70% 70–80% No votes
Governor before election
Doug Burgum
Republican
Elected Governor
Kelly Armstrong
Republican

The 2024 North Dakota gubernatorial election was held on November 5, 2024, to elect the governor of North Dakota. Incumbent Republican governor Doug Burgum decided to not seek a third term and ran for president. North Dakota is a Republican stronghold, and the Democratic–Nonpartisan League (NPL) Party has not won a gubernatorial race in the state since 1988.

The Republican nominee, U.S. representative Kelly Armstrong, was elected to his first term, defeating the Democratic–NPL nominee, state senator Merrill Piepkorn in a landslide. Armstrong was sworn in to office in December 2024, succeeding Burgum, who was subsequently appointed Secretary of the Interior by Donald Trump following Trump's victory in the 2024 presidential election.

== Background ==
In November 2022, voters in the state approved a constitutional amendment limiting governors to two four-year terms, but it only applies to individuals elected after January 1, 2023, so incumbent governor Doug Burgum was still eligible to run for re-election under a grandfather clause. On June 7, 2023, Burgum announced that he would instead run for the Republican nomination for president of the United States in 2024, a race he dropped out of on December 4, 2023. Despite considering running for a third term after the end of his presidential campaign, Burgum announced he would not run for a third term on January 22, 2024.

Before Burgum's announcement, former state Senator and former congressional candidate Tom Campbell suggested at and considered a gubernatorial run, despite whatever choice Burgum made. After the decision from Burgum to not seek re-election, Campbell entered the race.

On January 23, the day after Burgum's announcement, U.S. Representative Kelly Armstrong announced he would also seek the governorship, receiving far more reporting than Campbell and an endorsement from Secretary of State Michael Howe. Following Armstrong's announcement, Campbell withdrew and switched his campaign towards the House seat left open by Armstrong.

On January 31, Travis Hipsher, a security guard from Neche, announced he would seek the governorship for the Democratic-NPL. Hipsher described himself as a centrist.

Later on February 6, perennial candidate Michael Coachman announced an independent run for governor. Coachman previously ran for governor in 2020, Lieutenant Governor in 2016 and 2012, and with Secretary of State in 2018.

On February 15, Lieutenant Governor Tammy Miller announced her candidacy to replace Burgum.

Later on March 22, it was reported that state senator Merrill Piepkorn had filed the paperwork to run, but did not announce any campaign. On March 31, Travis Hipsher ended his campaign, making way for Piepkorn's announcement on April 2.

== Republican primary ==
=== Candidates ===
==== Nominee ====
- Kelly Armstrong, U.S. Representative from North Dakota's at-large congressional district (2019–2024)
  - Running Mate: Michelle Strinden, state representative for the 41st district (2019–2024)

==== Eliminated in primary ====
- Tammy Miller, Lieutenant Governor of North Dakota (2023–2024)
  - Running Mate: Josh Teigen, commissioner of the North Dakota Department of Commerce (2022–2024)

==== Withdrawn ====
- Tom Campbell, former state senator from the 19th district (2012–2018) and candidate for North Dakota's at-large congressional district in 2018 (ran for U.S. House)

==== Declined ====
- Kirsten Baesler, North Dakota Superintendent of Public Instruction (2013–2025) (ran for re-election)
- Thomas Beadle, North Dakota State Treasurer (2021–present) (ran for re-election)
- Doug Burgum, Governor of North Dakota (2016–2024) (endorsed Miller)
- Kevin Cramer, U.S. Senator (2018–present) (endorsed Armstrong, ran for re-election)
- Julie Fedorchak, member of the North Dakota Public Service Commission (2012–2025) (ran for U.S. House)
- Michael Howe, North Dakota Secretary of State (2023–present) (endorsed Armstrong)
- Drew Wrigley, North Dakota Attorney General (2022–present)

=== Endorsements ===
Kelly Armstrong

Federal officials

- Donald Trump, former President of the United States (2017–2021)

U.S. Senators

- Kevin Cramer, U.S. Senator for North Dakota (2019–present)and former U.S. Representative for North Dakota's at-large congressional district
- John Hoeven, U.S. Senator for North Dakota (2011–present) and former governor (2000–2010)

Statewide officials

- Michael Howe, North Dakota Secretary of State (2023–present)

Organizations

- North Dakota Republican Party
Tammy Miller

Statewide officials

- Doug Burgum, Governor of North Dakota (2016–2024)

=== Debates ===
Prairie Public Broadcasting hosted a debate between Armstrong and Miller on April 23. On May 2, it was announced that the Fargo-Moorhead-West Fargo Chamber of Commerce would hold a live, in person debate on May 30. A third debate was held on June 7.

2024 North Dakota gubernatorial election Republican primary debate
No.	Date	Host	Moderator	Link	Republican	Republican
Key: P Participant A Absent N Not invited I Invited W Withdrawn						
Key: P Participant A Absent N Not invited I Invited W Withdrawn					Kelly Armstrong	Tammy Miller
1	April 23, 2024	Prairie Public Broadcasting	Dave Thompson	YouTube	P	P
2	May 30, 2024	FMWF Chamber of Commerce			P	P

=== Polling ===
Poll source	Date(s) administered	Sample size (Note: Key: A – all adults RV – registered voters LV – likely voters V – unclear)	Margin of error	Kelly Armstrong	Tammy Miller	Undecided
WPA Intelligence (Note: This poll was sponsored by the North Dakota News Cooperative)	May 20–22, 2024	500 (LV)	± 4.4%	57%	19%	24%
DFM Research (D) (Note: This poll was sponsored by North Dakota United, a union for teachers and public sector workers)	May 6–8, 2024	400 (LV)	± 4.9%	56%	18%	26%
Guidant Polling and Strategy (Note: This poll was sponsored by Armstrong's campaign)	May 4−8, 2024	500 (LV)	± 4.4%	60%	19%	19%

=== Results ===
Primary results by county Armstrong: 50–60%; 60–70%; 70–80%; 80–90%; Miller: 50–60%

Republican primary results
Party	Candidate	Votes	%
Republican	Kelly Armstrong Michelle Strinden	67,704	73.2%
Republican	Tammy Miller Josh Teigen	24,784	26.8%
Total votes		92,488	100.0%

== Democratic-NPL Primary ==
=== Candidates ===
==== Nominee ====
- Merrill Piepkorn, state senator for the 44th district (2016–2024)
  - Running mate: Patrick Hart, treasurer of the North Dakota Democratic-Nonpartisan League Party and nominee for state auditor in 2020

==== Withdrawn ====
- Travis Hipsher, security guard

=== Endorsements ===
Merrill Piepkorn

Organizations

- North Dakota Democratic-Nonpartisan League Party

=== Results ===
Democratic–NPL primary results
Party	Candidate	Votes	%
Democratic–NPL	Merrill Piepkorn Patrick Hart	19,609	100.0%
Total votes		19,609	100.0%

== Independent ==
=== Candidates ===
==== Declared ====
- Michael Coachman, former Larimore city councilor and perennial candidate
  - Running mate: Lydia Gessele, stay-at-home mom

== General election ==
=== Predictions ===
Source	Ranking	As of
The Cook Political Report	Solid R	June 13, 2024
Inside Elections	Solid R	July 14, 2023
Sabato's Crystal Ball	Safe R	June 4, 2024
RCP	Solid R	July 13, 2024
Elections Daily	Safe R	July 12, 2023
CNalysis	Solid R	August 17, 2024

=== Post-primary endorsements ===
Kelly Armstrong (R)

Statewide officials

- Tammy Miller, North Dakota Lieutenant Governor (2023–2024)
Merrill Piepkorn

Statewide officials

- Tim Walz, Governor of Minnesota (2019-Present), 2024 Democratic Vice Presidential Nominee, and Chair of the Democratic Governors Association (2023-2024)

=== Debates ===
2024 North Dakota Gubernatorial debate
No.	Date	Host	Moderator	Link	Democratic-NPL	Republican	Independent
Key: P Participant A Absent N Not invited I Invited W Withdrawn							
Key: P Participant A Absent N Not invited I Invited W Withdrawn					Merrill Piepkorn	Kelly Armstrong	Michael Coachman
1	September 6, 2024	Forum Communications	Rob Port	Podcasts	P	P	N
2	October 8, 2024	KFGO News	Paul Jurgens, Amy Dalrymple, and Jim Shaw	Omny	P	P	N
3	October 10, 2024	Prairie Public Broadcasting	Dave Thompson	C-SPAN	P	P	P
4	October 14, 2024	BEK TV	Joel Heitkamp and Steve Bakken	C-SPAN	P	P	P

=== Polling ===
Poll source	Date(s) administered	Sample size	Margin of error	Kelly Armstrong (R)	Merrill Piepkorn (D)	Michael Coachman (I)	Undecided
WPA Intelligence	September 28–30, 2024	500 (LV)	± 4.4%	54%	24%	3%	19%
Public Opinion Strategies (Note: Poll sponsored by Brighter Future Alliance)	June 15–19, 2024	500 (LV)	± 4.38%	61%	22%	11%	6%

=== Results ===
2024 North Dakota gubernatorial election
Party	Candidate	Votes	%	±%
Republican	Kelly Armstrong Michelle Strinden	247,056	68.26%	+2.42%
Democratic–NPL	Merrill Piepkorn Patrick Hart	94,043	25.98%	+0.60%
Independent	Michael Coachman Lydia Gessele	20,322	5.61%	N/A
Write-in		530	0.15%	-4.75%
Total votes		361,951	100.00%	N/A
Republican hold				

==== By county ====
County	Kelly Armstrong Republican		Merrill Piepkorn Democratic–NPL		Michael Coachman Independent		Write-in Various		Margin		Total votes
County	#	%	#	%	#	%	#	%	#	%	Total votes
Adams	978	81.91%	162	13.57%	53	4.44%	1	0.08%	816	68.34%	1,194
Barnes	3,655	69.17%	1,417	26.82%	205	3.88%	7	0.13%	2,238	42.35%	5,284
Benson	1,135	58.57%	697	35.96%	103	5.31%	3	0.15%	438	22.60%	1,938
Billings	526	80.92%	85	13.08%	39	6.00%	0	0.00%	441	67.85%	650
Bottineau	2,585	75.45%	622	18.16%	216	6.30%	3	0.09%	1,963	57.30%	3,426
Bowman	1,387	85.72%	171	10.57%	60	3.71%	0	0.00%	1,216	75.15%	1,618
Burke	874	83.64%	115	11.00%	56	5.36%	0	0.00%	759	72.63%	1,045
Burleigh	36,496	70.96%	11,343	22.05%	3,492	6.79%	100	0.19%	25,153	48.91%	51,431
Cass	50,505	56.43%	34,903	39.00%	3,953	4.42%	140	0.16%	15,602	17.43%	89,501
Cavalier	1,491	75.61%	401	20.33%	78	3.96%	2	0.10%	1,090	55.27%	1,972
Dickey	1,802	74.56%	491	20.31%	123	5.09%	1	0.04%	1,311	54.24%	2,417
Divide	894	75.32%	226	19.04%	67	5.64%	0	0.00%	668	56.28%	1,187
Dunn	1,806	81.46%	276	12.45%	131	5.91%	4	0.18%	1,530	69.01%	2,217
Eddy	856	71.04%	280	23.24%	68	5.64%	1	0.08%	576	47.80%	1,205
Emmons	1,582	83.35%	183	9.64%	130	6.85%	3	0.16%	1,399	73.71%	1,898
Foster	1,330	78.61%	291	17.20%	71	4.20%	0	0.00%	1,039	61.41%	1,692
Golden Valley	825	84.53%	101	10.35%	50	5.12%	0	0.00%	724	74.18%	976
Grand Forks	19,016	62.03%	10,153	33.12%	1,455	4.75%	32	0.10%	8,863	28.91%	30,656
Grant	1,045	80.14%	165	12.65%	91	6.98%	3	0.23%	880	67.48%	1,304
Griggs	977	76.51%	259	20.28%	41	3.21%	0	0.00%	718	56.23%	1,277
Hettinger	1,057	82.64%	138	10.79%	84	6.57%	0	0.00%	919	71.85%	1,279
Kidder	1,085	78.74%	188	13.64%	105	7.62%	0	0.00%	897	65.09%	1,378
LaMoure	1,619	76.51%	393	18.57%	103	4.87%	1	0.05%	1,226	57.94%	2,116
Logan	855	83.09%	107	10.40%	64	6.22%	3	0.29%	748	72.69%	1,029
McHenry	2,102	77.08%	435	15.95%	184	6.75%	6	0.22%	1,667	61.13%	2,727
McIntosh	1,087	78.77%	229	16.59%	62	4.49%	2	0.14%	858	62.17%	1,380
McKenzie	4,473	82.68%	634	11.72%	290	5.36%	13	0.24%	3,839	70.96%	5,410
McLean	4,094	76.17%	943	17.54%	334	6.21%	4	0.07%	3,151	58.62%	5,375
Mercer	3,625	80.34%	609	13.50%	272	6.03%	6	0.13%	3,016	66.84%	4,512
Morton	12,297	74.00%	3,141	18.90%	1,152	6.93%	27	0.16%	9,156	55.10%	16,617
Mountrail	2,759	68.58%	1,014	25.21%	248	6.16%	2	0.05%	1,745	43.38%	4,023
Nelson	1,159	66.57%	513	29.47%	67	3.85%	2	0.11%	646	37.11%	1,741
Oliver	866	81.09%	132	12.36%	70	6.55%	0	0.00%	734	68.73%	1,068
Pembina	2,387	77.27%	609	19.72%	90	2.91%	3	0.10%	1,778	57.56%	3,089
Pierce	1,477	75.40%	362	18.48%	117	5.97%	3	0.15%	1,115	56.92%	1,959
Ramsey	3,671	70.88%	1,198	23.13%	303	5.85%	7	0.14%	2,473	47.75%	5,179
Ransom	1,699	64.82%	798	30.45%	123	4.69%	1	0.04%	901	34.38%	2,621
Renville	969	80.62%	153	12.73%	80	6.66%	0	0.00%	816	67.89%	1,202
Richland	5,710	69.95%	2,093	25.64%	356	4.36%	4	0.05%	3,617	44.31%	8,163
Rolette	1,548	38.87%	2,244	56.34%	186	4.67%	5	0.13%	-696	-17.47%	3,983
Sargent	1,310	64.92%	604	29.93%	104	5.15%	0	0.00%	706	34.99%	2,018
Sheridan	576	77.21%	94	12.60%	75	10.05%	1	0.13%	482	64.61%	746
Sioux	312	33.12%	545	57.86%	84	8.92%	1	0.11%	-233	-24.73%	942
Slope	340	86.96%	28	7.16%	23	5.88%	0	0.00%	312	79.80%	391
Stark	12,056	81.30%	1,792	12.08%	960	6.47%	21	0.14%	10,264	69.22%	14,829
Steele	627	62.64%	321	32.07%	52	5.19%	1	0.10%	306	30.57%	1,001
Stutsman	7,009	71.88%	2,158	22.13%	574	5.89%	10	0.10%	4,851	49.75%	9,751
Towner	804	72.63%	244	22.04%	58	5.24%	1	0.09%	560	50.59%	1,107
Traill	2,721	66.94%	1,160	28.54%	176	4.33%	8	0.20%	1,561	38.40%	4,065
Walsh	3,305	73.74%	975	21.75%	190	4.24%	12	0.27%	2,330	51.99%	4,482
Ward	20,361	72.69%	5,716	20.41%	1,877	6.70%	56	0.20%	14,645	52.28%	28,010
Wells	1,662	74.76%	330	14.84%	230	10.35%	1	0.04%	1,332	59.92%	2,223
Williams	11,669	79.67%	1,802	12.30%	1,147	7.83%	29	0.20%	9,867	67.37%	14,647
Totals	247,056	68.26%	94,043	25.98%	20,322	5.61%	530	0.15%	153,013	42.27%	361,951

== Notes ==
Partisan clients
