= 2022 United States Senate election in North Dakota =

- November 8, 2022
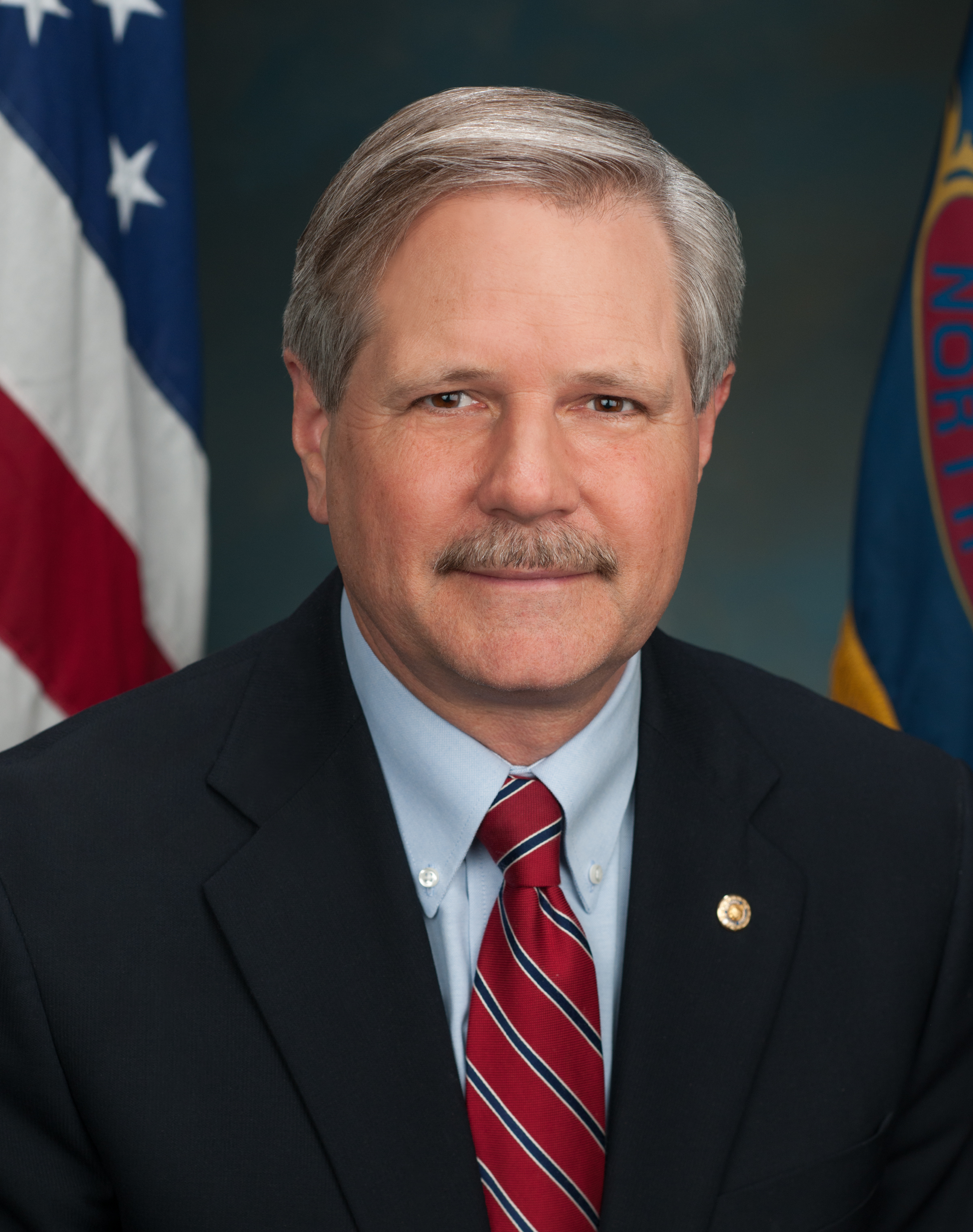

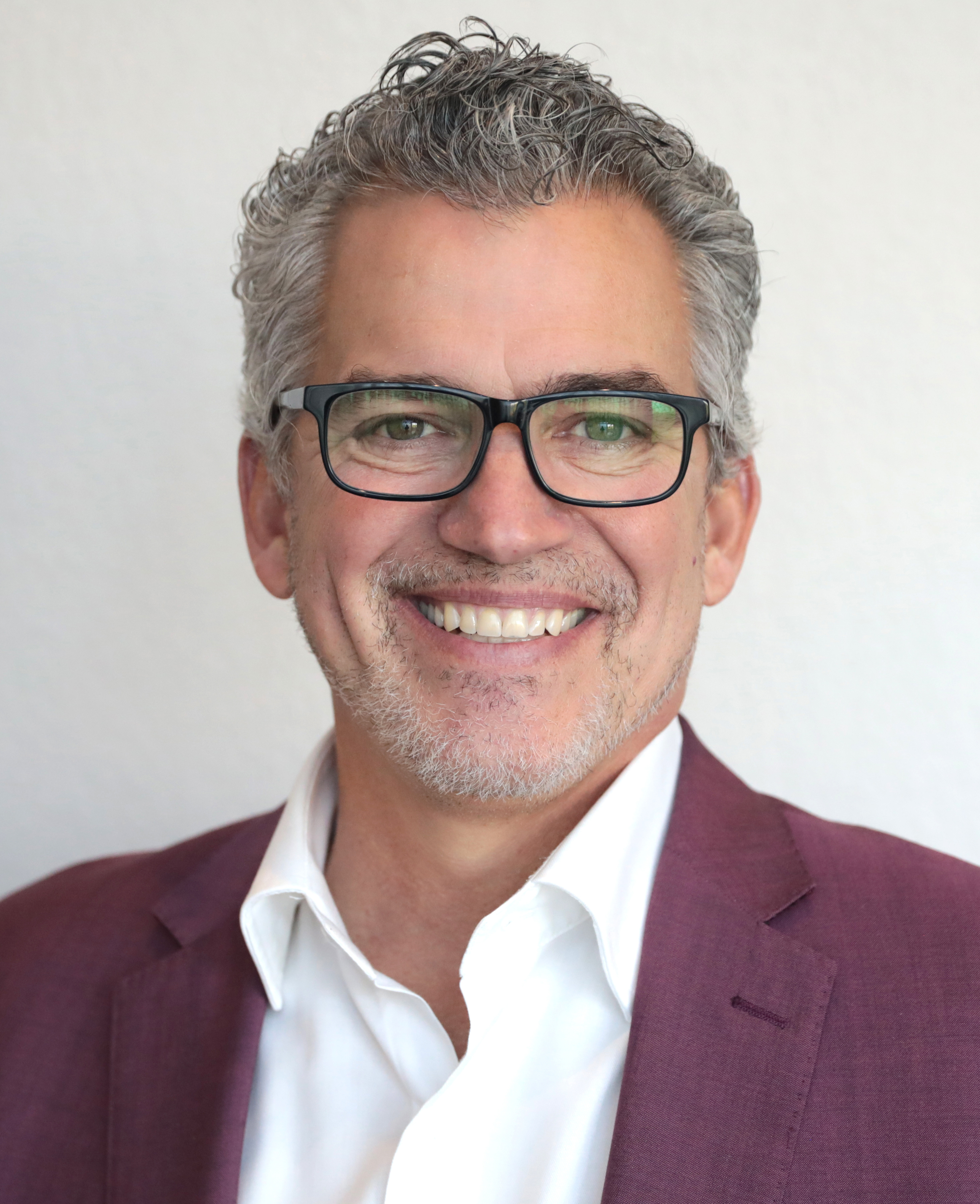
Nominee	John Hoeven	Katrina Christiansen	Rick Becker
Party	Republican	Democratic–NPL	Independent
Popular vote	135,474	59,995	44,406
Percentage	56.41%	24.98%	18.49%
- County results Hoeven: 40–50% 50–60% 60–70% 70–80% Christiansen: 40–50% 50–60%
U.S. senator before election
John Hoeven
Republican
Elected U.S. senator
John Hoeven
Republican

The 2022 United States Senate election in North Dakota was held on November 8, 2022, to elect a member of the United States Senate to represent the state of North Dakota. Incumbent Republican John Hoeven was first elected in 2010 with 76% of the vote to succeed retiring Democratic–NPL incumbent Byron Dorgan, and won re-election in 2016 with 78.5% of the vote. He ran for a re-election to a third term in office against Democratic-NPL nominee Katrina Christiansen. He also faced State Representative Rick Becker, who initially ran as a Republican in the primary, but suspended his campaign in August 2022 and instead ran as an independent.

Hoeven won reelection to a third term in office with 56.4% of the vote. His performance, however, was far less impressive than in both of his prior races and even substantially lower than what most polling had indicated, and was the worst a winning Republican had made in the Class 3 seat since 1974. This underperformance was in part attributed to Becker's candidacy as an Independent, who took 18.5% of the vote. Additionally, Christiansen's 25% vote share was the highest of any Democratic–NPL candidate for the Class 3 Senate seat since Dorgan's landslide 2004 win. Becker later rejoined the Republican Party in January 2024, and Christiansen unsuccessfully ran for North Dakota's other Senate that year against incumbent Kevin Cramer.

== Republican primary ==
=== Candidates ===
==== Nominee ====
- John Hoeven, incumbent U.S. senator

==== Eliminated in primary ====
- Riley Kuntz, oil worker

==== Withdrawn ====
- Rick Becker, state representative (running as Independent)

=== Endorsements ===
John Hoeven

Executive branch officials

- Donald Trump, 45th president of the United States (2017–2021)

U.S. senators

- Kevin Cramer, U.S. senator from North Dakota (2019–present) and former U.S. representative from ND-AL (2013–2019)

Organizations

- North Dakota Republican Party
- Pro-Israel America

=== Results ===
Results by county: Hoeven: 70–80%; 80–90%

Republican primary results
Party	Candidate	Votes	%
Republican	John Hoeven (incumbent)	59,529	77.8
Republican	Riley Kuntz	16,400	21.4
Write-in		557	0.7
Total votes		76,486	100.0

== Democratic-NPL primary ==
=== Candidates ===
==== Nominee ====
- Katrina Christiansen, University of Jamestown engineering professor

==== Eliminated in primary ====
- Michael Steele, small business owner

=== Endorsements ===
Katrina Christiansen

Organizations

- North Dakota Democratic–Nonpartisan League Party

=== Results ===
Results by county: Christiansen: 50–60%; 60–70%; 70–80%; 80–90%

Democratic–NPL primary results
Party	Candidate	Votes	%
Democratic–NPL	Katrina Christiansen	17,187	76.8
Democratic–NPL	Michael Steele	5,174	23.1
Write-in		24	0.1
Total votes		22,385	100.0

== Independent ==
=== Candidates ===
==== Qualified ====
- Rick Becker, state representative

== General election ==
Results by state senate district

=== Predictions ===
Source	Ranking	As of
The Cook Political Report	Solid R	November 19, 2021
Inside Elections	Solid R	July 1, 2022
Sabato's Crystal Ball	Safe R	August 2, 2022
Politico	Solid R	April 1, 2022
RCP	Safe R	January 10, 2022
Fox News	Solid R	May 12, 2022
DDHQ	Solid R	July 20, 2022
538	Solid R	August 4, 2022
The Economist	Safe R	September 7, 2022

=== Post-primary endorsements ===
Katrina Christiansen (D–NPL)

Organizations

- National Women's Political Caucus
- Vote Common Good

=== Results ===

2022 United States Senate election in North Dakota
Party	Candidate	Votes	%	±%
Republican	John Hoeven (incumbent)	135,474	56.41%	−22.07%
Democratic–NPL	Katrina Christiansen	59,995	24.98%	+8.01%
Independent	Rick Becker	44,406	18.49%	N/A
Write-in		265	0.11%	N/A
Total votes		240,140	100.0%	
Republican hold				

==== By county ====
County	John Hoeven Republican		Katrina Christiansen Democratic–NPL		Rick Becker Independent		All others		Margin		Total votes
County	#	%	#	%	#	%	#	%	#	%	Total votes
Adams	651	70.1%	126	13.6%	152	16.4%	0	0.0%	499	53.7% (Note: Compares margin over Becker.)	929
Barnes	2,314	59.5%	978	25.2%	592	15.2%	4	0.1%	1,336	34.3%	3,888
Benson	749	50.6%	470	31.8%	260	17.6%	1	0.1%	279	18.8%	1,480
Billings	381	70.9%	48	8.9%	108	20.1%	0	0.0%	273	50.8%	537
Bottineau	1,803	63.2%	463	16.2%	586	20.5%	1	0.1%	1,217	42.7%	2,853
Bowman	1,003	74.0%	126	9.3%	224	16.5%	3	0.2%	779	57.5%	1,356
Burke	494	63.6%	62	8.0%	220	28.3%	1	0.1%	274	35.3%	777
Burleigh	18,759	53.0%	7,654	21.6%	8,952	25.3%	48	0.1%	9,807	27.7%	35,413
Cass	26,520	49.2%	21,360	39.6%	5,923	11.0%	69	0.1%	5,160	9.6%	53,872
Cavalier	1,123	71.5%	267	17.0%	179	11.4%	1	0.1%	856	54.5%	1,570
Dickey	1,211	68.0%	335	18.8%	234	13.1%	2	0.1%	876	69.2%	1,782
Divide	657	64.2%	161	15.7%	206	20.1%	0	0.0%	451	44.1%	1,024
Dunn	1,107	67.0%	189	11.4%	356	21.5%	1	0.1%	751	45.5%	1,653
Eddy	543	58.0%	204	21.8%	188	20.1%	1	0.1%	339	36.2%	936
Emmons	915	59.3%	106	6.9%	518	33.6%	3	0.2%	397	25.7%	1,542
Foster	798	63.4%	198	15.7%	263	20.9%	0	0.0%	535	42.5%	1,259
Golden Valley	551	70.8%	78	10.0%	149	19.2%	0	0.0%	402	51.6%	778
Grand Forks	9,954	52.7%	6,474	34.3%	2,438	12.9%	21	0.1%	3,480	18.4%	18,887
Grant	755	67.8%	103	9.2%	256	23.0%	0	0.0%	499	44.8%	1,114
Griggs	656	66.0%	178	17.9%	160	16.1%	0	0.0%	478	68.1%	994
Hettinger	718	69.2%	113	10.9%	203	19.6%	3	0.3%	515	48.8%	1,037
Kidder	657	61.9%	119	11.2%	285	26.9%	0	0.0%	372	35.0%	1,061
LaMoure	1,124	68.3%	119	11.2%	285	26.9%	0	0.0%	372	35.0%	1,061
Logan	541	65.9%	68	8.3%	212	25.8%	0	0.0%	329	40.1%	821
McHenry	1,265	58.6%	297	13.8%	594	27.5%	2	0.1%	671	31.1%	2,158
McIntosh	780	70.6%	123	11.1%	202	18.3%	0	0.0%	578	52.3%	1,105
McKenzie	2,229	69.5%	407	12.7%	564	17.6%	7	0.2%	1,665	51.9%	3,207
McLean	2,385	56.2%	720	17.0%	1,132	26.7%	4	0.1%	1,253	39.5%	4,241
Mercer	2,213	61.8%	429	12.0%	937	26.2%	4	0.1%	1,276	35.6%	3,583
Morton	6,130	54.0%	2,101	18.5%	3,115	27.4%	12	0.1%	3,015	26.6%	11,358
Mountrail	1,393	53.1%	632	24.1%	593	22.6%	3	0.1%	761	29.0%	2,621
Nelson	963	63.4%	362	23.8%	192	12.6%	1	0.1%	601	39.6%	1,518
Oliver	509	61.1%	82	9.8%	241	28.9%	1	0.1%	268	32.2%	833
Pembina	1,737	70.6%	406	16.5%	318	12.9%	0	0.0%	1,331	54.1%	2,461
Pierce	876	58.6%	227	15.2%	391	26.2%	1	0.1%	485	32.4%	1,495
Ramsey	2,424	60.3%	890	22.2%	701	17.5%	2	0.01%	1,534	38.1%	4,017
Ransom	1,045	57.4%	527	28.9%	248	13.6%	1	0.1%	518	38.5%	1,821
Renville	547	61.0%	87	9.7%	262	29.2%	0	0.0%	285	31.8%	896
Richland	3,756	63.0%	1,411	23.7%	796	13.3%	3	0.1%	2,345	39.3%	5,966
Rolette	1,118	40.9%	1,268	46.4%	342	12.5%	4	0.1%	-150	-5.5%	2,732
Sargent	988	62.5%	403	25.5%	190	12.0%	0	0.0%	585	37.0%	1,581
Sheridan	361	57.9%	64	10.3%	199	31.9%	0	0.0%	162	26.0%	624
Sioux	176	30.1%	301	51.5%	106	18.2%	1	0.2%	-125	-21.4%	584
Slope	226	74.8%	23	7.6%	53	17.5%	0	0.0%	173	57.3%	302
Stark	5,927	64.8%	1,138	12.4%	2,073	22.7%	8	0.1%	3,854	42.1%	9146
Steele	469	59.4%	222	28.1%	98	12.4%	1	0.1%	247	31.3%	790
Stutsman	3,862	57.4%	1,533	22.8%	1,323	19.7%	6	0.1%	2,329	28.6%	6,724
Towner	550	64.3%	178	20.8%	127	14.9%	0	0.0%	372	43.5%	855
Traill	1,795	60.4%	822	27.7%	349	11.7%	6	0.2%	973	32.7%	2,972
Walsh	2,416	69.4%	640	18.4%	421	12.1%	4	0.1%	1,776	51.0%	3,481
Ward	9,849	58.8%	3,314	19.8%	3,568	21.3%	25	0.1%	6,281	39.0%	16,756
Wells	923	54.5%	225	13.3%	546	32.2%	1	0.1%	377	22.3%	1,695
Williams	4,578	61.8%	970	13.1%	1,853	25.0%	8	0.1%	2,725	36.8%	7,409
Totals	135,474	56.4%	59,995	25.0%	44,406	18.5%	265	0.1%	75,479	31.4%	240,140

Counties that flipped from Republican to Democratic

- Rolette (largest CDP: Belcourt)

== See also ==
- 2022 United States Senate elections
- 2022 North Dakota elections
