= George Nodland =

American politician

Member of the North Dakota Senate from the 36th district
- In office December 1, 2008 – December 1, 2012
- Preceded by: Herbert Urlacher
- Succeeded by: Kelly Armstrong

Personal details
- Born: June 1, 1945 (age 81) Dickinson, North Dakota
- Party: Republican

George Nodland (born June 1, 1945) is an American politician who served in the North Dakota Senate from the 36th district from 2008 to 2012.
