= Julie Fedorchak =

American politician (born 1968)

- Official portrait, 2026

Member of the U.S. House of Representatives from North Dakota's at-large district
- Incumbent
- Assumed office January 3, 2025
- Preceded by: Kelly Armstrong

Member of the North Dakota Public Service Commission
- In office December 31, 2012 – January 3, 2025
- Governor: Jack Dalrymple; Doug Burgum; Kelly Armstrong
- Preceded by: Kevin Cramer
- Succeeded by: Jill Kringstad

Personal details
- Born: Julie Ann Liffrig; September 28, 1968 (age 58) Williston, North Dakota, U.S.
- Party: Republican
- Spouse: Michael Fedorchak
- Children: 3
- Education: University of North Dakota (BA)
- Website: House website Campaign website

Julie Ann Fedorchak (née Liffrig; born September 28, 1968) is an American politician serving as the U.S. representative for North Dakota's at-large congressional district since 2025. Previously, she served on the North Dakota Public Service Commission from 2012 to 2025 after being appointed by Governor Jack Dalrymple.

Fedorchak was first elected to Congress in 2024. She is a member of the moderate Republican Governance Group.

== Background ==
Fedorchak was born in Williston, North Dakota in 1968. She is the youngest of eight children to parents Duane and Doris Liffrig. Duane previously served as Highway Commissioner to former Governor of North Dakota Allen Olson.

Fedorchak graduated from the University of North Dakota with a Bachelor of Arts in Journalism. She later served as communications director for Governor Ed Schafer before becoming a columnist for the Bismarck Tribune and holding numerous other media roles.

Fedorchak has also served on numerous boards.

== Public Service Commission ==
In December 2012, Governor Jack Dalrymple appointed Fedorchak to the North Dakota Public Service Commission after a seat opened. She later won an election to hold the seat in 2014. Shortly after being fully elected to the commission, Fedorchak was also elected to chair the commission for a two-year term.

Fedorchak was later re-elected in 2016 and in 2022 by wide margins.

== U.S. House of Representatives ==
=== Elections ===
==== 2024 ====
In February 2024, Fedorchak announced her entry into the race for North Dakota's open U.S. House seat. Fedorchak cited matters such as abortion, energy, and agriculture as issues she would focus on as a representative. Her main primary opponents were former state Representative Rick Becker, farmer Alex Balazs, activist Sharlet Mohr, and Miss America 2018 Cara Mund for the Republican nomination.

During the NDGOP endorsement convention, candidate Rick Becker encouraged his supporters to write in spoiler ballots to prevent an endorsement from going through. After 2 failed ballots, Fedorchak withdrew from the endorsement to allow the convention to continue, giving Alex Balazs the endorsement. Fedorchak received the most state level endorsements of any candidate in the race, including over 50 legislators, U.S. Senator John Hoeven, Governor Doug Burgum, and former President Donald Trump.

In the June 11 primary, Fedorchak won the Republican nomination with 46% of the vote. She would face Democrat Trygve Hammer in the general election. Shortly after the primary, Fedorchak's campaign filed an FEC complaint regarding election interference after a mass of texts and emails were sent falsely stating she had dropped out of the race on the day of the election.

Fedorchak defeated Hammer in the election 69% to 30%, making her the first woman to be elected to the U.S. House of Representatives from North Dakota. She is also the first Republican woman elected to Congress from North Dakota and the first woman to represent North Dakota in Congress since Heidi Heitkamp, who served in the U.S. Senate from 2013 to 2019.

==== 2026 ====
On January 5, 2026, Fedorchak announced she would run for reelection to the House of Representatives, having received an endorsement from President Trump months prior in August. She faced a primary challenge from her former 2024 opponent Alex Balazs, who announced his intention to run for the Republican nomination a month prior. Fedorchak won the primary with 72% of the vote after skipping the NDGOP convention.

She will face a rematch with Democrat Trygve Hammer in the general election.

=== Tenure ===
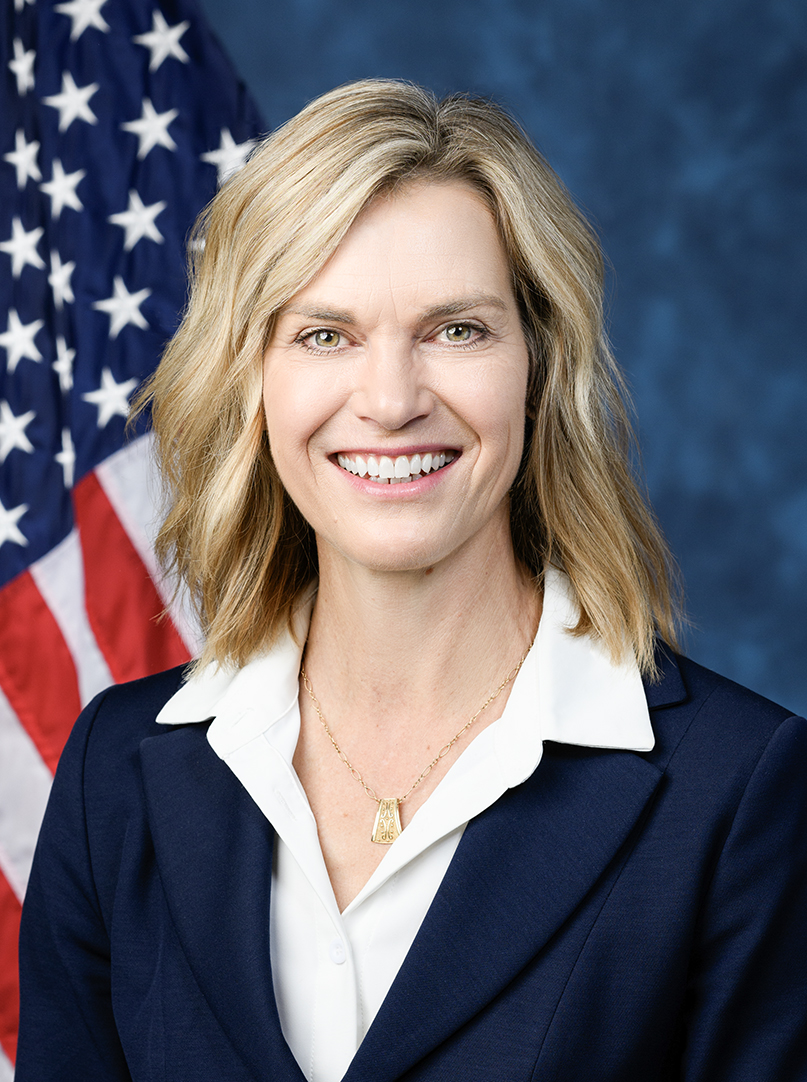
Official portrait, 2025

Fedorchak was sworn in on January 3, 2025. She was chosen in her first term to serve on the Energy and Commerce committee, where her predecessor had served as the Vice-Chair. Fedorchak is also the first freshman member in 14 years to be appointed to the committee.

Following a trend of congress members hosting town hall meetings with constituents, Fedorchak hosted a virtual town hall on March 25, 2025. When asked about the meeting being virtual, Fedorchak stated “I simply haven’t found any other venue that allows me to talk to like tonight 3,000 North Dakotans probably more than that because of Facebook and the online options.” She has since hosted numerous online town halls. Fedorchak has faced harsh criticism from constituents over the virtual platform.

In June of 2026, Fedorchak and Democratic Representative Emily Randall established the Bipartisan Nuclear Triad Caucus, dedicated to further improvement and work on the United States nuclear triad system.

Fedorchak with Trump, 2025

On July 1, 2026, Fedorchak became the first member of Congress to fly on the new interim Air Force One on its maiden flight, which was to North Dakota for the commencement of the Theodore Roosevelt Presidential Library.

=== Committee assignments ===
- Committee on Energy and Commerce
  - Subcommittee on Communications and Technology
  - Subcommittee on Energy
  - Subcommittee on Environment

== Political positions ==
=== Energy ===
On April 10, 2025, Fedorchak introduced legislation to remove the tax credits given in the Inflation Reduction Act to solar and wind energy, saying the credits pose “unprecedented reliability risks to the nations electrical grid due to their intermittent nature.” However, she stated projects currently operating receiving these credits should continue to.

=== Ethics ===
During the 2025 United States government shutdown, Fedorchak stated she would support and potentially purpose plans to punish congress for allowing shutdowns, she further expressed enthusiasm at the senate eventually passing a bill. Two days after the shutdown ended, Fedorchak announced her intention to introduce legislation that would withhold congressional pay during shutdowns.

Entering 2026, Fedorchak alongside numerous other Republicans introduced a bill to ban congressional stock trading.

=== Foreign Policy ===
Fedorchak meets with Lai Ching-te, 2025

In August 2025, Fedorchak and other freshman members visited Israel.

=== Trump administration ===
In July of 2025, Fedorchak spoke out in avid support of the One Big Beautiful Bill Act. She was also vocal in support of the United States strikes on Iranian nuclear sites. Fedorchak called for the release of the Epstein Files, later in November voted with almost every other member of Congress to release the files.

== Personal life ==
Fedorchak has had three children with her husband, Michael Fedorchak. They have been members of the Cathedral of the Holy Spirit congregation in Bismarck for 30 years.

Fedorchak's father, Duane, suffered from Alzheimer's disease before dying in 2015.

== Electoral history ==
North Dakota Public Service Commissioner special election, 2014
| Party | Candidate | Votes | % |
|---|---|---|---|
| Republican | Julie Fedorchak | 156,596 | 65.99 |
| Democratic–NPL | Tyler Axness | 80,319 | 33.84 |
| Write-in | | 401 | 0.17 |
| Total votes | | 237,316 | 100.00 |

North Dakota Public Service Commissioner election, 2016
| Party | Candidate | Votes | % |
|---|---|---|---|
| Republican | Julie Fedorchak | 218,961 | 68.76 |
| Democratic–NPL | Marlo Hunte-Beaubrun | 72,028 | 22.62 |
| Libertarian | Thomas Skadeland | 26,913 | 8.45 |
| Write-in | | 563 | 0.18 |
| Total votes | | 318,465 | 100.00 |

North Dakota Public Service Commissioner election, 2022
| Party | Candidate | Votes | % |
|---|---|---|---|
| Republican | Julie Fedorchak | 165,183 | 71.3 |
| Democratic–NPL | Melanie Moniz | 66,196 | 28.57 |
| Write-in | | 311 | 0.13 |
| Total votes | | 231,690 | 100.00 |

North Dakota At-Large Congressional District Republican Primary, 2024
| Party | Candidate | Votes | % |
|---|---|---|---|
| Republican | Julie Fedorchak | 43,137 | 45.90 |
| Republican | Rick Becker | 27,771 | 29.57 |
| Republican | Cara Mund | 18,343 | 19.53 |
| Republican | Alexander C. Balazs | 3,758 | 4.00 |
| Republican | Sharlet Mohr | 795 | 0.35 |
| Write-in | | 109 | 0.12 |
| Total votes | | 93,913 | 100.00 |

2024 United States House of Representatives election in North Dakota
| Party | Candidate | Votes | % | ±% |
|---|---|---|---|---|
| Republican | Julie Fedorchak | 249,101 | 69.24% | +7.04% |
| Democratic–NPL | Trygve Hammer | 109,231 | 30.36% | N/A |
| Write-in | | 1,455 | 0.40% | +0.17% |
| Total votes | | 359,787 | 100.00% | N/A |

North Dakota At-Large Congressional District Republican Primary, 2026
| Party | Candidate | Votes | % |
|---|---|---|---|
| Republican | Julie Fedorchak | 59,719 | 72.9 |
| Republican | Alex Balazs | 22,196 | 27.1 |
| Total votes | | 81,915 | 100.0 |

2026 United States House of Representatives election in North Dakota
| Party | Candidate | Votes | % | ±% |
|---|---|---|---|---|
| Republican | Julie Fedorchak (incumbent) | 134,477 | 57.41% | –11.83 |
| Democratic–NPL | Trygve Hammer | 85,892 | 36.67% | +6.31 |
| Independent | Charles Tuttle | 9,282 | 3.96% | N/A |
| Independent | Helene Neville | 4,604 | 1.97% | N/A |
| Total votes | | 234,255 | 100.0% | |

Political offices
| Preceded by Kevin Cramer | Member of the North Dakota Public Service Commission; 2012–2025 | Succeeded by Jill Kringstad |
U.S. House of Representatives
| Preceded by Kelly Armstrong | Member of the U.S. House of Representatives from North Dakota's at-large congressional district 2025–present | Incumbent |
U.S. order of precedence (ceremonial)
| Preceded by Gabe Evans | United States representatives by seniority 378th | Succeeded by Shomari Figures |
