= Brian Kroshus =

American businessman and politician

25th Tax Commissioner of North Dakota
- Incumbent
- Assumed office January 4, 2022
- Governor: Doug Burgum; Kelly Armstrong
- Preceded by: Ryan Rauschenberger

Member of the North Dakota Public Service Commission
- In office March 20, 2017 – January 4, 2022
- Governor: Doug Burgum
- Preceded by: Brian Kalk
- Succeeded by: Sheri Haugen-Hoffart

Personal details
- Born: 1963 or 1964 (age 61–62) Fargo, North Dakota, U.S.
- Party: Republican
- Education: North Dakota State University (BS)

Brian Kroshus (born 1963/1964) is an American businessman and politician serving as the Tax Commissioner of North Dakota. He is a former member of the North Dakota Public Service Commission. Kroshus was appointed to both positions by Governor Doug Burgum.

== Early life and education ==
Kroshus was born in Fargo, North Dakota and earned a Bachelor of Science degree in animal science from North Dakota State University. As a child, he participated in 4-H programs.

== Career ==
A member of the Republican Party, Kroshus owns and operates a cattle and grain business. He also worked as the publisher of The Bismarck Tribune for 10 years, and later worked as a publisher of Lee Agri-Media Newspaper Group. He also worked for Forum Communications.

In February 2017, Kroshus was selected to serve as a member of the North Dakota Public Service Commission, succeeding Brian Kalk. Kroshus was a candidate for re-election in 2018. In 2019, he became chair of the Public Service Commission. He was reelected in 2020 with 68% of the vote. He served as chair in 2020.

Party political offices
Preceded by Ryan Rauschenberger	Republican nominee for Tax Commissioner of North Dakota; 2022	Most recent
Political offices
Preceded by Brian Kalk	Member of the North Dakota Public Service Commission; 2017–2022	Succeeded by Sheri Haugen-Hoffart
Preceded by Ryan Rauschenberger	Tax Commissioner of North Dakota; 2022–present	Incumbent
