= Scot Kelsh =

American architect and politician

Member of the North Dakota House of Representatives from the 11th district
- In office January 1997 – January 2015
- Succeeded by: Kris Wallman

Personal details
- Born: August 14, 1962 (age 64) Ellendale, North Dakota, U.S.
- Party: Democratic
- Education: North Dakota State University (BA, BS)

Scot Kelsh is an American architect and politician serving who has served as a member of the North Dakota House of Representatives, representing the 11th district, since 1997 to 2015.

Kelsh earned a Bachelor of Arts and Bachelor of Science from North Dakota State University. He has worked as an architect and volunteer firefighter.

Party political offices
Preceded by Daryl Splichal	Democratic nominee for Auditor of North Dakota; 2012	Vacant Title next held by Patrick Hart; 2020
