= Jill Kringstad =

Republican politician from North Dakota

Member of the North Dakota Public Service Commission
- Incumbent
- Assumed office January 6, 2025
- Governor: Kelly Armstrong
- Preceded by: Julie Fedorchak

Personal details
- Born: Jill Steinwand Bismarck, North Dakota, U.S.
- Party: Republican
- Spouse: Ben Kringstad
- Children: 3
- Education: Minnesota State University, Moorhead (BA)

Jill Kringstad (née Steinwand) is an American politician from North Dakota. In January 2025, Kringstad was appointed to serve on the North Dakota Public Service Commission after commissioner Julie Fedorchak was elected to the U.S. House.

== Education and career ==
Kringstad was born in Bismarck, North Dakota, but later moved to Dickinson for elementary school. She would later go back and graduate at Bismarck Century High School.

In 2012, Kringstad graduated from Minnesota State University Moorhead with a bachelor's in Accounting. From 2013 to 2016, Kringstad worked for Basin Electric Power Cooperative as both an accountant and an internal auditor. Kringstad began working as an accountant for the PSC in 2016 before eventually becoming manager of business operations from 2019 until 2025.

Kringstad also served as an intern for both senator John Hoeven and former representative Rick Berg.

== Public Service Commission ==
On January 6, 2025, Kringstad was appointed by governor Kelly Armstrong to serve on the North Dakota Public Service Commission after a seat opened with the election of Julie Fedorchak to Congress. The seat will be up for election to serve the remaining years of Fedorchak's term in 2026.

Upon being appointed, Kringstad stated "I look forward to supporting the other important work the Commission does, including reclamation of coal mines, and protecting the public through our various testing and safety programs." One of her first actions was re-electing fellow commissioner Randy Christmann to be the chair.

== Personal life ==
Kringstad is married to her husband, Ben, a teacher. They have 3 children together.

Kringstad volunteer worked the Honor Flight for veterans in 2018, citing her grandfather who served in the military.

Political offices
Preceded by Julie Fedorchak	Member of the North Dakota Public Service Commission; 2025–present	Incumbent
