= Spencer Berry =

American politician

Member of the North Dakota Senate from the 27th district
- In office December 1, 2010 – December 1, 2014
- Preceded by: Jim Pomeroy
- Succeeded by: Jonathan Casper

Personal details
- Born: November 4, 1957 (age 68) Rapid City, South Dakota
- Party: Republican

Spencer Berry (born November 4, 1957) is an American politician who served in the North Dakota Senate from the 27th district from 2010 to 2014.
