= Sheri Haugen-Hoffart =

Republican politician from North Dakota

Member of the North Dakota Public Service Commission
- Incumbent
- Assumed office February 11, 2022
- Governor: Doug Burgum; Kelly Armstrong
- Preceded by: Brian Kroshus

Personal details
- Born: Rugby, North Dakota, U.S.
- Party: Republican
- Spouse: Richard
- Education: University of North Dakota (BA); University of Mary (MBA)

Sheri Haugen-Hoffart is an American politician from North Dakota serving as a member of the North Dakota Public Service Commission since 2022. She was appointed by governor Doug Burgum to fill a vacancy left by Brian Kroshus, who became North Dakota Tax Commissioner.

== Education and career ==
Haugen-Hoffart was born in Rugby, North Dakota to parents Orris and Marie Haugen. She graduated from the University of North Dakota with a bachelors in 1988 and later received a masters in management from University of Mary.

Haugen-Hoffart was a board member of numerous electrical companies, including Capital Electric Cooperative for 12 years. She also worked for the North Dakota Tax Commissioner’s office for 7 years prior to her appointment.

== Public Service Commission ==
On February 11, 2022, governor Doug Burgum announced he was appointing Haugen-Hoffart to the North Dakota Public Service Commission effective immediately. Her predecessor, Brian Kroshus, had been appointed by Burgum to become the state Tax Commissioner on January 4.

Haugen-Hoffart announced she would run in that years election to serve the remainder of Kroshus’ term. She would win the election against Dem-NPL candidate Trygve Hammer with 70% of the vote.

== Personal life ==
Haugen-Hoffart is married to Richard Hoffart, and the two live on land that has been in her family for three generations. She is a prominent activist for veterans and post traumatic stress disorder awareness.

Political offices
Preceded by Brian Kroshus	Member of the North Dakota Public Service Commission; 2022–present	Incumbent
