= Randel Christmann =

Republican politician from North Dakota

Randy Christmann

Member of the North Dakota Public Service Commission
- Incumbent
- Assumed office January 15, 2013
- Governor: Jack Dalrymple; Doug Burgum; Kelly Armstrong
- Preceded by: Bonny Fetch

Personal details
- Born: June 16, 1960 (age 66) Hazen, North Dakota, U.S.
- Party: Republican
- Education: North Dakota State University (BA)

Randel Christmann is a Republican politician from North Dakota. He represented the 33rd district in the North Dakota Senate from 1995 to 2013. In 2012, he was elected to the North Dakota Public Service Commission, as one of three members elected statewide.

== Early life & Education ==
Randel Christmann was born on June 16, 1960, in Hazen, North Dakota. He graduated from Hazen High School and attended North Dakota State University where he earned a Bachelor's degree in Business Administration in 1982.

A rancher, he served in the North Dakota Army National Guard from 1977 to 1983.

== Politics ==
Randy was elected to the North Dakota Senate in 1994 when he upset a long-time incumbent Democratic committee chairman, helping Republicans achieve majority status in the North Dakota Senate. He initially focused mostly on energy, taxation, and natural resources issues.

Former Governor Ed Schafer appointed Randy to serve as one of the two legislative appointees on the Lignite Research Council. He has continued to serve in this position under then-Governor John Hoeven and former Governor Jack Dalrymple and is currently Vice-Chairman of the Lignite Research Council.

In 1999 the members of West River Telecommunications (WRT) elected Randy to serve on its board of directors. During his 13 years on the board, WRT nearly doubled in size, growing into a $100 million company with more than 70 employees. WRT provides telephone and broadband service to part or all of 17 counties in North and South Dakota. West River is also a leader in the development of cellular service in North Dakota as a major partner with Verizon Wireless.

Following the statewide general election in 2000, Senate Republicans chose Randy to serve as their Assistant Majority Leader. He had been re-elected to this post every two years thereafter, making him one of North Dakota’s longest serving legislative leaders in recent memory. He also served on the Senate Appropriations Committee.

== Personal life ==
He is married to Bethanie Christmann. They live in Bismarck, but continue to spend weekends on the ranch near Hazen.

Christmann is a member of the National Rifle Association of America, the American Farm Bureau Federation, the North Dakota Stockmen's Association. In 2007, he received the Public Service Award from the North Dakota Petroleum Marketers Association. In 2016, the Lignite Energy Council presented him with the Distinguished Service Award for a Regulatory Program.

Political offices
Preceded by Bonny Fetch	Member of the North Dakota Public Service Commission; 2013–present	Incumbent
