= North Dakota Republican Party =

North Dakota affiliate of the Republican Party

- Chairperson: Matthew Simon
- Senate Leader: David Hogue
- House Leader: Mike Lefor
- Founded: 1889
- Headquarters: 1029 North Fifth St. Bismarck, ND 58501
- Ideology: Conservatism
- National affiliation: Republican Party
- Colors: Red
- Seats in the U.S. Senate (N.D. seats): 2 / 2
- Seats in the U.S. House (N.D. seats): 1 / 1
- Seats in the North Dakota Senate: 42 / 47
- Seats in the North Dakota House of Representatives: 82 / 94

Election symbol

Website
- www.ndgop.org

The North Dakota Republican Party is the North Dakota affiliate of the United States Republican Party.

Its platform is conservative. It is currently the dominant party in the state, controlling North Dakota's at-large U.S. House seat, both U.S. Senate seats and the governorship, and it has supermajorities in both houses of the state legislature.

== History ==
The state Republican Party has always been a major force in state politics, in many cases having a dominant position. Founded in 1889, the Party initially dominated all state politics for the state's first 20 years of existence, with the exception of a brief period from 1893 to 1894 in which the North Dakota Democratic-Independent Party briefly overthrew the Republican Party.

In the early 20th century, the Party was effectively divided into two groups that nominated candidates on the Republican ticket, the progressive Non-Partisan League (NPL) and the conservative Independent Voters Association (IVA). This period ended when the NPL merged with the state Democratic Party, and the IVA effectively became known as the Republican Party.

The Party holds its convention in the spring of election years, usually rotating the convention between four of the state's largest cities: Bismarck, Fargo, Grand Forks, and Minot.

=== Notable figures ===
- Doug Burgum - United States Secretary of the Interior and candidate for president in 2024
- Thomas S. Kleppe - former United States Secretary of the Interior
- Milton Young - United States Senator who served as President pro tempore for a day
- Ed Schafer - former Governor of North Dakota and former United States Secretary of Agriculture

== Current elected officials ==
The North Dakota Republican Party controls all 12 of the statewide offices and holds supermajorities in both the North Dakota Senate and the North Dakota House of Representatives. Republicans also hold both of the state's U.S. Senate seats and the state's at-large congressional district.

=== Members of Congress ===
==== U.S. Senate ====
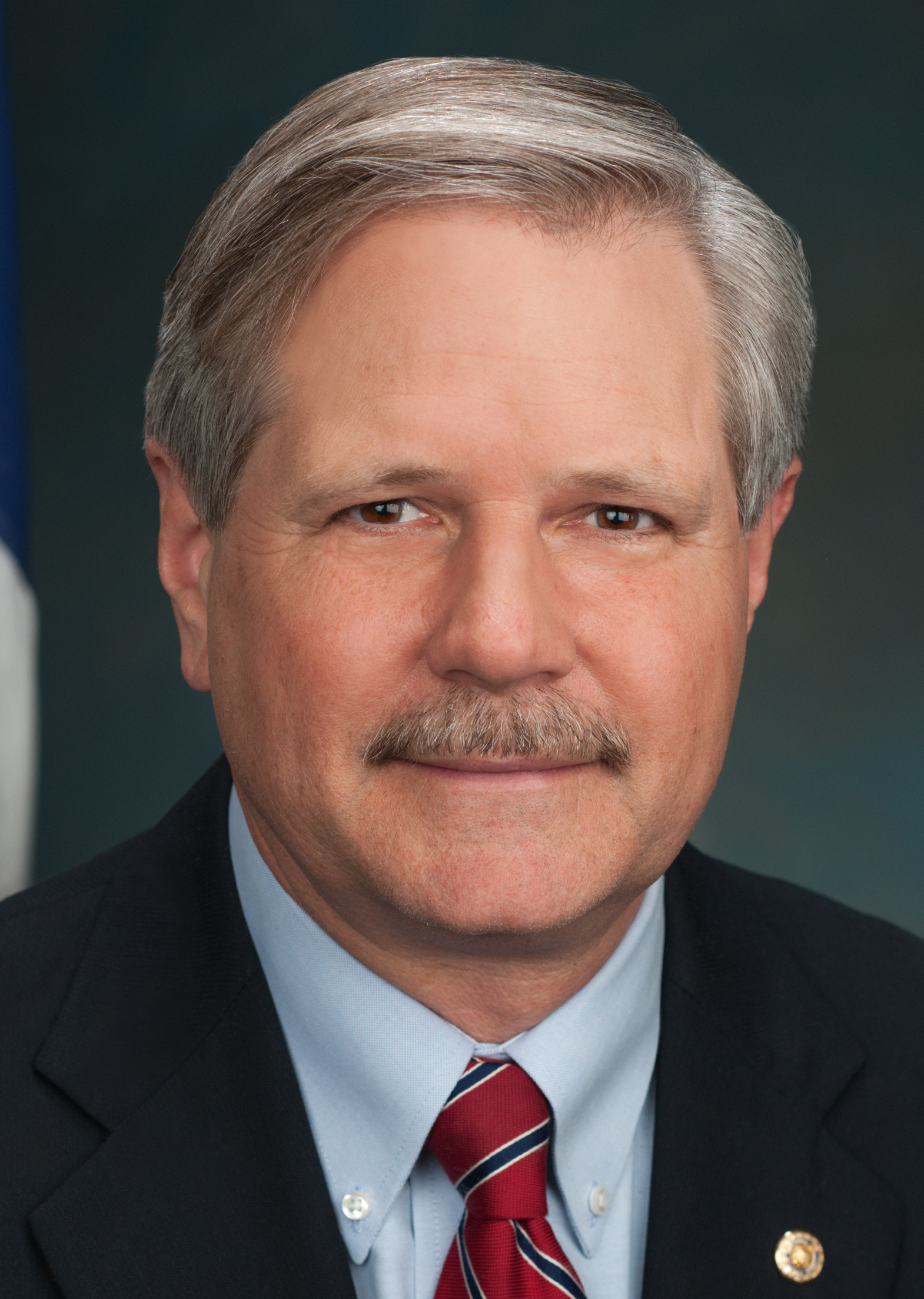
Senior U.S. Senator John Hoeven

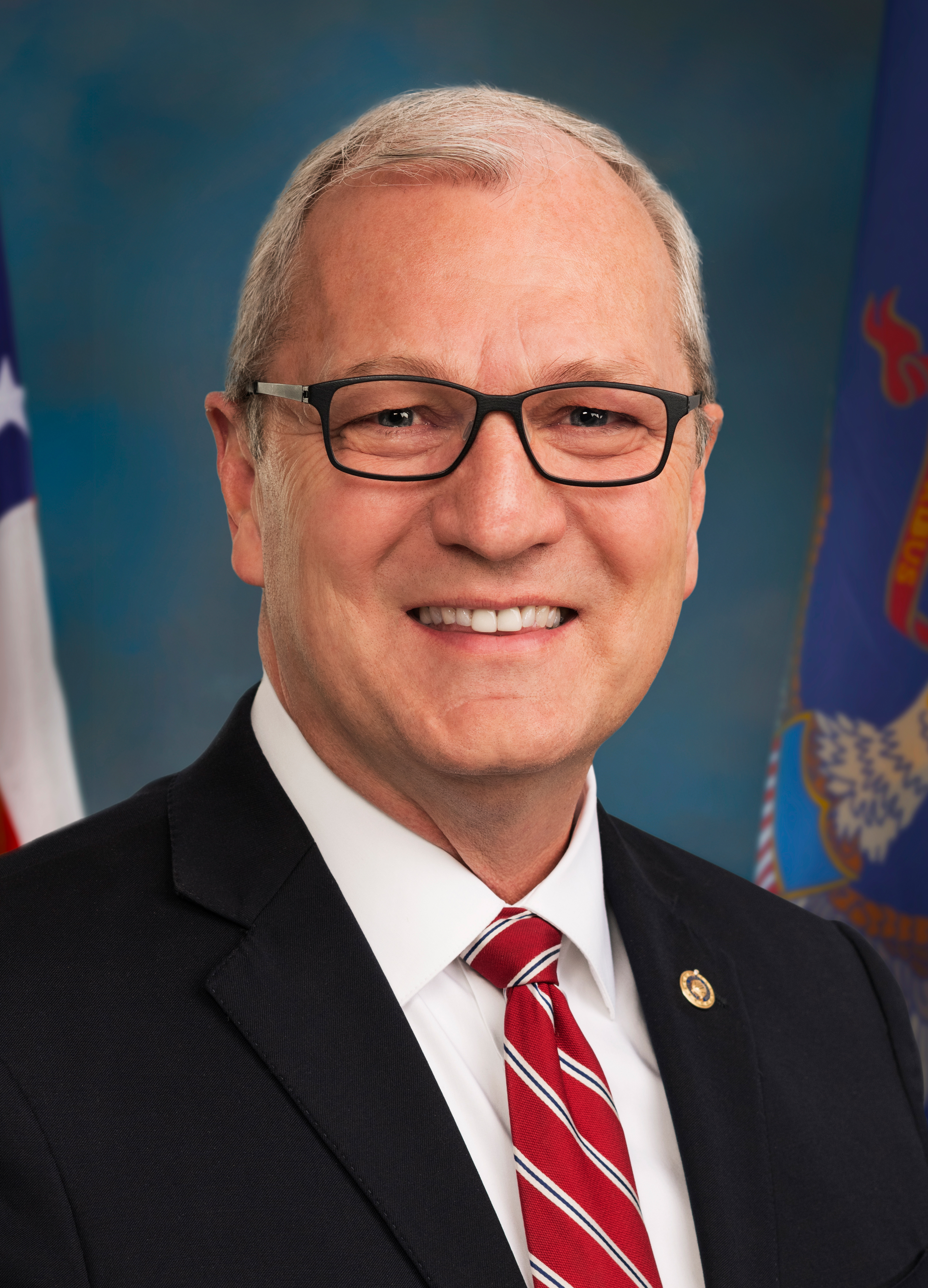
Junior U.S. Senator Kevin Cramer

==== U.S. House of Representatives ====
District	Member	Photo
At-large	Julie Fedorchak	

=== Statewide offices ===
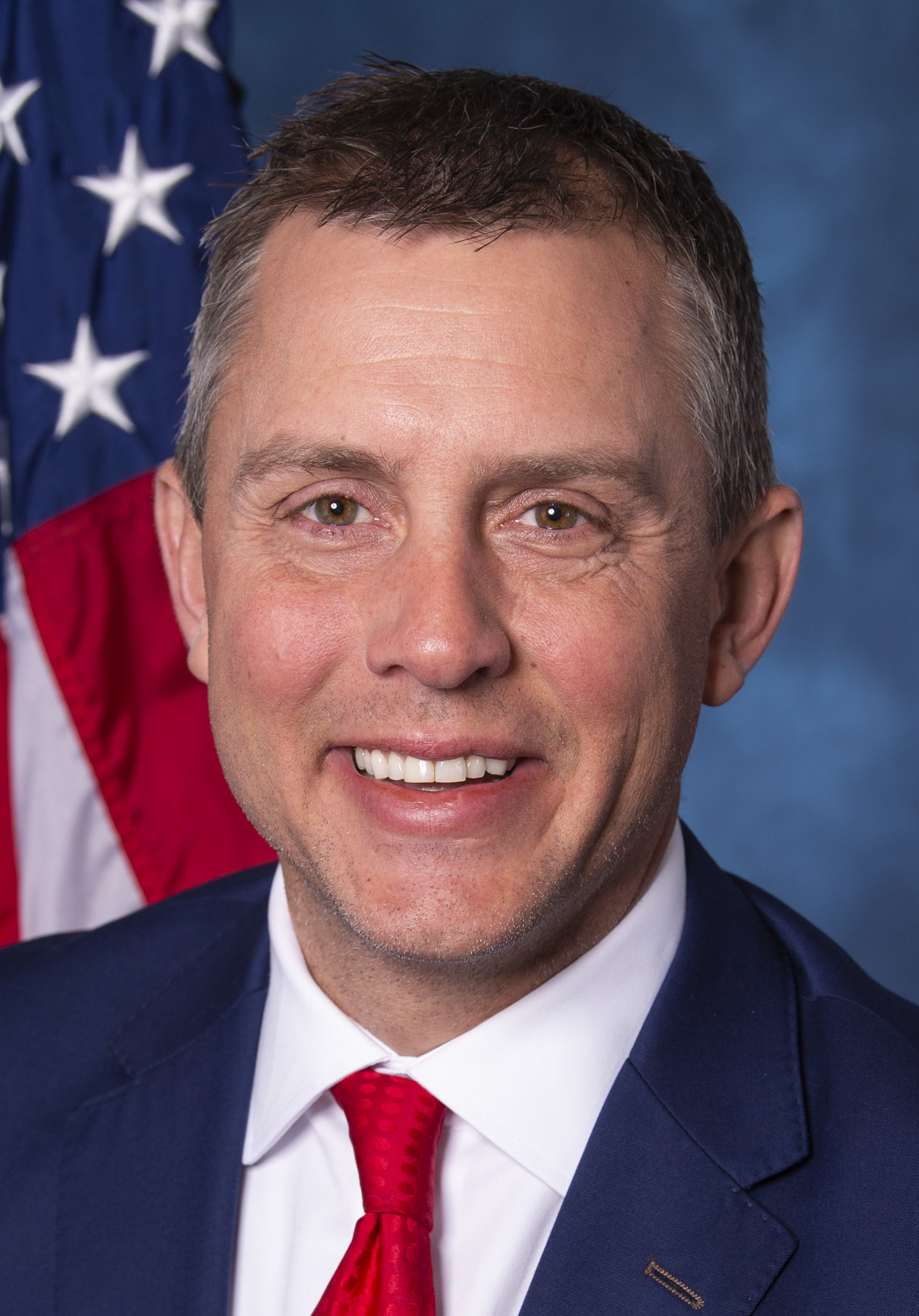
Governor Kelly Armstrong

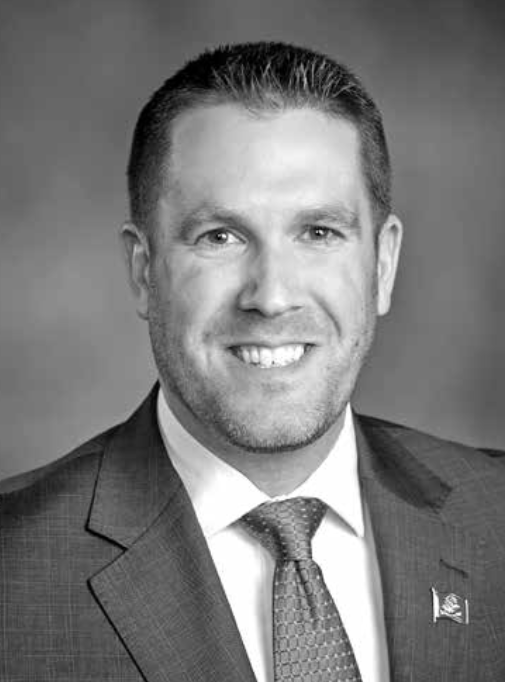
Secretary of State Michael Howe

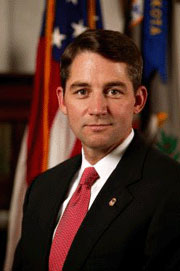
Attorney General Drew Wrigley
- Lieutenant Governor: Michelle Strinden
- Insurance Commissioner: Jon Godfread
- Tax Commissioner: Brian Kroshus
- Auditor: Josh Gallion
- North Dakota State Treasurer: Thomas Beadle
- North Dakota Agriculture Commissioner: Doug Goehring
- Public Service Commissioners: Sheri Haugen-Hoffart, Jill Kringstad, Randy Christmann

=== Legislative ===
- President Pro Tempore of the Senate: Brad Bekkedahl
  - Senate Majority Leader: David Hogue
- Speaker of the House: Robin Weisz
  - House Majority Leader: Mike Lefor

== Election results ==
=== Presidential ===
North Dakota Republican Party presidential election results
Election	Presidential ticket	Votes	Vote %	Electoral votes	Result
1892	Benjamin Harrison/Whitelaw Reid	17,519	48.50%	1 / 3 (Note: Though James B. Weaver (Populist) carried the popular vote in North Dakota, Benjamin Harrison received one of the state's electoral votes.)	Lost
1896	William McKinley/Garret Hobart	26,335	55.57%	3 / 3	Won
1900	William McKinley/Theodore Roosevelt	35,898	62.12%	3 / 3	Won
1904	Theodore Roosevelt/Charles W. Fairbanks	52,595	75.12%	4 / 4	Won
1908	William Howard Taft/James S. Sherman	57,680	61.02%	4 / 4	Won
1912	William Howard Taft/Nicholas M. Butler	23,090	26.67%	0 / 5	Lost
1916	Charles E. Hughes/Charles W. Fairbanks	53,471	46.34%	0 / 5	Lost
1920	Warren G. Harding/Calvin Coolidge	160,072	77.97%	5 / 5	Won
1924	Calvin Coolidge/Charles G. Dawes	94,931	47.68%	5 / 5	Won
1928	Herbert Hoover/Charles Curtis	131,441	54.80%	5 / 5	Won
1932	Herbert Hoover/Charles Curtis	71,772	28.00%	0 / 4	Lost
1936	Alf Landon/Frank Knox	72,751	26.58%	0 / 4	Lost
1940	Wendell Willkie/Charles L. McNary	154,590	55.06%	4 / 4	Lost
1944	Thomas E. Dewey/John W. Bricker	118,535	53.84%	4 / 4	Lost
1948	Thomas E. Dewey/Earl Warren	115,139	52.17%	4 / 4	Lost
1952	Dwight D. Eisenhower/Richard Nixon	191,712	70.97%	4 / 4	Won
1956	Dwight D. Eisenhower/Richard Nixon	156,766	61.72%	4 / 4	Won
1960	Richard Nixon/Henry Cabot Lodge Jr.	154,310	55.42%	4 / 4	Lost
1964	Barry Goldwater/William E. Miller	108,207	41.88%	0 / 4	Lost
1968	Richard Nixon/Spiro Agnew	138,669	55.94%	4 / 4	Won
1972	Richard Nixon/Spiro Agnew	174,109	62.07%	3 / 3	Won
1976	Gerald Ford/Bob Dole	152,470	51.66%	3 / 3	Lost
1980	Ronald Reagan/George H. W. Bush	193,695	64.23%	3 / 3	Won
1984	Ronald Reagan/George H. W. Bush	200,336	64.84%	3 / 3	Won
1988	George H. W. Bush/Dan Quayle	166,559	56.03%	3 / 3	Won
1992	George H. W. Bush/Dan Quayle	136,244	44.22%	3 / 3	Lost
1996	Bob Dole/Jack Kemp	125,050	46.94%	3 / 3	Lost
2000	George W. Bush/Dick Cheney	174,852	60.7%	3 / 3	Won
2004	George W. Bush/Dick Cheney	196,651	62.86%	3 / 3	Won
2008	John McCain/Sarah Palin	168,887	53.15%	3 / 3	Lost
2012	Mitt Romney/Paul Ryan	188,320	58.32%	3 / 3	Lost
2016	Donald Trump/Mike Pence	216,794	62.96%	3 / 3	Won
2020	Donald Trump/Mike Pence	235,595	65.11%	3 / 3	Lost
2024	Donald Trump/JD Vance	246,505	66.96%	3 / 3	Won

=== Gubernatorial ===
North Dakota Republican Party gubernatorial election results
Election	Gubernatorial candidate/ticket	Votes	Vote %	Result
1889	John Miller	25,365	66.58%	Won ✓
1890	Andrew H. Burke	19,053	52.23%	Won ✓
1892	Andrew H. Burke	17,236	47.57%	Lost ✗
1894	Roger Allin	23,723	55.76%	Won ✓
1896	Frank A. Briggs	25,918	55.61%	Won ✓
1898	Frederick B. Fancher	28,308	59.22%	Won ✓
1900	Frank White	34,052	59.20%	Won ✓
1902	Frank White	31,613	62.68%	Won ✓
1904	Elmore Y. Sarles	48,026	70.71%	Won ✓
1906	Elmore Y. Sarles	29,309	45.29%	Lost ✗
1908	C. A. Johnson	46,849	48.43%	Lost ✗
1910	C. A. Johnson	44,555	47.36%	Lost ✗
1912	L. B. Hanna	39,811	45.45%	Won ✓
1914	L. B. Hanna	44,279	49.58%	Won ✓
1916	Lynn Frazier	87,665	79.24%	Won ✓
1918	Lynn Frazier	54,517	59.75%	Won ✓
1920	Lynn Frazier	117,118	51.01%	Won ✓
1921 (recall)	Ragnvald Nestos	111,425	50.94%	Won ✓
1922	Ragnvald Nestos	110,321	57.65%	Won ✓
1924	Arthur G. Sorlie	101,170	53.93%	Won ✓
1926	Arthur G. Sorlie	131,003	81.74%	Won ✓
1928	George F. Shafer	131,193	56.50%	Won ✓
1930	George F. Shafer	133,264	73.62%	Won ✓
1932	William Langer	134,231	54.75%	Won ✓
1934	Lydia Cady Langer	127,954	46.61%	Lost ✗
1936	Walter Welford	95,697	34.70%	Lost ✗
1938	John N. Hagan	125,246	47.53%	Lost ✗
1940	Jack A. Patterson	101,287	36.89%	Lost ✗
1942	Oscar W. Hagen	74,577	42.38%	Lost ✗
1944	Fred G. Aandahl	107,863	52.02%	Won ✓
1946	Fred G. Aandahl	116,672	68.88%	Won ✓
1948	Fred G. Aandahl	131,764	61.33%	Won ✓
1950	Norman Brunsdale	121,822	66.29%	Won ✓
1952	Norman Brunsdale	199,944	78.74%	Won ✓
1954	Norman Brunsdale	124,253	64.21%	Won ✓
1956	John E. Davis	147,566	58.46%	Won ✓
1958	John E. Davis	111,836	53.10%	Won ✓
1960	Clarence P. Dahl	122,486	44.48%	Lost ✗
1962	Mark Andrews	113,251	49.56%	Lost ✗
1964	Donald M. Halcrow	116,247	44.26%	Lost ✗
1968	Robert P. McCarney	108,382	43.70%	Lost ✗
1972	Richard F. Larsen	138,032	48.96%	Lost ✗
1976	Richard Elkin/Ernest G. Pyle	138,321	46.53%	Lost ✗
1980	Allen I. Olson/Ernest Sands	162,230	53.61%	Won ✓
1984	Allen I. Olson/Ernest Sands	140,460	44.68%	Lost ✗
1988	Leon Mallberg/Donna Nalewaja	119,986	40.12%	Lost ✗
1992	Ed Schafer/Rosemarie Myrdal	176,398	57.86%	Won ✓
1996	Ed Schafer/Rosemarie Myrdal	174,937	66.19%	Won ✓
2000	John Hoeven/Jack Dalrymple	159,255	55.03%	Won ✓
2004	John Hoeven/Jack Dalrymple	220,803	71.26%	Won ✓
2008	John Hoeven/Jack Dalrymple	235,009	74.44%	Won ✓
2012	Jack Dalrymple/Drew Wrigley	200,525	63.10%	Won ✓
2016	Doug Burgum/Brent Sanford	259,863	76.52%	Won ✓
2020	Doug Burgum/Brent Sanford	235,479	65.84%	Won ✓
2024	Kelly Armstrong/Michelle Strinden	247,056	68.26%	Won ✓

== See also ==
- List of political parties in North Dakota
- North Dakota Democratic-NPL Party - North Dakota affiliate of the Democratic Party
- Political party strength in North Dakota
- Politics of North Dakota
- Republican Party (United States)
