= Kelly Armstrong =

Governor of North Dakota since 2024

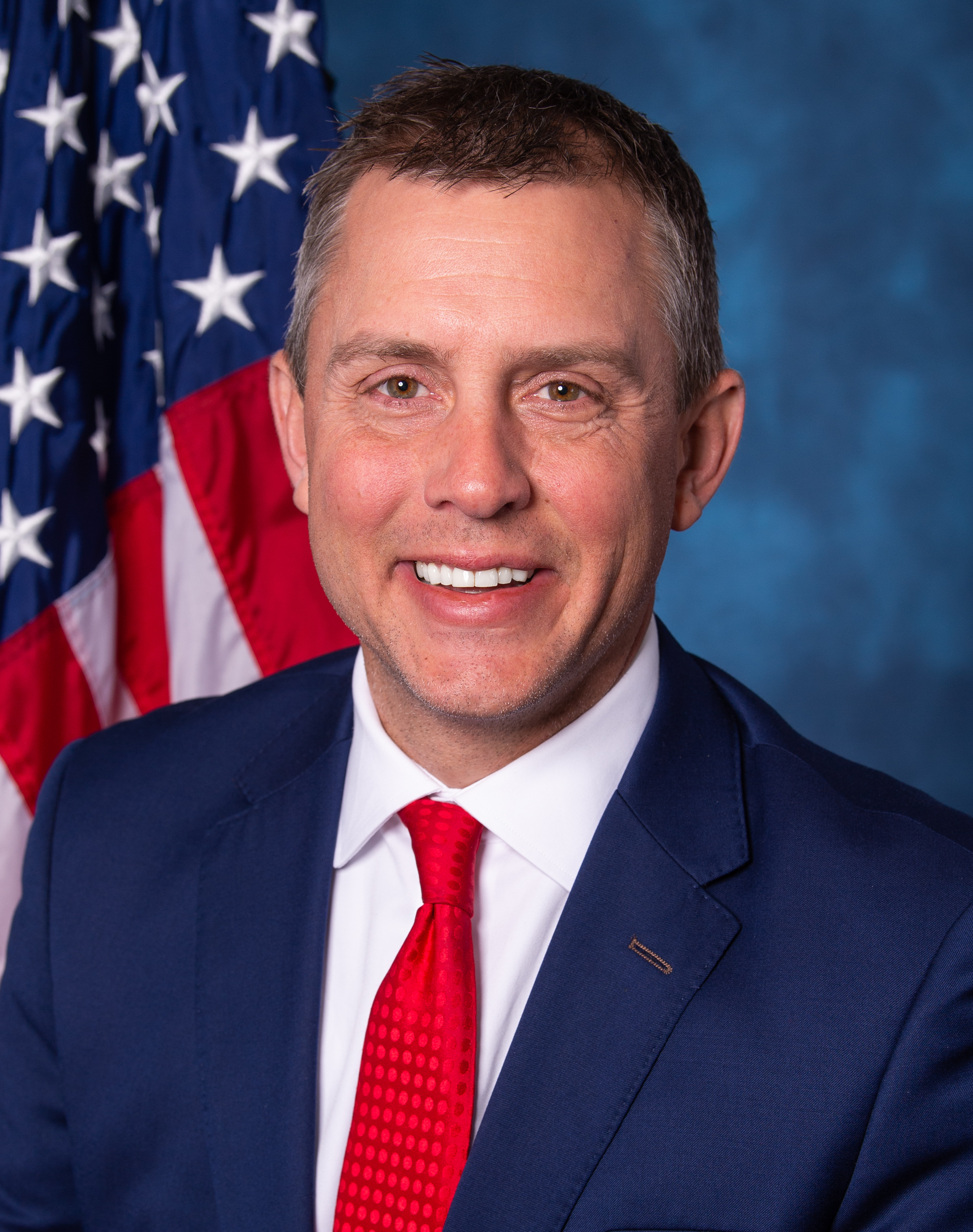
- Official portrait, 2018

34th Governor of North Dakota
- Incumbent
- Assumed office December 15, 2024
- Lieutenant: Michelle Strinden
- Preceded by: Doug Burgum

Member of the U.S. House of Representatives from North Dakota's at-large district
- In office January 3, 2019 – December 14, 2024
- Preceded by: Kevin Cramer
- Succeeded by: Julie Fedorchak

Chair of the North Dakota Republican Party
- In office June 6, 2015 – February 20, 2018
- Preceded by: Robert Harms
- Succeeded by: Jim Poolman (acting)

Member of the North Dakota Senate from the 36th district
- In office December 1, 2012 – November 8, 2018
- Preceded by: George Nodland
- Succeeded by: Jay Elkin

Personal details
- Born: Kelly Michael Armstrong; October 8, 1976 (age 50) Dickinson, North Dakota, U.S.
- Party: Republican
- Spouse: Kjersti Høiby (m. 2004)
- Children: 2
- Education: University of North Dakota (BA, JD); College of William and Mary (attended)
- Website: Campaign website
- Armstrong's voice Armstrong opposing Supreme Court expansion Recorded July 13, 2022

Kelly Michael Armstrong (born October 8, 1976) is an American lawyer and politician serving since 2024 as the 34th governor of North Dakota. A member of the Republican Party, he served from 2019 to 2024 as the U.S. representative for North Dakota's at-large congressional district.

Born and raised in North Dakota, Armstrong served from 2012 to 2018 as the North Dakota state senator from the 36th district and was chair of the North Dakota Republican Party from 2015 to 2018. Armstrong was first elected to Congress in 2018, and reelected in 2020 and 2022. He was elected governor in 2024.

As of February 2026, according to Morning Consult, Armstrong was the ninth-most popular governor in the country, with an approval rating of 60%.

== Early life and education ==
Kelly Michael Armstrong was born on October 8, 1976. Armstrong graduated from Dickinson High School in 1995. He earned a Bachelor of Arts in psychology from the University of North Dakota in 2001 and a Juris Doctor from the University of North Dakota School of Law in 2003, after spending his first year of law school at the College of William & Mary. He is a member of the Sigma Chi fraternity.

== Career ==
Before his election to Congress, Armstrong was a partner at Reichert Armstrong, with offices in Grand Forks and Dickinson. He was vice president of Armstrong Corp.

Armstrong served from 2013 to 2018 as the North Dakota state senator from the 36th district and chaired the North Dakota Republican Party from 2015 to 2018.

== U.S. House of Representatives (2019-2024) ==
=== Elections ===
==== 2018 ====
In February 2018, Armstrong announced his candidacy for the United States House of Representatives. He was endorsed by the North Dakota Republican Party at its state party convention in April 2018. Armstrong won the November 6 election with 60.2% of the vote. He resigned his seat in the North Dakota Legislature on November 7 and took office in Congress in January 2019, replacing Kevin Cramer, who was elected to the United States Senate.

==== 2020 ====
Armstrong was reelected with 68.96% of the vote.

==== 2022 ====
Armstrong was reelected with 62.2% of the vote.

=== Tenure ===
Armstrong with Wab Kinew in 2024

Armstrong was one of a coalition of seven Republicans who did not support their colleagues' efforts to challenge the results of the 2020 presidential election on January 6, 2021. These seven signed a letter that, while giving credence to election fraud allegations made by President Donald Trump, said Congress did not have the authority to influence the election's outcome.

On July 19, 2022, Armstrong and 46 other Republican representatives voted for the Respect for Marriage Act, which would codify the right to same-sex marriage in federal law. Armstrong was nearly censured in a 26–28 vote during a state party meeting for his vote. In September 2022, Armstrong was one of 39 Republicans to vote for the Merger Filing Fee Modernization Act of 2022, an antitrust package that would crack down on corporations for anti-competitive behavior. On June 14, 2023, Armstrong voted to shelve the first censure bill against Adam Schiff, finding the $16 million fine excessive. Former president Donald Trump called for all 20 Republicans who voted against the bill to be "primaried". Armstrong supported the second attempt a week later when the fine was removed.

Armstrong voted to provide Israel with support following the 2023 Hamas attack on Israel. In November 2023, he voted against censuring Representative Rashida Tlaib on the grounds of antisemitism after her criticism of Israel. Later that month, he was picked to fill the vacancy on the House Judiciary Committee left by Mike Johnson's election as Speaker of the House. In December 2023, Armstrong joined 105 House Republicans in voting to expel George Santos after a House ethics committee concluded that he had broken federal law. On December 14, 2024, Armstrong submitted his letter of resignation from Congress effective at midnight that night in order to take office as governor of North Dakota the next day. He added: "It's been an honor. Time to go home."

=== Committee assignments ===
- Committee on Energy and Commerce (vice chair)
  - Subcommittee on Energy, Climate, and Grid Security
  - Subcommittee on Innovation, Data, and Commerce
  - Subcommittee on Oversight and Investigations
- Committee on the Judiciary
  - Subcommittee on Constitution, Civil Rights, and Civil Liberties
  - Subcommittee on Immigration and Citizenship
  - Subcommittee on Antitrust, Commercial, and Administrative Law
- Judiciary Select Subcommittee on the Weaponization of the Federal Government

=== Caucus memberships ===
- Republican Governance Group
- Friends of Norway Caucus (co-chair)
- Fire Services Caucus
- Bipartisan Mental Health & Substance Use Disorder Task Force
- Air Force Caucus
- Coal Caucus
- Rural Broadband Caucus
- Northern Border Caucus
- Northern Border Security Caucus
- National Guard and Reserve Caucus
- Caucus on Youth Sports
- Sportsmen's Caucus
- Republican Study Committee

== Governor of North Dakota (2024–present) ==
=== 2024 gubernatorial election ===
On January 23, 2024, Armstrong announced he would not run for reelection, instead opting to run for governor of North Dakota after incumbent Doug Burgum announced he would not run for a third term. He said he would focus on lower taxes, cutting regulations, and bolstering the state's workforce.

Election results for governor, 2024

Armstrong faced Lieutenant Governor Tammy Miller in the primary for the North Dakota Republican Party endorsement. Armstrong and Miller had an aggressive primary battle, with Armstrong the first to release attack ads. He was later criticized for releasing an ad calling Miller "Tall-Tale Tammy" in which he used Artificial Intelligence-generated sources. Armstrong was endorsed by Secretary of State Michael Howe and U.S. senator John Hoeven. Burgum endorsed Miller, saying North Dakota did not need a lawyer in the office. Armstrong won the primary and chose state representative Michelle Strinden as his running mate.

Armstrong defeated Democratic-NPL candidate Merrill Piepkorn and independent Michael Coachman in the general election with 68.3% of the vote. Piepkorn received 26% and Coachman 5.6%.

=== Tenure ===
In accordance with the North Dakota Constitution, Armstrong and Strinden took office as governor and lieutenant governor on December 15, 2024. One of Armstrong's first actions as governor was to fill the vacant seat on the North Dakota Public Service Commission left by his congressional successor, Julie Fedorchak. Armstrong chose commission staffer Jill Kringstad to fill the seat.

Before the beginning of the legislative session, Armstrong proposed a plan to eliminate property taxes in the state, which was first addressed publicly by the failed measure 4 ballot in 2024. The plan involved using money from the Legacy Fund to cover the cost of primary residence property taxes, more tax credits for seniors and people with disabilities, and a 3% cap on increases to any property tax. Armstrong testified before the house finance and taxation committee in support of his plan, put into legislation by Representative Mike Nathe. On February 18, 2025, Armstrong signed into law the primary residence portion of the plan introduced by Senator Mark Weber. On May 3, Armstrong signed the rest of his plan into law.

Armstrong received backlash for ordering flags to be flown at full staff on inauguration day after President Joe Biden ordered all flags at half staff in observance of Jimmy Carter's death. Armstrong said the flag will return to half staff after the inauguration.

On April 7, 2025, Armstrong and South Dakota governor Larry Rhoden held a meeting with the leadership of the Standing Rock Sioux Reservation over concerns about federal funding and economic development. At the meeting, Armstrong told the tribe that when it comes to their issues, "When disruption happens, we need to know." Later in the month, Armstrong vetoed a controversial bill that would have forced public libraries to ban explicit content. Of the veto, he said, "I don't pretend to know what the next literary masterpiece is going to be, but I know that I want it available in a library." On June 14, the NDGOP censured Armstrong over the veto.

On June 21, 2025, Armstrong declared a state of emergency and began recovery efforts after numerous tornadoes hit the state the previous night. He specifically outlined the severe damage in Enderlin, which killed three people. Armstrong later requested a presidential disaster declaration over the damage. In August, Armstrong made another disaster declaration request due to storms that damaged infrastructure across the state, which was approved later in October.

During the 2025 United States federal government shutdown, Armstrong unveiled a plan that would give low-interest loans to North Dakota's federal workers in place of their usual pay, which the state industrial commission approved. He was praised for the idea, along with an idea to direct around $1.5 million to food assistance when the shutdown threatened SNAP benefits. Also during the shutdown, Armstrong appointed Levi Bachmeier as Superintendent of Public Instruction, as the incumbent, Kirsten Baesler, was confirmed by the Senate for a federal position.

During the 2026 North Dakota elections, Armstrong endorsed and donated thousands of dollars to candidates who supported his property tax plan and those who were in races against populist candidates, particularly in House and Senate races. Armstrong received criticism from the right for his endorsements and donations. Armstrong's coalition had considerable success in the election, with 19 of his 20 candidates winning their elections by either ousting incumbent populists or defeating challengers.

== Political positions ==
=== Abortion ===
Armstrong supports a ban on abortion. During a debate against Cara Mund in 2022, Armstrong said he supported the 2022 U.S. Supreme Court decision Dobbs v. Jackson Women's Health Organization that overturned the right to abortion set forth in Roe v. Wade (1973). He also said he does not support a federal abortion ban.

=== Education ===
Despite voicing support for school choice, Armstrong vetoed a bill that would have created special educational savings accounts for private school students, but did sign a bill to lay the groundwork for the state to have charter schools.

=== Election integrity ===
Armstrong was one of seven Republicans who did not support their colleagues' efforts to challenge the results of the 2020 presidential election on January 6, 2021. These seven signed a letter that, while giving credence to election fraud allegations made by President Donald Trump, said Congress did not have the authority to influence the election's outcome.

Armstrong was generally critical of a ballot measure that would require all ballots to be counted by hand and on paper, saying, "I don't think you can get it done. And, it turns out, it's less accurate."

=== Federal government ===
Armstrong defended the Department of Government Efficiency's federal funding freezes and firings. He said the media was stoking fear about DOGE and that he had not heard "a ton" of concerns from North Dakotans. Armstrong also defended the Big Beautiful Bill.

=== Gun rights ===
Armstrong said he does not support most gun control legislation, and that he would not support a ban on binary triggers like those used in the 2023 shooting of Fargo police officers.

Armstrong is an avid hunter.

=== Healthcare ===
On April 20, 2025, Armstrong signed a bill into state law capping the price of insulin at $25 per month.

=== LGBT rights ===
In 2022, Armstrong was one of 47 Republicans who went against the party and voted for the Respect for Marriage Act, which codified the right to same-sex marriage into federal law.

During a debate with Merrill Piepkorn in 2024, Armstrong said there is a difference between gender identity and biology and that he does not support transgender students playing on sports teams that align with their gender identity. But, he added, "Dress however you want. Be who you want to be. This country is a fantastic, weird place, and I think it is great."

In 2025, Armstrong signed into law a bill that reinforces North Dakota's ban on gender-neutral bathrooms in K-12 schools and requires schools to inform parents if they learn a child is identifying as transgender.

=== Taxes ===
Besides his property tax reform plan, Armstrong publicly opposed Measure 4 in 2024, which would have eliminated state and local governments' power to levy property tax. One PAC associated with Armstrong funneled thousands of dollars into anti-measure 4 efforts.

In March 2025, Armstrong vetoed a bill that would have established a prison industries workforce development tax credit, saying, "Any tax policy that creates this type of carve-out must be tied to a significant outcome that benefits the state's economic interests. This bill does not do that."

== Personal life ==
Armstrong met his wife Kjersti, a Norwegian citizen, while the two were at University of North Dakota. They married in 2004 and have two children. Kjersti became a dual U.S. citizen in 2021.

Armstrong has played, coached, and expressed his love of baseball. His inaugural gala was themed around the sport.

== Electoral history ==
Republican primary results
Party	Candidate	Votes	%
Republican	Kelly Armstrong	37,054	56.23
Republican	Tom Campbell (withdrawn)	17,692	26.85
Republican	Tiffany Abentroth	5,877	8.92
Republican	Paul Schaffner	5,203	7.90
Republican	Write-Ins	75	0.11
Total votes		65,901	100.00

2018 North Dakota's at-large congressional district election
Party	Candidate	Votes	%	±%
Republican	Kelly Armstrong	193,568	60.20%	−8.93%
Democratic–NPL	Mac Schneider	114,377	35.57%	+11.82%
Independent	Charles Tuttle	13,066	4.06%	N/A
Write-in		521	0.16%	N/A
Total votes		321,532	100.00%	
Republican hold				

2020 North Dakota's at-large congressional district election
Party	Candidate	Votes	%	±%
Republican	Kelly Armstrong (incumbent)	245,229	68.96%	+8.76%
Democratic–NPL	Zach Raknerud	97,970	27.55%	−8.02%
Libertarian	Steven Peterson	12,024	3.38%	N/A
Write-in		375	0.11%	-0.05%
Total votes		355,598	100.00%	
Republican hold				

2022 North Dakota's at-large congressional district election
Party	Candidate	Votes	%	±%
Republican	Kelly Armstrong (incumbent)	148,399	62.20%	–6.76
Independent	Cara Mund	89,644	37.57%	N/A
Write-in		543	0.23%	+0.12
Total votes		238,586	100.00%	
Republican hold				

2024 North Dakota Republican gubernatorial primary election
Party	Candidate	Votes	%
Republican	Kelly Armstrong Michelle Strinden	67,704	73.2%
Republican	Tammy Miller Josh Teigen	24,784	26.8%
Total votes		92,488	100.00

2024 North Dakota gubernatorial election
Party	Candidate	Votes	%	±%
Republican	Kelly Armstrong Michelle Strinden	247,056	68.26%	+2.42%
Democratic–NPL	Merrill Piepkorn Patrick Hart	94,043	25.98%	+0.60%
Independent	Michael Coachman Lydia Gessele	20,322	5.61%	N/A
Write-in		530	0.15%	-4.75%
Total votes		361,951	100.00%	N/A
Republican hold				

North Dakota Senate
Preceded by George Nodland	Member from the 36th district 2012–2018	Succeeded by Jay Elkin
Party political offices
Preceded by Robert Harms	Chair of the North Dakota Republican Party; 2015–2018	Succeeded by Jim Poolman; Acting
Preceded by Doug Burgum	Republican nominee for Governor of North Dakota; 2024	Most recent
U.S. House of Representatives
Preceded by Kevin Cramer	Member from North Dakota's at-large congressional district 2019–2024	Succeeded by Julie Fedorchak
Political offices
Preceded by Doug Burgum	Governor of North Dakota; 2024–present	Incumbent
U.S. order of precedence (ceremonial)
Preceded by JD Vance as Vice President	Order of precedence of the United States; Within North Dakota	Succeeded by Mayor of city in which event is held
Preceded by JD Vance as Vice President	Order of precedence of the United States; Within North Dakota	Succeeded by Otherwise Mike Johnson as Speaker of the House
Preceded by Jared Polis as Governor of Colorado	Order of precedence of the United States; Outside North Dakota	Succeeded by Larry Rhoden as Governor of South Dakota
