= North Dakota Public Service Commission =

State agency in North Dakota, US

The North Dakota Public Service Commission is a constitutional agency that maintains various degrees of statutory authority over utilities, telecommunications, railroads, grain elevators, pipeline safety, and other functions in North Dakota.

During the Dakota Territory era, the territorial government established a Board of Railroad Commissioners in 1885 to oversee railroads, sleeping car companies, and express (railroad shipping) companies. When Dakota Territory was divided in 1889, this commission was divided into the North Dakota Board of Railroad Commissioners and the South Dakota Board of Railroad Commissioners. The North Dakota board gained oversight of telephone companies within the state in 1915. This oversight was extended in 1919 to cover all other public utilities (water, gas, steam heat, and electricity). The three commissioners were originally elected to two-year terms, but this was changed in 1926 to staggered six-year terms. To reflect the expansion of oversight beyond the railroads, the commission was recreated as the North Dakota Public Service Commission in 1940. All three commissioner positions are at-large positions, each with a specific oversight portfolio based on their experience.

== Current public service commissioners ==
All three of the current public service commissioners are from the North Dakota Republican Party.

Name	Since	Next Election	Party
Sheri Haugen-Hoffart	February 11, 2022 (appointed)	2026	Republican
Jill Kringstad	January 6, 2025 (appointed)	2026 (special)	Republican
Randy Christmann	January 15, 2013	2030	Republican

=== Sheri Haugen-Hoffart ===
Sheri Haugen-Hoffart was appointed to the office by Governor Doug Burgum in January 2022. She previously served on multiple boards.

=== Jill Kringstad ===
Jill Kringstad was appointed to the commission in 2025 by Governor Kelly Armstrong. She was previously a staff member for the commission.

=== Randy Christmann ===
Randy Christmann was elected to the commission in 2012. He previously had a long career in the North Dakota Senate.

== See also ==
- List of North Dakota public service commissioners
