= 2026 North Dakota Superintendent of Public Instruction special election =

- November 3, 2026
Nominee	Levi Bachmeier	Tracy Layne Foss
Incumbent Superintendent
Levi Bachmeier

A special election is scheduled to be held in the U.S. State of North Dakota on November 3, 2026 to elect the North Dakota Superintendent of Public Instruction to an unexpired two-year term. A top-two primary election was held on June 9, 2026.

The winner will complete the term won in 2024 by Kirsten Baesler, who resigned in 2025 to become Assistant Secretary of Education for Elementary and Secondary Education. Incumbent appointee Superintendent Levi Bachmeier, who was appointed in this position by governor Kelly Armstrong, is running in this election.

== Candidates ==
The Superintendent of Public Instruction election in North Dakota is officially nonpartisan. The parties below identify which party label each candidate would have run under if given the option.

=== Advanced to general ===
- Levi Bachmeier (Republican), incumbent superintendent
- Tracy Layne Foss (Democratic), teacher at Valley Middle School

=== Eliminated in primary ===
- Charles Tuttle (Republican), activist and perennial candidate

== Primary election ==
=== Endorsements ===
Tracy Layne Foss (D)

Political parties

- North Dakota Democratic–Nonpartisan League Party
Declined to endorse

Political parties

- North Dakota Republican Party

=== Results ===
Primary results by county: Bachmeier: 30–40%; 40–50%; 50–60%; 60–70%; 70–80%; 80–90%; Foss: 40–50%

Primary election results
Candidate	Votes	%
Levi Bachmeier (incumbent)	59,323	55.5
Tracy Layne Foss	31,915	29.9
Charles Tuttle	15,353	14.4
Write-in	297	0.3
Total votes	106,884	100.0
