= List of Department of Education appointments by Donald Trump =

Key
Appointees serving in offices that did not require Senate confirmation.
Appointees confirmed by the Senate who are currently serving or served through the entire term.
Appointees awaiting Senate confirmation.
Appointees serving in an acting capacity.
Appointees who have left office after confirmation or offices which have been disbanded.
Nominees who were withdrawn prior to being confirmed or assuming office.

== Appointments (first administration) ==
Office	Nominee	Assumed office	Left office
Secretary of Education	Betsy DeVos	February 7, 2017 (Confirmed February 7, 2017, 51*–50); *Vice President Pence provided the tie-breaking vote.	January 8, 2021
Deputy Secretary of Education	Mick Zais	May 17, 2018 (Confirmed May 16, 2018, 50–48)	January 20, 2021
Under Secretary of Education	Diane Auer Jones	February 2018	January 2021
Office of the Secretary
General Counsel	Carlos G. Muñiz	April 23, 2018 (Confirmed April 18, 2018, 55–43)	January 24, 2019
Assistant Secretary of Education (Civil Rights)	Kenneth L. Marcus	August 6, 2018 (Confirmed June 7, 2018, 50–46)	July 31, 2020
Assistant Secretary of Education (Legislation and Congressional Affairs)	Peter Oppenheim	December 1, 2017 (Confirmed August 3, 2017, voice vote)	June 12, 2019
Assistant Secretary of Education (Planning, Evaluation, and Policy Development)	James Blew	August 13, 2018 (Confirmed July 17, 2018, 50–49)	January 20, 2021
Assistant Secretary of Education (Communications and Outreach)	Vacant		
Chief Financial Officer of Education	Douglas Webster	January 9, 2018 (Confirmed December 21, 2017, voice vote)	December 2018
Director of the Institute of Education Sciences	Mark Schneider	April 16, 2018 (Confirmed March 22, 2018, voice vote)	March 28, 2024
Commissioner of Education Statistics	Lynn Woodworth	April 10, 2018 (Appointed January 4, 2018)	June 20, 2021
Inspector General of the Department of Education	Andrew A. De Mello	Nomination lapsed and returned to the President on January 3, 2021	
Office of the Deputy Secretary
Assistant Secretary of Education (Elementary and Secondary Education)	Frank Brogan	June 26, 2018 (Confirmed June 25, 2018, voice vote)	January 20, 2021
Executive Director of the White House Initiative on Asian Americans and Pacific Islanders	Tina Wei Smith	December 2019	January 20, 2021
Executive Director of the White House Initiative on Asian Americans and Pacific Islanders	Holly Ham	January 3, 2018 (Appointed November 30, 2017)	October 26, 2019
Assistant Deputy Secretary of Education (English Language Acquisition) and Director of the Office of English Language Acquisition	Lorena Orozco McElwain	2020	January 2021
Assistant Deputy Secretary of Education (English Language Acquisition) and Director of the Office of English Language Acquisition	José A. Viana	May 1, 2017 (Appointed April 12, 2017)	December 1, 2019
Assistant Secretary of Education (Special Education and Rehabilitative Services)
Assistant Secretary of Education (Special Education and Rehabilitative Services)	Mark Schultz	June 1, 2020	January 20, 2021
Assistant Secretary of Education (Special Education and Rehabilitative Services)	Johnny W. Collett	December 2017 (Confirmed December 21, 2017, voice vote)	October 2019
Commissioner of the Rehabilitation Services Administration	Mark Schultz	August 2019 (Confirmed August 1, 2019, voice vote)	January 20, 2021
Office of the Under Secretary
Assistant Secretary of Education (Postsecondary Education)	Robert L. King	August 22, 2019 (Confirmed July 11, 2019, 56–37)	January 20, 2021
Assistant Secretary of Education (Career, Technical, and Adult Education)	Scott Stump	August 31, 2018 (Confirmed July 16, 2018, 85–0)	January 20, 2021
Assistant Secretary of Education (Career, Technical, and Adult Education)	Tim Kelly	Nomination withdrawn by the President on November 14, 2017	
Chief Operating Officer of Federal Student Aid	Mark A. Brown	October 2018	March 7, 2021

== Appointments (second administration) ==
Office	Nominee	Assumed office	Left office
Secretary of Education	Linda McMahon	March 3, 2025 (Confirmed March 3, 2025, 51–45)	
Secretary of Education	Denise L. Carter	January 20, 2025	March 3, 2025
Deputy Secretary of Education	Penny Schwinn	Nomination withdrawn by the President on September 3, 2025	
Under Secretary of Education	Nicholas Kent	August 4, 2025 (Confirmed August 1, 2025, 50–45)	
General Counsel of Education	Jennifer Mascott	Nomination withdrawn by the President on September 2, 2025	
Inspector General of the Department of Education	Mark Priebe	Awaiting Senate Confirmation	
Inspector General of the Department of Education	Heidi Semann	Nomination withdrawn by the President on September 17, 2026	
Assistant Secretary of Education for Civil Rights	Kimberly Richey	November 13, 2025 (Confirmed* October 7, 2025, 51–47); *En bloc confirmation of 107 nominees.	
Assistant Secretary of Education for Legislation and Congressional Affairs	Mary Riley	October 23, 2025 (Confirmed* October 7, 2025, 51–47); *En bloc confirmation of 107 nominees.	
Assistant Secretary of Education for Elementary and Secondary Education	Kirsten Baesler	November 24, 2025 (Confirmed* October 7, 2025, 51–47); *En bloc confirmation of 107 nominees.	
Assistant Secretary of Education for Postsecondary Education	David R. Barker	October 20, 2025 (Confirmed* October 7, 2025, 51–47); *En bloc confirmation of 107 nominees.	
Assistant Secretary of Education for Career, Technical, and Adult Education	Kevin O'Farrell	Nomination withdrawn by the President on October 21, 2025	

== Notes ==
=== Confirmation votes ===
Confirmations by roll call vote (first administration)

Confirmations by voice vote (first administration)

Confirmations by roll call vote (second administration)

Confirmations by voice vote (second administration)
