= COVID-19 pandemic in North Dakota =

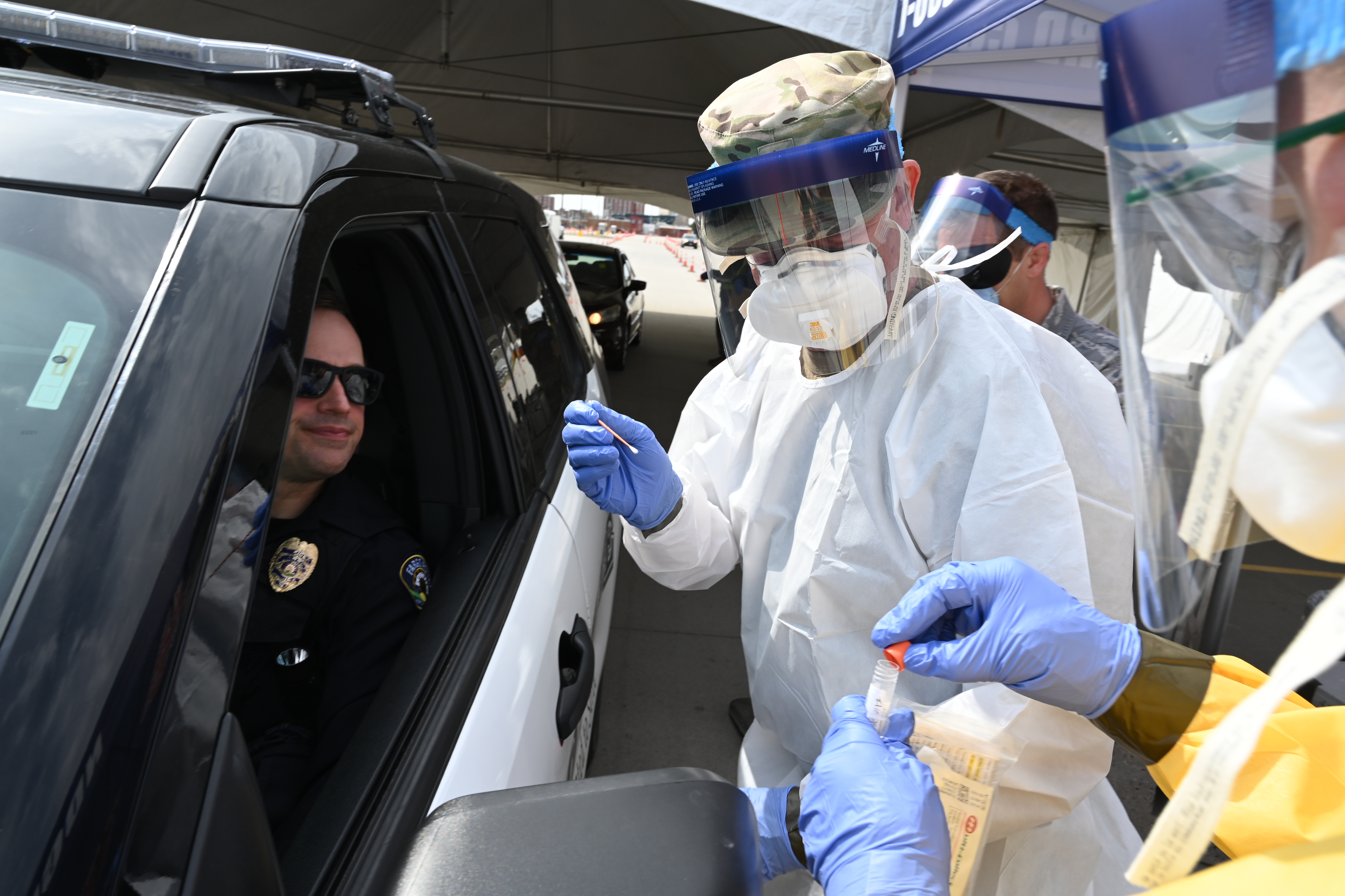
- COVID-19 testing in Fargo
- Disease: COVID-19
- Pathogen: SARS-CoV-2
- Location: North Dakota
- Index case: Ward County
- Arrival date: March 11, 2020
- Confirmed cases: 100,757 (March 11)
- Hospitalized cases: 3,561 (cumulative); 92 (current)
- Recovered: 89,582
- Deaths: 1,485

Government website
- www.health.nd.gov/coronavirus

The COVID-19 pandemic in North Dakota is an ongoing viral pandemic of coronavirus disease 2019 (COVID-19), a novel infectious disease caused by severe acute respiratory syndrome coronavirus 2 (SARS-CoV-2). The state reported its first case on March 11, 2020.

Out of the 49 counties with positive cases of COVID-19 in North Dakota, Burleigh and Cass lead the state for highest number of positive COVID-19 cases, with Burleigh totaling 13,695 and Cass county with 19,969. In October 2020, North Dakota had the highest rate of COVID-19 cases of any U.S. state or nation in the world, although this had been attributed in part to extensive testing.

North Dakota had early success in 2021 administering COVID-19 shots, but as of September 4, North Dakota ranked 45th among the 50 U.S. states in the proportion of fully vaccinated residents.

== Timeline ==
=== March 2020 ===
On March 11, the state's first case of COVID-19 was confirmed in Ward County. Governor Doug Burgum declared a state of emergency on March 13, stating that the government would follow guidance issued by the CDC, and did not have plans to immediately close schools. That day, the Standing Rock Sioux and Turtle Mountain Band of Chippewa tribes began restricting access to their reservations. On March 15, Governor Burgum announced that K-12 schools would be closed for at least a week from March 16–20 as a cautionary measure.

On March 17, the state government confirmed four more cases, including two in Burleigh County, one in Cass County, and one in Ward County, for a total of five in the state. All five were people who had recently traveled outside North Dakota. On March 18, the state confirmed two new COVID-19 cases had emerged from Morton County which were the first confirmed cases of community spread in the state. On March 19, eight new cases were confirmed in Burleigh and Morton counties. On March 20, 11 new cases were confirmed in Ramsey, Morton, Burleigh, and Pierce counties.

On March 21, Burgum signed an executive order to allow COVID-19 testing to be conducted at pharmacies, and to provide emergency refills of prescriptions. On March 25, an executive order was issued to expand worker's compensation coverage to first responders and health care providers who contract COVID-19. Burgum announced that the state received a total of 11,700 unemployment claims in the past week.

On March 27, North Dakota reported its first death related to COVID-19, involving a man in his 90's from Cass County with underlying health conditions. On March 29, Governor Burgum requested a major disaster declaration from the federal government.

=== April–July 2020 ===
By April 1, the state had recorded 159 positive cases and three deaths in total. On April 3, the state received $34 million in funding from the Federal Transit Administration to ensure that state transportation would continue to function safely during the COVID-19 pandemic. North Dakota received $18 million from the CARES Act with cities like Fargo getting $8 million, Bismarck getting $3.7 million, and Grand Forks receiving $3.4 million. Tribes also received grant funding with Standing Rock obtaining $369,000 and Turtle Mountain Band of Chippewa receiving $191,000. Burgum also announced a pilot program for drive-through testing.

On April 6, the state reported its fourth death. By April 9, this had increased to six. On April 18, North Dakota reported 90 new cases, with 68 in Grand Forks; an outbreak had been confirmed at the LM Wind Power manufacturing plant in Grand Forks. On April 28, Governor Burgum announced that the state would begin to lift some of the business closures it had implemented in March, under its "Smart Restart" system.

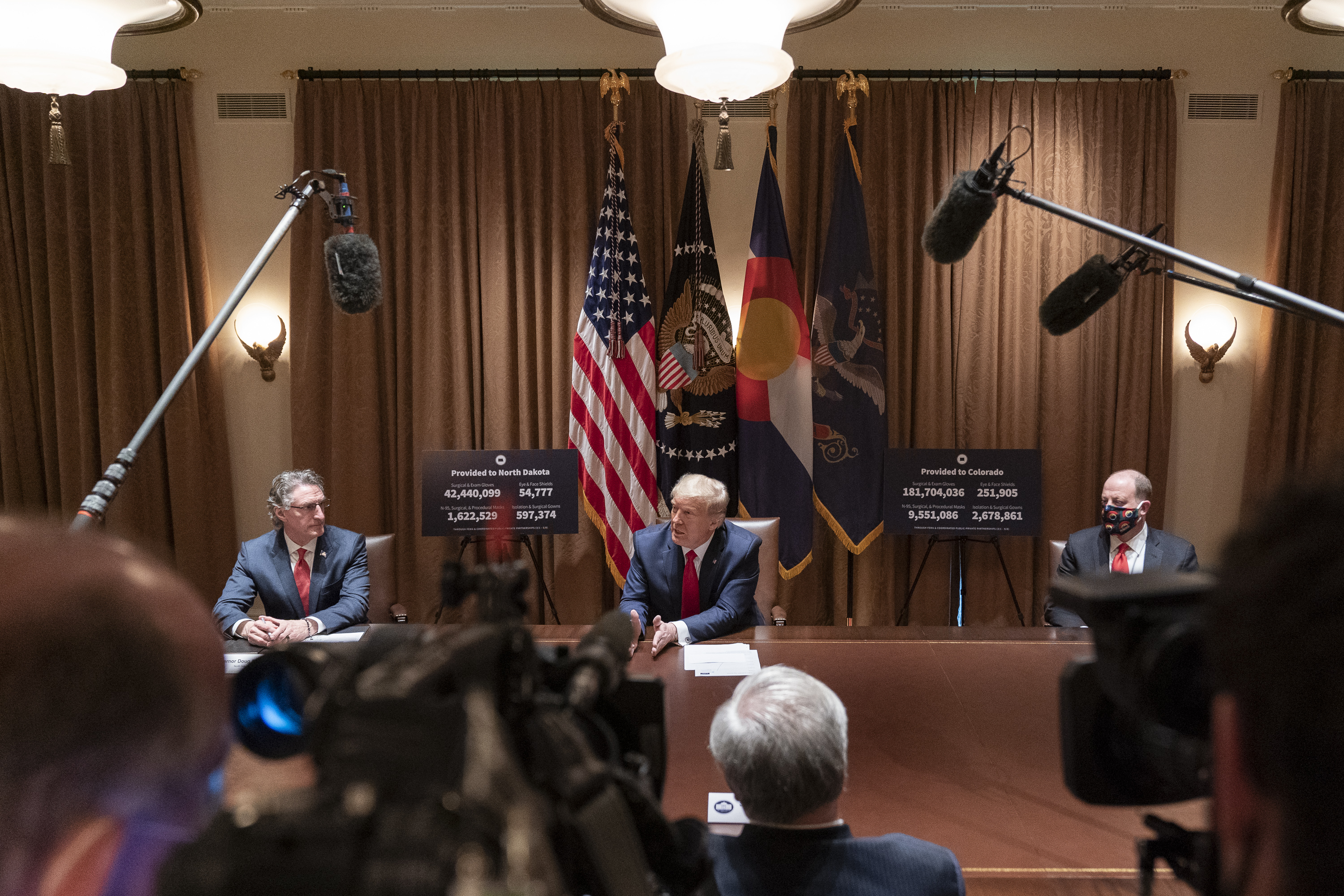
Governor Burgum of North Dakota (left) meeting with President Trump along with Colorado Governor Polis (right) on COVID-19

On May 29, Governor Burgum announced that the state had reached the "Low" (green) tier according to the Smart Restart guidance, allowing it to further loosen some of the capacity restrictions placed on reopened businesses via the Smart Restart guidance. Burgum cited a high testing rate and low number of active cases. On June 16, Governor Burgum stated that North Dakota's testing capacity had outgrown demand for testing. On June 18, North Dakota recorded its 75th COVID-19 death, however overall active cases in the state continued trending downwards.

On June 23, Governor Burgum stated that several counties were close to reaching the lowest "New normal" (blue) level on the Smart Restart system, noting the less than one percent positivity rate of COVID-19 in North Dakota.

By July 28, a McKenzie county woman in her 20s marked the 100th cumulative COVID-19 death in North Dakota. On July 30, the Spirit Lake reservation began to mandate the wearing of face masks in public.

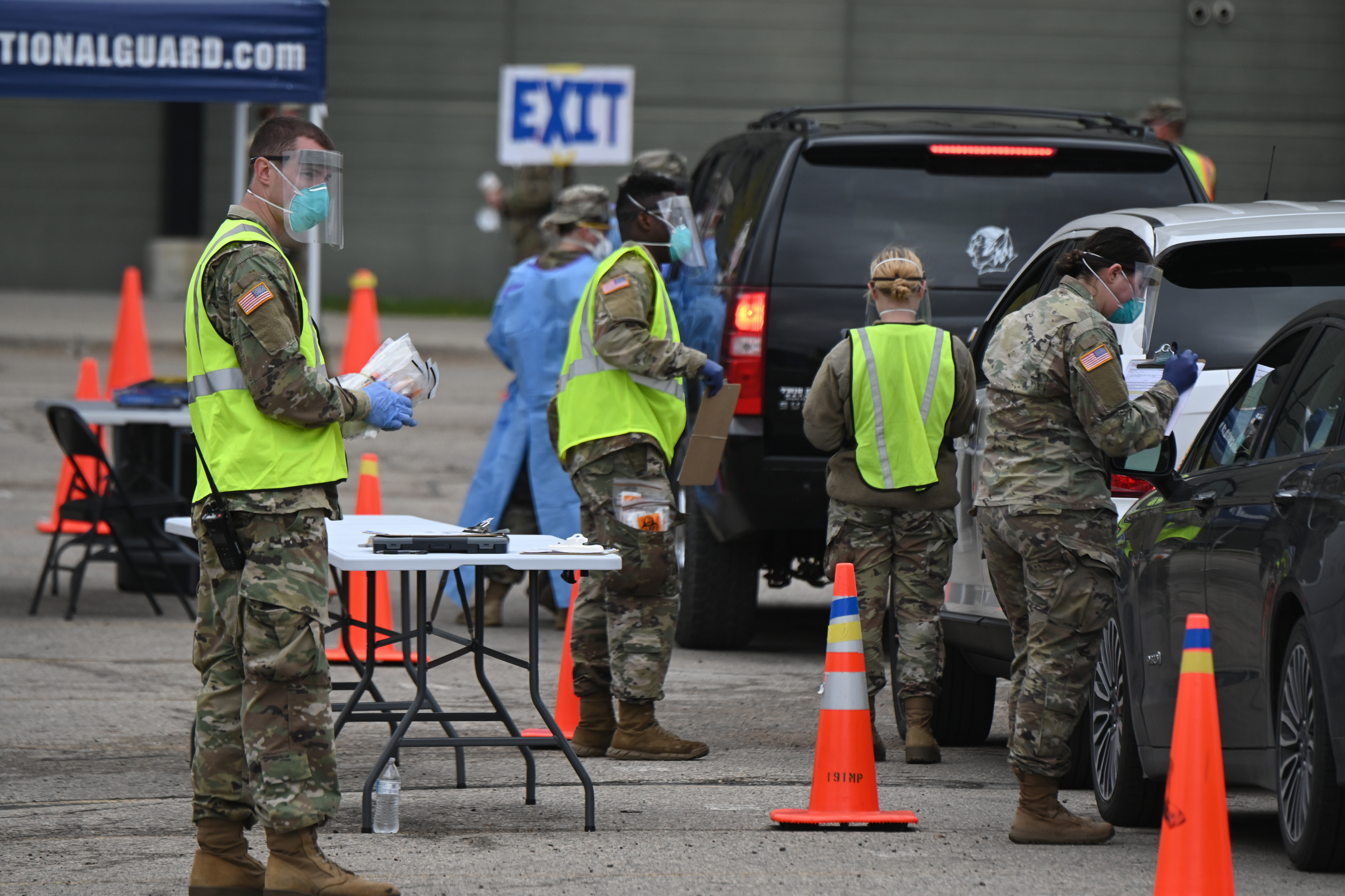
North Dakotans at drive thru COVID-19 testing site

=== August 2020 ===
On August 19, it was announced that interim state health officer Andrew Stahl (who had succeeded Mylynn Tufte following her May 27 departure) would resign. This came amid disagreements with the office of the Governor over aspects of North Dakota's COVID-19 response, including the risk level system and mandating face masks.

On August 20, the Bismarck Police Department cancelled the Tri-City Community Picnic and a Citizen's Police Academy event due to rising COVID-19 cases in the area. On August 24, North Dakota crossed 10,000 cumulative positive cases of coronavirus. 58 percent of those testing positive for COVID-19 were under 40 years of age.

=== September 2020 ===
By the beginning of September, 1 out of every 4 North Dakotans had been tested for COVID-19. The positivity rate for the virus was the highest among persons that were 20 to 29 years of age.

On September 3, North Dakota held onto the most COVID-19 cases per capita in the United States for the past two weeks, according to figures by Johns Hopkins University Center. On September 4, following the recommendation from the Burleigh-Morton COVID-19 task force, local governments agreed to hold discussions on possible mask mandates following the jump in cases in the counties.

By September 5, North Dakota passed 13,000 cumulative cases of COVID-19. On September 8, the state had 2,220 active cases of the virus and passed 14,000 cumulative cases. By September 12, the state had a positivity rate of 7 percent and passed 15,000 cumulative cases of the virus. Following promised discussions from September 4, Morton County soundly rejected a mask mandate, due to opposition from residents, despite the county reporting the highest number of active cases of COVID-19 in the state.

On September 15, North Dakota passed 16,000 cumulative cases of COVID-19 with over 13,000 recovering. On September 16, Mayor Bakken of Bismarck signed an extension of its coronavirus emergency declaration until mid October. An Associated Press report released found that a statewide educational campaign on the importance of masks and social distancing had not begun, despite receiving federal funds.

By September 18, North Dakota passed 17,000 cumulative cases of the virus and over 700 total hospitalizations, as well as passing 14,000 recoveries. Most of the cases were being reported in long-term care facilities, where the state government has called for additional volunteer staffing to handle surge.

On September 19, active cases in the state surpassed 3,000 for the first time. The Department of Health began a saliva testing pilot program with the University of North Dakota, Bismarck State College, and Fargo Public Health.

On September 23, deaths from COVID-19 in North Dakota exceeded 200. Governor Burgum raised the Smart Restart risk levels for a dozen counties throughout the state effective September 25. Burgum also announced that the state would prioritize testing and contact tracing involving long-term care facilities. Chris Jones, director of the Department of Human Services stated more than half the deaths reported in the state were coming from long-term care facilities.

By September 24, cumulative cases passed 19,000. On September 25, total recoveries passed 16,000. The interim State health officer Paul Mariani resigned after serving less than a month on the position, due to Governor Burgum rescinding a requirement for self-isolation after returning from travel, and breaking away from guidelines recommended by the CDC. Two area hospitals in Bismarck warned of nearing capacity and shortage of resources due to the further rise in cases.

By September 28, total recoveries passed 17,000. North Dakota had set a record high for active cases every day since September 21, with active cases rising from around 100 cases to 3,766. The spike is suspected to have been contributed in part by hundreds of thousands attending the Sturgis Motorcycle Rally in South Dakota from early August. On September 29, COVID-19 cases in the state passed 21,000. Grant County had its first confirmed death. It was noted by Bloomberg that the surge of cases in North Dakota was similar to that of Florida's from July.

Over the past month, North Dakota saw an 80 percent increase in COVID-19 cases as well as a doubling of the previous death toll record. Since June the state has seen a 600 percent increase in cases. Joshua Wynne, of the University of North Dakota, stated that recent trends were "disturbing and headed in the wrong direction".

=== October 2020 ===
By October 2, North Dakota passed 900 cumulative hospitalizations. On October 3, North Dakota exceeded 23,000 confirmed cases since the pandemic began. On October 6, cumulative deaths passed 300 after a reported 24 new deaths, however not all on same day due to lag in information reporting by the health department. The state also reported the youngest fatality, a 17-year-old Fort Berthold resident with underlying condition.

By October 10, the state passed 22,000 total recoveries. On October 11, North Dakota passed 27,000 cases. Renane Moch, the director of Bismarck-Burleigh Public Health, warned of the strain on the hospital system, with 241 inpatient and 32 ICU beds being available as of October 13 throughout the state.

On October 14, Governor Burgum announced that the Smart Restart plan would be updated effective October 16, with tightened restrictions on gatherings in higher risk areas. In addition, 16 counties would be raised to High (orange) on the Smart Restart system. On October 16, North Dakota broke 30,000 cumulative cases and 5,000 active cases throughout the state. State health officials submitted a first draft of a vaccine plan to the CDC, with a main goal of vaccinating 70 percent of the population and prioritizing vulnerable groups. On October 17, the state exceeded 400 deaths. By October 19, the state passed 26,000 recoveries and 32,000 cases of COVID-19, with more than one-third of active cases at 5,837 being in Burleigh and Cass counties.

On October 20, North Dakota logged over 1,000 new cases, bringing its overall total above 33,000. The daily positivity rate listed by state officials was at 19.68%. To alleviate a backlog in notifying those who had tested positive, it was announced that part of the North Dakota National Guard's resources would be shifted away from contact tracing, and that those who test positive would be instructed to identify and notify close contacts themselves. Over the previous week, North Dakota led the country in new cases and deaths per-capita; the Financial Times projected that North Dakota would have the most cases per-million residents worldwide if it were its own country.

On October 23, the state exceeded 29,000 recoveries. The state began to obtain 30,000 rapid testing kits. Governor Burgum announced that the state would refrain from reporting persons who had underlying conditions that died of COVID-19, as to not give residents "a false sense of security surrounding their risk." With a December 30 deadline to spend the funds distributed to North Dakota by the CARES Act, the state energy commission voted in favor of diverting $16 million to fund the oil industry with hydraulic fracturing operations, with the Legislative body expecting to take a final vote the following week.

On October 26, North Dakota exceeded 38,000 cases. The first meeting of North Dakota's COVID-19 Vaccination Ethics Committee was conducted, which would discuss how prospective COVID-19 vaccines would be distributed in the state. The committee would report to the state's COVID-19 Unified Command, which would make the final decisions on allocation of the vaccine. By October 28, Cass County alone had recorded over 8,000 cases to-date. On October 29, the state exceeded 40,000 confirmed cases. In a press briefing, Governor Burgum warned that North Dakota was headed towards a "challenging time", and considering it the beginning of a fall surge. On October 30, North Dakota exceeded 500 total deaths, and recorded a single-day record of 1,443 new cases.

In total, North Dakota saw a 112% increase in the number of active cases over the month, and it accounted for nearly half of all of North Dakota's total deaths to that point. From mid-October, the positivity rate had dropped by 4.45% to 15.23%.

=== November 2020 ===
In the 2020 North Dakota elections on November 3, David Andahl — who had died from COVID-19 complications on October 5 —posthumously won an election for a seat in the North Dakota House of Representatives. Since 2000, only five other candidates have won their elections posthumously in the United States.

After 1,540 new cases were reported on November 5, North Dakota exceeded 50,000 confirmed cases. On November 6, the state exceeded 600 deaths. The Department of Health reported that 1 in 15 residents of North Dakota had tested positive for COVID-19. The department also revealed the state's first confirmed case of multisystem inflammatory syndrome (MIS-C) in a child.

On November 9, Governor Burgum announced that all state hospitals were full, and that all counties would therefore be raised to level orange on the Smart Restart system. To alleviate health care staffing shortages, the Governor called for asymptomatic health care workers to continue to work in hospital systems' COVID-19 units and in nursing homes, and for the further implementation of surge plans. The North Dakota Nurses Association objected to the proposal, citing a potential decline in workers due to growing fatigue and inadvertently creating more avenues for the virus to spread. Two executive directors from the association renewed calls for a statewide mask mandate further public health measures before considering the proposed policy.

On November 13, Governor Burgum announced a series of new public health orders, including a state-wide mask mandate. On November 15, North Dakota exceeded 63,000 positive cases of COVID-19. On November 17, the Federation of American Scientists projected that North Dakota had the highest mortality rate from COVID-19 of any state or country nationwide, at 18.2 per 1 million residents. On November 19, Governor Burgum announced that 60 Air Force Nurses would be deployed to North Dakota per a request for more medical personnel from FEMA by November 21 to six different hospitals throughout four cities in the state. The North Dakota National Guard surpassed the record of personnel days worked in response to the 2011 Souris River flood, making the response to COVID-19 the largest and longest of the state's mobilization in the history.

By November 20, North Dakota had exceeded 70,000 cases and 800 deaths. On November 23, the Los Alamos National Laboratory (LANL) forecast that the state would 322–808 more COVID-19 deaths by December 30. On November 27, the state exceeded 900 deaths. On November 29, active cases of COVID-19 in the state dropped for a seventh day in a row below 7,000, however COVID-19 related hospitalizations continued to climb.

By the end of November, it was estimated that approximately 1 in 800 North Dakota residents had died from COVID-19.

=== December 2020 ===
Following three previous months of rising active cases, North Dakota saw near 50% drop in cases over the past several weeks. The drop in active cases was attributed to further mitigation efforts and mask mandates on the local and state level.

On December 5, North Dakota exceeded 1,000 deaths. The state was fourth-highest in new cases per-capita.

On December 9, Governor Burgum extended the November 13 orders, with continued occupancy restrictions lasting until January 8, 2021, and the mask mandate until January 18, 2021, citing the continued strain on the hospital system.

On December 13, North Dakota reported no coronavirus-related fatalities for the first time since September, with active cases of COVID-19 dropping below 3,000. On December 14, the state received the first initial doses of the Pfizer–BioNTech COVID-19 vaccine after being approved under an Emergency Use Authorization.

On December 17, North Dakota exceeded 1,200 deaths. By December 19, total COVID-19 cases in North Dakota exceeded 90,000.

On December 21, North Dakota health officials stated that contract tracing had become "more manageable" due to the decreasing infection rate, determining that it could restart full operations within the week after being halted in October.

=== January 2021 ===
On January 2, new data including coronavirus numbers from the New Year's Day holiday put North Dakota's death toll past 1,300 cumulatively.

By January 4, the state's rolling average was now 4.4%. Governor Burgum announced that the state-wide risk level would be lowered from orange to yellow ("Moderate") on January 8, allowing an easing of capacity limits on bars, restaurants, and event venues.

On January 15, Governor Burgum further announced that the state would drop its mask mandate and capacity restrictions for businesses on January 18, becoming guidelines no longer enforced as health orders. Burgum stated that active cases in the state had fallen by 80% since the strengthened measures were announced in November, and that the state's seven-day average was among the lowest nationwide.

=== February 2021 ===
By February 7, North Dakota had the most COVID-19 cases per capita.

=== March 2021 ===
On March 11, North Dakota commemorated the one-year anniversary of the first COVID-19 case being identified in the state.

=== April 2021 ===
On April 20, 2021, the Canadian province of Manitoba announced an agreement with North Dakota to open vaccination clinics on the United States border for Manitoba truck drivers entering the United States on assignment.

== Response ==
North Dakota's COVID-19 Unified Command team was initially led by state health officer Mylynn Tufte and North Dakota National Guard adjutant general Alan Dohrmann. Additional members include North Dakota University System Chancellor, Mark Hargerott, and State Superintendent, Kristen Baesler.

Following the state's first confirmed case, guidance was issued on the organization of events and gatherings based on three risk thresholds. The state also recommended that long-term care facilities limit visitors to immediate family for residents in critical or end-of-life care. On March 19, Governor Burgum ordered the closure of dine-in restaurants, cinemas and entertainment venues, and gyms. Access to state facilities was also limited.

On March 24, Governor Burgum issued an executive order halting in-person North Dakota Department of Transportation (NDDOT) administrative hearings and eliminated load restrictions on state highways. On March 26, Burgum expanded vote-by-mail flexibility by waiving the requirement to have in-person voting facilities for counties.

On March 27, personal care services were added to the previously issued executive order. On March 29, Burgum mandated that residents returning from travel outside of North Dakota must self-isolate for 14 days. On March 31, Burgum announced the establishment of the Workforce Coordination Center (WCC), which aimed to support the needs of emergency workforce that have been impacted by COVID-19.

On April 1, the executive order closing certain businesses was extended through April 20. Burgum also signed a new executive order waiving the one-week waiting period to access unemployment benefits to mitigate the impact of COVID-19 on individuals and household members who lost their jobs. On April 7, a formal executive order was issued to restrict visitation of long-term care homes.

=== Smart Restart ===
On April 28, Governor Burgum announced "Smart Restart" guidelines for reopening bars and restaurants beginning May 1, with capacity limited to 50%. On May 15, recommendations were issued for the reopening of arenas and event venues, with a capacity of up to 250 people.

On May 22, it was announced that entertainment venues, recreation facilities, and personal care services could reopen under Smart Restart guidelines, and that some state employees would return to on-site work.

On May 29, the state was downgraded from "Moderate" to "Low-risk" status on the Smart Restart plan, allowing restaurants and bars to expand to up to 75% capacity, event venues to expand to up to 75% capacity or 500 people, and cinemas to expand to 65%.

On June 9, the state approved a plan to allow 82 of its long-term care homes to begin lifting restrictions, including allowing outdoor visitation and limited indoor group activities.

On October 14, Governor Burgum announced that the Smart Restart plan would be updated effective October 16, with tightened restrictions on gatherings and business capacity in higher risk areas.

Amid a statewide surge, on November 13 Burgum announced new restrictions effective November 14, including requiring bars and restaurants to reduce their capacity to 50% and close from 10:00 p.m. to 4:00 a.m. nightly, reducing large venues to 25% of capacity, and suspending all high school winter sports and other extracurricular activities until December 14.

On December 21, the curfew for bars and restaurants was lifted due to a decrease in cases and hospitalization, but occupancy limits remained in force — having been extended through January 8.

On January 8, 2021, restrictions were eased to allow bars and restaurants to expand to 65% capacity or 200 patrons (whichever is lower), and event facilities to 50% capacity.

=== Face masks ===
During a press briefing on May 23, Governor Burgum appealed for residents to stop "shaming" others for wearing face masks in public, arguing that they were not a political issue, and that they may be doing so to help protect vulnerable family members.

In response to a heightened rate of new cases, on October 20 Mayor of Fargo Tim Mahoney utilized emergency powers to enact a citywide mask mandate. Minot also imposed a mandate through a vote by the city council voting in a (5–2) majority.

In an October 26 meeting with White House Coronavirus Response Coordinator Deborah Birx, Governor Burgum stated that he did not plan to mandate masks state-wide. Although he did not contest their effectiveness, Burgum argued that it was up to residents to decide whether they wanted to or not.

On November 13, Governor Burgum announced a state-wide mask mandate. Three local sheriffs announced that they would refuse to enforce the mandate.

On January 14, 2021, Republican House member Jeff Hoverson attempted to introduce a bill that would prohibit local mask mandates, or businesses from mandating masks in order to enter.

The mandate expired on January 18, 2021, with Governor Burgum citing a drop in active cases and hospitalizations. Some cities maintained mask mandates at a local level.

On February 22, 2021, the state House of Representatives advanced a bill 50–44 that would prohibit the adoption and enforcement of mask mandates by state and local officials, and anyone from mandating masks as "a condition for entry, education, employment, or services". Support of the bill cited allegations surrounding effectiveness of face masks, and claims that mask mandates were part of a larger conspiracy.

On April 7, the Senate passed an amended version of the bill, which would only prohibit the mandating of masks by state officials. The amended bill was passed by the House, but vetoed by Governor Burgum on April 21. However, the veto was overridden by the House, and the bill was therefore passed on April 22.

=== Care19 Alert and Care19 Diary ===
The state introduced an encounter logging app known as Care19, developed by ProudCrowd (which had developed a similar app for the North Dakota State Bison football team), which is designed to track locations where a person had been in order to assist with contact tracing. The app faced a mixed reception from users due to perceived inaccuracies in location logging, including primarily using Wi-Fi and cellular signal locations rather than GPS.

On May 20, North Dakota was one of the first states to commit to using the Bluetooth-based Exposure Notification System, which wirelessly logs encounters with other users of the app, and can inform them if they had been within proximity of someone who had later tested positive for COVID-19. Care19 Alert was released on August 13, 2020. It coexists with the existing Care19 app, which was renamed Care19 Diary.

=== Schools ===
On March 15, Governor Burgum announced that K-12 schools would be closed for a week from March 16–20 as a cautionary measure.

On March 19, Burgum extended the closure of schools through April 1, and asked schools to implement alternative learning plans. On March 30, Burgum allowed certain schools to provide child care services for the families of health care workers.

On May 11, it was announced that schools could re-open for optional summer programs beginning June 1.

=== Sports ===
The North Dakota High School Activities Association suspended all winter postseason tournaments on March 13.

== Misinformation ==
In April 2020, a false rumor spread that cases in Williams County were being under reported to avoid scaring off oil companies.

In September 2020, MedicareAdvantage.com found North Dakota ranked fifth in the U.S. when it came to Coronavirus conspiracy theories per the research study which looked at Google search trends.

== Statistics ==
COVID-19 pandemic medical cases in North Dakota by county
County (Note: County where individuals with a positive case reside. Location of diagnosis and treatment may vary.)	Cases (Note: Reported confirmed and probable cases. Actual case numbers are probably higher.)	Deaths	Recov.	Population (Note: July 2019 population estimate from "U.S. Census Bureau Quick Facts: North Dakota". United States Census Bureau.)	Cases / 100k
53 / 53	239,391	2,232	236,878	762,062	31,413.6
Adams	598	10	588	2,216	26,985.6
Barnes	2,958	47	2,910	10,415	28,401.3
Benson	1,965	23	1,941	6,832	28,761.7
Billings	142	1	141	928	15,301.7
Bottineau	1,583	26	1,556	6,282	25,199.0
Bowman	829	9	819	3,024	27,414.0
Burke	432	3	429	2,115	20,425.5
Burleigh	34,866	303	34,490	95,626	36,460.8
Cass	58,770	333	58,393	181,923	32,304.9
Cavalier	815	7	807	3,762	21,664.0
Dickey	1,481	39	1,439	4,872	30,398.2
Divide	455	4	451	2,264	20,097.2
Dunn	1,036	8	1,025	4,424	23,417.7
Eddy	756	6	750	2,287	33,056.4
Emmons	728	18	709	3,241	22,462.2
Foster	984	23	960	3,210	30,654.2
Golden Valley	475	4	471	1,761	26,973.3
Grand Forks	22,060	125	21,913	69,451	31,763.4
Grant	452	11	441	2,274	19,876.9
Griggs	569	2	566	2,231	25,504.3
Hettinger	831	8	821	2,499	33,253.3
Kidder	503	13	490	2,480	20,282.3
LaMoure	991	20	970	4,046	24,493.3
Logan	434	12	422	1,850	23,459.5
McHenry	1,300	31	1,268	5,745	22,628.4
McIntosh	685	9	672	2,497	27,432.9
McKenzie	3,261	25	3,232	15,024	21,705.3
McLean	2,721	49	2,667	9,450	28,793.7
Mercer	2,556	24	2,529	8,187	31,220.2
Morton	11,182	142	11,024	31,364	35,652.3
Mountrail	3,224	37	3,183	10,545	30,573.7
Nelson	757	18	739	2,879	26,293.9
Oliver	326	5	321	1,959	16,641.1
Pembina	1,962	16	1,946	6,801	28,848.7
Pierce	1,059	32	1,026	3,975	26,641.5
Ramsey	3,605	57	3,547	11,519	31,296.1
Ransom	1,484	28	1,456	5,218	28,440.0
Renville	549	15	533	2,327	23,592.6
Richland	4,041	23	4,018	16,177	24,979.9
Rolette	5,950	43	5,870	14,176	41,972.3
Sargent	1,009	9	998	3,898	25,885.1
Sheridan	295	7	288	1,315	22,433.5
Sioux	1,332	19	1,313	4,230	31,489.4
Slope	61	0	61	750	8,133.3
Stark	11,610	86	11,514	31,489	36,870.0
Steele	380	2	377	1,890	20,105.8
Stutsman	7,024	97	6,919	20,704	33,925.8
Towner	634	12	622	2,189	28,963.0
Traill	2,183	26	2,155	8,036	27,165.3
Walsh	3,339	34	3,303	10,641	31,378.6
Ward	20,686	251	20,425	67,641	30,582.0
Wells	1,011	12	997	3,834	26,369.3
Williams	10,452	68	10,373	37,589	27,806.0
Final update March 17, 2022, with data through the previous day Data is publicly reported by North Dakota Department of Health

== See also ==
- COVID-19 pandemic in South Dakota
- Timeline of the COVID-19 pandemic in the United States
- COVID-19 pandemic in the United States – for impact on the country
- COVID-19 pandemic – for impact on other countries
- COVID-19 pandemic in Dakota
