= United States Department of Education =

U.S. federal government department

Coordinates: 38°53′11.5″N 77°1′7.9″W

- Seal of the United States Department of Education

- Flag of the United States Department of Education

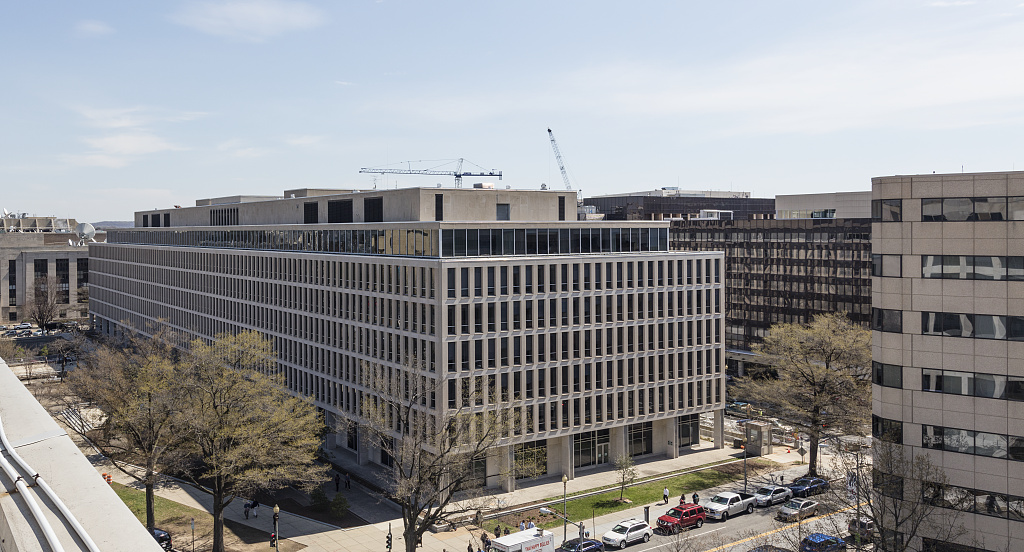
- Lyndon Baines Johnson Department of Education Building, Department Headquarters

Department overview
- Formed: October 17, 1979; 47 years ago
- Preceding agencies: Department of Health, Education, and Welfare; United States Office of Education
- Jurisdiction: Federal government of the United States
- Headquarters: Lyndon Baines Johnson Department of Education Building, 400 Maryland Avenue, Southwest, Washington, D.C., U.S. 20202
- Employees: 4,200 (2025)
- Annual budget: $238.04 billion (2024)
- Department executives: Linda McMahon, Secretary; Nicholas Kent, Acting Deputy Secretary
- Key document: Department of Education Organization Act
- Website: ed.gov

The United States Department of Education is a cabinet-level department of the United States government, originating in 1979. The department began operating on May 4, 1980, having been created after the Department of Health, Education, and Welfare was split into the Department of Education and the Department of Health and Human Services by the Department of Education Organization Act, which President Jimmy Carter signed into law on October 17, 1979. An earlier iteration was formed in 1867 but was quickly demoted to the Office of Education a year later. Since its official renaming, the department's official abbreviation is ED ("DOE" refers to the United States Department of Energy) but its name is also abbreviated informally as "DoEd".

The Department of Education is administered by the United States secretary of education. In 2021 it had more than 4,000 employees – the smallest staff of the Cabinet agencies – and a 2024 budget of $268 billion, up from $14 billion when it was established in 1979. In 2025, the department's budget was about four percent of the total US federal spending.

During Donald Trump's second term, the Department of Government Efficiency announced it would shrink the Department of Education's workforce by half, and Trump signed an executive order on March 20, 2025 aimed at closing the department to the maximum extent allowed by law. There are limits to how much can be done by executive action as significant parts of it are statutorily defined by Congress and signed into law by previous presidents. The presidential action was held off by a US district court in Boston on May 22, 2025, which the Trump administration appealed, and a federal appeals court declined to lift the injunction in early June. On July 14, 2025, the Supreme Court overturned the lower courts, allowing the layoffs to proceed.

== Purpose and functions ==
The department identifies four key functions:

- Establishing policies on federal financial aid for education and distributing as well as monitoring those funds.
- Collecting data on America's schools and disseminating research.
- Focusing national attention on key issues in education and making recommendations for education reform.
- Prohibiting discrimination and ensuring equal access to education.

The Department of Education is a member of the United States Interagency Council on Homelessness and works with federal partners to ensure proper education for homeless and runaway youth in the United States.

== History ==
=== Early history ===
In 1867, President Andrew Johnson signed legislation to create a Department of Education. It was seen as a way to collect information and statistics about the nation's schools and provide advice to schools in the same way the Department of Agriculture helped farmers. The department was originally proposed by Henry Barnard and leaders of the National Teachers Association, renamed the National Education Association. Barnard served as the first United States Commissioner of Education. He resigned when the office was reconfigured as a bureau in the Department of Interior, known as the United States Office of Education due to concerns it would have too much control over local schools.

Over the years, the office remained relatively small, operating under different titles and housed in various agencies, including the United States Department of the Interior and the former United States Department of Health Education and Welfare (HEW), now the United States Department of Health and Human Services (HHS). In 1920, an unsuccessful attempt at creating a Department of Education, headed by a secretary of education, came with the Smith–Towner Bill.

In 1939, the organization, then a bureau, was transferred to the Federal Security Agency, where it was renamed as the Office of Education. After World War II, President Dwight D. Eisenhower promulgated "Reorganization Plan No. 1 of 1953". The Federal Security Agency was abolished and most of its functions were transferred to the newly formed HEW.

=== Promotion to department ===
In 1979, President Carter advocated for creating a cabinet-level Department of Education. Carter's plan was to transfer most of the Department of Health, Education, and Welfare's education-related functions to the Department of Education. Carter also planned to transfer the education-related functions of the departments of Defense, Justice, Housing and Urban Development, and Agriculture, as well as a few other federal entities. Among the federal education-related programs that were not proposed to be transferred were Headstart, the Department of Agriculture's school lunch and nutrition programs, the Department of the Interior's Native Americans' education programs, and the Department of Labor's education and training programs.

Upgrading Education to cabinet-level status in 1979 was opposed by many in the Republican Party, who saw the department as unconstitutional, arguing that the Constitution does not mention education, and deemed it an unnecessary and illegal federal bureaucratic intrusion into local affairs. However, others saw the department as constitutional under the Commerce Clause, and that the funding role of the department is constitutional under the Taxing and Spending Clause. The National Education Association supported the bill, while the American Federation of Teachers opposed it.

In 1979, the Office of Education had 3,000 employees and an annual budget of $12 billion. Congress appropriated to the Department of Education an annual budget of $14 billion and 17,000 employees when establishing the Department of Education. During the 1980 presidential campaign, Gov. Reagan called for the total elimination of the U.S. Department of Education, severe curtailment of bilingual education, and massive cutbacks in the federal role in education. Once in office, President Reagan significantly reduced its budget, but in 1988, perhaps to reduce conflict with Congress, he decided to change his mind and ask for an increase from $18.4 billion to $20.3 billion.

=== Late twentieth century ===
The 1980 Republican Party platform called for the elimination of the Department of Education created under Carter, and President Ronald Reagan promised during the 1980 presidential election to eliminate it as a cabinet post, but he was not able to do so with a Democratic House of Representatives. In the 1982 State of the Union Address, he pledged: "The budget plan I submit to you on Feb. 8 will realize major savings by dismantling the Department of Education."

In 1984, the GOP dropped the call for elimination from its platform. With the election of President George H. W. Bush in 1988, the gap between Republicans and Democrats narrowed, with the eight goals of Clinton's Goals 2000 drawing heavily on those established previously by Bush and receiving substantial Republican support in Congress.

In 1994, after the Newt Gingrich–led "revolution" took control of both houses of Congress, federal control of and spending on education soared. That trend continued unabated despite the fact that the Republican Party made abolition of the department a cornerstone of its 1996 platform and campaign promises, calling it an inappropriate federal intrusion into local, state, and family affairs. The GOP platform read: "The Federal government has no constitutional authority to be involved in school curricula or to control jobs in the market place. This is why we will abolish the Department of Education, end federal meddling in our schools, and promote family choice at all levels of learning."

In 2000, the Republican Liberty Caucus passed a resolution to seek to abolish the Department of Education.

=== Twenty-first century ===
The George W. Bush administration made reform of federal education a key priority of the president's first term. In 2008 and 2012, presidential candidate Ron Paul campaigned in part on an opposition to the department.

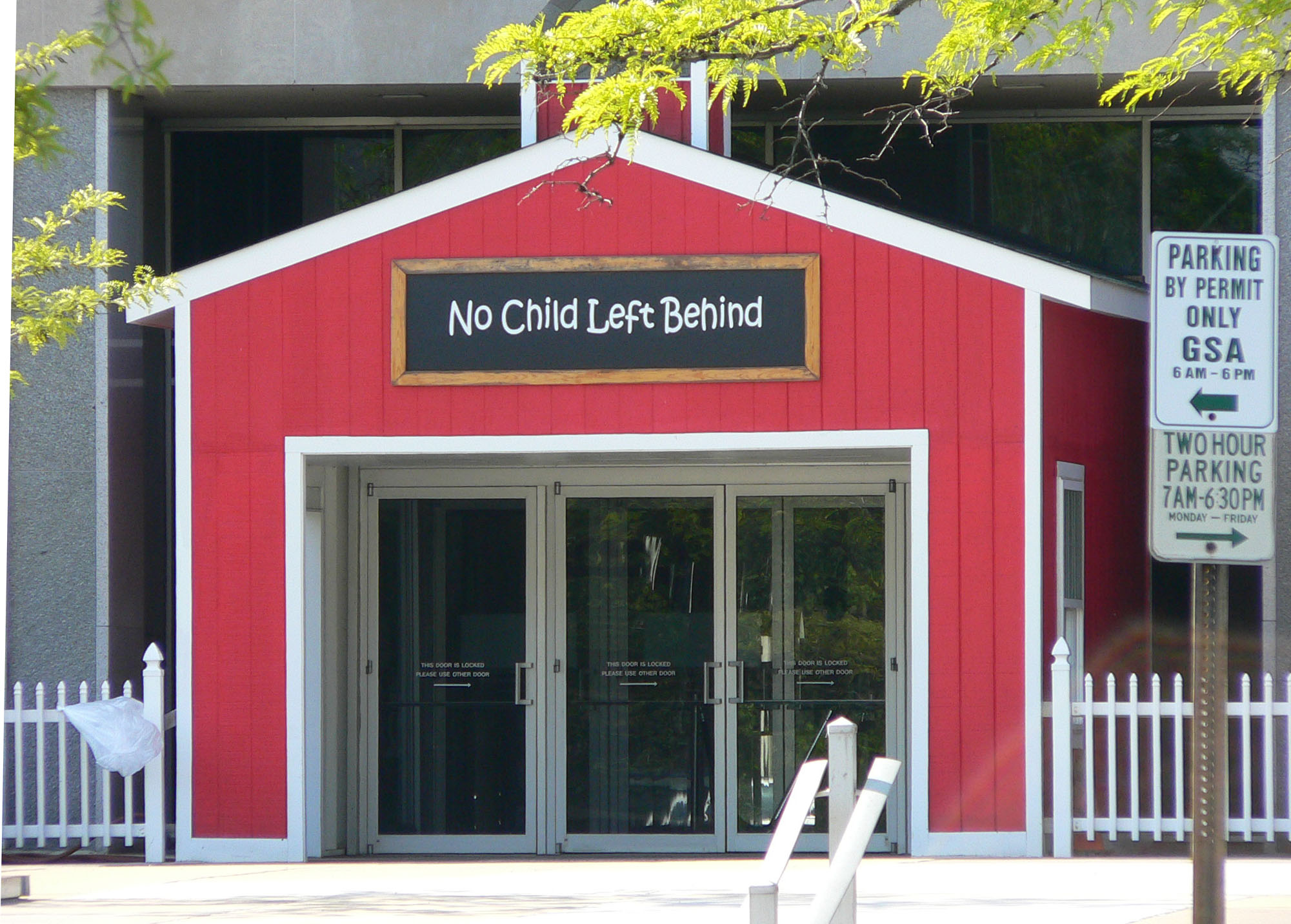
A construction project to repair and update the building façade at the Department of Education headquarters in 2002 installed structures at all of the entrances to protect employees and visitors from falling debris. ED redesigned these protective structures to promote the No Child Left Behind Act. The structures were temporary and were removed in 2008. Source: U.S. Department of Education

Under President George W. Bush, the department primarily focused on elementary and secondary education, expanding its reach through the No Child Left Behind Act. The department's budget increased by $14 billion between 2002 and 2004, from $46 billion to $60 billion.

In March 2007, President George W. Bush signed into law H.R. 584, which designates the ED Headquarters building as the Lyndon Baines Johnson Department of Education Building.

In December 2015, President Barack Obama signed the Every Student Succeeds Act, reauthorizing the Elementary Secondary Education Act and replacing the No Child Left Behind Act.

In 2022, extra costs resulted in a nominal departmental expenditure of $639 billion. These costs (total spending $540 billion compared with $170 billion in 2021) included pandemic costs but were mostly from the Office of Federal Student Aid and related to student loan forgiveness However, as a result of the SCOTUS ruling Biden v. Nebraska, the planned loan forgiveness never took place and, because no payments were actually made, a balancing entry was introduced in the following year's federal budget.

The department's 2023 budget was $274 billion, which included funding for children with disabilities (IDEA), pandemic recovery, early childhood education, Pell Grants, Title I, and work assistance, among other programs.

=== Second Trump administration ===
On January 20, 2025, President Donald Trump signed Executive Order 14148, eliminating several White House initiatives focused on educational equity housed within the Department:

- White House Initiative on Advancing Educational Equity, Excellence, and Economic Opportunity for Native Americans and Strengthening Tribal Colleges and Universities
- White House Initiative on Advancing Educational Equity, Excellence, and Economic Opportunity for Black Americans
- White House Initiative on Advancing Educational Equity, Excellence, and Economic Opportunity for Hispanics
- White House Initiative on Advancing Educational Equity, Excellence, and Economic Opportunity Through Hispanic-Serving Institutions.

In March 2025, Trump signed an executive order which would begin the dismantling of the Department of Education, seeking to fulfill decades of conservative ambition to eliminate the agency. The Office of Educational Technology was eliminated at this time. The White House earlier said the agency would continue to oversee "critical functions" like student loans. In April 2025, Linda McMahon announced that the Department of Education would resume garnishment of the wages of student debtors whose loans are in default.

Republican attempts to close the agency date back to the 1980s. Partisanship over the department has been rife since the start, from progressive-leaning teachers' unions who organized against President George W. Bush's "No Child Left Behind" policies to conservative Republican presidential candidates in 2016 who ran against the Common Core standards elevated by President Barack Obama's "Race to the Top" program. Efforts to close the department gained critical momentum during the coronavirus pandemic when a parental rights movement grew out of a backlash to school shutdowns. There was also opposition to progressive policies that promoted certain education standards and inclusive policies for LGBTQ students which, it was contended, undermined parental rights.

Project 2025, a Heritage Foundation policy plan, deals heavily with the closure of the Department of Education, mass privatization of public schools, and ending subsidized and free school lunches. Project 2025 also seeks to create a conservative school curriculum for all public schools. The plan also includes provisions for the layoffs of millions of public employed teachers. Trump's second term policies have been compared to Project 2025.

Multiple polls in February and March 2025 showed that roughly two-thirds of Americans oppose the idea. It is broadly opposed by educators who believe the federal government has historically played an important role in American education. The position of the National Education Association (NEA), representing 2.8 million American teachers, was that stripping the department of its resources and mission would negatively impact the millions of students in low-income communities who need educational services and support.

On March 3, 2025, Linda McMahon was sworn in as the nation's 13th Secretary of Education. Trump emphasized that McMahon's primary objective would be to close the Department of Education, stating, "I want her to put herself out of a job." McMahon echoed Trump's comments, stating that the department was not needed when asked directly if the United States needed the department.

On March 11, 2025, seven weeks after Donald Trump's second term began, the Department of Government Efficiency announced it would fire nearly half the Department of Education's workforce. Trump signed an order on March 20 aimed at closing the department to the maximum extent allowed by law; the department cannot be entirely closed without the approval of Congress, which created it. U.S. district judge Myong Joun in Boston blocked the mass layoff and the dismantle attempt on May 22, 2025. Though the Trump administration appealed, a federal appeals court declined on June 4 to lift Joun's ruling. On July 14, the Supreme Court allowed the mass layoffs to proceed in a 6-3 decision.

=== 2025 workforce reduction and reorganization ===
McMahon v. New York
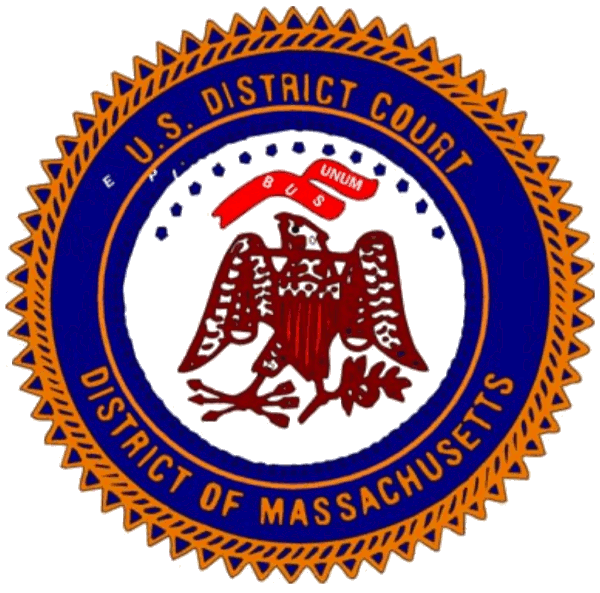
- Court: District of Massachusetts
- Started: March 13, 2025
- Docket nos.: 1:25-cv-10601 (D. Mass.); 25-1495, 25-1500 (1st Cir.); 24A1203 (SCOTUS)

Case history
- Appealed to: First Circuit
- Subsequent action: district ruling stayed by Supreme Court via shadow docket

Court membership
- Judge sitting: Myong J. Joun

On March 11, 2025, the Department of Education announced a major workforce reduction, eliminating nearly half of its employees—reducing staff from approximately 4,100 to about 2,100. The move, described by Secretary of Education Linda McMahon as part of a broad modernization effort, included a reorganization of Federal Student Aid (FSA) and the Office for Civil Rights (OCR). Remaining staff were placed on paid administrative leave beginning March 21, with separation or retirement packages scheduled by June 9. The Department stated the restructuring was necessary to streamline operations, reduce federal oversight in education, and shift key responsibilities to other federal agencies.

On March 20, 2025, Trump signed an executive order directing the secretary of education to "facilitate the closure of the Department of Education and return authority over education to the States and local communities". However, the department cannot be closed without the approval of Congress, which created it. NBC News said, "Given their narrow majority, Republicans would need Democratic support to do that, which would make it unlikely for such a bill to pass."

In November 2025, McMahon argued on social media that other federal agencies or state governments could take on the grantmaking and informational work that was currently performed by the Education Department.

==== Layoffs ====
In February 2025, US Department of Education offered its staff incentives to resign or retire early. In March 2025, the department announced a plan to reduce its workforce by half.

==== Impacts ====
Based on a preliminary review of the layoffs that were ordered, the majority of cuts were seen in the Federal Student Aid office which oversees financial aid disbursement and student loans, and the Office for Civil Rights, which protects students and teachers from discrimination. While current Education Secretary McMahon has claimed that congressionally appropriated monies such as financial aid will not be affected by the plan to downsize or close the department, staff turnover could create multiple problems for those receiving aid.

The Trump administration has promised that formula funding for schools, funding such as Title 1 for high poverty schools and the Rural Education Achievement Program (REAP), which are protected by law, would be preserved. However, nearly all statisticians and data experts who work with the program would be affected by the layoffs and downsizing of the department, as the department was downsized from over 100 people to just three workers.

The department oversees the lending of tens of billions of dollars in loans to students and parents and oversees the collections process of the roughly $1.6 trillion in outstanding loans for over 40 million borrowers as of March 2025. If the department were to be closed, it has been theorized by experts that other federal entities such as the Treasury Department would be left taking over the responsibilities of managing the loans. On March 21, 2025 it was announced by Trump that the management of the entire federal student loan portfolio and the other "special needs" programs overseen by the department would be moved to other departments. Trump specified that the Small Business Administration would take over responsibility for student loans and the Department of Health and Human Services would take on the special needs and nutrition programs.

==== Responses ====
In a joint letter, senators Elizabeth Warren, Bernie Sanders, and a group of Democratic senators spoke out against the mass layoffs that were seen in March 2025 and urged Education Secretary McMahon to reinstate employees that were laid off. Representative Bobby Scott, the ranking member on the House Committee on Education and the Workforce, raised claims that the dismantling of the department would "exacerbate existing disparities, reduce accountability, and put low-income students, students of color, students with disabilities, rural students, and English as a Second Language students at risk".

Derrick Johnson, the president and CEO of the NAACP, criticized Trump's attempt to close the department while raising allegations that Trump was dismantling the basic functions of democracy.

== Organization ==
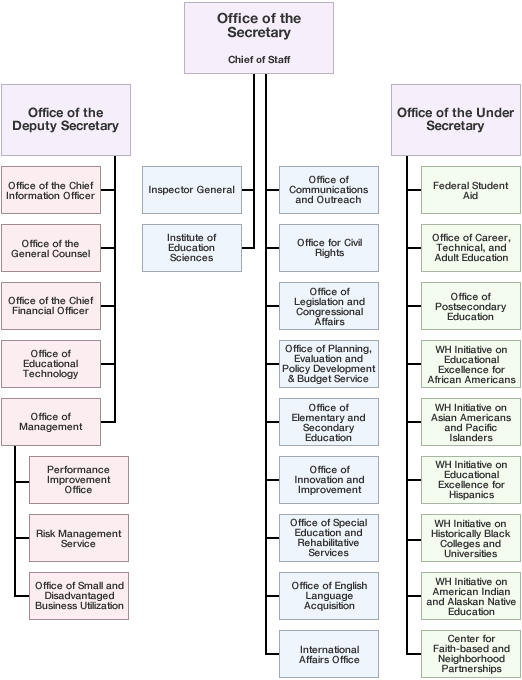
The structure of the Department of Education

Program
Secretary of Education	Office of Communications and Outreach
Secretary of Education	Office of the General Counsel
Secretary of Education	Office of Inspector General
Secretary of Education	Office of Legislation and Congressional Affairs
Secretary of Education	Office for Civil Rights
Secretary of Education	Institute of Education Sciences: National Center for Education Statistics; National Assessment of Educational Progress; Education Resources Information Center
Secretary of Education	Office of Innovation and Improvement
Secretary of Education	Office of Finance and Operations
Secretary of Education	Office of Management
Secretary of Education	Office of the Chief Information Officer
Secretary of Education	Office of Planning, Evaluation and Policy Development: Budget Service
Secretary of Education	Center for Faith
Secretary of Education	Risk Management Service
Deputy Secretary of Education	Office of Elementary and Secondary Education: Education Facilities Clearinghouse; Office of Migrant Education; Office of Safe and Healthy Students; Student Achievement and School Accountability Programs
Deputy Secretary of Education	Office of English Language Acquisition
Deputy Secretary of Education	Office of Special Education and Rehabilitative Services: National Institute on Disability and Rehabilitation Research; Office of Special Education Programs; Rehabilitation Services Administration
Deputy Secretary of Education	Office of Innovation and Improvement
Under Secretary of Education	Office of Postsecondary Education
Under Secretary of Education	Office of Career, Technical, and Adult Education
Under Secretary of Education	Office of Federal Student Aid
Under Secretary of Education	President's advisory board on Tribal Colleges and Universities
Under Secretary of Education	President's advisory board on Historically Black Colleges and Universities
Associated federal organizations	Advisory Councils and Committees
Associated federal organizations	National Assessment Governing Board (NAGB)
Associated federal organizations	National Advisory Council on Indian Education
Associated federal organizations	Federal Interagency Committee on Education
Associated federal organizations	Advisory Commission on Accessible Instructional Materials in Postsecondary Education for Students with Disabilities
Associated federal organizations	National Board for Education Sciences
Associated federal organizations	National Board of the Fund for the Improvement of Postsecondary Education
Federally aided organizations	Gallaudet University
Federally aided organizations	Howard University
Federally aided organizations	National Technical Institute for the Deaf

== Budget ==

- Office of Federal Student Aid: $160.7B (59.0%)
- Title I grants: $83B (30.5%)
- Special education: $20.7B (7.6%)
- Other: $8B (2.9%)
Budget of the Department of Education for FY 2024, showing its largest components

For 2024, the US Department of Education's budget was approximately $268 billion with $79,052,238 in discretionary spending. The department currently holds and maintains approximately $1.7 trillion in federal student loan debt.

== See also ==
- Council for Higher Education Accreditation
- Educational attainment in the United States
- Free Application for Federal Student Aid
- FICE code
- Federal Student Aid
- Higher education in the United States
- National Diffusion Network
- National Endowment for the Humanities
- School Improvement Grant
- Student loans in the United States
- Title 34 of the Code of Federal Regulations

=== Related legislation ===
- 1965: Elementary and Secondary Education Act (ESEA)
- 1965: Higher Education Act of 1965 (HEA) (Pub. L. No. 89-329)
- 1974: Family Educational Rights and Privacy Act (FERPA)
- 1974: Equal Educational Opportunities Act of 1974 (EEOA)
- 1975: Education for All Handicapped Children Act (EHA) (Pub. L. No. 94-142)
- 1978: Protection of Pupil Rights Amendment
- 1979: Department of Education Organization Act (Pub. L. No. 96-88)
- 1984: Equal Access Act
- 1990: The Jeanne Clery Disclosure of Campus Security Policy and Campus Crime Statistics Act (Clery Act)
- 1994: Improving America's Schools Act of 1994
- 2001: No Child Left Behind Act (NCLB)
- 2004: Individuals with Disabilities Education Act (IDEA)
- 2005: Higher Education Reconciliation Act of 2005 (HERA) (Pub. L. No. 109-171)
- 2006: Carl D. Perkins Career and Technical Education Improvement Act
- 2007: America COMPETES Act
- 2008: Higher Education Opportunity Act (HEOA) (Pub. L. No. 110-315)
- 2009: Race to the Top
- 2009: Student Aid and Fiscal Responsibility Act
- 2010: Health Care and Education Reconciliation Act of 2010
- 2015: Every Student Succeeds Act (ESSA)
