= OII =

OII may refer to:

== Organisations ==
- OII, market exchange symbol for Oceaneering International
- Office of Innovation and Improvement, an office of the United States Department of Education
- Organisation Intersex International, a global advocacy and support group for people with intersex traits
- Oxford Internet Institute, a multi-disciplinary department, part of the University of Oxford, England

== See also ==
- Organisation Intersex International Australia
- OII Europe
- Oii-Chinese, the Chinese language affiliate of Organisation Intersex International
