= 2024 North Dakota elections =

- November 5, 2024

North Dakota held two statewide elections in 2024: a primary election on June 11, and a general election on November 5.

== Primary election ==
On June 11, North Dakota voters selected which candidates for statewide and legislative office will appear on the November ballot. Because North Dakota does not have party registration, any eligible voter could vote in any one party's primary election. In addition, any number of constitutional amendments, initiated measures, or referred measures will be placed on the ballot by petition or legislative action.

== General election ==
On November 5, concurrent with other statewide elections across the United States, North Dakota voters selected one United States senator, one United States representative, secretary of state, attorney general, and several other statewide executive and judicial branch offices. Voters in even-numbered legislative districts also selected their representatives to the North Dakota House of Representatives and North Dakota Senate.

=== Federal offices ===
==== United States Senator ====
Incumbent Republican senator Kevin Cramer ran for re-election. He was elected in 2018 with 55.11% of the vote.

==== United States Representative ====
Incumbent Republican representative Kelly Armstrong was re-elected in 2022 with 62.2% of the vote. Armstrong announced on January 23, 2024, that he would not seek re-election, instead running for Governor of North Dakota.

=== State offices ===
==== Governor and lieutenant governor ====
Republican incumbent governor Doug Burgum announced on January 22, 2024, that he would not seek a third term.

==== Treasurer ====
Incumbent Republican treasurer Thomas Beadle was elected in 2020 with 65.60% of the vote. Beadle ran for re-election.

==== Auditor ====
Incumbent Republican auditor Josh Gallion was elected in 2020 with 67.69% of the vote. Gallion ran for re-election.

==== Insurance Commissioner ====
Results by county Godfread: 90–100%

Incumbent Republican Insurance Commissioner Jon Godfread was re-elected in 2020 with 97.74% of the vote. He ran for re-election and was unopposed.

==== Superintendent of Public Instruction ====
Results by county Baesler: 50–60%; 60–70%

Incumbent Republican Superintendent Kirsten Baesler was re-elected in 2020 with 59.13% of the vote. She ran for re-election.

==== Public Service Commissioner ====
2024 North Dakota Public Service Commissioner election
- November 5, 2024
Nominee	Randy Christmann	Tracey L. Wilkie
Party	Republican	Democratic–NPL
Popular vote	242,962	104,133
Percentage	69.86%	29.94%
- County results Christmann: 50–60% 60–70% 70–80% 80–90% 90–100% Wilkie: 60–70%
Public Service Commissioner before election
Randy Christmann
Republican
Elected Public Service Commissioner
Randy Christmann
Republican

One of three seats in the state Public Service Commission are up for election. In 2020, Brian Kroshus was elected.

==== State legislature ====
23 seats in the North Dakota Senate and 46 seats in the North Dakota House of Representatives are up for election. Voters in all even-numbered districts will be electing legislators. This was the first election affected by North Dakota Constitutional Measure 1, passed by voters in 2022, setting term limits for state legislators.
