= U.S. Department of Education, Office of Inspector General =

Agency overview
- Formed: 1979
- Headquarters: Washington, D.C.
- Agency executives: Mark Priebe, Acting Inspector General; René Rocque, Deputy Inspector General
- Parent agency: U.S. Department of Education
- Website: Office of Inspector General

The U.S. Department of Education Office of Inspector General (ED OIG) is an inspector general office created by the Department of Education Organization Act. The inspector general for the Department of Education is charged with investigating and auditing department programs to combat waste, fraud, and abuse.

== Organizational Structure ==
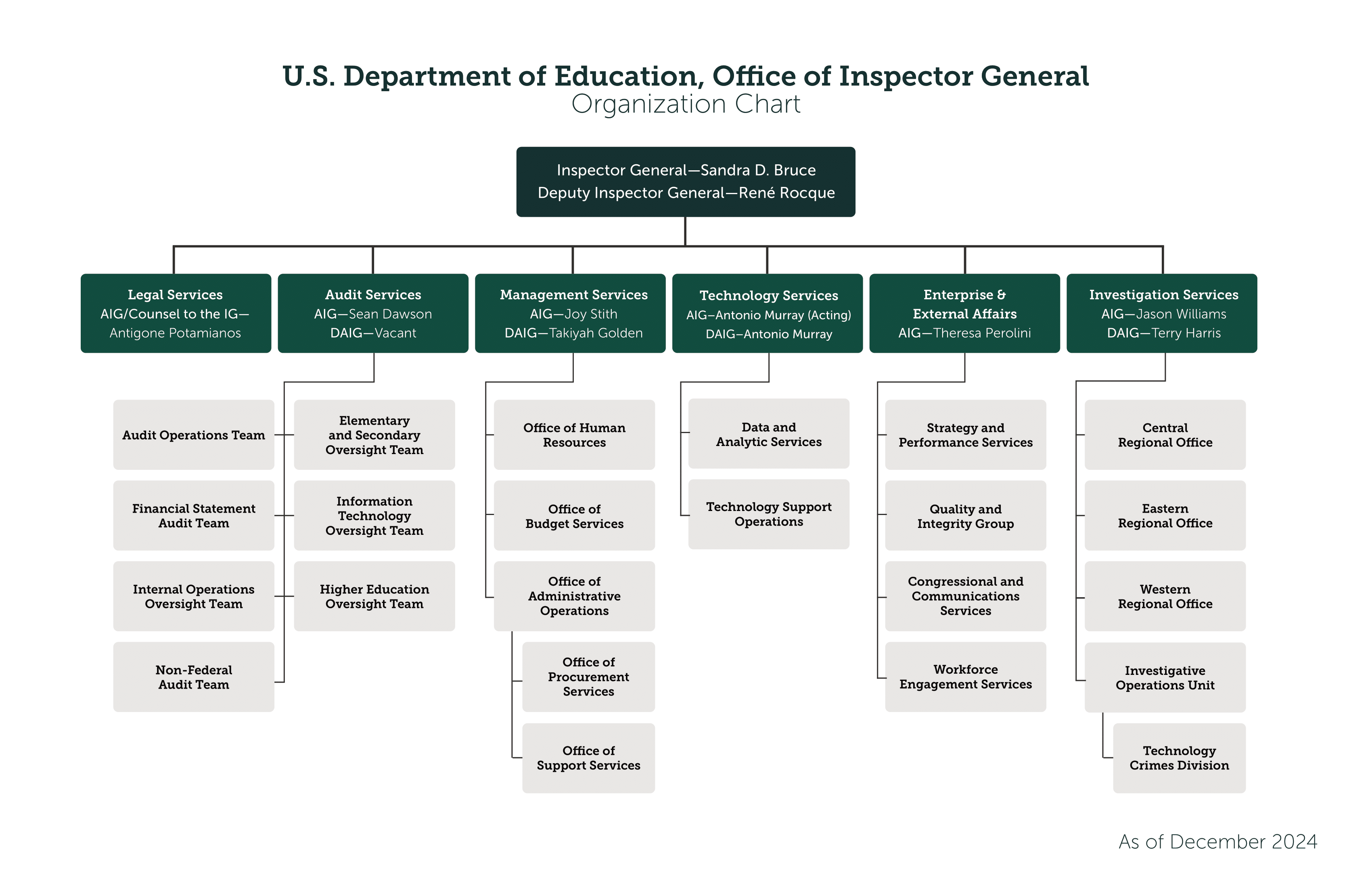
OIG ED Organizational Chart | December 2024

The Office of Inspector General is broken up into six main components: management services, legal services, audit services, technology services, enterprise & external affairs, and investigation services. Each component is headed by an Assistant Inspector General (AIG) assisted by a Deputy Assistant Inspector General (DAIG).

=== Immediate Office of the Inspector General ===
The Immediate Office of the Inspector General (IOIG) is responsible for the coordination and oversight of the OIG’s mission, providing overall leadership, setting the direction of the OIG, and providing internal management support and communications services. It consists of the IG, DIG, the executive staff, as well as Enterprise & External Affairs.

=== Enterprise and External Affairs ===
OIG Enterprise & External Affairs (EEA) facilitates activities impacting the entire OIG enterprise, including strategic planning, organizational performance management, workforce engagement, communications, risk management, internal oversight, and quality checks of investigations.

==== Executives ====
- Assistant Inspector General, Theresa Perolini

==== Subcomponents ====
- Strategy and Performance Services
- Quality and Integrity Group
- Congressional and Communications Services
- Workforce Engagement Services

=== Audit Services ===
OIG Audit Services (AS) is responsible for audit-related activities aimed at improving Department programs and operations, including Federal student aid, K–12 schools, charter schools, special education, vocational education, adult education, and more. Audit Services conducts analyses, internal and external audits, inspections, reviews, and special studies designed to improve Department programs and operations.

==== Executives ====
- Assistant Inspector General, Sean Dawson

==== Subcomponents ====
- Elementary and Secondary Oversight Team
- Information Technology Oversight Team
- Higher Education Oversight Team
- Audit Operations Team
- Financial Statement Audit Team
- Internal Operations Oversight Team
- Non-Federal Audit Team

=== Investigation Services ===
OIG Investigation Services (IS) is composed of law enforcement professionals who conduct criminal and civil investigations involving Department programs, operations, and funding. Investigation Services’ special agents investigate suspected fraudulent activities by Department employees, contractors, grant recipients, school officials—in essence any entity or individual that awards, disburses, or receives Department funds or participates in its programs. Investigation Services also tackles cybercrime affecting and involving the use of Department IT systems. Investigation Services maintains the OIG Hotline.

==== Executives ====
- Assistant Inspector General, Jason Williams
- Deputy Assistant Inspector General, Terry Harris

==== Subcomponents ====
- Central Regional Office
- Eastern Regional Office
- Western Regional Office
- Investigative Operations Unit
  - Technology Crimes Division

=== Technology Services ===
OIG Technology Services (TS) provides advanced data analytics in support of OIG audits and investigations, and maintains the OIG’s systems, its IT infrastructure and security posture.

==== Executives ====
- Assistant Inspector General, Antonio Murray (acting)
- Deputy Assistant Inspector General, Antonio Murray

==== Subcomponents ====
- Data and Analytic Services
- Technology Support Operations

=== Legal Services ===
OIG Legal Services (LS) manages the OIG’s legal and Freedom of Information Act functions as well as provides legal assistance to the Inspector General and OIG staff, and ensure all operations of the Office are in compliance with all federal statutes and regulatory requirements. LS staff also ensure OIG staff are acting ethically.

==== Executives ====
- Counsel to the Inspector General, Antigone Potamianos

=== Management Services ===
OIG Management Services (MS) provides administrative and management support to the Inspector General and all OIG components, including managing the budget, human resources, facility & property, procurement, and managing OIG administrative and management policy and procedures.

==== Executives ====
- Assistant Inspector General, Joy Stith
- Deputy Assistant Inspector General, Takiyah Golden

==== Subcomponents ====
- Office of Human Resources
- Office of Budget Services
- Office of Administrative Operations
  - Office of Procurement Services
  - Office of Support Services

== History of Inspectors General ==
| Inspector General | Appointment Date |
|---|---|
| René Rocque (Acting) | September 17, 2026 |
| Mark Priebe (Acting) | November 10, 2025 |
| Heidi Seeman (Acting) | July 7, 2025 |
| René Rocque (Acting) | January 24, 2025 |
| Sandra Bruce | January 26, 2022 |
| Sandra Bruce (Acting) | December 3, 2018 |
| Kathleen S. Tighe | March 17, 2010 |
| Mary Mitchelson (Acting) | July 1, 2008 |
| John P. Higgins Jr. | November 27, 2002 |
| John P. Higgins Jr. (Acting) | May 27, 2002 |
| Lorraine Pratte Lewis | June 14, 1999 |
| John P. Higgins Jr. (Acting) | March 1, 1998 |
| Steve McNamara (Acting) | January 1, 1998 |
| Thomas R. Bloom | January 3, 1996 |
| John P. Higgins Jr. (Acting) | April 3, 1995 |
| Gretchen C. Schwarz (Acting) | March 4, 1995 |
| James B. Thomas Jr. | July 27, 1981 |
| John C. Yazurlo (Acting) | January 27, 1981 |
| James B. Thomas Jr. | August 26, 1980 |
| John C. Yazurlo (Acting) | May 4, 1980 |
