= Student Achievement and School Accountability Programs =

Student Achievement and School Accountability Programs (SASA) is a division of the Office of Elementary and Secondary Education (OESE) of the U.S. Department of Education (ED) that administers programs of financial assistance to State and local education agencies (LEA) and to colleges and universities. Under Title I of the Elementary and Secondary Education Act (ESEA) of 1965, SASA administers several Title I programs of supplementary instruction and other services. This includes programs such as the Improving Basic Programs Operated by LEAs and the Prevention and Intervention Programs for Children Who are Neglected, Delinquent, or At-Risk. Under Title III of the ESEA, SASA administers the State Formula Grant Program for English Language Acquisition and Language Enhancement. SASA also administers the Education for Homeless Children and Youth program authorized by the McKinney–Vento Homeless Assistance Act (P.L. 100-77).

== Organization ==
SASA is headed by a Director who reports to the Assistant Secretary and/or Deputy Assistant Secretary for Elementary and Secondary Education. The current director is Dr. Zollie Stevenson, Jr.

SASA is divided into six Program Groups:

=== Policy Coordination Group ===
The Policy Coordination Group is responsible for policy coordination and develops policy guidance that clarifies for implementation purposes the principal themes of the President's education blueprint. Title I formula grant allocations are also managed by this group as is the programmatic focus on services to non-public schools. The group influences the educational community and others who need to understand the parameters for implementing Title I requirements.

=== Standards and Assessments Group ===
The Standards and Assessments Group is responsible for ensuring that States develop the standards and assessment systems required by the new Title I. The group provides direct technical assistance to States and also provides specialized technical assistance through external experts for longer term interventions for States with significant assessment issues. They also work with the States to help them comply in a manner that results in systems of standards and assessments that drive instructional change.

=== Instructional Change Group ===
The Instructional Change Group is responsible for changing the face of teaching and learning in Title I schools in a manner that focuses on what works to generate improved results for children. This unit helps technical assistance providers work with schools to implement Title I programs in ways that focus on improving classroom instruction, including the involvement of parents in their child's education. In addition, this unit works with States to design, implement, and evaluate State systems of support for making Title I targeted assistance and schoolwide programs more effective vehicles for instructional change and for turning around low-performing schools. This group also has responsibility for working with content and regional comprehensive centers funded by the Department to develop strategies and materials to aid schools in corrective action and restructuring.

=== Monitoring Group ===
The Monitoring Group is responsible for instituting a process of achievement-focused monitoring for compliance with the implementation of Title I, Parts A, B and D and the McKinney-Vento Homeless Education programs. States not fully compliant are presented with the opportunity to take corrective actions to address identified concerns. It is through the monitoring process that this group influences the extent to which States, school districts, and schools consider how they are using federal education resources to improve student achievement.

=== Accountability Group ===
The Accountability Group is responsible for ensuring that States develop and update the accountability systems used to hold school districts and schools responsible for student achievement under Title I, Part A as amended by the No Child Left Behind Act (NCLB). This group reviews and recommends approval or disapproval of annual State amendments to their Title I required accountability plans and orchestrates the peer review process for the growth model accountability pilot program authorized by the Secretary. The group will also be involved with managing the development/refinement of data definitions associated with NCLB accountability and the annual Consolidated State Performance Report. The group will provide direct technical assistance to States and also provides specialized TA through external experts for longer term interventions for States with significant assessment and accountability issues. They also will work with the States to help them comply in a manner that results in systems of standards and assessments that drive instructional change.

=== Title III State Formula Grants Group ===
The Title III State Formula Grants Group is responsible for the administration of the Title III State formula grant program. The group works collaboratively with the Office of English Language Acquisition and the other SASA groups to develop policy guidance, monitor program compliance, ensure program accountability, and provide State and local educational agencies with technical assistance to develop and enhance their capacity for developing standards and assessment systems and providing high quality language instruction educational programs for English language learners.
