= 2012 North Dakota elections =

North Dakota state election

- November 6, 2012

The state of North Dakota held a series of elections on November 6, 2012. In addition to selecting presidential electors, North Dakota voters selected one of its two United States Senators and its lone United States Representative, as well as seven statewide executive officers and one Supreme Court Justice. Primary elections were held on June 12, 2012.

== United States President and Vice President ==
North Dakota voters chose three electors to represent them in the Electoral College via a popular vote. Voters selected the Republican challengers, former Massachusetts Governor Mitt Romney and Congressman Paul Ryan, over the Democratic incumbent President Barack Obama and Vice President Joe Biden.

2012 United States Presidential election in North Dakota
Party	Candidate	Votes	%
Republican	Mitt Romney and Paul Ryan	188,320	58.32
Democratic–NPL	Barack Obama and Joe Biden	124,966	38.70
Libertarian	Gary Johnson and Jim Gray	5,238	1.62
Write-in		1,860	0.58
Green	Jill Stein and Cheri Honkala	1,362	1.62
Constitution	Virgil Goode and Jim Clymer	1,186	0.37
Total votes		322,932	100.00
Republican win			

== United States Senator ==
Voters selected a senator to replace the retiring incumbent, Kent Conrad of the Democratic-NPL. Former Democratic-NPL Attorney General Heidi Heitkamp defeated U.S. Representative Rick Berg in a close race.

2012 United States Senate election in North Dakota
Party	Candidate	Votes	%
Democratic–NPL	Heidi Heitkamp	161,337	50.24
Republican	Rick Berg	158,401	49.32
Write-in		1,406	0.44
Total votes		321,144	100.00
Democratic–NPL hold			

== United States House of Representatives ==
Voters selected a representative to the United States House of Representatives to replace incumbent Republican Rick Berg, who instead ran for the Senate. Republican Public Service Commissioner Kevin Cramer defeated former Democratic-NPL state representative Pam Gulleson.

2012 United States House of Representatives election in North Dakota
Party	Candidate	Votes	%
Republican	Kevin Cramer	173,585	54.89
Democratic–NPL	Pam Gulleson	131,870	41.70
Libertarian	Eric Olson	10,261	3.24
Write-in		508	0.16
Total votes		316,224	100.00
Republican hold			

== Governor ==
In the gubernatorial election, Republican incumbent Governor Jack Dalrymple, who had succeeded to the office when then-Governor John Hoeven resigned, won election to a first full term with his running mate, incumbent Lieutenant Governor Drew Wrigley.

2012 North Dakota gubernatorial election
Party	Candidate	Votes	%
Republican	Jack Dalrymple and Drew Wrigley	200,525	63.10
Democratic–NPL	Ryan Taylor and Ellen Chaffee	109,048	34.31
Independent	Paul Sorum and Michael Coachman	5,356	1.69
Independent	Roland Riemers and Anthony Johns	2,618	0.82
Write-in		267	0.08
Total votes		317,814	100.00
Republican hold			

== State Auditor ==
Results by county Peterson: 50–60%; 60–70%; 70–80%; 80–90%; Kelsh: 50–60%; 70–80%

In the election for State Auditor, voters selected Republican incumbent Bob Peterson over Democratic-NPL state representative Scot Kelsh.

2012 North Dakota State Auditor election
Party	Candidate	Votes	%
Republican	Bob Peterson	188,859	62.50
Democratic–NPL	Scot Kelsh	112,803	37.33
Write-in		515	0.17
Total votes		302,177	100.00
Republican hold			

== State Treasurer ==
Results by county Schmidt: 50–60%; 60–70%; 70–80%; 80–90%; Mushik: 50–60%; 70–80%

In the state treasurer election, Republican incumbent Kelly Schmidt defeated the Democratic-NPL challenger, accountant Ross Mushik.

2012 North Dakota State Treasurer election
Party	Candidate	Votes	%
Republican	Kelly Schmidt	197,041	65.83
Democratic–NPL	Ross Mushik	101,795	34.01
Write-in		470	0.16
Total votes		299,306	100.00
Republican hold			

== Insurance Commissioner ==
Results by county Hamm: 50–60%; 60–70%; 70–80%; 80–90%; Potter: 50–60%; 70–80%

In the race for Insurance Commissioner, voters selected Republican incumbent Adam Hamm over the Democratic-NPL challenger Tom Potter.

2012 North Dakota Insurance Commissioner election
Party	Candidate	Votes	%
Republican	Adam Hamm	192,031	63.25
Democratic–NPL	Tom Potter	111,099	36.59
Write-in		483	0.16
Total votes		303,613	100.00
Republican hold			

== Public Service Commissioner ==
Results by county Christmann: 40–50%; 50–60%; 60–70%; 70–80%; Crabtree: 40–50%; 50–60%; 70–80%

Voters were given the opportunity to fill one of the three seats on the Public Service Commission, selecting Republican Randy Christmann over Democratic-NPL and Libertarian party candidates.

2012 North Dakota Public Service Commissioner election
Party	Candidate	Votes	%
Republican	Randy Christmann	164,591	54.48
Democratic–NPL	Brad Crabtree	123,978	41.04
Libertarian	Joshua Voytek	13,098	4.34
Write-in		432	0.14
Total votes		302,099	100.00
Republican hold			

== Superintendent of Public Instruction ==
Results by county Baesler: 50–60%; 60–70%; Potter: 40–50%; 50–60%

In the nonpartisan election for Superintendent of Public Instruction, voters awarded the position to Kirsten Baesler, who had been endorsed by the Republican Party, instead of Tracy Potter, who had been endorsed by the Democratic-NPL party.

2012 North Dakota Superintendent of Public Instruction election
Candidate	Votes	%
Kirsten Baesler	154,177	55.05
Tracy Potter	124,807	44.57
Write-in	1,069	0.38
Total votes	280,053	100.00

== Justice of the Supreme Court ==
Results by county Crothers: 90–100%

In the nonpartisan election for Justice of the North Dakota Supreme Court, Judge Daniel Crothers ran unopposed.

2012 Justice of the North Dakota Supreme Court election
Candidate	Votes	%
Daniel Crothers	251,795	99.15
Write-in	2,146	0.85
Total votes	253,941	100.00
