= Doug Burgum 2024 presidential campaign =

American political campaign

Doug Burgum for America
- Campaign: 2024 Republican primaries 2024 U.S. presidential election
- Candidate: Doug Burgum; 33rd Governor of North Dakota (2016–2024)
- Affiliation: Republican Party
- Announced: June 7, 2023
- Suspended: December 4, 2023
- Headquarters: Fargo, North Dakota
- Key people: Mike Zolnierowicz (campaign manager); Miles White (campaign chair)
- Slogan: A New Leader for a Changing Economy

Website
- www.dougburgum.com

The Doug Burgum 2024 presidential campaign began on June 7, 2023, at an event in Fargo, North Dakota. Burgum, the governor of North Dakota since 2016, was seeking the Republican Party nomination in its 2024 presidential primaries. Following his failure to qualify for the third or fourth Republican debate, and his lack of presence in the polls, Burgum withdrew his candidacy on December 4, 2023.

== Campaign ==
=== Speculation ===
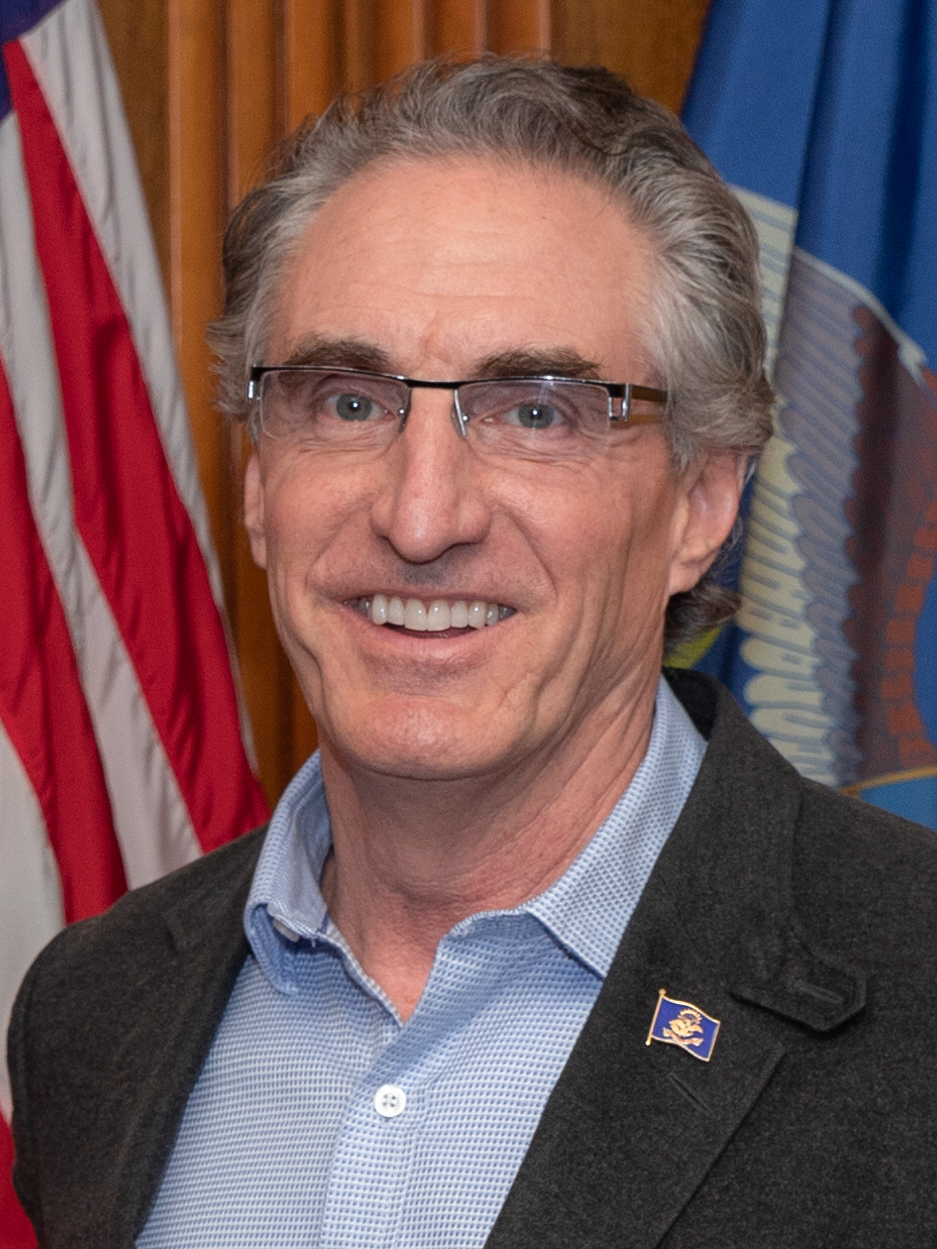
Burgum in 2018

Doug Burgum had been considered to be a potential candidate for the presidential election since March 2023. By May, it had been reported that he was filming commercials and was working with political consultants with presidential campaign experience.

=== Launch ===
On June 5, 2023, Burgum posted a video to his Twitter account, highlighting his accomplishments as governor and teasing a "big announcement" on June 7. He formally announced his campaign in The Wall Street Journal the morning of June 7, with the launch of a campaign website and a rally in Fargo scheduled to take place later that day.

On June 12, it was reported that Burgum had become the top-spending candidate in both Iowa and New Hampshire, mostly on television advertisements. On June 21, 2023, Politico reported that Burgum hired Mike Zolnierowicz, former Chief of Staff to Bruce Rauner, as his campaign manager.

Burgum has defended his entry into an already-crowded race with the assertion that additional competition will be good for the party, while highlighting his Midwestern roots and history of working in manual labor positions before becoming wealthy in the technology sector.

=== First debate ===
To secure his place on the debate stages, Burgum offered individuals who donated $1 to his campaign a $20 gift card as a "Biden Relief Card", an offer which prompted questions of its legality. On July 19, he announced that he had cleared the 40,000 donor requirement to appear in the first Republican presidential primary debate. In a June 7 poll shortly after announcing his candidacy, 90% of Republican voters responded that they did not know who Burgum was and going into the first debate he was polling at just 0.4%.

Burgum attended the first debate on August 23, 2023, despite injuring his Achilles tendon the day prior while playing a basketball game with his campaign staff. Burgum had the second smallest amount of speaking time of any of the candidates at the debate.

=== Second debate ===
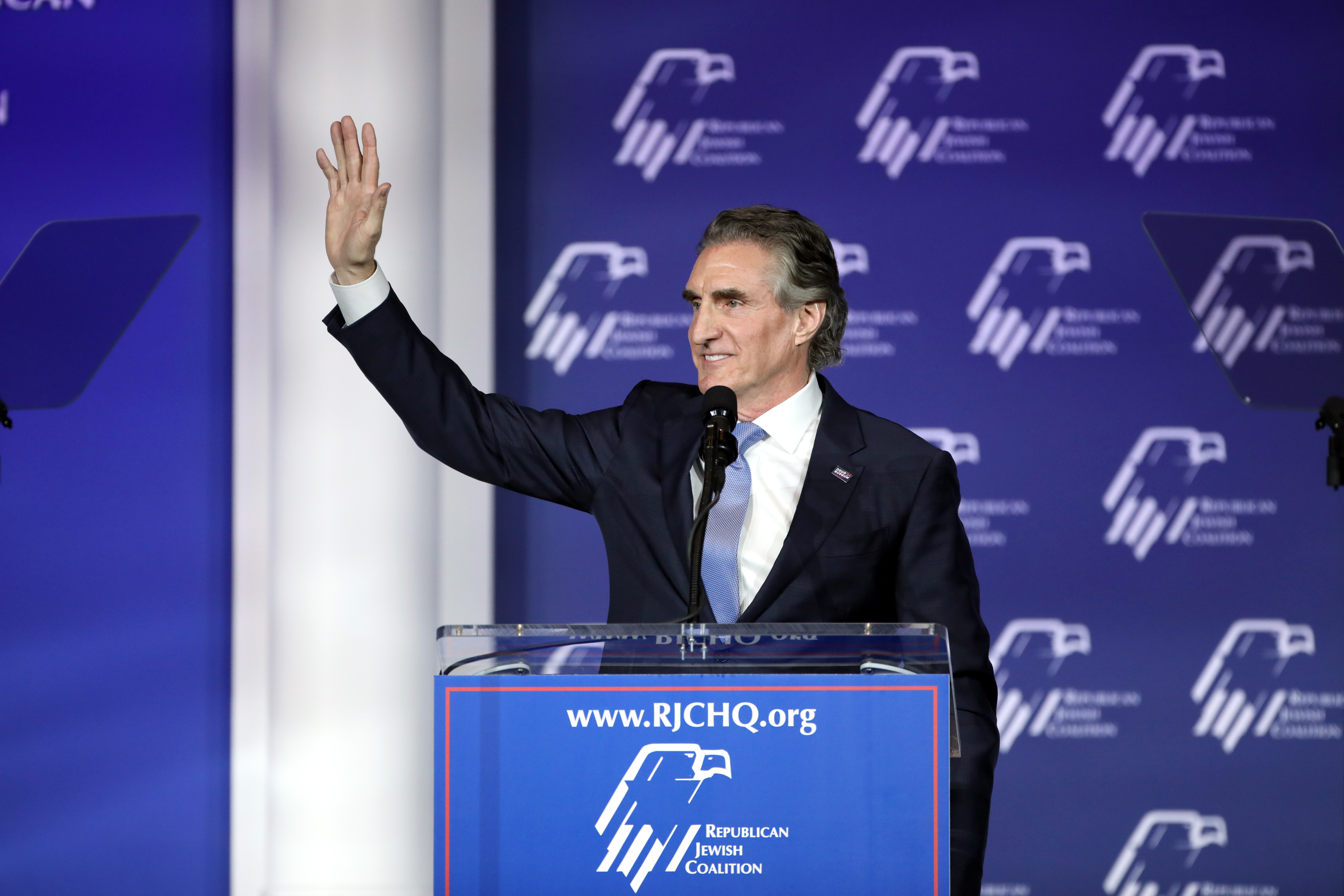
Burgum at the 2023 Republican Jewish Coalition's Annual Leadership Summit in Las Vegas

Burgum's presence at the first debate failed to result in any serious boost to his campaign numbers, and he risked not being qualified to attend the second debate, as he needed three percent of the vote in several polls to qualify. A Super PAC supporting him, Best of America PAC, rolled out a national ad campaign in an attempt to help him make the second debate that was set for September 27.

As the debate drew closer, and without a noticeable improvement in the polls, Burgum expressed frustration with the polling requirements, calling them a "goofy clubhouse rule." He also stated that if he did not make the second debate he intended to continue to run his campaign through at least the Iowa and New Hampshire primaries. On September 23, Burgum reached the three percent threshold in one national poll and on September 26 was added to the list of candidates that would attend the debate.

As the most marginal candidate, Burgum was not frequently called on by the debate moderators, and only had eight minutes and four seconds of speaking time; however, he interjected himself to answer questions even if he wasn't asked. Notably Burgum focused on Biden's EV policy, stating that his outsourcing of battery production to China, and shift away from traditional automobiles will only exacerbate problems like the UAW strike.

Burgum's support peaked with a 3% presence in a late September poll, and polled at close to 1% after the second debate. Larry Jacobs, the political studies chairman at the University of Minnesota, stated that Burgum's campaign has lacked a "compelling moment": some endorsement, widely shared speech, or other event to spark a sudden shift in Burgum's favor. By October 2023, Burgum has spent upwards of $25 million on his campaign, with $10 million coming from his own pocket, and with no real shift in the polls to show for it. In an effort to boost his campaign, Burgum doubled down on $20 gift cards for a $1 donation, a ploy which helped him secure a spot on the first and second debate stage.

Burgum was forced to take a break in his campaign, starting on October 22, for a special session of the North Dakota Legislative Assembly after the North Dakota Supreme Court struck down the state's budget as unconstitutional, stating that the general budget did not meet North Dakota's constitution's single-subject requirement for bills. Burgum had to be present in Bismarck to approve the 14 separate budget bills that the legislature seeks to pass to recreate the initial budget. The break was expected to take a full week, with Burgum stating he expected to return to the campaign by November 1, however, the special session resolved the budget and was closed in just three days.

Emerging from his hiatus on October 25, Burgum focused on attempting to qualify for the third and final Republican debate in Miami on November 8. Burgum reported that he had over the 70,000 required donors to attend, however, did not have a national poll where he is at 4% or better. Burgum stated that despite the outcome of his presence in the third debate, that he would continue his campaign, until at least the Nevada Caucus on February 8, 2024. Burgum's campaign was optimistic that he would be able to absorb most, if not all, of Mike Pence's electorate, following Pence's suspension of his campaign on October 28. However, Burgum failed to qualify for the third debate.

=== Third debate and withdrawal ===
Our decision to run for President came from a place of caring deeply about every American and a mission to re-establish trust in America's leadership and our institutions of democracy. While this primary process has shaken my trust in many media organizations and political party institutions, it has only strengthened my trust in America.

— Doug Burgum suspending his campaign

Following his failure to make the third debate, Burgum tweeted on X that "DC insiders are trying to stop me from fighting for you! It's not gonna work. Party bosses don't pick presidents – voters do!" and indicated that he would continue his campaign until at least the Florida primary, the latest primary that he has qualified for the ballot, on March 19, 2024. Burgum also went on to claim that his lack of presence at the debate was the reason viewership declined by millions from the second debate.

On 7 November 2023, New Hampshire governor Chris Sununu called on Burgum, alongside Asa Hutchinson to drop out of the race stating that the two have no path to victory. In response Burgum wrote an op-ed in the Jamestown Sun defending his campaign, arguing that he is the underdog candidate, and that his campaign reflects his own underdog story of founding a tech company in the Great Plains and winning the 2016 gubernatorial primary after being down 59%. Burgum then touted his economic reforms in North Dakota and criticized Joe Biden's foreign policy concluding that the voters of Iowa and New Hampshire determine the nominee, not the Republican National Convention (RNC).

On 10 November 2023, the North Dakota News Cooperative (NDNC) submitted a poll of Republicans in North Dakota and found that Burgum came in third place with 12% of the vote, behind Ron DeSantis at 14% and Donald Trump with a commanding 54% lead. The Forum of Fargo-Moorhead concluded that this shows that Burgum's disconnect with the voters isn't his lack of name recognition, which he has more than enough of in North Dakota, but rather that fundamentally his message is out of touch with Republicans and that Burgum should drop out of the race. Shortly after, on 13 November, the National Review also called on Burgum to suspend his campaign, alongside Chris Christie citing the departure of Mike Pence and Tim Scott, alongside his lack of national recognition, however, National Review also noted that Burgum is running with the intention to win, which they called "delusional".

After the NDNC poll and his op-ed on November 12, Burgum announced that he would continue his campaign until at least the New Hampshire primary on January 23. Shortly after on 14 November, Burgum announced he would perform a five-day campaign swing in Iowa. Despite this, two days before the fourth Republican national debate on December 4, 2023, Burgum announced the suspension of his campaign due to the lack of movement in the polls and his failure to qualify for the fourth debate.

Burgum got 502 votes during the whole 2024 Republican Party presidential primaries.

=== Aftermath ===
In December 2023 Burgum announced that he would not accept a position in Donald Trump's cabinet should he win the 2024 election, instead stating that he plans on returning to the private sector after his term as governor expires. Later in July 2024 Burgum stated he had a phone call with Trump which indicated he would be given a cabinet position, stating he would like to do something regarding technology and AI.

On January 14, 2024, Burgum endorsed former President Donald Trump for president. He subsequently became one of Trump's media representatives and advisors, and was a finalist for the 2024 Republican Party vice presidential candidate selection.

On November 14, 2024, then President-Elect Donald Trump announced Burgum as his pick for the Secretary of the Interior.

== Funding ==
Burgum's campaign had been notably able to garner large amounts of funds, raising $15.2 million by October 20, despite his low presence in the polls. This was thanks to a series of ultra-wealthy donors backing Burgum, including: First International Bank CEO Steve Stenehjem, actor Josh Duhamel, New York Jets lineman Connor McGovern, Coca-Cola CEO J. Frank Harrison III, eBay chairman Thomas J. Tierney, Milwaukee Bucks owner Michael Fascitelli and Microsoft executives Patrick Meenan and Ryan Kruizenga. Burgum was also supported by a series of SuperPACs, namely those created by Senators John Hoeven and Kevin Cramer, as well as The Minn-Dak Farmers Cooperative PAC, the North Dakota Petroleum Council PAC, and the pro-Coal Lignite Energy Council PAC.

Burgum's campaign was also largely self funded. Forbes estimated that his net worth at the start of his campaign to be ~$100 million, making him the third wealthiest Republican candidate behind Donald Trump and Vivek Ramaswamy, both billionaires. However, most of Burgum's net worth is held in family trusts and Microsoft stock and is not necessarily cash-on-hand. By November 8, 2023, Burgum had spent more than $12 million on his presidential campaign.

== Positions ==
=== Energy ===
==== Energy independence ====
Burgum stated that the issue of American energy independence is an issue of national security. Deriding what he called a "full-on assault of liquid fuels in this country" and has regularly criticized Joe Biden's push for more electric cars which increases U.S. reliance on Chinese-made car batteries. His solution is to open up Bureau of Land Management land for energy-related activities, such as rare earth metal mining and oil and natural gas drilling. As governor, Burgum has promised to make North Dakota carbon neutral by 2030 and although he has stated he will loosen regulations for the gas industry, he also stated that he is still committed to supporting clean energy projects.

==== CO2 Pipelines ====
Burgum has been a vocal supporter of carbon-capture pipelines while governor, going so far as to allow three natural gas companies, Summit Carbon Solutions, Navigator CO_{2} Ventures, and Wolf Carbon Solutions, to use eminent domain to seize land to install pipelines. These pipelines would transport excess Carbon dioxide captured from ethanol production plants in Iowa to facilities in North Dakota to store them deep underground. However, rural residents are opposed to the pipelines due to the fear of leaks, as well as the seizure of private land to create them. When confronted about the issue at a rally in Iowa, Burgum changed his position saying that he is fervently against eminent domain but insisted that carbon-capture was good for the economy and the environment, and that it would allow the continual use of traditional internal combustion automobiles indefinitely.

=== Foreign policy ===
Shortly after the start of the Gaza war, Burgum blamed the violence on the foreign policy of Joe Biden calling it appeasement and stated that:

"What I would like to say if I am Commander in Chief and when I'm your president is we won't be having these unprovoked attacks, we won't have Putin invading Ukraine, we won't have Hamas being funded by Iran because we would be pursuing a policy of peace through strength as opposed to a policy of appeasement"

Burgum has also stated that "Israel has been our strongest ally" in the Middle East over the last 50 years, and the United States should take more steps to actively aid the nation militarily. Burgum also criticized the Biden administration for allowing the transfer of $6 billion in frozen Iranian assets in September in exchange for the release of five prisoners from Iran. He also stated that if he was president he would consider sending U.S. troops to Israel to fight Hamas. Burgum has also criticized the Biden administration working with the Qatari government to create a diplomatic channel to Hamas as well as giving aid to Qatar, which he argued is funneled to Hamas and other Islamist terror organizations. Burgum suggested levering the military presence at the Al Udeid Air Base and the As Sayliyah Army Base as well as threatening to cut Qatar Airways off from the United States if the Qatari government doesn't break ties with Hamas.

=== Mental health ===
In an interview with ABC News' Linsey Davis, Burgum's wife, Kathryn, opened up about her past history of being suicidal and an alcoholic and stated that if she became First Lady that her top priority would be working to find a solution to the "behavior health crisis" and working to end stigma towards mental health as well as reworking insurance. Shortly afterwards, at an event in New Hampshire, Burgum stated that he believed addiction to be the root of most of America's problems, from crime, homelessness, and mental health. He has stated that if elected president he would overhaul the reimbursement systems for mental health care and would find a place for the private sector to get involved in funding solutions for substance use disorders. As governor, Burgum shifted some of North Dakota's prisons to look more akin to a mental health institution, a policy he stated he would attempt to emulate at a federal level.

=== Gun rights ===
Burgum supports the Second Amendment to the United States Constitution and the right to bear arms. He claims to be a lifelong hunter and a lifelong gun owner and has an "A" rating from the NRA Political Victory Fund. Burgum has neither stated if he will increase nor decrease gun regulations in the United States.

=== Abortions ===
Burgum describes himself as pro-life and supports a six-week abortion ban, even in the case of rape and incest. However, he stated that he would not support a federal abortion ban, and that the decision to ban or allow abortion should be determined by the individual states.

=== Entitlement ===
Burgum supports preserving existing entitlement programs saying they should be federally protected. He also supports improving federal efficiency to free up more money for entitlement. In 2021 Burgum signed a bill into law that exempted social security from North Dakota's state income tax.

=== Immigration ===
Burgum has sent North Dakota National Guard to the US-Mexico border to stem illegal immigration and blamed Joe Biden's policies for a recent surge in illegal immigration. He supports immigrants, even illegal immigrants, that are college educated either in their home nation or in the United States to come to the United States and supports creating more pathways for immigration for college educated individuals.
