= Office of Innovation and Improvement =

US government agency

The Office of Innovation and Improvement (OII) was a federal agency responsible for managing innovation grants and policy for the United States Department of Education. On March 13, 2017, Executive Order 13781—the Comprehensive Plan for Reorganizing the Executive Branch–merged the OII into the Office of Elementary and Secondary Education.

Grants managed by OII included:

- Investing in Innovation (i3)
- Arts in Education National Program
- Charter Schools Program Grants for Replication and Expansion of High-Quality Charter Schools
- Promise Neighborhoods
