= COVID-19 pandemic in Dakota =

COVID-19 pandemic in Dakota may refer to:

- COVID-19 pandemic in North Dakota
- COVID-19 pandemic in South Dakota
