= Lignite Energy Council =

American trade association

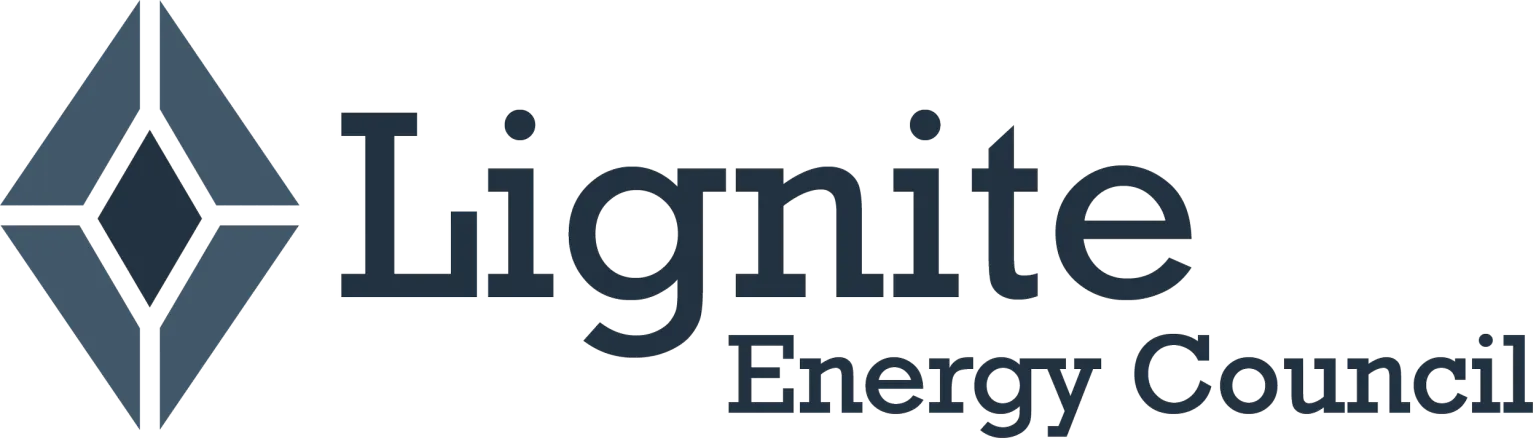
- Logo
- Abbreviation: LEC
- Formation: June 4, 1974; 52 years ago
- Headquarters: 1016 E Owens Ave, Bismarck, ND 58501
- Region served: United States
- Products: lignite
- Services: Education, lobbying, research, marketing
- President and CEO: Jason Bohrer
- Chairman of the Board of Directors: Robert “Mac” McLennan
- Website: lignite.com

The Lignite Energy Council (LEC) is a trade association for the coal industry in the United States whose self stated mission statement is to "protect, maintain and enhance development of our region’s abundant lignite resource" through four methods; education, government action, public relations and marketing, and research and development. To this end the LEC and its PACs have sought to influence both local politics in North Dakota and neighboring Minnesota, but also federal politics to promote the continuation and expansion of the coal industry.

== Activities ==
The LEC was founded on June 4, 1974. The LEC holds an annual meeting in Bismarck, North Dakota discussing the coal industry and policies. In 2023 the meeting revolved around opposing Joe Biden's green energy policies which the LEC views as a threat to business. Jason Bohrer, president and CEO of the council stated "The Biden Administration has imposed regulations that threaten some of those relationships, as well as threatens the way that the industry does business." The group has been compared to the North Dakota Unmanned Autonomous Systems Council and the Petroleum Council.

The LEC is heavily involved in North Dakotan politics, as the coal industry is a $5.7 billion per year industry in the state as of 2023. The LEC has denounced efforts to call the coal industry "dirty" or "polluters" arguing that the coal industry is both environmentally friendly, and necessary for the United States to get a leg up on OPEC. To this end the LEC supports and finances research into Carbon Capture technologies. Additionally, the LEC supports electric cars such as Teslas, arguing that coal power plants are more environmentally friendly than millions of cars and have financed the construction of electric car charging stations across North Dakota.

The LEC is a supporter of company towns, such as Noonan, created by the Baukol-Noonan company. The LEC supports the continued operation and expansion of the Coal Creek Station arguing that freedom, a vibrant working class and the energy industry as a whole is only possible through coal. The LEC also promotes efforts to catch fly ash and to repurpose it for various industrial uses. The LEC states that they have 3,000 direct employees and another 13,000 indirect employees as of 2023. In 2024 the LEC commissioned a study by North Dakota State University which found that the coal industry provides 7,310 jobs in coal conversion (coal power plants), 3,400 jobs in mining, and 1,610 jobs in transmission while contributing $2 billion in GDP with a gross business volume of $5.49 billion including adjacent industries.

The LEC collaborates with the University of North Dakota to offer classes and research on the presence of neodymium, lanthanum, and other heavy metals being present in lignite. Most studies about the economic impact of the coal industry in North Dakota are also commissioned by the LEC.

The LEC is staunchly in favor of carbon capture initiatives, oftentimes sending op-eds to local newspapers arguing in favor of them, as well as commissioning polls to gauge the public's opinion on carbon capture. The LEC has also attacked individuals and organizations that are opposed to carbon capture, such as North Dakota News Cooperative reporter Michael Standaert who argued that the long term climate impacts of carbon capture, that they aren't cost effective and do little to actually reduce C02 output. The LEC argues that Standaert and other opponents are "ignorant" and "uninformed" and follow a position of "disingenuous opposition."

The LEC is strongly opposed to the existence of, or expansion of, wind farms in North Dakota, which as of 2016 contributed 18% of North Dakota's electricity, claiming it is a direct threat to the coal industry and have sued coal plants that shut down due to lack of electricity demand due to increased wind farms.

In 2015 the LEC organized and financed protests to the Clean Power Plan claiming that North Dakota was being singled out due to the state's reliance on Coal.

In 2016 the LEC gave curated tours of coal mines to various Republican candidates for local legislation including Glen Baltrusch, Dennis Fred, and Albert Krueger to promote just how "clean" and "environmentally friendly" open pit coal mines are.

In 2020 LEC chairman David Andahl won an election to the North Dakota House of Representatives for the 8th district as a Republican but died before he was sworn in.

In June 2024 the LEC petitioned against the EPA introducing more stringent MATS regulations. When the regulations still went into force the LEC stated "that Congress is broken" claiming that the emissions reduction mandate was unpopular. The LEC would be joined in their protests by the States of North Dakota, South Dakota and West Virginia.

The LEC supported the Fair Access to Banking Act proposed by Thom Tillis which would have prevented banks from discriminating against constitutionally-protected industries which was proposed after JP Morgan Chase announced they will refuse financial services to coal producers. The proposed act never left committee.

The LEC partially financed Doug Burgum's 2024 bid for President. Burgum would go on to be named Trump's secretary of the interior and has stated he will expand the American coal industry.

In 2025, in collaboration with the Petroleum Council, the LEC advocated for an expansion of resource extraction from the Bakken formation for America to secure the "leading edge of a low-carbon energy economy."

== Criticism ==
The "Lignite Energy Council Teacher’s Seminar" has been described as "A Bizarre Coal Industry Propaganda Program" as it is a program designed to convince teachers to teach kids that coal is “vitally important” and that includes worksheets for kids that identify carbon dioxide as “vital to plant life.” The seminar is paid by LEC member ratepayers and is therefore free for the participating schools. The programs materials include several worksheets which claim coal does not create pollution, nor does coal power plants have any adverse effect on the environment. The LEC has a large footprint in the North Dakotan public school system, financing "Teacher of the Year" and other superlative awards as well as running several grant programs. Teachers are granted tours of coal power plants as part of the LEC's "Lignite Education Seminar" to educate teachers on "lignite’s economic impact and the important environmental issues that are affecting the lignite industry."

The LEC is heavily criticized in Democratic-dominated Minnesota for their support of Republican efforts to block "clean energy" legislation through the LEC's Coalition for a Secure Energy Future PAC. Due to its influence on Minnesota's politics, the organization has also been criticized due to being North Dakota based, and receiving funding from the North Dakota Industrial Commission. When Minnesota passed legislation to become carbon neutral by 2040, the LEC considered suing the entire state due to the move being perceived as a threat to North Dakota's coal industry. The LEC has extensively used its PACs to reduce and weaken Minnesota's climate legislation.

In 2024 when the North Dakota Republican Party was adopting its positions for that year, there was a massive grassroots movement against carbon capture via a carbon pipeline that would transport other state's C02 to North Dakota due to the proposed usage of eminent domain to seize land from farmers to build the pipeline while some simply opposed the measure due to climate change denial and not seeing the need to reduce C02 emissions. The LEC and its PACs mobilized a massive campaign to sway delegates to adopt the carbon pipeline into the party's positions, arguing that any North Dakota Republican that didn't support the measure had fallen out of line with Donald Trump.

The LEC would be criticized by Keith Ellison, the Attorney General of Minnesota, due to utilities companies financing the group, meaning that the ratepayers for these utilities are in turn financing a political organization. Ellison's office also submitted testimony to the Minnesota Public Utilities Commission due to a Minnesota based company, Otter Tail Power, donating to the group, stating that the LEC does not benefit electric ratepayers. Ellison also objected to the North Dakota-centric outlook of the LEC, as the LEC primarily supports North Dakota based coal mines and power plants. Otter Tail had $47,545 from its ratepayers paid to the LEC. Other companies that have spent ratepayer money to the LEC include; Minnesota Power, Montana-Dakota Utilities, Great River Energy, Minnkota Power Cooperative, and Basin Electric. Ellison also highlighted that the LEC's goals may not align with the politics of the ratepayers that were made to pay dues to the LEC, highlighting the LEC blocking clean energy policies and supporting Donald Trump's effort to replace the Clean Power Plan.

Following John Oliver joking about the coal industry, the LEC denounced Oliver's comments about the coal industry damaging the environment, saying that coal mines and coal power plants provide jobs.

== PACS ==
- Lignite Energy Council PAC: The LEC's flagship PAC that operates mostly in North Dakota and Minnesota that promotes "Legislative and Regulatory Advocacy" in favor of the coal industry and to " influence national energy policies that align with the industry’s goals."
- Coalition for a Secure Energy Future PAC: Operates in the Upper Midwest and seeks to "educate businesses, policymakers, and residents" about the "benefits" of continued operation and even expansion of coal power plants as an "all-of-the-above energy" solution.
