= 2020 North Dakota elections =

- November 3, 2020
- Registered: 581,379
- Turnout: 62.65%

North Dakota held two statewide elections in 2020: a primary election on Tuesday, June 9, and a general election on Tuesday, November 3. In addition, each township elected officers on Tuesday, March 17, and each school district held their elections on a date of their choosing between April 1 and June 30.

== Primary election ==
On Tuesday, June 9, North Dakota voters selected which candidates for statewide and legislative office would appear on the November ballot. Because North Dakota does not have party registration, any eligible voter may vote in any one party's primary election. In addition, any number of constitutional amendments, initiated measures, or referred measures may be placed on the ballot by petition or legislative action.

The State of North Dakota does not provide for a presidential primary, but the Democratic–NPL Party held a firehouse caucus on March 10, 2020, to select delegates to the Democratic National Convention. As of June 13, 2019, the Republican Party had yet to announce plans for selecting delegates to the Republican National Convention.

== General election ==
On Tuesday, November 3, concurrent with other statewide elections across the United States, North Dakota voters selected three electors to the United States Electoral College to elect the president of the United States, one United States representative to represent North Dakota's at-large congressional district, their governor (alongside lieutenant governor), and a number of other statewide executive and judicial officials. Voters who lived in even-numbered legislative districts also selected their representatives to the North Dakota House of Representatives and North Dakota Senate. Finally, voters may face any number of constitutional amendments, initiated measures, or referred measures placed on the ballot by petition.

=== Federal offices ===
==== United States president ====
North Dakota voters selected a presidential candidate on their ballots; the candidate with the most votes would send their preselected electors to represent North Dakota in the Electoral College. The state of North Dakota has three electoral votes in the Electoral College, and so would send three electors.

==== United States representative ====
Freshman incumbent Republican Kelly Armstrong ran for re-election.

2020 North Dakota's at-large congressional district election
Party	Candidate	Votes	%
Republican	Kelly Armstrong (incumbent)	245,229	68.96%
Democratic–NPL	Zach Raknerud	97,970	27.55%
Libertarian	Steven Peterson	12,024	3.38%
Write-in		375	0.11%
Turnout		355,598	61.16%

=== State offices ===
==== Governor and lieutenant governor ====
Republican incumbent Governor Doug Burgum and Lieutenant Governor Brent Sanford, both serving their first terms in statewide elected office, ran together for re-election.

2020 North Dakota gubernatorial election
Party	Candidate	Votes	%
Republican	Doug Burgum (incumbent)	235,479	65.84%
Democratic–NPL	Shelley Lenz	90,789	25.38%
Libertarian	DuWayne Hendrickson	13,853	3.87%
Write-in		17,538	4.90%
Turnout		357,659	61.52%

==== State treasurer ====
Results by county Beadle: 50–60%; 60–70%; 70–80%; 80–90%; Haugen: 60–70%; 70–80%

Incumbent Republican Kelly Schmidt, the longest-serving treasurer in the state's history, announced she would not seek re-election in 2020. In the primary, State Representative Thomas Beadle was elected to fill the open seat.

2020 North Dakota state treasurer election
Party	Candidate	Votes	%
Republican	Thomas Beadle	227,583	65.60%
Democratic–NPL	Mark Haugen	117,790	33.95%
Write-in		1,533	0.44%
Turnout		346,906	59.67%

==== State auditor ====
Results by county Gallion: 50–60%; 60–70%; 70–80%; 80–90%; Hart: 60–70%; 70–80%

In the state auditor race, incumbent Republican Josh Gallion, who provoked lawmakers' ire with his reviews in his first term, ran for re-election.

Polling

Poll source	Date(s) administered	Sample size (Note: Key: A – all adults RV – registered voters LV – likely voters V – unclear)	Margin of error	Josh Gallion (R)	Patrick Hart (D)	Undecided
DFM Research/North Dakota Voters First	September 12–16, 2020	500 (LV)	± 4.5%	42%	26%	32%

Result

2020 North Dakota state auditor election
Party	Candidate	Votes	%
Republican	Josh Gallion (incumbent)	234,293	67.69%
Democratic–NPL	Patrick Hart	111,243	32.14%
Write-in		579	0.17%
Turnout		346,115	59.53%

==== Insurance commissioner ====
Results by county Godfread: 80–90%; 90–100%

In the election for insurance commissioner, incumbent Republican Jon Godfread ran for re-election unopposed.

2020 North Dakota insurance commissioner election
Party	Candidate	Votes	%
Republican	Jon Godfread (incumbent)	295,095	97.74%
Write-in		6,813	2.26%
Turnout		301,908	51.93%

==== Superintendent of Public Instruction ====
Results by county Baesler: 50–60%; 60–70%; Dick: 50–60%

The election for superintendent of Public Instruction in North Dakota is nonpartisan. Incumbent Kirsten Baesler, a registered Republican, ran for re-election.

2020 North Dakota superintendent of Public Instruction election
Party	Candidate	Votes	%
Nonpartisan	Kirsten Baesler (incumbent)	192,835	59.13%
Nonpartisan	Brandt Dick	130,280	39.95%
Write-in		3,005	0.92%
Turnout		326,120	56.09%

==== Public Service commissioner ====
Results by county Kroshus: 50–60%; 60–70%; 70–80%; 80–90%; Buchmann: 60–70%

One of three seats in the state Public Service Commission went up for election. Incumbent Republican Brian Kroshus ran for re-election to a full six-year term.

2020 North Dakota Public Service Commission election
Party	Candidate	Votes	%
Republican	Brian Kroshus (incumbent)	231,898	67.62%
Democratic–NPL	Casey Buchmann	110,493	32.22%
Write-in		552	0.16%
Turnout		342,943	58.99%

==== Justice of the Supreme Court ====
Results by county Jensen: 90–100%

Chief Justice Jon J. Jensen ran unopposed in a nonpartisan election to a ten-year term.

2020 North Dakota Supreme Court election
Party	Candidate	Votes	%
Nonpartisan	Jon J. Jensen (incumbent)	290,346	99.08%
Write-in		2,703	0.92%
Turnout		293,049	50.41%

==== State legislative races ====
23 seats in the North Dakota Senate and 47 seats in the North Dakota House of Representatives were up for election. Voters in all even-numbered districts saw those races on their ballots. The outcome of this election could affect partisan balance during post-census redistricting.

Among the candidates for the North Dakota House, Republican candidate David Andahl, who died due to COVID-19 in October 2020, eventually won a seat in the North Dakota House of Representatives.

=== Measures ===
Voters faced any number of constitutional measures and statutes initiated or referred to the ballot by petition.

==== Measure 1 ====
Polling

Poll source	Date(s) administered	Sample size	Margin of error	For Measure 1	Against Measure 1	Undecided
DFM Research/North Dakota Voters First	September 12–16, 2020	500 (LV)	± 4.5%	32%	46%	22%

Result

Measure 1 results by county No: 80–90%; 70–80%; 60–70%; 50–60%

Constitutional Measure No. 1 Relating to the state board of higher education
Choice	Votes	%
For	91,706	27.48
Against	242,004	72.52
Total	333,710	100.00
Registered voters/turnout	581,379	57.40

==== Measure 2 ====
Polling

Poll source	Date(s) administered	Sample size	Margin of error	For Measure 2	Against Measure 2	Undecided
DFM Research/North Dakota Voters First	September 12–16, 2020	500 (LV)	± 4.5%	33%	39%	28%

Result

Measure 2 results by county No: 70–80%; 60–70%; 50–60%

Constitutional Measure No. 2 Relating to initiated constitutional amendments
Choice	Votes	%
For	125,460	38.39
Against	201,343	61.61
Total	326,803	100.00
Registered voters/turnout	581,379	56.21

== Notes ==
Partisan clients
