= Office of Career, Technical, and Adult Education =

The Office of Career, Technical, and Adult Education (OCTAE) formerly Office of Vocational and Adult Education (OVAE) is a subdivision of the United States Department of Education. OCTAE falls under the supervision of the Undersecretary, who oversees policies, programs and activities related to vocational and adult education, postsecondary education, college aid and the President's financial reforms for the Pell Grant program.

OCTAE's director has the rank of Assistant Secretary and serves as the principal adviser to the Secretary of Education on matters related to high school, career technical and adult education and lifelong learning as well as community colleges, workforce and economic development. The director also represents the Department at national and international meetings related to vocational and adult education. The Office administers, coordinates, and recommends policy for improving quality and excellence of programs related to the Office's focus areas.

OCTAE's programs fall into four general areas:

- Adult education and literacy, represented within OCTAE by the Division of Adult Education and Literacy (DAEL)
- Career and technical education, represented within OCTAE by the Division of Academic and Technical Education (DATE)
- Community colleges
- Correctional and re-entry education

Programs under DAEL include the Literacy Information and Communication System (LINCS), launched in 1994 and transferred to the authority of OCTAE in 2010, which encourages adult literacy.

== See also ==
- Title 34 of the Code of Federal Regulations

== Sources ==
- OCTAE home page at https://www2.ed.gov/about/offices/list/ovae/index.html
