= Levi Bachmeier =

American politician

20th North Dakota Superintendent of Public Instruction
- Incumbent
- Assumed office November 24, 2025
- Governor: Kelly Armstrong
- Preceded by: Kirsten Baesler

Personal details
- Born: West Fargo, North Dakota, U.S.
- Party: Republican
- Spouse: Rachel Baughman (m. 2019)
- Children: 2
- Education: Concordia College (BA)

Levi Bachmeier is the North Dakota Superintendent of Public Instruction, a position he has held since November 24, 2025, after being appointed by Governor Kelly Armstrong to the fill the vacancy caused by Kirsten Baesler's federal appointment.

== Education & career ==
A native of West Fargo, North Dakota, Bachmeier received his bachelor's degree in social studies education from Concordia College in 2014. Bachmeier then taught at the Pine Ridge Indian Reservation in South Dakota for two years before becoming the Director of Advance and Operations for Doug Burgum's 2016 gubernatorial campaign and later becoming an education policy advisor for Governor Burgum.

In 2019, Bachmeier was hired as the Business Manager for the West Fargo Public Schools district, a position he held till becoming superintendent. In 2024, Bachmeier was selected by Burgum to be on the State Board of Public School Education. And the following year, Bachmeier was one of two selected by newly elected governor Kelly Armstrong to be on the North Dakota State Board of Higher Education.

== Superintendent of Public Instruction ==
On October 21, 2025, governor Armstrong announced his intention to appoint Bachmeier to be the 20th North Dakota Superintendent of Public Instruction, replacing incumbent Kirsten Baesler as she was confirmed by the senate for a federal position. Due to the 2025 United States government shutdown, Baesler could not be sworn into her federal position, and so Bachmeier would have to wait before entering office. Bachmeier would take office on November 24, 2025.

The position will be up for special election in 2026, and again in the regularly scheduled 2028 election. The superintendent's office is a nonpartisan position, but candidates can seek political party endorsement. Bachmeier has described himself as a conservative but has stated he isn't fully sure if he would run for any party endorsement. However, he stated he does intend to run in 2026 to complete the term.

During his appointment announcement, Bachmeier stated coming into the position that he believed education policy and politics were becoming "tribal" and that he believed "common sense, hard work, and high expectations" could fix the growing issues and distrust in education.

Before taking office, Bachmeier signaled his support for a plan weighed by the higher education board to reduce the number of credit hours required for a bachelor's degree at state colleges down from 120 to 90 hours. However, he also stated he was in support of attaching something reminiscent of a "warning label" to these degrees. After taking office, Baachmeier stated his intention to visit every school district in the state.

Bachmeir sought a 2-year unexpired term in 2026. He appeared on the June Ballot, receiving 55.1% of the vote, 29.9% for Tracy Layne Foss, and 14.4% for Charles Tuttle in the unofficial results. He won 51 counties with Foss only winning two. Bachmeir will face off against Foss in November.

== Personal life ==
Bachmeier has been married to his wife, Rachel, since 2019. She is the Dean of Students at West Fargo High School. The couple have two children.

Political offices
Preceded by Kirsten Baesler	North Dakota Superintendent of Public Instruction; 2025–present	Incumbent
