= Title 34 of the Code of Federal Regulations =

U.S. federal rules and regulations on education

CFR Title 34 - Education is one of fifty titles comprising the United States Code of Federal Regulations (CFR). Title 34 is the principal set of rules and regulations issued by federal agencies of the United States regarding education. It is available in digital and printed form, and can be referenced online using the Electronic Code of Federal Regulations (e-CFR).

== Structure ==
The table of contents, as reflected in the e-CFR updated February 28, 2014, is as follows:

Volume	Chapter	Parts	Regulatory Entity
1		1-99	Subtitle A--Office of the Secretary, Department of Education
	I	100-199	Office for Civil Rights, Department of Education
	II	200-299	Office of Elementary and Secondary Education, Department of Education
2	III	300-399	Office of Special Education and Rehabilitative Services, Department of Education
3	IV	400-499	Office of Vocational and Adult Education, Department of Education
	V	500-599	Office of Bilingual Education and Minority Languages Affairs, Department of Education
	VI	600-679	Office of Post-secondary Education, Department of Education
4		680-699	Office of Post-secondary Education, Department of Education
	VII	700-799 [Reserved]	Office of Educational Research and Improvement, Department of Education
	XI	1100-1199	National Institute for Literacy
	XII	1200-1299	National Council on Disability
