= Department of Education Organization Act =

1979 U.S. federal law establishing the Department of Education

- Long title: An act to establish a Department of Education, and for other purposes.
- Enacted by: the 96th United States Congress

Citations
- Public law: Pub. L. 96–88
- Statutes at Large: 93 Stat. 668

Legislative history
- Introduced in the Senate as S. 210 by Abraham Ribicoff (D–CT) on January 24, 1979; Committee consideration by Senate Governmental Affairs; Passed the Senate on April 30, 1979 (72–21); Signed into law by President Jimmy Carter on October 17, 1979

Major amendments
- No Child Left Behind Act of 2002

The Department of Education Organization Act is a United States federal law enacted in 1979, which created the Department of Education. The new department was split off from the Department of Health, Education, and Welfare, which the Act also renamed the Department of Health and Human Services.

== Purpose ==
Under the Department of Education Organization Act, the department's mission is to:

- Strengthen the federal commitment to assuring access to equal educational opportunity for every individual;
- Supplement and complement the efforts of states, the local school systems and other instrumentalities of the states, the private sector, public and private nonprofit educational research institutions, community-based organizations, parents, and students to improve the quality of education;
- Encourage the increased involvement of the public, parents, and students in federal education programs;
- Promote improvements in the quality and usefulness of education through federally supported research, evaluation, and sharing of information;
- Increase the accountability of federal education programs to the president, the Congress, and the public.

== Voting ==
In the Senate, 69 voted in favor and 22 voted against separating education from the Department of Health, Education, and Welfare. In the House of Representatives, 215 voted in favor and 201 voted against. President Carter signed the bill on October 17, 1979.
