= Kirsten Baesler =

American politician

Assistant Secretary of Education for Elementary and Secondary Education
- Incumbent
- Assumed office November 24, 2025
- President: Donald Trump
- Preceded by: Ian Rosenblum (acting)

19th North Dakota Superintendent of Public Instruction
- In office January 1, 2013 – November 24, 2025
- Governor: Jack Dalrymple; Doug Burgum; Kelly Armstrong
- Preceded by: Wayne Sanstead
- Succeeded by: Levi Bachmeier

Personal details
- Born: March 30, 1969 (age 57) Flasher, North Dakota, U.S.
- Party: Republican
- Education: Bismarck State College (AA, AS); Minot State University (BA); Valley City State University (MEd)
- Website: Official website

Kirsten Baesler (born March 30, 1969) is an American politician and government official serving as the Assistant Secretary for Elementary and Secondary Education since 2025. Baesler previously served as the North Dakota Superintendent of Public Instruction, a position she held from her election in 2012 until 2025.

Baesler was nominated by president Donald Trump to be Assistant Secretary for Elementary and Secondary Education, succeeding acting assistant secretary Ian Rosenblum. She was confirmed on October 7, 2025, but her swearing in was delayed due to the 2025 United States federal government shutdown. She was sworn in by United States Secretary of Education Linda McMahon on November 24, 2025.

== Early life & education ==
Baesler is originally from Flasher, North Dakota.

Baesler received two associate's degrees from Bismarck State College, a bachelor's degree in education at Minot State University, and then a master's degree from Valley City State University.

== Career ==
Baesler began her career as a school library assistant, she later became a library media specialist, eventually working her way to up to an assistant principal in Bismarck, North Dakota. At the time of her election, Baesler was serving as president of the Mandan School Board, after serving since 2004.

== North Dakota Superintendent of Public Instruction ==
In 2012, Baesler announced she would run for North Dakota Superintendent of Public Instruction, with a later endorsement from the North Dakota Republican Party, she went on to win the general with 55% of the vote. She would win reelection in 2016, 2020, and 2024 with no less than 50% of the vote each time.

Since taking office, Baesler has frequently attempted to boost the quality of the states math and science standards.

On February 15, 2015, Baesler was arrested for alleged misdemeanor simple assault on her fiancé with a glass jar during an reportedly drunken argument. Despite conflicting reports from both Baesler and her fiancé, any charges were dropped in March.

During the COVID-19 pandemic, Baesler announced that the state would allow the local school districts to decide whether their graduation ceremonies would be held in-person or virtual.

On March 10, 2020, Baesler was charged with a DUI. In a statement, Baesler said “I ask that you please don’t allow this mistake of mine to undo all the good work we have begun and all we have yet to accomplish together. Today I commit to you that I will work diligently – one day at a time — to earn back your trust.” She would later serve 360 days probation for the charge.

During her 2024 reelection bid, Baesler lost the NDGOP endorsement to primary candidate Jim Bartlett. Despite this, she still won reelection.

In 2025, Baesler signaled her support for charter schools in the state and supported legislation passed by governor Kelly Armstrong that would allow for them to operate in North Dakota.

== Assistant Secretary for Elementary and Secondary Education ==
On February 12, 2025, Baesler was nominated by President Donald Trump to be the Assistant Secretary for Elementary and Secondary Education in his administration under Secretary of Education Linda McMahon.

Baesler's nomination was advanced by the Senate Committee on Health, Education, Labor, and Pensions in a 12-11 vote on May 22. And on October 7, Baesler along with over 100 other nominees were confirmed in a 51-47 vote by the United States Senate. Baesler was not immediately sworn in due to the 2025 United States federal government shutdown.

When the shutdown ended on November 13, 2025, Baesler filed a letter for retirement as Superintendent. Joined by her three adult sons, Baesler was sworn in by Education Secretary Linda McMahon in a ceremony on November 24, 2025. She officially retired as North Dakota Superintendent that same day.

== Electoral history ==
2012 North Dakota Superintendent of Public Instruction Primary
Candidate	Votes	%
Kirsten Baesler	41,343	37.29
Tracy Potter	35,949	32.42
Max Laird	33,371	30.10
Write-in	210	0.19

2012 North Dakota Superintendent of Public Instruction Election
Candidate	Votes	%
Kirsten Baesler	154,177	55.05
Tracy Potter	124,807	44.57
Write-in	1,069	0.38

2016 North Dakota Superintendent of Public Instruction election
Candidate	Votes	%
Kirsten Baesler	220,079	74.60
Joe Chiang	73,350	24.86
Write-in	1,598	0.54
Total votes	295,027	100.00

2020 North Dakota Superintendent of Public Instruction election
Party	Candidate	Votes	%
Nonpartisan	Kirsten Baesler (incumbent)	192,835	59.13%
Nonpartisan	Brandt Dick	130,280	39.95%
Write-in		3,005	0.92%
Turnout		326,120	56.09%

2024 North Dakota Superintendent of Public Instruction Primary
Party	Candidate	Votes	%
Nonpartisan	Kirsten Baesler (incumbent)	59,170	54.88%
Nonpartisan	Jason Heitkamp	23,837	22.11%
Nonpartisan	Jim Bartlett	21,216	19.68%
Nonpartisan	Darko Draganic	3,320	3.08%
Write-in		280	0.26%
Turnout		107,823	20.26%

2024 North Dakota Superintendent of Public Instruction election
Party	Candidate	Votes	%
Nonpartisan	Kirsten Baesler (incumbent)	185,318	56.90%
Nonpartisan	Jason Heitkamp	138,085	42.39%
Write-in		2,316	0.71%
Turnout		325,719	62.61%

Political offices
Preceded by Wayne Sanstead	North Dakota Superintendent of Public Instruction; 2013–2025	Succeeded by Levi Bachmeier
