= FICE code =

The FICE code is a six-digit identification number formerly used to identify institutions of higher education in the United States. It originated in the early 1960s to track institutions that conducted business with the U.S. Office of Education. The acronym derives from the Federal Interagency Committee on Education.

== History ==
Although the FICE code has been phased out of most federal data systems — such as the Integrated Postsecondary Education Data System (IPEDS) — and replaced by the Office of Postsecondary Education (OPE) ID, it has continued to appear in some state-level data systems. As of the mid-2010s and beyond, agencies in states such as Texas have continued to reference the FICE code for institutional reporting and administrative purposes.

== Bibliography ==
=== References ===
- "Additional Public Data" (PDF) – via UT Austin: WordPress for Texas, custom WordPress distribution provided by the UT Austin for its web hosting service, Pantheon. It's a UT-branded version of WordPress designed to be used on the Pantheon platform.
- "IPEDS Glossary" (PDF). Integrated Postsecondary Education Data System → National Center for Education Statistics. p. 13.
1. "2016–17 Survey Materials: Glossary" (PDF) (Archived from the original on February 9, 2017). August 24, 2016. Archived from the original (PDF) on 9 February 2017 – via Wayback Machine.
