= David Andahl =

American politician (1964–2020)

Member-elect of the North Dakota House of Representatives from the 8th district
- In office Died before taking office
- Preceded by: Jeff Delzer
- Succeeded by: Jeff Delzer

Personal details
- Born: David Dean Andahl; October 30, 1964 Bismarck, North Dakota, U.S.
- Died: October 5, 2020 (aged 55) North Dakota, U.S.
- Cause of death: COVID-19
- Party: Republican
- Education: Bismarck State College (AS)
- Occupation: Politician, rancher, land developer, driver
- Website: davidandahl.com

David Dean Andahl (October 30, 1964 – October 5, 2020) was an American politician, rancher, land developer and driver. In the 2020 election, Andahl defeated longtime incumbent Jeff Delzer in the Republican primary for a seat in the North Dakota House of Representatives, but died a month before the November general election due to complications from COVID-19 during the COVID-19 pandemic in North Dakota, at age 55. Andahl remained on the ballot and was elected posthumously.

== Early life and education ==
Andahl was born on October 30, 1964, in Bismarck, North Dakota, to Ronald and Patricia Andahl and graduated from Century High School. He received his associate degree from Bismarck State College and studied animal science at North Dakota State University.

== Career ==
He was a farmer, contractor and rancher. Andahl spent sixteen years on the Burleigh County Planning and Zoning Commission, and chaired it for eight years. A Republican, he was a part of the Donald Trump 2020 presidential campaign. At the time of his house election he was the sitting chairman of the Lignite Energy Council, a lobbying and pressure group for the coal industry in North Dakota.

=== 2020 North Dakota House election ===
In the 2020 election, Andahl was a candidate for the North Dakota House of Representatives. In the Republican primary, Andahl defeated Jeff Delzer. North Dakota's Governor, Doug Burgum, and junior Senator Kevin Cramer both endorsed his run for the state house.

In October 2020, Andahl contracted COVID-19 and died from its complications at the age of 55. Following Andahl's death, North Dakota Attorney General Wayne Stenehjem issued an opinion stating that if a candidate wins an election posthumously, the result would be a vacancy and state law gives the choice of his replacement to the district's chapter of the Republican Party.

On November 4, Governor Doug Burgum appointed Wade Boeshans to the seat, arguing that since no other North Dakota law applied to the situation, he was empowered to make an appointment by a provision of the North Dakota state constitution stating that the governor "may fill a vacancy in any office by appointment if no other method is provided by this constitution or by law". The North Dakota Legislative Assembly sued to block the appointment, arguing that the Governor had exceeded his authority; the legislature instead appointed incumbent Jeff Delzer to the seat. On November 24, 2020, the North Dakota Supreme Court ruled that Burgum does not have the authority to appoint a person to fill the vacant house seat.
