= Office of Elementary and Secondary Education =

Division of the United States Department of Education

The Office of Elementary and Secondary Education is a division of the United States Department of Education. Its purpose is to promote academic excellence, enhance educational opportunities and equity for all of America's children and families, and to improve the quality of teaching and learning by providing leadership, technical assistance, and financial things.

== Responsibilities ==
The Office is responsible for directing, coordinating, and recommending policy for programs designed to:

- Assist State and local educational agencies to improve the achievement of elementary and secondary school students.
- Help ensure equal access to services leading to such improvement for all children, particularly children who are educationally disadvantaged, Native American, children of migrant workers, or homeless.
- Foster educational improvement at the State and local levels.
- Provide financial assistance to local educational agencies whose local revenues are affected by Federal activities.

== Organization ==
The Office of Elementary and Secondary Education is under the supervision of the Assistant Secretary for Elementary and Secondary Education, who reports to the Secretary and Deputy Secretary. The Assistant Secretary for Elementary and Secondary Education serves as principal adviser to the Secretary of Education on all matters related to elementary and secondary education.

The current Assistant Secretary is Frank Brogan, who has been serving since his Senate confirmation on June 25, 2018. Previous office holders include: Ann Whalen (2015–2017), Deborah Delisle (2012–2015), and Thelma Melendez (2009–2011).

The Office includes 6 Departments:

- Student Achievement and School Accountability Programs
- Office of Migrant Education
- Impact Aid Programs
- Office of Indian Education
- School Support and Technology Programs
- Academic Improvement and Teacher Quality Programs

== See also ==
- Title 34 of the Code of Federal Regulations
