= 2004 North Dakota gubernatorial election =

- November 2, 2004
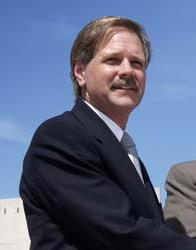

Nominee	John Hoeven	Joe Satrom
Party	Republican	Democratic–NPL
Running mate	Jack Dalrymple	Deb Mathern
Popular vote	220,803	84,877
Percentage	71.26%	27.39%
- County results Hoeven: 50–60% 60–70% 70–80% 80–90% Satrom: 50–60%
Governor before election
John Hoeven
Republican
Elected Governor
John Hoeven
Republican

The 2004 North Dakota gubernatorial election took place on November 2, 2004 for the post of governor of North Dakota. Incumbent Republican governor John Hoeven was easily re-elected, defeating Democratic-NPL former state senator Joe Satrom, outperforming (by 16.51%) the victory margin of George W. Bush in the concurrent presidential race.

== Republican nomination ==
Incumbent governor John Hoeven was unopposed for the Republican nomination, and accepted the nomination by stating that the economy of North Dakota was his priority.

== Democratic-NPL nomination ==
Former state senator Joe Satrom defeated North Dakota House of Representatives minority leader Merle Boucher for the Democratic-NPL nomination. Satrom began campaigning for the nomination almost a year before the North Dakota Democratic-NPL Convention would choose the party's candidate for governor. Boucher announced his candidacy in December 2003, but struggled to make up ground against Satrom.

The two candidates debated at the University of North Dakota, just before the convention, with education and the future of the state's youth the main topics. The Democratic-NPL Convention voted by 632 to 341 to endorse Satrom as their candidate for governor.

== General election ==
=== Campaign ===
The two candidates met in three debates during the campaign. During the final debate on October 9, 2004, they clashed over a smoking ban, outmigration, and a proposed constitutional amendment to ban same-sex marriage.

Satrom called for North Dakota to introduce a $1,000 donation limit for individuals and political action committees, to avoid any perception of conflict of interest. Hoeven named education, growth, and jobs as his priorities, but faced anger from some hunting groups over changes to hunting seasons.

Opinion polls gave Hoeven a strong lead over Satrom, with one in October 2004 showing Hoeven at 70% as against 22% for Satrom. Hoeven raised far more money than his challenger, and even a normally Democratic-supporting teachers' union, the North Dakota Education Association, endorsed Hoeven for governor.

=== Predictions ===
Source	Ranking	As of
Sabato's Crystal Ball	Safe R	November 1, 2004

=== Results ===
North Dakota gubernatorial election, 2004
Party	Candidate	Votes	%	±%
Republican	John Hoeven (incumbent); Jack Dalrymple (incumbent)	220,803	71.26	▲16.23
Democratic–NPL	Joe Satrom; Deb Mathern	84,877	27.39	▼17.58
Libertarian	Roland Riemers; Mitchell Sanderson	4,193	1.35	N/A
Majority		135,926	43.87	▲33.81
Total votes		309,873	100.00	
Republican hold				

==== Counties that flipped from Democratic to Republican ====
- Divide (largest city: Crosby)
- Benson (largest CDP: Fort Totten)
- Name (largest city: Stanley)
- Nelson (largest city: Lakota)
- Ransom (largest city: Lisbon)
- Richland (largest city: Wahpeton)
- Sargent (largest city: Gwinner)
- Steele (largest city: Finley)
- Towner (largest city: Cando)
- Traill (largest city: Mayville)
