= 2012 North Dakota gubernatorial election =

- November 6, 2012
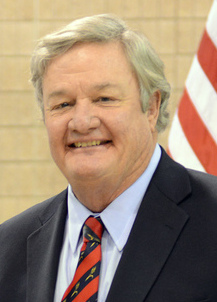

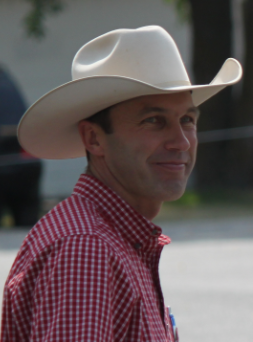
Nominee	Jack Dalrymple	Ryan Taylor
Party	Republican	Democratic–NPL
Running mate	Drew Wrigley	Ellen Chaffee
Popular vote	200,525	109,048
Percentage	63.10%	34.31%
- County results Dalrymple: 50–60% 60–70% 70–80% Taylor: 50–60% 60–70% 70–80%
Governor before election
Jack Dalrymple
Republican
Elected Governor
Jack Dalrymple
Republican

The 2012 North Dakota gubernatorial election was held on November 6, 2012, to elect a governor and lieutenant governor of North Dakota, concurrently with the 2012 U.S. presidential election, elections to the United States Senate, elections to the United States House of Representatives, and various state and local elections. Incumbent Governor Jack Dalrymple succeeded to the office when then-Governor John Hoeven resigned to take a seat in the U.S. Senate in 2010. Dalrymple, a member of the Republican Party, won election to a full term. Ryan Taylor was the Democratic nominee. Dalrymple prevailed with 63% of the vote; he declined to seek re-election in 2016.

== Republican Party ==
=== Candidates ===
The North Dakota Republican Party selected incumbent Governor Jack Dalrymple as their nominee. Incumbent Lieutenant Governor Drew Wrigley was his running mate. Dalrymple defeated Fargo architect Paul Sorum, who later ran as an independent.

==== Declined ====
- Ed Schafer, former governor of North Dakota and former U.S. secretary of agriculture

== Libertarian Party ==
=== Candidates ===
The Libertarian Party of North Dakota selected Roland Riemers, a real estate investor, failed 2010 candidate for Grand Forks County sheriff, and failed 1996 candidate for president, as their candidate.

On July 5, 2012, it was announced that Riemers would not appear on the ballot because his running mate, Richard Ames, failed to file a page of his paperwork. On September 12, 2012, after being disqualified from appearing on the ballot, Riemers, a Libertarian now running as an independent with Anthony Johns, said in a news release that he had submitted more than 1,100 signatures to the secretary of state. The pair appeared on the ballot certified by the secretary on Monday. Riemers filed a lawsuit to have the other candidates removed from the ballot.

== Democratic-NPL Party ==
=== Candidates ===
The North Dakota Democratic-NPL Party selected rancher and North Dakota Senate Minority Leader Ryan Taylor as their nominee. Ellen Chaffee was his running mate.

== General election ==
=== Debates ===
- Complete video of debate, October 5, 2012 - C-SPAN

=== Predictions ===
Source	Ranking	As of
The Cook Political Report	Solid R	November 1, 2012
Sabato's Crystal Ball	Safe R	November 5, 2012
Rothenberg Political Report	Safe R	November 2, 2012
Real Clear Politics	Safe R	November 5, 2012

=== Polling ===
Poll source	Date(s) administered	Sample size	Margin of error	Jack Dalrymple (R)	Ryan Taylor (D)	Other	Undecided
Pharos Research	October 26–28, 2012	752	± 3.6%	63%	34%	—	3%
Pharos Research	October 19–21, 2012	807	± 3.44%	63%	32%	—	5%
Rasmussen Reports	October 17–18, 2012	600	± 4.0%	53%	39%	2%	6%
Forum/Essman	October 12–15, 2012	500	± 4.4%	59%	28%	—	13%
Mason-Dixon	October 3–5, 2012	625	± 4.0%	62%	24%	1%	13%
Rasmussen Reports	July 10–11, 2012	400	± 5.0%	61%	26%	1%	11%

=== Results ===
North Dakota gubernatorial election, 2012
Party	Candidate	Votes	%	±%
Republican	Jack Dalrymple (incumbent); Drew Wrigley (incumbent)	200,525	63.10	▼11.34
Democratic–NPL	Ryan Taylor; Ellen Chaffee	109,048	34.31	▲10.78
Independent	Paul Sorum; Michael Coachman	5,356	1.69	N/A
Independent	Roland Riemers; Anthony Johns	2,618	0.82	N/A
Write-in		267	0.08	N/A
Majority		91,477	28.78	▼22.13
Total votes		317,814	100.00	
Republican hold				

==== Counties that flipped from Republican to Democratic ====
- Benson (largest CDP: Fort Totten)
- McHenry (largest city: Velva)
- Pierce (largest city: Rugby)
- Ransom (largest city: Lisbon)
- Sioux (largest CDP: Cannon Ball)
