= Erin Oban =

American politician

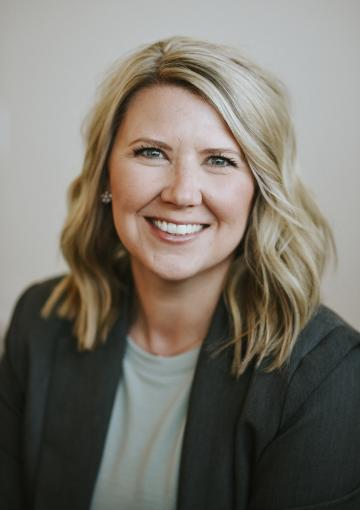
- Oban in 2022

North Dakota Director for USDA Rural Development
- In office March 28, 2022 – January 20, 2025
- President: Joe Biden
- Succeeded by: Tom Campbell

Member of the North Dakota Senate from the 35th district
- In office December 1, 2014 – March 27, 2022
- Preceded by: Margaret Sitte
- Succeeded by: Tracy Potter

Personal details
- Born: Ray, North Dakota, U.S.
- Party: Democratic-NPL
- Spouse: Chad Oban
- Education: University of Mary (BS)
- Profession: Middle School Teacher

Erin Oban is an American politician from the state of North Dakota. She is a former member of the North Dakota Senate for the 35th district and the North Dakota Democratic-Nonpartisan League Party.

== Early life ==
Oban earned a Bachelor of Science in mathematics education from the University of Mary. She previously taught math at a junior high school.

== Political career ==
Earlier in her career, Oban worked for U.S. Representative Earl Pomeroy, 2012 gubernatorial candidate Ryan Taylor, and Tobacco Free North Dakota.

Oban defeated incumbent Republican State Senator Margaret Sitte in the 2014 elections by 58% to 41%, becoming the first Democrat to represent Bismarck since 2010. She was inspired to run by Sitte's support of a Human Life Amendment to the North Dakota Constitution. Oban was re-elected in 2018.

In November 2021, Oban announced she would not run for re-election, citing a toxic environment in state politics. On March 17, 2022, the White House announced her appointment as USDA Rural Development state director for North Dakota. She will resign her role as state senator on March 27 and start the new role March 28. Former Senator Tracy Potter, who had announced his candidacy for the 35th district after Oban's retirement announcement, was appointed to the vacancy.

=== Electoral record ===
2014 general election: North Dakota State Senate, District 35
Party	Candidate	Votes	%
Democratic–NPL	Erin Oban	3,658	56.8%
Republican	Margaret Sitte	2,781	43.2%

2018 general election: North Dakota State Senate, District 35
Party	Candidate	Votes	%
Democratic–NPL	Erin Oban	3,992	54.3%
Republican	Gary Emineth	3,343	45.5%
	Other/Write-in	16	0.2%
