= 2012 United States presidential election in North Dakota =

- November 6, 2012
- Turnout: 61.11% ▼3.78 pp

Nominee	Mitt Romney	Barack Obama
Party	Republican	Democratic–NPL
Home state	Massachusetts	Illinois
Running mate	Paul Ryan	Joe Biden
Electoral vote	3	0
Popular vote	188,163	124,827
Percentage	58.32%	38.69%
County results
Romney
40–50%
50–60%
60–70%
70–80%
80–90%
Obama
40–50%
50–60%
70–80%
President before election
Barack Obama
Democratic-NPL
Elected President
Barack Obama
Democratic-NPL

The 2012 United States presidential election in North Dakota took place on November 6, 2012, as part of the 2012 United States presidential election in which all 50 states plus the District of Columbia participated. North Dakota voters chose three electors to represent them in the Electoral College via a popular vote pitting incumbent Democratic President Barack Obama and his running mate, Vice President Joe Biden, against Republican challenger and former Massachusetts Governor Mitt Romney and his running mate, Congressman Paul Ryan.

Mitt Romney handily won the state with 58.32% of the vote to Barack Obama's 38.69%, a 19.63% margin of victory, considerably higher than McCain's 8.65% margin of victory. He flipped seven counties that Obama carried in 2008, including Cass County, home to Fargo, the state's largest city. Obama was the first Democrat since Woodrow Wilson in 1912 to win without Mountrail County. As of the 2024 presidential election, this is the last time a Democrat won Benson, Ransom, Sargent, and Steele counties.

Despite Romney's comfortable margin of victory, Democratic candidate Heidi Heitkamp narrowly won the concurrent senate election.

== Caucuses ==
=== Republican caucuses ===
The 2012 North Dakota Republican caucuses were held on March 6, 2012. North Dakota has 28 delegates to the Republican National Convention; despite Rick Santorum's nominal win in the preference poll conducted during the caucuses, the majority of the delegates elected by the state party convention later in March said they supported Romney.

2012 North Dakota Republican presidential caucuses
Candidate	Votes	Percentage	Delegates
Rick Santorum	4,510	39.7%	6
Ron Paul	3,186	28.1%	2
Mitt Romney	2,691	23.7%	20
Newt Gingrich	962	8.5%	0
Unprojected delegates			0
Totals	11,349	100.0%	28

==== Convention controversy ====
The North Dakota Republican Party held its state convention from Friday, March 30 to Sunday, April 1, where twenty-five unbound National Convention delegates were elected. Rick Santorum had won the straw poll at the Legislative Districts caucuses on Super Tuesday with a large margin to Ron Paul in second place and Mitt Romney in third place. The party leadership's recommended slate of delegates was to reflect this straw poll result. However, the slate gave Romney a large majority of the delegates. Former NDGOP Chairman Gary Emineth called the vote undemocratic and a railroad job.

== General election ==
=== Polling ===
Poll source	Date(s) administered	Sample size	Margin of error	Barack Obama (D)	Mitt Romney (R)	Other	Undecided
Mason-Dixon	October 26–28	625	± 4.0%	40%	54%	3%	3%
Forum/Essman	October 12–15	500	± 4.3%	32%	57%	-	11%
Rasmussen Reports	October 17–18	600	± 4.0%	40%	54%	2%	4%
Mason-Dixon	October 3–5	625	± 4.0%	40%	54%	1%	5%
Rasmussen Reports	July 10–11, 2012	400	± - 5%	36%	51%	6%	7%
Mason-Dixon	June 4–12	625	± 4.0%	39%	52%	–	–

^{‡}Likely primary voters

=== Predictions ===
Source	Ranking	As of
Huffington Post	Safe R	November 6, 2012
CNN	Safe R	November 6, 2012
New York Times	Safe R	November 6, 2012
Washington Post	Safe R	November 6, 2012
RealClearPolitics	Solid R	November 6, 2012
Sabato's Crystal Ball	Solid R	November 5, 2012
FiveThirtyEight	Solid R	November 6, 2012

=== Results ===
2012 United States presidential election in North Dakota
Party	Candidate	Running mate	Votes	Percentage	Electoral votes
Republican	Mitt Romney	Paul Ryan	188,163	58.32%	3
Democratic-NPL	Barack Obama (incumbent)	Joe Biden (incumbent)	124,827	38.69%	0
Libertarian	Gary Johnson	Jim Gray	5,238	1.62%	0
Other			1,860	0.58%	0
Green	Jill Stein	Cheri Honkala	1,362	0.42%	0
Constitution	Virgil Goode	Jim Clymer	1,186	0.37%	0
Totals			322,932	100.00%	3

==== By county ====
County	Mitt Romney Republican		Barack Obama Democratic-NPL		Various candidates Other parties		Margin		Total
County	#	%	#	%	#	%	#	%	Total
Adams	918	71.38%	328	25.51%	40	3.11%	590	45.87%	1,286
Barnes	2,964	53.68%	2,394	43.35%	164	2.97%	570	10.33%	5,522
Benson	868	40.24%	1,235	57.26%	54	2.50%	-367	-17.02%	2,157
Billings	472	81.66%	89	15.40%	16	2.94%	383	66.26%	578
Bottineau	2,280	64.14%	1,183	33.28%	92	2.58%	1,097	30.86%	3,555
Bowman	1,280	73.69%	414	23.83%	43	2.48%	866	49.86%	1,737
Burke	769	75.17%	230	22.48%	24	2.35%	539	52.69%	1,023
Burleigh	27,951	64.42%	14,122	32.55%	1,314	3.03%	13,829	31.87%	43,387
Cass	36,855	49.90%	34,712	47.00%	2,288	3.10%	2,143	2.90%	73,855
Cavalier	1,195	57.76%	818	39.54%	56	2.70%	377	18.22%	2,069
Dickey	1,610	63.51%	853	33.65%	72	2.84%	757	29.86%	2,535
Divide	733	63.08%	385	33.13%	44	3.79%	348	29.95%	1,162
Dunn	1,506	74.04%	508	24.98%	20	0.98%	998	49.06%	2,034
Eddy	634	54.80%	486	42.01%	37	3.19%	148	12.79%	1,157
Emmons	1,435	76.17%	383	20.33%	66	3.50%	1,052	55.84%	1,884
Foster	1,030	61.24%	607	36.09%	45	2.67%	423	25.15%	1,682
Golden Valley	742	79.96%	162	17.46%	24	2.58%	580	62.50%	928
Grand Forks	15,060	50.15%	14,032	46.73%	937	3.12%	1,028	3.42%	30,029
Grant	1,025	72.54%	334	23.64%	54	3.82%	691	48.90%	1,413
Griggs	771	57.41%	536	39.91%	36	2.68%	235	17.50%	1,343
Hettinger	1,000	73.42%	313	22.98%	49	3.60%	687	50.44%	1,362
Kidder	870	65.51%	393	29.59%	65	4.90%	477	35.92%	1,328
LaMoure	1,377	62.76%	740	33.73%	77	3.51%	637	29.03%	2,194
Logan	810	75.49%	232	21.62%	31	2.89%	578	53.87%	1,073
McHenry	1,678	61.87%	943	34.77%	91	3.36%	735	27.10%	2,712
McIntosh	1,035	67.65%	459	30.00%	36	2.35%	576	37.65%	1,530
McKenzie	2,458	71.23%	927	26.86%	66	1.91%	1,531	44.37%	3,451
McLean	3,141	63.61%	1,670	33.82%	127	2.57%	1,471	29.79%	4,938
Mercer	3,152	70.75%	1,166	26.17%	137	3.08%	1,986	44.58%	4,455
Morton	8,680	63.76%	4,469	32.83%	464	3.41%	4,211	30.93%	13,613
Mountrail	1,962	56.75%	1,403	40.58%	92	2.67%	559	16.17%	3,457
Nelson	865	51.55%	767	45.71%	46	2.74%	98	5.84%	1,678
Oliver	693	68.41%	281	27.74%	39	3.85%	412	40.67%	1,013
Pembina	1,899	58.34%	1,253	38.49%	103	3.17%	646	19.85%	3,255
Pierce	1,465	67.26%	660	30.30%	53	2.44%	805	36.96%	2,178
Ramsey	2,665	53.31%	2,164	43.29%	170	3.40%	501	10.02%	4,999
Ransom	1,009	41.61%	1,343	55.38%	73	3.01%	-334	-13.77%	2,425
Renville	851	66.59%	398	31.14%	29	2.27%	453	35.45%	1,278
Richland	4,229	55.55%	3,198	42.01%	186	2.44%	1,031	13.54%	7,613
Rolette	1,092	23.99%	3,353	73.66%	107	2.35%	-2,261	-49.67%	4,552
Sargent	879	43.80%	1,075	53.56%	53	2.64%	-196	-9.76%	2,007
Sheridan	642	78.10%	163	19.83%	17	2.07%	479	58.27%	822
Sioux	225	19.67%	900	78.67%	19	1.66%	-675	-59.00%	1,144
Slope	341	78.03%	83	18.99%	13	2.98%	258	59.04%	437
Stark	8,521	73.25%	2,812	24.17%	300	2.58%	5,709	49.08%	11,633
Steele	498	47.79%	518	49.71%	26	2.50%	-20	-1.92%	1,042
Stutsman	5,685	59.48%	3,585	37.51%	288	3.01%	2,100	21.97%	9,558
Towner	623	52.71%	516	43.65%	43	3.64%	107	9.06%	1,182
Traill	1,996	50.91%	1,811	46.19%	114	2.90%	185	4.72%	3,921
Walsh	2,656	55.44%	1,985	41.43%	150	3.13%	671	14.01%	4,791
Ward	16,230	63.74%	8,441	33.15%	792	3.11%	7,789	30.59%	25,463
Wells	1,654	69.53%	673	28.29%	52	2.18%	981	41.24%	2,379
Williams	7,184	73.25%	2,322	23.67%	302	3.08%	4,862	49.58%	9,808
Totals	188,163	58.32%	124,827	38.69%	9,637	2.99%	63,336	19.63%	322,627

Counties that flipped from Democratic to Republican

- Cass (largest city: Fargo)
- Eddy (largest city: New Rockford)
- Grand Forks (largest city: Grand Forks)
- Mountrail (largest city: Stanley)
- Nelson (largest city: Lakota)
- Towner (largest city: Cando)
- Traill (largest city: Mayville)

==== By congressional district ====
Due to the state's low population, only one congressional district is allocated. This district is an at-large district, because it covers the entire state, and thus is equivalent to the statewide election results.

District	Romney	Obama	Representative
At-large	58.32%	38.7%	Kevin Cramer

== See also ==
- United States presidential elections in North Dakota
- 2012 Republican Party presidential debates and forums
- 2012 Republican Party presidential primaries
- Results of the 2012 Republican Party presidential primaries
- North Dakota Republican Party
