= 2012 North Dakota Republican presidential caucuses =

- March 6, 2012
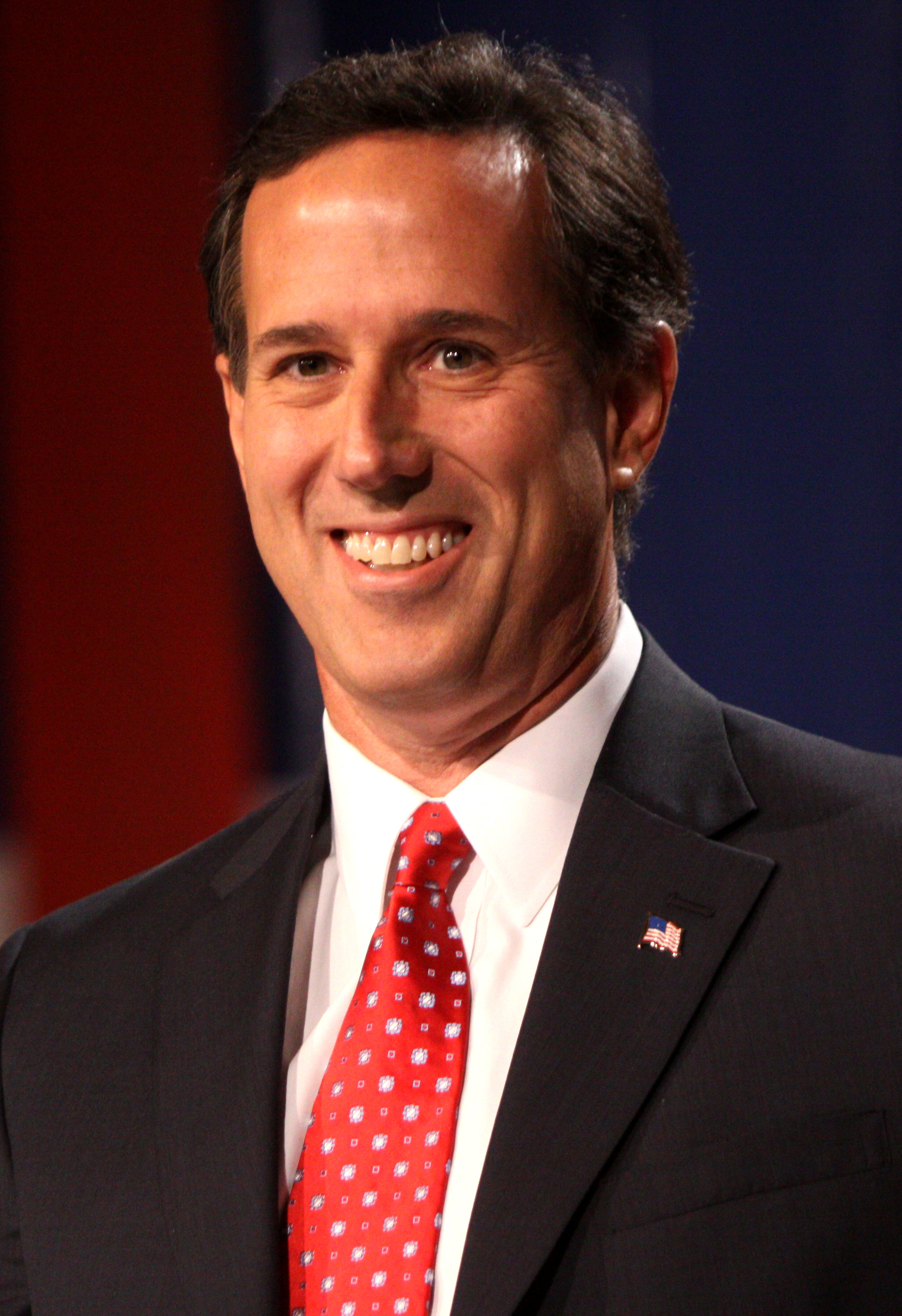

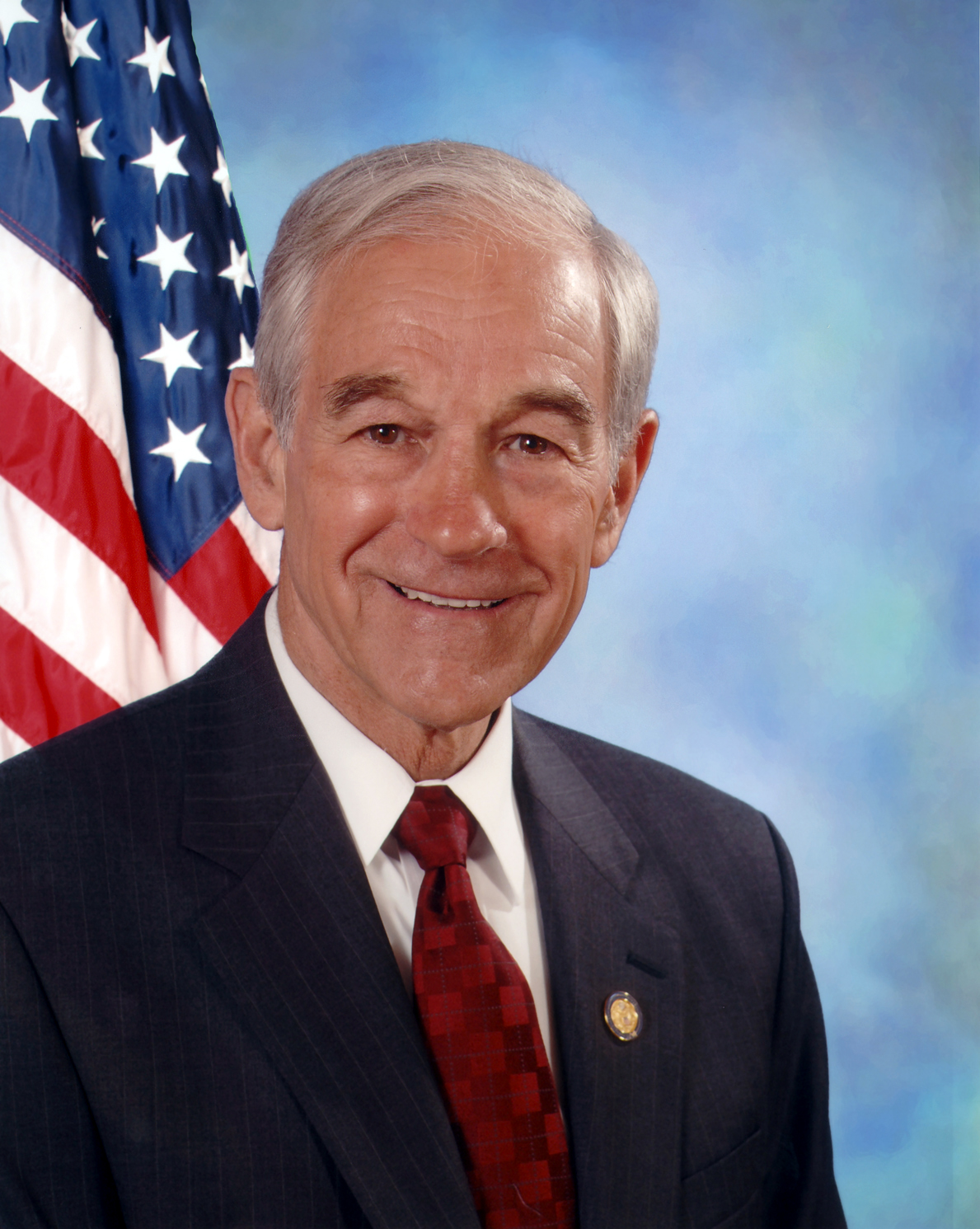

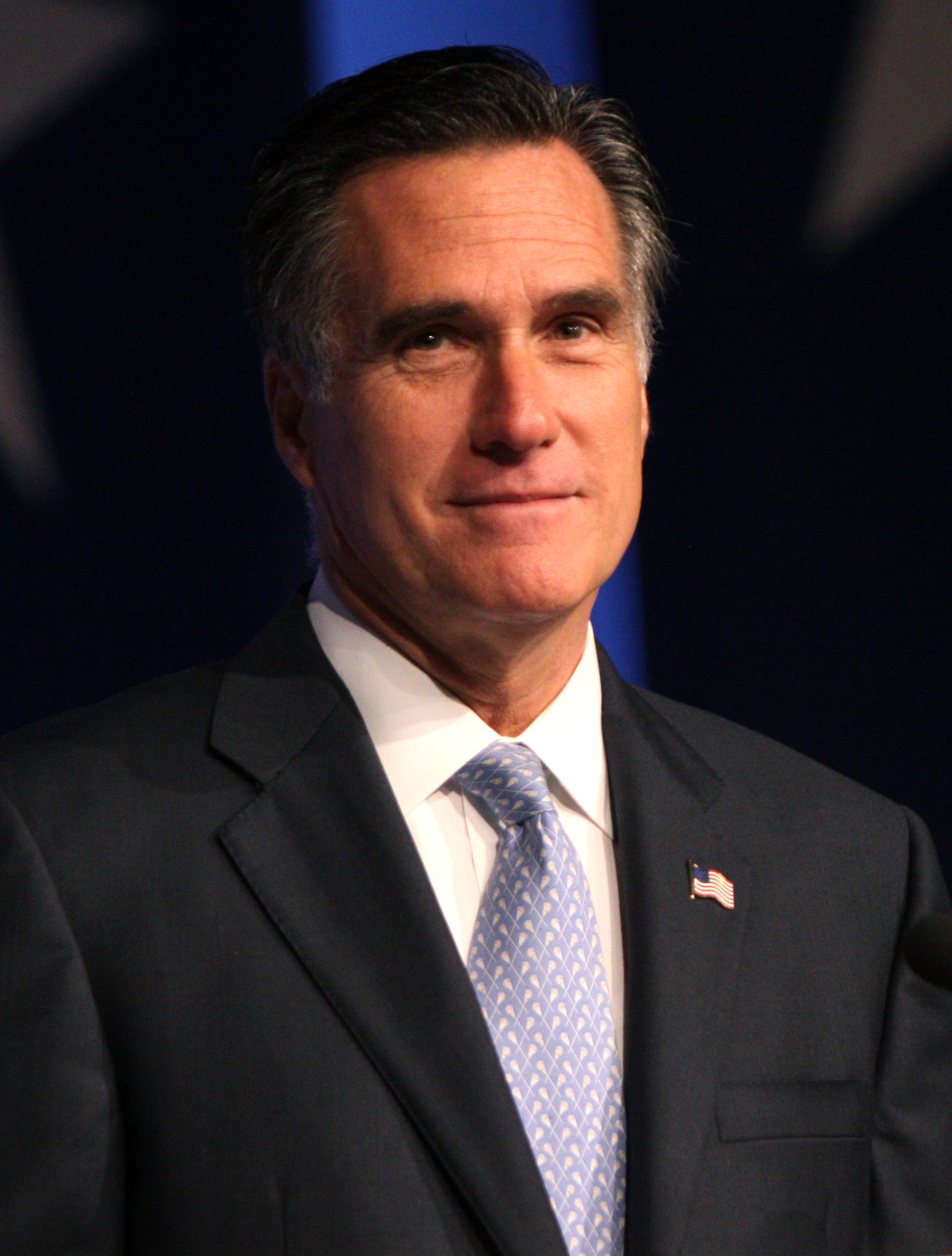

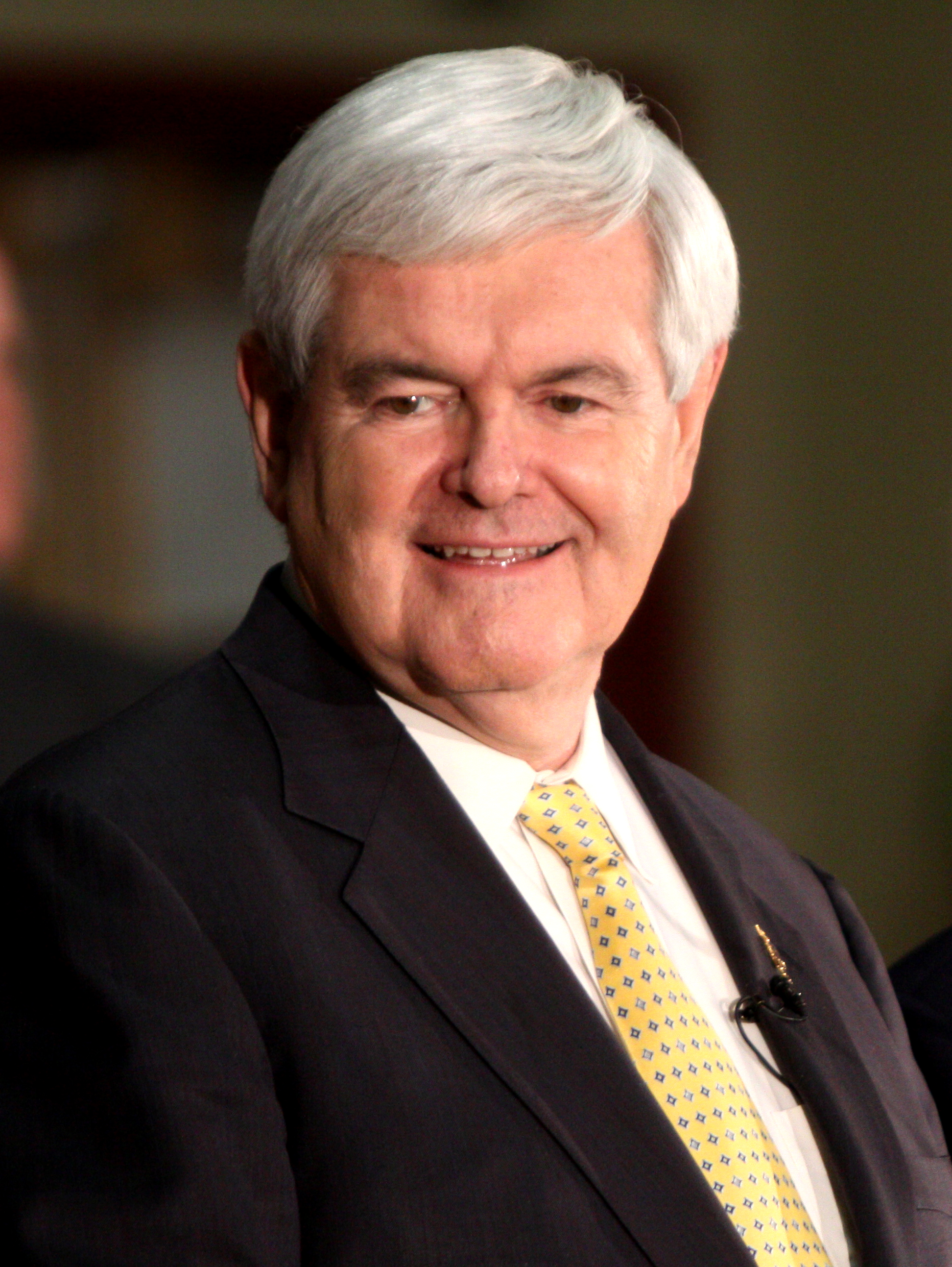
Candidate	Rick Santorum	Ron Paul
Party	Republican	Republican
Home state	Pennsylvania	Texas
Delegate count	6	2
Popular vote	4,510	3,186
Percentage	39.7%	28.1%
Candidate	Mitt Romney	Newt Gingrich
Party	Republican	Republican
Home state	Massachusetts	Georgia
Delegate count	20	0
Popular vote	2,691	962
Percentage	23.7%	8.5%

The 2012 North Dakota Republican presidential caucuses were held on March 6, 2012. North Dakota has 28 delegates to the Republican National Convention; despite Rick Santorum's nominal win in the preference poll conducted during the caucuses, the majority of the delegates elected by the state party convention later in March said they supported Romney.

== Results ==
2012 North Dakota Republican presidential caucuses
Candidate	Votes	Percentage	Delegates
Rick Santorum	4,510	39.7%	6
Ron Paul	3,186	28.1%	2
Mitt Romney	2,691	23.7%	20
Newt Gingrich	962	8.5%	--
Unprojected delegates			0
Totals	11,349	100.0%	28

== Convention controversy ==
North Dakota Republican Party had its state convention from Friday March 30 to Sunday April 1 where twenty-five unbound National Convention delegates were elected. Rick Santorum had won the strawpoll at the Legislative Districts caucuses on Super Tuesday with a large margin to Ron Paul in second place and Mitt Romney in third place. The state party's national delegate nominating committee recommended a slate of delegates based on participation in the party. There was no requirement that the delegates personally support any particular candidate. The slate was merely a means for the party's nominating committee to place names into nomination at the convention based on criteria that weighted previous participation in and financial support for the party. Additional names were nominated at the convention itself and the national delegates and alternates were elected by the state convention delegates. State Party rules only required that the national delegates chosen at the state convention caucus before or at the national convention and determine whether or how to reflect the previous strawpoll result. In August, 2012, the national delegation caucused in Tampa, Florida, at the Republican National Convention, and allowed each national delegate to vote their own conscience. According to Santorum and Paul supporters the slate placed into nomination by the party's nominating committee should have lived up to the strawpoll result, but instead gave Romney a large majority of the delegates. This misunderstanding of state party rules and procedures lead former NDGOP Chairman Gary Emineth to call the vote undemocratic and a railroad job.

== See also ==
- 2012 Republican Party presidential debates and forums
- 2012 Republican Party presidential primaries
- Results of the 2012 Republican Party presidential primaries
- North Dakota Republican Party
