= Uglem =

Uglem is a surname. Notable people with the surname include:

- Gerald Uglem (born 1947), American politician
- Kari Uglem (born 1970), Norwegian cross-country skier
- Mark Uglem (born 1951), American politician
