= Margaret Sitte =

American politician

Member of the North Dakota Senate from the 35th district
- In office December 1, 2010 – December 1, 2014
- Preceded by: Tracy Potter
- Succeeded by: Erin Oban

Member of the North Dakota House of Representatives from the 35th district
- In office December 1, 2002 – December 1, 2008 Serving with Bob Martinson
- Succeeded by: Karen Karls

Personal details
- Party: Republican

Margaret Sitte is an American politician and member of the Republican Party who served as a member of the North Dakota Senate for the 35th district.

== Career ==
Sitte served in the North Dakota House of Representatives from 2003 to 2007, coming second in the 2002 election for the two-member 35th district with 3,167 votes (26.62%), ahead of Democrat Audrey Cleary, who came third with 3,081 votes (25.90%).

Sitte ran for the North Dakota State Senate in 2006, but was narrowly beaten by Democrat Tracy Potter, who defeated her by 2,928 votes (50.46%) to 2,875 (49.54%). Potter ran for the U.S. Senate in 2010 and Sitte was elected to succeed him, defeating Democrat Nick Archuleta by 3,451 (59.47%) votes to 2,343 (40.38%).

Sitte received attention in 2013 for opposing Bill 2125, inspired by the death of Caylee Anthony, which would have required caretakers to report missing children within 48 hours. Sitte voted against it, saying: "I affectionately call this bill the 'Make Mary and Joseph Felons Bill' because Jesus was missing for three days."

Also in 2013, Sitte was the primary sponsor of the Human Life Amendment, Measure 1, a right to life measure that would have amended the North Dakota Constitution to say "The inalienable right to life of every human being at any stage of development must be recognized and protected." The measure was defeated in the 2014 elections. In that election, Sitte lost her re-election bid to Democrat Erin Oban by 58% to 41%.
