= Senator O'Connell =

Senator O'Connell may refer to:

- David O'Connell (politician) (born 1940), North Dakota State Senate
- Frank O'Connell (1923–2004), Pennsylvania State Senate
- Jack O'Connell (American politician) (born 1951), California State Senate
