= Karls =

Karls may refer to:

Surname

- Karen Karls, American politician
- Ken Karls (born 1947), Chairman of the North Dakota Republican Party 2003–2007
- Tommy Karls (born 1961), Swedish sprint and marathon canoeist

Other

- Karls robber frog (Eleutherodactylus karlschmidti), a possibly extinct Puerto Rican frog species
- Kong Karls Land, island group in the Svalbard archipelago, in the Arctic Ocean

== See also ==
- KARL
- Karl (disambiguation)
- Karlsen (disambiguation)
- Karlson (disambiguation)
