= Joe Satrom =

American politician

Member of the North Dakota Senate from the 52nd district
- In office 1982–1992

Personal details
- Born: October 10, 1945 (age 80) Broadlawn, North Dakota, U.S.
- Party: Democratic
- Education: North Dakota State University (BS)

Joe Satrom (born 10 October 1945) is an American businessman and environmental lobbyist from the U.S. state of North Dakota. He won the 2004 Democratic-NPL nomination for governor, but was defeated by the Republican incumbent, John Hoeven.

Satrom was born on his family's farm in Broadlawn Township in Steele County, North Dakota. He attended North Dakota State University and was editor-in-chief of the campus newspaper, The Spectrum, for two years.

In 1968 Satrom graduated from NDSU with a B.S. in agricultural education. He sat as a delegate to the state Democratic convention that year. Late that year he inquired with Governor Guy about possible positions for him in the administration, and was offered a job as travel director.

In summer of 1969 he married Katherine Platt in Fargo. In 1971 they opened Viking Travel, a travel agency in Bismarck. They sold it a couple of years later. In 1978 Joe and Katherine opened Satrom Travel and Tour as a completely independent travel company, and expanded to eight locations in North Dakota and Montana; all but two were eventually sold.

In 1980 Satrom lost a race to be a representative from District 47, however in 1982 he ran for senate in District 52 and won. He served until 1992.

He is a shareholder and sits on the board of Borgen Systems, a refrigerated display case firm based in Des Moines, Iowa.

Satrom is a member of Ducks Unlimited and the Nature Conservancy.

Party political offices
Preceded by Heidi Heitkamp	Democratic nominee for Governor of North Dakota; 2004	Succeeded by Tim Mathern
