= Merle Boucher =

American politician (1946–2026)

Minority Leader of the North Dakota House of Representatives
- In office 1996–2011
- Succeeded by: Jerry Kelsh

Member of the North Dakota House of Representatives from the 9th district
- In office 1991–2011
- Succeeded by: Marvin E. Nelson

Personal details
- Born: July 19, 1946 Rolette, North Dakota, U.S.
- Died: June 11, 2026 (aged 79) Bismarck, North Dakota, U.S.
- Party: North Dakota Democratic-NPL Party
- Spouse: Susan
- Education: North Dakota State University, Mayville State University
- Profession: Educator, farmer

Merle Boucher (July 19, 1946 – June 11, 2026) was an American North Dakota Democratic-NPL Party politician who served in the North Dakota House of Representatives, representing the 9th district from 1991 to 2011. He served as Minority Leader from 1996 to 2011.

Boucher sought and lost the Democratic-NPL nomination for governor in 2004 and in 2008, but became the running mate of 2008 nominee Tim Mathern, running on the ticket as the nominee for lieutenant governor. Two years after that ticket lost, Boucher became the Democratic-NPL nominee for North Dakota Agriculture Commissioner, losing in the 2010 election to incumbent Doug Goehring.

== Life and career ==
Boucher was from Rolette County, North Dakota and attended high school there. He went on to college, taking classes from the State School of Forestry. He then transferred to Mayville State University, where he graduated with a teaching degree in 1970.

He returned to Rolette and taught at the high school for 20 years. After retiring, he became a rancher. He held his family's original Homestead Act claim among other land. He coached the Rolette American Legion baseball team.

Boucher died in Bismarck, North Dakota on June 11, 2026, at the age of 79.

Party political offices
Preceded by Deb Mathern	Democratic nominee for Lieutenant Governor of North Dakota; 2008	Succeeded by Ellen Chaffee
Preceded by Roger Johnson	Democratic nominee for North Dakota Agriculture Commissioner; 2010	Succeeded by Ryan Taylor
