= 2016 United States Senate election in North Dakota =

- November 8, 2016
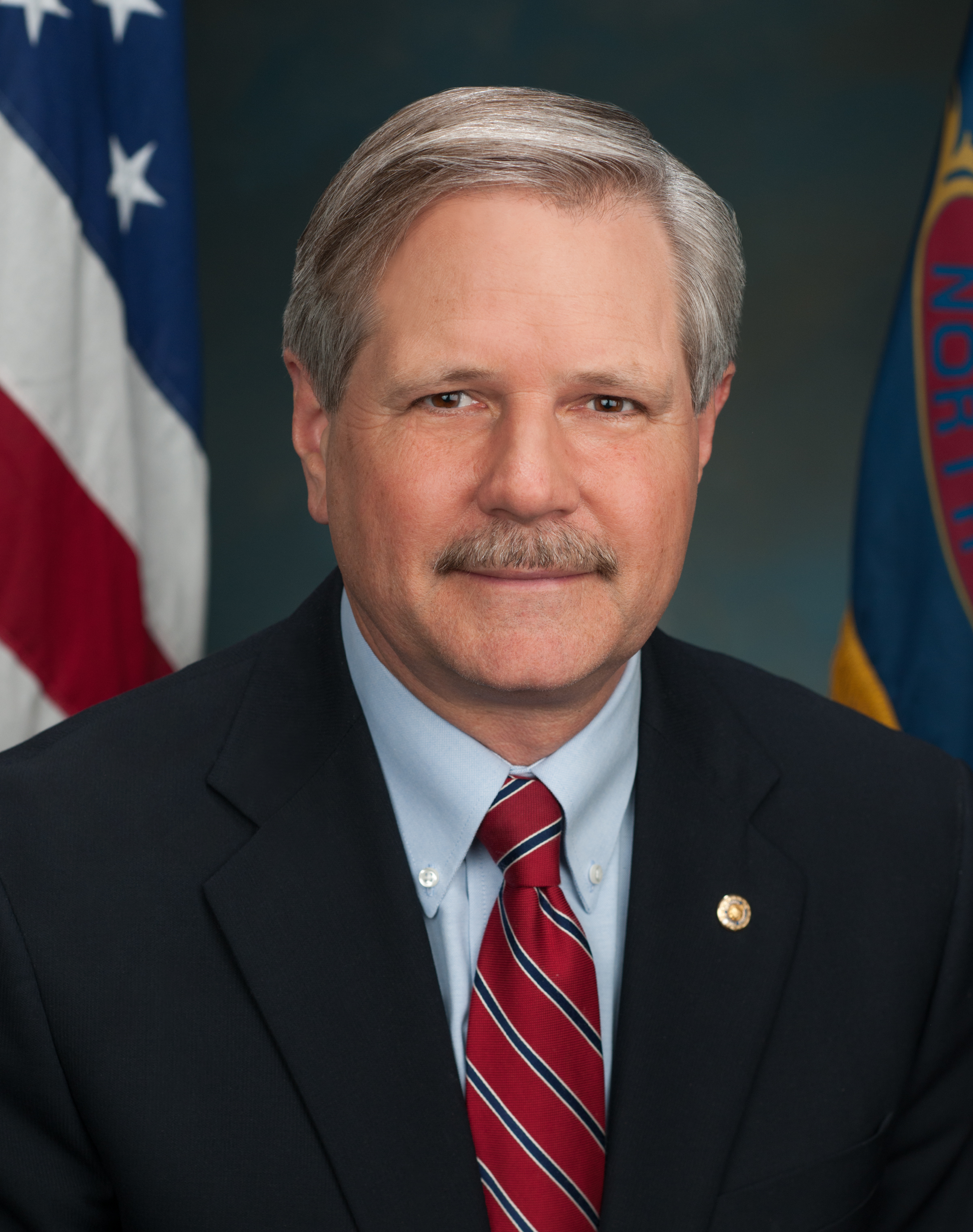

Nominee	John Hoeven	Eliot Glassheim
Party	Republican	Democratic–NPL
Popular vote	268,788	58,116
Percentage	78.48%	16.97%
- Hoeven: 40–50% 50–60% 60–70% 70–80% 80–90% >90% Glassheim: 50–60% 60–70%
U.S. senator before election
John Hoeven
Republican
Elected U.S. Senator
John Hoeven
Republican

The 2016 United States Senate election in North Dakota was held November 8, 2016, to elect a member of the United States Senate to represent the State of North Dakota, concurrently with the 2016 U.S. presidential election, as well as other elections to the United States Senate in other states and elections to the United States House of Representatives and various state and local elections. The primaries were held June 14.

Incumbent Republican Senator John Hoeven won re-election to a second term with 78.5% of the vote, the largest margin in the state's history. Hoeven became the first Republican senator to be re-elected from North Dakota since 1974.

== Republican primary ==
=== Candidates ===
- John Hoeven, incumbent U.S. Senator

=== Results ===
Republican primary results
Party	Candidate	Votes	%
Republican	John Hoeven (incumbent)	103,677	99.57%
Republican	Write-in	445	0.43%
Total votes		104,122	100.00%

== Democratic-NPL primary ==
=== Candidates ===
- Eliot Glassheim, state representative

=== Results ===
Democratic-NPL primary results
Party	Candidate	Votes	%
Democratic–NPL	Eliot Glassheim	17,243	99.72%
Democratic–NPL	Write-in	48	0.28%
Total votes		17,291	100.00%

== Libertarian Party ==
=== Candidates ===
- Robert Marquette

Libertarian primary results
Party	Candidate	Votes	%
Libertarian	Robert Marquette	1,089	99.54%
Libertarian	Write-in	5	0.46%
Total votes		1,094	100.00%

== General election ==
=== Debates ===
Dates	Location	Hoeven	Glassheim	Marquette	Link
October 13, 2016	Bismarck, North Dakota	Participant	Participant	Participant	

=== Predictions ===
Source	Ranking	As of
The Cook Political Report	Safe R	November 2, 2016
Sabato's Crystal Ball	Safe R	November 7, 2016
Rothenberg Political Report	Safe R	November 3, 2016
Daily Kos	Safe R	November 8, 2016
Real Clear Politics	Safe R	November 7, 2016

=== Polling ===
Poll source	Date(s) administered	Sample size	Margin of error	John Hoeven (R)	Eliot Glassheim (D)	Undecided
SurveyMonkey	November 1–7, 2016	313	± 4.6%	74%	23%	3%
SurveyMonkey	October 31–November 6, 2016	288	± 4.6%	73%	24%	3%
SurveyMonkey	October 28–November 3, 2016	276	± 4.6%	74%	24%	2%
SurveyMonkey	October 27–November 2, 2016	260	± 4.6%	72%	24%	4%
SurveyMonkey	October 26–November 1, 2016	254	± 4.6%	72%	25%	3%
SurveyMonkey	October 25–31, 2016	279	± 4.6%	71%	27%	2%

=== Results ===

United States Senate election in North Dakota, 2016
Party	Candidate	Votes	%	±%
Republican	John Hoeven (incumbent)	268,788	78.48%	+2.40%
Democratic–NPL	Eliot Glassheim	58,116	16.97%	−5.20%
Libertarian	Robert Marquette	10,556	3.08%	+1.45%
Independent	James Germalic	4,675	1.36%	N/A
Write-in		366	0.11%	N/A
Total votes		342,501	100.00%	N/A
Republican hold				

==== By county ====
County	John Hoeven Republican		Eliot Glassheim Democratic–NPL		All others		Margin		Total votes
County	#	%	#	%	#	%	#	%	Total votes
Adams	1,067	87.2%	114	9.3%	42	3.5%	953	77.9%	1,223
Barnes	4,302	80.6%	835	15.6%	201	3.7%	3,467	65.0%	5,338
Benson	1,340	66.3%	574	28.4%	3108	5.4%	766	37.9%	2,022
Billings	543	89.8%	43	7.1%	19	3.1%	500	82.7%	605
Bottineau	2,998	85.7%	383	10.9%	118	3.4%	2,615	74.8%	3,499
Bowman	1,605	89.5%	136	7.6%	53	2.9%	1,469	81.9%	1,794
Burke	970	91.9%	66	6.3%	19	1.8%	904	85.6%	1,055
Burleigh	38,830	81.2%	6,904	14.4%	2,097	4.4%	31,926	66.8%	47,831
Cass	57,151	71.6%	18,268	22.9%	4,403	5.6%	38,883	48.7%	79,822
Cavalier	1,707	83.3%	290	14.2%	51	2.5%	1,417	69.1%	2,048
Dickey	2,022	83.2%	335	13.8%	74	3.1%	1,687	72.4%	2,431
Divide	1,039	84.5%	140	11.4%	51	4.1%	899	73.1%	1,230
Dunn	1,909	85.5%	251	11.2%	73	3.3%	1,658	74.3%	2,233
Eddy	962	78.5%	219	17.9%	45	3.7%	743	60.6%	1,226
Emmons	1,774	89.7%	136	6.9%	68	3.5%	1,638	82.8%	1,978
Foster	1,491	85.5%	170	9.8%	82	4.7%	1,321	75.7%	1,743
Golden Valley	857	89.6%	62	6.5%	37	3.8%	795	83.1%	956
Grand Forks	20,860	69.9%	7,714	25.9%	1,266	4.3%	13,146	44.0%	29,840
Grant	1,251	89.0%	108	7.7%	47	3.4%	1,143	81.3%	1,406
Griggs	1,046	81.7%	194	15.1%	41	3.2%	852	66.3%	1,281
Hettinger	1,160	89.5%	88	6.8%	48	3.7%	1,072	82.7%	1,296
Kidder	1,224	87.6%	117	8.4%	57	4.1%	1,107	69.2%	1,398
LaMoure	1,818	83.3%	292	13.4%	72	3.2%	1,526	69.9%	2,182
Logan	989	90.6%	72	6.6%	31	2.8%	917	84.0%	1,092
McHenry	2,433	85.2%	296	10.4%	127	4.4%	2,137	74.8%	2,856
McIntosh	1,327	90.1%	110	7.5%	36	2.5%	1,217	82.6%	1,473
McKenzie	3,903	84.8%	494	10.7%	208	4.4%	3,409	74.1%	4,605
McLean	4,391	82.3%	2,104	13.4%	689	4.0%	3,659	68.9%	5,336
Mercer	4,041	86.4%	470	10.0%	166	3.5%	3,571	76.4%	4,677
Morton	12,963	82.3%	2,104	13.4%	689	5.3%	10,859	68.9%	15,756
Mountrail	1,980	73.0%	892	21.8%	211	5.1%	2,088	51.2%	4,083
Nelson	1,343	76.7%	323	18.5%	84	4.8%	1,020	58.2%	1,750
Oliver	915	89.3%	74	7.2%	36	3.5%	841	82.1%	1,025
Pembina	2,644	83.0%	453	14.2%	87	2.7%	2,191	68.8%	3,184
Pierce	1,816	86.7%	225	10.7%	55	2.4%	1,591	76.0%	2,094
Ramsey	4,291	79.9%	869	16.2%	208	3.9%	3,422	63.7%	5,368
Ransom	1,793	75.7%	463	19.6%	112	4.7%	3,422	56.1%	5,368
Renville	1,140	88.2%	104	8.0%	49	3.9%	1,036	80.2%	1,293
Richland	6,074	80.3%	1,117	14.8%	371	4.9%	4,957	65.5%	7,562
Rolette	1,801	48.3%	1,701	45.7%	224	6.0%	100	2.6%	3,726
Sargent	1,513	74.8%	423	20.9%	88	4.3%	1,090	53.9%	2,024
Sheridan	703	88.8%	60	7.6%	29	3.6%	634	81.2%	792
Sioux	426	35.7%	633	53.1%	133	11.2%	-207	-17.4%	1,192
Slope	388	90.7%	25	5.8%	15	3.4%	363	84.9%	428
Stark	10,635	87.2%	1,101	9.0%	464	3.8%	9,534	78.2%	12,200
Steele	791	76.6%	204	19.8%	37	3.6%	587	56.8%	1,032
Stutsman	8,392	83.2%	1,329	13.2%	366	3.7%	7,063	70.0%	10,087
Towner	952	80.9%	179	15.2%	46	3.9%	773	65.7%	1,177
Traill	3,062	77.4%	747	18.9%	148	3.8%	2,315	58.5%	3,958
Walsh	3,788	80.5%	749	15.9%	171	3.7%	3,039	64.6%	4,708
Ward	22,538	82.8%	3,309	12.2%	1,378	5.0%	19,229	70.6%	27,225
Wells	2,080	86.8%	239	10.0%	78	3.3%	1,841	76.8%	2,397
Williams	10,750	85.3%	1,180	9.4%	666	5.3%	9,570	75.9%	12,596
Totals	268,788	78.5%	58,116	17.0%	15,597	4.6%	210,672	61.5%	342,501

Counties that flipped from Republican to Democratic

- Sioux (Largest CDP: Cannon Ball)
