= David O'Connell (politician) =

American politician

Member of the North Dakota Senate from the 6th district
- In office 1989–2016
- Succeeded by: Shawn Vedaa

Minority Leader of the North Dakota State Senate
- In office 2003–2010
- Preceded by: Aaron Krauter
- Succeeded by: Ryan M. Taylor

Member of the North Dakota House of Representatives from the 6th district
- In office 1983–1989

Personal details
- Born: June 3, 1940 (age 86) Elms Township, Bottineau County, North Dakota, U.S.
- Party: Democratic
- Education: Minot State University-Bottineau
- Profession: businessman, farmer

David Paul Maskinbak O'Connell (born June 3, 1940) is a North Dakota Democratic-NPL Party politician who represented the 6th district in the North Dakota Legislative Assembly from 1983 to 2016. He served as North Dakota Senate Minority Leader from 1989 to 2011, eventually stepping down from party leadership to spend more time with his wife, who was having health problems at the time. Before serving in the Senate, he was a member of the North Dakota House of Representatives from 1983 through 1988.

O'Connell serves on the board of directors for the North Central Electric Cooperative, and is a member of the Knights of Columbus. He lives in Lansford, North Dakota.
