= 2008 North Dakota gubernatorial election =

- November 4, 2008
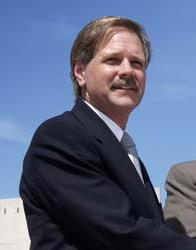

Nominee	John Hoeven	Tim Mathern
Party	Republican	Democratic–NPL
Running mate	Jack Dalrymple	Merle Boucher
Popular vote	235,009	74,279
Percentage	74.44%	23.53%
- County results Hoeven: 50–60% 60–70% 70–80% 80–90% Mathern: 50–60%
Governor before election
John Hoeven
Republican
Elected Governor
John Hoeven
Republican

The 2008 North Dakota gubernatorial election took place on November 4, 2008 for the post of Governor of North Dakota. Incumbent Republican governor John Hoeven was easily reelected again, defeating Democratic-NPL challenger Tim Mathern. The primaries took place on June 10, 2008. In this election, Hoeven outperformed John McCain, the Republican presidential nominee, by about 21%; McCain defeated Democratic nominee Barack Obama 53%–45% in the concurrent presidential election.

In 2022, voters voted in favor of Constitutional Measure 1 to term-limit governors. Doug Burgum, who was in his second term when the measure passed, would have been eligible to run for a third under grandfather clause, but he ultimately chose not to, making 2008 the last time an incumbent ran for a third consecutive term.

== Candidates ==
=== Republican ===
- John Hoeven, Governor of North Dakota

- Running mate: Jack Dalrymple, Lieutenant Governor of North Dakota

=== Democratic-NPL ===
- Tim Mathern, State Senator

- Running mate: Merle Boucher, State Representative

=== Independent ===
- DuWayne Hendrickson

- Running mate: Dana Brandenberg

== General election ==
=== Predictions ===
Source	Ranking	As of
The Cook Political Report	Safe R	October 16, 2008
Rothenberg Political Report	Safe R	November 2, 2008
Sabato's Crystal Ball	Safe R	November 3, 2008
Real Clear Politics	Safe R	November 4, 2008

=== Polling ===
Source	Date	John Hoeven (R)	Tim Mathern (D)
Rasmussen Reports	September 8, 2008	68%	28%
Rasmussen Reports	July 8, 2008	67%	27%

=== Results ===
North Dakota gubernatorial election, 2008
Party	Candidate	Votes	%	±%
Republican	John Hoeven (Incumbent); Jack Dalrymple (Incumbent)	235,009	74.44	▲3.19
Democratic–NPL	Tim Mathern; Merle Boucher	74,279	23.53	▼3.86
Independent	DuWayne Hendrickson; Dana Brandenberg	6,404	2.03	N/A
Majority		160,730	50.91	▲7.05
Total votes		315,692	100.00	
Republican hold				

==== Counties that flipped from Democratic to Republican ====
- Sioux (Largest CDP: Cannon Ball)
