= Tracy Potter =

American politician

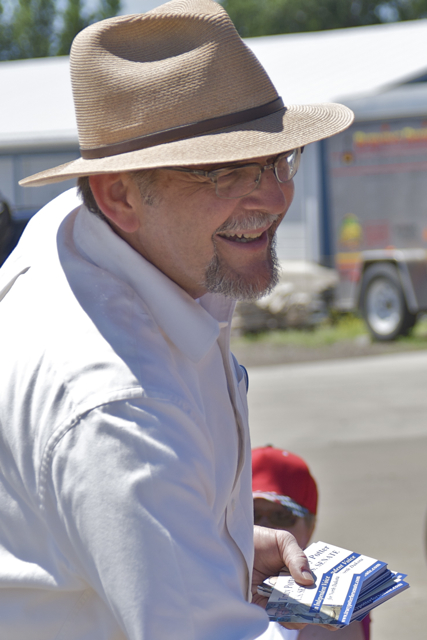

Member of the North Dakota Senate from the 35th district
- In office March 29, 2022 – December 1, 2022
- Preceded by: Erin Oban
- Succeeded by: Sean Cleary
- In office December 1, 2006 – December 1, 2010
- Preceded by: Ed Kringstad
- Succeeded by: Margaret Sitte

Personal details
- Born: June 23, 1950 (age 76) Bismarck, North Dakota, U.S.
- Party: Democratic
- Spouse: Laura Anhalt
- Education: University of North Dakota

Tracy Potter (born June 23, 1950) is an American historian, politician and former member of the North Dakota Democratic-NPL Party. He represented District 35 in the North Dakota Senate from 2006 to 2010 and in 2022. He was also the Democratic nominee for the U.S. Senate in 2010 and for Superintendent of Public Instruction in 2012. From 1993 to 2015, he served as executive director of The Fort Abraham Lincoln Foundation.

Potter earned BA and MA degrees in History from the University of North Dakota. From 1993 to 2015, he was executive director of the Fort Abraham Lincoln Foundation, and was President of the Northern Plains Heritage Foundation. Potter was awarded the GNDA Tourism Development Award in 1997, and Tourism Industry Leader Award in 2005. He is active in Rotary. Potter was mentioned as a potential candidate for insurance commissioner, but he lacked interest in the position, saying "When I first saw (the opening), it got the competitive juices flowing, and I thought I could win," he said. "But then I realized that if I did win, I would be insurance commissioner." Potter had previously worked for the insurance department from 1978 to 1980 and ran unsuccessfully for the position in 1984.

He was elected to the State Senate in 2006, narrowly defeating Republican State Representative Margaret Sitte. He did not run for re-election in 2010, instead running for the U.S. Senate, losing to Republican Governor John Hoeven.

Potter ran as an independent for the no-party North Dakota Superintendent of Public Instruction, to fill the vacancy left by Wayne Sanstead, who retired. He advanced to the general election finishing ahead of the Democratic-NPL endorsed candidate in the open primary, but lost to Republican Kirsten Baesler in the general election.

He ran for the North Dakota House of Representatives in 2014 but was defeated. He initially ran for his old Senate seat against Sitte, who had succeeded him in 2010, but he was defeated for the Democratic nomination by Erin Hill-Oban, then being nominated for the House instead. After Oban announced her retirement from the North Dakota Senate, Potter announced his intention to run for the seat in the 2022 election. When Oban resigned to accept the position of North Dakota State director for USDA Rural Development, the local Democratic Party appointed Potter to the vacant seat.

== See also ==
- 2010 United States Senate election in North Dakota
- Politics of North Dakota

Party political offices
| Preceded by Byron Dorgan | Democratic nominee for U.S. Senator from North Dakota (Class 3); 2010 | Succeeded by Eliot Glassheim |
