= John Hoeven =

American banker and politician (born 1957)

- Official portrait, 2013

United States Senator from North Dakota
- Incumbent
- Assumed office January 3, 2011 Serving with Kevin Cramer
- Preceded by: Byron Dorgan

Chair of the Senate Indian Affairs Committee
- In office January 3, 2017 – February 3, 2021
- Preceded by: John Barrasso
- Succeeded by: Brian Schatz

31st Governor of North Dakota
- In office December 15, 2000 – December 7, 2010
- Lieutenant: Jack Dalrymple
- Preceded by: Ed Schafer
- Succeeded by: Jack Dalrymple

12th President of the Bank of North Dakota
- In office 1993–2000
- Preceded by: Joseph Lamb
- Succeeded by: Eric Hardmeyer

Personal details
- Born: John Henry Hoeven III; March 13, 1957 (age 69) Bismarck, North Dakota, U.S.
- Party: Republican (1998–present)
- Other political affiliations: Independent (before 1996); Democratic (1996–1998)
- Spouse: Mikey Laird
- Children: 2
- Education: Dartmouth College (BA); Northwestern University (MBA)
- Website: Senate website Campaign website
- John Hoeven's voice John Hoeven speaks on food price inflation with Agriculture Secretary Tom Vilsack; Recorded May 10, 2022

John Henry Hoeven III (/ˈhoʊvən/ HOH-vən; born March 13, 1957) is an American politician and banker serving as the senior U.S. senator from North Dakota, a seat he has held since 2011. A member of the Republican Party, Hoeven served as the 31st governor of North Dakota from 2000 to 2010.

Before entering politics, Hoeven was a retail banker who served in numerous executive roles at various banks, most notably as president of the Bank of North Dakota, the only state-owned bank in the United States, from 1993 to 2000. He is on the board of directors at First Western Bank & Trust and has an estimated net worth of $45 million, making him one of the wealthiest U.S. senators. Hoeven has been the dean of North Dakota's congressional delegation since 2013, when Senator Kent Conrad retired.

Hoeven was first elected to public office in the 2000 North Dakota gubernatorial election, and was reelected in 2004 and 2008. He was elected to the U.S. Senate in 2010, and reelected in 2016 and 2022.

== Early life and education ==
Hoeven was born in Bismarck, North Dakota, the son of Patricia "Trish" (née Chapman) and John Henry "Jack" Hoeven, Jr. His father owned a bank in Minot, North Dakota, where he worked as the president and chairman. Hoeven's ancestry is Dutch, Swedish, and English.

Hoeven studied at Dartmouth College, which his father also attended. Hoeven belonged to the Alpha Chi Alpha fraternity and graduated with honors with a B.A. in 1979. While there, he played on the men's golf team.

After Dartmouth, Hoeven attended the Kellogg School of Management at Northwestern University, graduating with an MBA in 1981.

== Banking career ==
From 1986 to 1993, Hoeven was executive vice president of First Western Bank & Trust, an institution his father bought in 1970. At one time, he owned 39% of the bank’s parent company, Westbrand, Inc. From 1993 to 2000, he was the president and CEO of the Bank of North Dakota, under governor Ed Schafer.

== Governor of North Dakota (2000-2010) ==
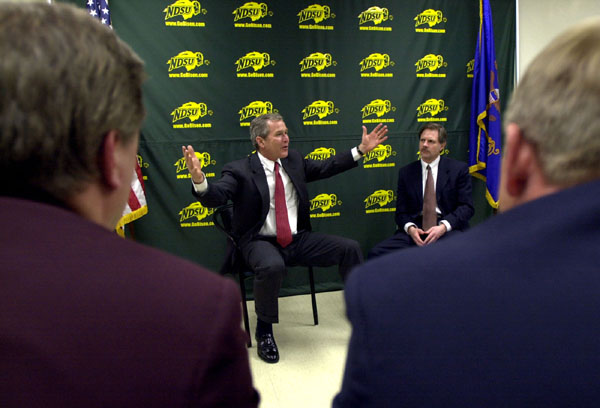
Hoeven and President George W. Bush meet with farmers from North Dakota in March 2001

=== Elections ===
==== 2000 ====
In 2000 Hoeven ran for governor of North Dakota as a Republican and won, defeating Democratic NPL nominee Heidi Heitkamp, 55% to 45%.

==== 2004 ====
Hoeven was reelected over Democratic-NPL nominee Joe Satrom with 71% of the vote.

==== 2008 ====
On November 13, 2007, Hoeven announced his candidacy for a third term and kicked off his campaign with stops in Fargo, Grand Forks, Bismarck and Minot. He was reelected with 74% of the vote over Democratic-NPL nominee Tim Mathern. It was the first time in North Dakota history that a governor won three four-year terms in office, though the record for serving is still maintained by Bill Guy, who served 12 years.

=== Tenure ===
Hoeven's governorship included the expansion and diversification of the state's economy, which led to a 49.5% increase in the state's real gross domestic product. Beginning in 2000, he directed the development of a multi-resource energy program for the state with incentives in each energy sector, making North Dakota one of the country's largest energy-producing and exporting states. The state gained nearly 40,000 new jobs during his tenure. Wages and personal incomes grew faster than the national average. For a few years, the state led the nation in export growth. In late 2006, the state's reserve rose past $600 million, and it is now over $700 million.

In December 2009, Hoeven was the country's most popular governor. His approval rating stood at 87% with only 10% disapproving. In January 2007, Hoeven became the nation's most senior governor, having been inaugurated on December 15, 2000, as established by the North Dakota Constitution.

== U.S. Senate (2011-present) ==
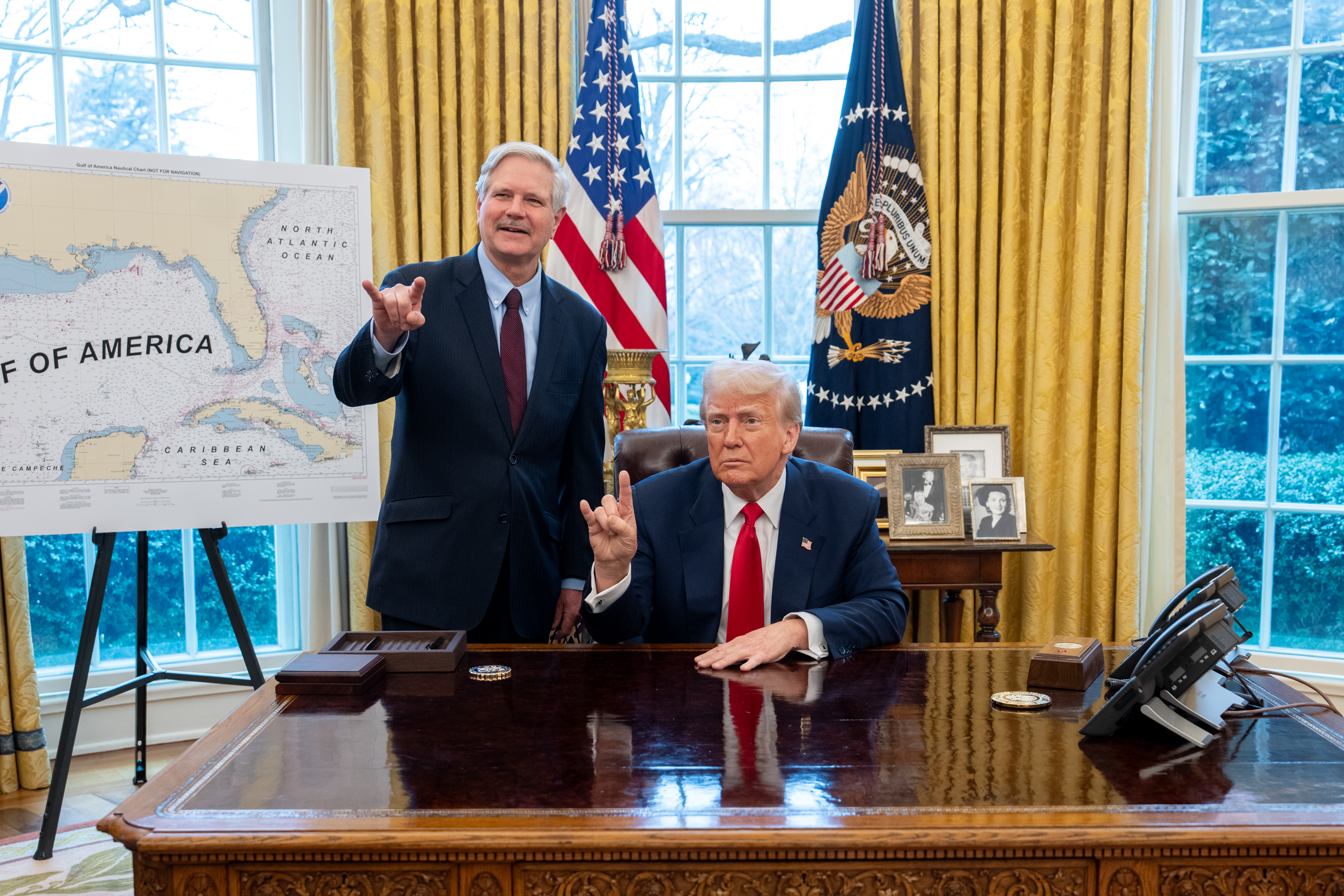
Hoeven and President Donald Trump in the Oval Office in March 2025

=== Elections ===
==== 2010 ====
On January 11, 2010, Hoeven announced he would run in the 2010 North Dakota Senate election for the seat being vacated by Byron Dorgan. Hoeven defeated Democratic-NPL nominee Tracy Potter, 76% to 22%, making him the first Republican to represent North Dakota in the Senate since 1987.

==== 2016 ====
Hoeven was reelected in 2016.

==== 2022 ====
Hoeven was reelected in 2022.

=== Tenure ===
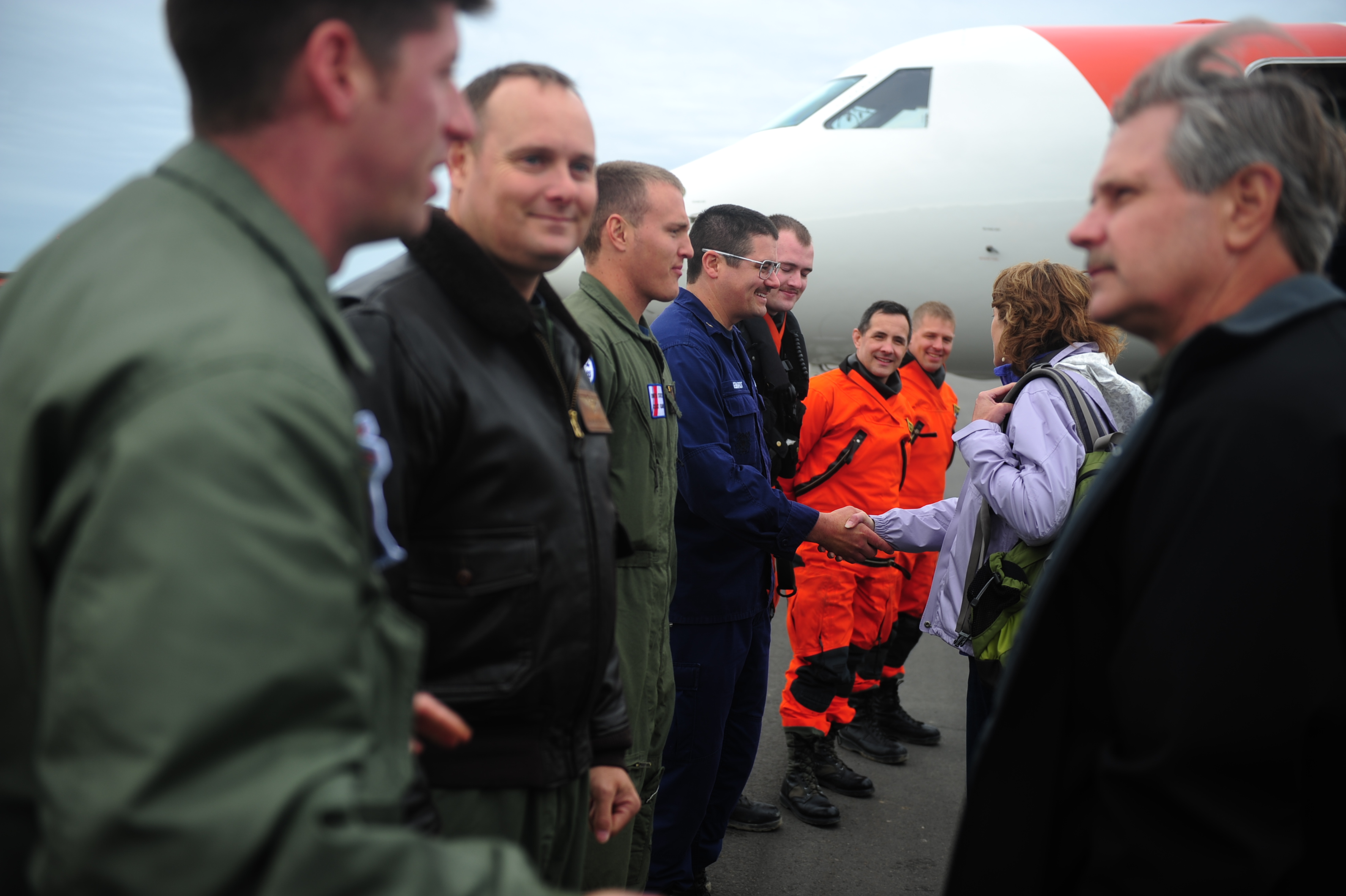
Hoeven with U.S. Coast Guard aircrews in Alaska, August 5, 2012

Since 2013, Hoeven has been the dean of North Dakota's congressional delegation. As of 2018, he was listed as one of the seven wealthiest U.S. senators.

For his tenure as the chair of the Senate Indian Affairs Committee in the 116th Congress, Hoeven earned an F grade from the nonpartisan Lugar Center's Congressional Oversight Hearing Index.

=== Committee assignments ===
- Committee on Agriculture, Nutrition, and Forestry
  - Subcommittee on Commodities, Markets, Trade and Risk Management
  - Subcommittee on Jobs, Rural Economic Growth and Energy Innovation
  - Subcommittee on Nutrition, Specialty Crops, Food and Agricultural Research (chair)
- Committee on Appropriations
  - Subcommittee on Agriculture, Rural Development, Food and Drug Administration, and Related Agencies
  - Subcommittee on Homeland Security (chair)
  - Subcommittee on Energy and Water Development
  - Subcommittee on Interior, Environment, and Related Agencies
  - Subcommittee on Military Construction, Veterans Affairs, and Related Agencies
- Committee on Energy and Natural Resources
  - Subcommittee on Energy
  - Subcommittee on National Parks
  - Subcommittee on Public Lands, Forests and Mining
- Committee on Indian Affairs (chair 2017–2021)

== Political positions ==
Hoeven was briefly a member of the Democratic-NPL Party before becoming active in the Republican Party as a district chair and volunteer. He has walked a conservative line on some issues and a moderate one on others, including increasing education funding, ethics reform, compensation for teachers, as well as increased funding on infrastructure. On August 10, 2021, Hoeven was one of 19 Senate Republicans to vote with the Democratic caucus in favor of the Infrastructure Investment and Jobs Act.

=== Crime ===
Hoeven supports decreasing access to parole for violent offenders. He believes that drug control policy should be a state issue, not a federal one.

=== Economy and employment ===
Hoeven opposed the Employee Free Choice Act, which included a card check provision.

=== Energy and environment ===
Hoeven believes that alternative fuels are a long-term solution but that increased oil drilling is required in the short term. He has been a vocal advocate for the Keystone Pipeline, falsely asserting that it has never leaked and claiming that environmental risks have been exaggerated. The Keystone Pipeline has in fact leaked twice, in 2010 and in 2016.

In 2015, Hoeven submitted an amendment asserting that climate change is real and that humans are contributing to it but also that the Keystone Pipeline would not contribute to climate change. His League of Conservation Voters score for 2018 was 7%.

=== Gun policy ===
Hoeven consistently votes for pro-gun legislation and has earned an "A+" grade from the NRA Political Victory Fund (NRA-PVF). The NRA-PVF has endorsed him repeatedly, including during his campaigns for governor in 2008 and senator in 2010.

In June 2016, Hoeven voted on four gun control proposals that were developed as a result of the Orlando nightclub shooting. He voted for Chuck Grassley's expansion of background checks and provision of funding to research the cause of mass shootings, and for John Cornyn's 72-hour wait period for purchases of guns by people on the terrorist watchlist. He voted against Chris Murphy's proposal to require background checks for every gun sale, including online sales and at gun shows, and against Dianne Feinstein's proposal to ban anyone on the terrorist watchlist from buying a gun. Hoeven voted against the latter bill due to its lack of "judicial oversight or due process".

=== Women's issues ===
Hoeven calls himself pro-life. He opposes abortion in all cases except rape, incest, or threat to the mother's life. He opposes government funding for elective abortions and supports the Hyde Amendment, which permits federal funding for abortion services only under the above exceptions. Hoeven voted to reauthorize the Violence Against Women Act in 2012.

=== Israel Anti-Boycott Act ===
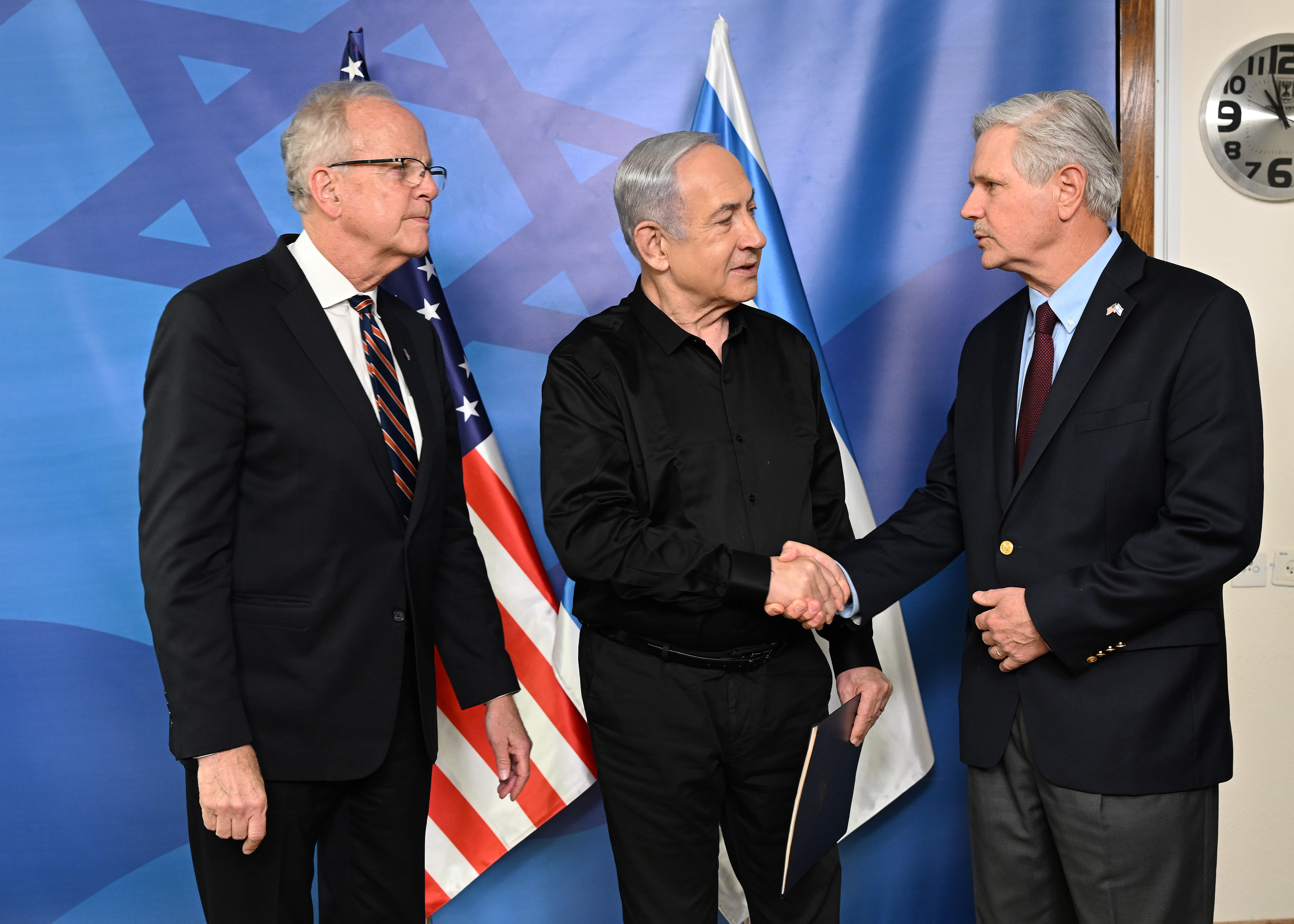
Hoeven with Israeli prime minister Benjamin Netanyahu in Israel, November 12, 2023

In April 2017, Hoeven co-sponsored the Israel Anti-Boycott Act (s. 720), a bill that would bar federal contractors from participating in boycotts against Israel or Israeli settlements.

=== Immigration ===
In 2013, Hoeven voted for the Border Security, Economic Opportunity, and Immigration Modernization Act of 2013, a bill that would have provided for comprehensive immigration reform and for other purposes.

=== LGBT rights ===
Hoeven opposes same-sex marriage. In 2013, he voted against legislation that would ban discrimination based on sexual orientation. In 2022, he voted against federal protections for same-sex married couples.

=== January 6th ===
On May 28, 2021, Hoeven voted against creating an independent commission to investigate the 2021 United States Capitol attack.

=== Taxes ===
Hoeven supported investment tax credits for farm investments until 2025, when he switched his stance in support of a GOP budget that limits farm aid.

== Electoral history ==
2000 North Dakota gubernatorial election
Party	Candidate	Votes	%	±%
Republican	John Hoeven	159,255	55.03%	−11.16%
Democratic–NPL	Heidi Heitkamp	130,144	44.97%	+11.16%
Write-ins		13	0.00%	
Majority		29,111	10.06%	−22.32%
Turnout		289,412		
Republican hold		Swing		

2004 North Dakota gubernatorial election
Party	Candidate	Votes	%	±%
Republican	John Hoeven (Incumbent)	220,803	71.26%	+16.23%
Democratic–NPL	Joe Satrom	84,877	27.39%	−17.58%
Libertarian	Roland Riemers	4,193	1.35%	
Majority		135,926	43.87%	+33.81%
Turnout		309,873		
Republican hold		Swing		

2008 North Dakota gubernatorial election
Party	Candidate	Votes	%	±%
Republican	John Hoeven (Incumbent)	235,009	74.44%	+3.19%
Democratic–NPL	Tim Mathern	74,279	23.53%	−3.86%
Independent	DuWayne Hendrickson	6,404	2.03%	
Majority		160,730	50.91%	+7.05%
Turnout		315,692		
Republican hold		Swing		

2010 United States Senate election in North Dakota
Party	Candidate	Votes	%	±%
Republican	John Hoeven	181,689	76.08%	+44.36%
Democratic–NPL	Tracy Potter	52,955	22.17%	−46.11%
Libertarian	Keith Hanson	3,890	1.63%	N/A
Majority		128,734	53.91%	
Turnout		238,534	100.00%	
Republican gain from Democratic–NPL		Swing		

2016 North Dakota Senate Republican primary results
Party	Candidate	Votes	%
Republican	John Hoeven (Incumbent)	103,677	99.57%
Republican	Write-in	445	0.43%
Total votes		104,122	100.00%

2016 United States Senate election in North Dakota
Party	Candidate	Votes	%	±%
Republican	John Hoeven (Incumbent)	268,788	78.48%	+2.40%
Democratic–NPL	Eliot Glassheim	58,116	16.97%	−5.20%
Libertarian	Robert Marquette	10,556	3.08%	+1.45%
Independent	James Germalic	4,675	1.36%	N/A
n/a	Write-ins	366	0.11%	N/A
Total votes		342,501	100.0%	N/A
Republican hold				

2022 North Dakota Senate Republican primary results
Party	Candidate	Votes	%
Republican	John Hoeven (Incumbent)	59,529	77.8%
Republican	Riley Kuntz	16,400	21.4%
Republican	Write-in	557	0.7%
Total votes		76,486	100.00%

2022 United States Senate election in North Dakota
Party	Candidate	Votes	%	±%
Republican	John Hoeven (Incumbent)	135,478	56.41%	−22.07%
Democratic–NPL	Katrina Christiansen	59,997	24.98%	+8.01%
Independent	Rick Becker	44,412	18.49%	N/A
Write-in		273	0.11%	N/A
Total votes		240,160	100.00%	N/A
Republican hold				

Civic offices
Preceded by Joseph Lamb	President of the Bank of North Dakota; 1993–2000	Succeeded by Eric Hardmeyer
Party political offices
Preceded by Ed Schafer	Republican nominee for Governor of North Dakota; 2000, 2004, 2008	Succeeded by Jack Dalrymple
Preceded by Mike Liffrig (2004)	Republican nominee for U.S. senator from North Dakota (Class 3); 2010, 2016, 2022	Most recent
Political offices
Preceded by Ed Schafer	Governor of North Dakota; 2000–2010	Succeeded by Jack Dalrymple
U.S. Senate
Preceded by Byron Dorgan	United States Senator (Class 3) from North Dakota; 2011–present Served alongside: Kent Conrad, Heidi Heitkamp, Kevin Cramer	Incumbent
Preceded by John Barrasso	Chair of the Senate Indian Affairs Committee; 2017–2021	Succeeded by Brian Schatz
U.S. order of precedence (ceremonial)
Preceded by Jerry Moran	Order of precedence of the United States as United States Senator	Succeeded by Mike Lee
Preceded by John Boozman	United States senators by seniority 28th	Succeeded by Ron Johnson
