= Audrey Cleary =

American politician (1930–2019)

Member of the North Dakota House of Representatives from the 49th district
- In office 1999–2002 Serving with Bob Martinson, Jon Martinson
- Preceded by: Connie Johnsen
- Succeeded by: redistricted

Personal details
- Born: Audrey Marie Boucher; June 1, 1930 Menominee, Michigan
- Died: February 5, 2019 (aged 88) Bismarck, North Dakota
- Party: Democratic–NPL
- Spouse: Joseph Cleary
- Education: Marquette University College of Nursing
- Occupation: Nurse

Audrey Marie Cleary (née Boucher; June 1, 1930 – February 5, 2019) was a Democratic-NPL politician who represented District 49 in the North Dakota House of Representatives from 1991 to 1997 and from 1999 to 2003.

== Biography ==
Audrey Marie Boucher was born in Menominee, Michigan in 1930. She graduated from the Marquette University College of Nursing in 1952 and worked as a labor and delivery nurse for several years. In 1954, she married Joseph Cleary with whom she moved to Bismarck, North Dakota the next year. The Clearys raised eleven children in Bismarck.

After all her children had moved out, Audrey Cleary, a longtime supporter of the Democratic–NPL Party, ran for her local seat in the North Dakota State House of Representatives. She won her election and served in the 1991–1992 legislative session alongside Republicans Bob and Jon Martinson. In 2004, after North Dakota legislative district lines were redrawn according to a Republican redistricting plan, she was defeated in the new District 35 by Republican opponent Margaret Sitte. Some commentators in the local media argued that Cleary was being gerrymandered out due to the new district having strong Republican-leaning areas introduced. However, Cleary insisted that it had not been done to specifically target her as the lone Democrat representing Bismarck due to her district already having Republican-leaning areas.

Audrey Boucher died in Bismarck on February 7, 2019, aged 88. North Dakota Democrats paid tribute to her.
