= Eliot Glassheim =

American politician (1938–2019)

Member of the North Dakota House of Representatives from the 18th district
- In office January 5, 1993 – January 2017
- Succeeded by: Steve Vetter

Personal details
- Born: February 10, 1938 New York City, U.S.
- Died: December 25, 2019 (aged 81) Grand Forks, North Dakota, U.S.
- Party: Democratic
- Spouse: Dyan Rey
- Education: Wesleyan University (BA); University of New Mexico, Albuquerque (MA, PhD)

Eliot Glassheim (February 10, 1938 – December 25, 2019) was an American politician. He was a North Dakota Democratic-NPL Party member of the North Dakota House of Representatives, representing the 18th district from 1993 until 2017. He served as a Representative previously in 1975. Glassheim served on the Grand Forks City Council from 1982 to 2012. He obtained a B.A. from Wesleyan University and a M.A. and Ph.D. from the University of New Mexico. Glassheim founded Dr. Eliot's Twice Sold Tales, a used bookstore, which he owned until January 2015. Glassheim also wrote several books and poems.

Glassheim was the Democratic-NPL nominee for the 2016 U.S. Senate election. He lost to incumbent Republican Sen. John Hoeven by nearly 62 percentage points. He died on December 25, 2019, from lung cancer.

== Personal ==
Glassheim was Jewish.

Party political offices
| Preceded by Tracy Potter | Democratic nominee for U.S. Senator from North Dakota (Class 3); 2016 | Succeeded by Katrina Christiansen |
