= Eric Hardmeyer =

American banker (1959–2024)

Eric Hardmeyer (born July 11, 1959 - February 24, 2024) was the former president and CEO of the Bank of North Dakota. Hardmeyer was a Mott, North Dakota, native, and a graduate of the University of North Dakota, and the University of Mary. He joined the Bank of North Dakota in 1985 as a loan officer. In 2001, he was named president and CEO. In April 2021, he announced his retirement from his position.

Hardmeyer died of cancer on February 24, 2024 at his home in Bismarck, North Dakota. He is survived by his wife and four children.

Preceded by John Hoeven	President of the Bank of North Dakota; 2001–2021	Succeeded by Todd Steinwand
