= Aaron Krauter =

American politician

Member of the North Dakota Senate from the 31st district
- In office 1990–2009
- Succeeded by: Terryl L. Jacobs

Personal details
- Born: July 21, 1956 (age 70) Dickinson, North Dakota
- Party: North Dakota Democratic-NPL Party
- Spouse: Cindy
- Education: University of Mary
- Profession: businessman, farmer

Aaron Krauter is a North Dakota Democratic-NPL Party politician who served in the North Dakota Senate, representing the 35th district from 1990 to 2002 and the 31st district from 2003 to 2009. While in the Senate, Krauter served as Assistant Minority Leader from December 1996 until April 17, 1999, when he became minority leader upon Senator Tim Mathern’s resignation. Krauter was Heidi Heitkamp's running mate in the 2000 North Dakota Gubernatorial Election but lost.

Party political offices
Preceded by Barbara Pyle	Democratic nominee for Lieutenant Governor of North Dakota; 2000	Succeeded by Deb Mathern
