= Tom Campbell (North Dakota politician) =

American politician

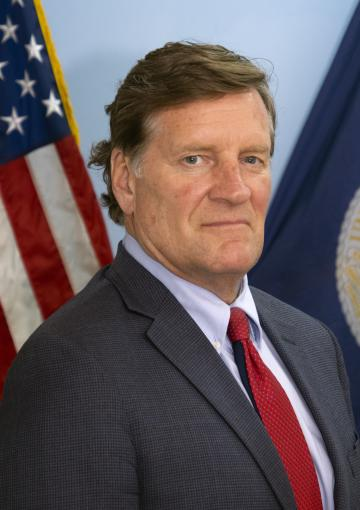
- Official portrait, 2025

North Dakota Director for USDA Rural Development
- Incumbent
- Assumed office May 2, 2025
- President: Donald Trump
- Preceded by: Erin Oban

Member of the North Dakota Senate from the 19th district
- In office December 1, 2012 – December 1, 2018
- Preceded by: Gerald Uglem
- Succeeded by: Robert Fors

Personal details
- Born: Thomas Scott Campbell; February 14, 1959 (age 67) Grafton, North Dakota, U.S.
- Party: Republican
- Spouse: Lori Campbell
- Children: 2
- Education: North Dakota State University (BS)

Thomas Scott Campbell (born February 14, 1959) is an American politician, farmer, and entrepreneur. He served as a Republican member of the North Dakota Senate from 2012 to 2018.

== Career ==
Campbell co-founded Campbell Farms in Grafton, North Dakota with his brothers in 1978, and the company has since expanded to multiple locations.

In 2022, Campbell Farms sold an abundance of land to groups associated with Bill Gates for millions of dollars. However, according to Campbell himself, they lease it back and allows them to continue farming.

== Politics ==
=== North Dakota Senate ===
He was first elected in 2012 to the North Dakota Senate after defeating incumbent Gerald Uglem in the primaries, followed by the general election against Dem-NPL candidate Julius Wangler. Campbell would be reelected in 2014.

During the 2013 session, Campbell was a member of the Finance and Taxation, and Transportation committees before the 2015 and 2017 sessions in which he became the vice chairman for the Industry, Business, and Labor committee.

After his term, the Democratic-NPL Party began criticising him over “not accomplishing anything” and his failed runs for national office.

=== 2018 congressional election ===
In August 2017, Campbell announced his candidacy for the Republican nomination for the United States Senate seat then held by Democrat Heidi Heitkamp. However, Campbell withdrew from the race following the entry of fellow Republican Kevin Cramer into the race, endorsing his campaign.

And in February 2018, Campbell declared his candidacy for the congressional seat to be vacated by Cramer as he ran for the senate.

Campbell did not receive the endorsement of the North Dakota Republican Party at the state party convention in April 2018, losing to fellow state Senator, Kelly Armstrong. Following his defeat at the convention, Campbell announced his intention to continue his campaign to the primary election in June 2018. But on April 11, 2018, Campbell withdrew his candidacy from the primary race.

=== 2024 congressional election ===
In June 2023, the Inforum reported Campbell as a possible contender to run for Governor in the event of incumbent Doug Burgum not running for re-election on account of his presidential campaign in 2024. In January 2024, Campbell stated he had an interest in running for Governor and outlined key issues he would run off, which included mental health, homelessness, and property taxes. Later, in an interview he stated if he were to run he would also focus on and address workforce shortages in Education, Law, and Medicine.

On January 22, Campbell declared his candidacy, with an announcement coming "within two weeks." However, on January 29, Campbell announced his candidacy in the 2024 United States House of Representatives election in North Dakota. Bypassing a second fight with Kelly Armstrong once he announced his run for the governorship.

Campbell later announced he would tour and speak with voters in towns with more than 100 people.

Campbell faced considerable attack and opposition from other candidates in the race, former state representative Rick Becker, public service commissioner Julie Fedorchak, and farmer Alex Balazs. On March 13, Campbell announced he would not attend the NDGOP endorsement convention in April, instead choosing to go to the primary. Campbell also claimed that the Fedorchak campaign threatened him, the campaign denied the allegations. And on March 27, Campbell announced he was suspending his campaign. Citing that he wouldn't run a “negative campaign.”

=== United States Department of Agriculture ===
On May 2, 2025, the United States Department of Agriculture under the Second Trump administration announced that Campbell had been selected to operate the USDA Rural Development North Dakotan branch. After his appointment, Campbell stated ″The mission of Rural Development is vital to our communities, and I am eager to connect with the leaders and stakeholders throughout our great state.″

In an interview a month into his tenure, Campbell stated he was enjoying the job, specifically outlining his staff and a visit to a Rural Development funded daycare in Park River, North Dakota.

== Personal life ==
Campbell is married to his wife, Lori, and has 2 children.

Campbell attended the Save America Rally in Washington, D.C. on January 6, 2021. He reportedly left around 3 hours before the beginning of the Capitol riot. He later recounted the story claiming he was the last to find out about the attack.

== Electoral history ==
2018 United States House of Representatives election Republican primary
Party	Candidate	Votes	%
Republican	Kelly Armstrong	37,054	56.23
Republican	Tom Campbell (withdrawn)	17,692	26.85
Republican	Tiffany Abentroth	5,877	8.92
Republican	Paul Schaffner	5,203	7.90
Republican	Write-Ins	75	0.11
Total votes		65,901	100.00

2014 Election for North Dakota's 19th Senate District
Party	Candidate	Votes	%
Republican	Tom Campbell (Incumbent)	3,109	64.81
Democratic	Robert "Tork" Kilichowski	1,679	35.00
Write-In	Others	9	0.19
Total votes		4,797	100

2012 Election for North Dakota's 19th Senate District
Party	Candidate	Votes	%
Republican	Tom Campbell	3,490	60.04
Democratic	Julius M. Wangler	2,313	39.79
Write-In	Others	10	0.17
Total votes		5,813	100
