= Gerald Uglem =

American politician (born 1947)

Member of the North Dakota Senate from the 19th district
- In office December 1, 2010 – December 1, 2012
- Preceded by: Art Behm
- Succeeded by: Tom Campbell

Member of the North Dakota House of Representatives from the 19th district
- In office December 1, 2002 – December 1, 2010
- Succeeded by: Gary Paur; Wayne Trottier

Personal details
- Born: September 18, 1947 (age 78) Sharon, North Dakota
- Party: Republican

Gerald Uglem (born September 18, 1947) is an American politician who served in the North Dakota House of Representatives from the 19th district from 2002 to 2010 and in the North Dakota Senate from the 19th district from 2010 to 2012.
