= Deb Mathern =

American politician

Member of the North Dakota Senate from the 45th district
- In office December 1, 1998 – December 1, 2002
- Preceded by: Donna Nalewaja
- Succeeded by: John Syverson

Personal details
- Party: Democratic

Deb Mathern is an American politician who served in the North Dakota Senate from the 45th district from 1998 to 2002.
