= Ryan Taylor (politician) =

American politician

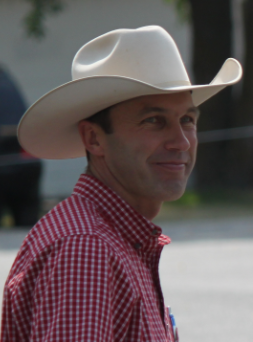

Minority Leader of the North Dakota Senate
- In office January 4, 2011 – January 8, 2013
- Preceded by: David O'Connell
- Succeeded by: Mac Schneider

Member of the North Dakota Senate from the 7th district
- In office January 7, 2003 – January 8, 2013
- Preceded by: Ken Solberg
- Succeeded by: Nicole Poolman

Personal details
- Born: July 22, 1970 (age 56) Towner, North Dakota, U.S.
- Party: Democratic
- Education: North Dakota State University (BA)

Ryan M. Taylor (born July 22, 1970) is an American politician. A member of the Democratic-NPL Party, he served as the North Dakota State Senator from the 7th district from 2003 to 2013. Taylor spent his final two years as a minority leader. He left the North Dakota Senate to run for the governorship, but was defeated by incumbent Republican Jack Dalrymple in the general election.

== Early life, education, and early career ==
Taylor is a fourth-generation North Dakotan, raised by his parents Marshall ("Bud") and Liz Taylor on a ranch near Towner in McHenry County. The Taylor Ranch, founded in 1903, was inducted into the North Dakota Cowboy Hall of Fame in 2010. Taylor graduated from Towner High School in 1988. In 1992, Taylor graduated with honors from North Dakota State University with two bachelor's degrees in Agricultural Economics and Mass Communications, and a minor in Animal & Range Sciences. While at NDSU, Taylor was active in FarmHouse Fraternity and many other clubs and associations and was an active volunteer.

Taylor founded Sandhill Communications while attending NDSU, which provides communication and marketing services for agricultural clients in the Upper Midwest and Canada. Taylor's syndicated column, "Cowboy Logic," has a circulation of more than 160,000; he is the author of three books, "A Collection of Cowboy Logic", "Cowboy Logic Continues" and "Cowboy Logic Family Style"; and he has delivered more than 200 entertaining speeches to groups and events. Taylor's early career also included directing communications for Northern Plains Premium Beef Cooperative and growing veterinary pharmaceutical sales for Fort Dodge Animal Health. Since graduating from college through present day, Taylor has managed his family ranch, which consists of nearly 2,900 acres of range and hay meadows and supports more than 200 commercial Angus cow/calf pairs.

== North Dakota Senate ==
=== Elections ===
In 2002, at age 32, Taylor was elected as state senator for District 7, which comprises McHenry and Pierce Counties and parts of Benson and Sheridan Counties. He was re-elected in 2006 and 2010.

=== Tenure ===
He received the 2010 Children's Champion award for his work fighting for the education, care and protection of North Dakota's children. In December 2010, Taylor was elected as Senate Minority Leader. During the 2011 North Dakota Legislative Assembly, he worked on broad-based tax relief, promoted public policy transparency and advocated for the needs of roads, schools and children.

=== Committee assignments ===
Taylor served on the education, agriculture and transportation standing committees, and had interim committee assignments in economic development, workforce development, natural resources and higher education.

== 2012 gubernatorial election ==
On Dec. 12, 2011, Taylor announced that he is running for the Democratic-NPL nomination in the 2012 North Dakota gubernatorial election. Taylor's priorities for office include a balanced approach to energy development; a long-term economic plan; solutions to North Dakota's water challenges, a new commitment to children's health, well-being, and education; and a common-sense government where everyone's voice is heard.

On Friday, March 16, 2012 at the North Dakota Democratic-NPL State Convention, State Senate Minority Leader Ryan Taylor accepted his party's nomination as candidate for Governor of North Dakota. He was nominated by former First Lady Grace Link and seconded by his colleague in the State Senate, Mac Schneider.

== Personal life ==
Taylor is married to Nikki (Mogen) Taylor. They have three children: Marshall, Olav, and Sylvia. Taylor is also active in his community. He is on the board of directors for Lutheran Social Services of North Dakota, and serves as treasurer for the board of Metigoshe Ministries. Taylor served on the board of directors for Hartland Mutual Insurance, and filled a vacancy on the McHenry County Board of Commissioners in 2013 and 2014. He has held leadership positions with Zion Lutheran Church, North Dakota Stockmen's Association, Dollars for Scholars, Towner Area Beef Promoters, Towner FFA Alumni, the Rural Leadership North Dakota Council, and the Souris Basin Planning Council Revolving Loan Fund. He is a trustee of the North Dakota Cowboy Hall of Fame and has been active with the Midwest Council of State Governments and the American Council of Young Political Leaders.

North Dakota Senate
Preceded by David O'Connell	Minority Leader of the North Dakota Senate; 2011–2013	Succeeded by Mac Schneider
Party political offices
Preceded by Tim Mathern	Democratic nominee for Governor of North Dakota; 2012	Succeeded by Marvin Nelson
Preceded by Merle Boucher	Democratic nominee for North Dakota Agriculture Commissioner; 2014	Succeeded by Jim Dotzenrod
