= 2010 United States Senate election in North Dakota =

- November 2, 2010
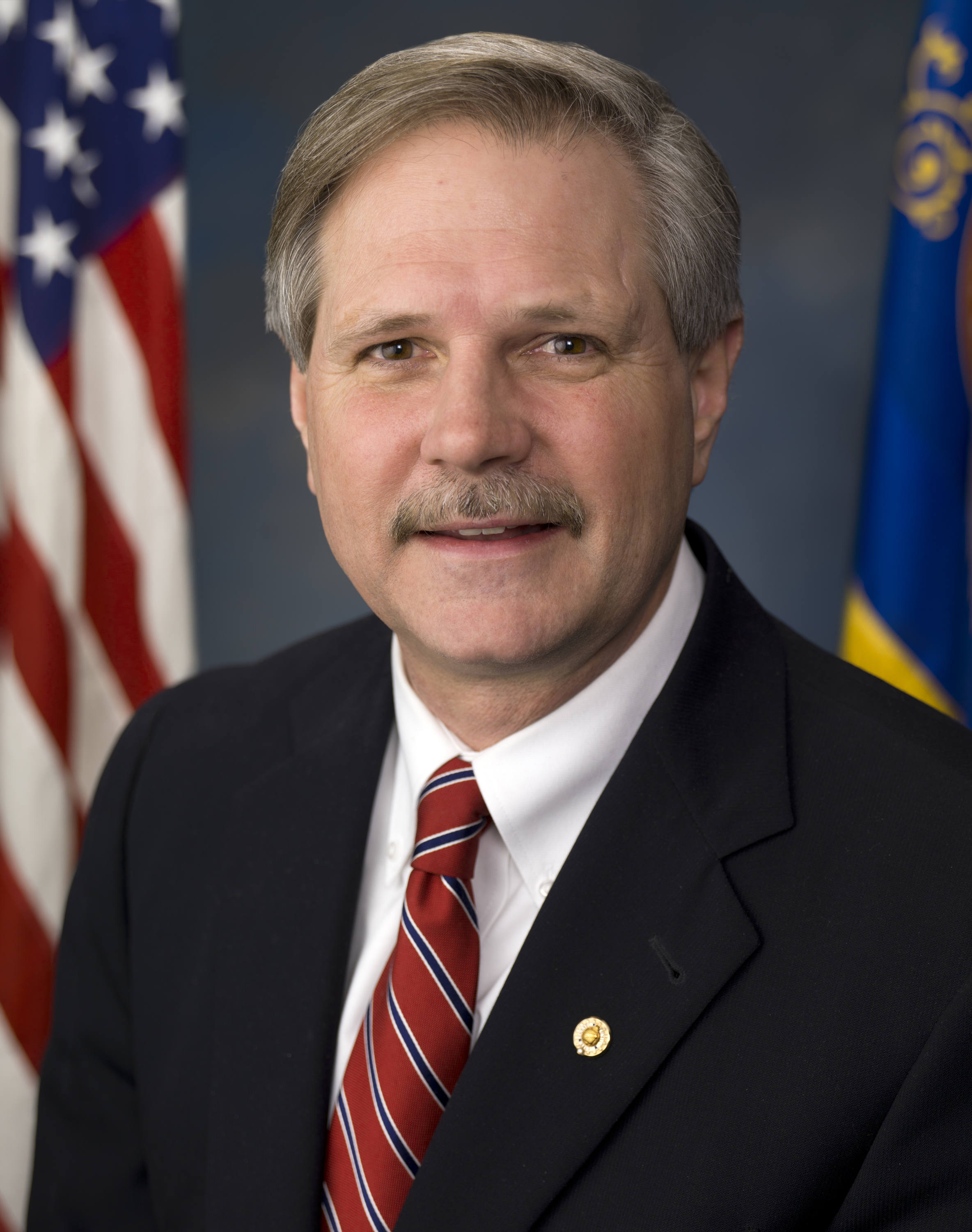

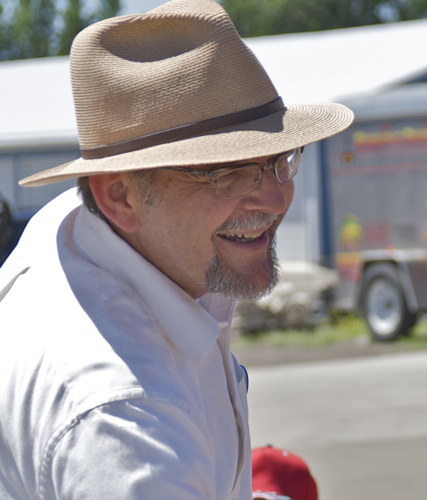
Nominee	John Hoeven	Tracy Potter
Party	Republican	Democratic–NPL
Popular vote	181,689	52,955
Percentage	76.08%	22.17%
- County results Hoeven: 50–60% 60–70% 70–80% 80–90%
U.S. senator before election
Byron Dorgan
Democratic–NPL
Elected U.S. Senator
John Hoeven
Republican

The 2010 United States Senate election in North Dakota took place on November 2, 2010, alongside other elections to the United States Senate in other states as well as elections to the United States House of Representatives and various state and local elections. Incumbent Democratic Senator Byron Dorgan announced in January 2010 that he would not seek re-election, leading to the first open seat election since 1992. Governor John Hoeven won the seat in a landslide, taking 76.1% of the vote, sweeping every county in the state, and becoming North Dakota's first Republican senator since 1987. Hoeven's 54 point margin of victory was a dramatic and historic shift from the 2004 election for this seat, when Dorgan won in a 36-point landslide and himself swept every county.

== Background ==
Incumbent Byron Dorgan never had a difficult time getting elected, as he obtained 59%, 63%, and 68% in his three senate election bids, respectively. However, in December 2009, Rasmussen Reports conducted a hypothetical matchup of Governor John Hoeven against the incumbent. Hoeven led by a large margin, 58% to Dorgan's 36%. Polls showed that 61% of the state still had a favorable view of Dorgan, and if pitted against state senator Duane Sand, the incumbent led 52% to 37%.

Several prominent members of the North Dakota Democratic-NPL Party expressed an interest in the U.S. Senate race once Senator Dorgan announced that he would not run again. Among those people were Joel Heitkamp, a former North Dakota state senator and current radio talk show host of News and Views on KFGO in Fargo. His sister, former North Dakota attorney general Heidi Heitkamp of Bismarck, also considered running, but declined to enter the race as well. Heidi Heitkamp later held North Dakota’s other Senate seat from 2013 to 2019.

Others who had indicated an interest in the race were businesswoman Kristin Hedger and national progressive talk show host Ed Schultz. Hedger was the Democratic candidate for North Dakota secretary of state in the 2006 general election, which she lost to the incumbent, Republican Alvin Jaeger. While flattered to have been asked, Schultz said he had to decline since he would have been forced to give up his nightly television program on MSNBC The Ed Show as well as his daily progressive national radio show, The Ed Schultz Show, in order to run. Also, Federal Communications Commission regulations decree that equal and free air time would have had to be given to whoever Schultz's opponents would have been in the election in order to allow them to respond to anything that Schultz would have said about them on his programs.

== Democratic-NPL primary ==
=== Candidates ===
==== Nominee ====
- Tracy Potter, state senator

==== Declined ====
- Byron Dorgan, incumbent U.S. Senator
- Kristin Hedger, manufacturing executive and nominee for North Dakota Secretary of State in 2006
- Heidi Heitkamp, former North Dakota Attorney General and nominee for Governor of North Dakota in 2000
- Ed Schultz, TV and radio talk show host

=== Results ===
Democratic-NPL primary results
Party	Candidate	Votes	%
Democratic–NPL	Tracy Potter	26,211	99.6%
Democratic–NPL	Write-in	95	0.4%
Total votes		26,306	100.0%

== Republican primary ==
=== Candidates ===
==== Nominee ====
- John Hoeven, Governor of North Dakota

==== Eliminated in primary ====
- Timothy Beattie

=== Results ===
Republican primary results
Party	Candidate	Votes	%
Republican	John Hoeven	64,978	99.8%
Republican	Timothy Beattie	130	0.2%
Total votes		65,108	100.0%

== Libertarian primary ==
=== Candidates ===
==== Nominee ====
- Keith Hanson, engineer

=== Results ===
Libertarian primary results
Party	Candidate	Votes	%
Libertarian	Keith Hanson	532	97.6%
Libertarian	Write-in	13	2.4%
Total votes		545	100.0%

== General election ==
=== Campaign ===
Hoeven was challenged in the race by North Dakota state senator Tracy Potter of Bismarck. Potter received the endorsement of the North Dakota Democratic-NPL Party at its state convention on March 27, 2010. Governor Hoeven and Senator Potter advanced to the November 2, 2010 general election following balloting in North Dakota's primary election, which was held on June 8, 2010. Neither candidate faced any significant opposition in the primary election.

Aggregate polling throughout 2010 indicated that Hoeven had large double-digit leads against Potter. Hoeven was enormously popular and enjoyed instant name recognition throughout the state of North Dakota. Having won an unprecedented third consecutive four-year term as governor in November 2008, his election in 2010 to the U.S. Senate was all but certain.

John Hoeven was sworn into the U.S. Senate on January 3, 2011. As of 2026, 2010 is the last U.S. Senate race in North Dakota where any candidate won every county.

=== Predictions ===
Source	Ranking	As of
Cook Political Report	Safe R (flip)	October 26, 2010
Inside Elections	Safe R (flip)	October 22, 2010
Sabato's Crystal Ball	Safe R (flip)	October 21, 2010
RealClearPolitics	Safe R (flip)	October 26, 2010
CQ Politics	Safe R (flip)	October 26, 2010

=== Polling ===
Poll source	Date(s) administered	Sample size	Margin of error	John Hoeven (R)	Tracy Potter (D)	Other	Undecided
Rasmussen Reports (report)	February 9–10, 2010	500	± 4.5%	71%	17%	4%	8%
Rasmussen Reports (report)	March 23, 2010	500	± 4.5%	68%	25%	2%	5%
Rasmussen Reports (report)	April 20, 2010	500	± 4.5%	69%	24%	2%	5%
Rasmussen Reports (report)	May 18–19, 2010	500	± 4.5%	72%	23%	2%	3%
Rasmussen Reports (report)	June 15–16, 2010	500	± 4.5%	73%	19%	2%	6%
Rasmussen Reports (report)	July 21, 2010	500	± 4.5%	69%	22%	2%	7%
Rasmussen Reports (report)	August 10, 2010	500	± 4.5%	69%	25%	1%	5%
Rasmussen Reports (report)	September 20–21, 2010	500	± 4.5%	68%	25%	2%	5%
Rasmussen Reports (report)	October 20, 2010	500	± 4.5%	72%	25%	0%	3%

=== Fundraising ===
Candidate (party)	Receipts	Disbursements	Cash on hand	Debt
John Hoeven (R)	$3,419,202	$2,246,827	$1,172,375	$100,000
Tracy Potter (D)	$117,739	$82,505	$35,332	$13,601
Source: Federal Election Commission

=== Results ===
General election results
Party	Candidate	Votes	%	±%
Republican	John Hoeven	181,689	76.08%	+44.36%
Democratic–NPL	Tracy Potter	52,955	22.17%	−46.11%
Libertarian	Keith Hanson	3,890	1.63%	N/A
Write-in		278	0.12%	
Total votes		238,814	100.00%	N/A
Republican gain from Democratic–NPL				

==== Results by county ====
County	John Hoeven Republican		Tracy Potter Democratic		All Others		Margin		Total votes
County	#	%	#	%	#	%	#	%	Total votes
Adams	963	81.0%	201	16.9%	25	2.1%	762	63.1%	1,189
Barnes	3,538	74.2%	1,140	23.9%	87	1.8%	2,398	50.3%	4,765
Benson	1,115	62.7%	621	34.9%	43	2.4%	494	27.8%	1,779
Billings	443	88.4%	48	9.6%	10	2.0%	395	78.8%	501
Bottineau	2,426	81.7%	497	16.7%	48	1.6%	1,929	65.0%	2,971
Bowman	1,234	84.7%	184	12.6%	39	2.7%	1,050	72.1%	1,457
Burke	667	84.4%	112	14.2%	11	1.4%	555	72.2%	790
Burleigh	25,420	77.9%	6,705	20.5%	525	1.6%	18,715	57.4%	32,650
Cass	34,882	72.0%	12,743	26.3%	843	1.7%	22,139	45.7%	48,468
Cavalier	1,503	81.6%	322	17.5%	16	0.9%	1,181	64.1%	1,841
Dickey	1,635	80.7%	364	18.0%	28	1.4%	1,271	62.7%	2,027
Divide	676	74.9%	210	23.3%	16	0.8%	466	51.6%	902
Dunn	1,236	79.5%	296	19.0%	22	1.4%	940	60.5%	1,554
Eddy	695	68.9%	281	27.9%	32	3.2%	414	42.0%	1,008
Emmons	1,262	80.8%	257	16.5%	43	2.7%	1,005	64.3%	1,562
Foster	1,165	79.8%	265	18.2%	30	2.1%	900	71.6%	1,460
Golden Valley	640	86.1%	91	12.2%	12	1.6%	549	73.9%	743
Grand Forks	14,984	73.7%	5,049	24.8%	295	1.4%	9,935	48.9%	20,328
Grant	949	81.7%	195	16.8%	17	1.5%	754	64.9%	1,161
Griggs	845	74.3%	274	24.1%	19	1.7%	571	50.2%	1,138
Hettinger	934	80.1%	205	17.6%	27	2.3%	729	62.5%	1,166
Kidder	857	74.1%	261	22.6%	38	3.3%	596	51.5%	1,156
LaMoure	1,616	77.5%	426	20.4%	44	2.1%	1,190	57.1%	2,086
Logan	800	82.7%	146	15.1%	21	2.2%	654	67.6%	967
McHenry	1,774	75.9%	516	22.1%	46	1.9%	1,258	53.8%	2,336
McIntosh	1,168	84.1%	197	14.2%	24	1.8%	971	69.9%	1,389
McKenzie	1,803	82.9%	345	15.9%	28	1.2%	1,458	67.0%	2,176
McLean	3,030	76.6%	859	21.7%	68	1.7%	2,171	54.9%	3,957
Mercer	2,895	79.4%	691	19.0%	60	1.7%	2,204	60.4%	3,646
Morton	7,422	75.3%	2,242	22.7%	196	1.9%	5,180	52.6%	9,860
Mountrail	1,450	66.9%	664	30.6%	53	2.5%	786	36.3%	2,167
Nelson	1,160	73.8%	381	24.2%	31	2.0%	779	49.6%	1,572
Oliver	726	80.2%	154	17.0%	25	2.8%	572	63.2%	905
Pembina	2,181	81.6%	447	16.7%	44	1.6%	1,734	64.9%	2,672
Pierce	1,571	81.0%	339	17.5%	29	1.5%	1,232	63.5%	1,939
Ramsey	3,253	77.7%	862	20.6%	72	1.7%	2,391	57.1%	4,187
Ransom	1,313	69.8%	538	28.6%	30	1.6%	775	41.2%	1,881
Renville	832	78.5%	209	19.7%	19	1.8%	623	58.8%	1,060
Richland	4,322	76.8%	1,205	21.4%	104	1.8%	3,117	55.4%	5,631
Rolette	2,089	52.7%	1,754	44.2%	123	3.1%	335	8.5%	3,966
Sargent	1,038	64.8%	546	34.1%	17	1.0%	492	30.7%	1,601
Sheridan	661	84.6%	111	14.2%	9	1.1%	550	70.4%	781
Sioux	426	54.5%	327	41.9%	28	3.6%	99	13.6%	781
Slope	279	82.5%	49	14.5%	10	3.0%	230	68.0%	338
Stark	6,421	82.9%	1,179	15.2%	148	1.9%	5,242	67.7%	7,748
Steele	602	66.5%	293	32.4%	10	1.1%	309	34.1%	905
Stutsman	6,011	77.4%	1,596	20.6%	156	2.0%	4,415	56.8%	7,763
Towner	767	74.5%	247	24.0%	16	1.6%	520	50.5%	1,030
Traill	2,262	73.6%	765	24.9%	48	1.6%	1,497	48.7%	3,075
Walsh	3,235	79.7%	767	18.9%	55	1.3%	2,468	60.8%	4,057
Ward	15,465	80.6%	3,453	18.0%	275	1.5%	12,012	62.6%	19,193
Wells	1,774	80.9%	387	17.7%	31	1.4%	1,387	63.2%	2,192
Williams	5,274	83.3%	939	14.8%	122	2.0%	4,335	68.5%	6,335
Totals	181,689	76.1%	52,955	22.2%	4,168	1.7%	128,734	53.9%	238,812

Counties that flipped from Democratic to Republican

- All 53
