= Ken Karls =

North Dakota political figure (born 1947)

Ken Karls (born July 15, 1947) is a North Dakota political figure who served as the Chairman of the North Dakota Republican Party from 2003 until July 2007. On May 2, 2007, Karls announced that he would not be running for another two years in the job. Karls had been the state Republican chairman for four years, and his successor, Gary Emineth, was chosen at the party's committee meeting in Fargo in July.

Under Karls's tenure as chairman, all of the party's statewide incumbents held their seats, and the party gained the North Dakota State Treasurer's office.
