= 2000 North Dakota gubernatorial election =

- November 7, 2000
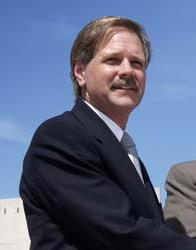

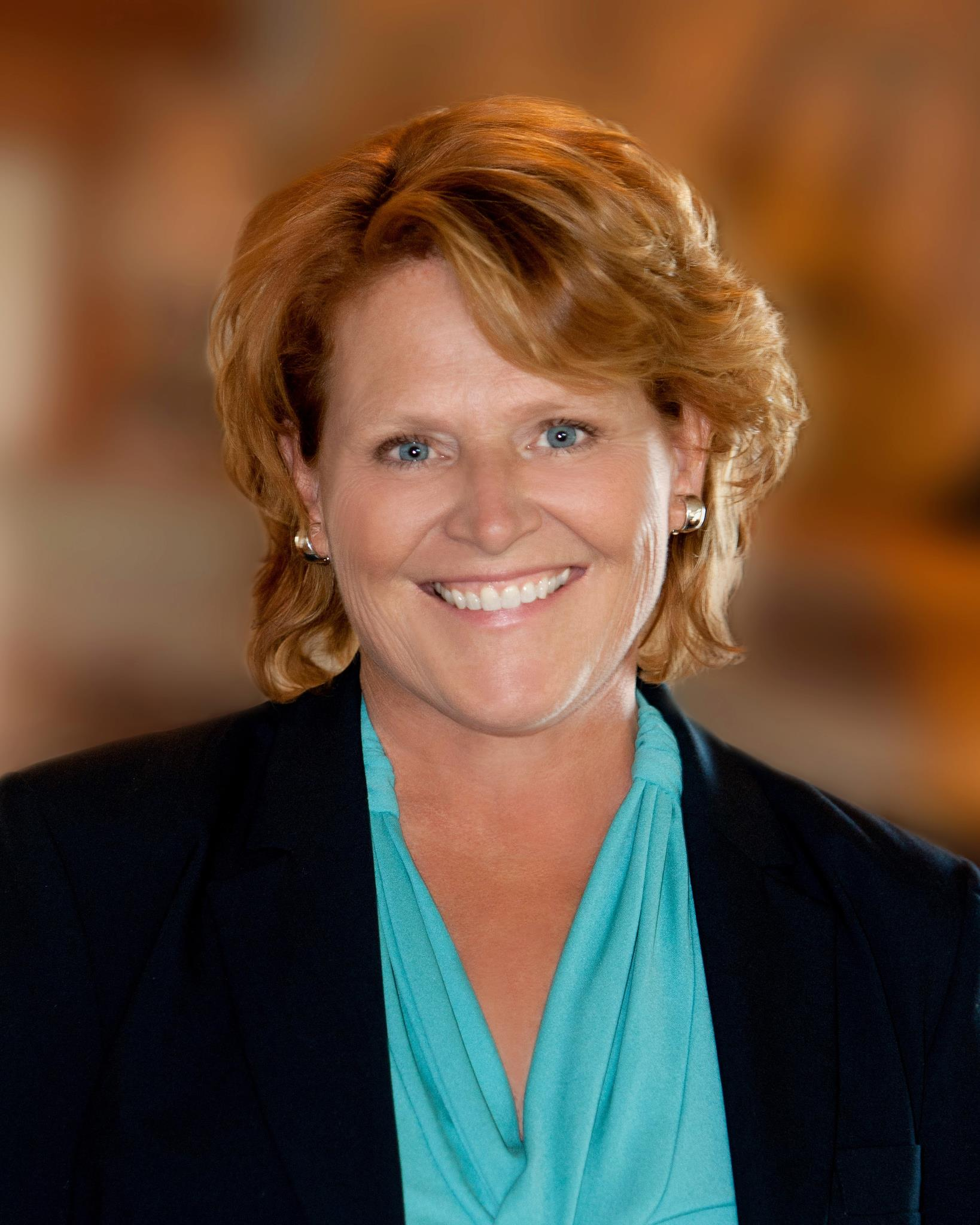
Nominee	John Hoeven	Heidi Heitkamp
Party	Republican	Democratic–NPL
Running mate	Jack Dalrymple	Aaron Krauter
Popular vote	159,255	130,144
Percentage	55.03%	44.97%
- County results Hoeven: 50–60% 60–70% Heitkamp: 50–60% 60–70% 70–80% 80–90%
Governor before election
Ed Schafer
Republican
Elected Governor
John Hoeven
Republican

The 2000 North Dakota gubernatorial election was held on November 7, 2000 to elect the governor and lieutenant governor of North Dakota. Republican incumbent Ed Schafer decided not to run for reelection. Republican John Hoeven won the election over Democratic attorney general Heidi Heitkamp. Heitkamp led in polling until early October, when reports indicated that she would undergo surgery for breast cancer. She ran advertisements to assure voters she was still fit to serve; however, by the final month, Hoeven had taken a six-point lead in polling.

As of 2026, this is the most recent North Dakota gubernatorial election in which the Democratic nominee received over 40 percent of the vote. Hoeven and Heitkamp later served alongside each other in the United States Senate from 2013 to 2019.

== General election ==
=== Candidates ===
- Heidi Heitkamp, North Dakota attorney general (Democratic–NPL)
  - Running mate: Aaron Krauter, state senator from Regent
- John Hoeven, president of the Bank of North Dakota (Republican)
  - Running mate: Jack Dalrymple, state representative from Casselton and 1992 U.S. Senate nominee

=== Debates ===
- Complete video of debate, September 13, 2000
- Complete video of debate, October 18, 2000

=== Polling ===
Poll source	Date(s)	Sample size	Margin of error	John Hoeven (R)	Heidi Heitkamp (D)	Other / undecided (Note: Calculated by taking the difference of 100% and all other candidates combined.)
Rasmussen Reports	October 21, 2000	1,258	—	50%	44%	6%

=== Results ===
2000 North Dakota gubernatorial election
Party	Candidate	Votes	%	±%
Republican	John Hoeven; Jack Dalrymple	159,255	55.03	▼11.16
Democratic–NPL	Heidi Heitkamp; Aaron Krauter	130,144	44.97	▲11.16
Write-in		13	0.00	N/A
Majority		29,111	10.06%	▼22.32
Total votes		289,412	100.00	
Republican hold				

==== Counties that flipped from Republican to Democratic ====
- Divide (largest city: Crosby)
- Sioux (largest CDP: Cannon Ball)
- Benson (largest CDP: Fort Totten)
- Name (largest city: Stanley)
- Nelson (largest city: Lakota)
- Ransom (largest city: Lisbon)
- Richland (largest city: Wahpeton)
- Sargent (largest city: Gwinner)
- Towner (largest city: Cando)
