= Gary Emineth =

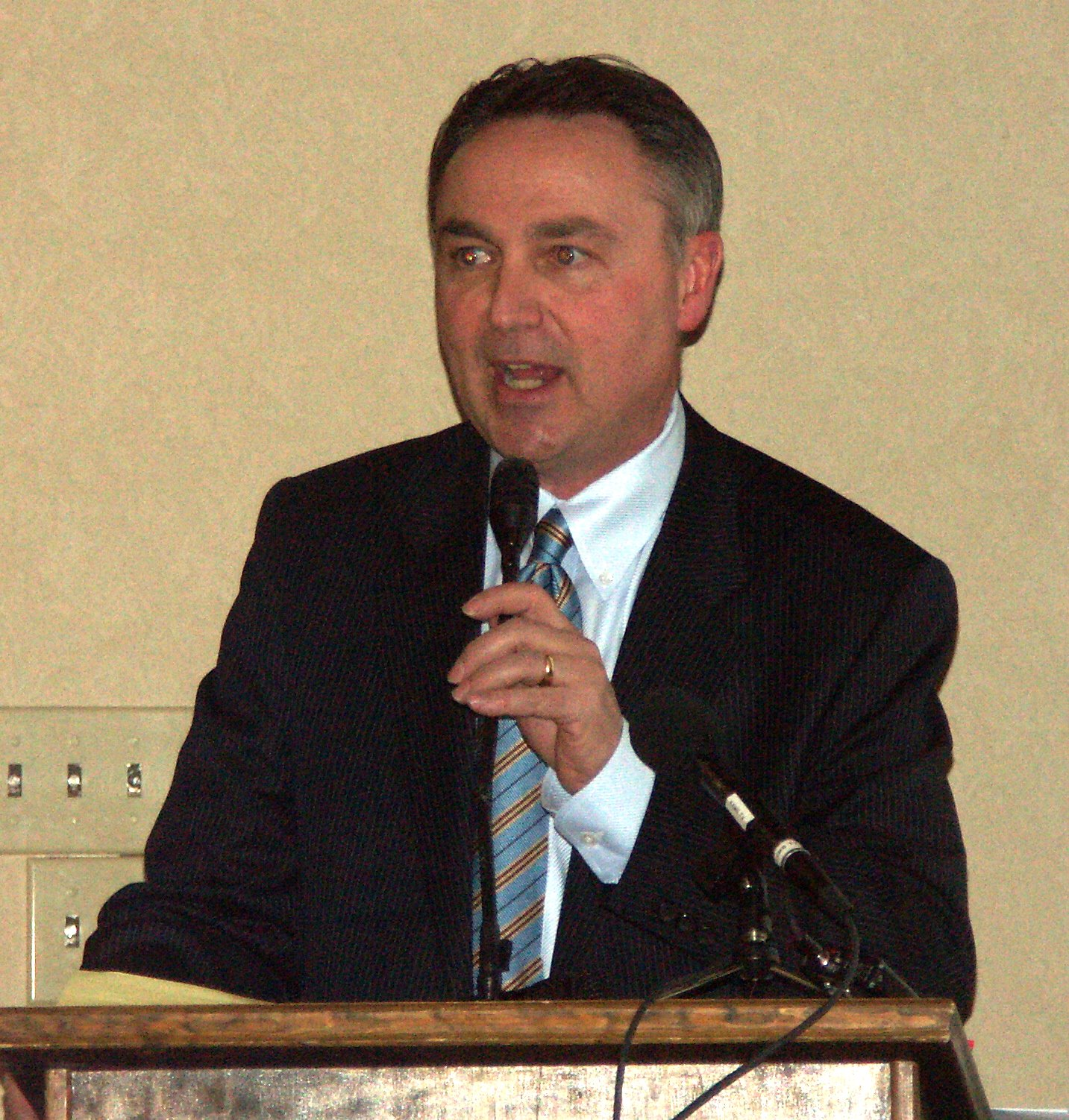

Chair of the North Dakota Republican Party
- In office 2007–2010
- Preceded by: Ken Karls
- Succeeded by: Stan Stein

Personal details
- Born: October 24, 1958 (age 67) Washburn, North Dakota, U.S.
- Party: Republican

Gary Lee Emineth (born October 24, 1958) is an American businessman and political figure. He is the former chairman of the North Dakota Republican Party and a former member of the Republican National Committee, having served in both positions from 2007 to 2010. Emineth served as an at-large delegate to the 2016 Republican National Convention from North Dakota. Emineth served on the Washburn, North Dakota city council in the early 1980s and lost a bid for seat in the North Dakota House of Representatives in 1984.

In the 2010 election, he led the North Dakota Republican Party as every Republican candidate for statewide office won election, including US representative and US senator. During both of his terms as state party chairman, Republicans significantly increased their majorities in both houses of the state legislature.

On January 31, 2018, Emineth announced his intention to challenge Senator Heidi Heitkamp in the 2018 election. However, he withdrew from the race.
