= Essman =

Essman is a surname. Notable people with the surname include:

- Rauni Essman (1918–1999), Finnish sprinter
- Susie Essman (born 1955), American stand-up comedian, actress, writer, and television producer
- Charlie Essman (fl. 1920)
