= Tim Mathern =

American politician

Member of the North Dakota Senate from the 11th district
- Incumbent
- Assumed office January 1986

Personal details
- Born: Timothy Mathern; April 19, 1950 (age 76) Edgeley, North Dakota, U.S.
- Party: Democratic
- Education: North Dakota State University (BA); University of Nebraska–Lincoln (MA); Harvard University (MPA)

Timothy Mathern (born April 19, 1950) is an American politician and state senator in North Dakota. He also unsuccessfully ran for Governor of North Dakota in 2008.

== Early life and education ==
Mathern grew up on a dairy and grain farm near Edgeley, North Dakota with 12 brothers and sisters. He attended public school in Edgeley before attending Cardinal Muench Seminary in Fargo. For three summers he served in the Latin American Mission Program in Mexico. Mathern graduated from North Dakota State University and received his master's degree from the University of Nebraska–Lincoln. He was a VISTA volunteer for one year. At age 50, Mathern earned a Master's in Public Administration from Harvard University in Cambridge MA.

== Political career ==
In 1986 Mathern was elected to the North Dakota Senate. He has served on the Senate Appropriations, Education, Long Term Care, and Tribal and State Relations, Transportation, Political Subdivisions, Human Services, Health Care and Budget Section committees. He is a member of the Council of State Governments and serves on the Health and Human Services Committee of the Midwestern Legislative Conference of the CSG. Mathern has served as Senate Assistant Majority leader and as Senate Minority Leader. He was the Democratic-NPL candidate for governor in 2008 and state treasurer in 2016. In 2018 he was elected to another 4-year term of the Senate.

In 2023, Mathern was the only democrat in the North Dakota Senate to vote for a bill which would criminalize all abortions which occur after six weeks of gestation, with no exceptions for rape or incest.

== Other activities ==
Mathern has been an active member of many organizations including Fargo-Cass County Economic Development Corporation, Catholic Charities of North Dakota, Bush Foundation of ND, SD, and MN, Prairie Roots Food Cooperative, PrairieRoots Community Fund, and Indigenous Association Fargo. He is the legislative appointee to the University of North Dakota School of Medicine and Health Sciences in Grand Forks. He is a governor's appointee of the state board for the National Corporation for Community Service.

For 30 years, Mathern directed family life and child services programs including marriage preparation, family life education, adoption and foster care. For 6 years he was the administrator of the Church of Nativity. While serving the residents of North Dakota, Mathern has been involved in the ND Health Care Task Force, the Japan-US Health Care Project, International Flood Control Netherlands Project, and Wellspring for the World. He received the 2000 Prairie Peacemaker Award from the North Dakota Peace Coalition and the 2014 Hero Housing Award from HUD.

In addition to his legislative duties, Mathern is a public policy director for Prairie St. John's, a behavioral healthcare organization.

== Personal life ==
Mathern lives with his family in Fargo, North Dakota. All of his four children are married. He has seven living grandchildren. As a hobby, he enjoys working with wood and community building activities.

== See also ==
- 2008 North Dakota gubernatorial election

Party political offices
Preceded by Joe Satrom	Democratic nominee for Governor of North Dakota; 2008	Succeeded by Ryan Taylor
Preceded by Ross Mushik	Democratic nominee for Treasurer of North Dakota; 2016	Succeeded by Mark Haugen
