= Political party strength in North Dakota =

Politics in the US state of North Dakota

The following table indicates the party of elected officials in the U.S. state of North Dakota:

- Governor
- Lieutenant Governor
- Secretary of State
- Attorney General
- State Treasurer
- State Auditor
- State Insurance Commissioner
- State Commissioner of Agriculture and Labor/State Agriculture Commissioner/State Labor Commissioner (Note: The Commissioner of Agriculture and Labor was an elected official who headed the state Department of Agriculture and Labor. The office was established by the state constitution in 1889 but was split into two separate offices—the Commissioner of Labor and the Commissioner of Agriculture—in 1966, when the two departments also split due to a constitutional change approved by the electorate in 1964.)
- State Tax Commissioner
- Superintendent of Public Instruction

The table also indicates the historical party composition in the:

- State Senate
- State House of Representatives
- State Public Service Commission
- State delegation to the United States Senate
- State delegation to the United States House of Representatives

For years in which a United States presidential election was held, the table indicates which party's nominees received the state's electoral votes.

== 1889–1916 ==
Year	Executive offices									State Legislature		RR Com.	United States Congress			Electoral votes
Year	Governor	Lt. Governor	Sec. of State	Attorney General	Treasurer	Auditor	Ins. Comm.	Ag. & Lab. Comm.	Supt. of Pub. Inst.	Senate	House	RR Com.	Senator (Class I)	Senator (Class III)	House	Electoral votes
1889	John Miller (R)	Alfred Dickey (R)	John Flittie (R)	George F. Goodwin (R)	Lewis E. Booker (R)	John P. Bray (R) (Note: Resigned.)	A.L. Carey (R)	Henry T. Helgesen (R)	William Mitchell (R) (Note: Died in office.)	25R, 6D	58R, 4D	3R	Lyman R. Casey (R)	Gilbert A. Pierce (R)	Henry C. Hansbrough (R)	
1890	John Miller (R)	Alfred Dickey (R)	John Flittie (R)	George F. Goodwin (R)	Lewis E. Booker (R)	John P. Bray (R)	A.L. Carey (R)	Henry T. Helgesen (R)	William J. Clapp (R) (Note: Appointed by governor to fill a vacancy.)	25R, 6D	58R, 4D	3R	Lyman R. Casey (R)	Gilbert A. Pierce (R)	Henry C. Hansbrough (R)	
1891	Andrew H. Burke (R)	Roger Allin (R)	John Flittie (R)	Clarence A. M. Spencer (R)	Lewis E. Booker (R)	John P. Bray (R)	A.L. Carey (R)	Henry T. Helgesen (R)	John Ogden (R)	23R, 6D, 2FA	40R, 16D, 6FA	3R	Lyman R. Casey (R)	Henry C. Hansbrough (R)	Martin N. Johnson (R)	
1892	Andrew H. Burke (R)	Roger Allin (R)	John Flittie (R)	Clarence A. M. Spencer (R)	Lewis E. Booker (R)	Archie Currie (R)	A.L. Carey (R)	Henry T. Helgesen (R)	John Ogden (R)	23R, 6D, 2FA	40R, 16D, 6FA	3R	Lyman R. Casey (R)	Henry C. Hansbrough (R)	Martin N. Johnson (R)	
1893	Eli C. D. Shortridge (D-I)	Elmer D. Wallace (D-I)	Christian M. Dahl (R)	William H. Standish (D-I)	Knud J. Nomland (D-I)	Arthur W. Porter (D-I)	James Cudhie (D-I)	Nelson Williams (D-I) (Note: George E. Adams won the 1892 election but did not qualify for the office; Williams was appointed to the position instead.)	Laura J. Eisenhuth (D-I)	19R, 7D, 4Pop, 1Fus	33R, 16D, 13Pop	3D-I	William N. Roach (D)	Henry C. Hansbrough (R)	Martin N. Johnson (R)	1 – Weaver/ Field (Pop) ✗ 1 – Cleveland/ Stevenson (D) ✓ 1 – Harrison/ Reid (R) ✗
1894	Eli C. D. Shortridge (D-I)	Elmer D. Wallace (D-I)	Christian M. Dahl (R)	William H. Standish (D-I)	Knud J. Nomland (D-I)	Arthur W. Porter (D-I)	James Cudhie (D-I)	Nelson Williams (D-I)	Laura J. Eisenhuth (D-I)	19R, 7D, 4Pop, 1Fus	33R, 16D, 13Pop	3D-I	William N. Roach (D)	Henry C. Hansbrough (R)	Martin N. Johnson (R)	1 – Weaver/ Field (Pop) ✗ 1 – Cleveland/ Stevenson (D) ✓ 1 – Harrison/ Reid (R) ✗
1895	Roger Allin (R)	John H. Worst (R)	Christian M. Dahl (R)	John F. Cowan (R)	George E. Nichols (R)	Frank A. Briggs (R)	Frederick B. Fancher (R)	Andrew H. Laughlin (R)	Emma F. Bates (R)	25R, 4Pop, 2D	52R, 6Pop, 2D	3R	William N. Roach (D)	Henry C. Hansbrough (R)	Martin N. Johnson (R)	1 – Weaver/ Field (Pop) ✗ 1 – Cleveland/ Stevenson (D) ✓ 1 – Harrison/ Reid (R) ✗
1896	Roger Allin (R)	John H. Worst (R)	Christian M. Dahl (R)	John F. Cowan (R)	George E. Nichols (R)	Frank A. Briggs (R)	Frederick B. Fancher (R)	Andrew H. Laughlin (R)	Emma F. Bates (R)	25R, 4Pop, 2D	52R, 6Pop, 2D	3R	William N. Roach (D)	Henry C. Hansbrough (R)	Martin N. Johnson (R)	1 – Weaver/ Field (Pop) ✗ 1 – Cleveland/ Stevenson (D) ✓ 1 – Harrison/ Reid (R) ✗
1897	Frank A. Briggs (R)	Joseph M. Devine (R)	Fred Falley (R)	John F. Cowan (R)	George E. Nichols (R)	Nathan B. Hannum (R)	Frederick B. Fancher (R)	Henry U. Thomas (R)	John G. Halland (R)	24R, 4Fus, 3D	44R, 18Fus	3R	William N. Roach (D)	Henry C. Hansbrough (R)	Martin N. Johnson (R)	McKinley/ Hobart (R) ✓
1898	Joseph M. Devine (R) (Note: Succeeded to office following death or resignation of previous officeholder.)	vacant	Fred Falley (R)	John F. Cowan (R)	George E. Nichols (R)	Nathan B. Hannum (R)	Frederick B. Fancher (R)	Henry U. Thomas (R)	John G. Halland (R)	24R, 4Fus, 3D	44R, 18Fus	3R	William N. Roach (D)	Henry C. Hansbrough (R)	Martin N. Johnson (R)	McKinley/ Hobart (R) ✓
1899	Frederick B. Fancher (R)	Joseph M. Devine (R)	Fred Falley (R)	John F. Cowan (R)	Dennis W. Driscoll (R)	Albert N. Carlblom (R)	George W. Harrison (R)	Henry U. Thomas (R)	John G. Halland (R)	22R, 9Fus	55R, 5Fus, 2D	3R	Porter J. McCumber (R)	Henry C. Hansbrough (R)	Burleigh F. Spalding (R)	McKinley/ Hobart (R) ✓
1900	Frederick B. Fancher (R)	Joseph M. Devine (R)	Fred Falley (R)	John F. Cowan (R)	Dennis W. Driscoll (R)	Albert N. Carlblom (R)	George W. Harrison (R)	Henry U. Thomas (R)	John G. Halland (R)	22R, 9Fus	55R, 5Fus, 2D	3R	Porter J. McCumber (R)	Henry C. Hansbrough (R)	Burleigh F. Spalding (R)	McKinley/ Hobart (R) ✓
1901	Frank White (R)	David Bartlett (R)	Edward F. Porter (R)	Oliver D. Comstock (R)	Donald H. McMillan (R)	Albert N. Carlblom (R)	Ferdinand Leutz (R)	Rollin J. Turner (R)	Joseph M. Devine (R)	24R, 7Fus	56R, 5Fus, 1?	3R	Porter J. McCumber (R)	Henry C. Hansbrough (R)	Thomas F. Marshall (R)	McKinley/ Roosevelt (R) ✓
1902	Frank White (R)	David Bartlett (R)	Edward F. Porter (R)	Oliver D. Comstock (R)	Donald H. McMillan (R)	Albert N. Carlblom (R)	Ferdinand Leutz (R)	Rollin J. Turner (R)	Joseph M. Devine (R)	24R, 7Fus	56R, 5Fus, 1?	3R	Porter J. McCumber (R)	Henry C. Hansbrough (R)	Thomas F. Marshall (R)	McKinley/ Roosevelt (R) ✓
1903	Frank White (R)	David Bartlett (R)	Edward F. Porter (R)	Carl N. Frich (R)	Donald H. McMillan (R)	Herbert L. Holmes (R)	Ferdinand Leutz (R)	Rollin J. Turner (R)	Walter L. Stockwell (R)	30R, 7D, 3Fus	86R, 11D, 2Fus, 1I	3R	Porter J. McCumber (R)	Henry C. Hansbrough (R)	2R	McKinley/ Roosevelt (R) ✓
1904	Frank White (R)	David Bartlett (R)	Edward F. Porter (R)	Carl N. Frich (R)	Donald H. McMillan (R)	Herbert L. Holmes (R)	Ferdinand Leutz (R)	Rollin J. Turner (R)	Walter L. Stockwell (R)	30R, 7D, 3Fus	86R, 11D, 2Fus, 1I	3R	Porter J. McCumber (R)	Henry C. Hansbrough (R)	2R	McKinley/ Roosevelt (R) ✓
1905	Elmore Y. Sarles (R)	David Bartlett (R)	Edward F. Porter (R)	Carl N. Frich (R)	Albert Peterson (R)	Herbert L. Holmes (R)	Ernest C. Cooper (R)	William C. Gilbreath (R)	Walter L. Stockwell (R)	33R, 6D, 1I	99R, 1D	3R	Porter J. McCumber (R)	Henry C. Hansbrough (R)	2R	Roosevelt/ Fairbanks (R) ✓
1906	Elmore Y. Sarles (R)	David Bartlett (R)	Edward F. Porter (R)	Carl N. Frich (R)	Albert Peterson (R)	Herbert L. Holmes (R)	Ernest C. Cooper (R)	William C. Gilbreath (R)	Walter L. Stockwell (R)	33R, 6D, 1I	99R, 1D	3R	Porter J. McCumber (R)	Henry C. Hansbrough (R)	2R	Roosevelt/ Fairbanks (R) ✓
1907	John Burke (D)	Robert S. Lewis (R)	Alfred Blaisdell (R)	Thomas F. McCue (R)	Albert Peterson (R)	Herbert L. Holmes (R)	Ernest C. Cooper (R)	William C. Gilbreath (R)	Walter L. Stockwell (R)	33R, 7D	87R, 12D, 1I	3R	Porter J. McCumber (R)	Henry C. Hansbrough (R)	2R	Roosevelt/ Fairbanks (R) ✓
1908	John Burke (D)	Robert S. Lewis (R)	Alfred Blaisdell (R)	Thomas F. McCue (R)	Albert Peterson (R)	Herbert L. Holmes (R)	Ernest C. Cooper (R)	William C. Gilbreath (R)	Walter L. Stockwell (R)	33R, 7D	87R, 12D, 1I	3R	Porter J. McCumber (R)	Henry C. Hansbrough (R)	2R	Roosevelt/ Fairbanks (R) ✓
1909	John Burke (D)	Robert S. Lewis (R)	Alfred Blaisdell (R)	Andrew Miller (R)	George L. Bickford (R)	David K. Brightbill (R)	Ernest C. Cooper (R)	William C. Gilbreath (R)	Walter L. Stockwell (R)	38R, 8D, 1I	92R, 8D	3R	Porter J. McCumber (R)	Martin N. Johnson (R)	2R	Taft/ Sherman (R) ✓
1909	John Burke (D)	Robert S. Lewis (R)	Alfred Blaisdell (R)	Andrew Miller (R)	George L. Bickford (R)	David K. Brightbill (R)	Ernest C. Cooper (R)	William C. Gilbreath (R)	Walter L. Stockwell (R)	38R, 8D, 1I	92R, 8D	3R	Porter J. McCumber (R)	Fountain L. Thompson (D)	2R	Taft/ Sherman (R) ✓
1910	John Burke (D)	Robert S. Lewis (R)	Alfred Blaisdell (R)	Andrew Miller (R)	George L. Bickford (R)	David K. Brightbill (R)	Ernest C. Cooper (R)	William C. Gilbreath (R)	Walter L. Stockwell (R)	38R, 8D, 1I	92R, 8D	3R	Porter J. McCumber (R)	William E. Purcell (D)	2R	Taft/ Sherman (R) ✓
1911	John Burke (D)	Usher L. Burdick (R)	Patrick Norton (R)	Andrew Miller (R)	Gunder Olson (R)	David K. Brightbill (R)	Walter C. Taylor (R)	William C. Gilbreath (R)	Edwin J. Taylor (R)	44R, 4D, 1I	90R, 12D, 1S	3R	Porter J. McCumber (R)	Asle Gronna (R)	2R	Taft/ Sherman (R) ✓
1912	John Burke (D)	Usher L. Burdick (R)	Patrick Norton (R)	Andrew Miller (R)	Gunder Olson (R)	David K. Brightbill (R)	Walter C. Taylor (R)	William C. Gilbreath (R)	Edwin J. Taylor (R)	44R, 4D, 1I	90R, 12D, 1S	3R	Porter J. McCumber (R)	Asle Gronna (R)	2R	Taft/ Sherman (R) ✓
1913	L. B. Hanna (R)	Anton Kraabel (R)	Thomas Hall (R)	Andrew Miller (R)	Gunder Olson (R)	Carl O. Jorgenson (R)	Walter C. Taylor (R)	William C. Gilbreath (R)	Edwin J. Taylor (R)	43R, 6D	102R, 8D	3R	Porter J. McCumber (R)	Asle Gronna (R)	3R	Wilson/ Marshall (D) ✓
1914	L. B. Hanna (R)	Anton Kraabel (R)	Thomas Hall (R)	Andrew Miller (R)	Gunder Olson (R)	Carl O. Jorgenson (R)	Walter C. Taylor (R)	William C. Gilbreath (R)	Edwin J. Taylor (R)	43R, 6D	102R, 8D	3R	Porter J. McCumber (R)	Asle Gronna (R)	3R	Wilson/ Marshall (D) ✓
1915	L. B. Hanna (R)	John H. Fraine (R)	Thomas Hall (R)	Henry Linde (R)	John Steen (R)	Carl O. Jorgenson (R)	Walter C. Taylor (R)	Robert F. Flint (R)	Edwin J. Taylor (R)	44R, 5D	106R, 6D	3R	Porter J. McCumber (R)	Asle Gronna (R)	3R	Wilson/ Marshall (D) ✓
1916	L. B. Hanna (R)	John H. Fraine (R)	Thomas Hall (R)	Henry Linde (R)	John Steen (R)	Carl O. Jorgenson (R)	Walter C. Taylor (R)	Robert F. Flint (R)	Edwin J. Taylor (R)	44R, 5D	106R, 6D	3R	Porter J. McCumber (R)	Asle Gronna (R)	3R	Wilson/ Marshall (D) ✓

== 1917–2000 ==
Year	Executive offices											State Legislature		Pub. Ser. Com. (Note: Named North Dakota Railroad Commission until 1940.)	United States Congress			Electoral votes
Year	Governor	Lt. Governor	Sec. of State	Attorney General	Treasurer	Auditor	Ins. Comm.	Ag. Comm.	Labor Comm.	Tax Comm.	Supt. of Pub. Inst.	Senate	House	Pub. Ser. Com.	Senator (Class I)	Senator (Class III)	House	Electoral votes
1917	Lynn Frazier (R-NPL) (Note: Recalled.)	Anton Kraabel (R)	Thomas Hall (R-NPL)	Bill Langer (R-NPL)	John Steen (R)	Carl R. Kositzky (R-NPL)	Sveinung A. Olsness (R-NPL)	John N. Hagan (R-NPL)		No such office (Note: Office established in 1919.)	Neil C. MacDonald (NP/R-NPL)	43R, 6D	97R, 17D	3R	Porter J. McCumber (R)	Asle Gronna (R)	3R	Wilson/ Marshall (D) ✓
1918	Lynn Frazier (R-NPL)	Anton Kraabel (R)	Thomas Hall (R-NPL)	Bill Langer (R-NPL)	John Steen (R)	Carl R. Kositzky (R-NPL)	Sveinung A. Olsness (R-NPL)	John N. Hagan (R-NPL)		No such office	Neil C. MacDonald (NP/R-NPL)	43R, 6D	97R, 17D	3R	Porter J. McCumber (R)	Asle Gronna (R)	3R	Wilson/ Marshall (D) ✓
1919	Lynn Frazier (R-NPL)	Howard R. Wood (R-NPL)	Thomas Hall (R-NPL)	Bill Langer (R-NPL)	Obert A. Olson (R-NPL)	Carl R. Kositzky (R-NPL)	Sveinung A. Olsness (R-NPL)	John N. Hagan (R-NPL)		George E. Wallace (R-NPL) (Note: The office was an appointed position from 1919 until 1940. Partisan affiliation given is that of corresponding Governor.)	Minnie J. Nielson (NP/R-IVA)	43R, 6D (35NPL, 14IVA)	99R, 14D (81NPL, 32IVA)	3R	Porter J. McCumber (R)	Asle Gronna (R)	3R	Wilson/ Marshall (D) ✓
1920	Lynn Frazier (R-NPL)	Howard R. Wood (R-NPL)	Thomas Hall (R-NPL)	Bill Langer (R-NPL)	Obert A. Olson (R-NPL)	Carl R. Kositzky (R-NPL)	Sveinung A. Olsness (R-NPL)	John N. Hagan (R-NPL)		George E. Wallace (R-NPL)	Minnie J. Nielson (NP/R-IVA)	43R, 6D (35NPL, 14IVA)	99R, 14D (81NPL, 32IVA)	3R	Porter J. McCumber (R)	Asle Gronna (R)	3R	Wilson/ Marshall (D) ✓
1921	Lynn Frazier (R-NPL)	Howard R. Wood (R-NPL)	Thomas Hall (R-NPL)	William Lemke (R-NPL)	John Steen (R)	David C. Poindexter (R-NPL)	Sveinung A. Olsness (R-NPL)	John N. Hagan (R-NPL)		George E. Wallace (R-NPL)	Minnie J. Nielson (NP/R-IVA)	49R (25NPL, 24IVA)	113R (59IVA, 54NPL)	3R	Porter J. McCumber (R)	Edwin F. Ladd (R-NPL)	3R	Harding/ Coolidge (R) ✓
1921	Ragnvald Nestos (R-IVA)	Howard R. Wood (R-NPL)	Thomas Hall (R-NPL)	Sveinbjorn Johnson (R-IVA)	John Steen (R)	David C. Poindexter (R-NPL)	Sveinung A. Olsness (R-NPL)	Joseph A. Kitchen (R-IVA)		George E. Wallace (R-NPL)	Minnie J. Nielson (NP/R-IVA)	49R (25NPL, 24IVA)	113R (59IVA, 54NPL)	3R	Porter J. McCumber (R)	Edwin F. Ladd (R-NPL)	3R	Harding/ Coolidge (R) ✓
1922	Ragnvald Nestos (R-IVA)	Howard R. Wood (R-NPL)	Thomas Hall (R-NPL)	Sveinbjorn Johnson (R-IVA)	John Steen (R)	David C. Poindexter (R-NPL)	Sveinung A. Olsness (R-NPL)	Joseph A. Kitchen (R-IVA)		C. C. Converse (R)	Minnie J. Nielson (NP/R-IVA)	49R (25NPL, 24IVA)	113R (59IVA, 54NPL)	3R	Porter J. McCumber (R)	Edwin F. Ladd (R-NPL)	3R	Harding/ Coolidge (R) ✓
1923	Ragnvald Nestos (R-IVA)	Frank H. Hyland (R)	Thomas Hall (R-NPL)	George F. Shafer (R-IVA)	John Steen (R)	David C. Poindexter (R-NPL)	Sveinung A. Olsness (R-NPL)	Joseph A. Kitchen (R-IVA)		C. C. Converse (R)	Minnie J. Nielson (NP/R-IVA)	49R (26IVA, 23NPL)	113R (57IVA, 56NPL)	3R	Lynn Frazier (R-NPL)	Edwin F. Ladd (R-NPL)	3R	Harding/ Coolidge (R) ✓
1924	Ragnvald Nestos (R-IVA)	Frank H. Hyland (R)	Thomas Hall (R-NPL)	George F. Shafer (R-IVA)	John Steen (R)	David C. Poindexter (R-NPL)	Sveinung A. Olsness (R-NPL)	Joseph A. Kitchen (R-IVA)		C. C. Converse (R)	Minnie J. Nielson (NP/R-IVA)	49R (26IVA, 23NPL)	113R (57IVA, 56NPL)	3R	Lynn Frazier (R-NPL)	Edwin F. Ladd (R-NPL)	3R	Harding/ Coolidge (R) ✓
1925	Arthur Sorlie (R-NPL)	Walter Maddock (R-NPL)	Robert Byrne (R)	George F. Shafer (R-IVA)	Chessmur A. Fischer (R)	John Steen (R)	Sveinung A. Olsness (R-NPL)	Joseph A. Kitchen (R-IVA)		Thorstein H. H. Thoresen (R-NPL)	Minnie J. Nielson (NP/R-IVA)	46R, 3D (25IVA, 24NPL)	106R, 7D (63NPL, 50IVA)	3R	Lynn Frazier (R-NPL)	Gerald Nye (NPL) (Note: Appointed by governor to fill vacancy. Later elected to office in their own right.)	3R	Coolidge/ Dawes (R) ✓
1926	Arthur Sorlie (R-NPL)	Walter Maddock (R-NPL)	Robert Byrne (R)	George F. Shafer (R-IVA)	Chessmur A. Fischer (R)	John Steen (R)	Sveinung A. Olsness (R-NPL)	Joseph A. Kitchen (R-IVA)		Thorstein H. H. Thoresen (R-NPL)	Minnie J. Nielson (NP/R-IVA)	46R, 3D (25IVA, 24NPL)	106R, 7D (63NPL, 50IVA)	3R	Lynn Frazier (R-NPL)	Gerald Nye (NPL)	3R	Coolidge/ Dawes (R) ✓
1927	Arthur Sorlie (R-NPL)	Walter Maddock (R-NPL)	Robert Byrne (R)	George F. Shafer (R-IVA)	Chessmur A. Fischer (R)	John Steen (R)	Sveinung A. Olsness (R-NPL)	Joseph A. Kitchen (R-IVA)		Thorstein H. H. Thoresen (R-NPL)	Bertha R. Palmer (NP)	49R (25IVA, 24NPL)	113R (60IVA, 53NPL)	3R	Lynn Frazier (R-NPL)	Gerald Nye (R-NPL)	3R	Coolidge/ Dawes (R) ✓
1928	Walter Maddock (R-NPL)	vacant	Robert Byrne (R)	George F. Shafer (R-IVA)	Chessmur A. Fischer (R)	John Steen (R)	Sveinung A. Olsness (R-NPL)	Joseph A. Kitchen (R-IVA)		Thorstein H. H. Thoresen (R-NPL)	Bertha R. Palmer (NP)	49R (25IVA, 24NPL)	113R (60IVA, 53NPL)	3R	Lynn Frazier (R-NPL)	Gerald Nye (R-NPL)	3R	Coolidge/ Dawes (R) ✓
1929	George F. Shafer (R-IVA)	John W. Carr (R)	Robert Byrne (R)	James Morris (R)	Berta E. Baker (R)	John Steen (R)	Sveinung A. Olsness (R-NPL)	Joseph A. Kitchen (R-IVA)		Iver A. Acker (R)	Bertha R. Palmer (NP)	48R, 1D (26NPL, 23IVA)	112R, 1D (65IVA, 48NPL)	3R	Lynn Frazier (R-NPL)	Gerald Nye (R-NPL)	3R	Hoover/ Curtis (R) ✓
1930	George F. Shafer (R-IVA)	John W. Carr (R)	Robert Byrne (R)	James Morris (R)	Berta E. Baker (R)	John Steen (R)	Sveinung A. Olsness (R-NPL)	Joseph A. Kitchen (R-IVA)		Iver A. Acker (R)	Bertha R. Palmer (NP)	48R, 1D (26NPL, 23IVA)	112R, 1D (65IVA, 48NPL)	3R	Lynn Frazier (R-NPL)	Gerald Nye (R-NPL)	3R	Hoover/ Curtis (R) ✓
1931	George F. Shafer (R-IVA)	John W. Carr (R)	Robert Byrne (R)	James Morris (R)	Berta E. Baker (R)	John Steen (R)	Sveinung A. Olsness (R-NPL)	Joseph A. Kitchen (R-IVA)		Iver A. Acker (R)	Bertha R. Palmer (NP)	47R, 2D (27IVA, 22NPL)	112R, 1D (58IVA, 55NPL)	3R	Lynn Frazier (R-NPL)	Gerald Nye (R-NPL)	3R	Hoover/ Curtis (R) ✓
1932	George F. Shafer (R-IVA)	John W. Carr (R)	Robert Byrne (R)	James Morris (R)	Berta E. Baker (R)	John Steen (R)	Sveinung A. Olsness (R-NPL)	Joseph A. Kitchen (R-IVA)		Iver A. Acker (R)	Bertha R. Palmer (NP)	47R, 2D (27IVA, 22NPL)	112R, 1D (58IVA, 55NPL)	3R	Lynn Frazier (R-NPL)	Gerald Nye (R-NPL)	3R	Hoover/ Curtis (R) ✓
1933	Bill Langer (R-NPL) (Note: Removed from office by the North Dakota Supreme Court following a felony conviction to defraud the federal government.)	Ole H. Olson (R-NPL)	Robert Byrne (R)	Arthur J. Gronna (R-NPL)	Alfred S. Dale (R-NPL)	John Steen (R)	Sveinung A. Olsness (R-NPL)	John Husby (R)		Frank A. Vogel (R-NPL)	Arthur E. Thompson (NP)	44R, 5D (R-NPL maj.)	103R, 10D (R-NPL maj.)	3R	Lynn Frazier (R-NPL)	Gerald Nye (R-NPL)	1R, 1R-NPL	Roosevelt/ Garner (D) ✓
1933	Bill Langer (R-NPL)	Ole H. Olson (R-NPL)	Robert Byrne (R)	Peter O. Sathre (R-NPL) (Note: Resigned following appointment to North Dakota Supreme Court.)	Alfred S. Dale (R-NPL)	John Steen (R)	Sveinung A. Olsness (R-NPL)	John Husby (R)		J. J. Weeks (R-NPL)	Arthur E. Thompson (NP)	44R, 5D (R-NPL maj.)	103R, 10D (R-NPL maj.)	3R	Lynn Frazier (R-NPL)	Gerald Nye (R-NPL)	1R, 1R-NPL	Roosevelt/ Garner (D) ✓
1934	Ole H. Olson (R-NPL) (Note: Declared governor by North Dakota Supreme Court.)	vacant	Robert Byrne (R)	Peter O. Sathre (R-NPL)	Alfred S. Dale (R-NPL)	John Steen (R)	Sveinung A. Olsness (R-NPL)	John Husby (R)		J. J. Weeks (R-NPL)	Arthur E. Thompson (NP)	44R, 5D (R-NPL maj.)	103R, 10D (R-NPL maj.)	3R	Lynn Frazier (R-NPL)	Gerald Nye (R-NPL)	1R, 1R-NPL	Roosevelt/ Garner (D) ✓
1935	Thomas Moodie (D) (Note: After Moodie's inauguration on January 7, 1935, it was revealed that he had voted in a 1932 municipal election in Minnesota. In order to be eligible to serve as governor of North Dakota, an individual has to have lived in the state for five consecutive years before the election. The North Dakota Supreme Court determined that Moodie was ineligible to serve, and he was removed from office on February 16, 1935.)	Walter Welford (R-NPL)	James D. Gronna (R-NPL)	Peter O. Sathre (R-NPL)	John Gray (R)	Berta E. Baker (R-NPL)	Harold Hopton (R-NPL)	Theodore Martell (R-NPL)		J. J. Weeks (R-NPL)	Arthur E. Thompson (NP)	42R, 7D (R-NPL maj.)	83R, 30D (R-NPL maj.)	3R	Lynn Frazier (R-NPL)	Gerald Nye (R-NPL)	1R, 1R-NPL	Roosevelt/ Garner (D) ✓
1935	Walter Welford (R-NPL)	vacant	James D. Gronna (R-NPL)	Peter O. Sathre (R-NPL)	John Gray (R)	Berta E. Baker (R-NPL)	Harold Hopton (R-NPL)	Theodore Martell (R-NPL)		Lee Nichols (R)	Arthur E. Thompson (NP)	42R, 7D (R-NPL maj.)	83R, 30D (R-NPL maj.)	3R	Lynn Frazier (R-NPL)	Gerald Nye (R-NPL)	1R, 1R-NPL	Roosevelt/ Garner (D) ✓
1936	Walter Welford (R-NPL)	vacant	James D. Gronna (R-NPL)	Peter O. Sathre (R-NPL)	John Gray (R)	Berta E. Baker (R-NPL)	Harold Hopton (R-NPL)	Theodore Martell (R-NPL)		Lee Nichols (R)	Arthur E. Thompson (NP)	42R, 7D (R-NPL maj.)	83R, 30D (R-NPL maj.)	3R	Lynn Frazier (R-NPL)	Gerald Nye (R-NPL)	1R, 1R-NPL	Roosevelt/ Garner (D) ✓
1937	Bill Langer (R-NPL)	Thorstein H. H. Thoresen (R-NPL)	James D. Gronna (R-NPL)	Alvin C. Strutz (R-NPL)	John Gray (R)	Berta E. Baker (R-NPL)	Oscar E. Erickson (R-NPL)	John N. Hagan (R-NPL)		J. K. Murray (R-NPL)	Arthur E. Thompson (NP)	34R, 14D, 1I (R-NPL maj.)	87R, 26D (R-NPL maj.)	3R	Lynn Frazier (R-NPL)	Gerald Nye (R-NPL)	1R, 1R-NPL	Roosevelt/ Garner (D) ✓
1937	Bill Langer (R-NPL)	Thorstein H. H. Thoresen (R-NPL)	James D. Gronna (R-NPL)	Alvin C. Strutz (R-NPL)	John Gray (R)	Berta E. Baker (R-NPL)	Oscar E. Erickson (R-NPL)	John N. Hagan (R-NPL)		O. T. Owen (R-NPL)	Arthur E. Thompson (NP)	34R, 14D, 1I (R-NPL maj.)	87R, 26D (R-NPL maj.)	3R	Lynn Frazier (R-NPL)	Gerald Nye (R-NPL)	1R, 1R-NPL	Roosevelt/ Garner (D) ✓
1938	Bill Langer (R-NPL)	Thorstein H. H. Thoresen (R-NPL)	James D. Gronna (R-NPL)	Alvin C. Strutz (R-NPL)	John Gray (R)	Berta E. Baker (R-NPL)	Oscar E. Erickson (R-NPL)	John N. Hagan (R-NPL)		C. P. Stone (R-NPL)	Arthur E. Thompson (NP)	34R, 14D, 1I (R-NPL maj.)	87R, 26D (R-NPL maj.)	3R	Lynn Frazier (R-NPL)	Gerald Nye (R-NPL)	1R, 1R-NPL	Roosevelt/ Garner (D) ✓
1939	John Moses (D)	Jack Patterson (R-NPL)	James D. Gronna (R-NPL)	Alvin C. Strutz (R-NPL)	John Omland (R-NPL)	Berta E. Baker (R-NPL)	Oscar E. Erickson (R-NPL)	Math Dahl (R-NPL)		W. T. DePuy (D)	Arthur E. Thompson (NP)	39R, 10D (R-NPL maj.)	106R, 7D (R-NPL maj.)	3R	Lynn Frazier (R-NPL)	Gerald Nye (R-NPL)	1R, 1R-NPL	Roosevelt/ Garner (D) ✓
1939	John Moses (D)	Jack Patterson (R-NPL)	James D. Gronna (R-NPL)	Alvin C. Strutz (R-NPL)	John Omland (R-NPL)	Berta E. Baker (R-NPL)	Oscar E. Erickson (R-NPL)	Math Dahl (R-NPL)		Lee Nichols (R)	Arthur E. Thompson (NP)	39R, 10D (R-NPL maj.)	106R, 7D (R-NPL maj.)	3R	Lynn Frazier (R-NPL)	Gerald Nye (R-NPL)	1R, 1R-NPL	Roosevelt/ Garner (D) ✓
1939	John Moses (D)	Jack Patterson (R-NPL)	James D. Gronna (R-NPL)	Alvin C. Strutz (R-NPL)	John Omland (R-NPL)	Berta E. Baker (R-NPL)	Oscar E. Erickson (R-NPL)	Math Dahl (R-NPL)		John Gray (D) (Note: Was a first appointed by a Democratic governor, although beginning in 1940 he ran on a nonpartisan ballot.)	Arthur E. Thompson (NP)	39R, 10D (R-NPL maj.)	106R, 7D (R-NPL maj.)	3R	Lynn Frazier (R-NPL)	Gerald Nye (R-NPL)	1R, 1R-NPL	Roosevelt/ Garner (D) ✓
1940	John Moses (D)	Jack Patterson (R-NPL)	James D. Gronna (R-NPL)	Alvin C. Strutz (R-NPL)	John Omland (R-NPL)	Berta E. Baker (R-NPL)	Oscar E. Erickson (R-NPL)	Math Dahl (R-NPL)		John Gray (D)	Arthur E. Thompson (NP)	39R, 10D (R-NPL maj.)	106R, 7D (R-NPL maj.)	3R	Lynn Frazier (R-NPL)	Gerald Nye (R-NPL)	1R, 1R-NPL	Roosevelt/ Garner (D) ✓
1941	John Moses (D)	Oscar W. Hagen (R-NPL)	Herman Thorson (R)	Alvin C. Strutz (R-NPL)	Carl Anderson (R)	Berta E. Baker (R-NPL)	Oscar E. Erickson (R-NPL)	Math Dahl (R-NPL)		John Gray (NP)	Arthur E. Thompson (NP)	44R, 5D (R-IVA maj.)	103R, 10D (R-IVA maj.)	3R	Bill Langer (R-NPL)	Gerald Nye (R-NPL)	2R	Willkie/ McNary (R) ✗
1942	John Moses (D)	Oscar W. Hagen (R-NPL)	Herman Thorson (R)	Alvin C. Strutz (R-NPL)	Carl Anderson (R)	Berta E. Baker (R-NPL)	Oscar E. Erickson (R-NPL)	Math Dahl (R-NPL)		John Gray (NP)	Arthur E. Thompson (NP)	44R, 5D (R-IVA maj.)	103R, 10D (R-IVA maj.)	3R	Bill Langer (R-NPL)	Gerald Nye (R-NPL)	2R	Willkie/ McNary (R) ✗
1943	John Moses (D)	Henry Holt (D)	Thomas Hall (R)	Alvin C. Strutz (R-NPL)	Carl Anderson (R)	Berta E. Baker (R-NPL)	Oscar E. Erickson (R-NPL)	Math Dahl (R-NPL)		John Gray (NP)	Arthur E. Thompson (NP)	45R, 4D (R-IVA maj.)	106R, 7D (R-IVA maj.)	3R	Bill Langer (R-NPL)	Gerald Nye (R-NPL)	1R, 1R-NPL	Willkie/ McNary (R) ✗
1944	John Moses (D)	Henry Holt (D)	Thomas Hall (R)	Alvin C. Strutz (R-NPL)	Carl Anderson (R)	Berta E. Baker (R-NPL)	Oscar E. Erickson (R-NPL)	Math Dahl (R-NPL)		John Gray (NP)	Arthur E. Thompson (NP)	45R, 4D (R-IVA maj.)	106R, 7D (R-IVA maj.)	3R	Bill Langer (R-NPL)	Gerald Nye (R-NPL)	1R, 1R-NPL	Willkie/ McNary (R) ✗
1945	Fred G. Aandahl (R)	Clarence P. Dahl (R)	Thomas Hall (R)	Nels Johnson (R)	Otto Krueger (R) (Note: Resigned to become North Dakota Insurance Commissioner.)	Berta E. Baker (R-NPL)	Oscar E. Erickson (R-NPL)	Math Dahl (R-NPL)		John Gray (NP)	Arthur E. Thompson (NP)	46R, 3D (R-ROC maj.)	109R, 4D (R-ROC maj.)	3R	Bill Langer (R-NPL)	John Moses (D)	1R, 1R-NPL	Dewey/ Bricker (R) ✗
1945	Fred G. Aandahl (R)	Clarence P. Dahl (R)	Thomas Hall (R)	Nels Johnson (R)	Hjalmer W. Swenson (R)	Berta E. Baker (R-NPL)	Otto Krueger (R)	Math Dahl (R-NPL)		John Gray (NP)	Arthur E. Thompson (NP)	46R, 3D (R-ROC maj.)	109R, 4D (R-ROC maj.)	3R	Bill Langer (R-NPL)	Milton Young (R)	1R, 1R-NPL	Dewey/ Bricker (R) ✗
1946	Fred G. Aandahl (R)	Clarence P. Dahl (R)	Thomas Hall (R)	Nels Johnson (R)	Hjalmer W. Swenson (R)	Berta E. Baker (R-NPL)	Otto Krueger (R)	Math Dahl (R-NPL)		John Gray (NP)	Garfield B. Nordrum (NP)	46R, 3D (R-ROC maj.)	109R, 4D (R-ROC maj.)	3R	Bill Langer (R-NPL)	Milton Young (R)	1R, 1R-NPL	Dewey/ Bricker (R) ✗
1947	Fred G. Aandahl (R)	Clarence P. Dahl (R)	Thomas Hall (R)	Nels Johnson (R)	Hjalmer W. Swenson (R)	Berta E. Baker (R-NPL)	Otto Krueger (R)	Math Dahl (R-NPL)		John Gray (NP)	Garfield B. Nordrum (NP)	46R, 3D (R-ROC maj.)	111R, 2D (R-ROC maj.)	3R	Bill Langer (R-NPL)	Milton Young (R)	1R, 1R-NPL	Dewey/ Bricker (R) ✗
1948	Fred G. Aandahl (R)	Clarence P. Dahl (R)	Thomas Hall (R)	Peter O. Sathre (R)	Hjalmer W. Swenson (R)	Berta E. Baker (R-NPL)	Otto Krueger (R)	Math Dahl (R-NPL)		John Gray (NP)	Garfield B. Nordrum (NP)	46R, 3D (R-ROC maj.)	111R, 2D (R-ROC maj.)	3R	Bill Langer (R-NPL)	Milton Young (R)	1R, 1R-NPL	Dewey/ Bricker (R) ✗
1949	Fred G. Aandahl (R)	Clarence P. Dahl (R)	Thomas Hall (R)	Peter O. Sathre (R)	Albert Jacobson (R)	Berta E. Baker (R-NPL)	Otto Krueger (R)	Math Dahl (R-NPL)		John Gray (NP)	Garfield B. Nordrum (NP)	47R, 2D (R-ROC maj.)	111R, 2D (R-ROC maj.)	3R	Bill Langer (R-NPL)	Milton Young (R)	1R, 1R-NPL	Dewey/ Warren (R) ✗
1950	Fred G. Aandahl (R)	Clarence P. Dahl (R)	Thomas Hall (R)	Peter O. Sathre (R)	Albert Jacobson (R)	Berta E. Baker (R-NPL)	Otto Krueger (R)	Math Dahl (R-NPL)		John Gray (NP)	Garfield B. Nordrum (NP)	47R, 2D (R-ROC maj.)	111R, 2D (R-ROC maj.)	3R	Bill Langer (R-NPL)	Milton Young (R)	1R, 1R-NPL	Dewey/ Warren (R) ✗
1951	Norman Brunsdale (R)	Ray Schnell (R)	Thomas Hall (R)	Elmo T. Christianson (R) (Note: Removed from office following conviction on federal gambling conspiracy charges.)	Albert Jacobson (R)	Berta E. Baker (R-NPL)	Alfred J. Jensen (R)	Math Dahl (R-NPL)		John Gray (NP)	Marvell F. Peterson (NP)	47R, 2D (R-ROC maj.)	112R, 1D (R-ROC maj.)	3R	Bill Langer (R-NPL)	Milton Young (R)	2R	Dewey/ Warren (R) ✗
1952	Norman Brunsdale (R)	Ray Schnell (R)	Thomas Hall (R)	Elmo T. Christianson (R)	Albert Jacobson (R)	Berta E. Baker (R-NPL)	Alfred J. Jensen (R)	Math Dahl (R-NPL)		Burtis B. Conyne (NP)	Marvell F. Peterson (NP)	47R, 2D (R-ROC maj.)	112R, 1D (R-ROC maj.)	3R	Bill Langer (R-NPL)	Milton Young (R)	2R	Dewey/ Warren (R) ✗
1953	Norman Brunsdale (R)	Clarence P. Dahl (R)	Thomas Hall (R)	Elmo T. Christianson (R)	Ray Thompson (R)	Berta E. Baker (R-NPL)	Alfred J. Jensen (R)	Math Dahl (R-NPL)		J. Arthur Engen (NP)	Marvell F. Peterson (NP)	47R, 2D (R-NPL maj.)	112R, 1D (R-ROC maj.)	3R	Bill Langer (R-NPL)	Milton Young (R)	2R	Eisenhower/ Nixon (R) ✓
1954	Norman Brunsdale (R)	Clarence P. Dahl (R)	Thomas Hall (R)	Paul Benson (R)	Ray Thompson (R)	Berta E. Baker (R-NPL)	Alfred J. Jensen (R)	Math Dahl (R-NPL)		J. Arthur Engen (NP)	Marvell F. Peterson (NP)	47R, 2D (R-NPL maj.)	112R, 1D (R-ROC maj.)	3R	Bill Langer (R-NPL)	Milton Young (R)	2R	Eisenhower/ Nixon (R) ✓
1955	Norman Brunsdale (R)	Clarence P. Dahl (R)	Ben Meier (R)	Leslie R. Burgum (R)	Albert Jacobson (R)	Berta E. Baker (R-NPL)	Alfred J. Jensen (R)	Math Dahl (R-NPL)		J. Arthur Engen (NP)	Marvell F. Peterson (NP)	46R, 3D (R-NPL maj.)	111R, 2D (R-ROC maj.)	3R	Bill Langer (R-NPL)	Milton Young (R)	2R	Eisenhower/ Nixon (R) ✓
1956	Norman Brunsdale (R)	Clarence P. Dahl (R)	Ben Meier (R)	Leslie R. Burgum (R)	Albert Jacobson (R)	Berta E. Baker (R-NPL)	Alfred J. Jensen (R)	Math Dahl (R-NPL)		J. Arthur Engen (NP)	Marvell F. Peterson (NP)	46R, 3D (R-NPL maj.)	111R, 2D (R-ROC maj.)	3R	Bill Langer (R-NPL)	Milton Young (R)	2R	Eisenhower/ Nixon (R) ✓
1957	John E. Davis (R)	Francis Clyde Duffy (R)	Ben Meier (R)	Leslie R. Burgum (R)	Albert Jacobson (R)	Curtis G. Olson (R)	Alfred J. Jensen (R)	Math Dahl (R)		J. Arthur Engen (NP)	Marvell F. Peterson (NP)	40R, 9D-NPL	94R, 19D-NPL	3R	Bill Langer (R-NPL)	Milton Young (R)	2R	Eisenhower/ Nixon (R) ✓
1958	John E. Davis (R)	Francis Clyde Duffy (R)	Ben Meier (R)	Leslie R. Burgum (R)	Mike J. Baumgartner (R)	Curtis G. Olson (R)	Alfred J. Jensen (R)	Math Dahl (R)		J. Arthur Engen (NP)	Marvell F. Peterson (NP)	40R, 9D-NPL	94R, 19D-NPL	3R	Bill Langer (R-NPL)	Milton Young (R)	2R	Eisenhower/ Nixon (R) ✓
1959	John E. Davis (R)	Clarence P. Dahl (R)	Ben Meier (R)	Leslie R. Burgum (R)	John Erickson (R)	Curtis G. Olson (R)	Alfred J. Jensen (R)	Math Dahl (R)		J. Arthur Engen (NP)	Marvell F. Peterson (NP)	34R, 15D-NPL	65R, 48D-NPL	3R	Norman Brunsdale (R)	Milton Young (R)	1R, 1D-NPL	Eisenhower/ Nixon (R) ✓
1960	John E. Davis (R)	Clarence P. Dahl (R)	Ben Meier (R)	Leslie R. Burgum (R)	John Erickson (R)	Curtis G. Olson (R)	Alfred J. Jensen (R)	Math Dahl (R)		J. Arthur Engen (NP)	Marvell F. Peterson (NP)	34R, 15D-NPL	65R, 48D-NPL	3R	Quentin Burdick (D-NPL)	Milton Young (R)	1R, 1D-NPL	Eisenhower/ Nixon (R) ✓
1961	William L. Guy (D-NPL)	Orville W. Hagen (R)	Ben Meier (R)	Leslie R. Burgum (R)	John Erickson (R)	Curtis G. Olson (R)	Alfred J. Jensen (R)	Math Dahl (R)		J. Arthur Engen (NP)	Marvell F. Peterson (NP)	28R, 21D-NPL	70R, 41D-NPL	2R, 1D-NPL	Quentin Burdick (D-NPL)	Milton Young (R)	2R	Nixon/ Lodge (R) ✗
1962	William L. Guy (D-NPL)	Orville W. Hagen (R)	Ben Meier (R)	Leslie R. Burgum (R)	John Erickson (R)	Curtis G. Olson (R)	Alfred J. Jensen (R)	Math Dahl (R)		J. Arthur Engen (NP)	Marvell F. Peterson (NP)	28R, 21D-NPL	70R, 41D-NPL	2R, 1D-NPL	Quentin Burdick (D-NPL)	Milton Young (R)	2R	Nixon/ Lodge (R) ✗
1963	William L. Guy (D-NPL)	Frank A. Wenstrom (R)	Ben Meier (R)	Helgi Johanneson (R)	Phil Hoghaug (R)	Curtis G. Olson (R)	Frank Albers (R)	Math Dahl (R)		Lloyd Omdahl (NP/D-NPL)	Marvell F. Peterson (NP)	37R, 12D-NPL	70R, 43D-NPL	2R, 1D-NPL	Quentin Burdick (D-NPL)	Milton Young (R)	2R	Nixon/ Lodge (R) ✗
1964	William L. Guy (D-NPL)	Frank A. Wenstrom (R)	Ben Meier (R)	Helgi Johanneson (R)	Phil Hoghaug (R)	Curtis G. Olson (R)	Frank Albers (R)	Math Dahl (R)		Lloyd Omdahl (NP/D-NPL)	Marvell F. Peterson (NP)	37R, 12D-NPL	70R, 43D-NPL	2R, 1D-NPL	Quentin Burdick (D-NPL)	Milton Young (R)	2R	Nixon/ Lodge (R) ✗
1965	William L. Guy (D-NPL)	Charles Tighe (D-NPL)	Ben Meier (R)	Helgi Johanneson (R)	Walter Christensen (D-NPL)	Curtis G. Olson (R)	Karsten O. Nygaard (R)	Arne Dahl (R)		Lloyd Omdahl (NP/D-NPL)	Marvell F. Peterson (NP)	29R, 20D	65D-NPL, 44R	2R, 1D-NPL	Quentin Burdick (D-NPL)	Milton Young (R)	1R, 1D-NPL	Johnson/ Humphrey (D) ✓
1966	William L. Guy (D-NPL)	Charles Tighe (D-NPL)	Ben Meier (R)	Helgi Johanneson (R)	Walter Christensen (D-NPL)	Curtis G. Olson (R)	Karsten O. Nygaard (R)	Arne Dahl (R)		Edwin O. Sjaasstad (NP)	Marvell F. Peterson (NP)	29R, 20D	65D-NPL, 44R	2R, 1D-NPL	Quentin Burdick (D-NPL)	Milton Young (R)	1R, 1D-NPL	Johnson/ Humphrey (D) ✓
1967	William L. Guy (D-NPL)	Charles Tighe (D-NPL)	Ben Meier (R)	Helgi Johanneson (R)	Walter Christensen (D-NPL)	Curtis G. Olson (R)	Karsten O. Nygaard (R)	Arne Dahl (R)	Orville W. Hagen (NP/R)	Edwin O. Sjaasstad (NP)	Marvell F. Peterson (NP)	44R, 5D-NPL	83R, 15D-NPL	2R, 1D-NPL	Quentin Burdick (D-NPL)	Milton Young (R)	2R	Johnson/ Humphrey (D) ✓
1968	William L. Guy (D-NPL)	Charles Tighe (D-NPL)	Ben Meier (R)	Helgi Johanneson (R)	Walter Christensen (D-NPL)	Curtis G. Olson (R)	Karsten O. Nygaard (R)	Arne Dahl (R)	Orville W. Hagen (NP/R)	Edwin O. Sjaasstad (NP)	Marvell F. Peterson (NP)	44R, 5D-NPL	83R, 15D-NPL	2R, 1D-NPL	Quentin Burdick (D-NPL)	Milton Young (R)	2R	Johnson/ Humphrey (D) ✓
1969	William L. Guy (D-NPL)	Richard F. Larsen (R)	Ben Meier (R)	Helgi Johanneson (R)	Bernice Asbridge (R)	Curtis G. Olson (R)	Jorris O. Wigen (R)	Arne Dahl (R)	Orville W. Hagen (NP/R)	Byron Dorgan (NP/D-NPL)	Marvell F. Peterson (NP)	43R, 6D-NPL	80R, 18D-NPL	2R, 1D-NPL	Quentin Burdick (D-NPL)	Milton Young (R)	2R	Nixon/ Agnew (R) ✓
1970	William L. Guy (D-NPL)	Richard F. Larsen (R)	Ben Meier (R)	Helgi Johanneson (R)	Bernice Asbridge (R)	Curtis G. Olson (R)	Jorris O. Wigen (R)	Arne Dahl (R)	Orville W. Hagen (NP/R)	Byron Dorgan (NP/D-NPL)	Marvell F. Peterson (NP)	43R, 6D-NPL	80R, 18D-NPL	2R, 1D-NPL	Quentin Burdick (D-NPL)	Milton Young (R)	2R	Nixon/ Agnew (R) ✓
1971	William L. Guy (D-NPL)	Richard F. Larsen (R)	Ben Meier (R)	Helgi Johanneson (R)	Bernice Asbridge (R)	Curtis G. Olson (R)	Jorris O. Wigen (R)	Arne Dahl (R)	Orville W. Hagen (NP/R)	Byron Dorgan (NP/D-NPL)	Marvell F. Peterson (NP)	37R, 12D-NPL	58R, 40D-NPL	2R, 1D-NPL	Quentin Burdick (D-NPL)	Milton Young (R)	1R, 1D-NPL	Nixon/ Agnew (R) ✓
1972	William L. Guy (D-NPL)	Richard F. Larsen (R)	Ben Meier (R)	Helgi Johanneson (R)	Bernice Asbridge (R)	Curtis G. Olson (R)	Jorris O. Wigen (R)	Arne Dahl (R)	Orville W. Hagen (NP/R)	Byron Dorgan (NP/D-NPL)	Marvell F. Peterson (NP)	37R, 12D-NPL	58R, 40D-NPL	2R, 1D-NPL	Quentin Burdick (D-NPL)	Milton Young (R)	1R, 1D-NPL	Nixon/ Agnew (R) ✓
1973	Arthur A. Link (D-NPL)	Wayne Sanstead (D-NPL)	Ben Meier (R)	Allen I. Olson (R)	Walter Christensen (D-NPL)	Robert W. Peterson (R)	Jorris O. Wigen (R)	Arne Dahl (R)	Orville W. Hagen (NP/R)	Byron Dorgan (NP/D-NPL)	Marvell F. Peterson (NP)	40R, 11D-NPL	76R, 26D-NPL	2R, 1D-NPL	Quentin Burdick (D-NPL)	Milton Young (R)	Mark Andrews (R)	Nixon/ Agnew (R) ✓
1974	Arthur A. Link (D-NPL)	Wayne Sanstead (D-NPL)	Ben Meier (R)	Allen I. Olson (R)	Walter Christensen (D-NPL)	Robert W. Peterson (R)	Jorris O. Wigen (R)	Myron Just (D-NPL)	Orville W. Hagen (NP/R)	Byron Dorgan (NP/D-NPL)	Marvell F. Peterson (NP)	40R, 11D-NPL	76R, 26D-NPL	2R, 1D-NPL	Quentin Burdick (D-NPL)	Milton Young (R)	Mark Andrews (R)	Nixon/ Agnew (R) ✓
1975	Arthur A. Link (D-NPL)	Wayne Sanstead (D-NPL)	Ben Meier (R)	Allen I. Olson (R)	Walter Christensen (D-NPL)	Robert W. Peterson (R)	Jorris O. Wigen (R)	Myron Just (D-NPL)	Orville W. Hagen (NP/R)	Byron Dorgan (NP/D-NPL)	Marvell F. Peterson (NP)	34R, 17D-NPL	62R, 40D-NPL	2R, 1D-NPL	Quentin Burdick (D-NPL)	Milton Young (R)	Mark Andrews (R)	Nixon/ Agnew (R) ✓
1976	Arthur A. Link (D-NPL)	Wayne Sanstead (D-NPL)	Ben Meier (R)	Allen I. Olson (R)	Walter Christensen (D-NPL)	Robert W. Peterson (R)	Jorris O. Wigen (R)	Myron Just (D-NPL)	Orville W. Hagen (NP/R)	Byron Dorgan (NP/D-NPL)	Marvell F. Peterson (NP)	34R, 17D-NPL	62R, 40D-NPL	2R, 1D-NPL	Quentin Burdick (D-NPL)	Milton Young (R)	Mark Andrews (R)	Nixon/ Agnew (R) ✓
1977	Arthur A. Link (D-NPL)	Wayne Sanstead (D-NPL)	Ben Meier (R)	Allen I. Olson (R)	Walter Christensen (D-NPL)	Robert W. Peterson (R)	Byron Knutson (D-NPL)	Myron Just (D-NPL)	Orville W. Hagen (NP/R)	Byron Dorgan (NP/D-NPL)	Howard Snortland (NP)	32R, 18D-NPL	50R, 50D-NPL (Note: With the 50-50 chamber, the Democrats and Republicans negotiated a power-sharing agreement. The Democrats got the position of Speaker under Oscar Solberg, and the Republicans got control of the Appropriations Committee, and the rest of the committees were 50-50 in membership and control.)	2R, 1D-NPL	Quentin Burdick (D-NPL)	Milton Young (R)	Mark Andrews (R)	Ford/ Dole (R) ✗
1978	Arthur A. Link (D-NPL)	Wayne Sanstead (D-NPL)	Ben Meier (R)	Allen I. Olson (R)	Walter Christensen (D-NPL)	Robert W. Peterson (R)	Byron Knutson (D-NPL)	Myron Just (D-NPL)	Orville W. Hagen (NP/R)	Byron Dorgan (NP/D-NPL)	Howard Snortland (NP)	32R, 18D-NPL	50R, 50D-NPL	2R, 1D-NPL	Quentin Burdick (D-NPL)	Milton Young (R)	Mark Andrews (R)	Ford/ Dole (R) ✗
1979	Arthur A. Link (D-NPL)	Wayne Sanstead (D-NPL)	Ben Meier (R)	Allen I. Olson (R)	Robert E. Hanson (D-NPL)	Robert W. Peterson (R)	Byron Knutson (D-NPL)	Myron Just (D-NPL)	Orville W. Hagen (NP/R)	Byron Dorgan (NP/D-NPL)	Howard Snortland (NP)	35R, 15D-NPL	71R, 29D-NPL	2R, 1D-NPL	Quentin Burdick (D-NPL)	Milton Young (R)	Mark Andrews (R)	Ford/ Dole (R) ✗
1980	Arthur A. Link (D-NPL)	Wayne Sanstead (D-NPL)	Ben Meier (R)	Allen I. Olson (R)	Robert E. Hanson (D-NPL)	Robert W. Peterson (R)	Byron Knutson (D-NPL)	Myron Just (D-NPL)	Orville W. Hagen (NP/R)	Byron Dorgan (NP/D-NPL)	Howard Snortland (NP)	35R, 15D-NPL	71R, 29D-NPL	2R, 1D-NPL	Quentin Burdick (D-NPL)	Milton Young (R)	Mark Andrews (R)	Ford/ Dole (R) ✗
1981	Allen I. Olson (R)	Ernest Sands (R)	Ben Meier (R)	Robert Wefald (R)	John S. Lesmeister (R)	Robert W. Peterson (R)	Jorris O. Wigen (R)	H. Kent Jones (R)	Orville W. Hagen (NP/R)	Kent Conrad (NP/D-NPL) (Note: Resigned to take an elected seat as U.S. Senator.)	Joseph Crawford (NP)	40R, 10D-NPL	73R, 27D-NPL	2R, 1D-NPL	Quentin Burdick (D-NPL)	Mark Andrews (R)	Byron Dorgan (D-NPL)	Reagan/ Bush (R) ✓
1982	Allen I. Olson (R)	Ernest Sands (R)	Ben Meier (R)	Robert Wefald (R)	John S. Lesmeister (R)	Robert W. Peterson (R)	Jorris O. Wigen (R)	H. Kent Jones (R)	Orville W. Hagen (NP/R)	Kent Conrad (NP/D-NPL)	Joseph Crawford (NP)	40R, 10D-NPL	73R, 27D-NPL	2R, 1D-NPL	Quentin Burdick (D-NPL)	Mark Andrews (R)	Byron Dorgan (D-NPL)	Reagan/ Bush (R) ✓
1983	Allen I. Olson (R)	Ernest Sands (R)	Ben Meier (R)	Robert Wefald (R)	John S. Lesmeister (R)	Robert W. Peterson (R)	Jorris O. Wigen (R)	H. Kent Jones (R)	Orville W. Hagen (NP/R)	Kent Conrad (NP/D-NPL)	Joseph Crawford (NP)	32R, 21D-NPL	55D-NPL, 51R	2R, 1D-NPL	Quentin Burdick (D-NPL)	Mark Andrews (R)	Byron Dorgan (D-NPL)	Reagan/ Bush (R) ✓
1984	Allen I. Olson (R)	Ernest Sands (R)	Ben Meier (R)	Robert Wefald (R)	John S. Lesmeister (R)	Robert W. Peterson (R)	Jorris O. Wigen (R)	H. Kent Jones (R)	Orville W. Hagen (NP/R)	Kent Conrad (NP/D-NPL)	Joseph Crawford (NP)	32R, 21D-NPL	55D-NPL, 51R	2R, 1D-NPL	Quentin Burdick (D-NPL)	Mark Andrews (R)	Byron Dorgan (D-NPL)	Reagan/ Bush (R) ✓
1985	George A. Sinner (D-NPL)	Ruth Meiers (D-NPL)	Ben Meier (R)	Nicholas Spaeth (D-NPL)	Robert E. Hanson (D-NPL)	Robert W. Peterson (R)	Earl Pomeroy (D-NPL)	H. Kent Jones (R)	Orville W. Hagen (NP/R)	Kent Conrad (NP/D-NPL)	Wayne Sanstead (NP/D-NPL)	29R, 24D-NPL	65R, 41D-NPL	2R, 1D-NPL	Quentin Burdick (D-NPL)	Mark Andrews (R)	Byron Dorgan (D-NPL)	Reagan/ Bush (R) ✓
1986	George A. Sinner (D-NPL)	Ruth Meiers (D-NPL)	Ben Meier (R)	Nicholas Spaeth (D-NPL)	Robert E. Hanson (D-NPL)	Robert W. Peterson (R)	Earl Pomeroy (D-NPL)	H. Kent Jones (R)	Orville W. Hagen (NP/R)	Heidi Heitkamp (D-NPL)	Wayne Sanstead (NP/D-NPL)	29R, 24D-NPL	65R, 41D-NPL	2R, 1D-NPL	Quentin Burdick (D-NPL)	Mark Andrews (R)	Byron Dorgan (D-NPL)	Reagan/ Bush (R) ✓
1987	George A. Sinner (D-NPL)	Lloyd Omdahl (D-NPL)	Ben Meier (R)	Nicholas Spaeth (D-NPL)	Robert E. Hanson (D-NPL)	Robert W. Peterson (R)	Earl Pomeroy (D-NPL)	H. Kent Jones (R)	Byron; Knutson (NP/D-NPL)	Heidi Heitkamp (D-NPL)	Wayne Sanstead (NP/D-NPL)	27D-NPL, 26R	61R, 45D-NPL	2R, 1D-NPL	Quentin Burdick (D-NPL)	Kent Conrad (D-NPL) (Note: Resigned following election to Class I U.S. Senate seat.)	Byron Dorgan (D-NPL)	Reagan/ Bush (R) ✓
1988	George A. Sinner (D-NPL)	Lloyd Omdahl (D-NPL)	Ben Meier (R)	Nicholas Spaeth (D-NPL)	Robert E. Hanson (D-NPL)	Robert W. Peterson (R)	Earl Pomeroy (D-NPL)	H. Kent Jones (R)	Byron; Knutson (NP/D-NPL)	Heidi Heitkamp (D-NPL)	Wayne Sanstead (NP/D-NPL)	27D-NPL, 26R	61R, 45D-NPL	2R, 1D-NPL	Quentin Burdick (D-NPL)	Kent Conrad (D-NPL)	Byron Dorgan (D-NPL)	Reagan/ Bush (R) ✓
1989	George A. Sinner (D-NPL)	Lloyd Omdahl (D-NPL)	Jim Kusler (D-NPL)	Nicholas Spaeth (D-NPL)	Robert E. Hanson (D-NPL)	Robert W. Peterson (R)	Earl Pomeroy (D-NPL)	Sarah Vogel (D-NPL)	Byron; Knutson (NP/D-NPL)	Heidi Heitkamp (D-NPL)	Wayne Sanstead (NP/D-NPL)	32D-NPL, 21R	61R, 45D-NPL	2R, 1D-NPL	Quentin Burdick (D-NPL)	Kent Conrad (D-NPL)	Byron Dorgan (D-NPL)	Bush/ Quayle (R) ✓
1990	George A. Sinner (D-NPL)	Lloyd Omdahl (D-NPL)	Jim Kusler (D-NPL)	Nicholas Spaeth (D-NPL)	Robert E. Hanson (D-NPL)	Robert W. Peterson (R)	Earl Pomeroy (D-NPL)	Sarah Vogel (D-NPL)	Byron; Knutson (NP/D-NPL)	Heidi Heitkamp (D-NPL)	Wayne Sanstead (NP/D-NPL)	32D-NPL, 21R	61R, 45D-NPL	2R, 1D-NPL	Quentin Burdick (D-NPL)	Kent Conrad (D-NPL)	Byron Dorgan (D-NPL)	Bush/ Quayle (R) ✓
1991	George A. Sinner (D-NPL)	Lloyd Omdahl (D-NPL)	Jim Kusler (D-NPL)	Nicholas Spaeth (D-NPL)	Robert E. Hanson (D-NPL)	Robert W. Peterson (R)	Earl Pomeroy (D-NPL)	Sarah Vogel (D-NPL)	Craig Hagen (NP)	Heidi Heitkamp (D-NPL)	Wayne Sanstead (NP/D-NPL)	27D-NPL, 26R	58R, 48D-NPL	2R, 1D-NPL	Quentin Burdick (D-NPL)	Kent Conrad (D-NPL)	Byron Dorgan (D-NPL)	Bush/ Quayle (R) ✓
1992	George A. Sinner (D-NPL)	Lloyd Omdahl (D-NPL)	Jim Kusler (D-NPL)	Nicholas Spaeth (D-NPL)	Robert E. Hanson (D-NPL)	Robert W. Peterson (R)	Earl Pomeroy (D-NPL)	Sarah Vogel (D-NPL)	Craig Hagen (NP)	Heidi Heitkamp (D-NPL)	Wayne Sanstead (NP/D-NPL)	27D-NPL, 26R	58R, 48D-NPL	2R, 1D-NPL	Jocelyn Burdick (D-NPL)	Kent Conrad (D-NPL)	Byron Dorgan (D-NPL)	Bush/ Quayle (R) ✓
1992	George A. Sinner (D-NPL)	Lloyd Omdahl (D-NPL)	Jim Kusler (D-NPL)	Nicholas Spaeth (D-NPL)	Robert E. Hanson (D-NPL)	Robert W. Peterson (R)	Earl Pomeroy (D-NPL)	Sarah Vogel (D-NPL)	Craig Hagen (NP)	Heidi Heitkamp (D-NPL)	Wayne Sanstead (NP/D-NPL)	27D-NPL, 26R	58R, 48D-NPL	2R, 1D-NPL	Kent Conrad (D-NPL)	Byron Dorgan (D-NPL) (Note: Appointed by governor to fill vacancy, having already been elected to next term.)	Byron Dorgan (D-NPL)	Bush/ Quayle (R) ✓
1993	Ed Schafer (R)	Rosemarie Myrdal (R)	Alvin Jaeger (R)	Heidi Heitkamp (D-NPL)	Kathi Gilmore (D-NPL)	Robert W. Peterson (R)	Glenn Pomeroy (D-NPL)	Sarah Vogel (D-NPL)	Craig Hagen (NP)	Robert E. Hanson (D-NPL)	Wayne Sanstead (NP/D-NPL)	25D-NPL, 24R	65R, 33D-NPL	2R, 1D-NPL	Kent Conrad (D-NPL)	Byron Dorgan (D-NPL)	Earl Pomeroy (D-NPL)	Bush/ Quayle (R) ✗
1994	Ed Schafer (R)	Rosemarie Myrdal (R)	Alvin Jaeger (R)	Heidi Heitkamp (D-NPL)	Kathi Gilmore (D-NPL)	Robert W. Peterson (R)	Glenn Pomeroy (D-NPL)	Sarah Vogel (D-NPL)	Craig Hagen (NP)	Robert E. Hanson (D-NPL)	Wayne Sanstead (NP/D-NPL)	25D-NPL, 24R	65R, 33D-NPL	2R, 1D-NPL	Kent Conrad (D-NPL)	Byron Dorgan (D-NPL)	Earl Pomeroy (D-NPL)	Bush/ Quayle (R) ✗
1995	Ed Schafer (R)	Rosemarie Myrdal (R)	Alvin Jaeger (R)	Heidi Heitkamp (D-NPL)	Kathi Gilmore (D-NPL)	Robert W. Peterson (R)	Glenn Pomeroy (D-NPL)	Sarah Vogel (D-NPL)	Craig Hagen (NP)	Robert E. Hanson (D-NPL)	Wayne Sanstead (NP/D-NPL)	29R, 20D-NPL	75R, 23D-NPL	2R, 1D-NPL	Kent Conrad (D-NPL)	Byron Dorgan (D-NPL)	Earl Pomeroy (D-NPL)	Bush/ Quayle (R) ✗
1996	Ed Schafer (R)	Rosemarie Myrdal (R)	Alvin Jaeger (R)	Heidi Heitkamp (D-NPL)	Kathi Gilmore (D-NPL)	Robert W. Peterson (R)	Glenn Pomeroy (D-NPL)	Sarah Vogel (D-NPL)	Craig Hagen (NP)	Robert E. Hanson (D-NPL)	Wayne Sanstead (NP/D-NPL)	29R, 20D-NPL	75R, 23D-NPL	2R, 1D-NPL	Kent Conrad (D-NPL)	Byron Dorgan (D-NPL)	Earl Pomeroy (D-NPL)	Bush/ Quayle (R) ✗
1997	Ed Schafer (R)	Rosemarie Myrdal (R)	Alvin Jaeger (R)	Heidi Heitkamp (D-NPL)	Kathi Gilmore (D-NPL)	Bob Peterson (R)	Glenn Pomeroy (D-NPL)	Roger; Johnson (D-NPL)	Craig Hagen (NP)	Rick Clayburgh (R)	Wayne Sanstead (NP/D-NPL)	30R, 19D-NPL	72R, 26D-NPL	2R, 1D-NPL	Kent Conrad (D-NPL)	Byron Dorgan (D-NPL)	Earl Pomeroy (D-NPL)	Dole/ Kemp (R) ✗
1998	Ed Schafer (R)	Rosemarie Myrdal (R)	Alvin Jaeger (R)	Heidi Heitkamp (D-NPL)	Kathi Gilmore (D-NPL)	Bob Peterson (R)	Glenn Pomeroy (D-NPL)	Roger; Johnson (D-NPL)	Craig Hagen (NP)	Rick Clayburgh (R)	Wayne Sanstead (NP/D-NPL)	30R, 19D-NPL	72R, 26D-NPL	2R, 1D-NPL	Kent Conrad (D-NPL)	Byron Dorgan (D-NPL)	Earl Pomeroy (D-NPL)	Dole/ Kemp (R) ✗
1999	Ed Schafer (R)	Rosemarie Myrdal (R)	Alvin Jaeger (R)	Heidi Heitkamp (D-NPL)	Kathi Gilmore (D-NPL)	Bob Peterson (R)	Glenn Pomeroy (D-NPL)	Roger; Johnson (D-NPL)	appointed	Rick Clayburgh (R)	Wayne Sanstead (NP/D-NPL)	31R, 18D-NPL	64R, 34D-NPL	2R, 1D-NPL	Kent Conrad (D-NPL)	Byron Dorgan (D-NPL)	Earl Pomeroy (D-NPL)	Dole/ Kemp (R) ✗
2000	Ed Schafer (R)	Rosemarie Myrdal (R)	Alvin Jaeger (R)	Heidi Heitkamp (D-NPL)	Kathi Gilmore (D-NPL)	Bob Peterson (R)	Glenn Pomeroy (D-NPL)	Roger; Johnson (D-NPL)	appointed	Rick Clayburgh (R)	Wayne Sanstead (NP/D-NPL)	31R, 18D-NPL	64R, 34D-NPL	2R, 1D-NPL	Kent Conrad (D-NPL)	Byron Dorgan (D-NPL)	Earl Pomeroy (D-NPL)	Dole/ Kemp (R) ✗

== 2001–present ==
Year	Executive offices										State Legislature		Pub. Ser. Com.	United States Congress			Electoral votes
Year	Governor	Lt. Governor	Sec. of State	Attorney General	Treasurer	Auditor	Ins. Comm.	Ag. Comm.	Tax Comm.	Supt. of Pub. Inst.	Senate	House	Pub. Ser. Com.	Senator (Class I)	Senator (Class III)	House	Electoral votes
2001	John Hoeven (R)	Jack Dalrymple (R)	Alvin Jaeger (R) (Note: Elected as an independent in the 2018 Secretary of State election, but continued to identify as a Republican.)	Wayne Stenehjem (R)	Kathi Gilmore (D-NPL)	Bob Peterson (R)	Jim Poolman (R)	Roger Johnson (D-NPL)	Rick Clayburgh (R)	Wayne Sanstead (NP/D-NPL)	32R, 17D-NPL	69R, 29D-NPL	3R	Kent Conrad (D-NPL)	Byron Dorgan (D-NPL)	Earl Pomeroy (D-NPL)	Bush/ Cheney (R) ✓
2002	John Hoeven (R)	Jack Dalrymple (R)	Alvin Jaeger (R)	Wayne Stenehjem (R)	Kathi Gilmore (D-NPL)	Bob Peterson (R)	Jim Poolman (R)	Roger Johnson (D-NPL)	Rick Clayburgh (R)	Wayne Sanstead (NP/D-NPL)	32R, 17D-NPL	69R, 29D-NPL	3R	Kent Conrad (D-NPL)	Byron Dorgan (D-NPL)	Earl Pomeroy (D-NPL)	Bush/ Cheney (R) ✓
2003	John Hoeven (R)	Jack Dalrymple (R)	Alvin Jaeger (R)	Wayne Stenehjem (R)	Kathi Gilmore (D-NPL)	Bob Peterson (R)	Jim Poolman (R)	Roger Johnson (D-NPL)	Rick Clayburgh (R)	Wayne Sanstead (NP/D-NPL)	31R, 16D-NPL	66R, 28D-NPL	3R	Kent Conrad (D-NPL)	Byron Dorgan (D-NPL)	Earl Pomeroy (D-NPL)	Bush/ Cheney (R) ✓
2004	John Hoeven (R)	Jack Dalrymple (R)	Alvin Jaeger (R)	Wayne Stenehjem (R)	Kathi Gilmore (D-NPL)	Bob Peterson (R)	Jim Poolman (R)	Roger Johnson (D-NPL)	Rick Clayburgh (R)	Wayne Sanstead (NP/D-NPL)	31R, 16D-NPL	66R, 28D-NPL	3R	Kent Conrad (D-NPL)	Byron Dorgan (D-NPL)	Earl Pomeroy (D-NPL)	Bush/ Cheney (R) ✓
2005	John Hoeven (R)	Jack Dalrymple (R)	Alvin Jaeger (R)	Wayne Stenehjem (R)	Kelly Schmidt (R)	Bob Peterson (R)	Jim Poolman (R)	Roger Johnson (D-NPL)	Rick Clayburgh (R)	Wayne Sanstead (NP/D-NPL)	32R, 15D-NPL	67R, 27D-NPL	3R	Kent Conrad (D-NPL)	Byron Dorgan (D-NPL)	Earl Pomeroy (D-NPL)	Bush/ Cheney (R) ✓
2005	John Hoeven (R)	Jack Dalrymple (R)	Alvin Jaeger (R)	Wayne Stenehjem (R)	Kelly Schmidt (R)	Bob Peterson (R)	Jim Poolman (R)	Roger Johnson (D-NPL)	Cory Fong (R)	Wayne Sanstead (NP/D-NPL)	32R, 15D-NPL	67R, 27D-NPL	3R	Kent Conrad (D-NPL)	Byron Dorgan (D-NPL)	Earl Pomeroy (D-NPL)	Bush/ Cheney (R) ✓
2006	John Hoeven (R)	Jack Dalrymple (R)	Alvin Jaeger (R)	Wayne Stenehjem (R)	Kelly Schmidt (R)	Bob Peterson (R)	Jim Poolman (R)	Roger Johnson (D-NPL)	Cory Fong (R)	Wayne Sanstead (NP/D-NPL)	32R, 15D-NPL	67R, 27D-NPL	3R	Kent Conrad (D-NPL)	Byron Dorgan (D-NPL)	Earl Pomeroy (D-NPL)	Bush/ Cheney (R) ✓
2007	John Hoeven (R)	Jack Dalrymple (R)	Alvin Jaeger (R)	Wayne Stenehjem (R)	Kelly Schmidt (R)	Bob Peterson (R)	Jim Poolman (R)	Roger Johnson (D-NPL)	Cory Fong (R)	Wayne Sanstead (NP/D-NPL)	26R, 21D-NPL	61R, 33D-NPL	3R	Kent Conrad (D-NPL)	Byron Dorgan (D-NPL)	Earl Pomeroy (D-NPL)	Bush/ Cheney (R) ✓
2007	John Hoeven (R)	Jack Dalrymple (R)	Alvin Jaeger (R)	Wayne Stenehjem (R)	Kelly Schmidt (R)	Bob Peterson (R)	Adam Hamm (R)	Roger Johnson (D-NPL)	Cory Fong (R)	Wayne Sanstead (NP/D-NPL)	26R, 21D-NPL	61R, 33D-NPL	3R	Kent Conrad (D-NPL)	Byron Dorgan (D-NPL)	Earl Pomeroy (D-NPL)	Bush/ Cheney (R) ✓
2008	John Hoeven (R)	Jack Dalrymple (R)	Alvin Jaeger (R)	Wayne Stenehjem (R)	Kelly Schmidt (R)	Bob Peterson (R)	Adam Hamm (R)	Roger Johnson (D-NPL)	Cory Fong (R)	Wayne Sanstead (NP/D-NPL)	26R, 21D-NPL	61R, 33D-NPL	3R	Kent Conrad (D-NPL)	Byron Dorgan (D-NPL)	Earl Pomeroy (D-NPL)	McCain/ Palin (R) ✗
2009	John Hoeven (R)	Jack Dalrymple (R)	Alvin Jaeger (R)	Wayne Stenehjem (R)	Kelly Schmidt (R)	Bob Peterson (R)	Adam Hamm (R)	Doug Goehring (R)	Cory Fong (R)	Wayne Sanstead (NP/D-NPL)	26R, 21D-NPL	58R, 36D-NPL	3R	Kent Conrad (D-NPL)	Byron Dorgan (D-NPL)	Earl Pomeroy (D-NPL)	McCain/ Palin (R) ✗
2010	John Hoeven (R)	Jack Dalrymple (R)	Alvin Jaeger (R)	Wayne Stenehjem (R)	Kelly Schmidt (R)	Bob Peterson (R)	Adam Hamm (R)	Doug Goehring (R)	Cory Fong (R)	Wayne Sanstead (NP/D-NPL)	26R, 21D-NPL	58R, 36D-NPL	3R	Kent Conrad (D-NPL)	Byron Dorgan (D-NPL)	Earl Pomeroy (D-NPL)	McCain/ Palin (R) ✗
2011	Jack Dalrymple (R) (Note: Succeeded to office following death or resignation of previous officeholder. Later elected to office in their own right.)	Drew Wrigley (R)	Alvin Jaeger (R)	Wayne Stenehjem (R)	Kelly Schmidt (R)	Bob Peterson (R)	Adam Hamm (R)	Doug Goehring (R)	Cory Fong (R)	Wayne Sanstead (NP/D-NPL)	35R, 12D-NPL	69R, 25D-NPL	3R	Kent Conrad (D-NPL)	John Hoeven (R)	Rick Berg (R)	McCain/ Palin (R) ✗
2012	Jack Dalrymple (R)	Drew Wrigley (R)	Alvin Jaeger (R)	Wayne Stenehjem (R)	Kelly Schmidt (R)	Bob Peterson (R)	Adam Hamm (R)	Doug Goehring (R)	Cory Fong (R)	Wayne Sanstead (NP/D-NPL)	35R, 12D-NPL	69R, 25D-NPL	3R	Kent Conrad (D-NPL)	John Hoeven (R)	Rick Berg (R)	Romney/ Ryan (R) ✗
2013	Jack Dalrymple (R)	Drew Wrigley (R)	Alvin Jaeger (R)	Wayne Stenehjem (R)	Kelly Schmidt (R)	Bob Peterson (R)	Adam Hamm (R)	Doug Goehring (R)	Cory Fong (R)	Kirsten Baesler (NP/R)	33R, 14D-NPL	71R, 23D-NPL	3R	Heidi Heitkamp (D-NPL)	John Hoeven (R)	Kevin Cramer (R)	Romney/ Ryan (R) ✗
2014	Jack Dalrymple (R)	Drew Wrigley (R)	Alvin Jaeger (R)	Wayne Stenehjem (R)	Kelly Schmidt (R)	Bob Peterson (R)	Adam Hamm (R)	Doug Goehring (R)	Ryan; Rauschenberger (R)	Kirsten Baesler (NP/R)	33R, 14D-NPL	71R, 23D-NPL	3R	Heidi Heitkamp (D-NPL)	John Hoeven (R)	Kevin Cramer (R)	Romney/ Ryan (R) ✗
2015	Jack Dalrymple (R)	Drew Wrigley (R)	Alvin Jaeger (R)	Wayne Stenehjem (R)	Kelly Schmidt (R)	Bob Peterson (R)	Adam Hamm (R)	Doug Goehring (R)	Ryan; Rauschenberger (R)	Kirsten Baesler (NP/R)	32R, 15D-NPL	71R, 23D-NPL	3R	Heidi Heitkamp (D-NPL)	John Hoeven (R)	Kevin Cramer (R)	Romney/ Ryan (R) ✗
2016	Jack Dalrymple (R)	Drew Wrigley (R)	Alvin Jaeger (R)	Wayne Stenehjem (R)	Kelly Schmidt (R)	Bob Peterson (R)	Adam Hamm (R)	Doug Goehring (R)	Ryan; Rauschenberger (R)	Kirsten Baesler (NP/R)	32R, 15D-NPL	71R, 23D-NPL	3R	Heidi Heitkamp (D-NPL)	John Hoeven (R)	Kevin Cramer (R)	Trump/ Pence (R) ✓
2017	Doug Burgum (R)	Brent Sanford (R)	Alvin Jaeger (R)	Wayne Stenehjem (R)	Kelly Schmidt (R)	Josh Gallion (R)	Jon Godfread (R)	Doug Goehring (R)	Ryan; Rauschenberger (R)	Kirsten Baesler (NP/R)	38R, 9D-NPL	81R, 13D-NPL	3R	Heidi Heitkamp (D-NPL)	John Hoeven (R)	Kevin Cramer (R)	Trump/ Pence (R) ✓
2018	Doug Burgum (R)	Brent Sanford (R)	Alvin Jaeger (R)	Wayne Stenehjem (R)	Kelly Schmidt (R)	Josh Gallion (R)	Jon Godfread (R)	Doug Goehring (R)	Ryan; Rauschenberger (R)	Kirsten Baesler (NP/R)	38R, 9D-NPL	81R, 13D-NPL	3R	Heidi Heitkamp (D-NPL)	John Hoeven (R)	Kevin Cramer (R)	Trump/ Pence (R) ✓
2019	Doug Burgum (R)	Brent Sanford (R)	Alvin Jaeger (R)	Wayne Stenehjem (R)	Kelly Schmidt (R)	Josh Gallion (R)	Jon Godfread (R)	Doug Goehring (R)	Ryan; Rauschenberger (R)	Kirsten Baesler (NP/R)	37R, 10D-NPL	79R, 15D-NPL	3R	Kevin Cramer (R)	John Hoeven (R)	Kelly Armstrong (R)	Trump/ Pence (R) ✓
2020	Doug Burgum (R)	Brent Sanford (R)	Alvin Jaeger (R)	Wayne Stenehjem (R)	Kelly Schmidt (R)	Josh Gallion (R)	Jon Godfread (R)	Doug Goehring (R)	Ryan; Rauschenberger (R)	Kirsten Baesler (NP/R)	37R, 10D-NPL	79R, 15D-NPL	3R	Kevin Cramer (R)	John Hoeven (R)	Kelly Armstrong (R)	Trump/ Pence (R) ✗
2021	Doug Burgum (R)	Brent Sanford (R)	Alvin Jaeger (R)	Wayne Stenehjem (R)	Thomas Beadle (R)	Josh Gallion (R)	Jon Godfread (R)	Doug Goehring (R)	Ryan; Rauschenberger (R)	Kirsten Baesler (NP/R)	40R, 7D-NPL	80R, 14D-NPL	3R	Kevin Cramer (R)	John Hoeven (R)	Kelly Armstrong (R)	Trump/ Pence (R) ✗
2022	Doug Burgum (R)	Brent Sanford (R)	Alvin Jaeger (R)	Drew Wrigley (R)	Thomas Beadle (R)	Josh Gallion (R)	Jon Godfread (R)	Doug Goehring (R)	Brian Kroshus (R)	Kirsten Baesler (NP/R)	40R, 7D-NPL	80R, 14D-NPL	3R	Kevin Cramer (R)	John Hoeven (R)	Kelly Armstrong (R)	Trump/ Pence (R) ✗
2023	Doug Burgum (R)	Tammy Miller (R)	Michael Howe (R)	Drew Wrigley (R)	Thomas Beadle (R)	Josh Gallion (R)	Jon Godfread (R)	Doug Goehring (R)	Brian Kroshus (R)	Kirsten Baesler (NP/R)	43R, 4D-NPL	82R, 12D-NPL	3R	Kevin Cramer (R)	John Hoeven (R)	Kelly Armstrong (R)	Trump/ Pence (R) ✗
2024	Doug Burgum (R)	Tammy Miller (R)	Michael Howe (R)	Drew Wrigley (R)	Thomas Beadle (R)	Josh Gallion (R)	Jon Godfread (R)	Doug Goehring (R)	Brian Kroshus (R)	Kirsten Baesler (NP/R)	43R, 4D-NPL	82R, 12D-NPL	3R	Kevin Cramer (R)	John Hoeven (R)	Kelly Armstrong (R)	Trump/ Vance (R) ✓
2025	Kelly Armstrong (R)	Michelle Strinden (R)	Michael Howe (R)	Drew Wrigley (R)	Thomas Beadle (R)	Josh Gallion (R)	Jon Godfread (R)	Doug Goehring (R)	Brian Kroshus (R)	Kirsten Baesler (NP/R)	42R, 5D-NPL	83R, 11D-NPL	3R	Kevin Cramer (R)	John Hoeven (R)	Julie Fedorchak (R)	Trump/ Vance (R) ✓
2026	Kelly Armstrong (R)	Michelle Strinden (R)	Michael Howe (R)	Drew Wrigley (R)	Thomas Beadle (R)	Josh Gallion (R)	Jon Godfread (R)	Doug Goehring (R)	Brian Kroshus (R)	Levi Bachmeier (NP/R)	42R, 5D-NPL	83R, 11D-NPL	3R	Kevin Cramer (R)	John Hoeven (R)	Julie Fedorchak (R)	Trump/ Vance (R) ✓

Key to party colors and abbreviations for members of the U.S. Congress and other politicians or officials
Alaskan Independence (AKIP) Know Nothing (KN) American Labor (AL) Anti-Jacksonian (Anti-J); National Republican (NR) Anti-Administration (AA) Anti-Masonic (Anti-M) Conservative (Con) Covenant (Cov)	Democratic (D) Democratic–Farmer–Labor (DFL) Democratic–NPL (D-NPL) Dixiecrat (Dix), States' Rights (SR) Democratic-Republican (DR) Farmer–Labor (FL) Federalist (F); Pro-Administration (PA)	Free Soil (FS) Fusion (Fus) Greenback (GB) Independence (IPM) Jacksonian (J) Liberal (Lib) Libertarian (L) National Union (NU)	Nonpartisan League (NPL) Nullifier (N) Opposition Northern (O); Opposition Southern (O) Populist (Pop) Progressive (Prog) Prohibition (Proh) Readjuster (Rea)	Republican (R) Silver (Sv) Silver Republican (SvR) Socialist (Soc) Union (U) Unconditional Union (UU) Vermont Progressive (VP) Whig (W)	Independent (I) Nonpartisan (NP)

== See also ==
- Elections in North Dakota
- Politics of North Dakota
- List of political parties in North Dakota
