= Politics of North Dakota =

Overview of the politics of the U.S. state of North Dakota

The politics of North Dakota were shaped historically by early settlement by people from the Northern Tier, who carried their politics west ultimately from New England, upstate New York, and the Upper Midwest. The area and state also received numerous European immigrants and migrants, particularly during the era of opening up of former Native American lands for sale and settlement.

The political leanings of the state since its creation have been largely conservative. However, there has also been a vein of political progressivism within the state's history, particularly with populist efforts to gain better conditions for subsistence farmers. The left-wing Nonpartisan League (NPL) was a strong political force during the first half of the 1900s. In the 1920s many NPL candidates were elected to government offices and the party enacted its largely center-left programs, including establishing state-owned banks, mills, and a railroad. Today, the major political parties in the state include the Republican Party and the North Dakota Democratic-NPL Party, the latter of which was formed by the merger of the NPL and the North Dakota Democratic Party in 1956. The state's Republican Party controlled the state government in its early days. In the early 21st century, Republicans control nearly all of the statewide officials.

The government of the state was modeled on that of the United States federal government, whereby the Governor of North Dakota is executive head of state and head of government. Legislative power is vested in both chambers of the North Dakota Legislature; the House of Representatives and the Senate. Judicial power is vested in the North Dakota Supreme Court, which is independent of the executive and the legislative branches. The North Dakota Constitution was approved in 1889.

== Political history ==
United States presidential election results for North Dakota
Year	Republican		Democratic		Third party(ies)	
Year	No.	%	No.	%	No.	%
1892	17,519	48.50%	0	0.00%	18,599	51.50%
1896	26,335	55.57%	20,686	43.65%	370	0.78%
1900	35,898	62.12%	20,531	35.53%	1,362	2.36%
1904	52,595	75.12%	14,273	20.39%	3,146	4.49%
1908	57,680	61.02%	32,885	34.79%	3,960	4.19%
1912	23,090	26.67%	29,555	34.14%	33,935	39.19%
1916	53,471	46.34%	55,206	47.84%	6,713	5.82%
1920	160,072	77.79%	37,422	18.19%	8,282	4.02%
1924	94,931	47.68%	13,858	6.96%	90,292	45.35%
1928	131,441	54.80%	106,648	44.46%	1,778	0.74%
1932	71,772	28.00%	178,350	69.59%	6,168	2.41%
1936	72,751	26.58%	163,148	59.60%	37,817	13.82%
1940	154,590	55.06%	124,036	44.18%	2,149	0.77%
1944	118,535	53.84%	100,144	45.48%	1,492	0.68%
1948	115,139	52.17%	95,812	43.41%	9,765	4.42%
1952	191,712	70.97%	76,694	28.39%	1,721	0.64%
1956	156,766	61.72%	96,742	38.09%	483	0.19%
1960	154,310	55.42%	123,963	44.52%	158	0.06%
1964	108,207	41.88%	149,784	57.97%	398	0.15%
1968	138,669	55.94%	94,769	38.23%	14,444	5.83%
1972	174,109	62.07%	100,384	35.79%	6,021	2.15%
1976	153,470	51.66%	136,078	45.80%	7,546	2.54%
1980	193,695	64.23%	79,189	26.26%	28,661	9.50%
1984	200,336	64.84%	104,429	33.80%	4,206	1.36%
1988	166,559	56.03%	127,739	42.97%	2,963	1.00%
1992	136,244	44.22%	99,168	32.18%	72,721	23.60%
1996	125,050	46.94%	106,905	40.13%	34,456	12.93%
2000	174,852	60.66%	95,284	33.05%	18,131	6.29%
2004	196,651	62.86%	111,052	35.50%	5,130	1.64%
2008	168,887	53.15%	141,403	44.50%	7,448	2.34%
2012	188,163	58.32%	124,827	38.69%	9,637	2.99%
2016	216,794	62.96%	93,758	27.23%	33,808	9.82%
2020	235,595	65.11%	114,902	31.76%	11,322	3.13%
2024	246,505	66.96%	112,327	30.51%	9,323	2.53%

=== 1889 to 1904 ===
North Dakota began as a Republican Party stronghold upon its foundation in 1889, with John Miller elected as governor. In 1890, however, an insurgency by the Farmers Alliance created an Independent Party to challenge the "McKenzie Gang" that dominated the Republican Party. The state's Democratic Party at the time was very weak, so it fused with the Independent Party and the combination, known as the Democratic-Independent Party, virtually took over the state's government overnight in the 1892 elections. Governor Eli C. D. Shortridge, Lieutenant Governor Elmer D. Wallace, Attorney General William H. Standish, Insurance Commissioner James Cudhie, State Auditor Arthur W. Porter, State Treasurer Knud J. Nomland, and Superintendent of Public Instruction Laura J. Eisenhuth were all part of the D-I party and were all elected in 1892. The only state office not taken over was the Secretary of State, which remained in Republican control. The D-I control was short-lived, however, as all of the mentioned officials were defeated by Republicans in 1894. In 1896, Republican Frank A. Briggs was elected governor, followed by Joseph M. Devine upon Briggs's death in office. Fellow Republican Frederick B. Fancher was elected thereafter.

While the Republican control over the next several years was criticized by Progressives, the state made strides in industrial development. Large lignite mines opened near Beulah and Wilton, and brickworks and flour mills soon opened throughout the state. The railroad industry also boomed in the state during this period, and many cities were formed along the tracks.

=== 1905 to 1919 ===
Despite the progress made by the Republican Party by 1905, political upheaval began to grow once again as Republican progressives united with Democrats to elect John Burke as the state's first Democratic Party governor. While the Democratic Party did not gain control of any other statewide offices, Burke's election began a reform era. During the next decade, a series of other movements began to take place.

In 1907, a new co-operative movement, the American Society of Equity, came to the state and by 1913 become well established. A second movement, the Socialist Party of North Dakota, gained momentum as many of the state's European immigrants by 1905 had come from more radical traditions. Both the cooperative and radical movements criticized the Republican Party and demanded change, seeking better conditions for farmers. These movements created the Nonpartisan League in 1915. This political organization became one of the most significant new movements in the United States.

Led by Arthur C. Townley, the NPL united progressives, reformers, and radicals behind a common platform that called for a massive reformation of the state's government. It resulted in the creation of government institutions to aid residents and to state ownership of banks, mills, and grain elevators. The NPL leaders in the 1916 primary election took control of the Republican Party. The Republican/NPL Party dominated all state government by 1918, and enacted its reformation program beginning in 1919. Its administration, headed by Governor Lynn J. Frazier, reorganized state services, expanded educational services, developed health care and welfare agencies, and improved regulation of public services and corporations.

=== 1920 to 1930 ===
The anti-NPL movement gained strength after the end of World War I. The movement charged that the NPL's leaders, many of whom were former Socialists, had opposed American participation in World War I. The anti-NPL forces coalesced in late 1918 into the Independent Voters Association. The IVA attacked the NPL on many fronts, which rapidly brought disunity within the NPL, splitting apart many of the cooperative and radical groups that had supported the league. Economic distress also became rampant by 1919, caused by the decline in grain prices in the recession that followed World War I. The largely rural state was still highly dependent on agriculture.

In addition a drought in the western part of the state brought stress to families and diminished the NPL support. In 1920, the IVA took control of the North Dakota House of Representatives, and in 1921 it forced a recall election that deposed Governor Frazier, Attorney General William Lemke, and Commissioner of Agriculture and Labor John N. Hagan. The recall effectively ended the NPL's reign, and significantly altered North Dakota government for years to come. The state-owned Bank of North Dakota is a product of the NPL that continues to operate successfully in the 21st century.

During the mid and late 1920s, a struggle between the NPL and the IVA ensued. The state's constitutional offices, including that of the governor, were held by changing parties. The decade ended with a fire that destroyed the State Capitol building, adding to the state's financial burden on the eve of the Great Depression. The IVA gained control again of state politics.

=== 1931 to 1960 ===
During the early 1930s, state Government was dominated by the conservative IVA. By 1932, however, a revitalized NPL returned to the forefront and elected William Langer as governor. While in office, Langer took bold actions, including a massive cut of state spending during the depths of the Great Depression. He was believed to disregard the law. A federal investigation resulted in Langer's being removed from office in late 1934. Lieutenant Governor Ole Olson finished his term.

The state's Democratic Party made a comeback in the 1934 election when Thomas H. Moodie was elected; however, the success for the party was short-lived when it was discovered that Moodie did not meet residency requirements and had to be disqualified. Walter Welford succeeded Moodie, but was defeated in the 1936 election by an exonerated William Langer.

The turbulence in the governor's office ended in 1938, when Democrat John Moses was elected; he held the office for six years. By 1943, seeking a way to overturn the Democratic control, the IVA Republicans coalesced into the Republican Organizing Committee (ROC). They regained the governor's office by 1944, against the national popularity of Democratic candidates led by President Franklin D. Roosevelt. The insurgency left a crippled Democratic Party struggling to re-organize.

As the Republican ROC controlled state politics into the early 1950s, the Democratic Party and the NPL, the state's two liberal parties, merged into the North Dakota Democratic-NPL Party by 1956. The Republican Party and the Democratic-NPL Party became the two main parties in the state, which has continued into the early 21st century.

=== 1961 to present ===
The North Dakota Republican Party and the Democratic-NPL Party have dominated state politics since the 1950s. The Dem-NPL Party made a comeback by 1960, and held the governor's office for 20 years until Republican Allen I. Olson was elected in 1980. The Democrats regained the office again from 1984 to 1992 with George Sinner, but since 1992 Republicans have controlled the office.

While the Democrats made some strides in trying to control the state's constitutional offices, such as attorney general and tax commissioner in the 1980s, in the early 21st century, all of the statewide offices are held by Republicans. The last Democrat to serve was Agriculture Commissioner Roger Johnson, who resigned; he was succeeded by Republican Doug Goehring, appointed by Republican Governor John Hoeven.

Changes in demographics are beginning to influence the elections. A sizeable portion of North Dakota lands are held by federally recognized Native American tribes in reservations. Native Americans have become more active in electoral politics, and most vote with the North Dakota Democratic-NPL Party. In 2016, a record three candidates running for statewide office are Native American: Chase Iron Eyes for US Congress, Ruth Buffalo for Insurance Commissioner, and Marlo Hunte-Beaubrun for the Public Service Commission, the agency that regulates oil pipelines.

In August 2016, a federal court ruled that North Dakota's new voter ID law was too restrictive, reverting the state's voting rules to their 2013 revision for the following election. Under the nullified rules, the state would have disallowed use of federal tribal IDs that did not include street addresses, even though most Native Americans on reservations use post office boxes. The court found the state had created a discriminatory burden on Native American voters.

== Political institutions ==
As in the national government of the United States, power in North Dakota is divided into three main branches: Executive, Legislative, and Judicial.

=== Executive ===
The capital of the state is Bismarck and the current Governor of North Dakota is Kelly Armstrong, a Republican. His first term began on December 15, 2016. The Lieutenant Governor of North Dakota, elected on a joint ticket with the governor, is Tammy Miller. Miller concurrently serves, by virtue of her office as lieutenant governor, as the President of the North Dakota Senate. The offices of governor and lieutenant governor, as well as all of the other executive offices, with the exception of public service commissioner, have four-year terms. The governor is assisted by a State Cabinet consisting of the assembled heads of the various executive departments.

All thirteen statewide executive offices are filled by electoral contests. All but the North Dakota Superintendent of Public Instruction are on a party-affiliated ballot.

==== Current executive branch ====
Main office-holders
Office	Name	Party	Since
Governor of North Dakota	Kelly Armstrong	Republican	December 15, 2024
Lieutenant governor	Michelle Strinden	Republican	December 15, 2024
Secretary of State	Michael Howe	Republican	January 1, 2023
State Auditor	Josh Gallion	Republican	January 1, 2017
Attorney General	Drew Wrigley	Republican	February 8, 2022
State Treasurer	Thomas Beadle	Republican	January 1, 2021
Insurance Commissioner	Jon Godfread	Republican	December 15, 2016
Tax Commissioner	Brian Kroshus	Republican	January 4, 2022
Agriculture Commissioner	Doug Goehring	Republican	April 6, 2009
Superintendent of Public Instruction	Kirsten Baesler	Republican	January 1, 2013
Public Service Commissioners	Sheri Haugen-Hoffart	Republican	January 4, 2022
Public Service Commissioners	Randy Christmann	Republican	January 2013
Public Service Commissioners	Julie Fedorchak	Republican	December 2012

=== Legislative ===
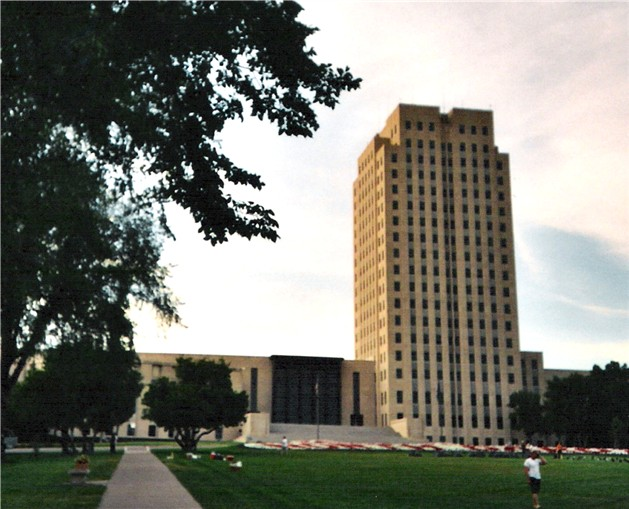
The State Capitol of North Dakota

The North Dakota Legislative Assembly is a bicameral body consisting of the Senate and House of Representatives, with all members elected directly by the people of each district. The House of Representatives has 94 members, each serving a four-year term. The Senate has 47 members, each serving a four-year term. The state does not limit the number of terms that a legislator can serve; Brynhild Haugland notably served for 52 years in the House, a national record that still stands today.

==== Current composition ====
In the 64th Legislative Assembly (2015–2016), the Republicans command large majorities in both the House of Representatives and the Senate.

North Dakota House of Representatives

Affiliation	Members
Republican	82
Democratic-NPL	12
Total	94

The North Dakota Senate

Affiliation	Members
Republican	43
Democratic-NPL	4
Total	47

==== Current leadership ====
The North Dakota House of Representatives

Main office-holders
Office	Name	Party	Since
Speaker of the House	Larry Bellew	Republican	2014
Majority Leader	Al Carlson	Republican	2008
Minority Leader	Josh Boschee	Democratic-NPL	2016

The North Dakota Senate

Main office-holders
Office	Name	Party	Since
President of the Senate	Tammy Miller	Republican	2023
President pro tempore	Donald Schaible	Republican	2023
Majority Leader	David Hogue	Republican	2023
Minority Leader	Kathy Hogan	Democratic-NPL	2022

== Federal representation ==
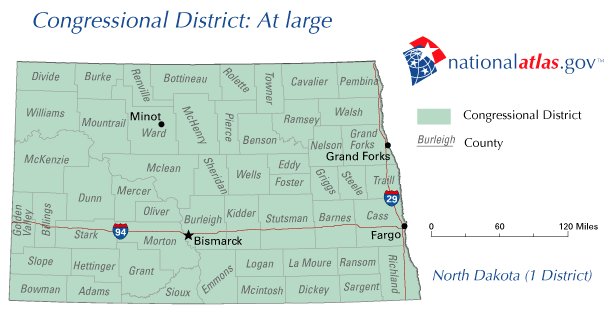
Map of North Dakota showing its at-large congressional district

North Dakota's two U.S. senators are elected at large:

- Senior Senator John Hoeven (Republican)
- Junior Senator Kevin Cramer (Republican)

North Dakota currently has one at-large congressional district. A 2nd and 3rd district were eliminated due to population growth in other states.

U.S. House of Representatives:

- North Dakota's at-large congressional district, previously known as the 1st congressional district with different boundaries, covers the entire state: Rep. Kelly Armstrong (Republican).
- North Dakota's 2nd congressional district existed from 1903 to 1973.
- North Dakota's 3rd congressional district existed from 1913 to 1933.

=== Gallery of North Dakota's congressional delegation ===
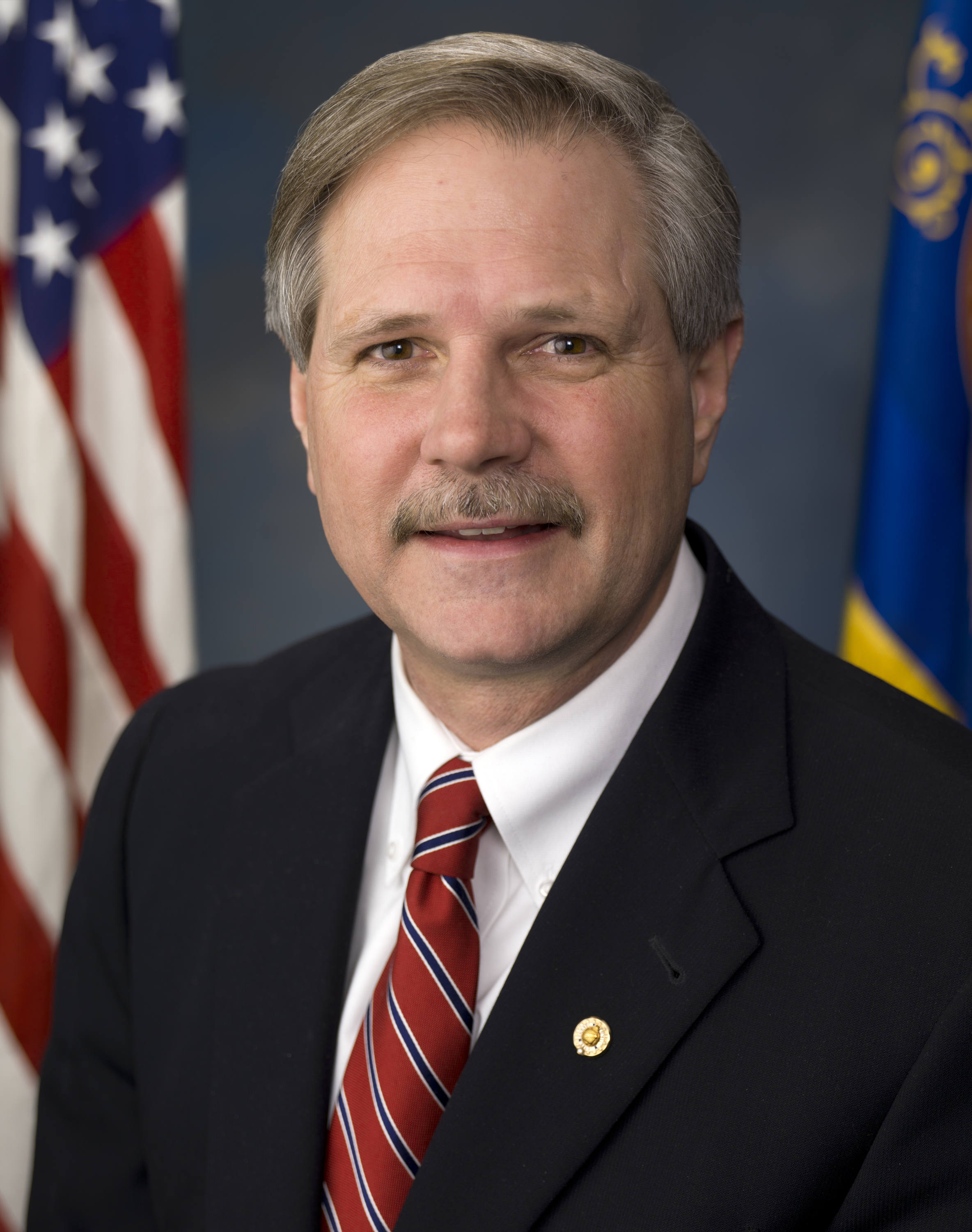
Senior Senator John Hoeven

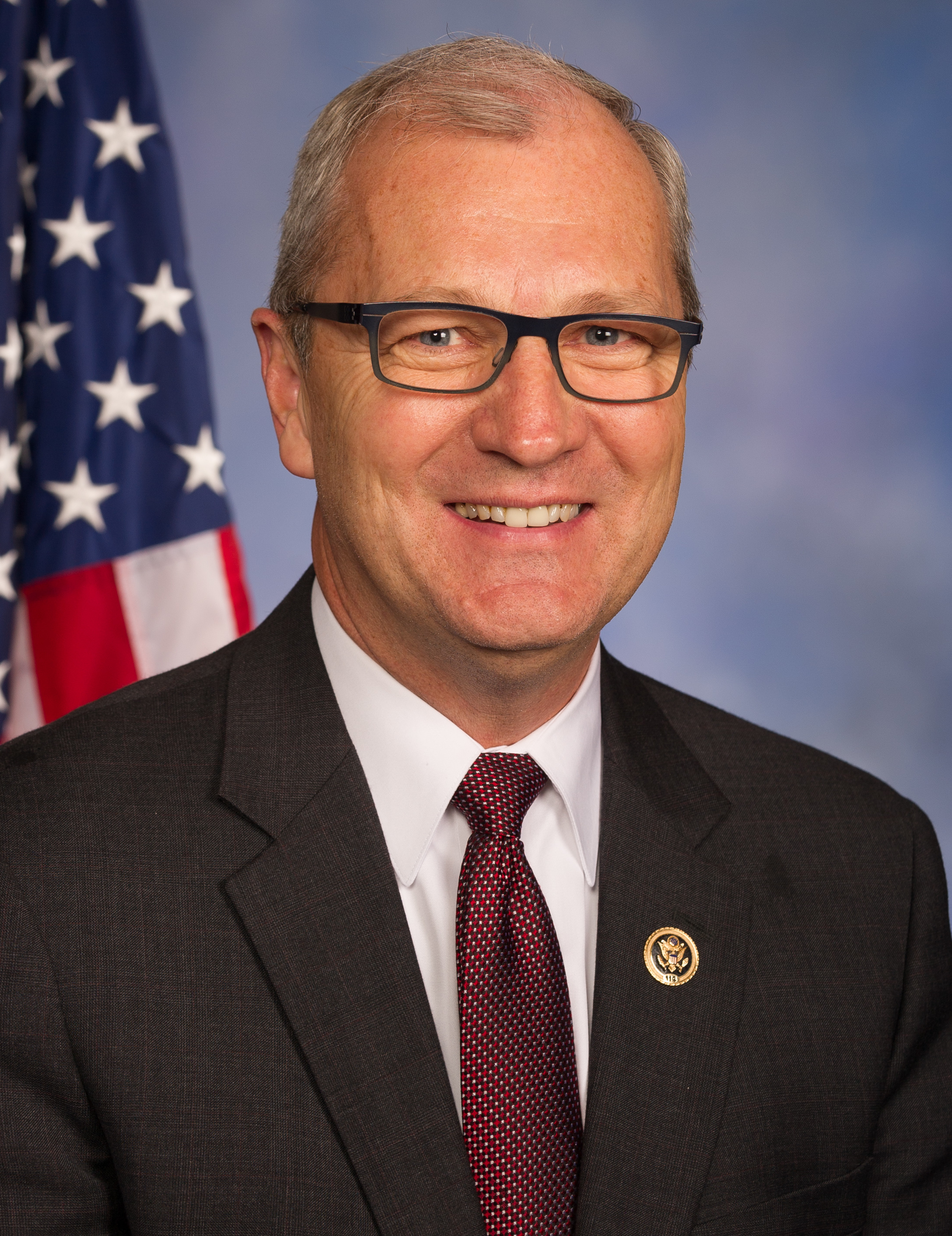
Junior Senator Kevin Cramer

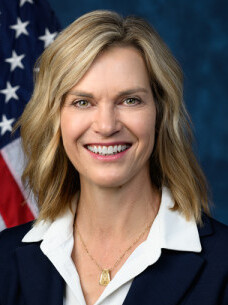
Representative Julie Fedorchak

North Dakota is part of the United States District Court for the District of North Dakota in the federal judiciary. The district's cases are appealed to the St-Louis-based United States Court of Appeals for the Eighth Circuit.

== Third political parties ==
Under state law, there are technically no major or minor parties, only 'organized' parties that are entitled to equal rights under the law .

In the 1990s, the Reform Party and the Natural Law Party both formally organized in the state. However, the national in-fighting in these two parties in 2000 caused their decline. As of 2006, the Constitution Party and the Libertarian Party both have organized state chapters.

The North Dakota Libertarian Party is the most active of the organized third parties in the state. In 2004, Roland Riemers and Mitchell Sanderson were the libertarian candidates for state governor and received 4,193 votes, just over one percent . In 2006, Riemers ran for United States Senate and received a similar result .

It is rare for third parties to nominate candidates for certain offices, especially the state legislative, because State primary rules require a minimum number of primary voters before an organized party's candidate can go onto the general election.

== Ethics Commission ==
North Dakota was one of the last U.S. states to establish an ethics oversight commission; the Legislature voted down proposals to create such a commission in 2011, 2013 and 2015. In 2018, a bipartisan ground of retirees secured a voter-approved amendment to the state Constitution to create the state Ethics Commission, which was given the power to establish and enforce rules applicable to state officials and candidates related to corruption, elections, and lobbying. However, the North Dakota Legislature undermined the commission by restricting its authority and granting it insufficient funds for its activities. From its creation in 2018 through 2024, the commission did not rule any of the 81 complaints it received as substantiated; as of the end of 2024, the Commission dismissed 47 complaints, mostly because it lacked jurisdiction to investigate them, and 30 cases were pending.

== See also ==
- Elections in North Dakota
- Electoral reform in North Dakota
- List of United States representatives from North Dakota
- List of United States senators from North Dakota
- North Dakota Democratic-NPL Party
- North Dakota Republican Party
- North Dakota's congressional delegations
- Political party strength in North Dakota
