= List of agriculture commissioners of North Dakota =

The following is a list of agriculture commissioners of North Dakota since 1966 when the office was established. Prior to 1966, the office was combined with the labor commissioner and was called the commissioner of agriculture and labor. The holders of that office can be found at the list of North Dakota commissioners of agriculture and labor. Commissioners from Dahl to Vogel were officially known as commissioners of agriculture, while commissioners Johnson and those to follow are known as agriculture commissioners. This is due to a change of title that was voted on in 1996. Agriculture commissioners serve four-year terms.

#	Name	Term	Party
1	Arne Dahl	1966–1974	Republican
2	Myron Just	1974–1980	Democratic-NPL
3	H. Kent Jones	1981–1988	Republican
4	Sarah Vogel	1989–1997	Democratic-NPL
5	Roger Johnson	1997–2009	Democratic-NPL
6	Doug Goehring	2009–present	Republican

== See also ==
- North Dakota Agriculture Commissioner
- List of North Dakota commissioners of agriculture and labor.
