= Clare Carlson =

American government employee

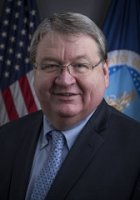
- Carlson as State Director

Member of the North Dakota House of Representatives from the 18 district
- In office 1992–1994 Serving with Eliot Glassheim
- Preceded by: New District
- Succeeded by: Linda Christenson

Personal details
- Party: Republican
- Profession: Politician

Clare Carlson is an American politician from North Dakota who previously served as the North Dakota State Director for the United States Department of Agriculture's Office of Rural Development. Carlson was appointed to the position by President Donald Trump and previously served in the same position under President George W. Bush.

Carlson worked for U.S. Senator Mark Andrews as an Agriculture Legislative Assistant during the drafting and passage of the Food Security Act of 1985. He was later promoted to Andrews's State Agriculture Director. Carlson served on the senior staff of North Dakota Governors Ed Schafer and John Hoeven.

He served as a Republican member of the North Dakota House of Representatives from the 18th district during the 53rd General Assembly. The 18th district included part of Grand Forks. He served alongside Democratic-NPL Representative Eliot Glassheim. He served on the Committee on Industry, Business, and Labor and the Committee on Agriculture. Carlson was succeeded after a single term by Democrat Linda Christenson.

In 2000, he ran for North Dakota Agriculture Commissioner, losing to Democratic incumbent Roger Johnson.

Carlson, a longtime Republican activist, was a delegate to the 2016 Republican National Convention in Cleveland and the 2012 Republican National Convention in Tampa.

Party political offices
Preceded by Dina Butcher	Republican nominee for North Dakota Agriculture Commissioner; 2000	Succeeded by Doug Goehring
