= Myron Just =

American politician

Myron Just (born 1941) is a North Dakota politician and farmer who served as the North Dakota Commissioner of Agriculture from 1974 to 1980, and in the North Dakota Senate from 1971 to 1973. He farmed near Berlin, North Dakota. He currently resides in the Minneapolis/St. Paul area.

Just was a Lieutenant Governor candidate during the 1980 election, but failed to secure the North Dakota Democratic-NPL nomination.

== Notes ==
Party political offices
Preceded by Andrew Headland	Democratic nominee for North Dakota Agriculture Commissioner; 1976	Succeeded by Sebastian F. "Buckshot" Hoffner
Political offices
Preceded by Arne Dahl	Agriculture Commissioner of North Dakota; 1974–1980	Succeeded by H. Kent Jones
