= Sarah Vogel =

American politician (born 1946)

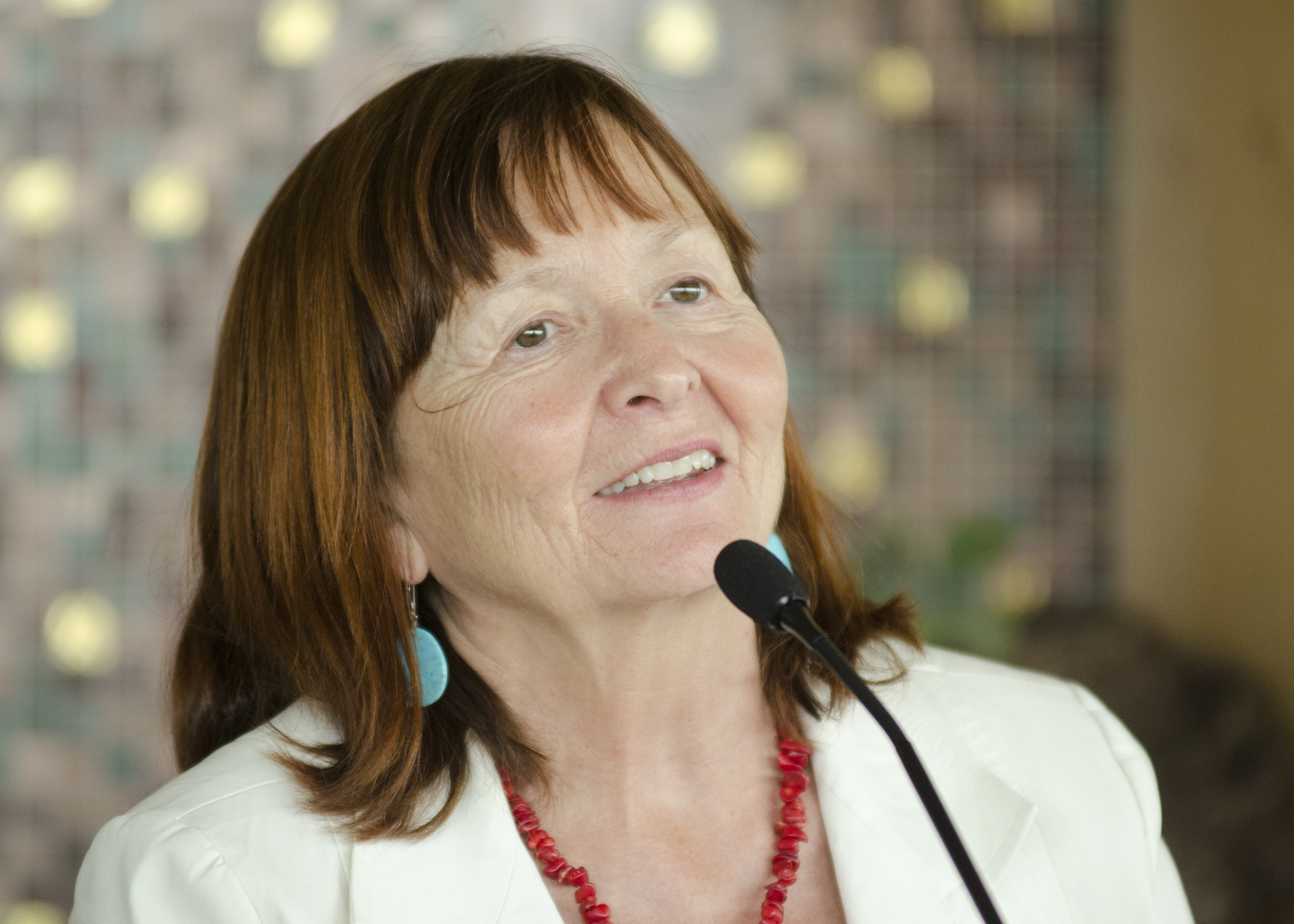
- Vogel speaking at the USDA CNAFR, Washington, DC, August. 15, 2012

4th North Dakota Agriculture Commissioner
- In office 1989–1997
- Governor: George A. Sinner; Ed Schafer
- Preceded by: H. Kent Jones
- Succeeded by: Roger Johnson

Personal details
- Born: 1946 (age 79–80)
- Party: Democratic-NPL
- Education: University of North Dakota; New York University School of Law
- Occupation: Attorney
- Awards: AALA Distinguished Service Award (2006), Public Justice Trial Lawyer of the Year finalist (2011), North Dakota Human Rights Coalition Arc of Justice Award (2017)

Sarah Vogel (born 1946) is a North Dakota farm advocate, author, former politician, and lawyer who served as the North Dakota Commissioner of Agriculture from 1989 to 1997. As a lawyer, she specialized in agricultural law.

== Early life and education ==
Sarah was born in Bismarck, North Dakota in 1946. She is the granddaughter of Frank A. Vogel, chief adviser to William Langer, North Dakota's governor from the Nonpartisan League and U.S. senator. Her father, Robert Vogel, was a former U.S. attorney and member of the North Dakota Supreme Court. Vogel grew up in Mandan, North Dakota, graduating from Mandan High School in 1964. After graduating from University of North Dakota in 1967 with a Bachelor of Arts degree, she attended and graduated from New York University School of Law.

== Career ==
=== Law & Advocacy ===
Prior to her public service career, Sarah Vogel served as special assistant to the Secretary of the Treasury in Washington DC. Returning to her home state of North Dakota, she represented family farmers during the 1980s farm crisis, most significantly as lead attorney in Coleman v. Block, a national class action case filed on behalf of 240,000 farmers, which resulted in an injunction prohibiting USDA from foreclosing on 16,000 farm families. Her work on the case was featured in Life Magazine and later became the basis of the 1984 movie Country, starring Jessica Lange, earning the actress an Academy Award nomination.

After retiring as Agriculture Commissioner, Vogel returned to private practice at Wheeler Wolf Firm and later founded the Sarah Vogel Law Partners in Bismarck, North Dakota, where she practiced law with three other attorneys. Vogel was co-counsel Keepseagle vs. Vilsack, a national class-action lawsuit which resulted in a $680 million settlement for Native American farmers affected by the USDA's discriminatory lending practices. In 2011, Vogel went into solo law practice. Sarah Vogel Law Partners is now known as Braaten Law Office.

=== Public service ===
Vogel became an assistant attorney general in 1985. In 1986, she was named one of 20 young attorneys making a difference in the country by the American Bar Association. In 1988, she was elected North Dakota Commissioner of Agriculture, becoming the first woman in the U.S. to be elected for the position. In 1992 she was re-elected, serving through 1997. In her role as North Dakota Commissioner of Agriculture, she also served on the state's Industrial Commission, Water Commission, and Agricultural Products Utilization Commission. With Senator Kent Conrad, she co-founded Marketplace of Ideas, becoming the nation's largest rural development program conference at the time. Vogel advocated for farmer-owned cooperatives. She was succeeded by Roger Johnson.

In 1996, Vogel ran for a seat on the North Dakota Supreme Court, a bid that was ultimately unsuccessful.

=== Writing ===
Continuing her advocacy for family farmers, in 2016 she co-wrote an op-ed with musician Willie Nelson against North Dakota Measure 1, which would have furthered corporate farming in the state. The measure did not pass.

The Coleman v Block case is the subject of Vogel's first book The Farmer's Lawyer, published by Bloomsbury Publishers in 2021.

== Awards and honors ==
• 2006 American Agricultural Law Association Distinguished Service Award

• 2011 Public Justice Trial Lawyer of the Year Finalist

• 2012 North Dakota Human Rights Coalition Arc of Justice Award

== Bibliography ==
• 1984 “The Law of Hard Times: Debtor and Farmer Relief Actions of the 1933 North Dakota Legislative Session” North Dakota Law Review: Vol. 60

• 1994 “The Effects of NAFTA upon North Dakota State Law” North Dakota Law Review: Vol. 70 : No. 3, Article 1

• 2021 The Farmer's Lawyer: The North Dakota Nine and the Fight to Save the Family Farm(Bloomsbury)

== Notes ==
Party political offices
Preceded by Bruce W. Larson	Democratic nominee for North Dakota Agriculture Commissioner; 1988, 1992	Succeeded by Roger Johnson
Political offices
Preceded by H. Kent Jones	Agriculture Commissioner of North Dakota; 1989–1997	Succeeded by Roger Johnson
