= H. Kent Jones =

American politician (1926–1995)

North Dakota Commissioner of Agriculture
- In office 1981–1988
- Governor: Allen I. Olson; George A. Sinner
- Preceded by: Myron Just
- Succeeded by: Sarah Vogel

Personal details
- Born: April 26, 1926 Webster Township, Ramsey County, North Dakota
- Died: December 17, 1995 (aged 69)
- Party: Republican
- Education: North Dakota State University
- Occupation: Politician, farmer

H. Kent Jones (April 26, 1926 – December 17, 1995) was a North Dakota Republican Party politician who served as the North Dakota Commissioner of Agriculture from 1981 to 1988. He also served as a state legislator in the 42nd through the 46th legislative assemblies.

== Biography ==
Kent Jones was born in Webster Township in Ramsey County, North Dakota in 1926, and he graduated from Devils Lake High School. He obtained a degree in agriculture from North Dakota State University, and became a farmer. He served two terms in the North Dakota House of Representatives, and three in the North Dakota State Senate before being elected as the North Dakota Commissioner of Agriculture in 1980. He was re-elected in 1984, but did not win the Republican nomination to the position in 1988, so he ran as an independent but lost. He married Helen Johnson and they had four children; Jeff, Deborah, Becky, and Sarah. He married Kathleen Hagen in 1988. He died at the age of 69 in 1995.

== Notes ==
Party political offices
Preceded by Robert Nasset	Republican nominee for North Dakota Agriculture Commissioner; 1980, 1984	Succeeded by Keith Bjerke
Political offices
Preceded by Myron Just	Agriculture Commissioner of North Dakota; 1981–1988	Succeeded by Sarah Vogel
