= List of political parties in North Dakota =

The following is a list of political parties in the U.S. State of North Dakota

== Background ==
North Dakota election law does not provide for the existence of any minor political parties, and unlike many other states that allow individual independent nominees to include a minor party designation next to their name on the ballot. A political party is either organized, and thus officially recognized by the Secretary of State's office, with equal rights and responsibilities therein or it does not have any legal existence.

North Dakota's most historically significant minor parties, the Non-Partisan League and the Independent Voters Association could be considered factions of the Republican party, however this is a gross simplification of the situation, as both groups had structures strongly resembling independent political parties, despite competing on the Republican primary ticket.

== Political parties ==
Party		Ideology	U.S. Congress	State Senate	State House	Executive Offices	Public Service Commission
Democratic–Nonpartisan League Party	D-NPL	Progressivism; Modern Liberalism	0 / 3	5 / 47	11 / 94	0 / 10	0 / 3
Republican Party	R	Conservatism; Right wing populism	3 / 3	42 / 47	83 / 94	10 / 10	3 / 3

=== Recognized minor parties ===
Party	Ideology
Libertarian Party	Libertarianism

=== Defunct minor parties ===
- Constitution Party
- Reform Party
- Natural Law Party
- No Labels Party

=== Historical parties ===
Defunct parties who have held a state or federal office.

Party	Years active
Democratic Party	1889-1956
Democratic-Independent	1890-1895
Socialist Party of North Dakota	1902-1918
Nonpartisan League	1917–1959
Independent Voters Association	1921-1944

== See also ==
- Political party strength in North Dakota
