= Frank A. Vogel =

American banker (1888–1951)

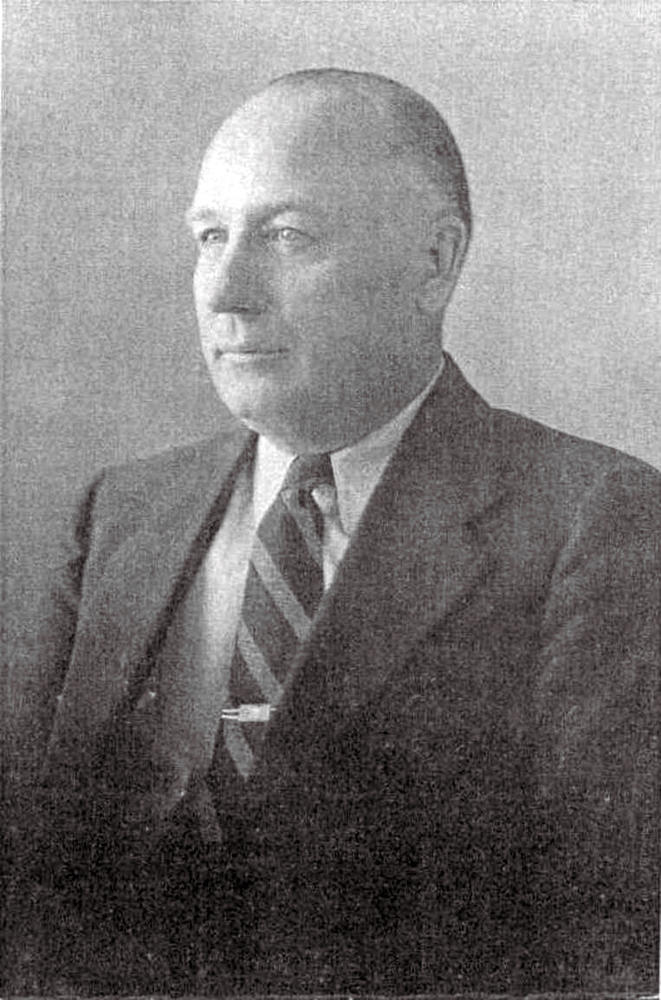
Frank A. Vogel

Frank A. Vogel (1888–1951) was an American banker and the chief political advisor of Governor of North Dakota William Langer. Vogel was born in Minnesota in 1888 to Abraham and Sarah Jane (Taylor) Vogel. He moved to McLean County, North Dakota around 1909, where he was a teacher and school administrator in the small towns of Anamoose, Underwood, and Dazey. He married Louella Larsen and in 1917 purchased the bank in Coleharbor.

== Political career ==
Vogel successfully ran for the North Dakota Legislature in 1921 as a member of the Nonpartisan League. He was re-elected in 1923 and 1925 and, during that last session, was elected floor leader among NPL legislators.

Because of Vogel's strong support among farmers, William Langer made Vogel his chief advisor as he prepared to run for governor. Langer was elected governor in 1932. In January 1933, Vogel was appointed State Tax Commissioner, and on March 15, 1933, he was named State Highway Commissioner.

Langer appreciated Vogel's "liberal political philosophy, his administrative ability, and his judgment." Vogel was not a "yes" man, and frequently challenged Langer's decisions. Shortly after he assumed office, Langer started encouraging all state employees to sell subscriptions to his newspaper, The Leader. Vogel thought it was a "rotten" idea and told Langer, but the governor didn't listen. Because it appeared the money collected was used for personal and political purposes, an investigation was begun in March 1934.

In the spring, a federal grand jury indicted Langer, Vogel, and seven others on charges of soliciting and collecting money from federal employees for political purposes and of conspiring to obstruct the orderly operation of an act of Congress. Langer, Vogel, and three other Langer appointees were found guilty on June 17. Vogel was sentenced to federal prison for 13 months and fined $3,000. He, Langer, and the others appealed their convictions, and after three more trials, Langer and Vogel were cleared of all charges.

Later, Vogel became President of the Bank of North Dakota. During Vogel's eight years as President of the State Bank, total resources climbed from $23 million to $78 million. Perhaps the most lasting legacy left by Vogel was the student loan program he created with his associate, Martin Stenehjem.

== Children ==
One of Vogel's five sons, Robert Vogel, was a U.S. attorney and served as a justice of the North Dakota Supreme Court. Another son, William (Bill) Vogel, was an attorney in Salt Lake City. Another of his sons, Frank Vogel, was killed in action during World War II in the Invasion of Normandy. His granddaughter, Sarah Vogel, became the country's first female State Agriculture Commissioner when she was elected in 1988 in North Dakota. His grandson, Frank E. Vogel, founded the Islamic Legal Studies program at Harvard Law School.

Political offices
Preceded by Iver A. Acker	Tax Commissioner of North Dakota; 1933	Succeeded by J.J. Weeks
