= Math Dahl =

American politician (1884–1976)

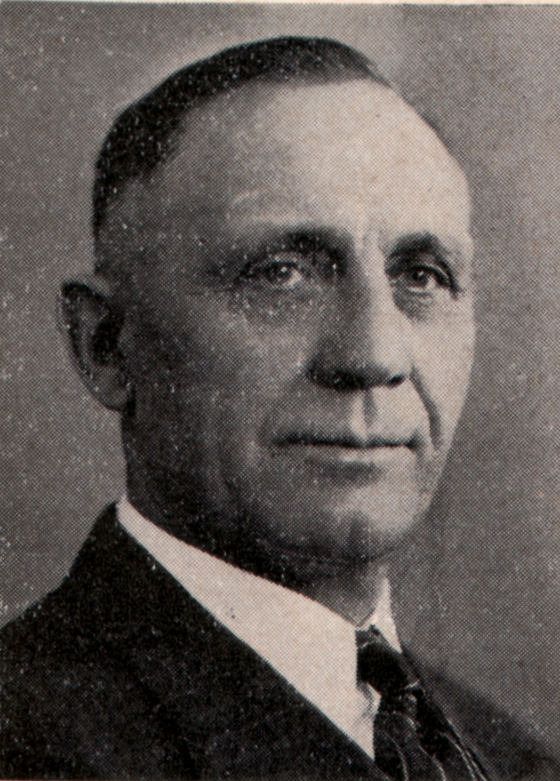

13th North Dakota Commissioner of Agriculture and Labor
- In office January 5, 1939 – January 7, 1965
- Governor: John Moses; Fred G. Aandahl; Norman Brunsdale; John E. Davis; William L. Guy
- Preceded by: John N. Hagan
- Succeeded by: Arne Dahl

25th Speaker of the North Dakota House of Representatives
- In office January 6, 1937 – January 5, 1939
- Preceded by: William Crockett
- Succeeded by: Oscar W. Hagen

Member of the North Dakota House of Representatives from the 26th district
- In office 1931 – January 5, 1939

Personal details
- Born: January 6, 1884 Norway
- Died: August 3, 1976 (aged 92)
- Party: Nonpartisan League; Republican
- Spouse: Ragna Madland (m. 1911)

Mathias Dahl (January 6, 1884 – August 3, 1976) was a North Dakota politician who was well known for his tenure as the North Dakota Commissioner of Agriculture and Labor from 1939 to 1964. His long tenure in the office ended a period of instability in the department when the three previous commissioners only served one two-year term. He re-elected a total of twelve times, and was one of the most prominent Republican/Non-Partisan League (NPL) politicians in the state.

== Biography ==
Mathias Dahl was born on January 6, 1884, in Norway. He came to America in 1902, and homesteaded in Emmons County, North Dakota in 1904. He served in the North Dakota House of Representatives from 1931 to 1937, and was the Speaker of the House in 1937. He was elected as the North Dakota Commissioner of Agriculture and Labor in 1938, and he served until 1965 when he retired. Dahl was one of the most prominent Republican/NPL politicians in the state.

When the NPL dissolved, he joined the North Dakota Republican Party. During his life, Dahl was a member of the Lutheran Church, the Farmers Union, Sons of Norway, and the Masonic Order. He was married to Ragna Madland of Wing, North Dakota. Dahl died at the age of 92 in 1976.

== Notes ==
Preceded by John N. Hagan	North Dakota Commissioner of Agriculture and Labor; 1939–1964	Succeeded by Arne Dahl
