= Roger Johnson (American politician) =

American politician

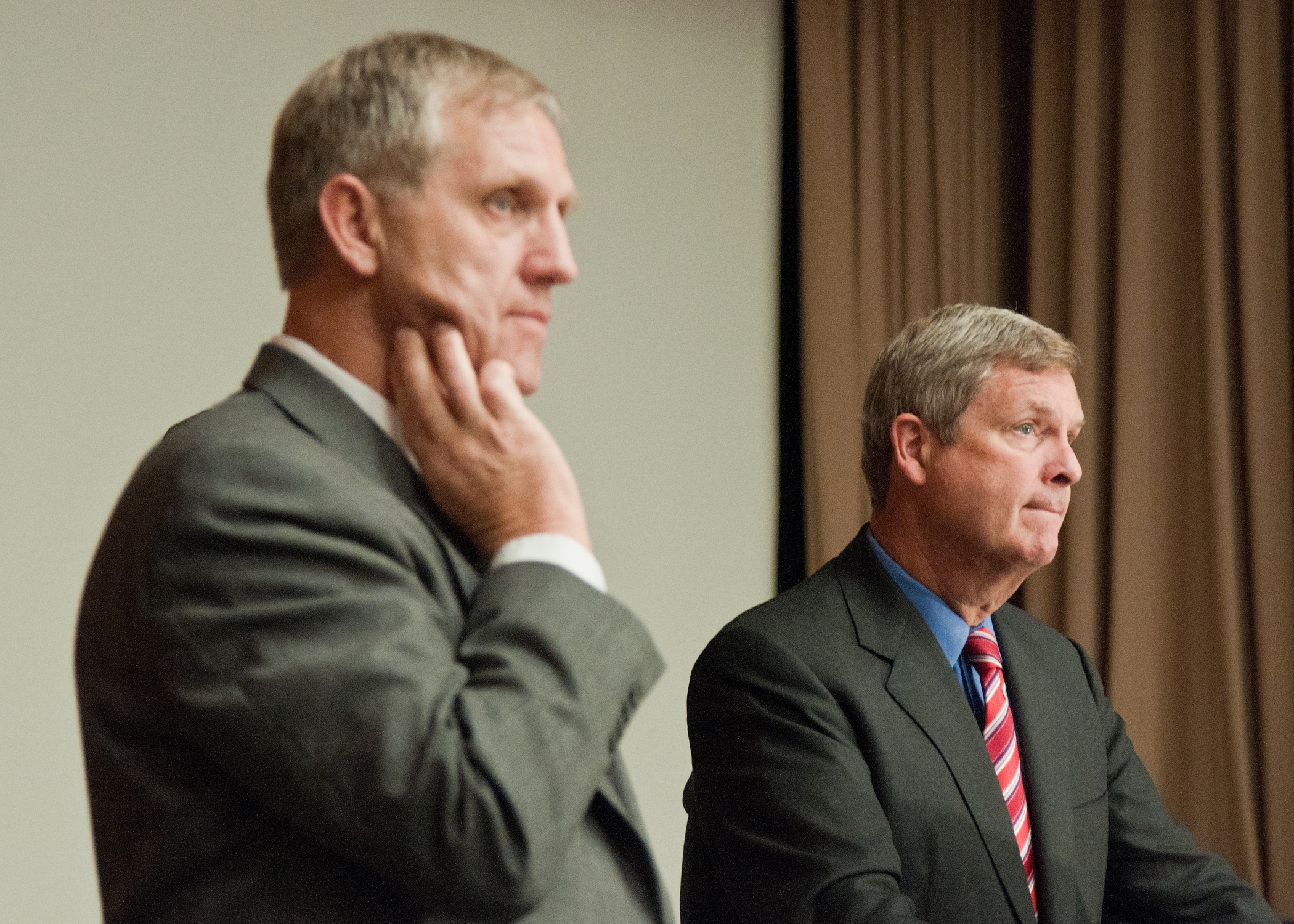
- Johnson (left) in 2011

14th President of the National Farmers Union
- In office 2009–2020
- Preceded by: Tom Buis
- Succeeded by: Rob Larew

5th North Dakota Agriculture Commissioner
- In office 1996 – April 6, 2009
- Governor: Ed Schafer; John Hoeven
- Preceded by: Sarah Vogel
- Succeeded by: Doug Goehring

Personal details
- Party: Democratic

Roger Johnson is past president of the United States National Farmers Union, and the immediate past North Dakota Agriculture Commissioner. He is a member of the North Dakota Democratic-NPL Party. As of 2021, he is the most recent statewide elected Democrat to serve in the North Dakota state government.

== Early life, education, and early career ==
Johnson grew up on a farm in Turtle Lake, North Dakota. He earned a BA from North Dakota State University in 1975 and did graduate work for two years. He then started farming, while working as a farm credit counselor. In 1988 he was asked by Sarah Vogel, the Agriculture Commissioner at the time, to work for her and run the state's Agricultural Mediation Program, which helped farmers resolve financial problems with creditors. He resigned in 1996, when he ran for North Dakota Agriculture Commissioner.

== Political career ==
Johnson was first elected Agriculture Commissioner in 1996 and re-elected in 2000, 2004, and 2006. The election in 1996 was one of the closest in North Dakota history. Johnson earned 129,423 votes, while GOP candidate Dina Butcher earned 129,140 votes. He ran against Clare Carlson in 2000. He ran against GOP candidate Doug Goehring in 2004, winning by a little over 1,800 votes. Goehring did not demand a recount. Johnson faced a rematch against Republican Goehring in the 2006 election, winning by a wider margin than in 2004. He resigned as Agriculture Commissioner in 2009 to become president of the National Farmers Union.

He served as the president of the National Association of State Departments of Agriculture (NASDA) from 2007 to 2008. While president, Johnson helped craft the 2008 Farm Bill.

Party political offices
Preceded by Sarah Vogel	Democratic nominee for North Dakota Agriculture Commissioner; 1996, 2000, 2004, 2006	Succeeded by Merle Boucher
Political offices
Preceded by Sarah Vogel	Agriculture Commissioner of North Dakota; 1997–2009	Succeeded by Doug Goehring
