= Arne Dahl (politician) =

American politician

Member of the North Dakota House of Representatives from the Wells County district
- In office 1958–1964

Personal details
- Born: May 7, 1907 North Dakota, U.S.
- Died: February 5, 1974 (aged 66) North Dakota, U.S.
- Party: Republican

Arne Dahl (May 7, 1907 – February 2, 1974) was a North Dakota Republican Party politician, who was first elected in November 1958, into the State House, as the representative for Wells County (Harvey), North Dakota. He continued to serve in elective offices until his death in 1974, at age 66. His last role was as North Dakota’s Commissioner of Agriculture.

Re-elected into the House in November 1960 and again in 1962, he was recognized by the Republican Party with increasing responsibilities. During his first term, in 1960, he became the Wells County GOP Chairman. In January 1961, at the outset of his second term, House Republicans selected Dahl to be their Caucus Chairman. He was also appointed to several important House committees: Industry and Business; Social Welfare; Rules, and Finance and Taxation. He also became a member and Secretary of the Legislative Research Committee. Dahl continued in some of these roles, such as Caucus Chairman, into his third term.

In 1964, Dahl was named as a North Dakota delegate, to attend that year’s National Republican Convention. On the first ballot at that convention for selecting the Republican presidential candidate, Dahl voted against Goldwater, who ultimately did win the Republican nomination.

The same year, Dahl was endorsed by the GOP to run for the state post of Commissioner of Agriculture and Labor. In that year’s state primaries, his name was listed for that position, unopposed on the Republican side of the ballot.

Winning that election in November 1964, he served as the last North Dakota Commissioner of Agriculture and Labor from 1965 to 1966. After that term, the labor commissioner role was detached to become a separate position. So, Dahl ran for and was elected as the first North Dakota Commissioner of Agriculture, serving from 1966 to 1974. In that capacity, he contributed to many state bodies and committees, including as a member of the State Industrial Commission, which controlled the Bank of North Dakota.

Party political offices
| First | Republican nominee for North Dakota Agriculture Commissioner; 1968 | Succeeded by Robert Nasset |
Political offices
| Preceded by Math Dahl | North Dakota Commissioner of Agriculture and Labor; 1965–1966 | Succeeded by none |
| Preceded by none | Agriculture Commissioner of North Dakota; 1966–1974 | Succeeded by Myron Just |
