= Doug Goehring =

American politician

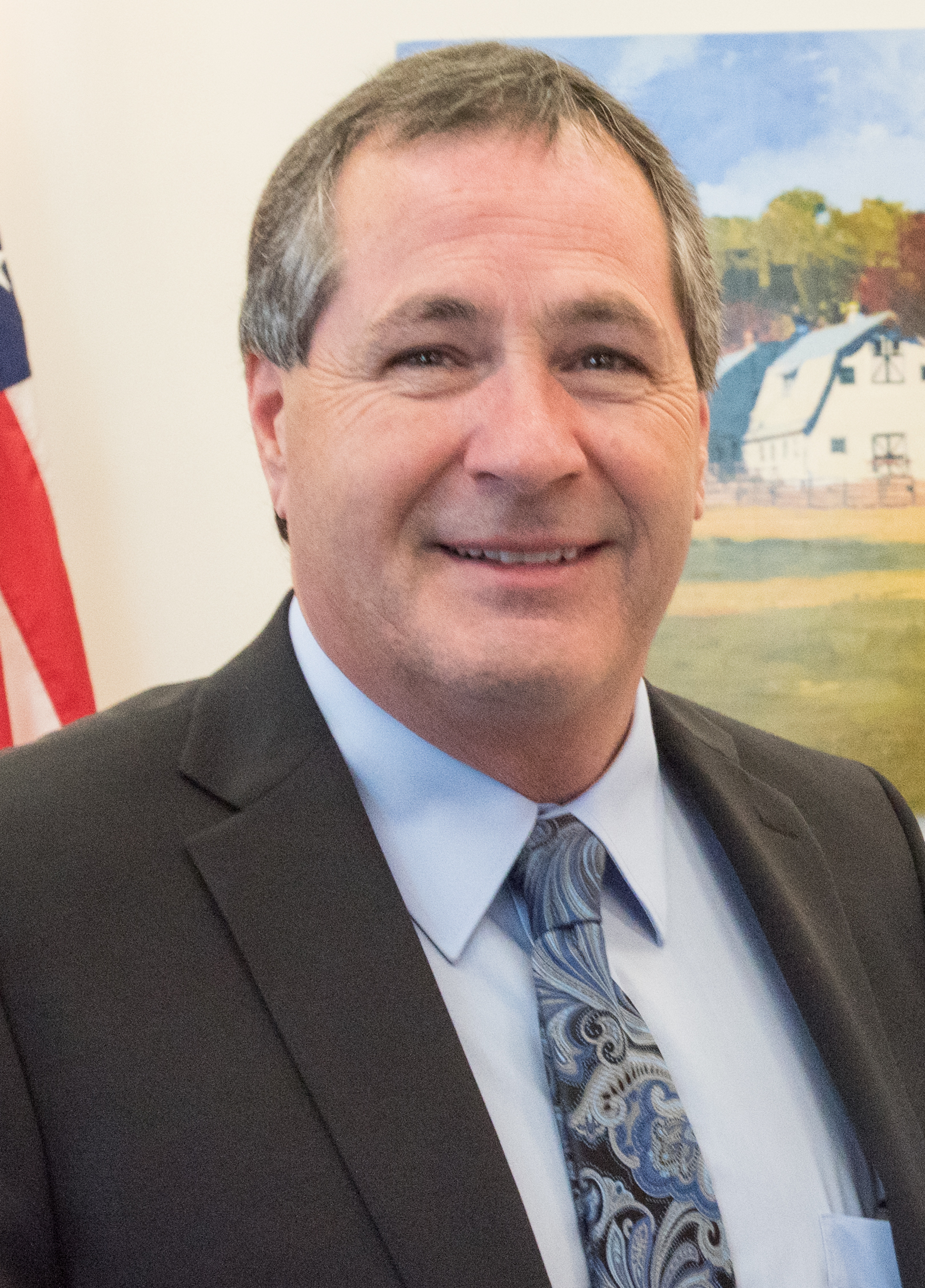
- Goehring in 2017

6th Agriculture Commissioner of North Dakota
- Incumbent
- Assumed office April 6, 2009
- Governor: John Hoeven; Jack Dalrymple; Doug Burgum; Kelly Armstrong
- Preceded by: Roger Johnson

Personal details
- Party: Republican
- Education: Bismarck State College (attended)

Doug Goehring is the current North Dakota Agriculture Commissioner. A Republican, he was appointed to the office by Governor John Hoeven on April 6, 2009, to fill the vacancy created when Democratic-NPL incumbent Roger Johnson resigned to become president of the National Farmers Union.

Goehring had previously challenged Johnson in the 2004 and 2006 elections.

== Electoral history ==
North Dakota Agriculture Commissioner Election, 2004
Party	Candidate	Votes	%
Democratic	Roger Johnson (inc.)	149,900	50.32
Republican	Doug Goehring	148,017	49.68

North Dakota Agriculture Commissioner Election, 2006
Party	Candidate	Votes	%
Democratic	Roger Johnson (inc.)	119,812	55.84
Republican	Doug Goehring	94,736	44.16

North Dakota Agriculture Commissioner Election, 2010
Party	Candidate	Votes	%
Republican	Doug Goehring (inc.)	157,867	67.98
Democratic	Merle Boucher	74,143	31.93
Write-ins	Write-ins	216	0.09

North Dakota Agriculture Commissioner Election, 2014
Party	Candidate	Votes	%
Republican	Doug Goehring (inc.)	139,597	56.96
Democratic	Ryan Taylor	105,094	42.88
Write-ins	Write-ins	377	0.15

Party political offices
Preceded by Clare Carlson	Republican nominee for Agriculture Commissioner of North Dakota; 2004, 2006, 2010, 2014, 2018, 2022, 2026	Most recent
Political offices
Preceded by Roger Johnson	Agriculture Commissioner of North Dakota; 2009–present	Incumbent
