= North Dakota Commissioner of Agriculture and Labor =

The North Dakota commissioner of agriculture and labor was an elected official who headed the North Dakota Department of Agriculture and Labor. The office was established with the state's constitution in 1889, and was split into two separate offices – the commissioner of labor and the commissioner of agriculture – in 1966, when the two departments also split due to a constitutional change that was voted on in 1964.

== History ==
The office was first held by Henry T. Helgesen and the longest tenure in the office was that of Math Dahl, who held the office for 25 years. His son, Arne, was the last to hold the office before it was eliminated in 1966. He then went on to become the first commissioner of agriculture.

== See also ==
- North Dakota Agriculture Commissioner
- North Dakota Labor Commissioner
- List of North Dakota commissioners of agriculture and labor
