= North Dakota Agriculture Commissioner =

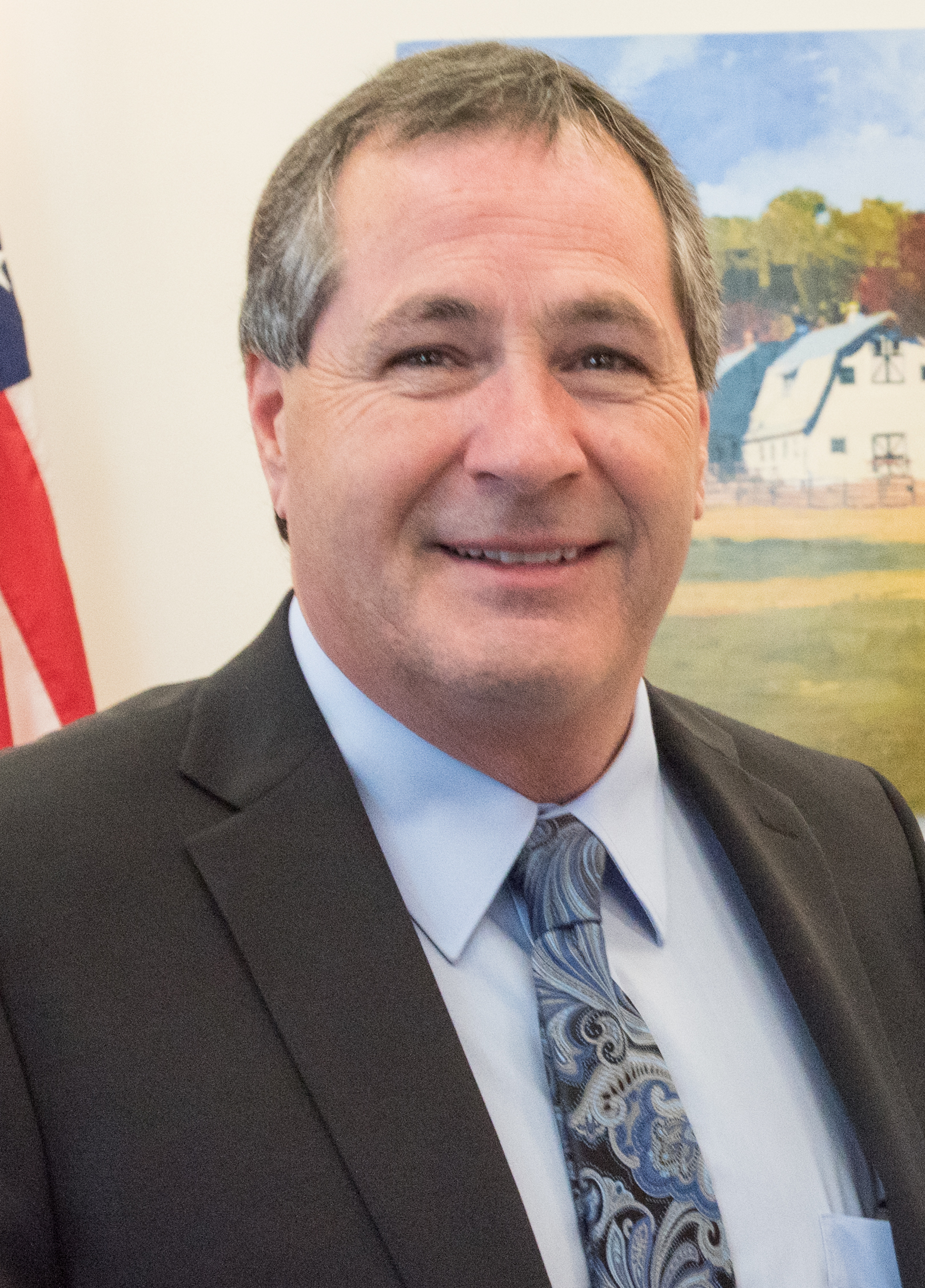
- Incumbent; Doug Goehring since April 6, 2009
- North Dakota Department of Agriculture
- Member of: North Dakota Industrial Commission
- Term length: Four years
- Precursor: North Dakota Commissioner of Agriculture and Labor
- Formation: 1966
- First holder: Arne Dahl
- Website: https://www.nd.gov/ndda/content/doug-goehring

In the U.S. state of North Dakota, the agriculture commissioner, formerly known as the commissioner of agriculture, is an elected official who heads the North Dakota Department of Agriculture. The present commissioner is Doug Goehring, a Republican.

== History ==
Originally, the Department of Agriculture was combined with the North Dakota Department of Labor and was collectively called the North Dakota Department of Agriculture and Labor until 1966 when the two agencies split. The agriculture commissioner's term was then extended from two years to four, and was placed on a party affiliated ballot, while the commissioner of labor was placed on a no party ballot. The title of the office was changed in 1996 from commissioner of agriculture to agriculture commissioner.

== Duties and responsibilities ==
The office is a high-profile position, as agriculture is key to the state economy. The commissioner of agriculture is also a member of the North Dakota Industrial Commission, a three-member panel that oversees North Dakota's state-owned enterprises and also includes the governor and attorney general. The agriculture commissioner also sits alongside the governor and seven other members on the State Water Commission.

== See also ==
- List of agriculture commissioners of North Dakota
- North Dakota Commissioner of Agriculture and Labor
