= 1938 North Dakota gubernatorial election =

- November 8, 1938
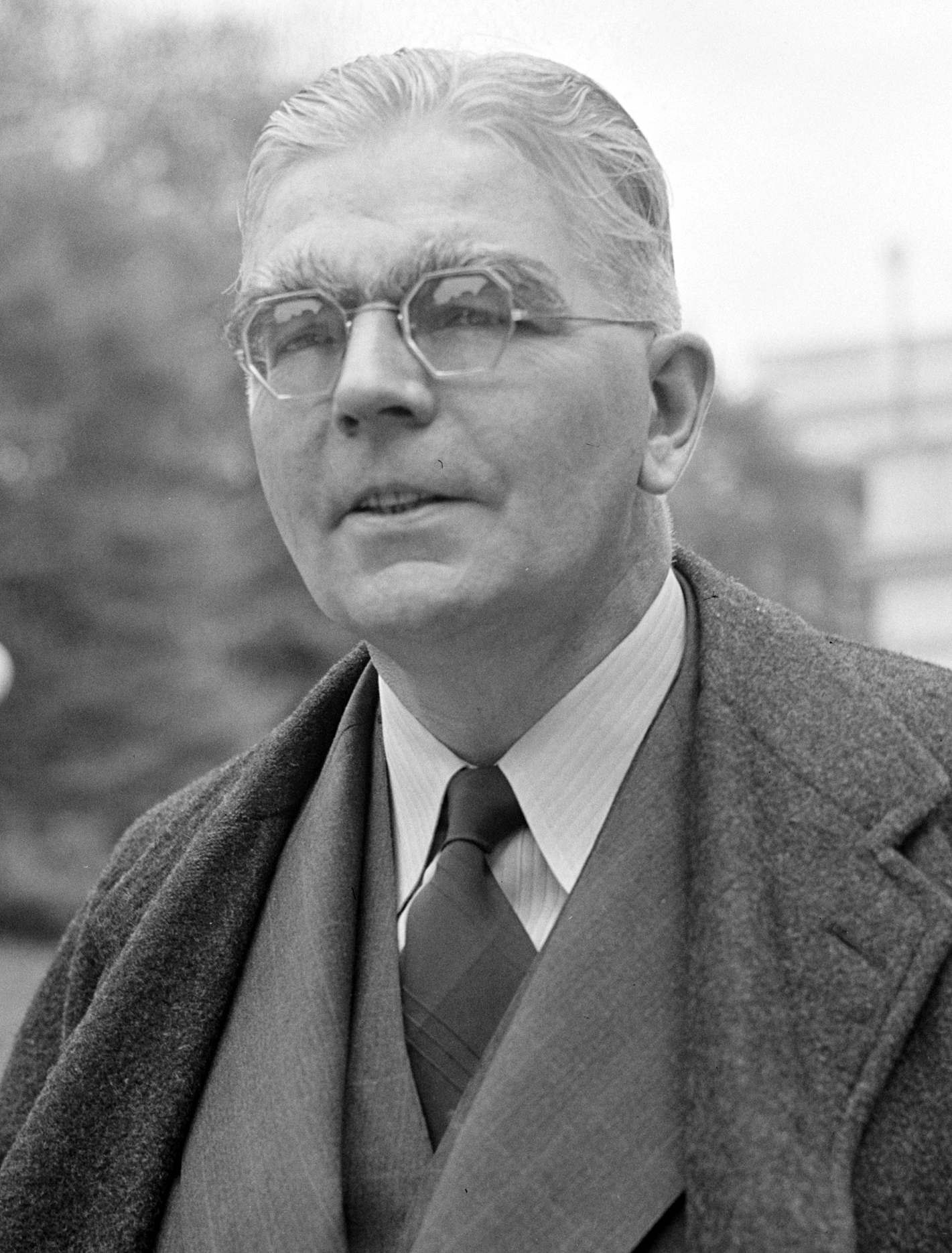

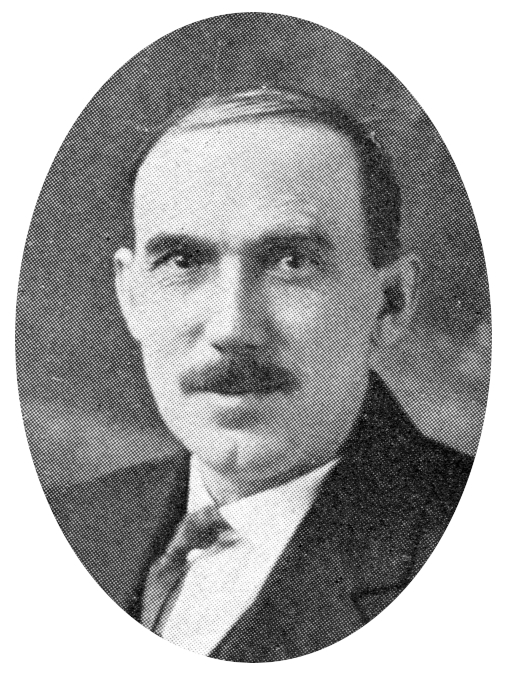
Nominee	John Moses	John N. Hagan
Party	Democratic	Republican
Popular vote	138,270	125,246
Percentage	52.47%	47.53%
- County results Moses: 50–60% 60–70% 70–80% Hagan: 50–60% 60–70%
Governor before election
William Langer
Independent
Elected Governor
John Moses
Democratic

The 1938 North Dakota gubernatorial election was held on November 8, 1938. Incumbent governor William Langer decided to run for United States Senate instead of seeking reelection. Democratic nominee John Moses defeated Republican nominee John N. Hagan with 52.47% of the vote.

== Primary elections ==
Primary elections were held on June 28, 1938.

=== Democratic primary ===
==== Candidates ====
- John Moses, former Mercer County State's Attorney, nominee for governor in 1936
- Oliver Rosenberg

==== Results ====
Democratic primary results
Party	Candidate	Votes	%
Democratic	John Moses	39,090	93.79
Democratic	Oliver Rosenberg	2,590	6.21
Total votes		41,680	100.00

=== Republican primary ===
==== Candidates ====
- John N. Hagan, North Dakota Commissioner of Agriculture and Labor
- Thorstein H. H. Thoresen, incumbent Lieutenant Governor

==== Results ====
Republican primary results
Party	Candidate	Votes	%
Republican	John N. Hagan	90,761	52.39
Republican	Thorstein H. H. Thoresen	82,467	47.61
Total votes		173,228	100.00

== General election ==
=== Candidates ===
- John Moses, Democratic
- John N. Hagan, Republican

=== Results ===
1938 North Dakota gubernatorial election
Party	Candidate	Votes	%	±%
Democratic	John Moses	138,270	52.47	▲23.20
Republican	John N. Hagan	125,246	47.53	▲12.83
Majority		13,024	4.94	▲3.84
Total votes		263,516	100.00	
Democratic gain from Independent				
