= 1934 North Dakota gubernatorial election =

- November 6, 1934
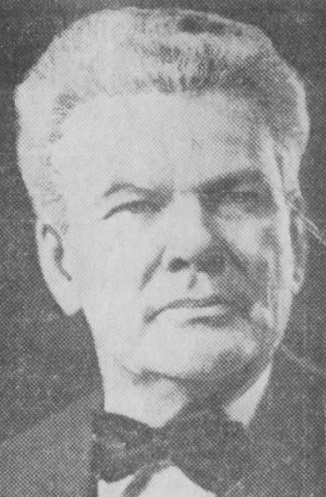

Nominee	Thomas H. Moodie	Lydia Cady Langer
Party	Democratic	Republican
Popular vote	145,433	127,954
Percentage	52.98%	46.61%
- County results Moodie: 50–60% 60–70% 70–80% Langer: 50–60% 60–70%
Governor before election
Ole H. Olson
Republican
Elected Governor
Thomas H. Moodie
Democratic

The 1934 North Dakota gubernatorial election was held on November 6, 1934. Democratic nominee Thomas H. Moodie defeated Republican nominee Lydia Cady Langer with 52.98% of the vote.

== Primary elections ==
Primary elections were held on June 27, 1934.

=== Democratic primary ===
==== Candidates ====
- Thomas H. Moodie, Newspaper editor
- R. A. Johnson

==== Results ====
Democratic primary results
Party	Candidate	Votes	%
Democratic	Thomas H. Moodie	30,796	79.80
Democratic	R. A. Johnson	7,795	20.20
Total votes		26,066	100.00

=== Republican primary ===
==== Candidates ====
- William Langer, former Governor
- Thorstein H. H. Thoresen, former North Dakota Tax Commissioner
- J. P. Cain

==== Results ====
Republican primary results
Party	Candidate	Votes	%
Republican	William Langer	113,027	56.99
Republican	Thorstein H. H. Thoresen	47,380	23.89
Republican	J. P. Cain	37,934	19.13
Total votes		198,341	100.00

== General election ==
Following the June primary, Langer and five others were convicted in federal court on charges of conspiracy to defraud the federal government over certain political donations from state employees. Because of the felony conviction, the North Dakota Supreme Court on July 17, 1934, ordered Langer removed from office and declared Lieutenant Governor Ole H. Olson the legitimate governor. Langer signed a Declaration of Independence of North Dakota, declared martial law in Bismarck, and barricaded himself in the governor's mansion. He eventually relented when his own officers refused to recognize his authority, and Olson served the remainder of Langer's term as governor.

Langer maintained his innocence and claimed he was a victim of a vendetta by his political rival Judge Andrew Miller, and he appealed the decision. However, Langer's conviction also forced him to be replaced on the ballot. His wife Lydia Cady Langer ran in his stead.

=== Candidates ===
Major party candidates

- Thomas H. Moodie, Democratic
- Lydia Cady Langer, Republican

Other candidates

- Pat J. Barrett, Communist

=== Results ===
1934 North Dakota gubernatorial election
Party	Candidate	Votes	%	±%
Democratic	Thomas H. Moodie	145,433	52.98	▲8.01
Republican	Lydia Cady Langer	127,954	46.61	▼8.14
Communist	Pat J. Barrett	1,132	0.41	▲0.13
Majority		17,479	6.37	▼3.41
Total votes		274,519	100.00	
Democratic gain from Republican				

== Aftermath ==
After Moodie's inauguration on January 7, 1935, it was revealed that he had voted in a 1932 municipal election in Minnesota. In order to be eligible for governor, an individual has to have lived in the state for five consecutive years before the election. Twelve days after his inauguration the North Dakota House of Representatives impeached Moodie for unspecified "crime, corrupt conduct, malfeasance and misdemeanours in office", but it was known to be centered upon his eligibility for office. Before the House could appoint impeachment managers or present the articles of impeachment to the State Senate to begin the trial, the State Supreme Court intervened by ruling Governor Moodie was ineligible to serve, and he was removed from office on February 2, 1935. Because of the Court's action the impeachment is considered an incomplete action.

The newly elected Lieutenant Governor Walter Welford succeeded Moodie as governor.
