= John N. Hagan =

American politician

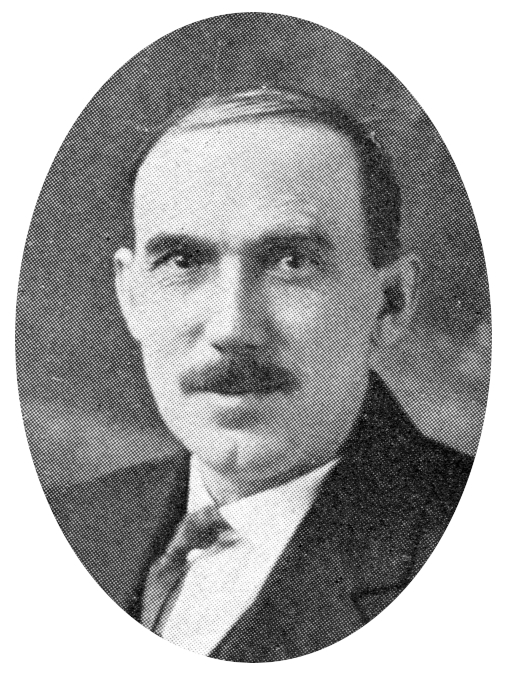

8th and 12th North Dakota Commissioner of Agriculture and Labor
- In office January 6, 1937 – January 5, 1939
- Governor: William Langer
- Preceded by: Theodore Martell
- Succeeded by: Math Dahl
- In office January 3, 1917 – November 23, 1921
- Governor: Lynn Frazier
- Preceded by: Robert F. Flint
- Succeeded by: Joseph A. Kitchen

Personal details
- Born: August 4, 1873 Arcola, Indiana, U.S.
- Died: June 4, 1952 (aged 78) Bismarck, North Dakota, U.S.
- Party: Republican (NPL faction)
- Spouse: Rhea Smith

John N. Hagan (August 4, 1873 – June 4, 1952) was a North Dakota Republican/NPL politician who served as the North Dakota Commissioner of Agriculture and Labor from 1917 to 1921 and from 1937 to 1938. He is one of three politicians in the state ever to be recalled; he was recalled during his first time in the office along with fellow NPL politicians Governor of North Dakota Lynn J. Frazier and North Dakota Attorney General William Lemke in 1921.

== Biography ==
=== Early years ===
John N. Hagan was born on August 4, 1873, near Arcola, Indiana, to parents William and Wilhelmina (Rapp) Hagan. In 1900, he graduated from Valparaiso University. In the fall of 1900, Hagan moved to North Dakota, accepting a job school administration job at St. John. He served in this role until 1903 when he moved to a homestead around Deering, North Dakota. In 1904, he married Rhea Smith. Hagan farmed for several years before getting involved in politics.

=== Commissioner of Agriculture and Labor ===
In 1916, Hagan joined the Nonpartisan League (NPL), becoming one of its earliest members. Also in 1916, Hagan received the endorsement of the NPL for North Dakota Commissioner of Agriculture and Labor. Hagan won the election, and he would be reelected again in 1918 and 1920.

As Commissioner of Agriculture and Labor, and under the state leadership of the NPL, Hagan served on many boards and commissions, including the Industrial Commission and the Board of Administration.

In 1921, a special recall election, initiated by opponents of the NPL (the Independent Voters Association or IVA) successfully removed Hagan from office. He was replaced by Joseph A. Kitchen. The other two members of the Industrial Commission, Governor Lynn Frazier and Attorney General William Lemke, were also removed from office.

Because of infighting, controversies, and the recall election, the NPL and its influence over North Dakota government was weakened. However, the programs of the NPL and some of its prominent leaders remained popular, and the NPL saw a resurgence in the 1930s. Hagan served as Deputy Administrator of the Prohibition Board until 1933. In 1936, Hagan was again endorsed by the NPL and elected Commissioner of Agriculture and Labor, serving one term from 1937 to 1938.

=== Later years ===
In 1938, Hagan received the Republican nomination for governor, but he was defeated by John Moses, the Democratic contender. In 1942, Hagan received the Democratic nomination for Commissioner of Insurance, but he was defeated by Republican incumbent Oscar E. Erickson.

After this, Hagan retired from politics and returned to farming. He died on June 4, 1952.

== See also ==
- List of North Dakota commissioners of agriculture and labor
- 1938 North Dakota gubernatorial election

Party political offices
Preceded by Walter Welford	Republican nominee for Governor of North Dakota; 1938	Succeeded by Jack A. Patterson
Preceded by Ole H. Olson	Democratic nominee for North Dakota Insurance Commissioner; 1942	Succeeded by Ed P. Cosgriff
Political offices
Preceded by Robert F. Flint	North Dakota Commissioner of Agriculture and Labor; 1917–1921	Succeeded by Joseph A. Kitchen
Preceded by Theodore Martell	North Dakota Commissioner of Agriculture and Labor; 1937–1938	Succeeded by Math Dahl
