= 1936 North Dakota gubernatorial election =

- November 3, 1936
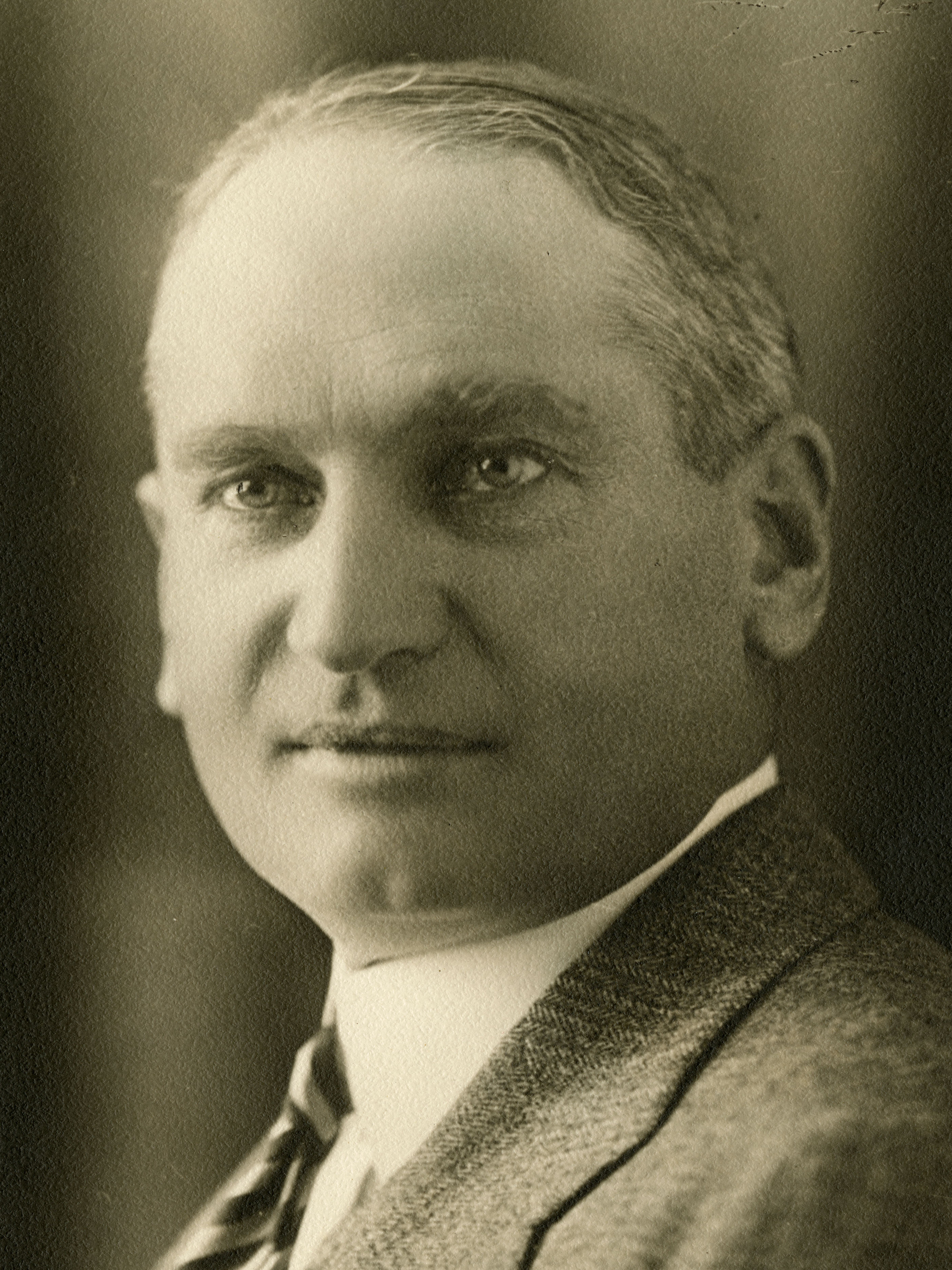

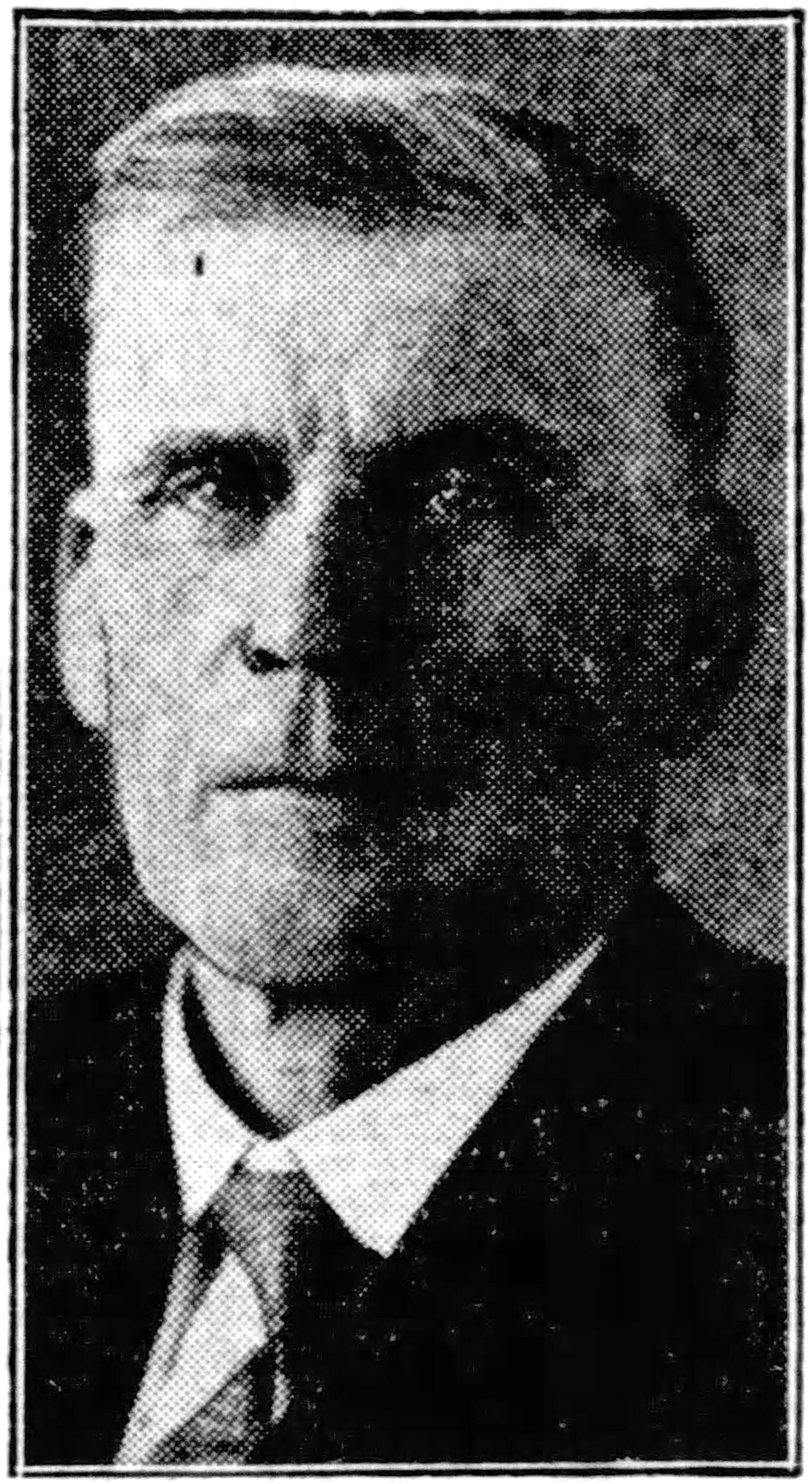

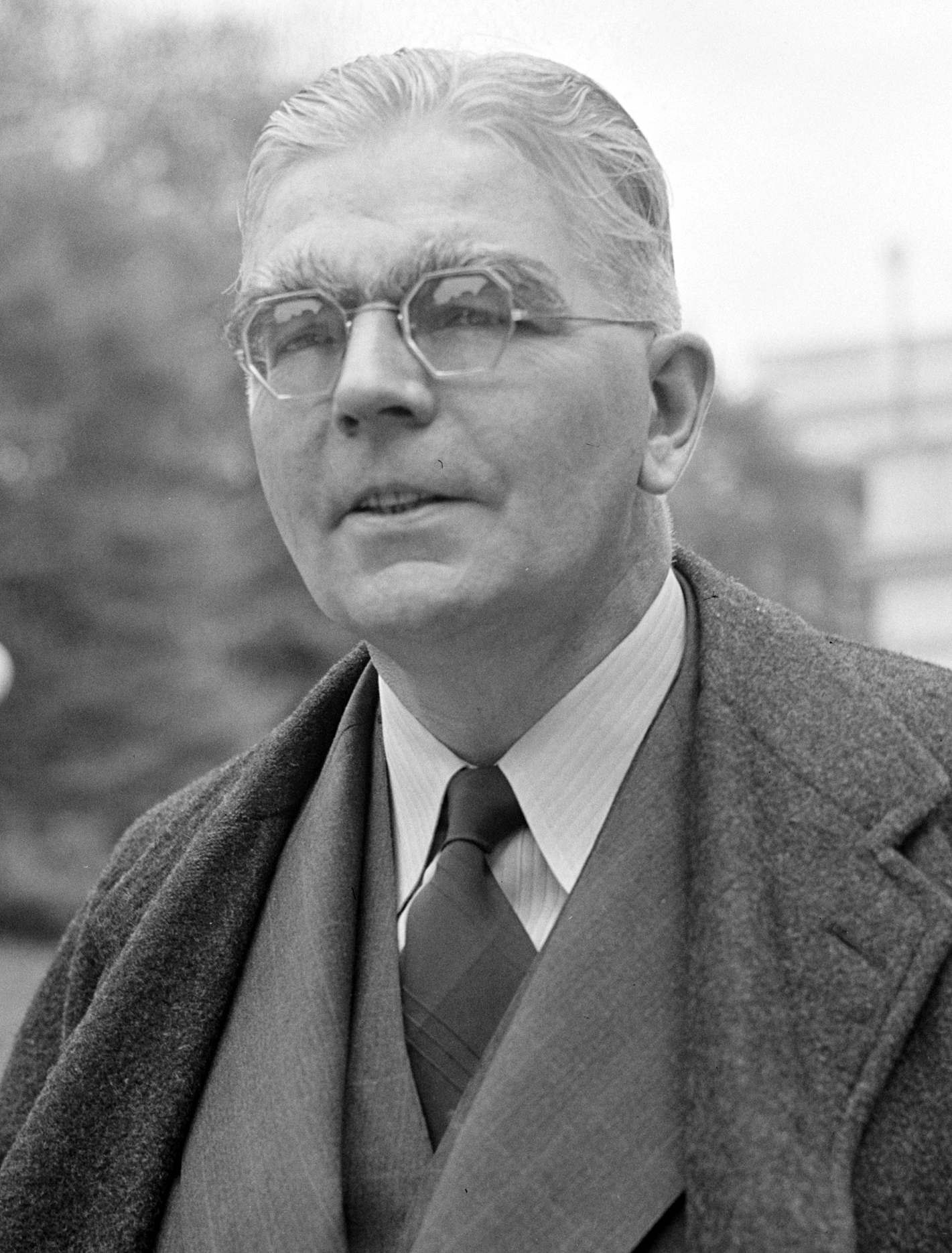
Nominee	William Langer	Walter Welford	John Moses
Party	Independent	Republican	Democratic
Popular vote	98,750	95,697	80,726
Percentage	35.80%	34.70%	29.27%
- County results Langer: 30–40% 40–50% 50–60% 60–70% Welford: 30–40% 40–50% Moses: 30–40%
Governor before election
Walter Welford
Republican
Elected Governor
William Langer
Independent

The 1936 North Dakota gubernatorial election was held on November 3, 1936. Former governor William Langer ran as an independent candidate after narrowly losing the Republican primary. He won a close three-way race with 35.80% of the vote against Republican nominee and incumbent governor Walter Welford and Democratic nominee John Moses.

This marks the first and only time to date that a North Dakota governor has returned to the office in a nonconsecutive election.

== Primary elections ==
Primary elections were held on June 24, 1936.

=== Democratic primary ===
==== Candidates ====
- John Moses, former Mercer County State's Attorney
- Ole H. Olson, former Governor
- James F. Morrow

==== Results ====
Democratic primary results
Party	Candidate	Votes	%
Democratic	John Moses	26,081	63.05
Democratic	Ole H. Olson	12,942	31.29
Democratic	James F. Morrow	2,341	5.66
Total votes		41,364	100.00

=== Republican primary ===
==== Background ====
In 1934, governor William Langer had been removed from office following his conviction in federal court on charges of conspiracy to defraud the federal govenrnment. Langer maintained his innocence and claimed he was a victim of a vendetta by his political rival Judge Andrew Miller, and he appealed the decision. Over the course of 1935, Langer battled his conviction in the courts. After he succeeded in overturning the original conviction, he was retried twice. The first trial resulted in a hung jury after the Judge Miller refused to step down following a recusal motion. Between the second and third trials, Lanier filed charges against Langer for committing perjury in his recusal motion against Miller. This trial, unprecedented on perjury in an affidavit requesting a recusal, resulted in a directed verdict to acquit Langer. The second retrial of the original charges, presided over by a judge other than Miller, resulted in Langer's acquittal.

Following his aquittal Langer ran for the Republican nomination against incumbent governor Walter Welford, who had ascended to the office following the removal of Governor Thomas Moodie following the revelation that he did not meet the residency requirement for the office.

Welford narrowly defeated Langer in the primary.

==== Candidates ====
- Walter Welford, incumbent Governor
- William Langer, former Governor

==== Results ====
Republican primary results
Party	Candidate	Votes	%
Republican	Walter Welford (inc.)	90,788	50.19
Republican	William Langer	90,093	49.81
Total votes		180,881	100.00

== General election ==
Following his defeat in the Republican primary, Langer refused to drop out of the race and ran for the office as an independent.

=== Candidates ===
Major party candidates

- William Langer, Independent
- Walter Welford, Republican
- John Moses, Democratic

Other candidates

- Pat J. Barrett, Communist
- L. J. Wehe, Progressive

=== Results ===
1936 North Dakota gubernatorial election
Party	Candidate	Votes	%	±%
Independent	William Langer	98,750	35.80	N/A
Republican	Walter Welford (inc.)	95,697	34.70	▼11.91
Democratic	John Moses	80,726	29.27	▼23.71
Communist	Pat J. Barrett	331	0.12	▼0.29
Progressive Party	L. J. Wehe	309	0.11	N/A
Majority		3,053	1.10	▼5.27
Total votes		275,813	100.0	
Independent gain from Republican				
