= John F. Cowan =

North Dakota lawyer and politician

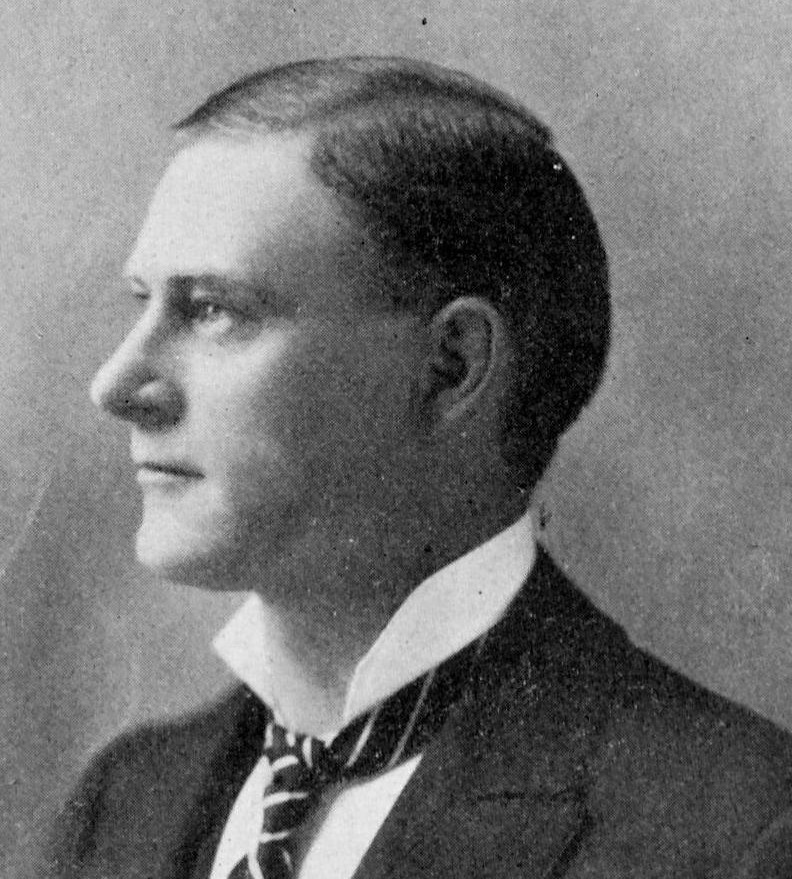

4th Attorney General of North Dakota
- In office 1895–1900
- Governor: Roger Allin; Frank A. Briggs; Joseph M. Devine; Frederick B. Fancher
- Preceded by: William H. Standish
- Succeeded by: Oliver D. Comstock

Personal details
- Born: John Francis Cowan; December 29, 1858 Moffat, Dumfriesshire, Scotland
- Died: November 25, 1917 (aged 58) Rochester, Minnesota, United States
- Political party: Republican
- Spouse: Mary Flynn
- Education: Ottawa Normal School; College of Physicians and Surgeons of Ontario

John Francis Cowan (December 29, 1858 – November 25, 1917) was a prominent North Dakota lawyer, politician, Attorney General, and judge. While serving as the Judge of the Second Judicial District of North Dakota, Cowan became the first person in state history to face impeachment charges.

== Early life ==
John F. Cowan was born on December 29, 1858, in Moffat, Scotland. In 1862, he immigrated to Canada West, with his family. Cowan graduated from the Ottawa Normal School, and then studied medicine at the College of Physicians and Surgeons of Ontario.

He immigrated to the United States in 1880, settling in Port Huron, Michigan. There, he worked as a clerk for the Chicago & Grand Trunk Railroad Company. In 1881, he came to North Dakota (Dakota Territory at the time) and settled in Nelson County. Cowan later moved to Devils Lake, and he later worked at the law office of John McGee.

== Career ==
In 1884, Cowan was elected justice of the peace in Devils Lake. In 1885, he was admitted to practice law before the Territorial District Court and opened his own law office. Cowan later formed the Cowan & McClory firm with P. J. McClory. In 1886, Cowan was elected to the office of superintendent of schools for Ramsey County and was reelected in 1888. In 1890, Cowan was elected as State’s Attorney of Ramsey County, and served in that role until 1894.

=== Attorney General ===
In 1894, John Cowan was elected Attorney General of North Dakota, after becoming the Republican candidate. Cowan campaigned throughout the state and gained a reputation as a notable orator. Cowan served as North Dakota's Attorney General until 1900, when he decided not to seek reelection again.

=== District Judge ===
After stepping down as North Dakota's Attorney General, Cowan returned to Devils Lake. In 1901, he was elected Judge of the Second Judicial District. He served in this role until 1912. In 1911, during his time as a district judge, Cowan became the first person in state history to face impeachment charges.

== Impeachment ==
For the first time in state history, in 1911, the North Dakota House of Representatives filed articles of impeachment against Cowan and forwarded them to the Senate.

The allegations against Judge Cowan included things like habitual drunkenness, frequenting establishments where intoxicating liquors were sold (North Dakota was a "dry state" at the time), engaging in disorderly and boisterous conduct, speaking lewd and obscene words, assaulting a woman by attempting to forcibly kiss her, dismissing or ignoring motions and cases, deceiving the auditor, influencing jurors, intimidating attorneys, and sleeping during trials.

At the end of March 1911, the Senate reconvened for the trial. As lieutenant governor, Usher L. Burdick presided over the trial. One of the members of the House on the prosecution team was future governor R. A. Nestos.

On May 4, 1911, after a month of hearings, the Senate found Cowan not guilty on all charges.

== Death ==
The impeachment trial hurt Cowan personally, politically, and physically. In 1912, he lost his district judge reelection campaign to C.W. Buttz, and he returned to his Devils Lake law practice. In the following years, his health began to fail. At the age of 58, he died in Rochester, Minnesota on November 25, 1917.

John F. Cowan is buried in Saint Joseph's Catholic Cemetery in Devils Lake.

== Personal life ==
In 1885, Cowan married Mary Flynn of Henderson, Minnesota.

== Political offices ==
- Devils Lake Justice of the Peace
- Superintendent of Schools for Ramsey County
- State's Attorney for Ramsey County
- Attorney General of North Dakota
- Judge of the Second Judicial District of North Dakota

== See also ==
- List of attorneys general of North Dakota
- North Dakota Attorney General
