= Peter O. Sathre =

American judge

Peter Olai Sathre (February 7, 1876 – January 23, 1968) was an American attorney and politician who served as the North Dakota Attorney General and as a justice of the North Dakota Supreme Court.

== Early life and education ==
Peter Olai Sathre was born in Adams Township, Mower County, Minnesota. He was the son of Jacob P. and Malene (Valemar) Sathre. He moved to Dakota Territory with his parents in 1884. He received his law degree from the University of North Dakota in 1910.

== Career ==
He practiced law in Finley, North Dakota, from 1910 to 1932. He was appointed Assistant United States Attorney in 1932. In 1933, he accepted an appointment to be the Assistant Attorney General for North Dakota. He subsequently was appointed Attorney General and was later elected as North Dakota Attorney General in 1934 and 1936. He resigned 1937 to accept an appointment to the North Dakota Supreme Court. He left the court in 1938.

Party political offices
Preceded by Arthur J. Gronna	Republican nominee for North Dakota Attorney General; 1934, 1936	Succeeded by Alvin C. Strutz
Legal offices
Preceded by Arthur J. Gronna	Attorney General of North Dakota; 1933–1937	Succeeded by Alvin C. Strutz
Preceded by Nels G. Johnson	Attorney General of North Dakota; 1948–1948	Succeeded by Elmo T. Christianson
