= Henry Linde =

American attorney and politician

Henry J. Linde (December 31, 1879 – 1917) was an American attorney who served as the 9th North Dakota Attorney General for one term from 1915 to 1916.

Linde was born near Ridgeway in Winneshiek County, Iowa. He was educated at Luther College in Decorah, Iowa, where he graduated in the spring of 1901. He studied at the University of Minnesota Law School and graduated in the spring of 1906.

He was a teacher in science and English literature at Park Region Luther College in Fergus Falls, Minnesota. He came to Plaza, North Dakota in July 1906 and engaged in the practice of law. He later moved to Stanley, North Dakota, when Mountrail County, North Dakota was organized. He was elected to the North Dakota House of Representatives in 1908 and to the North Dakota Senate in 1910 as a Republican. He was elected the state's attorney general in 1914.

== Bibliography ==
- North Dakota Secretary of State. "North Dakota Blue Book" (1911), pp. 531.

Legal offices
Preceded by Andrew Miller	Attorney General of North Dakota; 1915–1916	Succeeded by William Langer
