= Arthur J. Gronna =

American politician (1897–1965)

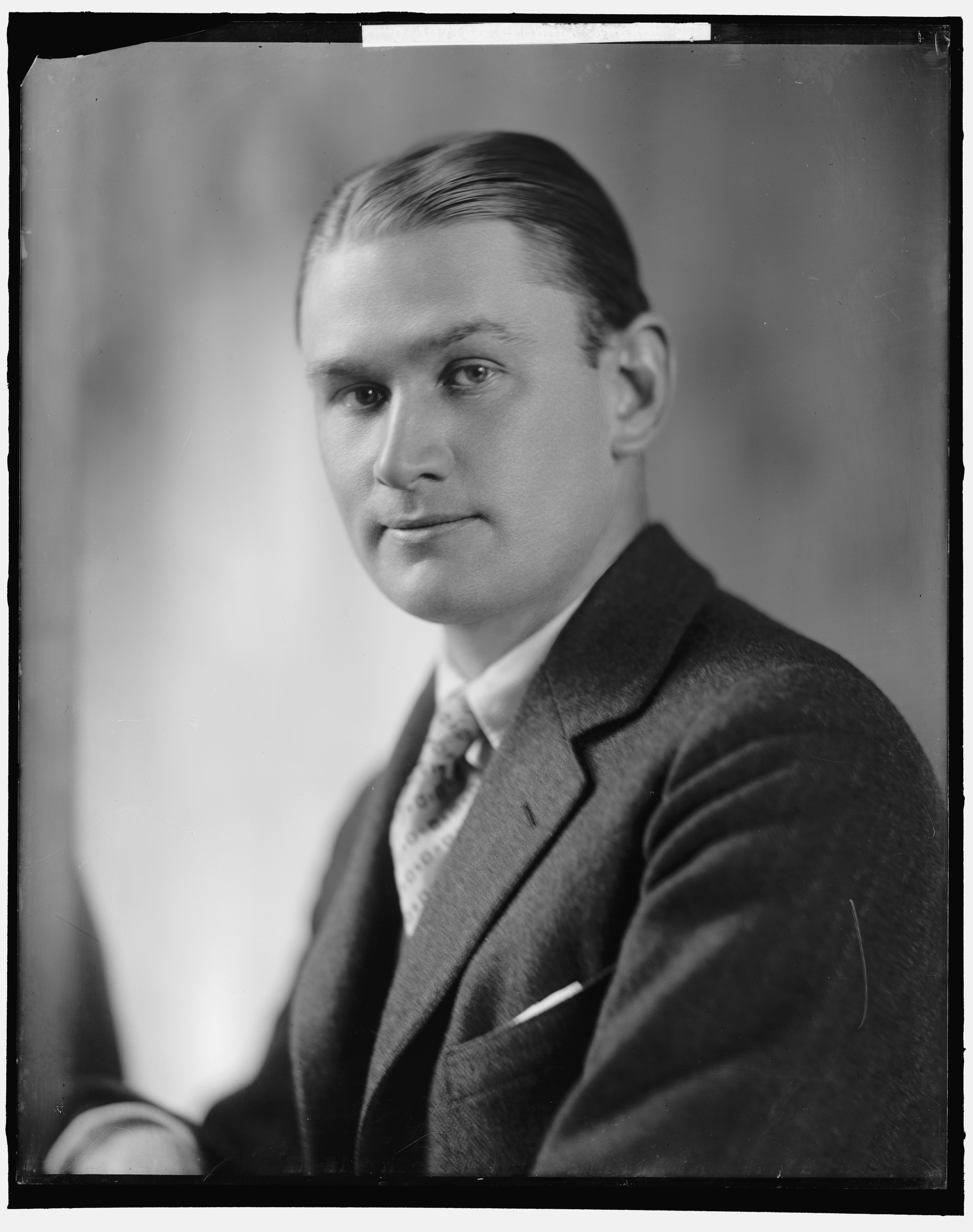
- Arthur J. Gronna

15th North Dakota Attorney General
- In office 1932–1933
- Governor: William Langer
- Preceded by: James Morris
- Succeeded by: Peter O. Sathre

Personal details
- Born: Arthur Jackson Gronna; July 19, 1897 Lakota, North Dakota, US
- Died: January 19, 1965 (aged 67)
- Party: Republican
- Education: George Washington University (BA); Harvard Law School (LLB)

Arthur J. Gronna (July 19, 1897 – January 19, 1965) was an American politician who served as the North Dakota Attorney General from 1932 to 1933. His father Asle Gronna served in the United States Senate and United States House of Representatives, while his brother, James D. Gronna, was the North Dakota Secretary of State.
