= List of attorneys general of North Dakota =

The following is a list of attorneys general of North Dakota. Attorneys general previously were elected to a two year-term, which was extended to four in 1964.

Attorneys general by party affiliation
Party	Attorneys general
Republican	26
Republican	21
Republican/NPL	5
Democratic	3
Democratic-NPL	2
Democratic-Independent	1

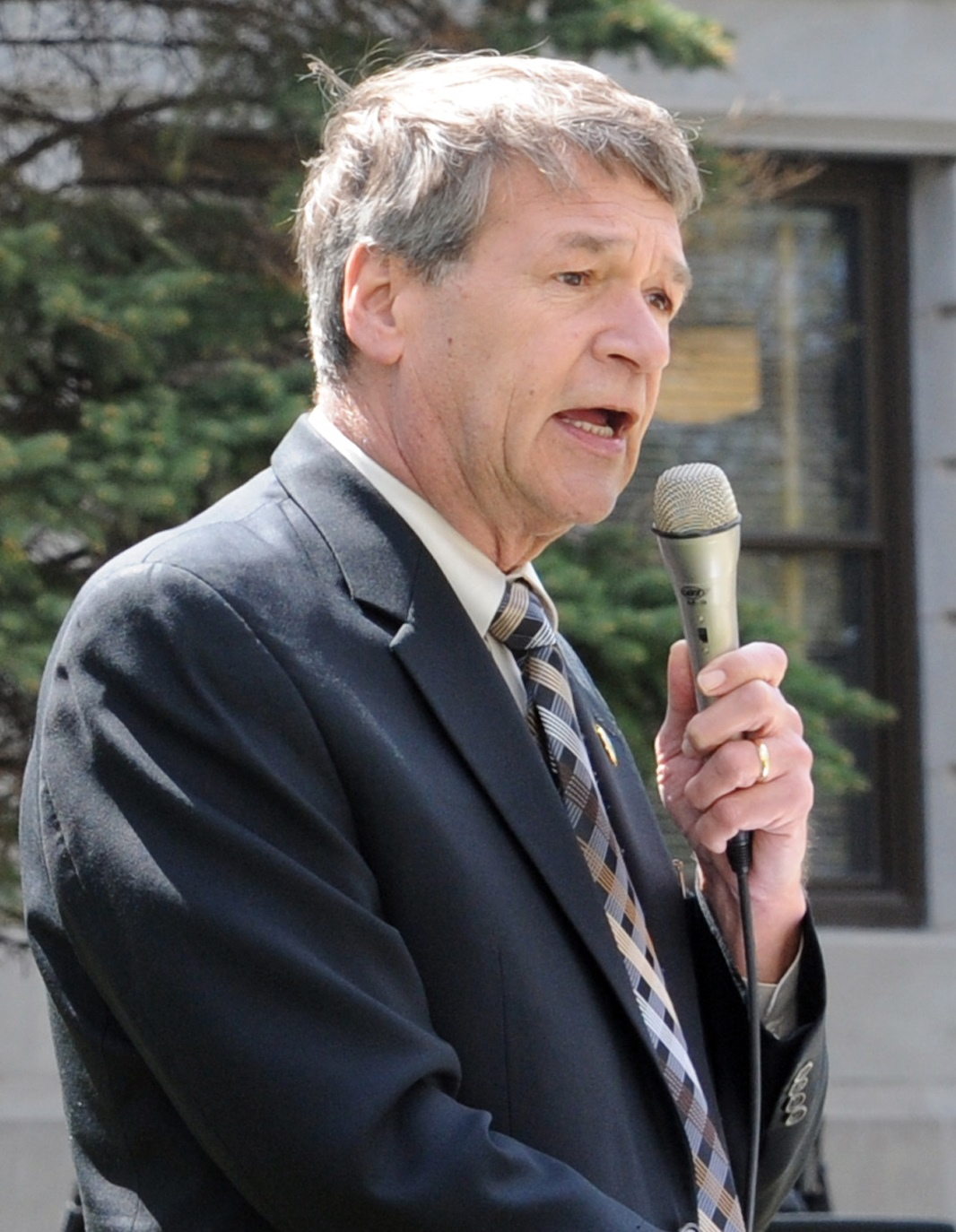
North Dakota's longest-tenured Attorney General Wayne Stenehjem served from 2001 until his death in January 2022

#	Image	Name	Term	Party
1		George F. Goodwin	1889–1890	Republican
2		Charles A. M. Spencer	1891–1892	Republican
3		William H. Standish	1893–1894	Democratic-Independent
4		John F. Cowan	1895–1900	Republican
5		Oliver D. Comstock	1901–1902	Republican
6		Carl N. Frich	1903–1906	Republican
7		Thomas F. McCue	1907–1908	Republican
8		Andrew Miller	1909–1914	Republican
9		Henry Linde	1915–1916	Republican
10		William Langer	1917–1920	Republican/NPL
11		William Lemke	1921	Republican/NPL
12		Sveinbjorn Johnson	1921–1922	Republican/IVA
13		George F. Shafer	1923–1928	Republican/IVA
14		James Morris	1929–1932	Republican
15		Arthur J. Gronna	1933–1933	Republican/NPL
16		Peter O. Sathre	1933–1937	Republican/NPL
17		Alvin C. Strutz	1937–1944	Republican/NPL
18		Nels G. Johnson	1945–1948	Republican
19		Peter O. Sathre	1948–1948	Republican
20		Wallace E. Warner	1949–1950	Republican
21		Elmo T. Christianson	1951–1954	Republican
22		Paul Benson	1954–1954	Republican
23		Leslie R. Burgum	1955–1962	Republican
24		Helgi Johanneson	1963–1972	Republican
25		Allen I. Olson	1973–1980	Republican
26		Robert Wefald	1981–1984	Republican
27		Nicholas Spaeth	1985–1992	Democratic-NPL
28		Heidi Heitkamp	1993–2000	Democratic-NPL
29		Wayne Stenehjem	2001–2022	Republican
30		Drew Wrigley	2022–present	Republican

== See also ==
- North Dakota Attorney General
