= 1952 United States Senate election in North Dakota =

- November 4, 1952
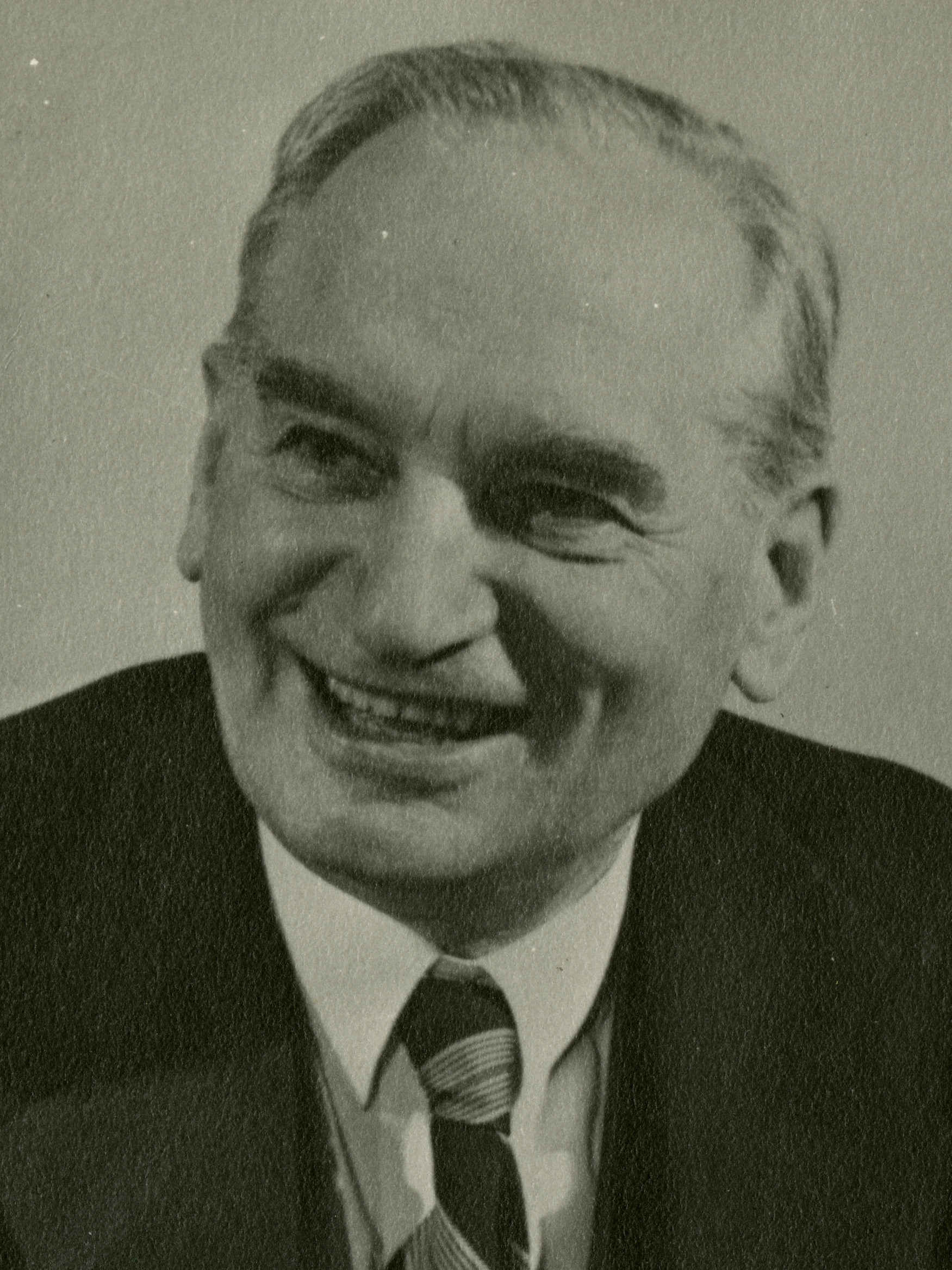

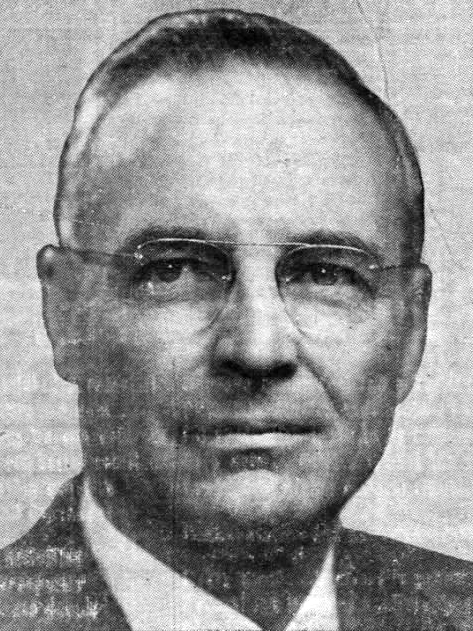
Nominee	William Langer	Harold Morrison	Fred G. Aandahl
Party	Republican	Democratic	Independent
Popular vote	157,907	55,347	24,741
Percentage	66.35%	23.26%	10.40%
- County results Langer: 50–60% 60–70% 70–80% 80–90%
Senator before election
William Langer
Republican
Elected Senator
William Langer
Republican

The 1952 United States Senate election in North Dakota took place on November 4, 1952, to elect a member of the United States Senate to represent the State of North Dakota, concurrently with other Class 1 elections to the Senate and various other federal, state, and local elections.

Incumbent Republican-NPL Senator William Langer was re-elected to a third term with 66.35% of the vote, defeating Democratic candidate Harold A. Morrison with 23.26% of the vote and independent candidate Fred G. Aandahl with 10.40% of the vote. Aandahl, the 23rd Governor of North Dakota, ran as an independent after having failed to defeat Langer in the Republican primary.

== General election ==
1952 United States Senate election in North Dakota
Party	Candidate	Votes	%	±%
Republican	William Langer (incumbent)	157,907	66.35%	+13.01%
Democratic	Harold Morrison	55,347	23.26%	+0.06%
Independent	Fred G. Aandahl	24,741	10.40%	+10.40%
Majority		102,560	43.09%	+13.21%
Total votes		237,995	100.00%	N/A
Republican hold				
