= Joseph A. Kitchen =

American politician

9th North Dakota Commissioner of Agriculture and Labor
- In office 1921–1932
- Preceded by: John N. Hagan
- Succeeded by: John Husby

Personal details
- Party: Republican (IVA faction)

Joseph A. Kitchen was a North Dakota state legislator and the state Commissioner of Agriculture and Labor from 1921 to 1932.

Following the recall of John N. Hagan, Kitchen, after receiving the endorsement of the Independent Voters Association, was elected Commissioner of Agriculture and Labor in the special election of 1921.

== See also ==
- List of North Dakota commissioners of agriculture and labor

Political offices
Preceded by John N. Hagan	North Dakota Commissioner of Agriculture and Labor; 1921–1932	Succeeded by John Husby
