= Arcola, Indiana =

- Unincorporated community
- Location within Indiana Location within the United States
- Coordinates: 41°06′23″N 85°17′28″W
- Country: United States
- State: Indiana
- County: Allen
- Township: Lake
- Elevation: 840 ft (260 m)

Population (2020)
  - Total: 33
- Time zone: UTC-5 (Eastern (EST))
  - Summer (DST): UTC-4 (EDT)
- ZIP code: 46704
- Area code: 260
- FIPS code: 18-1990
- GNIS feature ID: 2830301

Arcola is an unincorporated community and census-designated place in Lake Township, Allen County, in the U.S. state of Indiana. The population of the community is 33.

Once a train station for farm products, in more recent years it has become a bedroom community of Fort Wayne. The community has a volunteer fire department and an elementary school in the building which once housed grades one through twelve, including Arcola High School. An annual Arcola tractor pull is held in the community.

== History ==
The Arcola post office was established in 1858. The name of the community commemorates the Battle of Arcola.

== Demographics ==
The United States Census Bureau delineated Arcola as a census designated place in the 2022 American Community Survey.

== Notable people ==
- John N. Hagan, North Dakota politician
