= Everest, North Dakota =

Community in North Dakota, US

- Unincorporated community
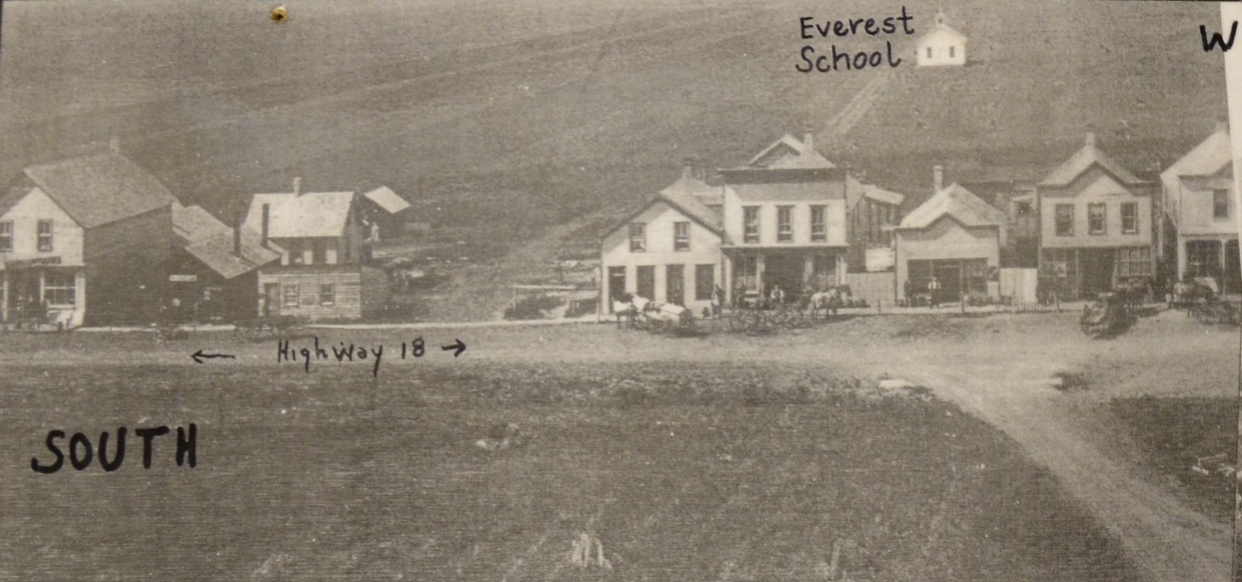
- Everest, Dakota Territory, 1895 - showing the business district

- Location within North Dakota
- Coordinates: 46°51′35″N 97°13′16″W
- Country: United States
- State: North Dakota
- County: Cass
- Township: Everest
- Elevation: 932 ft (284 m)
- Time zone: UTC-6 (Central (CST))
  - Summer (DST): UTC-5 (CDT)
- ZIP code: 58059
- Area code: 701
- GNIS feature ID: 1033853

Everest is an unincorporated community in Everest Township, Cass County, North Dakota, United States. It is located south of Casselton, and was platted in 1881. The post office was established in 1882 and operated until 1908. Everest was originally at the junction of the Great Northern Railway and the Northern Pacific Railway, but the westernmost of the two rail lines was removed circa 1896 when it was acquired by the Great Northern Railway.

Everest was the birthplace of North Dakota governor (and later US senator) William Langer, and the Langer family, including William's father Frank and uncle Joseph, were prominent residents of the Everest area during the late 1800s. Other noted residents were James Trammell, Edward Meilicke, Edward Redmon, Edward Weber, Edward Arnold, William MacFadden, and August Hilke, each of whom served as Everest Township or Cass County officials. Other prominent residents of Everest included Herbert Nilles, who was elected to the presidency of the North Dakota State Bar, and Morgan Ford, who was appointed as a judge to the US Customs Court.

Everest was the site of a railroad depot, a post office, two hotels, a school, a church, two general stores, two saloons, a butcher shop, a blacksmith shop, a lumber yard, four grain elevators, a harness maker, and other businesses. Everest once reported over 200 residents and was considered a prosperous community in the late 1800s. However, the removal of the rail line, closure of the post office, and a series of disastrous fires led to a decline in the community. By 1960, most of Everest's establishments had long since closed, leaving Everest with a population of 10 that year. Everest has been removed from official county maps.

== Geography ==
Everest is 20 miles (32 km) from Fargo, the county seat. It is 2 miles (3.2 km) south of Casselton. Everest lies at the junction of North Dakota Highway 18 and 155th Avenue SE, near the Casselton Robert Miller Regional Airport.

Everest is mostly located in section 15 of Everest Township, in southeastern North Dakota. The Durbin-Everest Channel, an intermittent stream, flows south of Everest, while the Wheatland Channel, another intermittent stream, runs north of Everest. Both streams are tributaries of Swan Creek.

== History ==
=== Early years ===
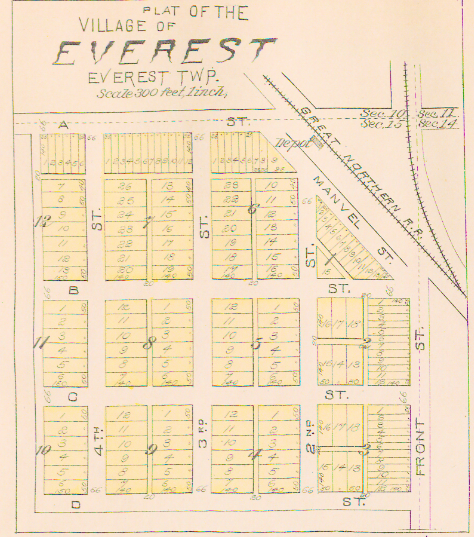
Everest, Dakota Territory, plat map in 1893

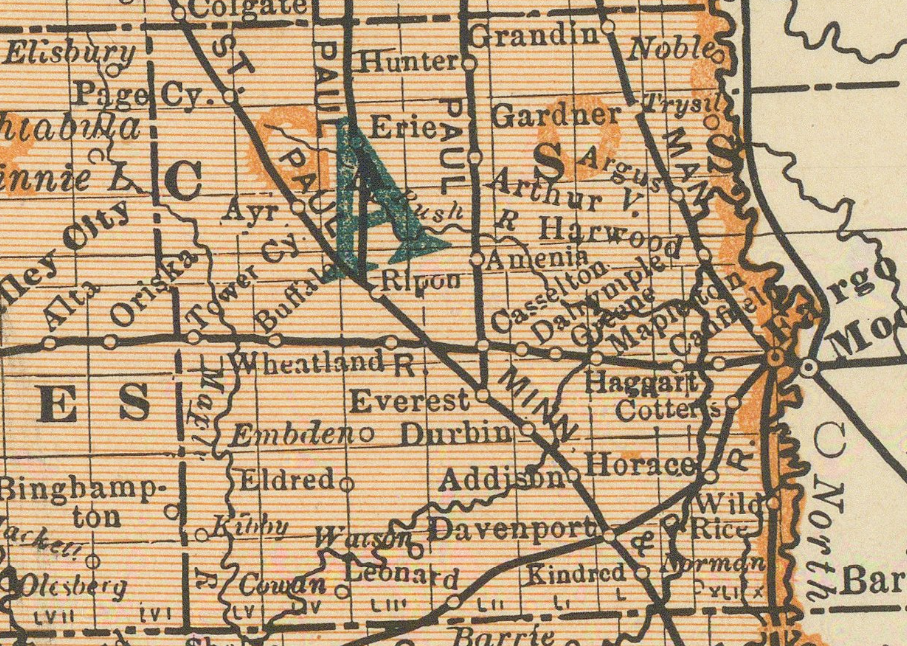
Everest in Cass County, Dakota Territory, in 1886

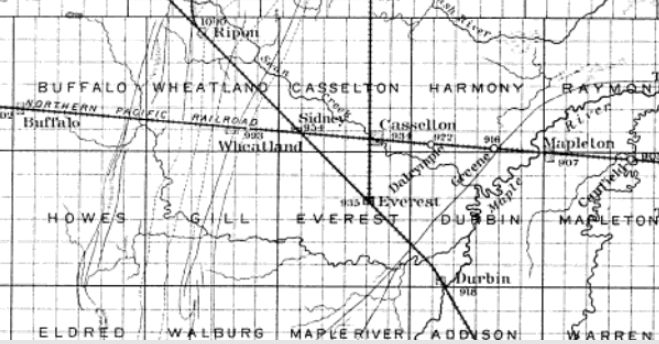
Everest, in Dakota Territory, in 1895, showing the location of the community south of Casselton, on the Durbin to Sidney rail line

Everest began as a railroad station on the St. Paul, Minneapolis, and Manitoba Railway (also known as the Great Northern Railway). In August 1880, the Casselton Branch Railroad Company (CB) was incorporated by the Northern Pacific Railway (NP). Construction began on a railroad line joining the Northern Pacific's railroad in Cass County with a station in Traill County.

Everest was platted in 1881, with the town divided into twelve blocks. The east–west streets were named A, B, C, and D Streets, with the north–south streets being named Front, Second, Third, and Fourth Streets. Manvell Street ran diagonally along the line of the Great Northern Railroad. The community was built directly west and south of the rail line. By the late 1880s, Everest was considered a "small town in Cass County [...] some 20 miles from Fargo."

There is some controversy surrounding the naming of the community. Some sources report that the community was named after the editor of The Lisbon Star, but his name was Charles Everitt.

During the summer of 1881, Everest was in development; the railroad line between Casselton and Everest had not yet been completed, and a stagecoach line connected the two communities. The first hotel in Everest was a primitive affair, with one traveler, Mary E. Hogue Black, a schoolteacher in Casselton, reporting, "As there was not any R.R. track between Everest and Casselton, I had to go by stage to Everest, where I waited, with others, for the train which failed to come. Waiting all day and no train coming, we went to a so-called Hotel for the night, where I walked between two rows of men on the floor, heads to the walls and path at their feet, to reach my bed-room, separated by a lath partition from the men’s room, sharing my room with another woman, a stranger."

In October 1882, an agreement between the Northern Pacific and the Great Northern railroads transferred the Casselton Branch from the Northern Pacific to the Great Northern Railway. The Great Northern then began a project to connect the 3 miles (4.8 km) between its lines to the Casselton Branch terminus at Everest. The rail line connecting the two railroads was announced to be nearing completion in October 1882. After completion of the connection, Everest was at the junction of the Waupeton-Ripon railroad line (between Durbin and Sidney) and the Casselton-Larimore rail line (at the terminus of that line). The Everest post office was established on May 24, 1882; Carl Knoppel was the postmaster.

On January 18, 1884, Everest Township was established. This township, along with Walberg Township, were the first civil townships established in Cass County. By this time, Everest was the site of "two general stores, a butcher shop, a blacksmith shop, a lumber yard, and two hotels, one of which proudly advertised its fine horses. There was a post office and a one-room school." The postmaster in 1884 was J.H. Rodenberg.

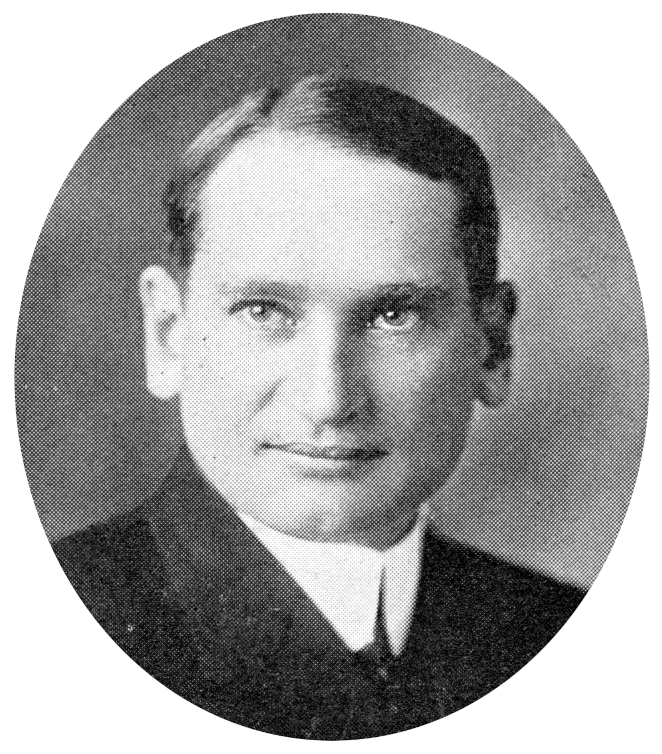
William Langer, circa 1919

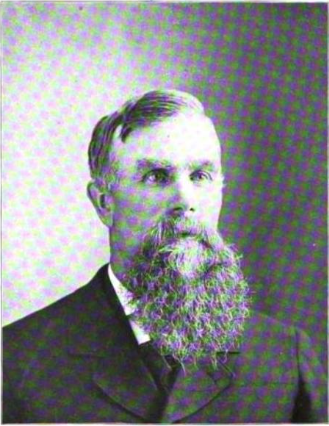
Joseph Langer in 1900

William Langer, who later twice served as governor of North Dakota, was born in Everest in 1886 (he served as governor from 1933 to 1934, and from 1937 to 1939). William Langer's father, Frank, co-owned Everest's first general store and had also helped establish the community of Everest, as he was an investor in new towns. In addition to the general store, Frank Langer also became the postmaster in 1884, and in 1889, he was elected to the 11th district in the lower house of the newly created North Dakota state legislature; he served one term, and then returned to farming. He later became a Cass County commissioner. The Langer family later moved to nearby Casselton, where William graduated from Casselton High School.

William and Frank Langer were not the only notable Langers in Everest: Frank's brother Joseph (born January 22, 1852) moved to Dakota Territory with him and helped establish the community. Joseph claimed a tree farm in Everest Township in 1877, and also invested in a mercantile in Hope. He was a member of the Masonic Lodge. He also served on the Everest Township board of supervisors for over a decade. The Langer family eventually owned many parcels of land surrounding Everest, Casselton, and other neighboring townships: according to Olsen (1967), "They owned eleven quarters in Everest [Township], three quarters in Maple River [Township], two quarters in Casselton Township, and much of the south half of section 35 in Casselton Township--the townsite section[...] The atlas also showed that Joseph Langer owned fourteen quarters of land in Casselton and Everest townships in 1906."

Among the other prominent residents of the Everest area was Edward Meilicke, who farmed in Everest Township and who also operated a mercantile in the community. Meilicke settled in the area in 1882, and served for 15 years as the chairman of the Everest Township board of supervisors. Meilicke was later profiled in an early history of North Dakota.

Another prominent resident was August Hilke (born in Germany on November 18, 1837), who was among the earliest of the white settlers in Cass County. Hilke's family emigrated to Dodge County, Wisconsin in the United States in 1852; Hilke moved to Casselton in 1878, and from there settled in section 23 of Everest Township in 1880. His wife passed in 1884, and he married Cora Clark in 1885. He became a member of the Cass County board of supervisors, was the school treasurer, and joined the Odd Fellows and the Ancient Order of United Workmen. In 1900, according to one state history, he was "the fortunate possessor of one of the best farms of Cass County, and his residence on section 23, of Everest Township, is evidence of his prosperity and thrift."

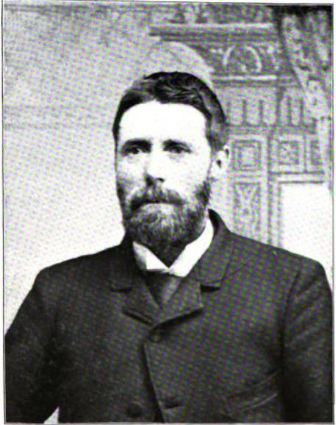
James D Trammell in 1900

James D. Trammell was another prominent resident of Everest. Trammell was a transplant from Fairfax County, Virginia who settled in Everest in 1883. Trammell served on the Everest Township board of supervisors, and was also a member of the area's Masonic Hall and Odd Fellows fraternal order.

Other prominent men of Everest included Edward Redmon and William MacFadden. Edward Redmon was born in Davenport, Iowa in 1856. He moved to the Everest area in 1877, when he went to North Dakota to claim land. He owned three sections of land, and also farmed in a fourth. He was a chairman of the Everest Township board of supervisors for many years. William McFadden was born in Mount Vernon, Ohio in 1857. He emigrated to Everest in 1885, where he became a grain buyer and farmer, purchasing land there. He was appointed deputy county treasurer, and later the cashier of the Cass County State Bank of Casselton. He was elected as Cass County treasurer in 1894 and was re-elected in 1896.

Edward Weber (born in Landskron, Austria, September 28, 1849) was another of the early residents of the Everest area. He came to the United States in 1867, marrying Rosa Stanger in 1871. He visited Cass County in 1877 with Frank and Joseph Langer. He settled in section 9 of Everest Township, where he bought land for himself, his brother, and his father circa 1877. By 1900, he owned five sections of land in the area. He served as an Everest Township official and also worked as a county assessor.

Circa 1888, Everest was the site of four grain elevators: the Cargill Elevator Company, the St. Anthony Elevator Company, the Northwestern Elevator Company, and the Mt. Vernon Elevator Company. Everest was also the site of a branch of the Beidler and Robinson Lumber Company. The population of the community was estimated as 200 in 1890.

The Everest School was built in 1881. It was originally located in a field 0.5 miles (0.80 km) west of the main structures, which was hazardous during blizzards. A rope was strung between the village and the school to prevent schoolchildren from becoming lost during snowstorms. Eventually, the school was moved into the village. The Everest School District was originally numbered 102. The Everest school building, a one-room schoolhouse, was just one of 182 schools in Cass County at that time. Two teachers were employed by the school during that era. The school building was also used as an official polling location.

Two additional schools operated in the area: the Goshen School and the Langer School. These were small Everest Township schools.

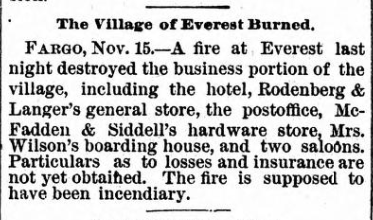
Newspaper article announcing the 1886 Everest fire

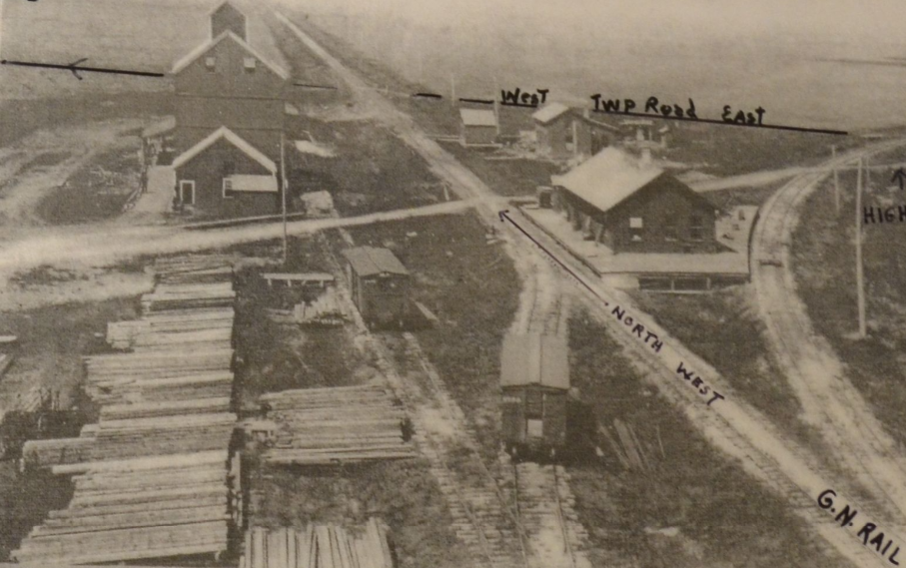
Everest, Dakota Territory, 1895, showing the railroad depot, a train, and a grain elevator

In November 1886, a fire destroyed part of Everest, including the business district. The fire made state headlines and destroyed Rodenberg and Langer's general store, two saloons, the hotel, McFadden and Siddell's hardware store, Wilson's boarding house, and the post office. The fire began in a vacant hotel room.

The Moravian Church operated in Everest during this era. William Stengel led the congregation, circa 1887.

In 1888, severe frosts in the months of May, June, and August "knocked the wheat crop to the dogs" in the Red River Valley. The eastern half of the state was badly affected, and the following year, there was a terrible drought "such as was never known in Dakota", which destroyed the next round of crops. Area farmers suffered, and many were close to starvation. Frank Langer, one of the county commissioners, advocated for a poor farm to be located in nearby Casselton, but was outvoted by the other Cass County commissioners, and the poor farm was instead built 3.5 miles (5.6 km) north of Fargo.

Everest had been founded in Cass County, in the northern half of Dakota Territory. When North Dakota and South Dakota were split and became states, they were both admitted on November 2, 1889. When the new state of North Dakota's first territorial legislature met, the state was divided into 31 congressional districts. The 11th Congressional District was a portion of Cass County: the townships of "Webster, Rush River, Hunter, Arthur, Amenia, Everest, Maple River, Leonard, Dows, Erie, Empire, Wheatland, Gill, Walburg, Watson, Page, Rich, Ayr, Buffalo, Howes, Eldrid, Highland, Rochester, Lake, Cornell, Tower, Hill, Clifton and Pontiac"; the district was entitled to one state senator and three state representatives. The state representatives included Everest resident Frank J Langer.

In March 1894, the business district of Everest was again wiped out by fire. The fire was estimated to have done $35,000 in damage (equivalent to $1,132,000 in 2025). At the time of the fire, the Hope (North Dakota) Pioneer saltily reported, "The town of Everest, Cass county, was nearly wiped out of existence by fire early Sunday morning. Jim Hill's depot didn't burn, much to the regret of all the travelers along the line who have been compelled to wait upon trains within its dirty walls."

Around that time, in either 1895 or 1896, the westernmost of the two railroad lines was pulled up, as the Great Northern Railroad Company's plans for expansion had changed. This was a 4.79 miles (7.71 km)-long rail line connecting the towns of Everest and Fleming. This was done because the Great Northern Railway was operating two parallel branch rail lines; it was stated that "for the sake of greater efficiency and the economy attained through elimination of unneeded trackage", the line between Fleming and Everest was no longer needed. The removal of the rail line would, in retrospect, cause a decline for Everest.

At this time, Everest was still considered a prosperous community, with one author writing in 1895, "The thriving towns of Everest, Casselton, and Amenia are seen in their order from south to north; and at these and many smaller stations of both the Northern Pacific and Great Northern Railways, also on some of the large farms, [grain] elevators tower above the flat lands, waiting to be filled with their grain. It is a most beautiful prospect, completely characteristic of the Red River Valley."

=== Early twentieth century ===
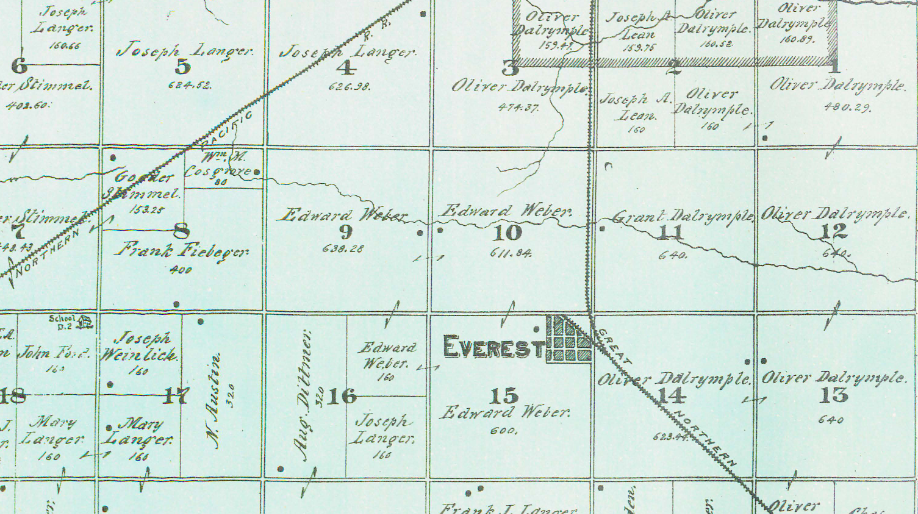
Everest, North Dakota, in 1906, showing the removed railroad line

In 1900, a loading station on the Northern Pacific Railway was named Langers, after both Joseph and Frank Langer. This station was just northeast of Everest.

The population of Everest was 213 in 1900. Circa 1906, Everest was the site of three grain elevators: those of the St. Anthony and Dakota Elevator Company, the Cargill Elevator Company, and the Northwestern Elevator Company. Everest received mail daily, had telephone service, and was the site of a harness maker and a blacksmith shop. Stagecoaches ran daily between Everest and Casselton.

The railroad depot in Everest closed in July 1903, and at that time there were reports that the post office would close as well. In 1903, Henry Albright succeeded James B. Coyle as the Everest postmaster. Paul Schiebold was the postmaster circa 1906. The Everest post office closed in 1908. Mail was subsequently routed through nearby Casselton.

By this time, several members of the Langer family had left Everest, and a new generation of businessmen operated in the community. Among these was Edward Arnold. Arnold, born in Lockport, New York on March 18, 1874, relocated to Everest and was involved in the grain business by around 1914. He became the manager of the Northwestern Elevator Company in Everest, and became a well-known resident of the community. He was a member of the Ancient Order of United Workmen (AOUW) and the Brotherhood of American Yeomen (BAY).

Another prominent resident was Herbert G Nilles, who was born in Everest in 1894. While in law school, he was a member of the Phi Delta Phi legal fraternity. He was admitted to the North Dakota Bar in 1917. In 1932, he was elected to membership in the North Dakota Chapter of the Order of the Coif. He relocated to Fargo and was elected president of the State Bar Association of North Dakota in 1939.

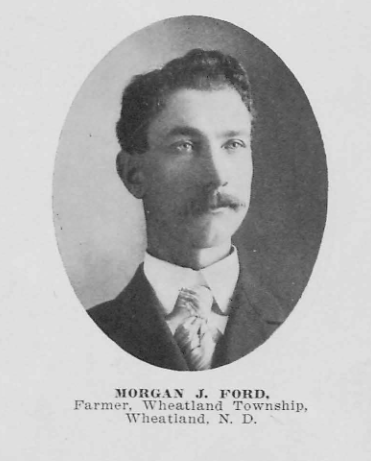
Morgan J. Ford, in 1906

Another prominent resident was Morgan Ford, who was born on a farm near Wheatland on September 8, 1911. Ford was the son of Morgan J Ford and Mary Langer Ford. After graduating from Casselton High School and the University of North Dakota, Ford returned to Cass County and taught at the Everest School for one year (1934-1935). He became the Casselton city attorney in 1942, and was nominated by President Harry S. Truman to be a judge of the United States Customs Court in 1949.

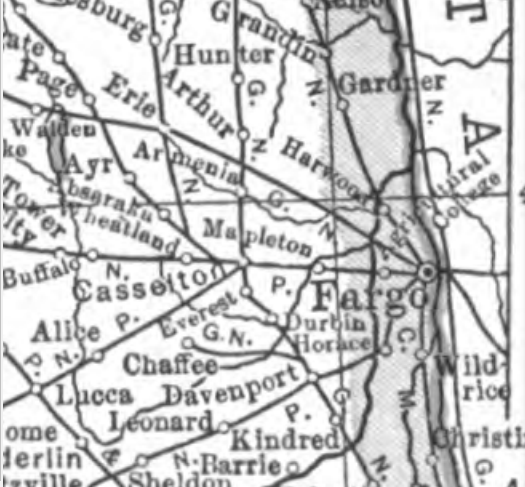
Everest and surrounding communities in 1920

In 1920, the population of Everest was 64. In 1922, there was again a fire in Everest. This fire destroyed the Northwestern Elevator Company's building in Everest, and according to a news report in the Jamestown Weekly Alert, "had the breeze prevailed toward the stores southeast of the elevator little would have been left of the town, as it was only hard work that saved the depot." According to that report, around 6,000 bushels of wheat were in the elevator at the time of the fire. The cause of the fire was unknown, with one theory being that the fire was caused by sparks from the nearby railroad, or due to friction.

In 1923, the Everest School District covered 13.5 square miles (35 km^{2}). At that time, Cass County had 142 operating schools. The Everest School District had by this point been renumbered 90. In 1928, a basement was added below the Everest Schoolhouse. In 1939, the Langer School closed, due to low enrollment.

During William Langer's gubernatorial race of 1936, it was reported that 100% of the residents of Everest Township voted for him. Similarly, it was claimed that all voters of Everest Township (63 residents) endorsed him during his Senate race of 1952.

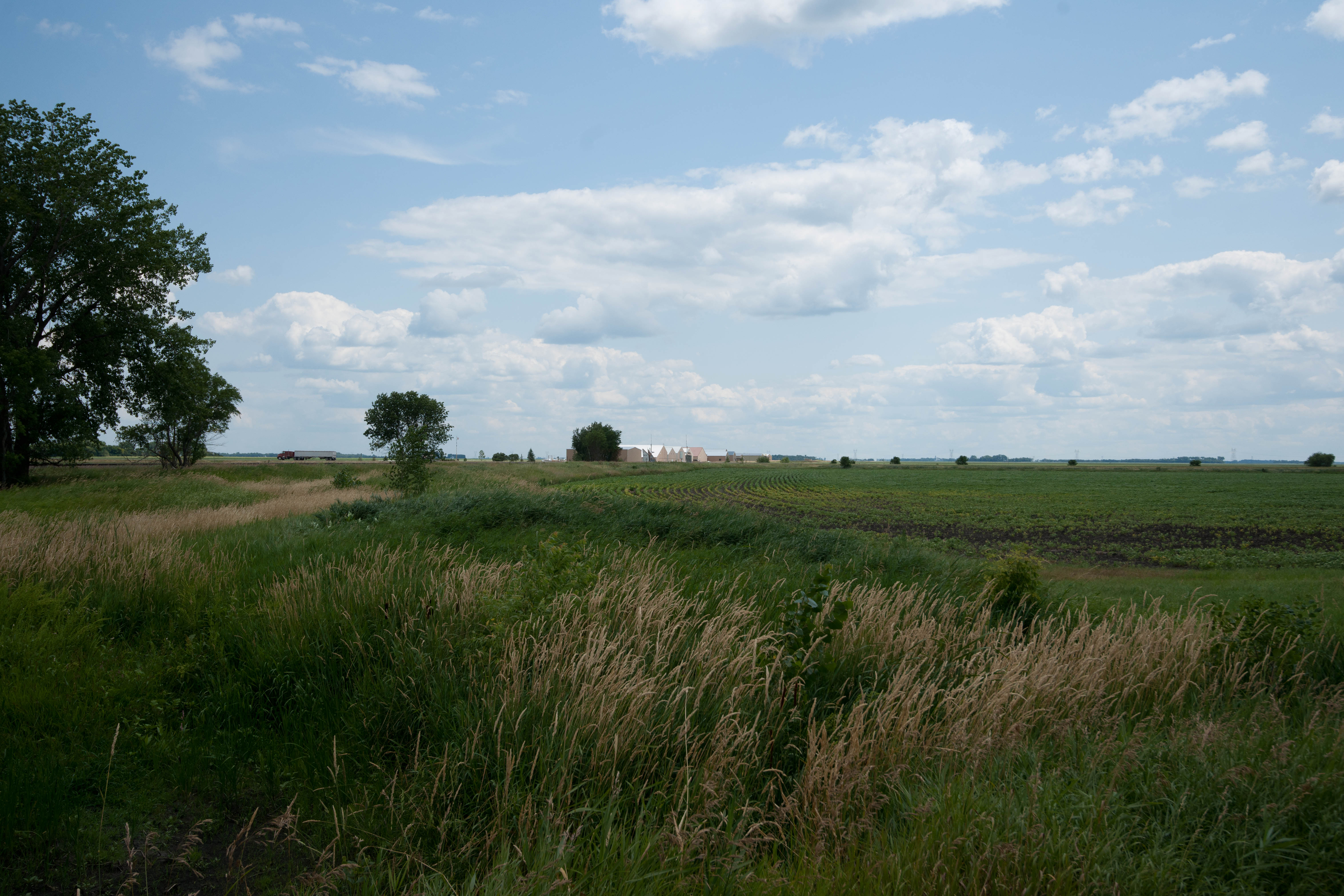
Everest in 2009

The population of Everest was estimated at 100 in 1940; the other communities along the former rail line were smaller, with Durbin reporting 22 residents and Fleming reporting 10 residents. During that era, Everest still appeared on North Dakota state maps. The general store in Everest closed in 1942.

In September 1949, enrollment at the Everest School was 17 students.

=== Late twentieth century ===
In 1952, William Langer, by that point a U.S. Senator, attempted to legally reclaim 2 acres (8,100 m^{2}) of land in the Everest area, which had been deeded to the county back in 1911 by his father, Frank Langer. Langer stated that the contract stipulated that the land would be improved, with a road and a bridge across a coulee. He stated that no bridge or road had been constructed, and he thus requested that the land be returned to the Langers. Langer passed on November 8, 1959.

In 1960, Interstate 94 replaced State Highway 10 between Casselton and Everest, on the northern edge of Everest Township.

By 1960, the population of Everest had dropped to 10. In 1962, the Everest School District #90 reported zero students. That year, both the Everest School and the Goshen School closed, consolidated into the Casselton School District. In 1968, the Casselton Elevator Company and feed plant burned to the ground; it was not rebuilt.

By 1975, Agnes Geelan wrote that Everest was just "a memory, its chief claim to fame being that 'Bill Langer was born on a farm near Everest'." In 1979, it was reported that just four families lived in Everest, and no businesses remained in the community.

Douglas Wick (1988) writes, "the village existed for many years," but the closure of the railroad station and post office, along with the removal of one of the rail lines, and a disastrous fire, helped lead to its eventual decline. Frank Weber, a longtime resident of Everest (beginning in 1893), blamed the automobile for the decline of Everest, stating, "Everest was a nice little town. That was our home trading post when we farmed on our home place, but as soon as the automobile came the people then left Everest and went on to Casselton because there was more stores, and of course more selection of good and all this and that. And then all these little towns lost out, including Everest."

Today, Everest is in the Central Cass Public School District. Everest no longer appears on official county maps. The population of all of Everest Township in 2020 was just 36 residents, with 8 households.

== Demographics ==
Historical population
Year	Pop.	±%
1890	200	—
1900	213	+6.5%
1920	64	−70.0%
1940	100	+56.2%
1960	10	−90.0%
Source: 1890 census, 1900 census, 1920 census, 1940 census, 1960 census,

== See also ==
- Hickson, North Dakota
