= Everest Township, North Dakota =

Township in North Dakota, US

- Township
- Location within North Dakota
- Coordinates: 46°50′50″N 97°14′33″W
- Country: United States
- State: North Dakota
- County: Cass

Area
  - Total: 35.08 sq mi (90.9 km^{2})
  - Land: 35.08 sq mi (90.9 km^{2})
  - Water: 0.00 sq mi (0 km^{2})
- Elevation: 935 ft (285 m)

Population (2020)
  - Total: 99
  - Density: 2.8/sq mi (1.1/km^{2})
- Time zone: UTC-6 (Central (CST))
  - Summer (DST): UTC-5 (CDT)
- Area code: 701
- FIPS code: 38-25020
- GNIS feature ID: 1036365

Everest Township is a township in Cass County, North Dakota, United States. The population was 99 at the 2020 census.

The unincorporated community of Everest is located in Everest Township.

== Geography ==
Everest Township has a total area of 35.08 square miles (90.9 km^{2}), all land.

== Demographics ==
As of the 2023 American Community Survey, there were an estimated 26 households.
