= Robert F. Flint =

American politician

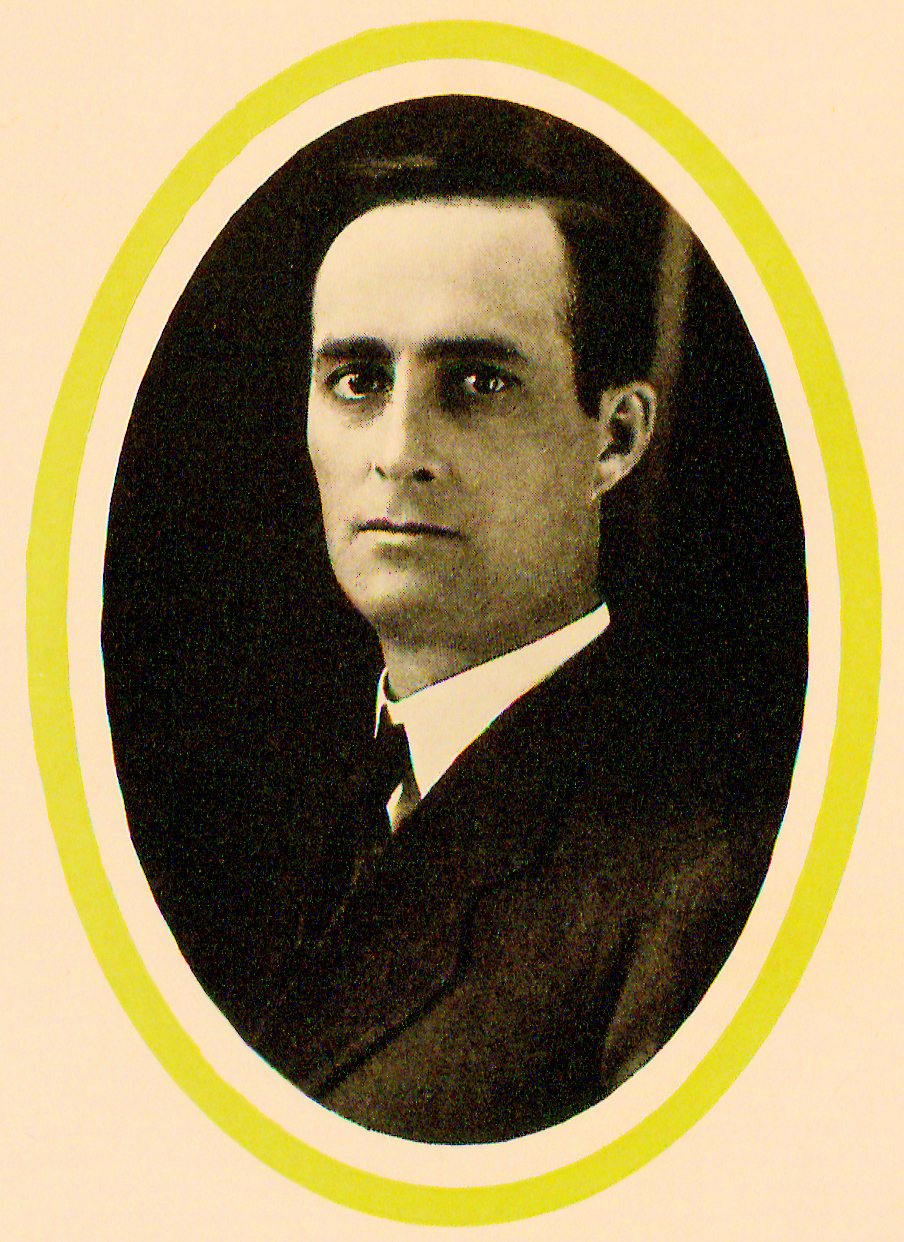

7th North Dakota Commissioner of Agriculture and Labor
- In office 1915–1916
- Governor: L. B. Hanna
- Preceded by: William C. Gilbreath
- Succeeded by: John N. Hagan

Personal details
- Party: Republican

Robert F. Flint was a prominent individual in the North Dakota dairy industry and a North Dakota Republican Party politician who served as the Assistant Dairy Commissioner from 1905 to 1909, State Dairy Commissioner from 1909 to 1915, and Commissioner of Agriculture and Labor from 1915 to 1916.

Flint was raised on a farm near Royalton, Minnesota. He worked at a creamery there from 1892 to 1899. After this, he moved to North Dakota and opened the first creamery in Oliver County at Hannover and also managed the creamery in New Salem.

In 1905, Flint was appointed Assistant Dairy Commissioner. In 1909, the State Dairy Commissioner office was created under the Department of Agriculture and Labor. Before this time, the Commissioner of Agriculture and Labor was the ex-officio state dairy commissioner.

Flint served as the State Dairy Commissioner until 1915 when he became the Commissioner of Agriculture and Labor. He served in that role until 1916.

== See also ==
- List of North Dakota commissioners of agriculture and labor
