= William C. Gilbreath =

American politician (1851–1921)

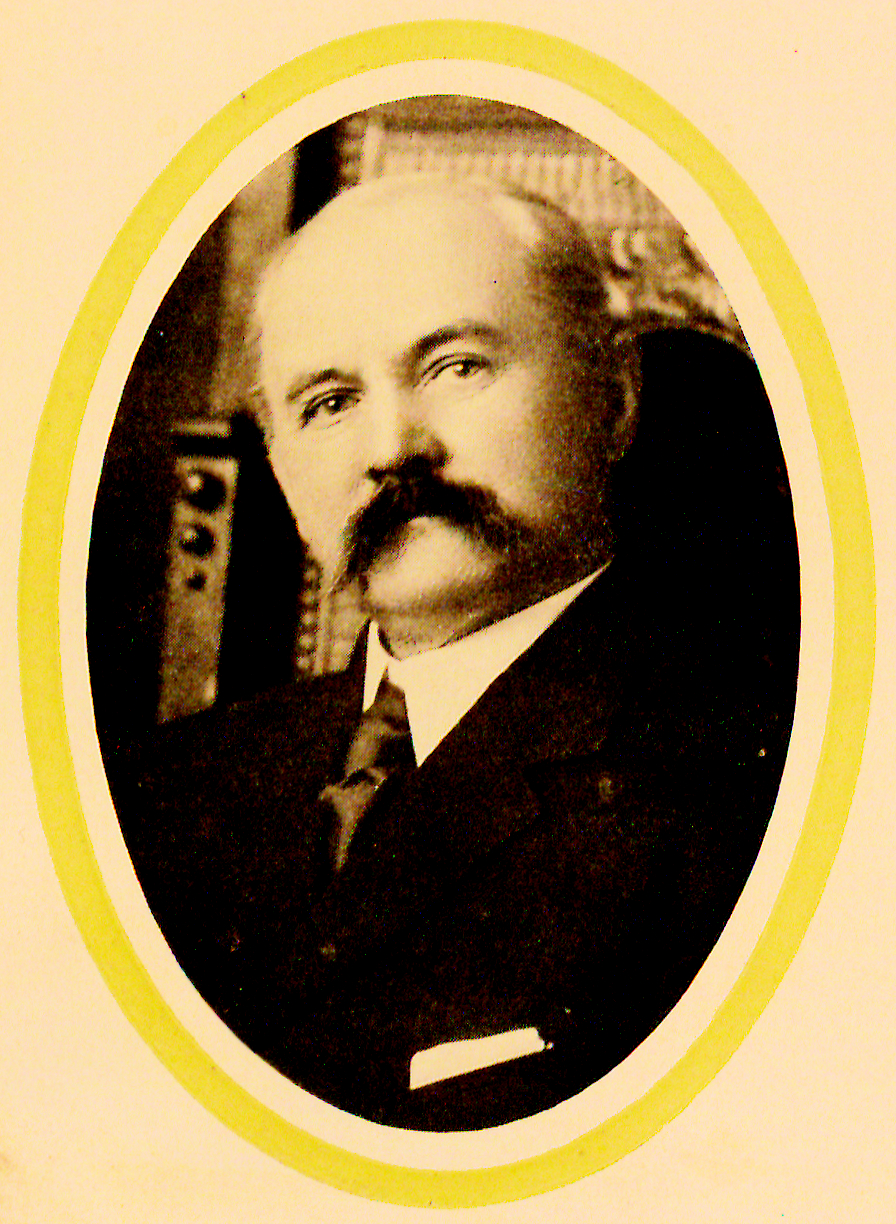

6th North Dakota Commissioner of Agriculture and Labor
- In office 1905–1914
- Governor: Elmore Y. Sarles; John Burke; L. B. Hanna
- Preceded by: Rollin J. Turner
- Succeeded by: Robert F. Flint

Personal details
- Born: September 9, 1851 McMinn County, Tennessee, U.S.
- Died: January 28, 1921 (aged 69) Bismarck, North Dakota, U.S.

William C. Gilbreath (September 9, 1851 – January 28, 1921), a.k.a. W.C. Gilbreath, was an American politician who served as the North Dakota Commissioner of Agriculture and Labor from 1905 to 1914. He was born in McMinn County, Tennessee, but his family relocated to Illinois, where he was educated in the public schools and in Wesleyan University.

W.C. Gilbreath

He came to North Dakota and engaged in the newspaper business, and later served as deputy commissioner of insurance of the state before he was elected as Commissioner of Agriculture and Labor in 1904, as a Republican. He served in that capacity until 1914, and died in Bismarck in 1921 at the age of 69.

== Bibliography ==
- North Dakota Secretary of State. "North Dakota Blue Book" (1911), pp. 527.

== See also ==
- List of North Dakota commissioners of agriculture and labor

== Notes ==
Preceded by Rollin J. Turner	North Dakota Commissioner of Agriculture and Labor; 1905–1914	Succeeded by Robert F. Flint
