= List of North Dakota commissioners of agriculture and labor =

The following is a list of North Dakota commissioners of agriculture and labor from 1889 to 1966, when the office was split into two entities: the agriculture commissioner and the labor commissioner.

Number of North Dakota commissioners of agriculture and labor by party affiliation
Party	Commissioners
Republican	9
Republican/NPL	4
Democratic-Independent	1

#	Name	Term	Party
1	Henry T. Helgesen	1889–1892	Republican
2	Nelson Williams*	1893–1894	Democratic-Independent
3	Andrew H. Laughlin	1895–1896	Republican
4	Henry U. Thomas	1897–1900	Republican
5	Rollin J. Turner	1901–1904	Republican
6	William C. Gilbreath	1905–1914	Republican
7	Robert F. Flint	1915–1916	Republican
8	John N. Hagan	1917–1921	Republican/NPL
9	Joseph A. Kitchen	1921–1932	Republican/IVA
10	John Husby	1933–1934	Republican
11	Theodore Martell	1935–1936	Republican/NPL
12	John N. Hagan	1937–1938	Republican/NPL
13	Math Dahl	1939–1964	Republican/NPL
14	Arne Dahl	1965–1966	Republican

* George E. Adams won the 1892 election, but did not qualify for the office, so Nelson Williams was appointed to the position instead.

== See also ==
- List of agriculture commissioners of North Dakota
