= Walter Welford =

American politician (1868–1952)

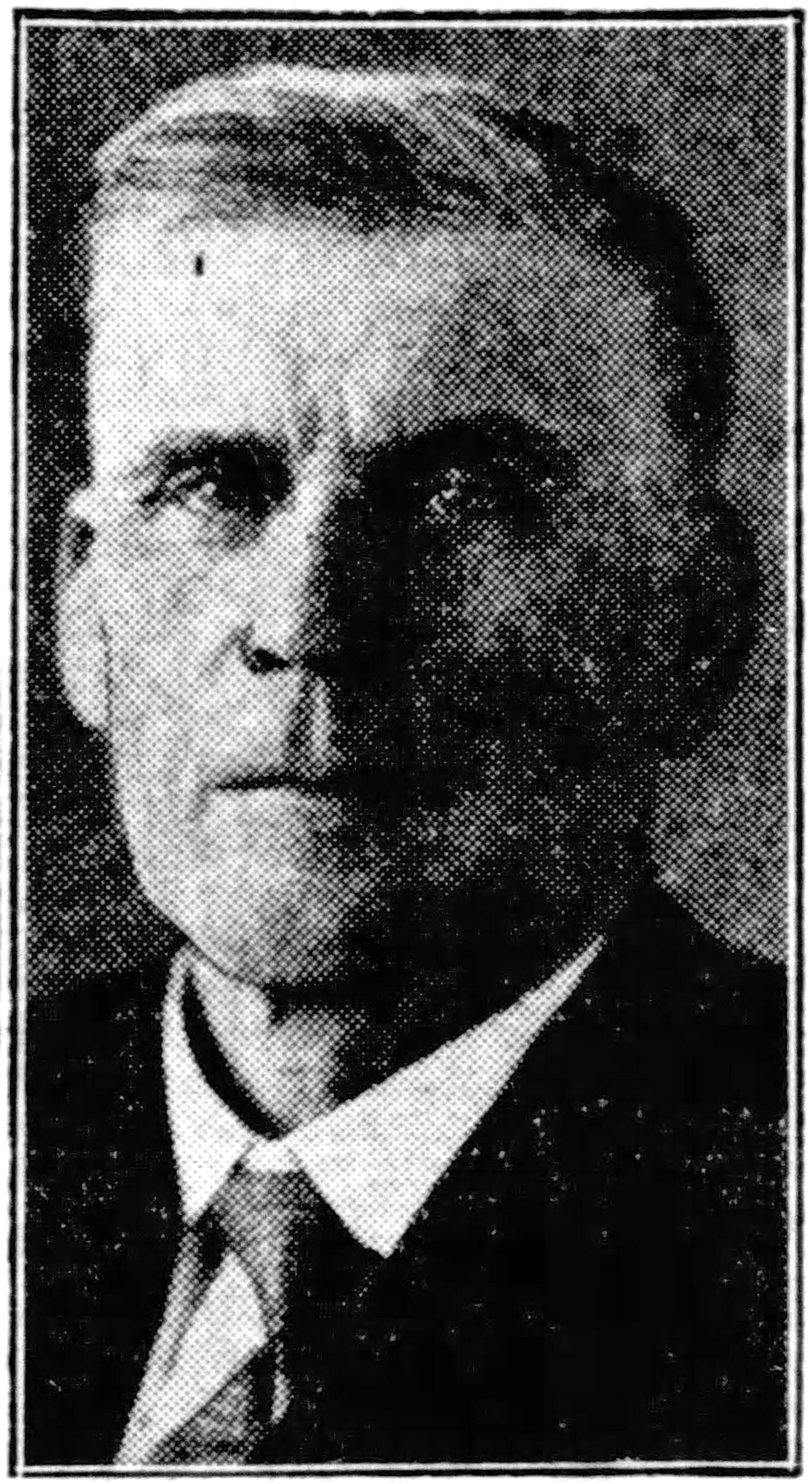
- Welford c. 1935

20th Governor of North Dakota
- In office February 2, 1935 – January 6, 1937
- Preceded by: Thomas H. Moodie
- Succeeded by: William Langer

17th Lieutenant Governor of North Dakota
- In office January 7, 1935 – February 2, 1935
- Governor: Thomas H. Moodie
- Preceded by: Ole H. Olson
- Succeeded by: Thorstein H. H. Thoresen

Member of the North Dakota Senate
- In office 1917–1921

Member of the North Dakota House of Representatives
- In office 1907–1911

Personal details
- Born: May 21, 1868 North Yorkshire, England
- Died: June 28, 1952 (aged 84) Pembina County, North Dakota
- Party: Republican (NPL)

Walter Welford (May 21, 1868 – June 28, 1952) was inaugurated as the 20th governor of North Dakota on February 2, 1935, after Thomas H. Moodie was removed after it was determined he was ineligible to hold the office. Welford lost the 1936 election to former governor William Langer, and served until the end of his term in January 1937.

== Biography ==
Born in the North Yorkshire village of Bellerby on 21 May 1868, Welford moved with his family to Pembina, North Dakota, in 1879. A farmer, he also served as Vice President of the Merchants Bank of Pembina County. He was married to Edith Bachmann and they had one child who died in infancy.

== Career ==
Welford served as township clerk at Pembina for twenty years. He also served in the North Dakota House of Representatives (1907 to 1911) and Senate (1917 to 1921). As the lieutenant governor of North Dakota, Welford became governor after Thomas H. Moodie was disqualified. Welford was a staunch supporter of the Nonpartisan League (NPL), a farmers' political group. During Welford's administration the state was caught in the grip of the Great Depression. The 1936 crop yield was disastrously low because of drought. Welford met with President Franklin Roosevelt and obtained federal aid for drought-stricken farmers. In 1936, Welford decided to run for office again. He beat former Governor William Langer for the Republican gubernatorial nomination, but Langer refused to drop out, and entered the general election as an independent. Welford lost the three-way governor's election to Langer. (The third-place candidate was Democrat John Moses, who became North Dakota's twenty-second governor, following Langer's second term.)

== Death ==
Welford died on June 28, 1952, at the age of 84 en route to a hospital in Altona, Manitoba after being stricken at his home in Pembina County. He is buried in Cavalier Cemetery, Cavalier, Pembina County, North Dakota US.

== See also ==
- List of United States governors born outside the United States

Party political offices
Preceded by Ole H. Olson	Republican nominee for Lieutenant Governor of North Dakota; 1934	Succeeded by Thorstein H. H. Thoresen
Preceded by Lydia Cady Langer	Republican nominee for Governor of North Dakota; 1936	Succeeded by John N. Hagan
Political offices
Preceded by Ole H. Olson	Lieutenant Governor of North Dakota; 1935	Succeeded by Thorstein H.H. Thoresen
Preceded by Thomas H. Moodie	Governor of North Dakota; 1935–1937	Succeeded by William Langer
