= Thorstein H. H. Thoresen =

American politician

T. H. Thoresen
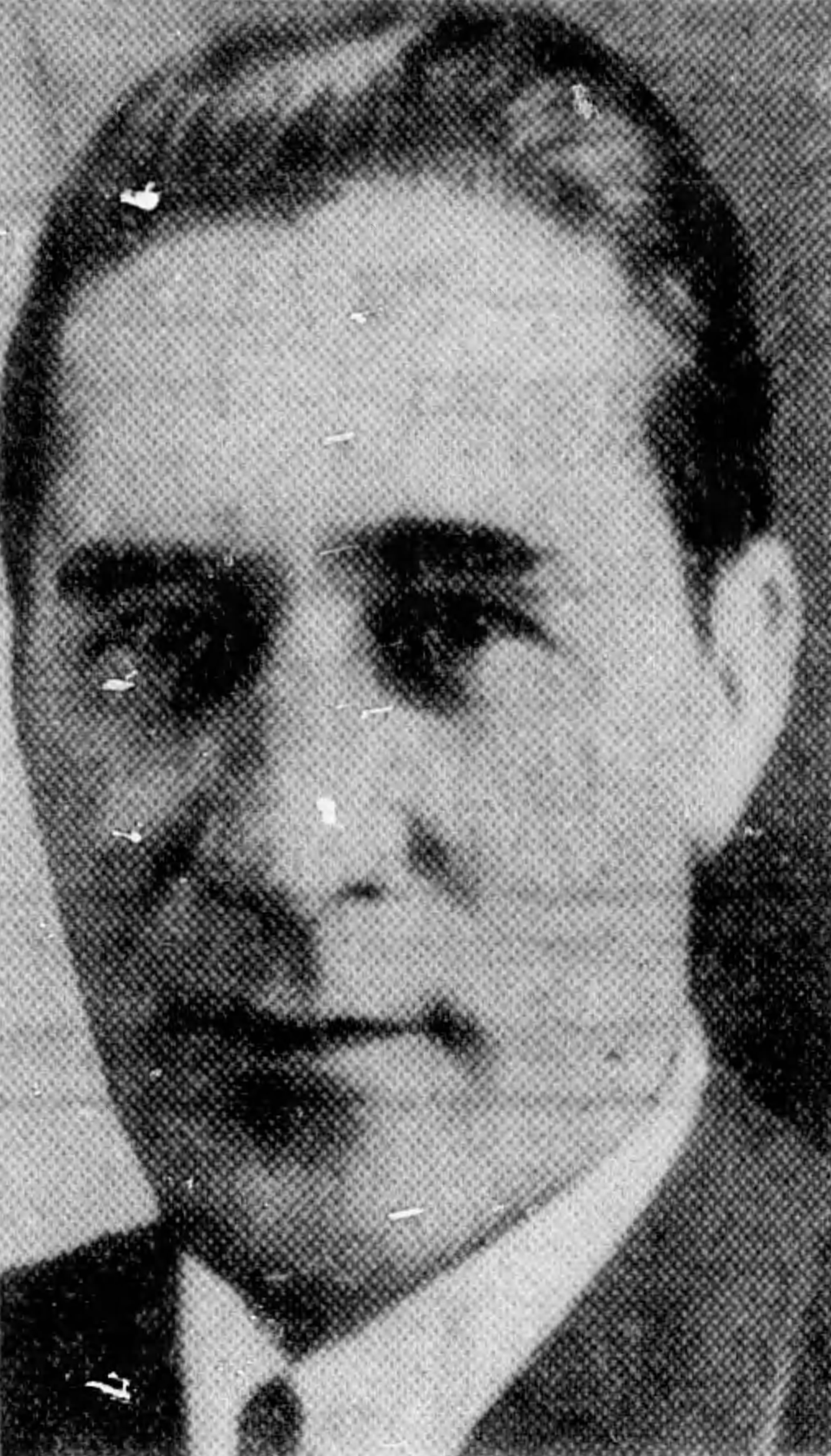
- Thoreson c. 1936

18th Lieutenant Governor of North Dakota
- In office January 6, 1937 – January 5, 1939
- Governor: William Langer
- Preceded by: Walter Welford
- Succeeded by: Jack A. Patterson

Personal details
- Born: December 9, 1885 Horten, Norway
- Died: April 17, 1956 (aged 70) Bismarck, North Dakota, U.S.
- Party: North Dakota Nonpartisan League
- Other political affiliations: Republican

Thorstein Hartvig Haugen Thoresen (December 9, 1885 – April 17, 1956) was a Norwegian-American lawyer and politician in the state of North Dakota. He served as the 18th lieutenant governor of North Dakota from 1937 to 1939 under Governor William Langer.

Thoresen was born in Horten, Norway in 1885, the son of Thor and Maren Sibile Thoresen. He previously practiced law in Dunn Center, North Dakota where he also served as state attorney of Dunn County. In 1924, he was an unsuccessful candidate for Attorney General of North Dakota, and in 1928 an unsuccessful candidate for Governor, losing both times to George F. Shafer. Thoresen served as the North Dakota Tax Commissioner from 1925 to July 1929; upon his retirement he established a law practice at Grand Forks, North Dakota. Though affiliated with the North Dakota Nonpartisan League throughout his life, he served as lieutenant governor from 1937 to 1939 under Republican William Langer. Later, he served as mayor of Grand Forks from 1940 to 1944, was named assistant attorney general of North Dakota in 1952, and moved to Bismarck. He died at a hospital in Bismarck, North Dakota on April 17, 1954.

Party political offices
Vacant Title last held by Rheinhart J. Kamplin	Democratic nominee for North Dakota Attorney General; 1924	Succeeded by S. L. Nuchols
Preceded by Walter Welford	Republican nominee for Lieutenant Governor of North Dakota; 1936	Succeeded by Jack A. Patterson
