= Andrew Miller (North Dakota judge) =

American judge (1870–1960)

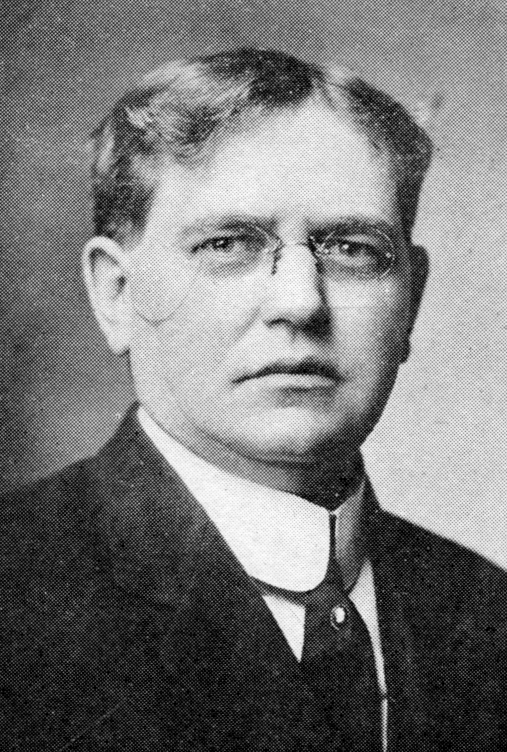

Senior Judge of the United States District Court for the District of North Dakota
- In office March 29, 1941 – March 17, 1960

Judge of the United States District Court for the District of North Dakota
- In office February 2, 1922 – March 29, 1941
- Appointed by: Warren G. Harding
- Preceded by: Seat established by 42 Stat. 66
- Succeeded by: Charles Joseph Vogel

Personal details
- Born: Andrew Miller; November 16, 1870 Denmark
- Died: March 17, 1960 (aged 89) Fort Lauderdale, Florida, U.S.
- Party: Republican
- Education: read law

Andrew Miller (November 16, 1870 – March 17, 1960) was the North Dakota Attorney General from 1909 to 1914, and later served as a United States district judge of the United States District Court for the District of North Dakota.

== Education and career ==
Miller was born in Denmark, emigrating to the United States with his parents when he was two years old. His early boyhood was spent in New York and Vermont. In 1880, he moved to Chickasaw County, Iowa, with his parents, and until 1894 followed the occupation of farming. In the spring of that year he read law in the office of A. C. Ripley, at Garner, Iowa. He was admitted to the bar in Des Moines, Iowa, in 1894, and in May of that year he opened an office for general practice at Buffalo Center, Iowa. In the fall of 1896 he was elected county attorney for Winnebago County, Iowa, and in January, 1897, moved to Forest City, Iowa, the county seat of Winnebago County. Miller was elected Mayor of Forest City in 1898 and re-elected in 1900. In 1903 he made a failed bid for a seat in the Iowa General Assembly. Miller moved to Bismarck, North Dakota in June 1905. He engaged there in the practice of law, and was appointed assistant Attorney General of the state in 1907, and elected Attorney General of North Dakota in 1908 as a Republican. He took office in January 1909, serving until January 1915. In 1914, he challenged incumbent United States Senator Asle Gronna in the Republican primary, but Gronna won and Miller finished third among four candidates. Miller then returned to private practice in Bismarck until 1922.

== Federal judicial service ==
Miller was nominated by President Warren G. Harding on December 19, 1921, to the United States District Court for the District of North Dakota, to a new seat authorized by 42 Stat. 66. He was confirmed by the United States Senate on February 2, 1922, and received commission the same day. He assumed senior status on March 29, 1941. His service terminated on March 17, 1960, due to his death in Fort Lauderdale, Florida.

=== Notable cases ===
Among the matters over which Miller presided was a suit alleging fraud against Governor William Langer, in 1934. Langer was convicted and removed from office. However, the conviction was overturned on appeal, and the case against Langer was retried twice in 1935. Miller, following a recusal motion by Langer, refused to step down as judge in the first retrial, which resulted in a hung jury. The second retrial of the original charges, presided over by a judge other than Miller, resulted in Langer's acquittal; subsequently Langer was reelected governor in 1936.

== Personal ==
Miller married Ava Mabel Wing of Iowa on May 28, 1896, and they raised four children.

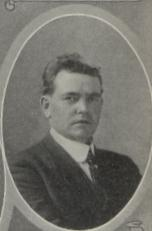
Portrait of Andrew Miller

== Bibliography ==
- North Dakota Secretary of State. "North Dakota Blue Book" (1911), pp. 527.

== See also ==
- List of attorneys general of North Dakota

== Sources ==
Legal offices
Preceded by Thomas F. McCue	Attorney General of North Dakota; 1909–1914	Succeeded by Henry Linde
Preceded by Seat established by 42 Stat. 66	Judge of the United States District Court for the District of North Dakota; 1922–1941	Succeeded by Charles Joseph Vogel
