= Ole H. Olson =

American politician (1872–1954)

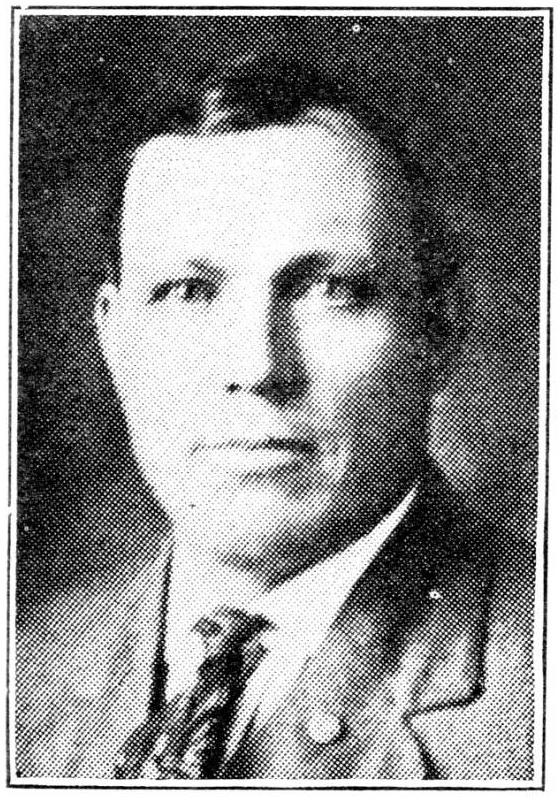
- Olson c. 1920

18th Governor of North Dakota
- In office June 21, 1934 – January 7, 1935
- Preceded by: William Langer
- Succeeded by: Thomas H. Moodie

16th Lieutenant Governor of North Dakota
- In office 1933–1934
- Governor: William Langer
- Preceded by: John W. Carr
- Succeeded by: Walter Welford

Member of the North Dakota Senate
- In office 1919–1931

Member of the North Dakota House of Representatives
- In office 1917–1919

Personal details
- Born: September 19, 1872 Mondovi, Wisconsin
- Died: January 29, 1954 (aged 81) New Rockford, North Dakota
- Party: Republican

Ole H. Olson (September 19, 1872 – January 29, 1954) was the 16th lieutenant governor and 18th governor of North Dakota.

== Biography ==
Olson was born in Mondovi, Wisconsin. He was the oldest child of nine from parents who had emigrated from Sogn, Norway. After graduating from Concordia College, in Moorhead, Minnesota, Olson moved to Eddy County, North Dakota, and established a successful farm. He married Julia Ramberget on December 12, 1912, and they had four sons and six daughters.

== Career ==
Elected to the North Dakota House of Representatives, Olson served from 1917 to 1919. He was then elected to the North Dakota State Senate, serving from 1919 to 1931, and as president pro tempore in 1929. Olson was elected the 16th lieutenant governor of North Dakota. In 1934, Governor William Langer was removed from office and sentenced to prison after a scandal, and Olson was sworn in as the 18th governor. He served the remainder of Langer's term. During his brief tenure, demonstrators marched on the state capitol and the National Guard was called in.

== Death ==
Olson died in New Rockford, North Dakota, on January 29, 1954, at the age of 81. He is buried at Grandfield Lutheran Cemetery in rural Sheyenne, Eddy County, North Dakota.

Party political offices
Preceded by John W. Carr	Republican nominee for Lieutenant Governor of North Dakota; 1932	Succeeded by Walter Welford
Preceded by Clarence E. Omdahl	Democratic nominee for North Dakota Insurance Commissioner; 1940	Succeeded by John N. Hagan
Political offices
Preceded by John W. Carr	Lieutenant Governor of North Dakota; 1933–1934	Succeeded by Walter Welford
Preceded by William Langer	Governor of North Dakota; 1934–1935	Succeeded by Thomas H. Moodie
