= William Langer =

North Dakota politician (1886–1959)

Bill Langer
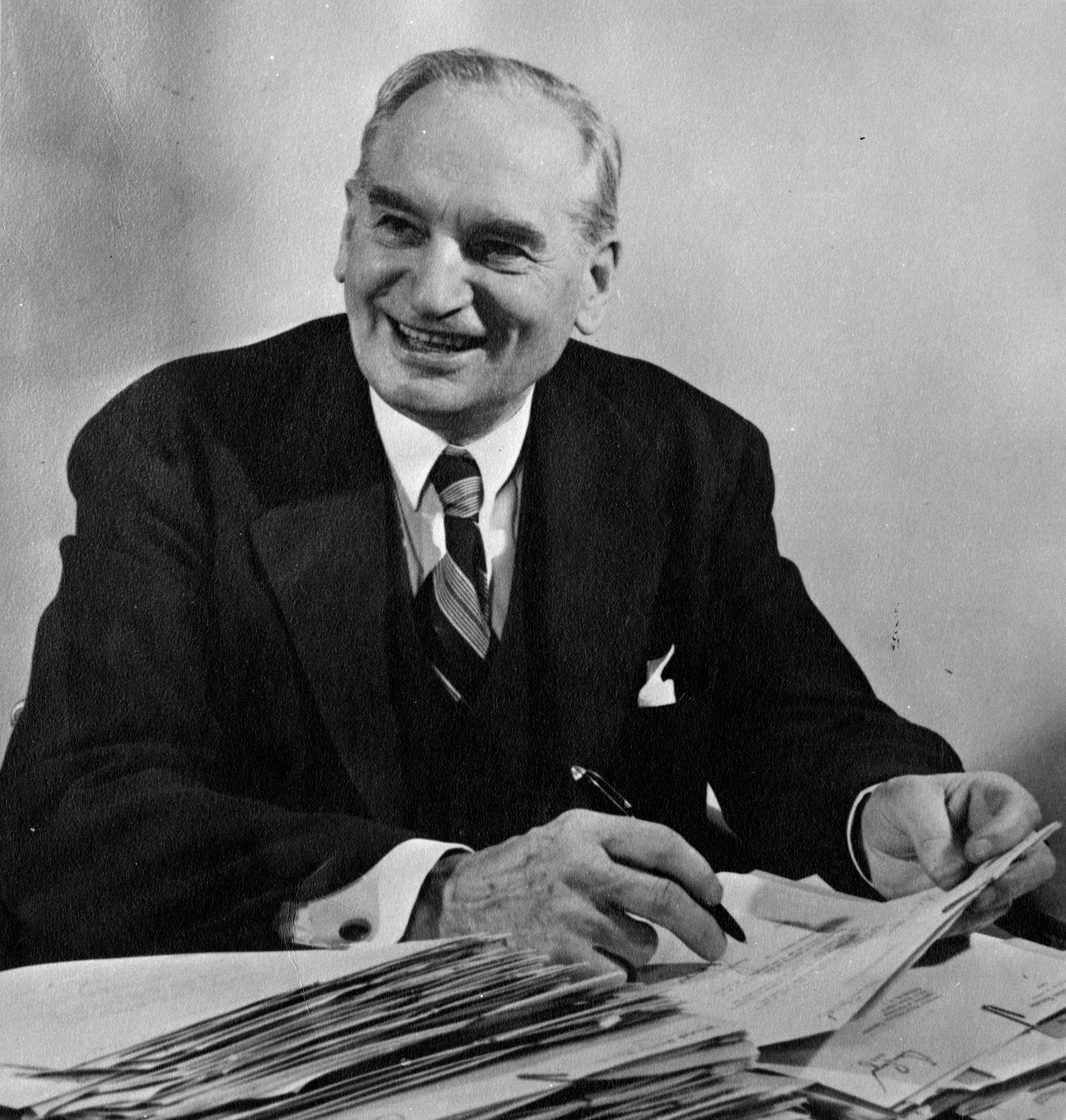

United States Senator from North Dakota
- In office January 3, 1941 – November 8, 1959
- Preceded by: Lynn Frazier
- Succeeded by: Norman Brunsdale

17th and 21st Governor of North Dakota
- In office January 6, 1937 – January 5, 1939
- Lieutenant: Thorstein H. H. Thoresen
- Preceded by: Walter Welford
- Succeeded by: John Moses
- In office December 31, 1932 – June 21, 1934
- Lieutenant: Ole H. Olson
- Preceded by: George F. Shafer
- Succeeded by: Ole H. Olson

10th Attorney General of North Dakota
- In office January 3, 1917 – January 5, 1921
- Governor: Lynn Frazier
- Preceded by: Henry Linde
- Succeeded by: William Lemke

Personal details
- Born: September 30, 1886 Casselton, Dakota Territory, U.S. (now North Dakota)
- Died: November 8, 1959 (aged 73) Washington, D.C., U.S.
- Party: Republican (NPL faction)
- Spouse: Lydia Cady
- Education: University of North Dakota (LLB); Columbia University (BA)

William "Wild Bill" Langer (September 30, 1886 – November 8, 1959) was an American lawyer and politician who served as the 17th governor of North Dakota from 1932 to 1934 and the 21st governor from 1937 to 1939. His governorship was demarcated by a scandal that forced him out of office and into multiple trials.

Langer was elected to the United States Senate in 1940, serving until he died in office in 1959. As a senator, he strongly opposed American military involvement in world affairs, being derided by his opponents as an isolationist.

== Early life, education and early career ==
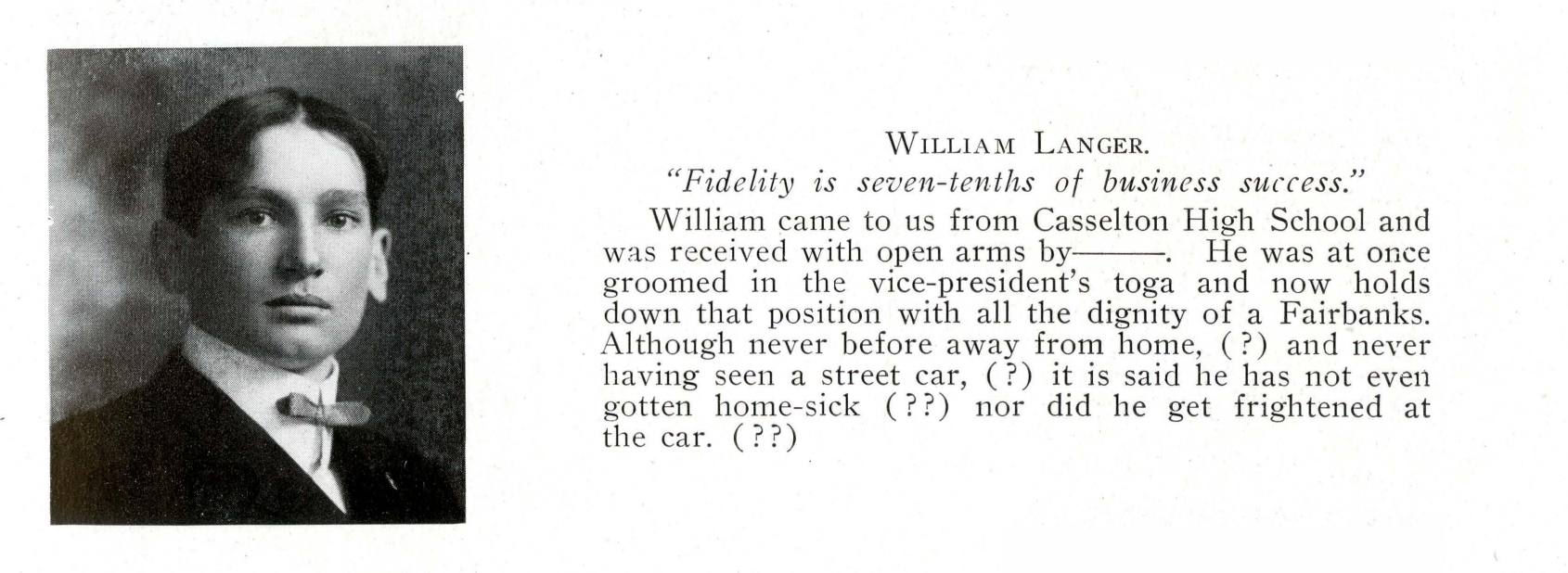
Langer in the University of North Dakota yearbook, 1906

Langer was born on September 30, 1886, near Everest, Dakota Territory, to German-Americans Frank and Mary (Weber) Langer. His Catholic father, Frank Langer, was a member of the first legislature of the state of North Dakota. William, who spoke German fluently, was valedictorian of Casselton High School upon graduation in 1904. He obtained a bachelor of laws from the University of North Dakota School of Law in Grand Forks, but was too young upon graduation to practice law. He therefore continued his undergraduate education at Columbia, where he was a member of the Philolexian Society, and graduated at the top of his class in 1910. Although he was offered a position at a prominent New York law firm, he elected to return to North Dakota, where he practiced law in Mandan before starting his career in politics.

== Personal life ==
Langer married Lydia Cady, the daughter of New York architect J. Cleaveland Cady, in 1918, and had four daughters, Emma, Lydia, Mary, and Cornelia (who became a wife of abstract painter Kenneth Noland).

== Career ==
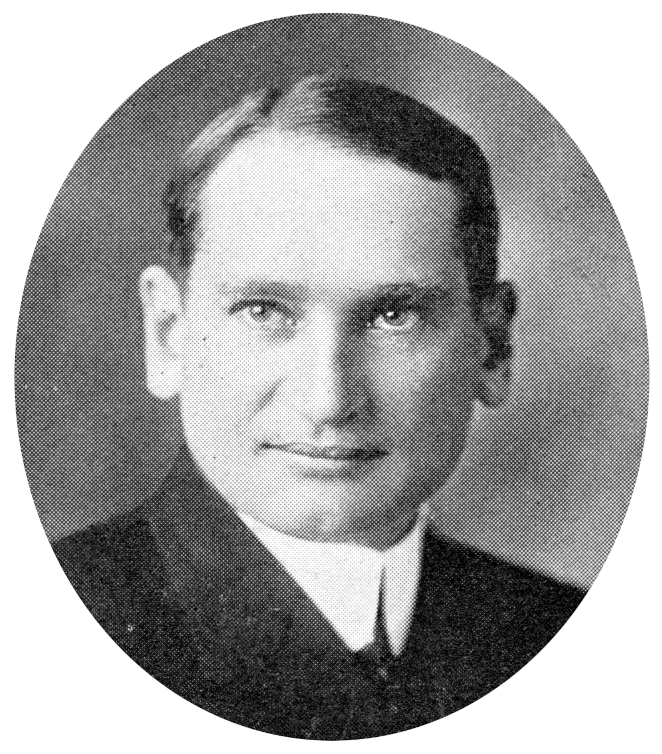
Langer as North Dakota Attorney General c. 1919

In 1914, Langer was appointed state's attorney of Morton County and was one of a few non-farmers on the Nonpartisan League (NPL) Republican 1916 state ticket. He was elected state attorney general as the newly formed NPL party swept to victory in the 1916 election, but soon clashed with the party's founder and mercurial leader Arthur C. Townley. By 1920, Langer was publicly accusing Townley of Bolshevism, and failed in a primary campaign to replace the incumbent NPL governor Lynn Frazier as the party's gubernatorial candidate. Langer's break with the NPL leadership was a reflection of the infighting that limited the party's eventual influence on North Dakota politics.

=== Governorships ===
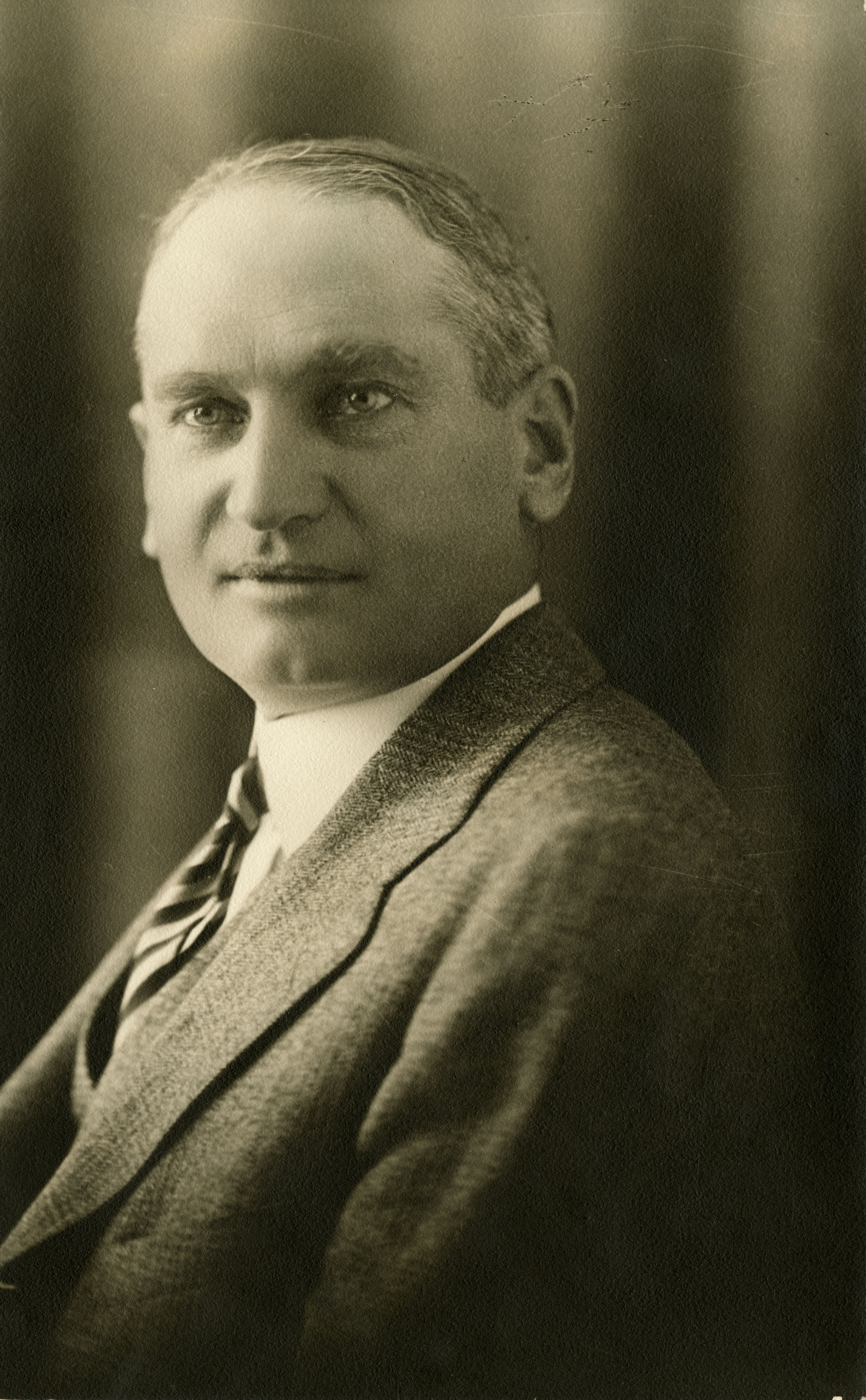
Langer as governor c. 1932–1939

Langer eventually mended his rift with the NPL and was elected governor of North Dakota in 1932. As governor, Langer in 1933 required all state employees to donate part of their annual salaries to the NPL and to the Leader, a weekly newspaper owned by high-ranking officials in his administration. Collecting this money was not prohibited by state law and was a common, traditional practice. But when donations were made by highway department employees, who were paid through federal relief programs, the U.S. Attorney for North Dakota, P. W. Lanier, charged that the donations constituted a conspiracy to defraud the federal government. Brought to trial in 1934, Langer and five co-conspirators were convicted. The trial was presided over by Judge Andrew Miller and prosecuted by Lanier, two of Langer's strongest political opponents in the state.

The first trial was littered with procedural errors that made it invalid on appeal, including improper and rigged jury selection (the jurors were alleged to have had personal bias against Langer and been hand-picked by Lanier) and heavily biased jury instructions.

Because of the felony conviction, the North Dakota Supreme Court on July 17, 1934, ordered Langer removed from office and declared Lieutenant Governor Ole H. Olson the legitimate governor. Langer signed a Declaration of Independence of North Dakota, declared martial law in Bismarck, and barricaded himself in the governor's mansion. He eventually relented when his own officers refused to recognize his authority, and Olson served the remainder of Langer's term as governor.

In 1935, the convictions were overturned on appeal. The case against Langer was retried twice in 1935. Miller, following a recusal motion by Langer, refused to step down as judge in the first retrial, which resulted in a hung jury. Between the second and third trials, Lanier filed charges against Langer for committing perjury in his recusal motion against Miller. This trial, unprecedented on perjury in an affidavit requesting a recusal, resulted in a directed verdict to acquit Langer. The second retrial of the original charges, presided over by a judge other than Miller, resulted in Langer's acquittal.

Throughout the trials, Langer maintained that he was innocent and the victim of a political vendetta by Miller and Lanier. He was reelected governor in 1936. Historian Lawrence Larsen has called Langer "a master of political theater".

Langer's wife, Lydia, ran for governor in 1934 but lost to Democratic candidate Thomas H. Moodie.

=== Senate career ===
In 1938, Langer ran for the Senate as an independent, and received 42% of the vote, losing to Republican Gerald Nye.

The 1940 Senate election was another very dramatic one. Langer defeated incumbent Lynn Frazier in the Republican primary, and then faced both the Democratic candidate, Charles Joseph Vogel, and Republican/NPL Congressman William Lemke, who declined to run for reelection to Congress in order to run for the Senate as an independent. Langer won the election with 38% of the vote.

Because of the trials mentioned above, Langer's qualifications were questioned under Article 1, Section 5 of the Constitution, which declares the U.S. Senate the ultimate judge of its members' elections, qualifications, and returns. The Senate seated Langer conditionally and began an investigation into his trials. The Committee on Privileges and Elections found Langer guilty of "moral turpitude" and unqualified to be a U.S. senator. The full Senate reversed the committee and voted to seat Langer. The vote to expel Langer failed, then needing 64 votes to reach the two-third majority to pass.

Biographer Glenn H. Smith calls Langer's Senate career "A Study in Isolationism, 1940–1959" and emphasizes his close ties with German American and Scandinavian American voters who bitterly remembered the First World War in the Dakotas and deeply distrusted Britain and the United Nations. Like Senator Henrik Shipstead of Minnesota, Langer championed non-interventionism and supported minimizing America's involvement in World War II. At home, he concentrated on making life easier for North Dakotan farmers by raising wheat prices and granting government relief. He was also adamant about implementing affordable healthcare for everyone. As a senator, he served on the Post Office, Civil Service and Indian Affairs committees. He and Shipstead were the only senators to vote against the United Nations Charter in 1945. He was also one of seven senators to oppose full U.S. entry into the United Nations.

After African-American organizations asked Langer to propose a bill for the federal government to pay for the repatriation of African-Americans to the African continent, he did so. The bill, S. 1800, failed to pass. Langer was a Zionist who supported the establishment of Israel. During World War II, he had also supported American action to rescue Jewish refugees.

In September 1950, Langer filibustered to prevent the override of President Harry S. Truman's veto of the McCarran Internal Security Act for five hours before collapsing.

In 1951, Langer lobbied John J. McCloy, the U.S. High Commissioner for Germany, to grant a reprieve to Martin Sandberger, a high-ranking SS official who had been convicted of crimes against humanity and war crimes for his role in the mass murder of Jews and others in Estonia during the Holocaust. Although sentenced to die by the tribunal of the Einsatzgruppen trial, in no small part due to Langer's lobbying, Sandberger's sentence was commuted and he served only 13 years in custody. He died in 2010, at the age of 98.

Langer was the keynote speaker at the 1955 Prohibition National Convention, a presidential nominating convention for the Prohibition Party.

After the Nonpartisan League merged with the state Democratic party, Langer remained on the Republican ticket in the 1958 Senate elections and won without making a single campaign appearance in the state. He voted for the Civil Rights Act of 1957. Langer died in Washington, D.C., on November 8, 1959. He was the last U.S. senator to lie in state in the Senate Chamber until Robert Byrd of West Virginia in 2010.

== Political offices ==
- 1914–1916: State's Attorney for Morton County
- 1916–1920: Attorney General of North Dakota
- 1933–1934: Governor of North Dakota (removed from office)
- 1937–1939: Governor of North Dakota
- 1941–1959: United States Senate

== Works ==
- The Famine in Germany. Washington, DC: US Government Printing Office, 1946.
- The Nonpartisan League; Its Birth, Activities and Leaders. Mandan, ND: Morton County Farmers Press, 1920.

== See also ==
- 1952 United States Senate election in North Dakota
- 1958 United States Senate election in North Dakota
- List of United States senators expelled or censured
- List of members of the United States Congress who died in office (1950–1999)

== Footnotes ==
Legal offices
Preceded by Henry Linde	Attorney General of North Dakota; 1917–1920	Succeeded by William Lemke
Party political offices
Preceded by Henry Linde	Republican nominee for North Dakota Attorney General; 1916, 1918	Succeeded by William Lemke
Preceded by George F. Shafer	Republican nominee for Governor of North Dakota; 1932, 1934 (withdrew)	Succeeded by Lydia Cady Langer
Vacant Title last held by William Lemke; 1922	Nonpartisan League nominee for Governor of North Dakota; 1936	Last
Preceded by Lynn Frazier	Republican nominee for U.S. Senator from North Dakota (Class 1); 1940, 1946, 1952, 1958	Succeeded by John Davis
Political offices
Preceded by George F. Shafer	Governor of North Dakota; 1932–1934	Succeeded by Ole H. Olson
Preceded by Walter Welford	Governor of North Dakota; 1937–1939	Succeeded by John Moses
U.S. Senate
Preceded by Lynn Frazier	U.S. Senator (Class 1) from North Dakota; 1941–1959; Served alongside: Gerald Nye, John Moses, Milton Young	Succeeded by C. Norman Brunsdale
Preceded by Pat McCarran	Chair of the Senate Judiciary Committee; 1953–1955	Succeeded by Harley M. Kilgore
