= North Dakota Attorney General =

Chief legal officer of the U.S. state of North Dakota

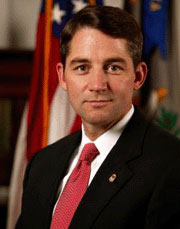
- Incumbent; Drew Wrigley since February 8, 2022
- Member of: North Dakota Industrial Commission
- Term length: Four years
- Formation: 1889
- First holder: George F. Goodwin
- Website: https://attorneygeneral.nd.gov

The North Dakota attorney general is the chief legal officer of the North Dakota state government. The attorney general's office represents the state government in court cases and issues opinions of points of law upon request. Drew Wrigley was appointed to the position on February 8, 2022, to finish the term of Wayne Stenehjem, who died in office.

== History ==
Since the creation of the office by the state's constitution in 1889, the state has seen a total of 28 attorneys general. The office has been known to change hands rather quickly. The office has been held by the North Dakota Republican Party for the bulk of its existence; only three of the 28 attorneys general were from the state's Democratic Party and two attorneys general ran on the Non Partisan League-ticket. The attorney general originally served a two-year term, but this was extended to four in 1964 by a constitutional amendment.

== Oversight ==
The Office of the Attorney General oversees the North Dakota Bureau of Criminal Investigation, the state crime laboratory, and the office of the state Fire Marshal. It is charged with enforcement of the state open meetings and open records laws. The attorney general is also responsible for gambling regulations (except horse betting), overseeing the state's lottery and charitable gaming, as well as the intergovernmental compacts related to Native American gaming within North Dakota.

== See also ==
- List of attorneys general of North Dakota
