= Daniel Johnston (North Dakota politician) =

American politician

Dan Johnston

Member of the North Dakota House of Representatives from the 24th district
- Incumbent
- Assumed office December 1, 2024
- Preceded by: Rose Christensen
- In office December 1, 2016 – December 1, 2020
- Preceded by: Naomi Muscha
- Succeeded by: Cole Christensen

Personal details
- Party: Republican
- Education: Liberty University (BA, MPA)

Daniel Johnston is a Republican member of the North Dakota House of Representatives and was first elected into office in 2016. He represents District 24. He lives in Kathryn. He has had 8 children with his wife Wendi.

Johnston sought the 2020 Republican nomination for North Dakota State Treasurer. He faced then fellow state representative Thomas Beadle at the 2020 Republican state convention, but the convention was canceled due to the ongoing COVID-19 pandemic. His candidacy was endorsed by ND Right to Life, North Dakotan's State Treasurer of 16 years, Kelly Schmidt, as well as high-profile endorsements from Senator Kevin Cramer and U.S. President Donald Trump. Johnston lost the June primary to Beadle.
