= Obert A. Olson =

North Dakotan politician (1882–1938)

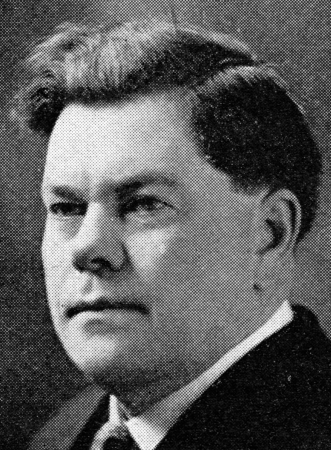

North Dakota State Treasurer
- In office 1919–1920
- Governor: Lynn Frazier
- Preceded by: John Steen
- Succeeded by: John Steen

Personal details
- Born: April 23, 1882 Rock Dell, Minnesota
- Died: August 22, 1938 (aged 56) Bismarck, North Dakota
- Party: Republican (NPL faction)
- Spouse: Mildred C. Gibson

Obert A. Olson (April 23, 1882 – August 22, 1938) was a North Dakota public servant and politician with the Republican Party (Nonpartisan League faction). Olson served as a state legislator (1917-1918, 1925–1928), State Treasurer (1919-1920), and mayor of Bismarck (1937-1938).

== Biography ==
=== Early life ===
Obert A. Olson was born on April 23, 1882, in Rock Dell, Minnesota. His parents were Halvor and Sophia (Swerig) Olson. He attended school in Minnesota and later the Southern Minnesota Normal College.

In October 1905, he moved to Bowman, North Dakota. He took up a homestead and became one of the first settlers of the area. He set up a farm and cattle operation and also started a real estate business in Bowman.

=== Early political career ===
Olson quickly become involved in local politics. Upon the organization of Bowman County, he served as its first auditor from 1907 to 1911. He served on the Bowman city commission from 1915 to 1916. In 1916, he was elected to the North Dakota House of Representatives, serving one term (1917-1918).

=== State treasurer ===
During the mid to late 1910s, Olson became involved with the Nonpartisan League (NPL). In 1918, he was endorsed by the NPL and elected State Treasurer. He served one term from 1919 to 1920.

Olson was a dedicated member of the NPL and its ideals. However, he began to disagree with some of the actions of the NPL's leaders. During the 1919 regular session of the state legislature, he spoke out against the newspaper and Board of Administration bills that were supported by the NPL. In a statement, Olson said, "I believe the printing bills and the board of administration bills should be referred. Neither of these measures has anything to do with the league program. They were 'wished upon us,' and I cannot see any good to be accomplished from their operation. I am for the league and its program, first, last and all the time, but I do not consider the schemes of this type, originating with one or two men, part of the league program, and I do not believe it will help the league to put them on our statute-books."

Olson also had a strained relationship with A. C. Townley, president of the NPL. Olson became president of the Farmers' Insurance Company, which had its home office in Dickinson. Townley viewed this organization and its activities as undermining the efforts of the NPL. Townley accused Olson of "using his public office to alienate the good will and certain support of the farmer," which Townley believed was rightfully due to the NPL. Olson shot back that "he would run his own business."

In October 1919, between the regular and special legislative sessions, there was talk of impeaching Olson for speaking out against the NPL. Olson was grouped in with the other "troublemakers," William Langer, Thomas Hall, and Carl Kositzky, who had openly defected from the NPL. No impeachment happened, but NPL leaders did block Olson's re-election attempt in 1920.

After his falling out, Olson distanced himself from the NPL. However, in a surprise move, or perhaps to make amends, the NPL endorsed Olson for state treasurer again in 1922. Olson lost to incumbent John Steen in the primary election.

=== Later political career ===
In 1924, Olson was elected to the North Dakota Senate, serving from 1925 to 1928. In 1937, Olson was elected mayor of Bismarck. However, he died in office one year later in August 1938.

== Personal life ==
On November 16, 1910, Olson married Mildred C. Gibson.

Olson was buried at Saint Mary's Cemetery in Burleigh County, North Dakota.

== Political offices ==
- 1907-1911: Auditor of Bowman County
- 1915-1916: Bowman City Commission
- 1917-1918: North Dakota House of Representatives
- 1918-1919: North Dakota State Treasurer
- 1925-1958: North Dakota Senate
- 1937-1938: Mayor of Bismarck

== See also ==
- List of North Dakota state treasurers

| Preceded by John Steen | North Dakota State Treasurer; 1919–1920 | Succeeded by John Steen |
