= Berta E. Baker =

American politician (1875–1964)

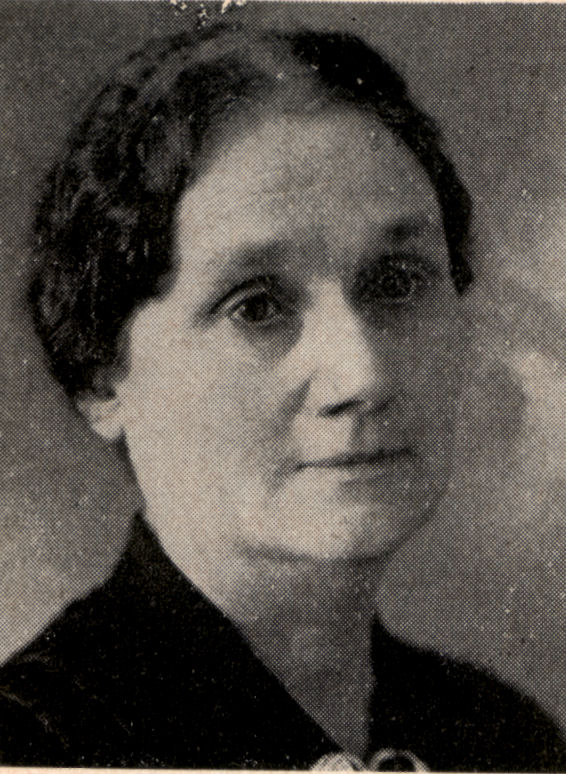
- Berta E. Baker

North Dakota State Treasurer
- In office 1929–1932
- Governor: George F. Shafer
- Preceded by: Chessmur A. Fischer
- Succeeded by: Alfred S. Dale

North Dakota State Auditor
- In office 1935–1956
- Governor: Thomas H. Moodie; Walter Welford; William Langer; John Moses; Fred G. Aandahl; Norman Brunsdale
- Preceded by: John Steen
- Succeeded by: Curtis G. Olson

Personal details
- Born: Elbertie Colcord; November 27, 1875 Sterling, Illinois
- Died: May 4, 1964 (aged 88) Minot, North Dakota
- Party: Republican

Elbertie "Berta" Colcord Baker (November 27, 1875 – May 4, 1964) was a North Dakota public servant and politician. She was the first woman to be nominated for statewide office in North Dakota. Baker served as the first female North Dakota State Treasurer from 1929 to 1932, and as the first female North Dakota State Auditor from 1935 to 1956. In total, she served in state office during seven different governors' administrations.

== Early life ==
Elbertie Colcord was born near Sterling, Illinois, in 1875, the daughter of William H. Colcord and Fianna Viola Linerode Colcord. Her father died in 1892. She moved to North Dakota in 1907. Her husband became a state senator there. After serving three years in the state senate, he died in an accident in 1924, at age 57.

== Career ==
Baker taught school in Illinois for five years. In 1928 she became the first woman nominated for statewide office in North Dakota. She was elected as the North Dakota State Treasurer in 1928, and was the first woman to hold that office, which she held for the maximum allowed term of four years. In 1931, she gave a radio address in support of farm cooperatives.

After her term as State Treasurer ended, Baker sought the office of North Dakota State Auditor, and won. She served in that capacity until 1956, when she retired at age 81.

As a state official she occasionally met with other states' officials. In 1929 she went to San Francisco for a meeting of the National Association of State Auditors, Comptrollers and Treasurers. In 1955 she was one of 18 women in government to attend a breakfast with President Dwight D. Eisenhower.

== Personal life ==
Colcord married Albert Francis "Bert" Baker in 1895. The Bakers moved to North Dakota in the spring of 1907 and settled on a farm in Renville County. They had four children. Her husband died in 1924. She died in 1964, at age 88, in Minot, North Dakota.

Party political offices
Preceded by John Steen	Republican nominee for North Dakota State Auditor; 1932, 1934, 1936, 1938, 1940, 1942, 1944, 1946, 1948, 1950, 1952, 1954	Succeeded by Curtis G. Olson
Political offices
Preceded by Chessmur A. Fischer	North Dakota State Treasurer; 1929–1932	Succeeded by Alfred S. Dale
Preceded by John Steen	North Dakota State Auditor; 1935–1956	Succeeded by Curtis G. Olson
