= Bob Petersen =

Bob Petersen may refer to:

- Robert Petersen (disambiguation)
- Bob Peterson (disambiguation)
