= 2026 North Dakota Attorney General election =

- November 3, 2026
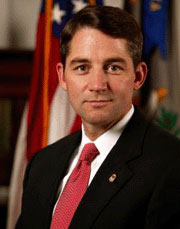

| Nominee | Drew Wrigley | Tim Lamb |
| Party | Republican | Democratic–NPL |
| Popular vote | 148,423 | 83,732 |
| Percentage | 63.9% | 36.1% |
Attorney General before election
Drew Wrigley
Republican
Elected Attorney General
Drew Wrigley
Republican

An election was held in the U.S. State of North Dakota on November 3, 2026 to elect the North Dakota Attorney General to a four-year term. A partisan primary election was held on June 9, 2026.

Incumbent Republican attorney general Drew Wrigley was re-elected to a second full term. He only faced write-in opposition in the Republican primary, and faced Democratic–NPL nominee Tim Lamb, who was also the nominee in 2022. Wrigley was first appointed in 2022 after the death of Wayne Stenehjem, and later elected to a full term later that year with 70.95 percent of the vote. North Dakota leans heavily Republican, with Republican presidential nominee Donald Trump winning the state with 66.96 percent of the vote in 2024.

This election took places alongside races for U.S. House, state house, state senate, and numerous other statewide and local offices.

== Republican primary ==
=== Nominee ===
- Drew Wrigley, incumbent attorney general

=== Endorsements ===
Declined to endorse

Political parties

- North Dakota Republican Party

=== Results ===
Republican primary results
| Party | Candidate | Votes | % |
|---|---|---|---|
| Republican | Drew Wrigley (incumbent) | 74,486 | 99.2 |
| Write-in | | 579 | 0.8 |
| Total votes | | 75,065 | 100.0 |

== Democratic–NPL primary ==
=== Nominee ===
- Tim Lamb, attorney from Grand Forks, nominee for auditor in 2024 and for attorney general in 2022

=== Endorsements ===
Tim Lamb

Political parties

- North Dakota Democratic–Nonpartisan League Party

=== Results ===
Democratic–NPL primary results
| Party | Candidate | Votes | % |
|---|---|---|---|
| Democratic–NPL | Tim Lamb | 33,913 | 99.7 |
| Write-in | | 108 | 0.3 |
| Total votes | | 34,021 | 100.0 |

== General election ==
=== Predictions ===
| Source | Ranking | As of |
|---|---|---|
| Sabato's Crystal Ball | Safe R | August 21, 2025 |
