= John Steen =

American politician (1874–1959)

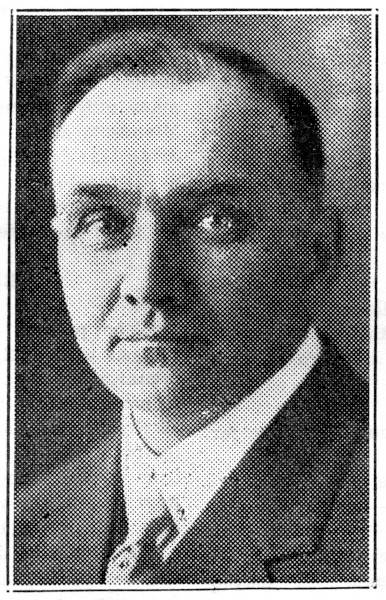

North Dakota State Treasurer
- In office 1915–1918
- Governor: L. B. Hanna
- Preceded by: Gunder Olson
- Succeeded by: Obert A. Olson
- In office 1921–1924
- Governor: Arthur G. Sorlie; Walter Maddock; George F. Shafer; William Langer
- Preceded by: Obert A. Olson
- Succeeded by: Chessmur A. Fischer

North Dakota State Auditor
- In office 1925–1934
- Governor: Arthur G. Sorlie; Walter Maddock; George F. Shafer; William Langer
- Preceded by: David C. Poindexter
- Succeeded by: Berta E. Baker

Personal details
- Born: July 28, 1874
- Died: August 21, 1959 (aged 85) Bismarck, North Dakota
- Party: Republican

John Steen (July 28, 1874 – August 21, 1959) was a North Dakota public servant and politician with the Republican Party. He served as the North Dakota State Treasurer from 1915 to 1918 and again from 1921 to 1924. He then served as the North Dakota State Auditor from 1925 to 1934. Prior to serving as Auditor and Treasurer, he was in the North Dakota House of Representatives from 1907 to 1910. He died in Bismarck in 1959 at age 85.

== Notes ==
Political offices
Preceded by Gunder Olson	North Dakota State Treasurer; 1915–1918	Succeeded by Obert A. Olson
Preceded by Obert A. Olson	North Dakota State Treasurer; 1921–1924	Succeeded by Chessmur A. Fischer
Preceded by David C. Poindexter	North Dakota State Auditor; 1925–1934	Succeeded by Berta E. Baker
