= List of North Dakota state auditors =

The following is a list of North Dakota state auditors. The office has always been on a party affiliated ballot, and was a two-year term office until 1964. Since then, state auditors have been elected to four-year terms.

State auditors by party affiliation
Party	Auditors
Republican	16
Democratic-Independent	1

#	Image	Name	Term	Party
1		John P. Bray	1889–1892	Republican
2		Archie Currie	1892	Republican
3		Arthur W. Porter	1893–1894	Democratic-Independent
4		Frank A. Briggs	1895–1896	Republican
5		Nathan B. Hannum	1897–1898	Republican
6		Albert N. Carlblom	1899–1902	Republican
7		Herbert L. Holmes	1903–1908	Republican
8		David K. Brightbill	1909–1912	Republican
9		Carl O. Jorgenson	1913–1916	Republican
10		Carl R. Kositzky	1917–1920	Republican/IVA
11		David C. Poindexter	1921–1924	Republican/NPL
12		John Steen	1925–1934	Republican
13		Berta E. Baker	1935–1956	Republican/NPL
14		Curtis G. Olson	1957–1972	Republican
15		Robert W. Peterson	1973–1996	Republican
16		Robert R. Peterson	1997–2016	Republican
17		Joshua C. Gallion	2017–present	Republican

== See also ==
- North Dakota State Auditor
