= Brightbill =

Brightbill is the americanised spelling of the Swiss German surname, Brechbühl or the variant Brächtbühl (see Brechbill). The Brightbill family name was found in the US, the UK, and Canada between 1840 and 1920. The most Brightbill families were found in the US in 1880. In 1891 there were 5 Brightbill families living in London. This was about 63% of all the recorded Brightbill's in the UK. London had the highest population of Brightbill families in 1891.

== Notable uses of the name ==
Notable people with the surname include:

- David Brightbill (disambiguation)
  - David J. Brightbill (1942–2025), member of the Pennsylvania State Senate
  - David K. Brightbill (1863–1949), North Dakota public servant and politician
- Kenny Brightbill (born 1948), American NASCAR and professional dirt modified driver
- Brightbill, a Canada goose in the 2024 animated film The Wild Robot
