= John Gray (North Dakota politician) =

American public servant and politician (1877–1952)

John A. Gray (August 5, 1877 – July 17, 1952) was a North Dakota public servant and politician .He served in two of the state's constitutional offices as the North Dakota State Treasurer from 1935 to 1938, and as the North Dakota Tax Commissioner from 1939 to 1952.

== Biography ==
John Gray was born on a farm in Hennepin County, Minnesota in 1877. He came to North Dakota in 1909, where he served as a master engineer in World War I. He was elected seven times as the County Auditor of Ransom County but he resigned that position to accept his appointment by the Governor to Deputy Tax Commissioner. He was then elected as the North Dakota State Treasurer in 1934, and served until term limitations prevented him from seeking re-election in 1938. He was then appointed as the Director of the Regulatory Department in January 1939, and served until May 1939 when he was appointed as the North Dakota Tax Commissioner. He was the last Tax Commissioner to be appointed; it became an elected position in 1940. He was re-elected continuously until 1952, when he died on July 17 at the age of 74.

== Notes ==
Party political offices
Preceded by Alfred S. Dale	Republican nominee for North Dakota State Treasurer; 1934, 1936	Succeeded by Carl Anderson
Political offices
Preceded by Alfred S. Dale	North Dakota State Treasurer; 1935–1938	Succeeded by John R. Omland
Preceded by Lee Nichols	Tax Commissioner of North Dakota; 1939–1952	Succeeded by Burtis B. Conyne
