= Robert Peterson =

Robert Peterson may refer to:

== Politics ==
- Robert Peterson (Canadian politician) (1937–2020), former Canadian Liberal senator from Saskatchewan
- Robert Peterson (South Dakota politician) (1888–1968), lieutenant governor of South Dakota
- Robert W. Peterson (politician) (1929–2013), North Dakota state auditor

== Sports ==
- Robert Peterson (footballer) (born 1952), former Australian rules footballer
- Buzz Peterson (Robert Bower Peterson Jr., born 1963), American basketball executive, former player and coach

== Writing ==
- Robert Peterson (poet) (1924–2000), American poet
- Robert Evans Peterson (1812–1894), American publisher and editor
- Robert W. Peterson (writer) (1925–2006), American sports writer

== Other ==
- Robert Peterson (art director) (1909–1979), American art director
- Robert O. Peterson (1916–1994), American businessman, founder of Jack in the Box

== See also ==
- Bob Peterson (disambiguation)
- Robert Petersen (disambiguation)
