= Randy Schobinger =

American politician (1969–2024)

Member of the North Dakota House of Representatives from the 40th district
- In office December 1, 2016 – August 13, 2024 Serving with Matthew Ruby
- Preceded by: Matthew Klein
- Succeeded by: Clara Sue Price

Member of the North Dakota Senate from the 3rd district
- In office 1995–2006

Personal details
- Born: December 15, 1969 Minot, North Dakota, U.S.
- Died: August 13, 2024 (aged 54) Delano, Tennessee, U.S.
- Party: Republican
- Education: Minot State University (BS)

Randy A. Schobinger (December 15, 1969 – August 13, 2024) was an American politician who served as a member of the North Dakota House of Representatives from the 40th district from 2016 until his death in 2024. Elected in November 2016, he assumed office on December 1, 2016.

== Early life and education ==
Schobinger was born in Minot, North Dakota, on December 15, 1969. Raised there, he earned a Bachelor of Science degree in economics from Minot State University.

== Career ==
Outside of politics, Schobinger worked in the insurance industry. He was a candidate for North Dakota state treasurer in 2000, losing narrowly to Kathi Gilmore. He served as a member of the North Dakota Senate from 1995 to 2006. He was elected to the North Dakota House of Representatives in November 2016 and assumed office on December 1, 2016.

== Personal life and death ==
Schobinger was married to Jenny Sauer at the time of his death. He died of cancer in Delano, Tennessee, on August 13, 2024, at age 54.

Party political offices
Preceded by Claus H. Lembke	Republican nominee for North Dakota State Treasurer; 1996, 2000	Succeeded by Kelly Schmidt
