= 2024 North Dakota State Treasurer election =

- November 5, 2024
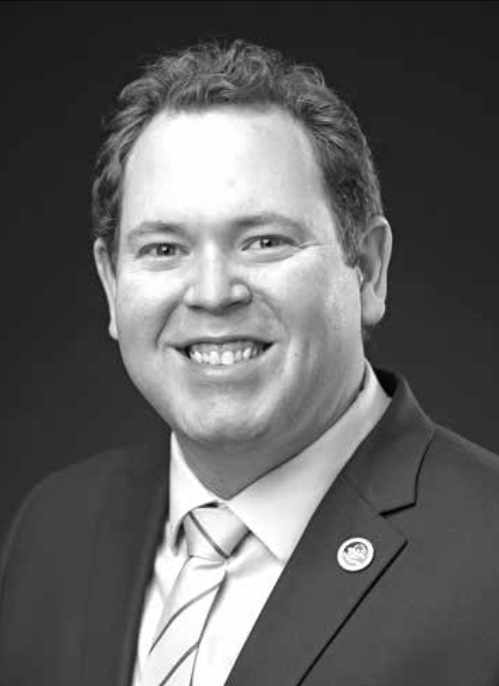
Nominee	Thomas Beadle
Party	Republican
Popular vote	303,730
Percentage	98.08%
- County results Beadle: >90%
State Treasurer before election
Thomas Beadle
Republican
Elected State Treasurer
Thomas Beadle
Republican

The 2024 North Dakota State Treasurer election took place on November 5, 2024, to elect the next state treasurer of North Dakota. Incumbent Republican treasurer Thomas Beadle won a second term unopposed. Primary elections took place on June 11, 2024.

== Republican primary ==
=== Candidates ===
==== Nominee ====
- Thomas Beadle, incumbent state treasurer

=== Results ===
Republican primary results
Party	Candidate	Votes	%
Republican	Thomas Beadle (incumbent)	81,014	99.51%
Write-in		403	0.49%
Total votes		81,417	100.00%

== General election ==
County Flips: Republican Hold Flip

=== Results ===
2024 North Dakota State Treasurer election
Party	Candidate	Votes	%	±%
Republican	Thomas Beadle (incumbent)	303,730	98.08%	+32.48%
Write-in		5,952	1.92%	+1.48%
Total votes		309,682	100.00%	N/A
Republican hold				

==== By county ====
County	Thomas Beadle Republican		Write-ins	
County	#	%	#	%
Adams	1,068	99.72%	3	0.28%
Barnes	4,465	98.65%	61	1.35%
Benson	1,535	97.65%	37	2.35%
Billings	586	99.83%	1	0.17%
Bottineau	2,999	99.17%	25	0.83%
Bowman	1,502	99.67%	5	0.33%
Burke	963	99.48%	5	0.52%
Burleigh	43,593	98.31%	748	1.69%
Cass	72,821	96.53%	2,617	3.47%
Cavalier	1,647	99.46%	9	0.54%
Dickey	2,144	99.03%	21	0.97%
Divide	1,030	99.42%	6	0.58%
Dunn	1,964	98.89%	22	1.11%
Eddy	1,045	99.52%	5	0.48%
Emmons	1,670	99.46%	9	0.54%
Foster	1,477	99.06%	14	0.94%
Golden Valley	878	99.32%	6	0.68%
Grand Forks	24,173	97.71%	566	2.29%
Grant	1,154	99.06%	11	0.94%
Griggs	1,091	99.27%	8	0.73%
Hettinger	1,160	99.32%	8	0.68%
Kidder	1,235	99.44%	7	0.56%
LaMoure	1,834	99.30%	13	0.70%
Logan	898	99.45%	5	0.55%
McHenry	2,417	99.42%	14	0.58%
McIntosh	1,219	99.59%	5	0.41%
McKenzie	4,872	98.80%	59	1.20%
McLean	4,655	98.73%	60	1.27%
Mercer	3,961	99.40%	24	0.60%
Morton	13,876	98.95%	147	1.05%
Mountrail	3,416	98.02%	69	1.98%
Nelson	1,459	98.65%	20	1.35%
Oliver	957	99.38%	6	0.62%
Pembina	2,689	99.12%	24	0.88%
Pierce	1,752	99.43%	10	0.57%
Ramsey	4,378	98.83%	52	1.17%
Ransom	2,207	98.35%	37	1.65%
Renville	1,109	99.28%	8	0.72%
Richland	6,955	98.82%	83	1.18%
Rolette	2,827	96.09%	115	3.91%
Sargent	1,646	98.74%	21	1.26%
Sheridan	674	98.97%	7	1.03%
Sioux	636	90.60%	66	9.40%
Slope	356	99.44%	2	0.56%
Stark	13,014	98.82%	156	1.18%
Steele	835	98.35%	14	1.65%
Stutsman	7,725	99.32%	53	0.68%
Towner	937	99.79%	2	0.21%
Traill	3,443	99.02%	34	0.98%
Walsh	3,822	99.02%	38	0.98%
Ward	23,984	98.05%	478	1.95%
Wells	1,995	99.16%	17	0.84%
Williams	12,982	99.09%	119	0.91%
Totals	303,730	98.08%	5,952	1.92%

Counties that flipped from Democratic to Republican

- Sioux (Largest CDP: Cannon Ball)
- Rolette (largest CDP: Belcourt)
