= Albert N. Carlblom =

American politician

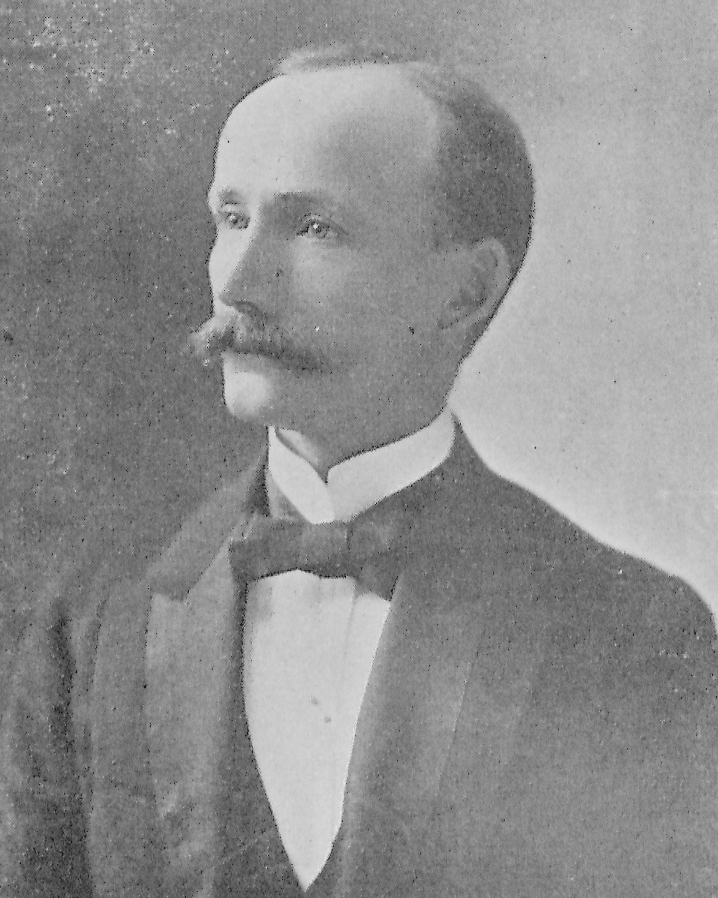

6th State Auditor of North Dakota
- In office 1899–1902
- Preceded by: Nathan B. Hannum
- Succeeded by: Herbert L. Holmes

Personal details
- Born: Albert N. Carlblom; December 17, 1865 Cokato, Minnesota, U.S.
- Died: June 15, 1920 (aged 54) Breckenridge, Minnesota, U.S.
- Party: Republican
- Spouse: Josephine Peterson (m. 1891)
- Education: Gustavus Adolphus College

Albert N. Carlblom (December 17, 1865 – June 15, 1920) was a North Dakota (United States) public servant and politician with the Republican Party who served as the North Dakota State Auditor from 1899 to 1902.

== Biography ==
Albert Carlblom was born in Cokato, Minnesota on December 17, 1865. He was the son of John G. and Elizabeth Anderson Carlblom, both natives of Sweden.

He graduated from Gustavus Adolphus College in 1886. He moved to North Dakota in 1891. Following several years of teaching and terms of public office in Sargent County, North Dakota, he married Josephine Peterson in 1898.

A year later he became North Dakota State Auditor. After serving two terms as State Auditor, he did not seek re-election to the office in 1902. Instead he chose to return to the prairie and operate the first building constructed in Gwinner, North Dakota. He also joined others in the organizing of the Gwinner State Bank and served as its president.

On June 15, 1920, he died at a hospital in Breckenridge from injuries incurred from a cyclone. He had three children: Vera Lenore Carlblom, Edna Carlblom Howell, and Albert Carlblom.

== See also ==
- List of North Dakota state auditors

Political offices
Preceded by Nathan B. Hannum	North Dakota State Auditor; 1899–1902	Succeeded by Herbert L. Holmes
