= David C. Poindexter =

American public servant and politician

- David C. Poindexter, circa 1922

11th North Dakota State Auditor
- In office 1921–1924
- Preceded by: Carl R. Kositzky
- Succeeded by: John Steen

Personal details
- Born: December 21, 1891 Saint Paul, Minnesota
- Died: March 15, 1927 (aged 35) Jamestown, North Dakota
- Party: Republican
- Spouse: Marjorie MacLachlan

David C. Poindexter (December 21, 1891 – March 15, 1927) was a North Dakota public servant and politician with the Republican Party who served as the North Dakota State Auditor from 1921 to 1924.

== Biography ==
=== Early years and education ===
David Charles Poindexter was born in 1891 in St. Paul, Minnesota, to parents Reuben and Ella (Fisher) Poindexter. By 1900, the family had moved to Jamestown, North Dakota, where Reuben and Ella had previously resided.

Poindexter was educated in Jamestown. After school, he worked for the Northern Pacific Railroad for several years and resided in Sterling.

=== Military ===
Poindexter enlisted in the Army in Bismarck, North Dakota, in December 1917, and he served in aerial squadrons. He was sent to Missouri until April 1918. He was then stationed in Dallas, Texas, until his discharge in January 1919.

=== State Auditor ===
In 1920, after cutting ties with the incumbent State Auditor, Carl R. Kositzky, the Nonpartisan League (NPL) endorsed Poindexter. Poindexter defeated Kositzky in the Republican Primary in June 1920. Kositzky secured the Democratic nomination and challenged Poindexter again in the general election. Poindexter won the election in November 1920, becoming the new State Auditor. He was re-elected in 1922.

Poindexter, endorsed by the Farmer-Labor Party, was defeated in the 1924 election by John Steen, and he did not run again for the office.

=== State Hospital ===
After leaving office, Poindexter worked for the railroad again. In some NPL circles, it was rumored that he was being considered for the Workmen's Compensation Bureau. Instead, in April 1925, Poindexter was appointed to a prominent role at the North Dakota State Hospital in Jamestown.

=== Death ===
In March 1927, Poindexter fell ill with influenza, which culminated in pneumonia. He succumbed after battling the illness for five days. He died in Jamestown on March 15, 1927.

== Personal life ==
Poindexter was named after his paternal grandfather, David Winslow Poindexter. His grandfather, a resident of South Dakota, served in the Dakota Territory Council in 1889.

Poindexter married Marjorie MacLachlan on October 4, 1926.

Political offices
| Preceded by Carl R. Kositzky | North Dakota State Auditor; 1921–1924 | Succeeded by John Steen |
