= John S. Lesmeister =

American politician

- Born: John Steven Lesmeister; October 3, 1955; Dickinson, North Dakota, United States
- Died: February 28, 2006 (aged 50); Fargo, North Dakota, United States
- Resting place: St. Mary's Cemetery, Bismarck, North Dakota, United States; 46°48′53.24″N 100°45′22.00″W
- Occupation(s): Politician, college admissions counselor, real estate agent, hospital aide, substitute teacher
- Spouse: Cindy Ulm (1982 - unknown)

John Steven Lesmeister (October 3, 1955 – February 28, 2006) was a North Dakota politician who served as the 30th North Dakota State Treasurer from 1981 to 1984.

== Biography ==
Lesmeister was born in Dickinson, North Dakota, and grew up in Halliday, North Dakota, where he was graduated from high school in 1973.

After earning a history and English degree four years later from the University of Mary in Bismarck, North Dakota, he sold real estate and was Mary's admissions coordinator before he ran for state treasurer. He won the Republican endorsement in 1980 at age 25.

A Republican, Lesmeister was elected state treasurer in 1980, narrowly defeating incumbent Democrat Bob Hanson. Hanson ran against Lesmeister four years later and ousted him in another close race.

After the loss, Lesmeister ran unsuccessfully for state labor commissioner in 1986—it was an elected office at the time—and briefly sought Republican support two years later to run for secretary of state.

He moved to Fargo, North Dakota, in 1990, where he worked at Innovis Health and as a substitute teacher.

Lesmeister died in Fargo, North Dakota, on February 28, 2006, of natural causes.

Party political offices
Preceded by Bernice Asbridge	Republican nominee for North Dakota State Treasurer; 1980, 1984	Succeeded by Steve Easton
Political offices
Preceded by Robert E. Hanson	North Dakota State Treasurer; 1981–1984	Succeeded by Robert E. Hanson
