= Curtis G. Olson =

American public servant and politician

North Dakota State Auditor
- In office 1957–1972
- Governor: John E. Davis; William L. Guy
- Preceded by: Berta E. Baker
- Succeeded by: Robert W. Peterson

Personal details
- Born: March 26, 1908
- Died: October 15, 2004 (aged 96) Valley City, North Dakota
- Party: Republican

Curtis George Norval Olson (March 26, 1908 – October 15, 2004) was a North Dakota public servant and politician with the Republican Party who served as the North Dakota State Auditor from 1957 to 1972. Prior to serving as Auditor, he was in the North Dakota House of Representatives from 1941 to 1946. His death at the age of 96 in 2004 made him the second longest-lived statewide official ever to serve the state, behind Robert S. Lewis.

== Notes ==
Party political offices
Preceded by Berta E. Baker	Republican nominee for North Dakota State Auditor; 1956, 1958, 1960, 1962, 1964, 1968	Succeeded by Robert W. Peterson
Political offices
Preceded by Berta E. Baker	North Dakota State Auditor; 1957–1972	Succeeded by Robert W. Peterson
