= Robert E. Hanson =

American politician

29th and 31st North Dakota State Treasurer
- In office 1979–1980; 1985–1992
- Governor: Arthur A. Link; George A. Sinner
- Preceded by: Walter Christensen
- Succeeded by: Kathi Gilmore

21st Tax Commissioner of North Dakota
- In office 1993–1996
- Governor: Ed Schafer
- Preceded by: Heidi Heitkamp
- Succeeded by: Rick Clayburgh

Personal details
- Born: August 26, 1947 Jamestown, North Dakota
- Died: February 4, 2015 (aged 67) Fargo, North Dakota
- Party: Democratic-NPL
- Spouse: Dee Hanson
- Children: Kristen Hanson; Jason Austad; Jamie Austad
- Parent(s): Louis J Hanson; Kathlene A Hanson
- Education: North Dakota State University

Robert E. Hanson (August 26, 1947 – February 4, 2015) was a North Dakota Democratic-NPL politician who served as the North Dakota State Treasurer from 1979 to 1980 and from 1985 to 1992 and as North Dakota Tax Commissioner from 1993 to 1996.

== Background ==
Born in Jamestown, North Dakota, Hanson served in the United States Army during the Vietnam War and then received his bachelor's degree from North Dakota State University. He died in Fargo, North Dakota.

Party political offices
Preceded by Walter Christensen	Democratic nominee for North Dakota State Treasurer; 1980, 1984, 1988	Succeeded by Kathi Gilmore
Preceded by Heidi Heitkamp	Democratic nominee for Tax Commissioner of North Dakota; 1992, 1996	Succeeded by Steve Tomac
Political offices
Preceded by Walter Christensen	North Dakota State Treasurer; 1979–1980	Succeeded by John S. Lesmeister
Preceded by John S. Lesmeister	North Dakota State Treasurer; 1985–1992	Succeeded by Kathi Gilmore
Preceded by Heidi Heitkamp	Tax Commissioner of North Dakota; 1993–1996	Succeeded by Rick Clayburgh
