= Frank A. Briggs =

American politician and 5th governor of North Dakota

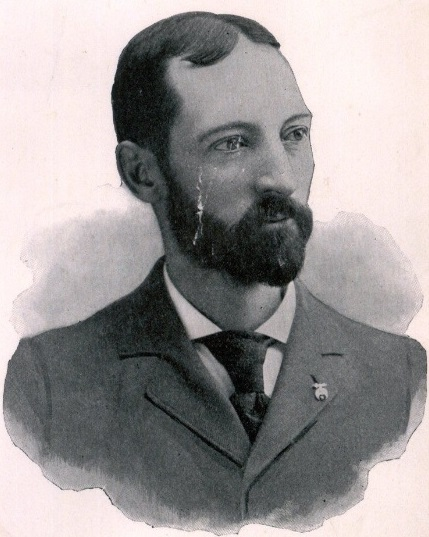
- From the 1897 atlas North Dakota and Richland County Chart

5th Governor of North Dakota
- In office January 6, 1897 – August 9, 1898
- Lieutenant: Joseph M. Devine
- Preceded by: Roger Allin
- Succeeded by: Joseph M. Devine

Auditor of North Dakota
- In office 1895–1896
- Governor: Roger Allin
- Preceded by: Arthur W. Porter
- Succeeded by: Nathan B. Hannum

Personal details
- Born: September 15, 1858 Minneapolis, Minnesota, U.S.
- Died: August 9, 1898 (aged 39) Bismarck, North Dakota, U.S.
- Party: Republican
- Spouse: Nannie Rachel Meek
- Children: 2
- Profession: Politician

Frank Arlington Briggs (September 15, 1858 – August 9, 1898) was an American Republican elected official who served as the fifth governor of North Dakota from January 6, 1897 until his death nineteen months later.

== Biography ==
Frank A. Briggs was born in the town of Minneapolis, Minnesota, and was variously employed as a printer and journalist. He married Nannie Rachel Meek on July 12, 1877 and they had two daughters, Stella and Bessie. Twenty-three years old in 1881, he moved to the city of Mandan, the county seat of North Dakota's Morton County, where he dealt in real estate. At that time the area was still Dakota Territory.

== Career ==
Campaigning for public office, he was elected county treasurer, serving from 1885 to 1887, gained the statewide post of auditor in 1894 and, finally, in November 1896, prevailed in the gubernatorial election. An activist executive, he participated in discussions of laws being drafted by the state legislature, including passage of the revenue bill as well as a general railway law which regulated movement of freight and passengers.

== Death ==
Having struggled with tuberculosis, Governor Briggs lost the battle in Bismarck five weeks before his 40th birthday. Lieutenant Governor Joseph M. Devine served the remaining four-and-a-half months of the governor's two-year term. He was buried in Howard Lake Cemetery, Howard Lake, MN. Briggs was the first North Dakota Governor to die while in office.

== See also ==
- Governor of North Dakota
- List of governors of North Dakota

== Sources ==
- Frank A. Briggs Papers at the State Historical Society of North Dakota (File no. 20914): scrapbook contains death notices and obituaries for the governor from various newspapers in North Dakota and the United States. Among the contents are eulogies, a description of Briggs' nomination for governor in 1896, copies of campaign speeches and details of his inaugural ceremony, as well as notices of the death of his daughter which occurred in Minnesota, buried at Howard Lake, MN, while he was in Bismarck, taking the oath of office. Included are newspaper clippings describing the Republican convention in 1894 when Briggs was nominated for State Auditor, followed by clippings about that campaign. There are also letters of recommendation about Briggs' ability as a printer, a picture of the Briggs cemetery monument in Howard Lake, MN, Wright County, in the governor's native Minnesota, where he was buried. Appended are social notes concerning Mrs. Briggs' life in Bismarck after the governor's death and a marriage announcement of her 1905 remarriage.

Party political offices
Preceded by Roger Allin	Republican nominee for Governor of North Dakota; 1896	Succeeded by Frederick B. Fancher
Political offices
Preceded by Arthur W. Porter	North Dakota State Auditor; 1895–1896	Succeeded by Nathan B. Hannum
Preceded by Roger Allin	Governor of North Dakota; 1897–1898	Succeeded by Joseph M. Devine
