= 2024 North Dakota State Auditor election =

- November 5, 2024
Nominee	Josh Gallion	Timothy Lamb
Party	Republican	Democratic–NPL
Popular vote	241,270	108,962
Percentage	68.74%	31.04%
- Gallion: 50–60% 60–70% 70–80% 80–90% >90% Lamb: 50–60% 60–70% 70–80% 80–90% >90% No votes
State Auditor before election
Josh Gallion
Republican
Elected State Auditor
Josh Gallion
Republican

The 2024 North Dakota State Auditor election was held on November 5, 2024, to elect the North Dakota state auditor. Primary elections took place on June 11, 2024. In the general contest, Republican incumbent Josh Gallion was handily re-elected for a third term, defeating Democratic–NPL candidate Timothy Lamb.

== Republican primary ==
=== Candidates ===
==== Nominee ====
- Josh Gallion, incumbent state auditor

=== Results ===
Republican primary results
Party	Candidate	Votes	%
Republican	Josh Gallion (incumbent)	81,069	99.24%
Write-in		617	0.76%
Total votes		81,686	100.00%

== Democratic-NPL primary ==
=== Candidates ===
==== Nominee ====
- Timothy Lamb, lawyer and nominee for attorney general in 2022

=== Results ===
Democratic–NPL primary results
Party	Candidate	Votes	%
Democratic–NPL	Timothy Lamb	18,987	99.76%
Write-in		45	0.24%
Total votes		19,032	100.00%

== General election ==
=== Results ===
2024 North Dakota State Auditor election
Party	Candidate	Votes	%
Republican	Josh Gallion (incumbent)	241,270	68.74%
Democratic–NPL	Timothy Lamb	108,962	31.04%
Write-in		761	0.22%
Total votes		350,993	100.00%
Republican hold			

==== By county ====
County	Josh Gallion Republican		Timothy Lamb Democratic-NPL		Write-in Various		Margin		Total
County	#	%	#	%	#	%	#	%	Total
Adams	932	79.45%	240	20.46%	1	0.09%	692	58.99%	1,173
Barnes	3,417	66.76%	1,696	33.14%	5	0.10%	1,721	33.63%	5,118
Benson	1,122	58.99%	778	40.90%	2	0.11%	344	18.09%	1,902
Billings	526	82.70%	107	16.82%	3	0.47%	419	65.88%	636
Bottineau	2,563	76.64%	776	23.21%	5	0.15%	1,787	53.44%	3,344
Bowman	1,342	85.21%	230	14.60%	3	0.19%	1,112	70.60%	1,575
Burke	889	86.82%	134	13.09%	1	0.10%	755	73.73%	1,024
Burleigh	36,362	73.09%	13,220	26.57%	167	0.34%	23,142	46.52%	49,749
Cass	48,704	55.96%	38,124	43.81%	203	0.23%	10,580	12.16%	87,031
Cavalier	1,418	74.75%	476	25.09%	3	0.16%	942	49.66%	1,897
Dickey	1,788	75.67%	575	24.33%	0	0.00%	1,213	51.33%	2,363
Divide	902	78.37%	249	21.63%	0	0.00%	653	56.73%	1,151
Dunn	1,795	83.64%	348	16.22%	3	0.14%	1,447	67.43%	2,146
Eddy	846	72.12%	327	27.88%	0	0.00%	519	44.25%	1,173
Emmons	1,602	87.78%	220	12.05%	3	0.16%	1,382	75.73%	1,825
Foster	1,290	78.37%	353	21.45%	3	0.18%	937	56.93%	1,646
Golden Valley	800	84.30%	149	15.70%	0	0.00%	651	68.60%	949
Grand Forks	17,767	60.24%	11,654	39.51%	75	0.25%	6,113	20.72%	29,496
Grant	1,095	84.69%	196	15.16%	2	0.15%	899	69.53%	1,293
Griggs	945	76.64%	286	23.20%	2	0.16%	659	53.45%	1,233
Hettinger	1,051	84.08%	199	15.92%	0	0.00%	852	68.16%	1,250
Kidder	1,118	82.39%	238	17.54%	1	0.07%	880	64.85%	1,357
LaMoure	1,551	75.33%	508	24.67%	0	0.00%	1,043	50.66%	2,059
Logan	846	85.98%	137	13.92%	1	0.10%	709	72.05%	984
McHenry	2,129	79.83%	535	20.06%	3	0.11%	1,594	59.77%	2,667
McIntosh	1,096	81.97%	240	17.95%	1	0.07%	856	64.02%	1,337
McKenzie	4,448	84.24%	816	15.45%	16	0.30%	3,632	68.79%	5,280
McLean	4,121	78.42%	1,126	21.43%	8	0.15%	2,995	56.99%	5,255
Mercer	3,645	83.35%	724	16.56%	4	0.09%	2,921	66.80%	4,373
Morton	12,063	75.79%	3,815	23.97%	38	0.24%	8,248	51.82%	15,916
Mountrail	2,761	70.13%	1,170	29.72%	6	0.15%	1,591	40.41%	3,937
Nelson	1,076	63.44%	620	36.56%	0	0.00%	456	26.89%	1,696
Oliver	878	83.86%	167	15.95%	2	0.19%	711	67.91%	1,047
Pembina	2,305	76.43%	709	23.51%	2	0.07%	1,596	52.92%	3,016
Pierce	1,477	76.89%	441	22.96%	3	0.16%	1,036	53.93%	1,921
Ramsey	3,489	69.10%	1,551	30.72%	9	0.18%	1,938	38.38%	5,049
Ransom	1,565	61.88%	961	38.00%	3	0.12%	604	23.88%	2,529
Renville	972	82.37%	207	17.54%	1	0.08%	765	64.83%	1,180
Richland	5,372	68.35%	2,477	31.52%	10	0.13%	2,895	36.84%	7,859
Rolette	1,293	33.14%	2,606	66.79%	3	0.08%	-1,313	-33.65%	3,902
Sargent	1,207	61.24%	753	38.20%	11	0.56%	454	23.03%	1,971
Sheridan	621	84.95%	107	14.64%	3	0.41%	514	70.31%	731
Sioux	293	31.27%	643	68.62%	1	0.11%	-350	-37.35%	937
Slope	347	90.36%	37	9.64%	0	0.78%	310	80.73%	384
Stark	11,901	82.70%	2,454	17.05%	35	0.24%	9,447	65.65%	14,390
Steele	619	63.29%	358	36.61%	1	0.10%	261	26.69%	978
Stutsman	6,588	71.59%	2,605	28.31%	9	0.10%	3,983	43.28%	9,202
Towner	764	71.27%	308	28.73%	0	0.00%	456	42.54%	1,072
Traill	2,583	65.86%	1,330	33.91%	9	0.23%	1,253	31.95%	3,922
Walsh	3,109	71.24%	1,250	28.64%	5	0.11%	1,859	42.60%	4,364
Ward	20,133	73.75%	7,109	26.04%	58	0.21%	13,024	47.71%	27,300
Wells	1,761	81.23%	405	18.68%	2	0.09%	1,356	62.55%	2,168
Williams	11,983	84.17%	2,218	15.58%	35	0.25%	9,765	68.59%	14,236
Totals	241,270	68.74%	108,962	31.04%	761	0.22%	132,308	37.70%	350,993
