= Carl O. Jorgenson =

American public servant and politician

Carl O. Jorgenson

Carl O. Jorgenson (June 6, 1881 – October 19, 1951) was a North Dakota public servant and politician with the Republican Party who served as the North Dakota State Auditor from 1913 to 1916. After serving two terms, he was defeated in the 1916 Republican Primary and therefore did not run again for the office.

== Biography ==
Carl Jorgenson was born in Willmar, Minnesota. He was one of three children born to Ole B. Jorgenson and Jennie (Olson) Jorgenson, both of whom were immigrants from Norway. He came to Milnor, North Dakota with his parents in 1885. He was educated at Milnor High School, and later took courses at a business college in Minneapolis, Minnesota. He served in various capacities in the office of the Auditor beginning in 1901, and was elected to the position of State Auditor in 1912. He served until he lost his party's primary in 1916. He died at the age of 70 in Fargo, North Dakota. He was buried at the Milnor Lutheran Cemetery in Sargent County, North Dakota.

Political offices
Preceded by David K. Brightbill	North Dakota State Auditor; 1913–1916	Succeeded by Carl R. Kositzky
