= Nathan B. Hannum =

American politician

Nathan B. Hannum (c. 1851–1920) was a North Dakota public servant and politician with the Republican Party who served as the North Dakota State Auditor from 1897 to 1898. After serving just one term, he did not seek re-election to the office in 1898.

== Notes ==
Political offices
Preceded by Frank A. Briggs	North Dakota State Auditor; 1897–1898	Succeeded by Albert N. Carlblom
