= Herbert L. Holmes =

American politician (1853–1922)

Herbert L. Holmes (May 29, 1853 – August 31, 1922) was a North Dakota public servant and politician with the Republican Party who served as the North Dakota State Auditor from 1903 to 1908. After serving three terms, he did not seek re-election to the office in 1908.

== Notes ==
Political offices
Preceded by Albert N. Carlblom	North Dakota State Auditor; 1903–1908	Succeeded by David K. Brightbill
