= Gunder Olson =

North Dakota public servant and politician with the Republican Party

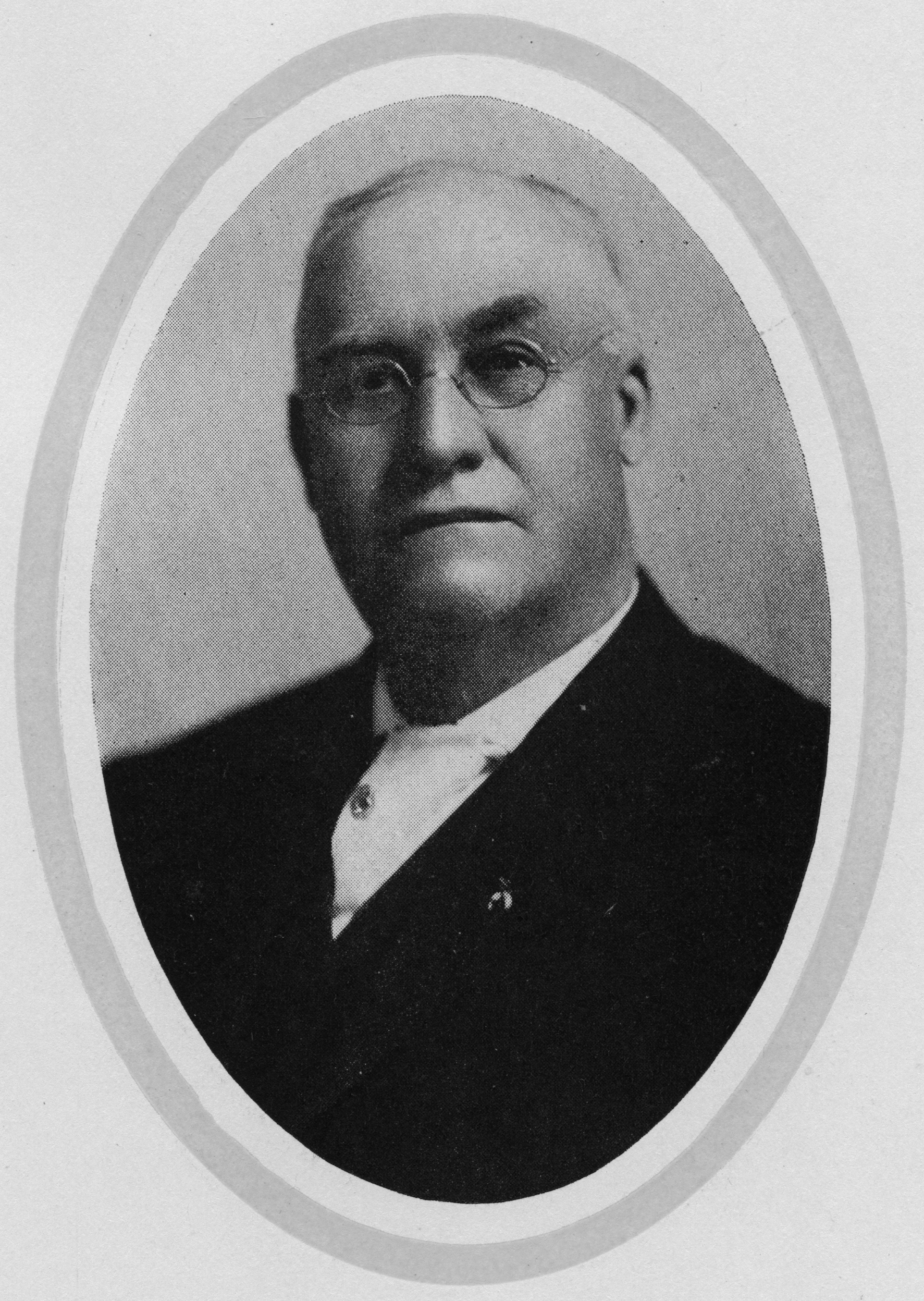

8th North Dakota State Treasurer
- In office 1911–1914
- Preceded by: George L. Bickford
- Succeeded by: John Steen

Personal details
- Born: September 10, 1852 Norway
- Died: December 11, 1948 (aged 96) Cass County, North Dakota, US
- Party: Republican
- Spouse: Ann (Gullickson) Olson

Gunder Olson (September 8, 1852 – December 11, 1948) was a North Dakota public servant and politician with the Republican Party.

== Biography ==
Gunder Olson was born in the county of Telemark, Norway. He came to America with his parents when he was only one year old, and his family located in Winneshiek County, Iowa. He came to North Dakota in 1881 and worked as a merchant. He served as the sheriff of Walsh County, North Dakota from 1884 to 1888. He also served as the president of the North Dakota Board of the Blind Asylum in Bathgate, now the North Dakota School for the Blind, in Grand Forks, North Dakota.

Olson was elected as the North Dakota State Treasurer in 1910 and served until 1914. He did not seek re-election to another term since Treasurers were not permitted to serve more than two consecutive terms.

== Personal life ==
Gunder Olson was married and had two daughters. Olson died at the age of 96 in 1948.

== See also ==
- North Dakota State Treasurer
- List of North Dakota state treasurers

Preceded by George L. Bickford	North Dakota State Treasurer; 1911–1914	Succeeded by John Steen
