= Drew Wrigley =

Attorney General of North Dakota since 2022

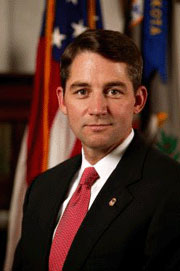

30th Attorney General of North Dakota
- Incumbent
- Assumed office February 8, 2022
- Governor: Doug Burgum; Kelly Armstrong
- Preceded by: Wayne Stenehjem

United States Attorney for the District of North Dakota
- In office April 17, 2019 – February 28, 2021
- President: Donald Trump; Joe Biden
- Preceded by: Tim Purdon
- Succeeded by: Mac Schneider
- In office November 6, 2001 – September 11, 2009
- President: George W. Bush; Barack Obama
- Preceded by: John Schneider
- Succeeded by: Tim Purdon

37th Lieutenant Governor of North Dakota
- In office December 7, 2010 – December 15, 2016
- Governor: Jack Dalrymple
- Preceded by: Jack Dalrymple
- Succeeded by: Brent Sanford

Personal details
- Born: Drew Howard Wrigley; October 10, 1965 (age 61) Bismarck, North Dakota, U.S.
- Party: Republican
- Spouse: Kathleen (married 1998, divorced 2025)
- Education: University of North Dakota (BA); American University (JD)
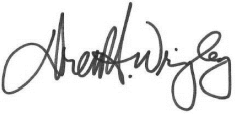
- Signature

Drew Howard Wrigley (born October 10, 1965) is an American lawyer and politician serving as the attorney general of North Dakota since 2022. Wrigley, already running for the office, was appointed by Governor Doug Burgum when incumbent Wayne Stenehjem died unexpectedly. Wrigley was elected to a full four-year term in November 2022, garnering 71% of the vote. Wrigley previously served as the United States attorney for the District of North Dakota from 2001 to 2009 and again from 2019 to 2021, appointed by Presidents George W. Bush and Donald Trump, respectively. Between his terms as United States attorney, Wrigley served as the 37th lieutenant governor of North Dakota from 2010 to 2016.

Wrigley was the deputy chief of staff to then-Governor John Hoeven prior to serving in elected office.

== Education and early career ==
A native of Bismarck, North Dakota, Wrigley grew up in Fargo, North Dakota, where he graduated from Fargo South High School. He is a fourth-generation North Dakotan, with roots in Burke County and Walsh County. Wrigley is an honors graduate of the University of North Dakota in Grand Forks, North Dakota, where he graduated cum laude with a Bachelor of Arts degree in economics and a minor in philosophy. Wrigley was an active member of Phi Delta Theta during college. He completed his Juris Doctor at the Washington College of Law of American University in Washington, D.C., where he was active in student government, mentoring programs, and he interned for U.S. senator Bob Dole.

== Career ==
After law school, Wrigley served as a judicial law clerk in Delaware, after which he became an assistant district attorney in Philadelphia, serving in that capacity for five years before returning to North Dakota.

=== U.S. attorney ===
In 2001, President George W. Bush appointed Wrigley to be the United States attorney for North Dakota. He was unanimously confirmed by the United States Senate.

Wrigley's most notable case was the Dru Sjodin kidnapping and murder. Capital punishment was abolished in the state of North Dakota in 1973, but because the crime involved crossing state lines, the trial fell under jurisdiction of the federal government, leaving the decision about whether or not to seek the death penalty up to Wrigley, who chose to request the death penalty. He personally handled the case and successfully prosecuted Alfonso Rodriguez, a repeat sex offender from Crookston, Minnesota, for the kidnap, rape, and murder of Sjodin (he was sentenced to death on September 22, 2006).

A February 9, 2007, article in the New York Times stated that according to a transcript of the court proceedings, Judge Ralph R. Erickson, who imposed the sentence, said "This is the first time since 1914 that any judge has been confronted with a death penalty sentence in North Dakota or Minnesota...Mr. Rodriguez's senseless and horrendous" act forced an uncomfortable discussion of capital punishment to the forefront. In addition to personally leading the trial team in the trial that lead to Rodriguez's death sentence, Wrigley successfully argued the case before the Eighth Circuit Court of Appeals, which upheld Rodriguez's conviction and death sentence. The United States Supreme Court later denied the Rodriguez's request for review, essentially affirming the death sentence and appellate affirmation of the jury's death verdict.

On August 16, 2018, President Donald Trump announced his intent to nominate Wrigley to be the U.S. attorney for the District of North Dakota. On August 27, 2018, his nomination was sent to the United States Senate. His nomination was not acted upon during the 115th United States Congress. He was renominated in February 2019. On February 28, 2019, his nomination was unanimously reported out of committee by voice vote. On April 11, 2019, his nomination was unanimously confirmed by voice vote by the full Senate. On April 17, 2019, he was sworn into office as the United States attorney for a second time.

On February 8, 2021, the Biden administration directed the United States attorneys were to resign their posts, as is routine during a presidential transition. On February 23, 2021, Wrigley announced his resignation, effective February 28, 2021.

=== Lieutenant governor ===
On November 4, 2010, then-Lieutenant Governor Jack Dalrymple designated Wrigley as his successor once his transition of the governor's office was completed (then-Governor John Hoeven had just been elected to the U.S. Senate). Wrigley was sworn into office on December 7, 2010, following the swearing in of Governor Dalrymple. Dalrymple and Wrigley were elected to full terms in November 2012.

Wrigley considered running in the 2016 North Dakota gubernatorial election, but ultimately decided not to run.

=== Attorney general of North Dakota ===
Wrigley declared his candidacy for Attorney General, in early January 2022. Weeks later, the 22 year incumbent attorney general, Wayne Stenehjem, died unexpectedly. On February 8, 2022, Governor Doug Burgum appointed Wrigley as North Dakota attorney general following the death of former attorney general Wayne Stenehjem. Wrigley had announced on December 30, 2021, that he would run for a full term in the 2022 election. Wrigley won a full term in the November general election, receiving 71% of the votes cast.

Wrigley was put into the public eye in the aftermath of the 2023 shooting of Fargo police officers in which he released the bodycam footage from Officer Zach Robinson of the shooting, information on the perpetrator, and further information on the investigations incredibly early into the case. He received praise for his swift work with the case.

Later in the year, Wrigley reported that the state crime lab had completed the backlog of sexual assault examination kits in October. In the aftermath of the indictment of Ray Holmberg, Wrigley shared information that involved his predecessor, Wayne Stenehjem, not “saving himself” from the case. This especially was the case after a long period of time where Stenehjem's government emails with relation to the case were deleted after his death. Wrigley also has plans to investigate everyone who had knowledge of any of Holmberg's activities and conduct.

Crime reports from 2023, a year into his term, showed North Dakota had received a small uptick in violent crime and theft. Wrigley himself attributed the increase to general population increase and law enforcement position vacancies.

Before the 2024 North Dakota elections, Wrigley engaged in a series of efforts to fight a state court ruling that the Indian Reservations within the state, specifically the Spirit Lake and Turtle Mountain tribes, be given their own specific legislative district. Wrigley defended the states position in appealing to the United States Supreme Court with the argument that the court hasn't ruled on whether a state's attempt to satisfy a federal law, the Voting Rights Act, satisfies the Equal Protection Clause. The states arguments failed, and the redistricting would go into effect.

In May 2024, Wrigley joined Republican attorneys general from other states in litigation against the Biden administration's interpretational ruling on Title IX, the administrations argument being that Title IX would allow transgender students to participate in the gendered sport of their choice.

== Personal life ==
Attorney General Wrigley lives in Bismarck, ND, and has three children. He and Kathleen Boyle Wrigley separated in 2023 and divorced in 2025. Wrigley admitted to having an extramarital affair in 2015 while serving as the state's lieutenant governor.

Party political offices
Preceded by Jack Dalrymple	Republican nominee for Lieutenant Governor of North Dakota; 2012	Succeeded by Brent Sanford
Preceded by Wayne Stenehjem	Republican nominee for North Dakota Attorney General; 2022, 2026	Most recent
Legal offices
Preceded by John Schneider	United States Attorney for the District of North Dakota; 2001–2009	Succeeded by Tim Purdon
Preceded by Tim Purdon	United States Attorney for the District of North Dakota; 2019–2021	Succeeded by Nick Chase; Acting
Preceded by Troy Seibel; Acting	Attorney General of North Dakota; 2022–present	Incumbent
Political offices
Preceded by Jack Dalrymple	Lieutenant Governor of North Dakota; 2010–2016	Succeeded by Brent Sanford
