= Clara Sue Price =

American politician

Member of the North Dakota House of Representatives from the 40th district
- In office September 17, 2024 – December 1, 2024
- Preceded by: Randy Schobinger
- Succeeded by: Macy Bolinske

Personal details
- Party: Republican

Clara Sue Price is an American politician. A member of the Republican Party, she has served as a member of the North Dakota House of Representatives for the 40th district since September 2024. She previously served as a member of the chamber from 1991 to 2008.
