= Kelly Schmidt =

American politician (born 1962)

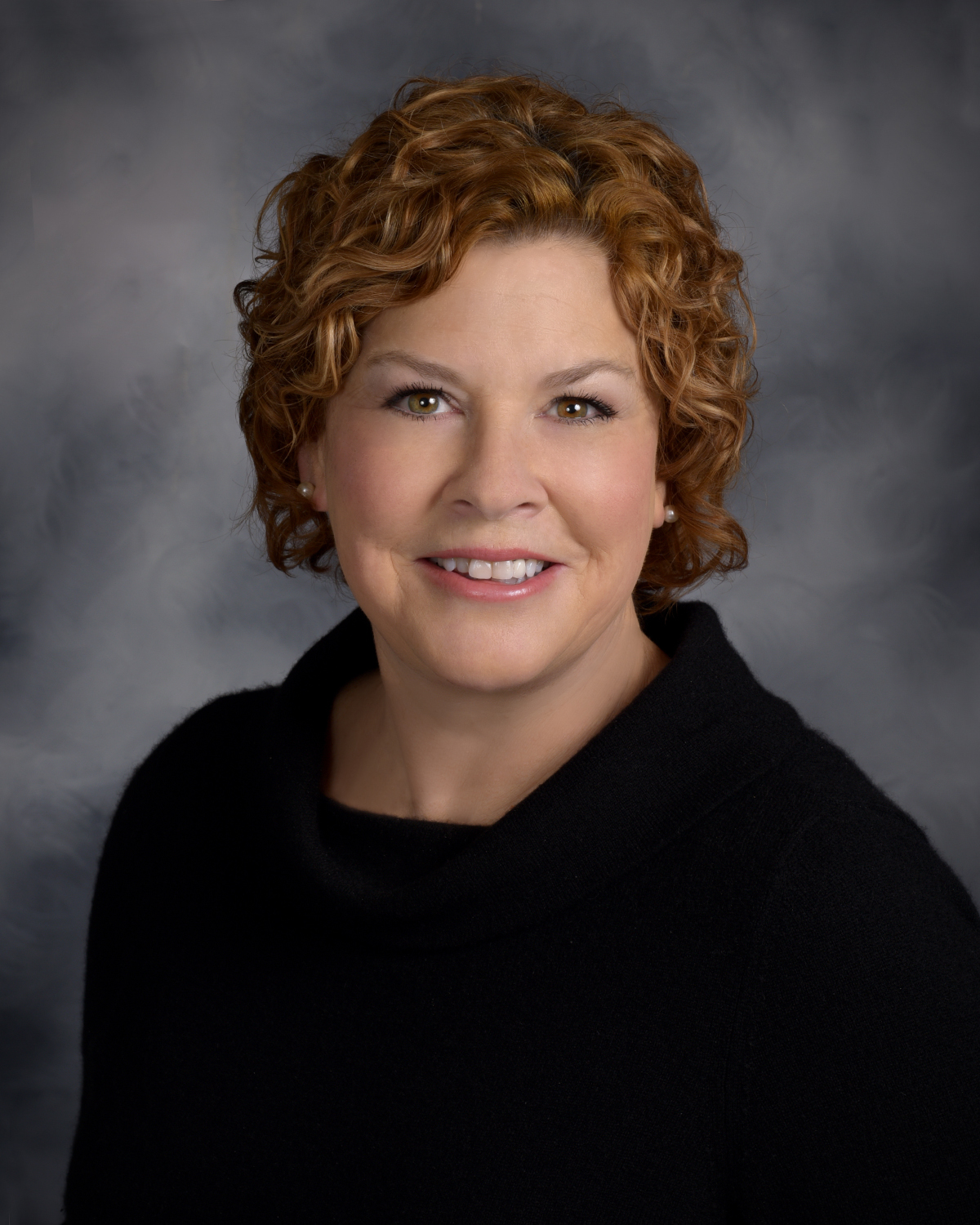

33rd Treasurer of North Dakota
- In office January 1, 2005 – January 1, 2021
- Governor: John Hoeven; Jack Dalrymple; Doug Burgum
- Preceded by: Kathi Gilmore
- Succeeded by: Thomas Beadle

Personal details
- Born: August 26, 1962 (age 63) Elmhurst, Illinois, U.S.
- Party: Republican
- Education: Northwestern University (BA)

Kelly Schmidt (born August 26, 1962) is an American politician who served as the 33rd North Dakota treasurer from 2005 to 2021. She is the longest-serving treasurer in North Dakota's history and a member of the Republican Party.

== Electoral history ==
North Dakota Treasurer Election, 2004
Party	Candidate	Votes	%
Republican	Kelly Schmidt	165,736	56.34
Democratic–NPL	Dean Meyer	128,460	43.66

North Dakota Treasurer Election, 2008
Party	Candidate	Votes	%
Republican	Kelly Schmidt (inc.)	180,828	61.45
Democratic–NPL	Mitch Vance	113,423	38.55

North Dakota Treasurer Election, 2012
Party	Candidate	Votes	%
Republican	Kelly Schmidt (inc.)	197,041	65.83
Democratic–NPL	Ross Mushik	101,795	34.01
Write-in		470	0.16

North Dakota State Treasurer election, 2016
Party	Candidate	Votes	%
Republican	Kelly Schmidt	204,733	62.95
Democratic–NPL	Tim Mathern	95,191	29.27
Libertarian	Eric Olson	24,829	7.63
Write-in		491	0.15
Total votes		325,244	100.00

== Notes ==
Party political offices
Preceded by Randy Schobinger	Republican nominee for North Dakota State Treasurer; 2004, 2008, 2012, 2016	Succeeded by Thomas Beadle
Political offices
Preceded by Kathi Gilmore	Treasurer of North Dakota; 2005–2021	Succeeded by Thomas Beadle
