= Thomas Beadle =

American politician (born 1987)

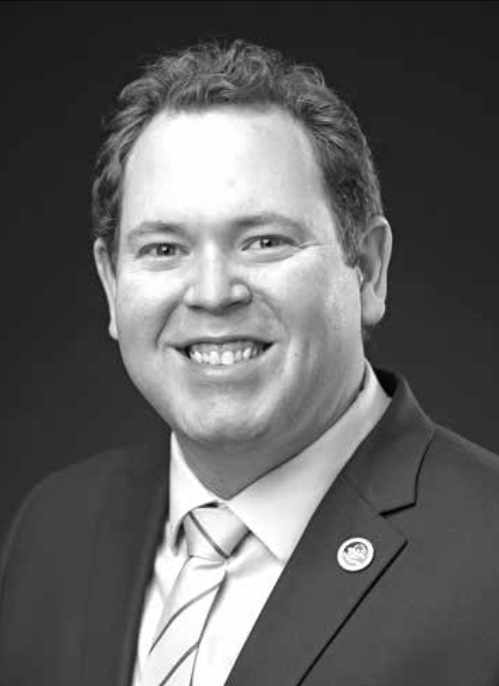
- Beadle in 2023

34th Treasurer of North Dakota
- Incumbent
- Assumed office January 1, 2021
- Governor: Doug Burgum; Kelly Armstrong
- Preceded by: Kelly Schmidt

Member of the North Dakota House of Representatives from the 27th district
- In office December 2010 – December 2020
- Preceded by: Lee Myxter
- Succeeded by: Greg Stemen

Personal details
- Born: March 22, 1987 (age 39) Nashville, Tennessee, U.S.
- Party: Republican
- Relatives: Earl Strinden (grandfather); Tony Grindberg (stepfather)
- Education: Concordia College, Minnesota (BA)

Thomas Beadle (born March 22, 1987) is an American politician from the state of North Dakota. A Republican, he is the North Dakota State Treasurer. Beadle was previously a member of the North Dakota House of Representatives.

== Career ==
Beadle graduated from Concordia College. He has worked as a realtor and business manager of a graphic design firm.

Beadle was first elected to the North Dakota House of Representatives in 2010, succeeding Lee Myxter, who did not run for reelection to run for a seat in the North Dakota Senate.

Beadle ran for North Dakota State Treasurer in the 2020 elections. He faced Daniel Johnston for the Republican Party nomination for state treasurer in the primary election. Beadle defeated Johnston, and won the general election in November, defeating Democrat Mark Haugen with 66% of the vote. He was sworn in as state treasurer on January 1.

== Personal life ==
His grandfather was Earl Strinden, a former majority leader of the North Dakota House. His aunt, Michelle Strinden, also serves in the North Dakota House, and his stepfather, Tony Grindberg, is a former member of the North Dakota Senate.

Party political offices
Preceded by Kelly Schmidt	Republican nominee for North Dakota State Treasurer; 2020, 2024	Most recent
Political offices
Preceded by Kelly Schmidt	Treasurer of North Dakota; 2021–present	Incumbent
