= David Brightbill =

David Brightbill may refer to:

- David J. Brightbill (1942–2025), member of the Pennsylvania State Senate
- David K. Brightbill (1863–1949), North Dakota public servant and politician
- David Brightbill (Better Call Saul)
