= Carl Anderson (North Dakota politician) =

American politician

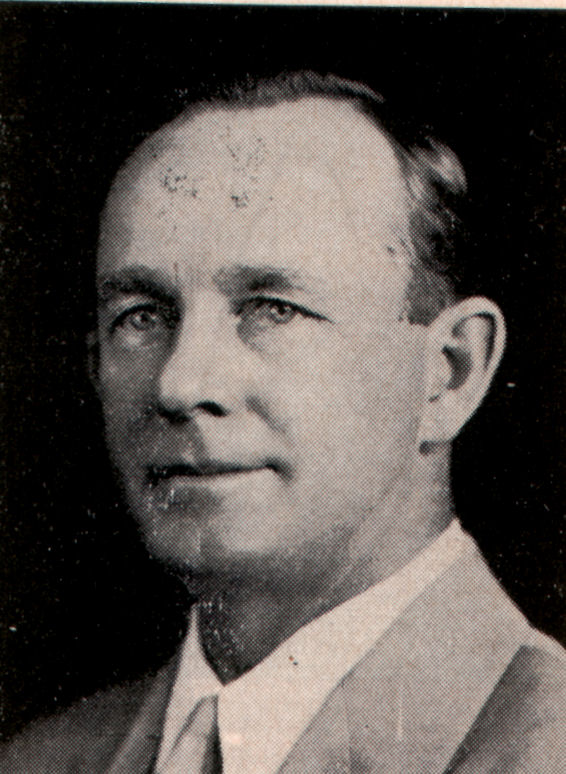

Treasurer of North Dakota
- In office 1941–1944
- Governor: John Moses
- Preceded by: John R. Omland
- Succeeded by: Otto Krueger

Personal details
- Born: July 16, 1897 Lyon County, Minnesota
- Died: February 7, 1945 (aged 47)

Carl Anderson (July 16, 1897 – February 7, 1945) was a North Dakota public servant and politician with the Republican Party. He served as the North Dakota State Treasurer from 1941 to 1944. He did not seek re-election to another term since Treasurers were not permitted to serve more than two consecutive terms.

== Biography ==
Carl O. Anderson was born in Lyon County, Minnesota in 1897. He resided there until he was 10 years old, and came to North Dakota; settling in Morton County. After living there for 18 years, he moved to Cass County and attended the Normal School at Valley City, North Dakota. He taught for six terms, but then returned to farming near Page. Anderson was a member of the Lutheran Church, and he was married to Dorothy Gross of Raleigh, North Dakota, whose father, Otis Gross, served in the North Dakota Senate during the 1920s.

Anderson was elected as the North Dakota State Treasurer in 1940, and served until term restrictions made him unable to run for re-election in 1944. He died in 1945 at the age of 47, just over a month after leaving office.

== Notes ==
Party political offices
Preceded by John R. Omland	Republican nominee for North Dakota State Treasurer; 1940, 1942	Succeeded by Otto Krueger
Political offices
Preceded by John R. Omland	North Dakota State Treasurer; 1941–1944	Succeeded by Otto Krueger
