= Phil Fox (politician) =

American politician

Member-elect of the Missouri House of Representatives from the 2nd district
- Assuming office January 6, 2027
- Succeeding: Mazzie Christensen

Personal details
- Party: Republican
- Website: www.foxformissouri.com

Phil Fox is an American politician of the Missouri Republican Party who is the representative-elect for the 2nd district in the Missouri House of Representatives. He was elected in the 2026 general election. He was elected with 75% of the vote. Fox is an educator.
