= Cole Christensen =

American politician (born 1997)

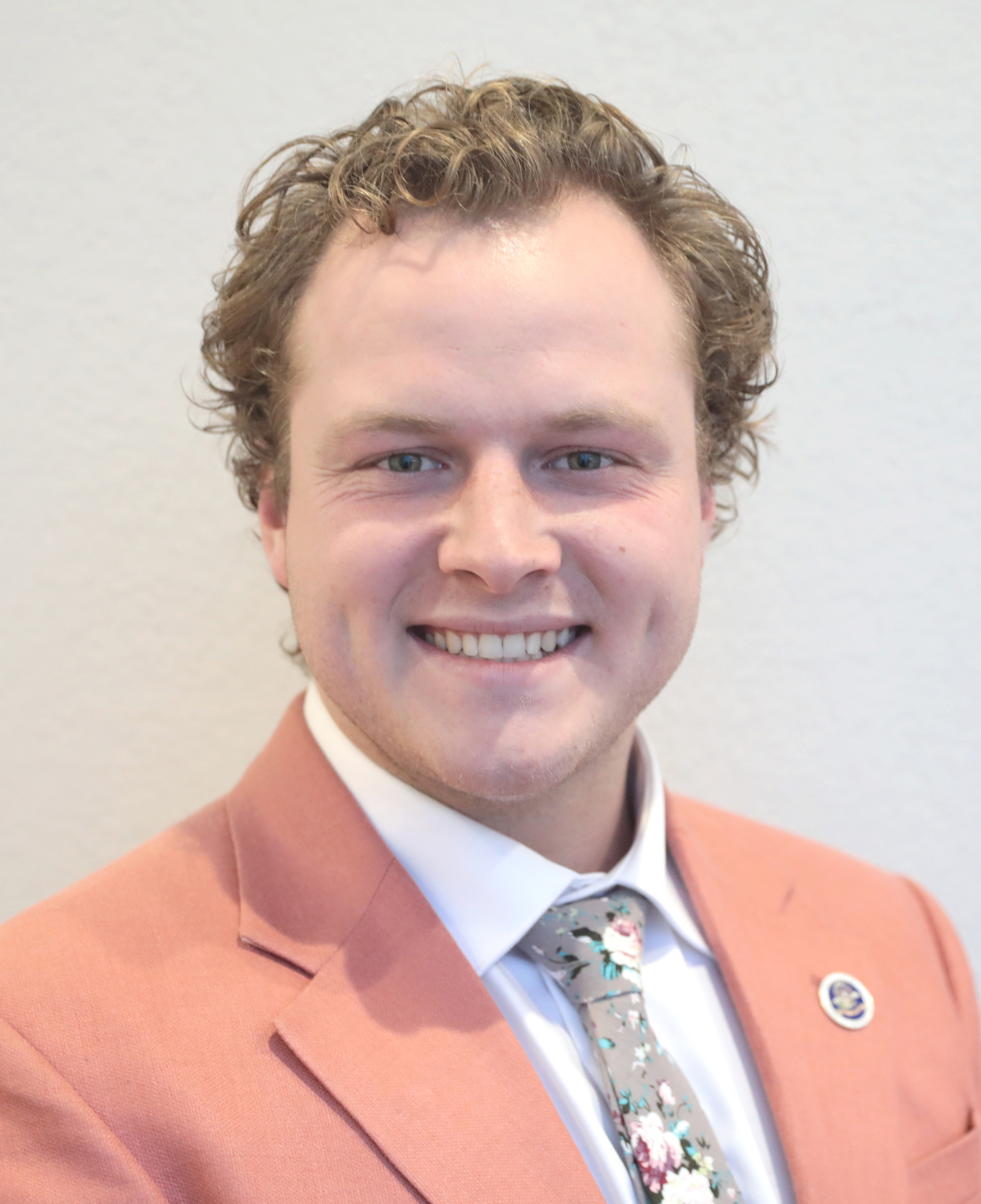
- Christensen at the 2022 Hazlitt Summit hosted by Young Americans for Liberty Foundation

Member of the North Dakota House of Representatives from the 24th district
- In office December 1, 2020 – February 23, 2024
- Preceded by: Daniel Johnston
- Succeeded by: Rose Christensen

Personal details
- Born: Cole Christensen; 1997 (age 28–29) Jamestown, North Dakota, U.S.
- Party: Republican
- Spouse: Mazzie Boyd (m. 2023)
- Relatives: Rose Christensen (grandmother)

Cole Christensen (born 1997) is an American politician who served as a member of the North Dakota House of Representatives from the 24th district between 2020 and 2024. Christensen resigned from office in order to move to Missouri and appointed Rose Christensen, his grandmother, to succeed him for the remainder of his term.

== Early life and education ==
Christensen was born in 1997 in Jamestown, North Dakota, one of four children, to Frank R. Christensen, a chimney sweep contractor, and Laurie Jean Christensen. His paternal great-grandfather, Axel J. Christensen, immigrated to North Dakota from Nykobing Falster, Denmark prior to 1913. He is a native of Rogers, North Dakota, primarily of Danish descent. He attended the Association Free Lutheran College and Lynnes Welding Training.

== Career ==
Christensen has worked as a welder. He is also the manager of a seed plant. Christensen was elected to the North Dakota House of Representatives in November 2020 and assumed office on December 1, 2020. In May 2021, Christensen was selected as "Legislative Rookie of the Year" by fellow members of the House.

In August 2022, Christensen was revealed to be a member of a Telegram group called the North Dakota Young Republicans which "frequently featured bigoted slurs and white supremacist tropes" in its messages between members, including personal attacks against gay public figures and anti-Semitic conspiracy theories.

In 2023, Christensen co-sponsored HB 1522, a bathroom bill which also prohibited schools from requiring people to use a student’s preferred pronouns. Regarding transgender children, he said: "They throw on womanhood like it’s a cape and I think that’s one of the most degrading things to females, is to pretend that anyone can be a biological female, when that’s just scientifically impossible, no matter how many hormone blockers you take." The bill was signed into law by Governor Doug Burgum on May 8, 2023.

Christensen resigned from the North Dakota House in February 2024 in order to move to Missouri. His grandmother Rose Christensen was appointed to succeed him.

== Personal life ==
On November 19, 2023, Christensen married Mazzie Boyd, a fellow state legislator who serves in the Missouri House of Representatives, also for the Republican Party, in Valley City, North Dakota.
