= Bob Peterson =

Bob Peterson may refer to:

- Bob Peterson (North Dakota politician) (born 1951), North Dakota State Auditor
- Bob Peterson (Ohio politician) (born 1962), member of the Ohio House of Representatives
- Bob Peterson (baseball) (1884–1962), American baseball player
- Bob Peterson (basketball) (1932–2011), American basketball player
- Bob Peterson (filmmaker) (born 1961), American animator, screenwriter and voice actor
- Bob Peterson (photographer) (born 1944), Canadian photographer

== See also ==
- Robert Peterson (disambiguation)
