= Tim Purdon =

American lawyer

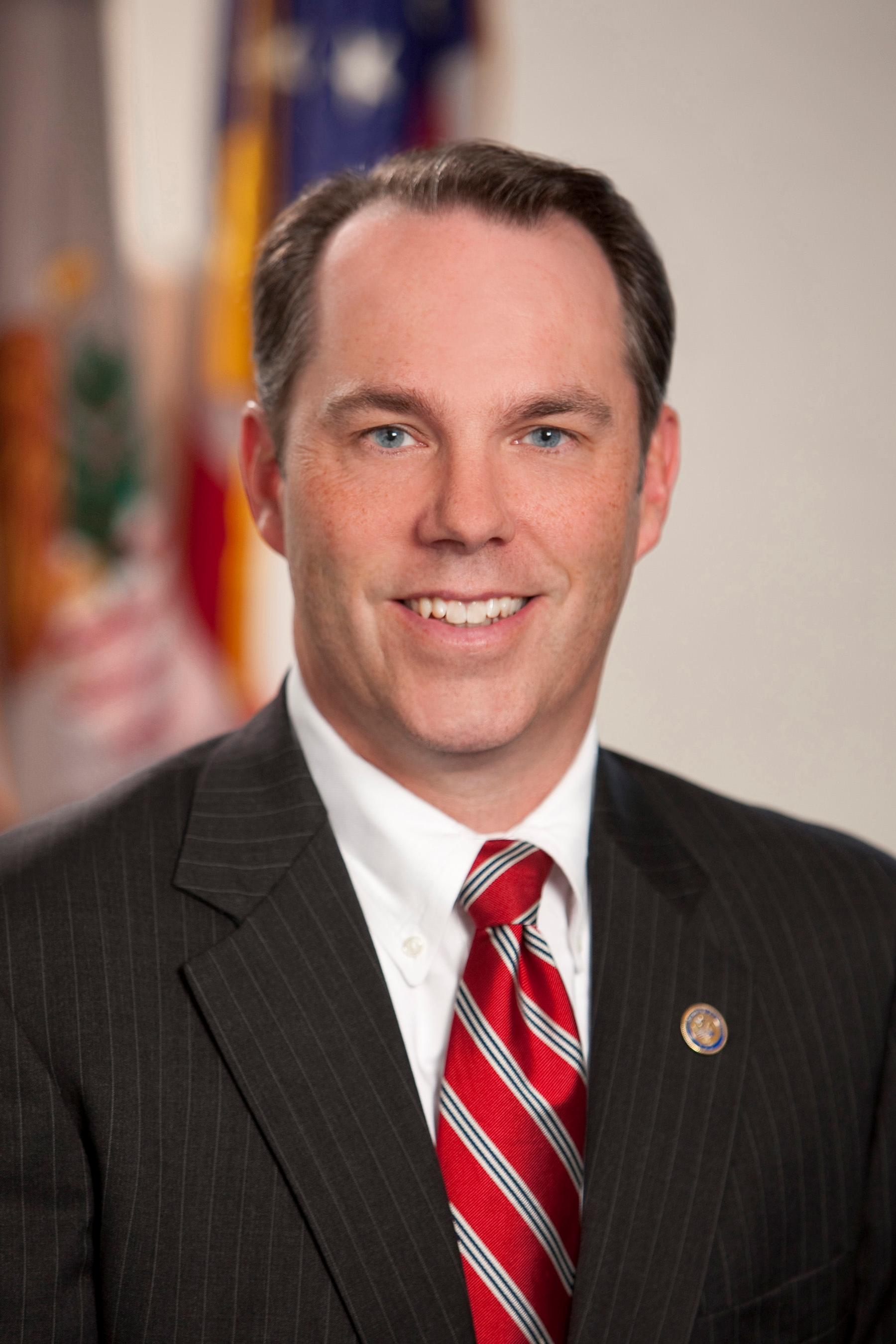
- Official portrait, 2015

18th U.S. Attorney for the District of North Dakota
- In office August 5, 2010 – March 12, 2015
- Nominated by: Barack Obama
- Preceded by: Drew Wrigley
- Succeeded by: Drew Wrigley

Personal details
- Born: Oakes, North Dakota
- Party: Democratic-NPL
- Spouse: Carmen Miller
- Children: Claudia Purdon
- Education: North Dakota State College of Science; Minnesota State University Moorhead; Hamline University School of Law
- Profession: Attorney

Timothy Q. Purdon is an American lawyer who served as the 18th United States Attorney for the District of North Dakota from 2010 to 2015. He is now a partner at Robins Kaplan LLP.

== Education ==
Born in Oakes, ND in 1968, Purdon moved to Ashby, MN with his family. After graduating from Ashby High School, Purdon graduated from North Dakota State College of Science in 1989 and from Minnesota State University Moorhead summa cum laude in 1991. He received his Juris Doctor from Hamline University School of Law in 1994. Following that, he clerked for Bruce Van Sickle, a judge on the United States District Court for the District of North Dakota.

== Career ==
Following his clerkship, Purdon practiced law at the firm of Dickson & Purdon in Bismarck, North Dakota. He then practiced law for the Vogel Law Firm, also in Bismarck, from 2005 to 2010. During this time, Minnesota Law & Politics Magazine named Purdon a "Great Plains Super Lawyer" in the practice area of Criminal Defense in 2007 and 2009.

During the 2000 presidential election, Puirdon was a North Dakota state co-chair of GoreNet, a group that supported the Al Gore campaign with a focus on grassroots and online organizing as well as hosting small-dollar donor events. During the 2008 Democratic presidential primary, Purdon served as North Dakota state chairman for the John Edwards campaign.

In 2010, Purdon was nominated by President Barack Obama to be the United States Attorney for the District of North Dakota. He was unanimously confirmed by the United States Senate on August 5, 2010. As U.S. Attorney, Purdon gave special focus to making North Dakota's American Indian reservations safer for their residents and to countering the burgeoning organized crime activity that came with the increased oil activity in western North Dakota during his tenure.

In 2013, Attorney General Eric Holder appointed Purdon the Chair of the Attorney General's Native American Issues Subcommittee (NAIS), which is responsible for recommending policy to address issues that specifically impact American Indian communities. In this role, Purdon also represented the Department of Justice in testimony before the United States Senate Committee on Indian Affairs. In 2014, Holder appointed Purdon to the select Attorney General's Advisory Committee (AGAC), which represents all U.S. Attorneys in advising the Department of Justice on criminal justice policy and department procedures.

On February 10, 2015, Purdon announced he was stepping down from the position of U.S. Attorney, effective March 13, 2015. On his departure from the Justice Department, Attorney General Holder praised his tenure as U.S. Attorney for North Dakota stating that, "Tim Purdon has been an outstanding United States Attorney, a fierce advocate for the people of North Dakota and a strong national leader whose efforts to improve public safety in Indian Country have made a profound difference – and touched countless lives."

Purdon then became a partner at Robins Kaplan LLP, for which he founded and opened a Bismarck office. In the summer of 2015, Purdon and former US Attorney for South Dakota Brendan Johnson founded Robins Kaplan's American Indian Law and Policy Group. Purdon co-chairs this group and the Government and Internal Investigations Group at Robins Kaplan. Purdon continues to practice American Indian Law, and was named Lawyer of the Year in 2021 in Minnesota for his tribal work.

Political offices
Preceded by Drew Wrigley	U.S. Attorney for the District of North Dakota; 2010–2015	Succeeded by Drew Wrigley
