= List of North Dakota state treasurers =

The following is a list of North Dakota state treasurers. The office has always been on a party affiliated ballot, and was a two-year term office until 1964. Since then, state treasurers have been elected to four-year terms. The state treasurer was prohibited from serving more than two consecutive terms until the prohibition was removed by a vote in 1996.

== List ==
State treasurers by party affiliation
Party	State treasurers
Republican	28
Democratic	6
Democratic-NPL	5
Democratic-Independent	1

#	Image	Name	Term	Party
1		Lewis E. Booker	1889–1892	Republican
2		Knud J. Nomland	1893–1894	Democratic-Independent
3		George E. Nichols	1895–1898	Republican
4		Dennis W. Driscoll	1899–1900	Republican
5		Donald H. McMillan	1901–1904	Republican
6		Albert Peterson	1905–1908	Republican
7		George L. Bickford	1909–1910	Republican
8		Gunder Olson	1911–1914	Republican
9		John Steen	1915–1918	Republican
10		Obert A. Olson	1919–1920	Republican/NPL
11		John Steen	1921–1924	Republican/IVA
12		Chessmur A. Fisher	1925–1928	Republican
13		Berta E. Baker	1929–1932	Republican/NPL
14		Alfred S. Dale	1933–1934	Republican/NPL
15		John Gray	1935–1938	Republican
16		John R. Omland	1939–1940	Republican/NPL
17		Carl Anderson	1941–1944	Republican
18		Otto Krueger	1945	Republican
19		Hjalmer W. Swenson	1945–1948	Republican
20		Albert Jacobson	1949–1952	Republican
21		Ray Thompson	1953–1954	Republican
22		Albert Jacobson	1955–1958	Republican
23		Mike J. Baumgartner	1958	Republican
24		John R. Erickson	1959–1962	Republican
25		Phil Hoghaug	1963–1964	Republican
26		Walter Christensen	1965–1968	Democratic-NPL
27		Bernice Asbridge	1969–1972	Republican
28		Walter Christensen	1973–1979	Democratic-NPL
29		Robert E. Hanson	1979–1980	Democratic-NPL
30		John S. Lesmeister	1981–1984	Republican
31		Robert E. Hanson	1985–1992	Democratic-NPL
32		Kathi Gilmore	1993–2004	Democratic-NPL
33		Kelly Schmidt	2005–2021	Republican
34		Thomas Beadle	2021–present	Republican

== See also ==
- North Dakota State Treasurer
