= Rock Dell, Minnesota =

Rock Dell
- Unincorporated community
- Location within Minnesota Location within the United States
- Coordinates: 43°55′15″N 92°38′19″W
- Country: United States
- State: Minnesota
- County: Olmsted
- Township: Rock Dell Township
- Elevation: 1,152 ft (351 m)
- Time zone: UTC-6 (Central (CST))
  - Summer (DST): UTC-5 (CDT)
- ZIP code: 55920, 55940, and 55976
- Area code: 507
- GNIS feature ID: 650188

Rock Dell is an unincorporated community in Rock Dell Township, Olmsted County, Minnesota, United States. The community is located near the junction of Olmsted County Roads 3, 26, and 126. The South Fork of the Zumbro River flows through the community. Nearby places include Byron, Hayfield, Stewartville, and Rochester.
