= Rose Christensen =

American politician (born 1937)

Member of the North Dakota House of Representatives from the 24th district
- In office March 6, 2024 – December 1, 2024
- Preceded by: Cole Christensen
- Succeeded by: Daniel Johnston

Personal details
- Born: Rose B. Shields; 1937 (age 88–89) North Dakota, U.S.
- Party: Republican
- Spouse: A. Dale Christensen (m. 1967; died 2006)
- Relatives: Cole Christensen (grandson)

Rose Christensen (née Shields; born December 1937) is an American politician who served on the North Dakota House of Representatives for the Republican Party representing the 24th district from March 6, 2024 to December 1, 2024. She succeeded her grandson, Cole Christensen, who moves out of state for the remaining term.

== Personal life ==
In 1967, Christensen married A. Dale Christensen (1922–2006), a farmer of Hannaford, North Dakota. He ran for North Dakota Senate in 1968 but ultimately was not elected. They had one son, Frank Christensen, of Courtney, North Dakota.
