= Carl R. Kositzky =

American politician (1876–1940)

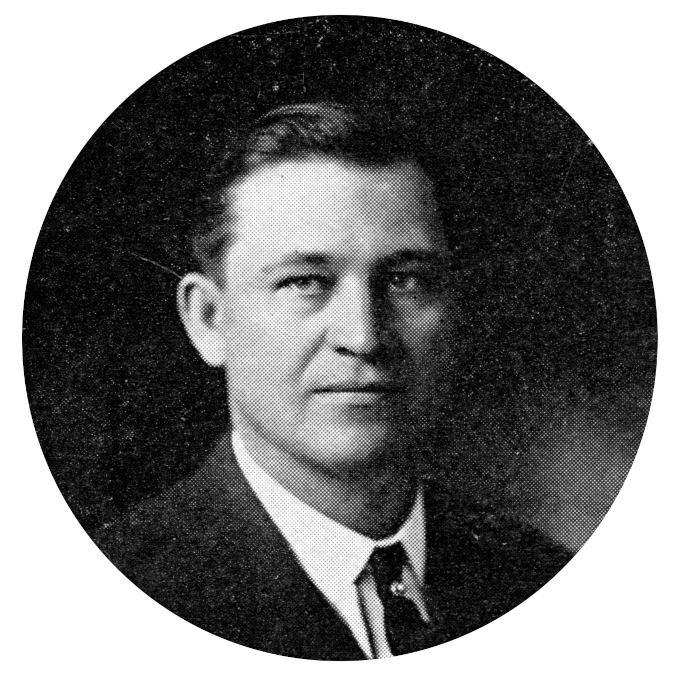
- Carl R. Kositzky, 1919

10th North Dakota State Auditor
- In office 1917–1920
- Governor: Lynn Frazier
- Preceded by: Carl O. Jorgenson
- Succeeded by: David C. Poindexter

North Dakota State Land Commissioner
- In office 1922–1927
- Governor: Ragnvald Nestos; Arthur G. Sorlie
- Preceded by: William J. Prater
- Succeeded by: William E. Byerly

Personal details
- Born: April 7, 1876 Yankton, South Dakota
- Died: January 18, 1940 (aged 63) Bismarck, North Dakota
- Party: Republican
- Spouse: Estelle Gaskill

Carl R. Kositzky (April 7, 1876 – January 18, 1940) was a North Dakota public servant and politician with the Republican Party who served as North Dakota State Auditor from 1917 to 1920 and State Land Commissioner from 1922 to 1927.

== Biography ==
=== Early years ===
Carl Reinholt Kositzky was born on April 7, 1876, in Yankton, South Dakota. After living in South Dakota and Nebraska, Kositzky moved to North Dakota in 1901, settling on a farm near Sterling. In 1902, Kositzky married Estelle Gaskill.

=== Burleigh County Treasurer and Commissioner ===
During the early 1900s, Kositzky became involved in local politics, serving as county treasurer and commissioner of Burleigh County from 1908 to 1916.

In early August 1912, while serving as county treasurer, Kositzky started, and reportedly won, a fight with Commissioner E. G. Patterson in the halls of the courthouse. Patterson, and his friends, maintained that he was unhurt and that Kositzky struck him from behind while he was walking with his hands in his pockets.

E. S. Pierce, an eyewitness to the altercation, filed a complaint a few days later, charging Kositzky with assault and battery. Kositzky appeared before Judge Olson and pleaded guilty. He received a fine of $5.00. According to the Washburn Leader, the fight may have had something to do with Kositzky discovering that E. G. Patterson and Alexander McKenzie were receiving suspicious tax breaks.

=== State Auditor ===
In 1916, Kositzky decided to run for the office of North Dakota State Auditor. He received the endorsement of the Nonpartisan League (NPL). Kositzky defeated incumbent Carl O. Jorgenson in the Republican Primary in June, and then he won the general election in November by more than 55,000 votes. He was reelected again in 1918.

In 1919, Kositzky grew dissatisfied with the NPL and its leaders. Kositzky, along with William Langer (Attorney General) and Thomas Hall (Secretary of State), openly denounced and defected from the NPL. A newspaper, the Washburn Leader, would call Kositzky "the most radical of the [NPL] insurgents." In the fall of 1919, Kositzky and other opponents of the NPL formed the Citizens Economy League and began publishing a vicious anti-NPL magazine called The Red Flame.

For their defection, the NPL labeled Kositzky, Langer, and Hall as traitors, and the NPL-controlled state legislature retaliated by slashing the appropriations of their respective departments. The State Auditor was also removed from the State Auditing Board, State Board of Equalization, and the Emergency Commission. Undeterred, Kositzky continued to undermine the NPL. The Red Flame continued its monthly publication until October 1920.

In September 1919, Kositzky was charged with assaulting C. K. Gummerson, a reporter for a pro-NPL newspaper the Courier-News. Reportedly, Kositzky, angered by Gummerson's articles, attempted to take Gummerson over his knee and administer a spanking. The case later went to trial. In January 1920, the jury could not agree on a verdict and the charges against Kositzky were dropped.

During the 1919 special legislative session, Kositzky helped instigate a book scandal with the state library. The newly created, and NPL-controlled, Board of Administration, which oversaw the state library, wanted the library to expand and diversify its collections. Kositzky provided the legislature with copies of invoices for recent books purchased. The opponents of the NPL, particularly the Independent Voters Association (IVA) and Rep. Olger B. Burtness, pounced on this opportunity. They used the books, which they deemed to be radical and socialist, to their advantage by publicly challenging and smearing the NPL and the Board of Administration. They claimed the NPL was using the Board of Administration, and subsequently the state library, to circulate radical books to schools and children. A special committee was formed to investigate. The state library and the Board of Administration were later exonerated, but the NPL's reputation suffered.

Also during the 1919 special legislative session, Kositzky got into another fight. In December 1919, Kositzky was refusing, or at least delaying, to issue warrants (expense checks) to legislators. A committee was appointed to investigate this situation. The committee chair, Senator A. A. Liederbach confronted Kositzky in the halls of the Capitol, which reportedly resulted in a fist fight between the two men.

Kositzky was defeated in the 1920 election by NPL-endorsed David C. Poindexter. Kositzky. He did not run again for the office.

=== Later years ===
Kositzky worked in the State Land Department from 1922 to 1932. He was appointed State Land Commissioner in 1922 and served in that role until 1927. He then worked as Deputy State Land Commissioner under this successor until 1932.

He served as a Burleigh County Deputy Sheriff from 1935 to 1939.

On January 18, 1940, Kositzky died at the age of 63 in Bismarck, North Dakota.

== Personal life ==
In 1902, Kositzky married Estelle Gaskill, and they had multiple children.

Kositzky had German ancestry. His family emigrated from Germany to the United States in 1871. His father, Gustave Kositzky, was a veteran of the Austro-Prussian War and the Franco-Prussian War. This military background later influenced his sons, three of whom served in World War I.

== See also ==
- List of North Dakota state auditors

Political offices
Preceded by Carl O. Jorgenson	North Dakota State Auditor; 1917–1920	Succeeded by David C. Poindexter
