= Tony Grindberg =

American politician

Member of the Fargo City Commission
- Incumbent
- Assumed office June 2016

Member of the North Dakota Senate from the 41st district
- In office December 1, 1992 – December 1, 2014
- Succeeded by: Kyle Davison

Personal details
- Born: December 21, 1960 (age 65)
- Party: Republican
- Relations: Thomas Beadle (stepson)

Tony Grindberg (born December 21, 1960) is an American politician who served in the North Dakota Senate from the 41st district from 1992 to 2014. Tony Grindberg was elected to the Fargo City Commission in June 2016.

== Personal life ==
Grindberg's stepson, Thomas Beadle, served as a member of the North Dakota House of Representatives.
