= Lee Myxter =

American politician

Member of the North Dakota House of Representatives from the 27th district
- In office 2006–2010
- Succeeded by: Thomas Beadle

Personal details
- Party: Democratic

Lee Myxter (born September 27, 1943) is a former state representative in North Dakota. A Democrat, he represented District 27 and lived in Fargo. He is a former English teacher and is married with five children. Myxter taught in the Fargo public school system from 1967 until 2005, He won his first election, in 2006, by 1,895 votes coming first among four candidates. In 2009 he led the Democrat campaign to ensure that the State's Superintendent of Education held a licence to teach when elected. The same year he voted against North Dakota's Personhood of Children Act, which aimed to "provide equality and rights to all human beings at every stage of biological development". This step could eventually eliminate all types of induced abortion for nearly any reason in the state of North Dakota.

Thomas Beadle succeeded him in office in 2010. The same year, Myxter campaigned for Jim Pomeroy's Senate seat without success; and did so again in 2012 but lost.
