= Mazzie Christensen =

American politician

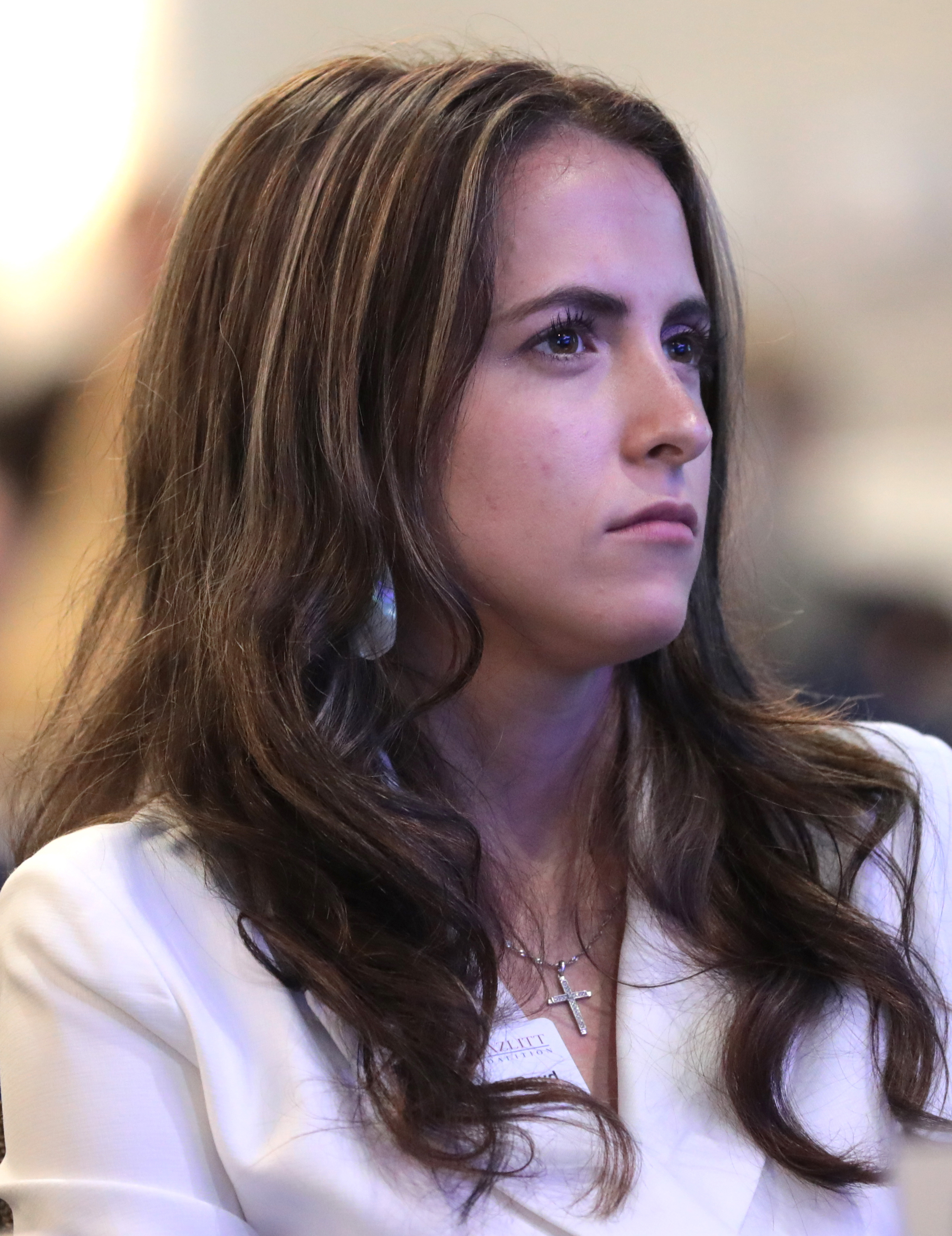
- Boyd in 2022

Member of the Missouri House of Representatives from the 2nd district
- Incumbent
- Assumed office January 4, 2023
- Preceded by: J. Eggleston
- Succeeded by: Phil Fox (elect)

Personal details
- Born: Mazzie Boyd; August 3, 1998 (age 28) Stewartsville, Missouri, U.S.
- Party: Republican
- Spouse: Cole Christensen (m. 2023)
- Education: Missouri Western State University (BBA)
- Website: Campaign website

Mazzie M. Boyd Christensen (née Boyd; born August 3, 1998) is an American politician. She currently serves as a member of the Missouri House of Representatives for the 2nd District, which encompasses Grundy, Harrison, Caldwell, Daviess and Worth County, for the Republican Party since 2023. She is currently among the youngest state legislators in the United States.

== Early life and education ==
Christensen was born on August 3, 1998, in Stewartsville, Missouri, to Jason and Megan Boyd. She grew up on the family farm. She has two younger brothers. Christensen attended St. Joseph Christian School and Missouri Western State University. Christensen received a Bachelor of Business Administration from Missouri Western State University.

== Career ==
In August 2022, Christensen defeated state Representative Randy Railsback in the Republican primary election for the 2nd district of the Missouri House of Representatives. The 2nd district covers Grundy, Harrison, Caldwell, Daviess, and Worth counties. In November 2022, she defeated Lois Pontius in the general election, winning 82 percent of the votes. She assumed office for her first two-year term in 2023 at the age of 24.

Before being elected, Christensen served in the White House as an executive assistant to the Director of Presidential Personnel John McEntee under the Trump administration, as well as a war room analyst for Donald J. Trump for President, Inc. She also worked as an intern for U.S. Senator Roy Blunt, and a communications assistant for the Congressional Office of Rep. Marjorie Taylor Greene.

On March 31, 2026, announced that she would not be seeking re-election to her seat in the Missouri House of Representatives, saying that she is planning to focus on her family.

== Personal life ==
On November 19, 2023, Boyd married Cole Christensen, a fellow state legislator who served in the North Dakota House of Representatives since 2020, also for the Republican Party, in Valley City, North Dakota.
