= 1896 North Dakota gubernatorial election =

- November 3, 1896
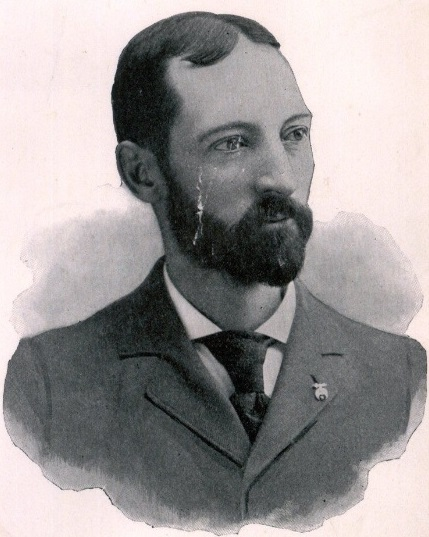

Nominee	Frank A. Briggs	Robert B. Richardson
Party	Republican	Populist
Popular vote	25,918	20,690
Percentage	55.61%	44.39%
- County results Briggs: 50–60% 60–70% 70–80% 80–90% >90% Richardson: 50–60% 60–70%
Governor before election
Roger Allin
Republican
Elected Governor
Frank A. Briggs
Republican

The 1896 North Dakota gubernatorial election was held on November 3, 1896. Republican nominee Frank A. Briggs defeated People's Party nominee Robert B. Richardson with 55.61% of the vote.

== General election ==
=== Candidates ===
- Frank A. Briggs, Republican
- Robert B. Richardson, People's

=== Results ===
1896 North Dakota gubernatorial election
Party	Candidate	Votes	%	±%
Republican	Frank A. Briggs	25,918	55.61	▼0.15
Populist	Robert B. Richardson	20,690	44.39	▲22.40
Majority		5,228	11.22	▼22.55
Total votes		46,608	100.00	
Republican hold				
