= Steve Tomac =

American politician

Steve Tomac (born 1953) is a retired Democratic member of the North Dakota Legislative Assembly serving in both the North Dakota House of Representatives (1987–1989) and the North Dakota Senate (1991–2002). Tomac represented Morton County in both North Dakota's 53rd Legislative District (1987–1989) and the 31st Legislative District (1991–2002). He lives in Saint Anthony, North Dakota.

== Personal life ==
Steve Tomac was born in Hettinger, North Dakota, in 1953 and currently works as a farmer-rancher in Saint Anthony. He previously worked as a professional rodeo clown, performing at rodeos from 1971 until 2004. As a rodeo clown, he performed as both a bullfighter, barrel man, and contract specialty act. In August 2008, he was inducted into the North Dakota Cowboy Hall of Fame.

Party political offices
Preceded by Robert E. Hanson	Democratic nominee for Tax Commissioner of North Dakota; 2000	Succeeded by Mike Every
