= Rock Dell Township, Olmsted County, Minnesota =

Rock Dell Township, Minnesota
- Township
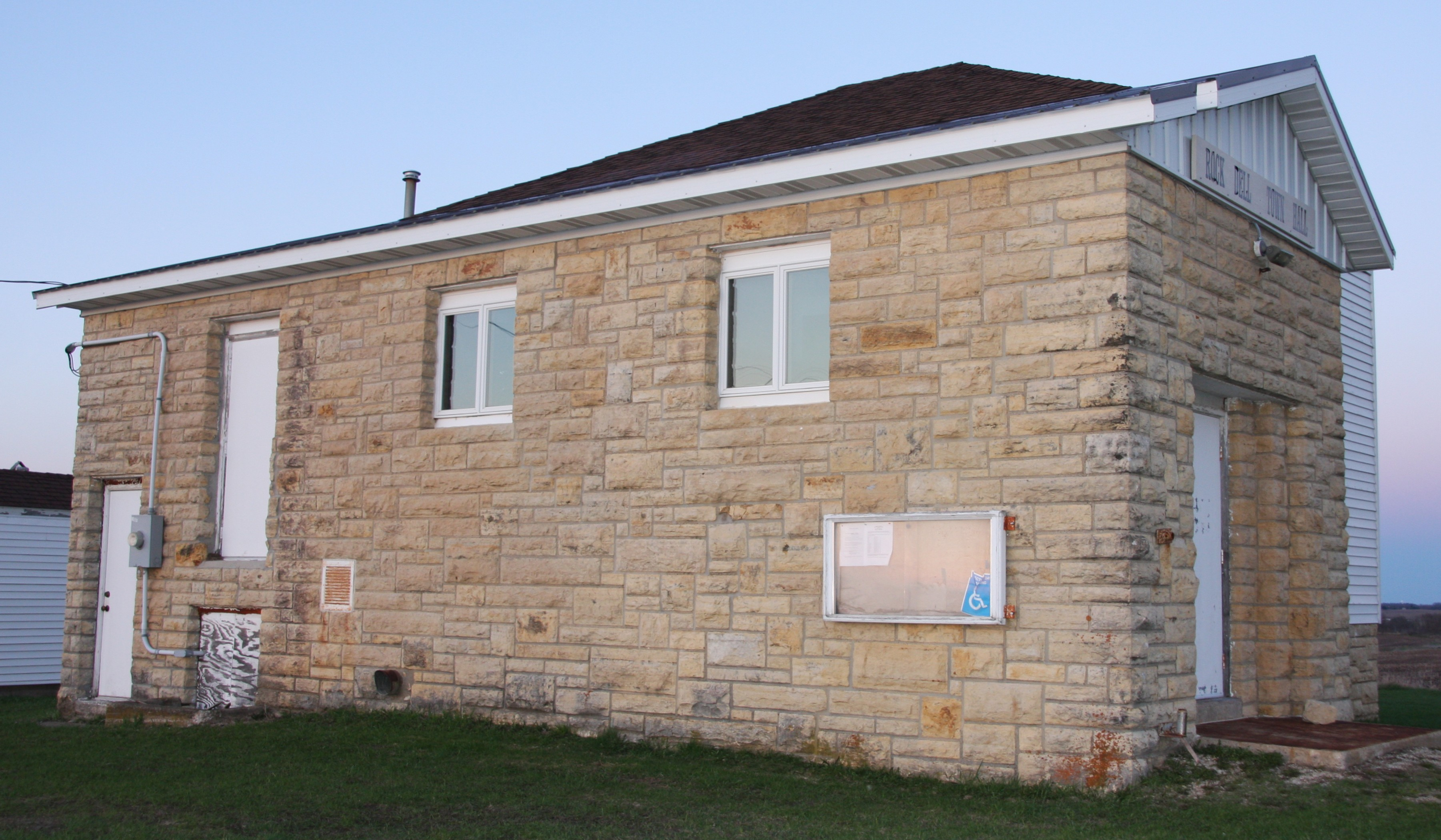
- Rock Dell Town Hall

- Location within the state of Minnesota Rock Dell Township, Minnesota (the United States)
- Coordinates: 43°53′34″N 92°36′53″W
- Country: United States
- State: Minnesota
- County: Olmsted

Area
  - Total: 36.0 sq mi (93.3 km^{2})
  - Land: 36.0 sq mi (93.3 km^{2})
  - Water: 0 sq mi (0.0 km^{2})
- Elevation: 1,210 ft (370 m)

Population (2000)
  - Total: 627
  - Density: 17/sq mi (6.7/km^{2})
- Time zone: UTC-6 (Central (CST))
  - Summer (DST): UTC-5 (CDT)
- FIPS code: 27-54988
- GNIS feature ID: 0665434
- Website: https://rockdellmn.org/

Rock Dell Township is a township in Olmsted County, Minnesota, United States. The population was 627 at the 2000 census.

Rock Dell Township was organized in 1858, and named for its rock outcroppings.

== Geography ==
According to the United States Census Bureau, the township has a total area of 36.0 square miles (93.3 km^{2}), all land.

== Demographics ==
As of the census of 2000, there were 627 people, 224 households, and 185 families residing in the township. The population density was 17.4 people per square mile (6.7/km^{2}). There were 227 housing units at an average density of 6.3/sq mi (2.4/km^{2}). The racial makeup of the township was 99.04% White, 0.16% Native American, 0.48% Asian, and 0.32% from two or more races. Hispanic or Latino of any race were 0.16% of the population.

There were 224 households, out of which 35.3% had children under the age of 18 living with them, 75.4% were married couples living together, 4.5% had a female householder with no husband present, and 17.0% were non-families. 11.2% of all households were made up of individuals, and 2.2% had someone living alone who was 65 years of age or older. The average household size was 2.80 and the average family size was 3.06.

In the township the population was spread out, with 24.9% under the age of 18, 9.1% from 18 to 24, 28.1% from 25 to 44, 28.5% from 45 to 64, and 9.4% who were 65 years of age or older. The median age was 38 years. For every 100 females, there were 114.7 males. For every 100 females age 18 and over, there were 113.1 males.

The median income for a household in the township was $55,313, and the median income for a family was $60,938. Males had a median income of $35,000 versus $29,375 for females. The per capita income for the township was $24,343. About 4.1% of families and 5.9% of the population were below the poverty line, including 9.1% of those under age 18 and 6.9% of those age 65 or over.
