= Josh Gallion =

American politician

Auditor of North Dakota
- Incumbent
- Assumed office January 1, 2017
- Governor: Doug Burgum; Kelly Armstrong
- Preceded by: Bob Peterson

Personal details
- Born: Joshua Charles Gallion; March 19, 1979 (age 47) Spokane, Washington, U.S.
- Party: Republican
- Education: Bismarck State College (AA); Dickinson State University (BS); University of North Dakota (MBA)

Military service
- Allegiance: United States
- Branch/service: United States Air Force
- Years of service: 1998–2002

Joshua Charles Gallion (born March 19, 1979) is an American Republican politician and accountant who has served as North Dakota State Auditor since 2017.

== Biography ==
Results by county for the 2016 Auditor election. Counties won by Gallion are shown in red.

Gallion, born in Spokane, Washington, served in the United States Air Force from 1998 until 2002, settling in North Dakota after his enlistment. He graduated with an associate degree from Bismarck State College, with a bachelor's degree from Dickinson State University, and with a master's degree from the University of North Dakota in 2014.

Gallion served as accounting manager for the North Dakota Public Service Commission. He was nominated as the Republican candidate for state auditor in April 2016, defeating Brian Kroshus at the state Republican convention. In the general election, he faced off against Libertarian candidate Roland Riemers, who has unsuccessfully sought various political offices over the past several years, and formerly served as state Libertarian Party chair. Gallion defeated Riemers, 77%–23%. He carried every county except for two. He was reelected in 2020 with 68% of the vote.

== Personal life ==
Gallion and his wife, Becky, have two daughters.

Party political offices
Preceded by Bob Peterson	Republican nominee for Auditor of North Dakota; 2016, 2020, 2024	Most recent
Political offices
Preceded by Bob Peterson	Auditor of North Dakota; 2017–present	Incumbent
