= Naomi Muscha =

American politician

Member of the North Dakota House of Representatives from the 24th district
- In office December 1, 2012 – December 1, 2016
- Preceded by: Phillip Mueller; Ralph Metcalf
- Succeeded by: Daniel Johnston

Personal details
- Born: November 18, 1953 (age 72)
- Party: Democratic

Naomi Muscha (born November 18, 1953) is an American politician who served in the North Dakota House of Representatives from the 24th district from 2012 to 2016.
