= David K. Brightbill =

American politician

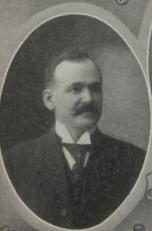
David K. Brightbill

David K. Brightbill (June 18, 1863 – October 19, 1949) was a North Dakota public servant and politician with the Republican Party who served as the North Dakota State Auditor from 1909 to 1912. After serving two terms, he did not seek re-election to the office in 1912.

== Biography ==
David K. Brightbill was born in 1865 in Lebanon County, Pennsylvania, and he came to Missouri with his parents as a boy, and then entered the Central Business college of that state in 1884. He went with an uncle to North Dakota in 1886, and became associated with the state's Republican Party. He then ran for the position of State Auditor in 1908, was re-elected in 1910, but did not seek re-election in 1912. He died at the age of 86 in 1949.

== Notes ==
Political offices
Preceded by Herbert L. Holmes	North Dakota State Auditor; 1909–1912	Succeeded by Carl O. Jorgenson
