= Robert Petersen =

Robert Petersen may refer to:

- Robert Storm Petersen (1882–1949), Danish cartoonist
- Robert E. Petersen (1926–2007), American publisher and automotive museum founder
- Robert Petersen (speed skater) (1914–2000), American Olympic speed skater

== See also ==
- Robert Peterson (disambiguation)
