= Robert W. Peterson (politician) =

American politician (1929–2013)

North Dakota State Auditor
- In office 1973–1996
- Governor: Arthur A. Link; Allen I. Olson; George A. Sinner; Ed Schafer
- Preceded by: Curtis G. Olson
- Succeeded by: Robert R. Peterson

Member of the North Dakota House of Representatives
- In office 1967-1973

Personal details
- Born: January 18, 1929 Williston, North Dakota, U.S.
- Died: April 18, 2013 (aged 84) Bismarck, North Dakota, U.S.
- Party: Republican

Robert W. Peterson (January 18, 1929 – April 18, 2013) was a U.S. politician serving as a public servant and politician from North Dakota. A member of the Republican Party, he served as the North Dakota State Auditor from 1973 to 1996. Prior to his tenure as Auditor, he served in the North Dakota House of Representatives from 1967 to 1972. His son, Robert R. Peterson, was his successor as State Auditor; he began serving in 1997.

== Biography ==
Peterson was born in Williston, North Dakota. He was the eldest of four boys born to Carsten and Clara (Solfest) Peterson. He was a graduate of Williston High School (1947), Concordia College, and the University of North Dakota with a master's degree in business administration. He served in the U.S. Army (1951–1953) . He was a teacher and coach from 1953 to 1963 at Alamo, ND. In 1963, Bob coached the Williston High School boys' basketball team to a North Dakota state championship.

He became involved in politics when he was elected to the North Dakota House of Representatives in 1966, and he served in that capacity until 1973 when he was elected as North Dakota State Auditor. He did not seek re-election to the position in 1996, and his son ran for and won the open seat.

He was married to Beverly Henning in 1950 at Fargo, ND. They had four children; Robert, Gary, Sonya, and Mark. Peterson died on April 18, 2013, in Bismarck.

Party political offices
Preceded by Curtis G. Olson	Republican nominee for North Dakota State Auditor; 1972, 1976, 1980, 1984, 1988, 1992	Succeeded by Bob Peterson
Political offices
Preceded by Curtis G. Olson	North Dakota State Auditor; 1973–1996	Succeeded by Robert R. Peterson
