= Bob Peterson (North Dakota politician) =

American politician

Auditor of North Dakota
- In office January 3, 1997 – December 15, 2016
- Governor: Ed Schafer; John Hoeven; Jack Dalrymple
- Preceded by: Robert Peterson
- Succeeded by: Josh Gallion

Personal details
- Born: September 26, 1951 (age 74) Fargo, North Dakota, U.S.
- Party: Republican
- Education: Williston State College; University of North Dakota (BS)

Robert Randall Peterson (born September 26, 1951, in Fargo, North Dakota) is an American Republican Party politician in North Dakota who served as North Dakota State Auditor from 1997 to 2016. He was also a Presidential Elector for the state in 1996. His father, Robert W. Peterson, was his predecessor as State Auditor; he served from 1973 to 1996.

== Biography ==
Bob Peterson is a graduate of Williston High School. He received his Associate in Arts degree from UND-Williston and his Bachelor of Science degree from the University of North Dakota. He also took classes in accounting at the University of Mary. He served as the accounting and budget specialist for the North Dakota State Land Department from 1978 to 1996 when he was elected as North Dakota State Auditor. He lives in Bismarck and is married to Kathleen and has one daughter, Brynn.

In 2015, Peterson announced that he would not seek a sixth term in the 2016 election.

== Electoral history ==
North Dakota Auditor Election, 1996
Party	Candidate	Votes	%
Republican	Robert "Bob" Peterson	140,596	54.61
Democratic	Shirley Dykshoorn	116,864	45.39

North Dakota Auditor Election, 2000
Party	Candidate	Votes	%
Republican	Robert "Bob" Peterson (inc.)	165,026	60.55
Democratic	Mary Ekstrom	107,505	39.45

North Dakota Auditor Election, 2004
Party	Candidate	Votes	%
Republican	Robert "Bob" Peterson (inc.)	188,822	64.24
Democratic	Brent Edison	105,102	35.76

North Dakota Auditor Election, 2008
Party	Candidate	Votes	%
Republican	Robert "Bob" Peterson (inc.)	179,897	60.74
Democratic	Daryl Splichal	116,269	39.26

North Dakota Auditor Election, 2012
Party	Candidate	Votes	%
Republican	Robert "Bob" Peterson (inc.)	188,859	62.50
Democratic	Scott Kelsh	112,803	37.33
Write-ins	Write-ins	515	0.17

== Notes ==
Party political offices
Preceded by Robert W. Peterson	Republican nominee for North Dakota State Auditor; 1996, 2000, 2004, 2008, 2012	Succeeded by Josh Gallion
Political offices
Preceded by Robert Peterson	Auditor of North Dakota; 1997–2016	Succeeded by Josh Gallion
