= 2022 North Dakota Attorney General election =

- November 8, 2022
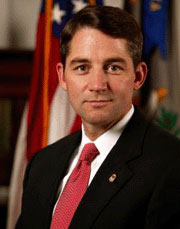

| Nominee | Drew Wrigley | Timothy Lamb |
| Party | Republican | Democratic–NPL |
| Popular vote | 166,517 | 67,609 |
| Percentage | 70.95% | 28.81% |
- County results Wrigley: 50–60% 60–70% 70–80% 80–90% >90% Lamb: 50–60% 60–70%
Attorney General before election
Drew Wrigley
Republican
Elected Attorney General
Drew Wrigley
Republican

The 2022 North Dakota Attorney General election took place on November 8, 2022, to elect the Attorney General of North Dakota. Incumbent Republican Attorney General Wayne Stenehjem had announced before his death on January 28, 2022, that he was retiring, and was replaced by former United States Attorney for the District of North Dakota and former Lieutenant Governor Drew Wrigley, who successfully ran for a full term in his own right.

== Republican primary ==
=== Candidates ===
==== Declared ====
- Drew Wrigley, incumbent attorney general, former United States Attorney for the District of North Dakota (2001–2009, 2019–2021) and former Lieutenant Governor of North Dakota (2010–2016)

==== Declined ====
- Wade Webb, district judge

== Democratic primary ==
=== Candidates ===
==== Declared ====
- Timothy Lamb, lawyer

=== Endorsements ===
Timothy Lamb

Organizations

- North Dakota Democratic–Nonpartisan League Party

== General election ==
=== Predictions ===
| Source | Ranking | As of |
|---|---|---|
| Sabato's Crystal Ball | Safe R | September 14, 2022 |
| Elections Daily | Safe R | November 1, 2022 |

=== Results ===
2022 North Dakota Attorney General election
| Party | Candidate | Votes | % | ±% |
|---|---|---|---|---|
| Republican | Drew Wrigley (incumbent) | 166,517 | 70.95% | +3.40 |
| Democratic–NPL | Tim Lamb | 67,609 | 28.81% | –3.42 |
| Write-in | | 576 | 0.24% | +0.02 |
| Total votes | | 234,702 | 100.00% | |
| Republican hold | | | | |

==== By county ====
| County | Drew Wrigley Republican | | Tim Lamb Democratic–NPL | | All Others | |
| County | # | % | # | % | # | % |
|---|---|---|---|---|---|---|
| Adams | 754 | 82.9% | 156 | 17.1% | 0 | 0.0% |
| Barnes | 2,669 | 69.9% | 1,139 | 29.8% | 8 | 0.2% |
| Benson | 890 | 61.2% | 562 | 38.6% | 3 | 0.2% |
| Billings | 464 | 89.4% | 55 | 10.6% | 0 | 0.0% |
| Bottineau | 2,181 | 78.5% | 592 | 21.3% | 5 | 0.2% |
| Bowman | 1,137 | 85.9% | 186 | 14.0% | 1 | 0.1% |
| Burke | 657 | 85.9% | 105 | 13.7% | 3 | 0.4% |
| Burleigh | 25,413 | 73.7% | 8,944 | 25.9% | 136 | 0.4% |
| Cass | 30,639 | 57.8% | 22,243 | 42.0% | 118 | 0.2% |
| Cavalier | 1,190 | 78.7% | 320 | 21.2% | 3 | 0.2% |
| Dickey | 1,342 | 77.0% | 399 | 22.9% | 1 | 0.1% |
| Divide | 795 | 79.1% | 210 | 20.9% | 0 | 0.0% |
| Dunn | 1,351 | 84.0% | 257 | 16.0% | 1 | 0.1% |
| Eddy | 686 | 73.9% | 241 | 26.0% | 1 | 0.1% |
| Emmons | 1,313 | 89.1% | 150 | 10.2% | 10 | 0.7% |
| Foster | 997 | 81.3% | 228 | 18.6% | 1 | 0.1% |
| Golden Valley | 638 | 85.5% | 107 | 14.3% | 1 | 0.1% |
| Grand Forks | 11,727 | 63.6% | 6,645 | 36.1% | 57 | 0.3% |
| Grant | 933 | 86.0% | 151 | 13.9% | 1 | 0.1% |
| Griggs | 747 | 77.2% | 218 | 22.5% | 2 | 0.2% |
| Hettinger | 868 | 85.4% | 147 | 14.5% | 1 | 0.1% |
| Kidder | 869 | 83.8% | 164 | 15.8% | 4 | 0.4% |
| LaMoure | 1,267 | 78.2% | 344 | 21.2% | 9 | 0.6% |
| Logan | 695 | 87.1% | 102 | 12.8% | 1 | 0.1% |
| McHenry | 1,709 | 80.7% | 405 | 19.1% | 3 | 0.1% |
| McIntosh | 904 | 83.1% | 182 | 16.7% | 2 | 0.2% |
| McKenzie | 2,639 | 84.1% | 492 | 15.7% | 8 | 0.3% |
| McLean | 3,215 | 77.2% | 947 | 22.7% | 4 | 0.1% |
| Mercer | 2,959 | 83.9% | 556 | 15.8% | 12 | 0.3% |
| Morton | 8,432 | 76.4% | 2,567 | 23.3% | 32 | 0.3% |
| Mountrail | 1,832 | 70.7% | 756 | 29.2% | 3 | 0.1% |
| Nelson | 1,021 | 68.7% | 463 | 31.2% | 2 | 0.1% |
| Oliver | 693 | 85.3% | 119 | 14.7% | 0 | 0.0% |
| Pembina | 1,909 | 79.2% | 498 | 20.7% | 3 | 0.1% |
| Pierce | 1,141 | 77.8% | 323 | 22.0% | 3 | 0.2% |
| Ramsey | 2,931 | 74.1% | 1,022 | 25.8% | 4 | 0.1% |
| Ransom | 1,140 | 64.2% | 633 | 35.7% | 2 | 0.1% |
| Renville | 732 | 83.8% | 140 | 16.0% | 1 | 0.1% |
| Richland | 4,134 | 71.7% | 1,627 | 28.2% | 1 | 0.1% |
| Rolette | 1,151 | 43.3% | 1,506 | 56.6% | 4 | 0.2% |
| Sargent | 1,040 | 67.0% | 511 | 32.9% | 1 | 0.1% |
| Sheridan | 517 | 84.8% | 91 | 14.9% | 2 | 0.3% |
| Sioux | 190 | 32.8% | 386 | 66.7% | 3 | 0.5% |
| Slope | 273 | 91.9% | 24 | 8.1% | 0 | 0.0% |
| Stark | 7,410 | 84.0% | 1,402 | 15.9% | 10 | 0.1% |
| Steele | 517 | 66.9% | 255 | 33.0% | 1 | 0.1% |
| Stutsman | 4,821 | 74.4% | 1,646 | 25.4% | 16 | 0.2% |
| Towner | 631 | 75.4% | 206 | 24.6% | 0 | 0.0% |
| Traill | 1,982 | 67.7% | 930 | 31.8% | 15 | 0.5% |
| Walsh | 2,624 | 76.7% | 794 | 23.2% | 2 | 0.1% |
| Ward | 12,394 | 75.5% | 3,973 | 24.2% | 51 | 0.3% |
| Wells | 1,342 | 80.9% | 306 | 18.5% | 10 | 0.6% |
| Williams | 6,012 | 83.4% | 1,184 | 16.4% | 14 | 0.2% |
| Totals | 166,517 | 70.9% | 67,609 | 28.8% | 576 | 0.2% |

== See also ==
- North Dakota Attorney General
