= North Dakota State Treasurer =

Political office in North Dakota, US

State Treasurer of North Dakota
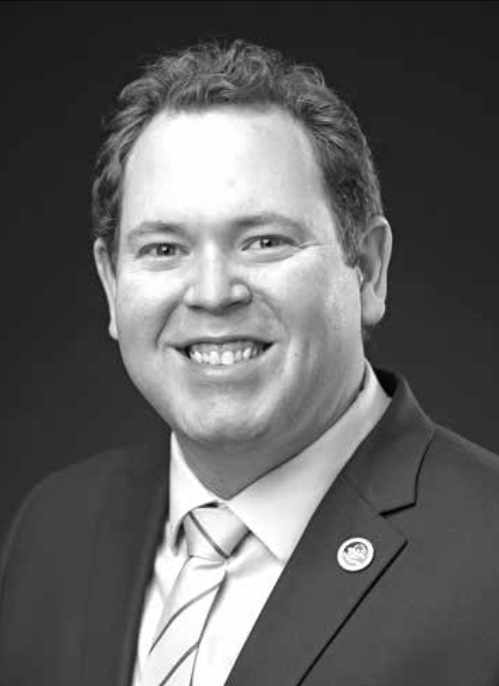
- Incumbent; Thomas Beadle since January 1, 2021
- Office of North Dakota State Treasurer
- Member of: State Board of Equalization; State Historical Board; State Investment Board; Teacher's Fund for Retirement Board; Board of University and School Lands; State Canvassing Board
- Seat: Bismarck, North Dakota
- Term length: Four years
- Constituting instrument: Constitution of North Dakota
- Formation: 1889
- First holder: Lewis E. Booker
- Website: www.nd.gov/treasurer

The North Dakota state treasurer is a political office in North Dakota. The treasurer's duty is to assure sound financial oversight and absolute safety of all public funds collected, managed, and disbursed. The Office of the State Treasurer is separated into five divisions: Administration, Investments, Accounting, Tax Distributions, and Cash Management. The state treasurer is Thomas Beadle, who was elected on November 3, 2020, and took office on January 1, 2021.

== See also ==
- List of North Dakota state treasurers
