= North Dakota State Auditor =

Elected official in the executive branch of North Dakota's state government

State Auditor of North Dakota
- Incumbent; Josh Gallion since January 1, 2017
- Style: Mister or Madam Auditor (informal); The Honorable (formal)
- Seat: North Dakota State Capitol; Bismarck, North Dakota
- Appointer: General election
- Term length: Four years, no term limits
- Formation: November 2, 1889
- First holder: John P. Bray
- Website: www.nd.gov/auditor

The state auditor of North Dakota is an independently elected constitutional officer in the executive branch of government of the U.S. state of North Dakota. Seventeen individuals have occupied the office of state auditor since statehood. The incumbent is Josh Gallion, a Republican.

== History ==
Since the creation of the office with the state's constitution in 1889, the state has seen a total of 17 state auditors. The first eight state auditors all served within the first 25 years of the office's creation, but since then auditors such as Robert W. Peterson, who served for 24 years, have served for longer spans of time. The office has been held by the state's Democratic Party for only two years; from 1893 to 1894 when Arthur W. Porter was elected. All other auditors have been from the North Dakota Republican Party. As of 2026, it has the longest streak of single party rule of any statewide elected office in any state in the United States, being held by the Republican Party since 1895.

The auditor originally served a two-year term, but this was extended to four in 1964 by a constitutional amendment.

== Powers and duties ==
The state auditor is vested by law "with the duties, powers, and responsibilities involved in performing the postaudit of all financial transactions of state government, detecting and reporting any defaults, and determining that expenditures have been made in accordance with law and appropriation acts." Pursuant to this broad mandate, the state auditor is charged with auditing every state agency at least once in every two to four years or oftener as the law requires. Likewise, the state auditor is directed to audit every county, city, school district, and certain other political subdivisions at least once per biennium. The state auditor enjoys unrestricted access to the books and records of all governmental entities in North Dakota and may report to the attorney general the refusal or neglect of any public officer to obey the state auditor in the performance of official duties. Indeed, obstructing or misleading the state auditor is a felony.

== Organization ==
The Office of the State Auditor is organized into the following divisions:

- Local Government Division: Audits counties, cities, towns, school districts, and other political subdivisions, be it directly or through external auditors contracted by auditees and approved by the state auditor. Most audits performed by this division are financial audits, which render an opinion on the presentation of a given government's financial statements. However, the division also provides petition audits, reviews of financial statements, and consulting services. The division is separately responsible for certifying local audit reports completed by independent accounting firms in lieu of the State Auditor's Office. This division is fully funded by the audit fees it collects for services rendered.
- Mineral Royalties Division: Conducts compliance audits of federal royalty payments from oil, gas, and coal leases located within the state.
- State Government Division: Audits the financial statements and disclosures contained in the state of North Dakota's annual comprehensive financial report (ACFR). Likewise, the division audits the schedule of expenditures of federal awards administered by state agencies and their subrecipients. Both the ACFR and statewide single audit are mandatory engagements which occur every year. This division also conducts discretionary operational audits of state agencies' internal controls and compliance, performance audits of state programs, and information technology audits of the state's cybersecurity infrastructure.
- University System Division: Conducts performance audits of the central office and 11 public colleges and universities which altogether comprise the North Dakota University System.

== See also ==
- List of North Dakota state auditors
