= 2022 North Dakota elections =

- November 8, 2022

North Dakota held two statewide elections in 2022: a primary election on Tuesday, June 14, and a general election on Tuesday, November 8. In addition, each township elected officers on Tuesday, March 15, and each school district would hold their elections on a date of their choosing between April 1 and June 30.

== Primary election ==
On Tuesday, June 14, North Dakota voters selected which candidates for statewide and legislative office would appear on the November ballot. Because North Dakota does not have party registration, any eligible voter could vote in any one party's primary election. In addition, any number of constitutional amendments, initiated measures, or referred measures were placed on the ballot by petition or legislative action.

== General election ==
On Tuesday, November 8, concurrent with other statewide elections across the United States, North Dakota voters selected one United States Senator, one United States Representative, Secretary of State, Attorney General, and several other statewide executive and judicial branch offices. Voters in odd-numbered legislative districts also selected their representatives to the North Dakota House of Representatives and North Dakota Senate.

=== Federal offices ===
==== United States Senator ====
Incumbent Republican senator John Hoeven won re-election to a third term. He was re-elected in 2016 with 78.5% of the vote.

==== United States Representative ====
Incumbent Republican representative Kelly Armstrong was re-elected in 2020 with 69.0% of the vote. Armstrong won re-election.

=== State offices ===
==== Secretary of state ====
Incumbent Republican secretary of state Alvin Jaeger was re-elected as an independent in 2018 with 47.3% of the vote.

==== Attorney general ====
Incumbent Republican attorney general Wayne Stenehjem, first elected 2000, was re-elected in 2018 with 67.6% of the vote. Stenehjem had previously said he was not going to run for a seventh term, but died on January 28 prior to the end of his term.

==== Agriculture Commissioner ====
Incumbent Republican Agriculture Commissioner Doug Goehring was re-elected in 2018 with 67.8% of the vote.

==== Tax Commissioner ====
Results by county Rauschenberger: 90–100%

Incumbent Republican Tax Commissioner Ryan Rauschenberger was re-elected in 2018 with 58.6% of the vote.

==== Public Service Commissioner ====
Results by county Fedorchak: 50–60%; 60–70%; 70–80%; 80–90%; 90–100%; Moniz: 50–60%; 60–70%

Special election Results by county Haugen-Hoffart: 50–60%; 60–70%; 70–80%; 80–90%; 90–100%; Hammer: 50–60%; 60–70%

One of three seats in the state Public Service Commission are up for election. Incumbent Republican Julie Fedorchak was re-elected in 2016 with 68.8% of the vote.

==== State legislature ====
24 seats in the North Dakota Senate and 47 seats in the North Dakota House of Representatives were up for election. Voters in all odd-numbered districts saw those races on their ballots. This was the first election affected by the 2020 redistricting cycle.
