= 2006 North Dakota elections =

- November 7, 2006

The state and local elections in North Dakota in 2006 proceeded as follows:

== State offices ==
=== Secretary of State ===
Incumbent Republican North Dakota Secretary of State Al Jaeger defeated Democratic-NPL nominee Kristin Hedger, an aide to Senator Byron Dorgan.

General election results
Party	Candidate	Votes	%	±%
Republican	Al Jaeger (inc.)	115,341	53.92%	−11.24%
Democratic	Kristin Hedger	98,583	46.08%	+11.24%
Majority		16,758	7.83%	−22.49%
Turnout		213,924		
Republican hold		Swing		

Results by county Jaeger: 50–60%; 60–70%; Hedger: 50–60%; 60–70%; 70–80%

=== Attorney General ===
Popular incumbent Republican Attorney General of North Dakota Wayne Stenehjem defeated Democratic-NPL nominee Bill Brudvick, an attorney.

General election results
Party	Candidate	Votes	%	±%
Republican	Wayne Stenehjem (inc.)	148,194	68.86%	−3.68%
Democratic	Bill Brudvik	67,032	31.14%	+3.68%
Majority		81,162	37.71%	−7.37%
Turnout		215,226		
Republican hold		Swing		

Results by county Stenehjem: 50–60%; 60–70%; 70–80%; Brudvik: 50–60%; 60–70%

=== Agriculture Commissioner ===
2006 North Dakota Agriculture Commissioner election
- November 7, 2006
Nominee	Roger Johnson	Doug Goehring
Party	Democratic–NPL	Republican
Popular vote	119,812	94,736
Percentage	55.84%	44.16%
- County results Johnson: 50–60% 60–70% 70–80% 80–90% Goehring: 50–60%
Agriculture Commissioner before election
Roger Johnson
Democratic–NPL
Elected Agriculture Commissioner
Roger Johnson
Democratic–NPL

Incumbent Democratic-NPL North Dakota Agriculture Commissioner Roger Johnson defeated 2004 Republican) nominee Doug Goehring in a rematch.

General election results
Party	Candidate	Votes	%	±%
Democratic	Roger Johnson (inc.)	119,812	55.84%	+5.52%
Republican	Doug Goehring	94,736	44.16%	−5.52%
Majority		25,076	11.69%	+11.05%
Turnout		214,548		
Democratic hold		Swing		

=== Public Service Commissioner ===
Incumbent Republican North Dakota Public Service Commissioner Tony Clark defeated Democratic-NPL nominee Cheryl Bergian, a former candidate for the North Dakota State Senate.

General election results
Party	Candidate	Votes	%	±%
Republican	Tony Clark (inc.)	110,002	52.32%	−13.17%
Democratic	Cheryl Bergian	100,233	47.68%	+13.17%
Majority		9,769	4.64%	−26.34%
Turnout		210,235		
Republican hold		Swing		

Results by county Clark: 50–60%; 60–70%; Bergian: 50–60%; 60–70%; 70–80%

=== Tax Commissioner ===
Incumbent Republican North Dakota Tax Commissioner Cory Fong defeated Democratic-NPL nominee Brent Edison, the 2004 Democratic-NPL nominee for North Dakota State Auditor.

General election results
Party	Candidate	Votes	%	±%
Republican	Cory Fong (inc.)	112,154	53.05%	−16.12%
Democratic	Brent Edison	99,243	46.95%	+16.12%
Majority		12,911	6.10%	−32.24%
Turnout		211,397		
Republican hold		Swing		

Results by county Fong: 50–60%; 60–70%; Edison: 50–60%; 60–70%; 70–80%

== Ballot measures ==
=== Constitutional Measure 1 ===
This ballot measure made proposed changes to policy relating to public school trust funds.

Constitutional Measure No. 1
Choice	Votes	%
For	128,800	67.23
Against	62,772	32.77
Total	191,572	100.00

Measure 1 results by county Yes: 70–80%; 60–70%; 50–60%; No: 60–70%; 50–60%

=== Initiated Constitutional Measure 2 ===
This ballot measure prohibited the use of land taken by eminent domain for any future private use, with exceptions of public utilities and common carriers.

Initiated Constitutional Measure No. 2
Choice	Votes	%
For	137,660	67.49
Against	66,302	32.51
Total	203,962	100.00

Measure 2 results by county Yes: 70–80%; 60–70%; 50–60%; No: 50–60%

=== Statutory Measure 3 ===
This ballot measure would have made changes to family law concerning child custody, child support, and other issues.

Statutory Measure No. 3
Choice	Votes	%
For	91,225	43.59
Against	118,048	56.41
Total	209,273	100.00

Measure 3 results by county No: 60–70%; 50–60%; Yes: 60–70%; 50–60%

== Legislature Summary ==
In the North Dakota House of Representatives, the North Dakota Democratic-NPL Party gained six seats, to total 33, while the Republicans hold all of the remaining 61 seats. In the North Dakota Senate, the North Dakota Democratic-NPL Party gained six seats, to total 21, while the Republicans hold all of the remaining 26 seats.
