= 2010 North Dakota elections =

- November 2, 2010

A general election was held in the U.S. state of North Dakota on Tuesday, November 2, 2010, with primary elections being held on June 8, 2010.

== U.S. Congress ==
=== Senate ===
Incumbent Democrat Byron Dorgan was eligible to run for re-election to a fourth term but announced in January 2010 that he would not seek reelection, citing his desire to retire and pursue other interests outside of public life. Tracy Potter, a state senator representing Bismarck, won the Democratic-NPL primary while incumbent Governor John Hoeven won the Republican primary and Keith Hanson, a software engineer from West Fargo, won the Libertarian primary. On November 2, 2010, Hoeven won the general election in a landslide with 76.08% of the vote.

United States Senate election in North Dakota, 2010
Party	Candidate	Votes	%	±%
Republican	John Hoeven	181,689	76.08%	+44.36%
Democratic–NPL	Tracy Potter	52,955	22.17%	−46.11%
Libertarian	Keith Hanson	3,890	1.63%	N/A
Total votes		238,534	100.00%	N/A
Republican gain from Democratic–NPL				

=== House of Representatives ===
Incumbent Democrat Earl Pomeroy, who had represented North Dakota in the United States House of Representatives since 1993, ran for re-election and was defeated by Republican nominee Rick Berg, a state representative from Fargo.

United States House of Representatives election in North Dakota, 2010
Party	Candidate	Votes	%
Republican	Rick Berg	129,802	54.74%
Democratic–NPL	Earl Pomeroy (incumbent)	106,542	44.93%
Write-in		793	0.33%
Total votes		237,137	100.00%
Republican gain from Democratic–NPL			

== Statewide constitutional offices ==
=== Secretary of State ===
2010 North Dakota Secretary of State election
- November 2, 2010
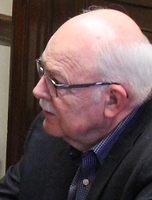

Nominee	Alvin Jaeger	Corey Mock
Party	Republican	Democratic–NPL
Popular vote	145,882	87,519
Percentage	62.44%	37.46%
- County results Jeager: 50–60% 60–70% 70–80% 80–90% Mock: 50–60% 60–70%
Secretary of State before election
Alvin Jaeger
Republican
Elected Secretary of State
Alvin Jaeger
Republican

Incumbent Republican Alvin Jaeger ran for re-election to a sixth term as North Dakota Secretary of State and defeated a challenge from Democratic nominee Corey Mock, a state representative from Grand Forks. Jaeger was endorsed by the Grand Forks Herald while Mock was endorsed by The Bismarck Tribune and the AFL–CIO. During the campaign, Jaeger faced criticism over his office's mishandling of a candidate's campaign filings which resulted in them being mistakenly omitted from the June 8 primary election ballot.

North Dakota Secretary of State election, 2010
Party	Candidate	Votes	%
Republican	Alvin Jaeger (incumbent)	145,882	62.44%
Democratic–NPL	Corey Mock	87,519	37.46%
Write-in		222	0.1%
Total votes		233,623	100.00%
Republican hold			

=== Attorney General ===
2010 North Dakota Attorney General election
- November 2, 2010
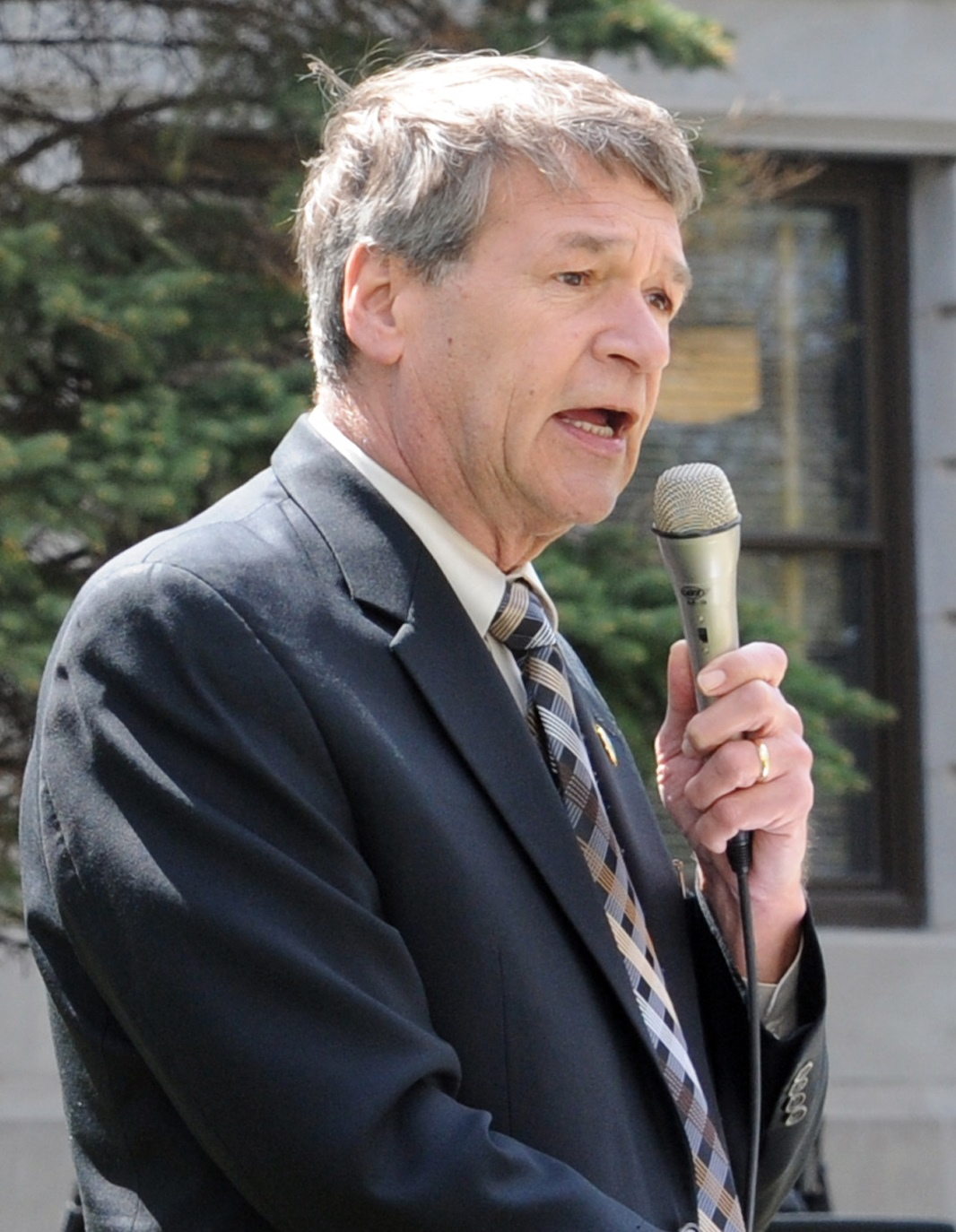

Nominee	Wayne Stenehjem	Jeanette Boechler
Party	Republican	Democratic–NPL
Popular vote	175,627	59,781
Percentage	74.55%	25.38%
- County results Stenehjem: 50–60% 60–70% 70–80% 80–90% Boechler: 50–60%
Attorney General before election
Wayne Stenehjem
Republican
Elected Attorney General
Wayne Stenehjem
Republican

Incumbent Republican Wayne Stenehjem ran for re-election to a fourth term as North Dakota Attorney General and defeated a challenge from Democratic nominee Jeanette Boechler, a personal injury lawyer from Fargo.

North Dakota Attorney General election, 2010
Party	Candidate	Votes	%
Republican	Wayne Stenehjem (incumbent)	175,627	74.55%
Democratic–NPL	Jeanette Boechler	59,781	25.38%
Write-in		174	0.07%
Total votes		235,582	100.00%
Republican hold			

=== Agriculture Commissioner ===
2010 North Dakota Agriculture Commissioner election
- November 2, 2010
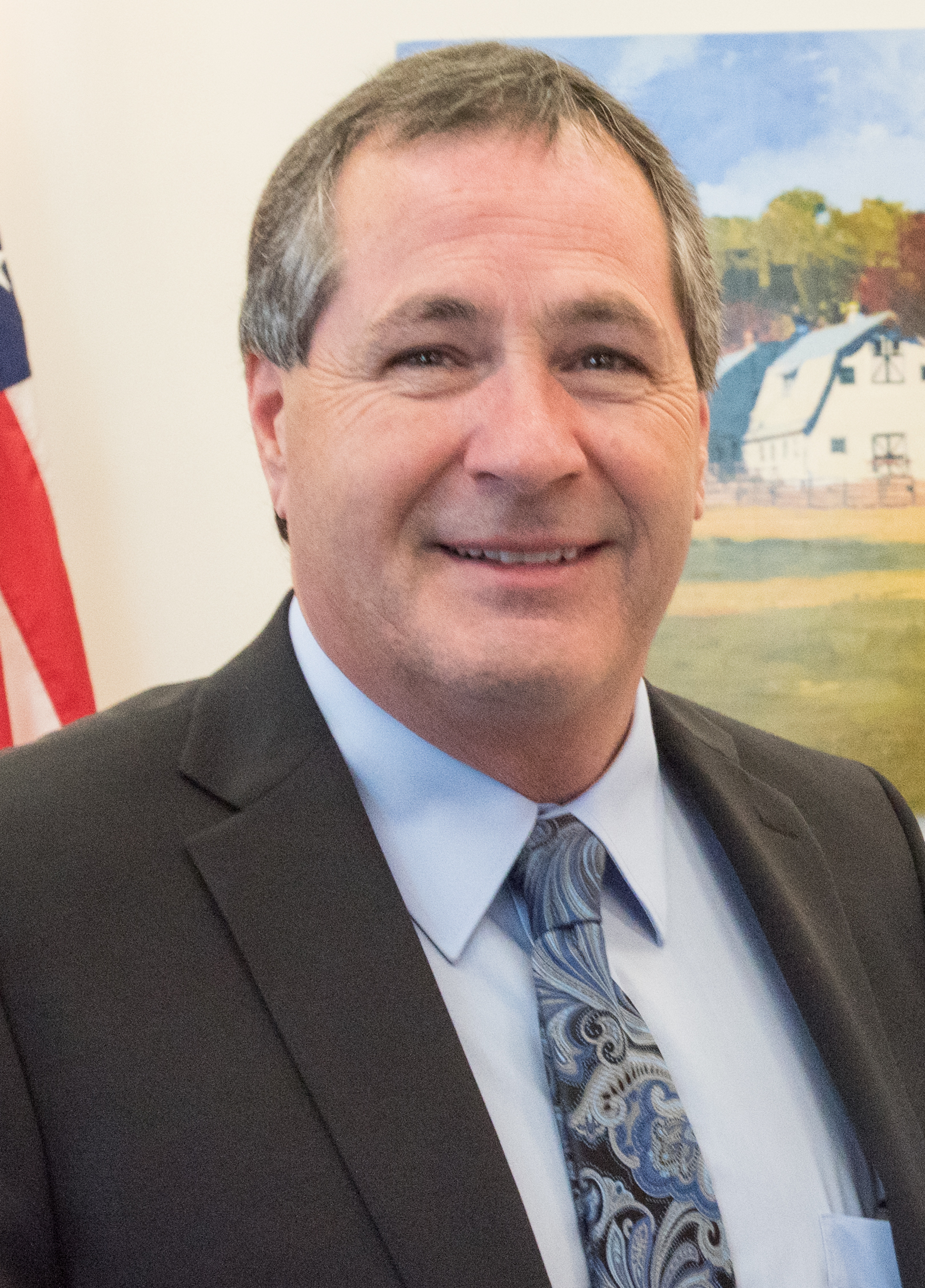

Nominee	Doug Goehring	Merle Boucher
Party	Republican	Democratic–NPL
Popular vote	157,867	74,143
Percentage	67.98%	31.93%
- County results Goehring: 50–60% 60–70% 70–80% 80–90% Boucher: 50–60% 60–70% 80–90%
Agriculture Commissioner before election
Doug Goehring
Republican
Elected Agriculture Commissioner
Doug Goehring
Republican

Incumbent Republican Doug Goehring ran for election to his first full term as North Dakota Agriculture Commissioner and defeated a challenge from Democratic nominee Merle Boucher, the Democratic minority leader of the North Dakota House of Representatives from Rolette.

North Dakota Agriculture Commissioner election, 2010
Party	Candidate	Votes	%
Republican	Doug Goehring (incumbent)	157,867	67.98%
Democratic–NPL	Merle Boucher	74,143	31.93%
Write-in		216	0.09%
Total votes		232,226	100.00%
Republican hold			

=== Tax Commissioner ===
2010 North Dakota Tax Commissioner election
- November 2, 2010
Nominee	Cory Fong	Cynthia Kaldor	Richard Flattum-Riemers
Party	Republican	Democratic–NPL	Libertarian
Popular vote	156,520	67,856	7,716
Percentage	67.39%	29.22%	3.32%
- County results Fong: 40–50% 50–60% 60–70% 70–80% 80–90% Kaldor: 50–60% 60–70%
Tax Commissioner before election
Cory Fong
Republican
Elected Tax Commissioner
Cory Fong
Republican

Incumbent Republican Cory Fong ran for re-election to a second term as North Dakota Tax Commissioner and defeated challenges from Democratic nominee Cynthia Kaldor, a businesswoman and former member of the North Dakota State Board of Higher Education from Mayville, and Libertarian nominee Richard Flattum-Riemers.

North Dakota Tax Commissioner election, 2010
Party	Candidate	Votes	%
Republican	Cory Fong (incumbent)	156,520	67.39%
Democratic–NPL	Cynthia Kaldor	67,856	29.22%
Libertarian	Richard Flattum-Riemers	7,716	3.32%
Write-in		160	0.07%
Total votes		232,252	100.00%
Republican hold			

== State Legislature ==
=== State Senate ===
One-half of the seats of the North Dakota Senate are up for election in 2010.

=== State House of Representatives ===
One-half of the seats in the North Dakota House of Representatives are up for election in 2010.

== Judicial positions ==
Results by county Kapsner: 90–100%

Multiple judicial positions will be up for election in 2010.

- North Dakota judicial elections, 2010 at Judgepedia

== Ballot measures ==
One measure has been certified, and at least ten initiatives are pending.

- North Dakota 2010 ballot measures at Ballotpedia

Measure 1 results by county Yes: 70–80%; 60–70%; 50–60%; No: 60–70%; 50–60%

Initiated Statutory 2 results by county No: 80–90%; 70–80%; 60–70%; 50–60%; Yes: 50–60%

== Local ==
Many elections for county offices were held on November 2, 2010.
