= Senator Stenehjem =

Senator Stenehjem may refer to:

- Bob Stenehjem (1952–2011), North Dakota State Senate
- Wayne Stenehjem (1953–2022), North Dakota State Senate
