= Ray Holmberg =

American criminal, politician, and educator (born 1944)

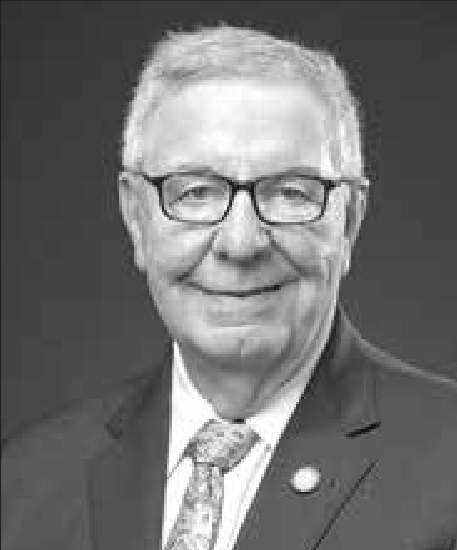
- Holmberg in 2021

Member of the North Dakota Senate from the 17th district
- In office December 1, 1976 – June 1, 2022
- Preceded by: Seat established
- Succeeded by: Jonathan Sickler

Personal details
- Born: Raymon Everett Holmberg; December 10, 1944 (age 81)
- Party: Republican
- Spouse: Kerry Louise Hackett (m. 1973; div. 1986)
- Children: 2
- Occupation: Educator; counselor; legislator; chairman
- Criminal information
- Other names: Sean Evan; Sean Evans
- Status: Imprisoned at FMC Rochester; earliest possible release May 8, 2033
- Conviction: August 8, 2024 (pleaded guilty)
- Criminal charges: Child sex tourism
- Penalty: 10 years in prison, 10 years supervised release, lifetime registration as sex offender

Signature
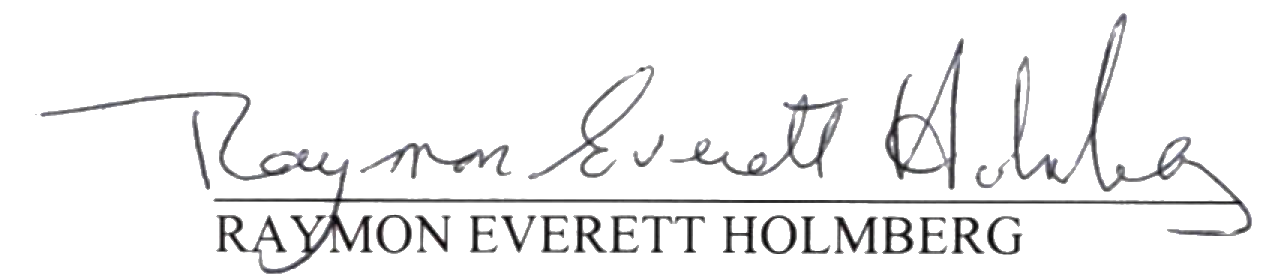

Raymon Everett Holmberg (born December 10, 1944) is an American former politician and convicted child sex offender. A former educator and school counselor, he served in the North Dakota state senate from 1976 until 2022 as a member of the Republican Party. He was tied for the longest-serving state legislator in the United States by the time of his resignation.

Holmberg resigned from the Senate in 2022 (after 45.5 years) upon investigation into his child sex tourism and receipt of child pornography. In 2024, he pleaded guilty to the sex tourism charges, and in 2025 was sentenced to ten years imprisonment.

== Personal life ==
Raymon Everett Holmberg was born on December 10, 1944. He had at least one sibling, a sister. He attended Climax High School in Climax, Minnesota, and was one of 26 senior-class students in the 1960–1961 academic year. He married Kerry Louise Hackett (born 1950 or 1951) of Grand Forks, North Dakota on April 27, 1973 and they divorced in mid-1986. As of 2013, Holmberg had two children and five grandchildren. In December 2020, he contracted COVID-19 and was treated with a convalescent plasma injection.

== Career ==
=== Education ===
From 1967 to 2002, Holmberg worked for Grand Forks Public Schools as a teacher, "child find coordinator" and school counselor. On November 2, 2023, a North Dakota Department of Public Instruction panel voted unanimously to suspend his lifetime teaching license with a plan "to revoke it immediately if he pleads guilty to or is convicted of any charge" in his 2023 criminal case.

He was also previously a chairman of the Western Interstate Commission for Higher Education.

=== Politics ===
Holmberg was first elected as a Republican to the North Dakota Senate in 1976 and took office that December 1, representing District 17 ("Grand Forks south of 32nd Avenue South, neighborhoods along the Red River and large areas west and south of the city"). He was to have been one of North Dakota's three electors for certifying the 2020 United States presidential election but got replaced after contracting COVID-19.

For many years in office, Holmberg chaired both the senate's appropriations committee (which wrote budgets) and legislative management panel (which handled the legislature's business between biennial sessions). While on a 2021 legislative committee to redistrict the state, Holmberg rejected a map drawing a Native American-majority district, saying it was to avoid gerrymandering. The approved redistricting map was ruled a violation of the Voting Rights Act in 2023 by Judge Peter D. Welte in the United States District Court for the District of North Dakota.

After the 2021 retirement of Fred Risser of the Wisconsin Senate, Holmberg was tied with Nikki G. Setzler of the South Carolina Senate for longest-serving state legislator in the United States. In 2021, Holmberg was the Grand Forks Herald's person of the year. In 2022, he was chairman of the Senate's Appropriations, Rules and Legislative Management committees while also serving on the interim Budget Section; The Forum of Fargo-Moorhead called Holmberg "one of the most powerful and popular lawmakers in the legislature". From 2013 through mid-2022, Holmberg spent more state money on travel than any other legislator (US$125,810).

In June 2021, Holmberg raised about $20,000 (equivalent to about $24,000 in 2025) for his 2022 reelection campaign. In March 2022, Holmberg announced he would not seek reelection that year due to "health issues including weakened cognitive abilities". After an investigation was published about his communications with an inmate accused of child pornography crimes, Holmberg resigned from the Senate six months early, on June 1, 2022. He was replaced by Jonathan Sickler. Despite no longer working in the North Dakota State Capitol as of November 2023, Holmberg was still active in politics: offering advice and meeting with legislators to share access to his institutional knowledge, soliciting support for Republican candidates and corresponding with politicos.

==== Electoral history ====
2010, primary, North Dakota state senate, 17th District
Party	Candidate	Votes	%
Republican	Ray Holmberg	1,198	99.34
Republican	Write-in candidate(s)	8	0.66

2010, general, North Dakota state senate, 17th District
Party	Candidate	Votes	%
Republican	Ray Holmberg	4,088	67.91
Democratic–NPL	Thomas Petros	1,915	31.81
	Write-in candidate(s)	17	0.28

2014, primary, North Dakota state senate, 17th District
Party	Candidate	Votes	%
Republican	Ray Holmberg	784	99.87
Republican	Write-in candidate(s)	1	0.13

2014, general, North Dakota state senate, 17th District
Party	Candidate	Votes	%
Republican	Ray Holmberg	4,869	97.97
	Write-in candidate(s)	101	2.03

2018, primary, North Dakota state senate, 17th District
Party	Candidate	Votes	%
Republican	Ray Holmberg	1,519	99.67
Republican	Write-in candidate(s)	5	0.33

2018, general, North Dakota state senate, 17th District
Party	Candidate	Votes	%
Republican	Ray Holmberg	5,176	59.03
Democratic–NPL	Phyllis E Johnson	3,584	40.87
	Write-in candidate(s)	9	0.10

== Criminal charges ==
=== Background ===
In 2020, Caton Todd (formerly of North Dakota) alleged he was sexually assaulted by Holmberg in 2010 after getting invited to the senator's Miami-area condominium. Holmberg's attorney later confirmed the two men "were acquainted and spent time together" and that Holmberg owned the condo.

Arrested in March 2021, Nicholas James Morgan-DeRosier (from East Grand Forks, Minnesota, born 1988 or 1989) was indicted ten months later on charges of "receiving and distributing sexual abuse material, transporting child sexual abuse material, transporting minors with intent for those children to engage in sexual activity and traveling with intent to engage in illicit sexual activity". Court documents listed Morgan-DeRosier having over 6,500 images and videos of child sexual abuse material.

On August 23, 2021, while Morgan-DeRosier was incarcerated in the Grand Forks County, North Dakota jail on the possession charges, he texted Holmberg and the two exchanged 65 messages between 3:23 and 5:24 p.m., in part discussing Holmberg's interest in meeting Morgan-DeRosier's 19-or-20-year-old boyfriend "to give him a massage". The next day, Holmberg texted Morgan-DeRosier and seven messages were passed back and forth between 6:14 and 6:31 p.m. Morgan-DeRosier was bailed out at 9:14 p.m. on August 24. These text exchanges came to light as federal prosecutor Jennifer Klemetsrud Puhl's evidence at Morgan-DeRosier's detention hearing. When The Forum of Fargo-Moorhead uncovered this connection and asked Holmberg about them, the legislator said the messages were about patio construction, claimed ignorance of the massage-related messages and both claimed to have read about Morgan-DeRosier's charges while also not knowing about them. He later told The Forum of his texts with Morgan-DeRosier, "They're just gone." Morgan-DeRosier pleaded guilty to "seven criminal charges related to possessing and distributing child pornography" in September 2023. On May 30, 2024, Judge Peter D. Welte imposed a sentence of 40 years imprisonment, victim restitution of $39,000 (equivalent to $40,026 in 2025) and mandatory registration as a sex offender.

At 9:30 a.m. on November 17, 2021, Holmberg's Grand Forks condominium was searched by the federal Department of Homeland Security and the Grand Forks Police Department. Holmberg was interviewed by agents and evidentiary material was seized from his home, including CD-Rs, DVD-Rs, and Holmberg's state-issued iPad and laptop computer. Evidence led to an email account belonging to Holmberg, which he used to plan his trips, saying "The boys rent at around $60 (sex is extra)" and "No one is ever too young ...remember Prague."

Prosecutors ultimately determined that, as part of state-funded trips—in cooperation with Atlantik-Brücke to "understand and integrate the various facets of international politics, business, academia and culture"—Holmberg took at least three individual trips to Prague, Czech Republic (June 24, 2011; September 29, 2018; and late June 2019) to illegally have sex with minors. With his senatorial leadership position, Holmberg approved state reimbursement of $126,000 of his own personal travel expenses to Prague.

=== Federal indictment and trial ===
A grand jury in the US District Court for North Dakota returned an indictment against Holmberg on October 26, 2023 (United States of America v. Raymon Everett Holmberg). Holmberg was also indicted for receiving or attempting to receive child pornography (between November 24, 2012, and March 4, 2013); Jennifer Puhl testified that Holmberg used the aliases Sean Evan and Sean Evans "to convince a child to send him sexually explicit images".

Arrested and arraigned on October 30, Holmberg pled not-guilty at the US District Court in Fargo, North Dakota. Judge Alice Senechal released Holmberg under the conditions: forfeiture of his passport; no contact with minors, victims, and witnesses; no access to the internet, no travel outside Greater Grand Forks or Fargo; and no possession of firearms. Senechal set a trial date of December 5, 2023, to be adjudicated by Judge Daniel L. Hovland. On November 14, upon request of Holmberg's defense team, and with no objection from the federal prosecutor, Hovland postponed the Fargo trial to April 29, which was expected to last five days; in March 2024, it was delayed again until September 9.

On August 8, pursuant to a plea agreement (United States of America v. Raymon Everett Holmberg), Holmberg pled guilty to child sex tourism charges stemming from his travel to the Czech Republic and waived his right to appeal; in exchange, the United States Department of Justice (DOJ) agreed to drop charges of receiving child pornography and attempts there to, and would "seek a sentence on the low end of sentencing guidelines." The maximum sentence was 30 years imprisonment and $250,000 in fines, and he will be required to register as a sex offender. Holmberg's allocution additionally included admissions of sex quid pro quo, receipt and consumption of child pornography. Due to Holmberg's health problems, Judge Hovland released him from custody with a GPS tracker, pending sentencing, despite previous violations of his terms of release. There is no required minimum sentencing.

=== Post-conviction and sentencing ===
On October 10, 2024, the U.S. Probation and Pretrial Services System reported that Holmberg had again violated the terms of his pretrial release, this time by repeatedly accessing social media and leaving home multiple times without prior approval. On October 29, Hovland revoked Holmberg's pretrial release and ordered him to report to jail by November 1 (United States of America v. Raymon Holmberg). That day, Holmberg surrendered to the United States Marshals Service and was imprisoned in Elk River, Minnesota.

Federal sentencing guidelines recommended a sentence of 37–46 months and both the defense and prosecution agreed to 37 months ("about three years") due to Holmberg's age and concerns about his health. On March 26, 2025, Hovland instead sentenced Holmberg to 10 years (120 months). Although this was three times what both the prosecution and defense had sought, Hovland said upward departure from sentencing guidelines was warranted because he believed Holmberg was still a "threat to underage boys". Hovland also did not believe the recommended sentence would deter others: in his view, a three-year sentence was too lenient for "very vile, very sickening behavior". Hovland did not believe Holmberg's claims that he had never had sex with minors, saying he could "read between the lines". Acting U. S. Attorney Jennifer Klemetsrud Puhl said that she would have asked for a longer sentence if her office had been able to identify more victims in Prague. Holmberg was returned to the Elk River jail pending his assignment by the Federal Bureau of Prisons. On June 5, 2025, Holmberg, BOP Register Number 8357-510, was transferred to Federal Medical Center, Rochester. His earliest possible release date is May 5, 2033.

After sentencing, the North Dakota Legislative Assembly released a statement that said:

The ND Senate and ND House are committed to providing additional resources to law enforcement to help combat increases in criminal sexual assaults and human trafficking…Ray Holmberg's evil crimes require reflection and careful review of policy to determine how best to combat crimes against children. In the coming months, we intend to do that with sober judgment and a firm resolve.

Hovland required Holmberg to serve a further 10 years of supervised release after Holmberg completes his prison sentence. He will also be required to register as a sex offender and complete a sex offender treatment program. He will be prohibited from visiting where children gather (e.g. playgrounds and schools) and will have to get permission from his probation officer before having any contact with minors at all.
