= Lee Nichols =

Lee Nichols (or variants) may refer to:

- Lee Nichols (tax commissioner), see the list of North Dakota tax commissioners
- Leigh Nichols, pen name of Dean Koontz
- Lee Nicholls, footballer

== See also ==
- Lee Nicol, victim of Hillsborough Disaster
