= 2000 North Dakota Attorney General election =

- November 7, 2000
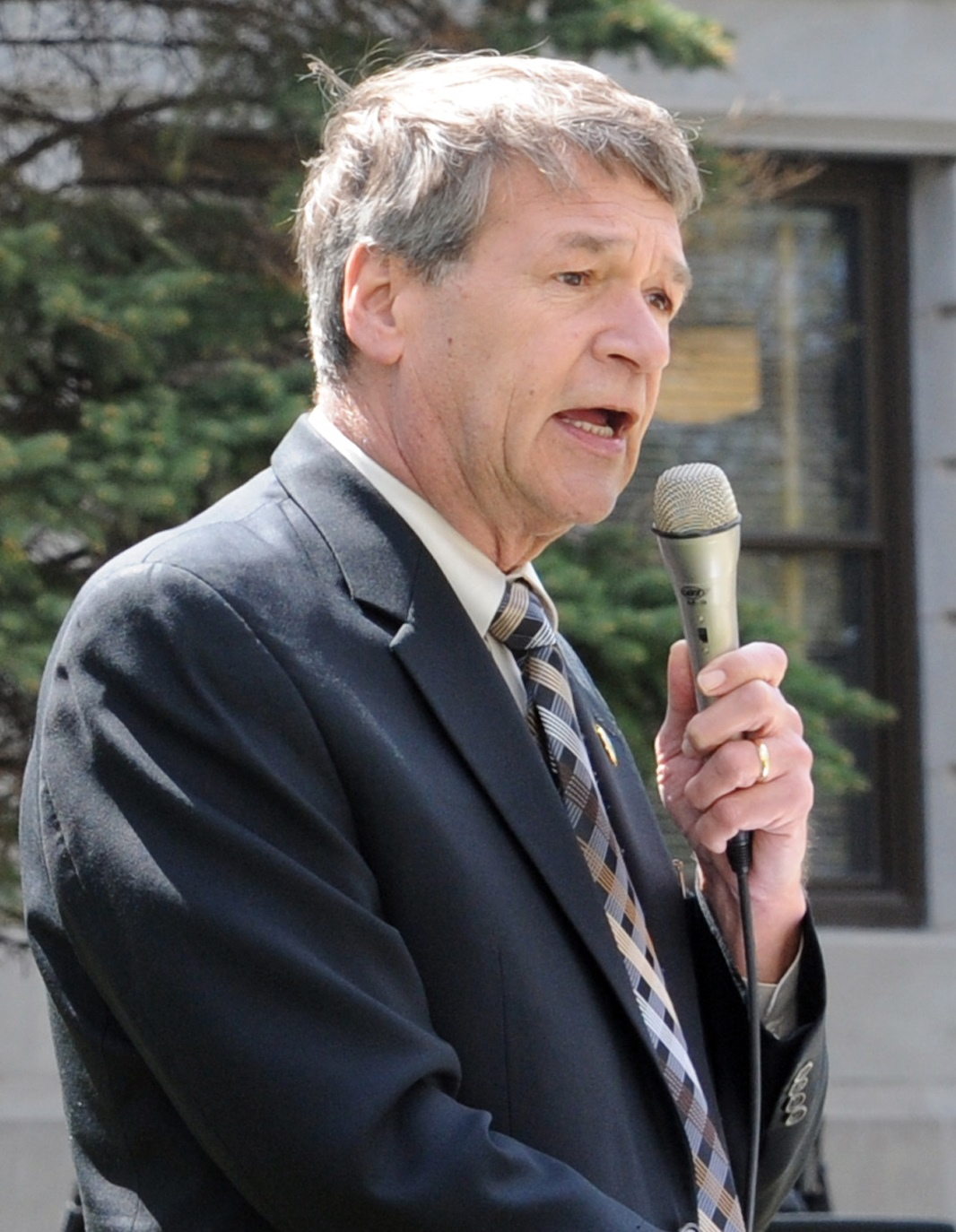

Nominee	Wayne Stenehjem	Glenn Pomeroy
Party	Republican	Democratic–NPL
Popular vote	157,986	125,466
Percentage	55.74%	44.26%
- County results Stenehjem: 50–60% 60–70% Pomeroy: 50–60% 60–70% 70–80%
Attorney General before election
Heidi Heitkamp
Democratic–NPL
Elected Attorney General
Wayne Stenehjem
Republican

The 2000 North Dakota Attorney General election was held on November 7, 2000, to elect the North Dakota Attorney General. Democratic-NPL incumbent Heidi Heitkamp chose to unsuccessfully run for governor rather than seek a third term. Republican North Dakota state senator Wayne Stenehjem won the election, defeating Democratic North Dakota Insurance Commissioner Glenn Pomeroy by eleven percentage points.

As of 2026, this is the last time a Democratic-NPL candidate has received more than 40% of the vote in an attorney general election.

== Democratic-NPL primary ==
=== Candidates ===
- Glenn Pomeroy, North Dakota Insurance Commissioner (1993–2000)

=== Results ===
Democratic–NPL primary results
Party	Candidate	Votes	%
Democratic–NPL	Glenn Pomeroy	34,461	100.00%
Total votes		34,461	100.00%

== Republican primary ==
=== Candidates ===
- Wayne Stenehjem, North Dakota state senator (1980–2000)

=== Results ===
Republican primary results
Party	Candidate	Votes	%
Republican	Wayne Stenehjem	37,556	100.00%
Total votes		37,556	100.00%

== General election ==
=== Candidates ===
- Wayne Stenehjem, North Dakota state senator (1980–2000) (Republican)
- Glenn Pomeroy, North Dakota Insurance Commissioner (1993–2000) (Democratic)

=== Results ===
2000 North Dakota Attorney General election results
Party	Candidate	Votes	%	±%
Republican	Wayne Stenehjem	157,986	55.74%	+19.56%
Democratic–NPL	Glenn Pomeroy	125,466	44.26%	−19.56%
Total votes		283,452	100.00%	
Republican gain from Democratic–NPL				
