= 2014 North Dakota elections =

- November 4, 2014

A general election was held in the U.S. state of North Dakota on November 4, 2014. Five of North Dakota's executive officers were up for election as well as the state's at-large seat in the United States House of Representatives. Primary elections were held on June 10, 2014.

== Attorney General ==
Results by county Stenehjem: 60–70%; 70–80%; 80–90%; Kraus-Parr: 50–60%

Incumbent Republican Attorney General Wayne Stenehjem, who has served in the office since January 1, 2001, was re-elected to a fifth term.

Kiara Kraus-Parr, an attorney and adjunct law professor at the University of North Dakota, ran for the seat on behalf of the Democrats.

North Dakota Attorney General election, 2014
| Party | Candidate | Votes | % |
|---|---|---|---|
| Republican | Wayne Stenehjem | 181,678 | 74.06 |
| Democratic–NPL | Kiara Kraus-Parr | 63,255 | 25.78 |
| Write-in | | 395 | 0.16 |
| Total votes | | 245,328 | 100.00 |
| Republican hold | | | |

== Secretary of State ==
Results by county Jaeger: 40–50%; 50–60%; 60–70%; 70–80%; Fairfield: 60–70%

Incumbent Republican Secretary of State Alvin Jaeger, who has served in the office since January 1, 1993, was re-elected to a sixth term.

Non-profit director, former state representative, and former state senator April Fairfield ran for the Democrats. Businessman, perennial candidate, and Chairman of the Libertarian Party of North Dakota Roland Riemers ran for the Libertarians.

North Dakota Secretary of State election, 2014
| Party | Candidate | Votes | % |
|---|---|---|---|
| Republican | Alvin Jaeger | 152,085 | 62.39 |
| Democratic–NPL | April Fairfield | 78,474 | 32.19 |
| Libertarian | Roland Riemers | 12,920 | 5.30 |
| Write-in | | 278 | 0.11 |
| Total votes | | 243,757 | 100.00 |
| Republican hold | | | |

== Commissioner of Agriculture ==
Incumbent Republican Agriculture Commissioner Doug Goehring, who has served in the office since April 6, 2009, was re-elected to a second term.

Goehring was the only Republican or Democrat to face a contested nomination for any statewide position. After he made insensitive comments to female staffers, farmer and nurse Judy Estenson challenged him for the Republican nomination. The North Dakota Farm Bureau, which Goehring was a former vice president of, opposed his bid for re-election, and he announced that if did not win the Republican endorsement, he would run in the primary in June, though he ruled out running as an independent in the general election. At the Republican convention on April 6, 2014, Goehring defeated Estenson by 624 votes to 245.

Rancher, former state senator and 2012 gubernatorial nominee Ryan Taylor ran against Goehring for the Democrats.

Goehring raised more money but Taylor, who ran on a platform of tighter regulation of the state's oil industry, is a strong campaigner and kept the race tight.

| Poll source | Date(s) administered | Sample size | Margin of error | Doug Goehring (R) | Ryan Taylor (D) | Other | Undecided |
|---|---|---|---|---|---|---|---|
| Mellman Group (Note: Poll for the North Dakota Democratic-Nonpartisan League Party) | May 5–8, 2014 | 600 | ± 4% | 36% | 36% | — | 28% |

Results by county Goehring: 50–60%; 60–70%; 70–80%; Taylor: 50–60%; 60–70%; 70–80%

North Dakota Agriculture Commissioner election, 2014
| Party | Candidate | Votes | % |
|---|---|---|---|
| Republican | Doug Goehring | 139,597 | 56.96 |
| Democratic–NPL | Ryan Taylor | 105,094 | 42.88 |
| Write-in | | 377 | 0.15 |
| Total votes | | 245,068 | 100.00 |
| Republican hold | | | |

== Tax Commissioner ==
Results by county Rauschenberger: 40–50%; 50–60%; 60–70%; 70–80%; Astrup: 40–50%; 50–60%; 60–70%

Incumbent Republican Tax Commissioner Ryan Rauschenberger, who was appointed to the office on January 1, 2014, after Republican incumbent Cory Fong resigned to join the private sector, was elected to a first full term.

Democratic attorney Jason Astrup and Libertarian television producer Anthony Mangnall also ran for the office.

North Dakota Tax Commissioner election, 2014
| Party | Candidate | Votes | % |
|---|---|---|---|
| Republican | Ryan Rauschenberger | 135,329 | 56.76 |
| Democratic–NPL | Jason Astrup | 87,516 | 36.71 |
| Libertarian | Anthony Mangnall | 15,238 | 6.39 |
| Write-in | | 344 | 0.14 |
| Total votes | | 238,427 | 100.00 |
| Republican hold | | | |

== Public Service Commission ==
Two of the three seats on the North Dakota Public Service Commission were up for election.

Incumbent Republican Commissioner 2 Julie Fedorchak, who was appointed to the position in January 2013 after Kevin Cramer resigned to join the House of Representatives, was elected in a special election to fill the remaining two years of the term. State Senator Tyler Axness ran for the Democrats.

Results by county Fedorchak: 50–60%; 60–70%; 70–80%; 80–90%; Axness: 50–60%; 60–70%

North Dakota Public Service Commissioner 2 special election, 2014
| Party | Candidate | Votes | % |
|---|---|---|---|
| Republican | Julie Fedorchak | 156,596 | 65.99 |
| Democratic–NPL | Tyler Axness | 80,319 | 33.84 |
| Write-in | | 401 | 0.17 |
| Total votes | | 237,316 | 100.00 |
| Republican hold | | | |

Incumbent Republican Commissioner 3 Brian Kalk, the chairman of the commission, was re-elected to a second term in office. Democratic businessman Todd Reisenauer also ran.

Results by county Kalk: 50–60%; 60–70%; 70–80%; 80–90%; Reisenauer: 60–70%

North Dakota Public Service Commissioner 3 election, 2014
| Party | Candidate | Votes | % |
|---|---|---|---|
| Republican | Brian Kalk | 154,409 | 64.79 |
| Democratic–NPL | Todd Reisenauer | 83,557 | 35.06 |
| Write-in | | 370 | 0.16 |
| Total votes | | 238,336 | 100.00 |
| Republican hold | | | |

== United States House of Representatives ==
North Dakota's at-large seat in the United States House of Representatives was also up for election in 2014. Voters re-elected Republican incumbent representative Kevin Cramer for the position.

North Dakota's at-large congressional district election, 2014
| Party | Candidate | Votes | % |
|---|---|---|---|
| Republican | Kevin Cramer | 138,100 | 55.54 |
| Democratic–NPL | George B. Sinner | 95,678 | 38.48 |
| Libertarian | Jack Seaman | 14,531 | 5.84 |
| Write-in | | 361 | 0.15 |
| Total votes | | 248,670 | 100.00 |
| Republican hold | | | |

== North Dakota Legislative Assembly ==
All odd-numbered legislative districts elected one Senator and two Representatives each to the North Dakota Legislative Assembly:

North Dakota Senate
| Party | Before | After | Change |
|---|---|---|---|
| Republican | 33 | 32 | ▼1 |
| Democratic-NPL | 14 | 15 | ▲1 |
| Total | 47 | 47 | |

North Dakota House of Representatives
| Party | Before | After | Change |
|---|---|---|---|
| Republican | 71 | 71 | Steady |
| Democratic-NPL | 23 | 23 | Steady |
| Total | 94 | 94 | |
