= 2004 North Dakota Attorney General election =

- November 2, 2004
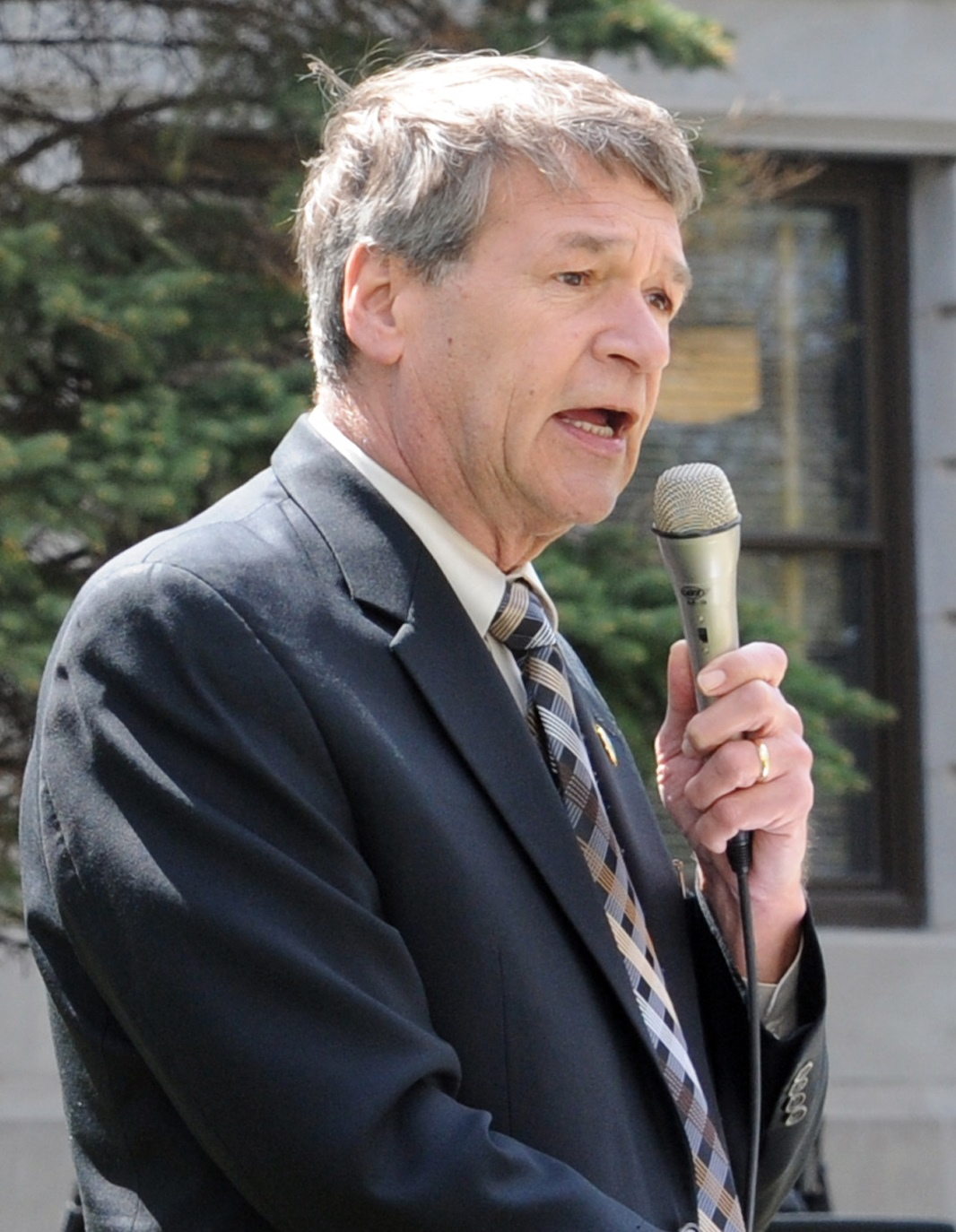

Nominee	Wayne Stenehjem	Bruce Schoenwald
Party	Republican	Democratic–NPL
Popular vote	218,627	82,768
Percentage	72.54%	27.46%
- County results Stenehjem: 50–60% 60–70% 70–80% 80–90% Schoenwald: 50–60% 60–70%
Attorney General before election
Wayne Stenehjem
Republican
Elected Attorney General
Wayne Stenehjem
Republican

The 2004 North Dakota Attorney General election was held on November 2, 2004, to elect the North Dakota Attorney General. Republican incumbent Wayne Stenehjem won re-election in a landslide, defeating Democratic–NPL nominee and attorney Bruce Schoenwald by forty-five percentage points and winning all but two counties.

== Republican primary ==
=== Candidates ===
- Wayne Stenehjem, incumbent North Dakota Attorney General (2000–2022)

=== Results ===
Republican primary results
Party	Candidate	Votes	%
Republican	Wayne Stenehjem	41,129	100.00%
Total votes		41,129	100.00%

== Democratic–NPL primary ==
=== Candidates ===
- Bruce Schoenwald, attorney

=== Results ===
Democratic–NPL primary results
Party	Candidate	Votes	%
Democratic–NPL	Bruce Schoenwald	33,672	100.00%
Total votes		33,672	100.00%

== General election ==
=== Candidates ===
- Wayne Stenehjem, incumbent North Dakota Attorney General (2000–2022) (Republican)
- Bruce Schoenwald, attorney (Democratic–NPL)

=== Results ===
2004 North Dakota Attorney General election results
Party	Candidate	Votes	%	±%
Republican	Wayne Stenehjem	218,627	72.54%	+16.80%
Democratic–NPL	Bruce Schoenwald	82,768	27.46%	−16.80%
Total votes		301,395	100.00%	
Republican hold				
