= Michael Polovitz =

American politician

Member of the North Dakota Senate from the 42nd district
- In office December 1, 2000 – December 1, 2004
- Preceded by: Wayne Stenehjem
- Succeeded by: Nicholas Hacker

Personal details
- Born: December 28, 1926 Wakefield, Michigan
- Died: December 14, 2013 (aged 86) Grand Forks, North Dakota
- Party: Democratic

Michael Polovitz (December 28, 1926 – December 14, 2013) was an American politician who served in the North Dakota Senate from the 42nd district from 2000 to 2004.

He died on December 14, 2013, in Grand Forks, North Dakota at age 86.
