= 2018 North Dakota Secretary of State election =

- November 6, 2018
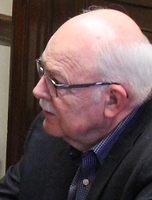

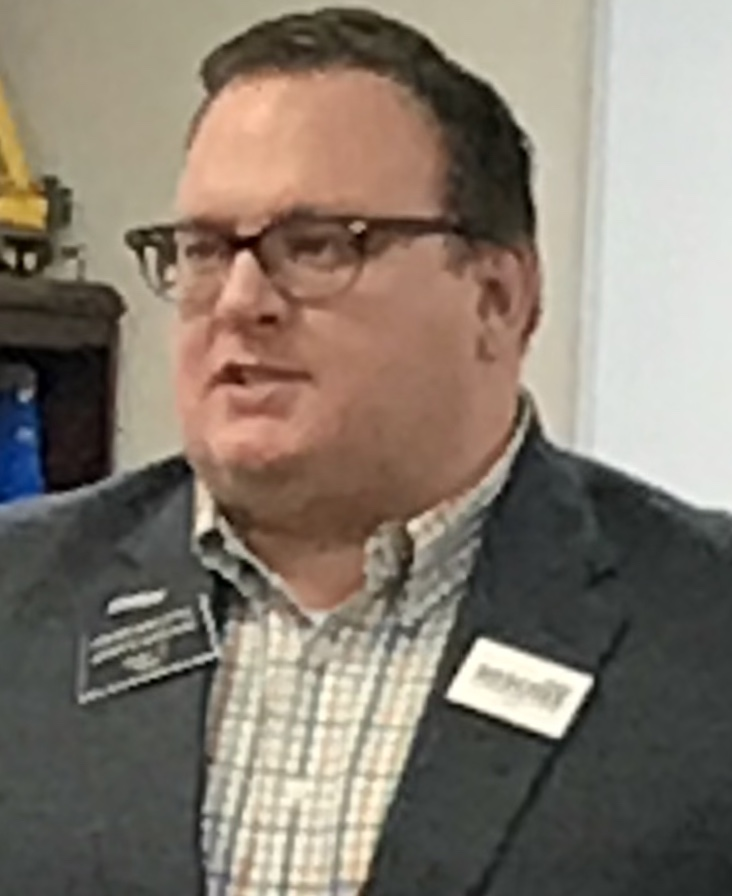

| Nominee | Alvin Jaeger | Joshua Boschee | Michael Coachman |
| Party | Independent | Democratic–NPL | Independent |
| Alliance | Republican |
| Popular vote | 145,275 | 120,475 | 40,590 |
| Percentage | 47.28% | 39.21% | 13.21% |
- Jaeger: 30–40% 40–50% 50–60% 60–70% 70–80% 80–90% >90% Boschee: 40–50% 50–60% 60–70% 70–80% 80–90% >90% Tie: 40–50%
Secretary of State before election
Alvin Jaeger
Republican
Elected Secretary of State
Alvin Jaeger
Independent

The 2018 North Dakota Secretary of State election occurred on November 6, 2018, to elect the North Dakota Secretary of State, concurrently with various other state and local elections. Six-time incumbent Republican Secretary of State Alvin Jaeger was eligible to run for re-election to a seventh term in office, but withdrew from his party's primary after failing to receive the endorsement. When the primary winner withdrew from the general election race, Jaeger and fellow Republican Michael Coachman each gathered and turned in signatures to run as independent candidates. Libertarian Party candidate Roland Riemers failed to get enough primary election votes to make the general election ballot both in an initial count and in a court-ordered recount. Democratic-NPL state representative Joshua Boschee was the only candidate who advanced from the primary and the only candidate that had his party listed on the general election ballot.

== Background ==
North Dakota Secretaries of State are elected to four-year terms, with no limit on the number of terms a candidate may serve. Prior to the election, incumbent Republican Alvin Jaeger had been elected to the office six times and planned to run for a seventh term.

== Republican primary ==
=== Candidates ===
==== Endorsed ====
- Will Gardner, businessman

==== Withdrawn ====
- Alvin Jaeger, incumbent Secretary of State

=== State convention ===
Delegates to the North Dakota Republican Party state convention held a vote to endorse a candidate for the race on April 7. Though any candidate may submit petitions to be placed on the party's primary ballot, the endorsement brings automatic ballot access. State convention delegates voted to endorse Gardner, and Jaeger withdrew from the race.

==== Results ====
Republican State Convention endorsement
| Party | Candidate | Votes | % |
|---|---|---|---|
| Republican | Will Gardner | 679 | 60.79 |
| Republican | Alvin Jaeger | 438 | 39.21 |
| Total votes | | 1,117 | 100.00 |

=== Primary election ===
==== Disorderly conduct incident ====
Between the convention and the primary election, North Dakota news outlets reported that Gardner had pleaded guilty to disorderly conduct for "peeping in numerous female dorm rooms" while working for NDSU in 2006. According to campus security guards on the scene that night, Gardner, who was 29 years old and employed as webmaster for NDSU's libraries at the time, was seen approaching multiple windows of a women's dorm building, attempting to look around window coverings, apparently to see the people inside. When stopped by security guards, the fly of Gardner's pants was unzipped. Gardner was charged with surreptitious intrusion, but accepted a deal from prosecutors where he instead pleaded guilty to a lesser charge of disorderly conduct. He received a sentence of 30 days in jail, but that sentence was suspended in its entirety.

In the aftermath of that incident becoming public, Gardner announced his intention to withdraw from the race for Secretary of State on May 20. Despite that intention, it was too late to withdraw his name from primary ballots or for any other candidate to add his or her name to the race. Write-in candidates had two days to officially declare their candidacy, but none did so publicly.

==== Results ====
Republican primary results
| Party | Candidate | Votes | % |
|---|---|---|---|
| Republican | Will Gardner | 54,563 | 93.37 |
| Write-in | | 3,875 | 6.63 |
| Total votes | | 58,438 | 100.00 |

==== Aftermath ====
Despite winning the primary election, Will Gardner officially declined the nomination by submitting a letter of withdrawal to the current Secretary of State, Al Jaeger. By doing so, he ensured that his name would be omitted from the general election ballot.

After Gardner officially withdrew, the North Dakota Republican Party state committee gave a letter of endorsement to incumbent Secretary of State Al Jaeger. This letter had no meaning in state law and did not allow Al Jaeger to appear as a Republican on the general election ballot.

== Democratic-NPL primary ==
=== Candidates ===
==== Endorsed ====
- Joshua Boschee, state representative

=== Results ===
Democratic-NPL primary results
| Party | Candidate | Votes | % |
|---|---|---|---|
| Democratic–NPL | Joshua Boschee | 33,039 | 99.79 |
| Write-in | | 69 | 0.21 |
| Total votes | | 33,108 | 100.00 |

== Libertarian primary ==
=== Candidates ===
==== Endorsed ====
- Roland Riemers, perennial candidate

=== Results ===
Libertarian primary results
| Party | Candidate | Votes | % |
|---|---|---|---|
| Libertarian | Roland Riemers | 247 | 92.51 |
| Write-in | | 20 | 7.49 |
| Total votes | | 267 | 100.00 |

=== Recount ===
In order to qualify for access to the general election ballot, a candidate requires 300 votes in the primary election. Libertarian candidate Roland Riemers failed to reach that threshold and so therefore was not slated to appear on the November ballot. Riemers petitioned the North Dakota Supreme Court to require a recount of all ballots; the court agreed and ordered the recount, but in the end, it only found one additional vote for Riemers.

== Independent candidates ==
In order to be placed on the general election ballot, independent candidates must turn in a list of signatures, at least 1,000 of which must be valid North Dakota electors, to the Secretary of State's office by September 14. Candidates who gain access to the ballot in this way appear alongside party-nominated candidates and will not have a party affiliation displayed alongside their name.

=== Michael Coachman ===
Former Republican candidate for Lieutenant Governor Michael Coachman turned in signatures on August 14. Since at least 1,000 of those were legal signatures from valid North Dakota electors, he appeared on the ballot.

=== Alvin Jaeger ===
Shortly after Republican candidate Will Gardner announced his withdrawal from the race, incumbent Republican Alvin Jaeger announced that he would re-enter the race as an independent politician. Jaeger had withdrawn from the race for the Republican party nomination to the office when he failed to pick up the party endorsement. With their candidate having withdrawn his candidacy, the North Dakota Republican State Committee endorsed Jaeger in a letter of support, an instrument that carries no weight of law, but which the party hoped would keep the office out of their rivals' control. On August 9, Jaeger turned in 1,300 signatures. As Secretary of State, Jaeger himself was responsible to certify the validity of those signatures, though Jaeger said he delegated that responsibility to others in his office. Enough signatures were found valid to allow Jaeger to appear on the General Election ballot.

== General election ==
=== Predictions ===
| Source | Ranking | As of |
|---|---|---|
| Governing | Safe R | October 11, 2018 |

=== Results ===
2018 North Dakota Secretary of State election
| Party | Candidate | Votes | % |
|---|---|---|---|
| Independent | Alvin Jaeger (incumbent) | 145,275 | 47.28 |
| Democratic–NPL | Joshua Boschee | 120,475 | 39.21 |
| Independent | Michael Coachman | 40,590 | 13.21 |
| Write-in | | 937 | 0.30 |
| Total votes | | 307,277 | 100.00 |
| Independent gain from Republican | | | |

== See also ==
- 2018 North Dakota elections
