= Nicholas Hacker =

American politician

Member of the North Dakota Senate from the 42nd district
- In office December 1, 2004 – December 1, 2008
- Preceded by: Michael Polovitz
- Succeeded by: Mac Schneider

Personal details
- Party: Republican

Nicholas Hacker is an American politician who served in the North Dakota Senate from the 42nd district from 2004 to 2008.
