= Roland Riemers =

American perennial candidate

Personal details
- Born: Roland Clifford Riemers; May 15, 1943 (age 83) Lake City, Minnesota, U.S.
- Party: Democratic (1996, 2020–present)
- Other political affiliations: Republican (1970s); Libertarian (1996–2020); Independent (at various times)
- Spouse: Meixiang Liu
- Children: 8
- Education: Anoka-Ramsey Community College (AS); University of North Dakota (BS)

Roland Clifford Riemers (born May 15, 1943) is an American perennial candidate. His frequent bids for office, first in Minnesota and later in North Dakota, have all been unsuccessful, apart from a victory in the 1996 North Dakota Democratic presidential primary.

== Early life and career ==
Riemers was born in 1943 in Lake City, Minnesota. He attended San Antonio College, received his AS in nursing from Anoka-Ramsey Community College in 1973, his BS in industrial technology from the University of North Dakota in 1984, and attended but did not graduate from the University of North Dakota School of Law in 1998 and 1999. Riemers currently lives in Grand Forks, North Dakota, and has 8 children.

Riemers was an early adopter of solar energy, and in the 1970s built and lived in the first completely solar-powered home in the northern United States. He currently works as a real estate investor and manager.

== Political career ==
Riemers made his first bid for office in 1970 for District 40 of the Minnesota House of Representatives. He ran as a Republican for Minnesota's 5th congressional district in 1972. He lost to Allen Davisson in the Republican primary, who went on to lose the general election to incumbent Democrat Donald M. Fraser. Riemers then ran for the United States Senate in the 1976 election and placed fourth in the Republican primary. In that election, he appeared on the ballot as Roland "Butch" Riemers.

During the 1996 Democratic Party presidential primaries, incumbent President Bill Clinton refused to file for the North Dakota primary because its early date violated national party rules. As a result, the only candidates on the ballot were Riemers, fellow North Dakotan Vernon Clemenson, and controversial political activist Lyndon LaRouche. Riemers prevailed, receiving 41% of the vote to LaRouche's 34% and Clemenson's 24% in a low-turnout race which saw fewer than 15% of voters participate.

Later in 1996, Riemers ran as a Libertarian for District 33 of the North Dakota House of Representatives. He placed last with 2.3% of the vote. Riemers lost independent bids for Governor of North Dakota in 2004 and 2012 and U.S. Senate in 2006. He also ran for Grand Forks County Sheriff in 2010, placing last in the nonpartisan primary with 1.5% of the vote. Riemers served as chair of the Libertarian Party of North Dakota from 2011 until 2015.

In 2014, Riemers ran for North Dakota Secretary of State as a Libertarian and placed third with 5.3% of the vote. In 2016, he was the Libertarian nominee for North Dakota State Auditor. Because no Democrat ran, Riemers faced Republican Josh Gallion in a head-to-head matchup, and while he lost the election by nearly 54 points, he won strongly Democratic Rolette and Sioux counties. In 2018, Riemers again ran for Secretary of State, but was unable to make it onto the ballot and launched a write-in campaign for North Dakota Agriculture Commissioner instead.

Riemers ran for the U.S. House of Representatives in 2020 as a Democrat. He opposed Donald Trump's presidency and branded himself as a "dump-the-Trump" candidate. However, the North Dakota Democratic–Nonpartisan League Party disavowed his candidacy, citing his right-wing economic policies and opposition to COVID-19 pandemic containment measures. He lost the primary to Zach Raknerud, receiving 37% of the vote.

In 2024, Riemers ran in the Democratic–Nonpartisan League primary for North Dakota's lone House seat. He simultaneously filed to run for a seat on the Grand Forks School Board. Riemers lost both races, earning 26.26% in the Congressional primary, coming in second behind Trygve Hammer who received 73.34% of the vote and finished last with just 4.9% in the School Board race.

== Political positions ==
Riemers supports marijuana legalization and identifies as pro-choice. He opposes increased gun control and supports repealing the Patriot Act.

On economic issues, Riemers favors lower taxation and a reduced state budget. He supports school vouchers and calls himself "conservative when it comes to spending". Riemers favors repealing the Patient Protection and Affordable Care Act.

Riemers opposed the CARES Act, the $2.2 trillion economic stimulus bill designed to combat the economic conditions brought on by the COVID-19 pandemic. Instead of business closures, he favored social distancing measures and herd immunity to fight the pandemic.

== Legal issues ==
In 2012, Riemers' address was placed on the sex offender registry, after he let a convicted sex offender move in with him.

In May 2017, Riemers was charged with domestic assault after allegedly striking his wife, Meixiang Liu. The charges were dismissed that September, citing insufficient evidence.

In October 2022, Riemers was charged with a Class B misdemeanor disorderly conduct after a one-day trial. Riemers had parked his car near the train tracks at the intersection of 55th Street N. and DeMers Ave. in Grand Forks, ND and attempted to put a BNSF Railway train and all of its staff under citizen's arrest for blocking the road for more than 10 minutes. During the trial he stated “I am an activist against train blockages in Grand Forks, I consider this a serious problem.” It took 20 minutes for the jury to reach a guilty verdict and he was sentenced to 360 days of unsupervised probation and a $500 fine.
