= Mary Ekstrom =

American politician (born 1951)

Member of the North Dakota House of Representatives from the 11th district
- In office 1999–2011

Personal details
- Born: November 11, 1951 (age 74) Baltimore, Maryland
- Party: North Dakota Democratic-NPL Party
- Spouse: widowed
- Profession: business owner

Mary O. Ekstrom (born November 11, 1951) is a North Dakota Democratic-NPL Party member of the North Dakota House of Representatives, representing the 11th district from 1999 to 2011.

Party political offices
Preceded by Shirley Dykshoorn	Democratic nominee for North Dakota State Auditor; 2000	Succeeded by Brent Edison
