= Jonathan Sickler =

American politician

Member of the North Dakota Senate from the 17th district
- Incumbent
- Assumed office June 2, 2022
- Preceded by: Ray Holmberg

Personal details
- Born: Dickinson, North Dakota, U.S.
- Party: Republican
- Children: 3
- Education: University of North Dakota; Harvard Law School

Jonathan Sickler is an American politician. He serves as a Republican member for the 17th district of the North Dakota Senate.

Sickler was born in Dickinson, North Dakota and raised on a farm. He attended the University of North Dakota, where he earned an undergraduate degree, and Harvard Law School, where he earned a Juris Doctor degree. He practised law in Washington, D.C., returning to North Dakota to work as a chief legal officer in Grand Forks, North Dakota.

In 2022 Sickler was appointed to represent District 17 in the North Dakota Senate, succeeding longtime senator Ray Holmberg. Sickler assumed his office on June 2, 2022, and was subsequently elected to a full term in November 2022.
