= Ryan Rauschenberger =

American politician

24th Tax Commissioner of North Dakota
- In office November 8, 2013 – January 3, 2022; On leave: September 5, 2014 – October 9, 2014*
- Governor: Jack Dalrymple; Doug Burgum
- Preceded by: Cory Fong
- Succeeded by: Brian Kroshus

Personal details
- Born: 1982 or 1983 (age 41–42)
- Political party: Republican
- Education: University of North Dakota (BS, MBA)
- *Joe Morrissette served in an acting capacity while Rauschenberger was on leave.

Ryan Rauschenberger is the former Tax Commissioner of North Dakota, the 24th person to serve in that role. Governor Jack Dalrymple appointed Rauschenberger, the son of Dalrymple's Chief of Staff Ron Rauschenberger, to the role in 2013 after the resignation of Cory Fong. Rauschenberger announced he would resign effective January 3, 2022.

== Alcoholism treatment ==
While drinking on the afternoon of September 3, 2014, Rauschenberger lent his vehicle to his friend Jesse Larson, who was also intoxicated. While driving Rauschenberger's vehicle, Larson rolled the vehicle, damaging its front end. Police cited Larson for driving under the influence and reckless driving and had him taken to an emergency room for minor injuries. After the accident, Rauschenberger explained that he had been undergoing treatment for an alcohol addiction and that he met Larson while the two were undergoing inpatient treatment at a local drug and alcohol treatment center.

Two days after the accident, Rauschenberger announced he was taking a leave of absence from his duties as Tax Commissioner and his reelection campaign to dedicate himself to his alcoholism treatment. His official duties were given to Deputy Tax Commissioner Joe Morrissette, and his reelection campaign continued without the candidate until his return. Rauschenberger was reelected that November.

On September 30, 2017, a little more than three years after the previous incident, Rauschenberger was arrested and charged with driving under the influence of intoxicating liquors. According to police, Rauschenberger's blood alcohol content was .206, more than two and a half times North Dakota's legal limit.

Around 11:30 a.m on November 15, 2021, police once again brought Rauschenberger to jail, this time for detoxification, rather than a crime. Rauschenberger had tried to check into a Bismarck hotel room late that morning, but when told it was not ready, shut himself into a different room that was being cleaned. Police determined he was "intoxicated beyond the point of being able to take care of himself" and since Rauschenberger was unable or unwilling to contact someone sober to take him, he was taken to jail. No charges were filed, and he was released later that day. The following day, Rauschenberger announced his resignation from office.

== Electoral history ==
North Dakota Tax Commissioner Election, 2014
Party	Candidate	Votes	%
Republican	Ryan Rauschenberger (inc.)	135,329	56.76
Democratic–NPL	Jason Astrup	87,516	36.71
Libertarian	Anthony Mangnall	15,328	6.39
Write-in		344	0.14
Total votes		238,517	100.00

North Dakota Tax Commissioner Election, 2018
Party	Candidate	Votes	%
Republican	Ryan Rauschenberger (inc.)	183,283	58.6
Democratic–NPL	Kylie Oversen	128,806	41.2
Write-in		684	0.2
Total votes		312,773	100.0

Party political offices
Preceded by Cory Fong	Republican nominee for Tax Commissioner of North Dakota; 2014, 2018	Succeeded by Brian Kroshus
Political offices
Preceded by Cory Fong	Tax Commissioner of North Dakota; 2013–2022	Succeeded by Brian Kroshus
