= 2020 United States House of Representatives election in North Dakota =

2020 United States House of Representatives election in North Dakota's at-large district
- November 3, 2020
- Turnout: 61.16% ▲
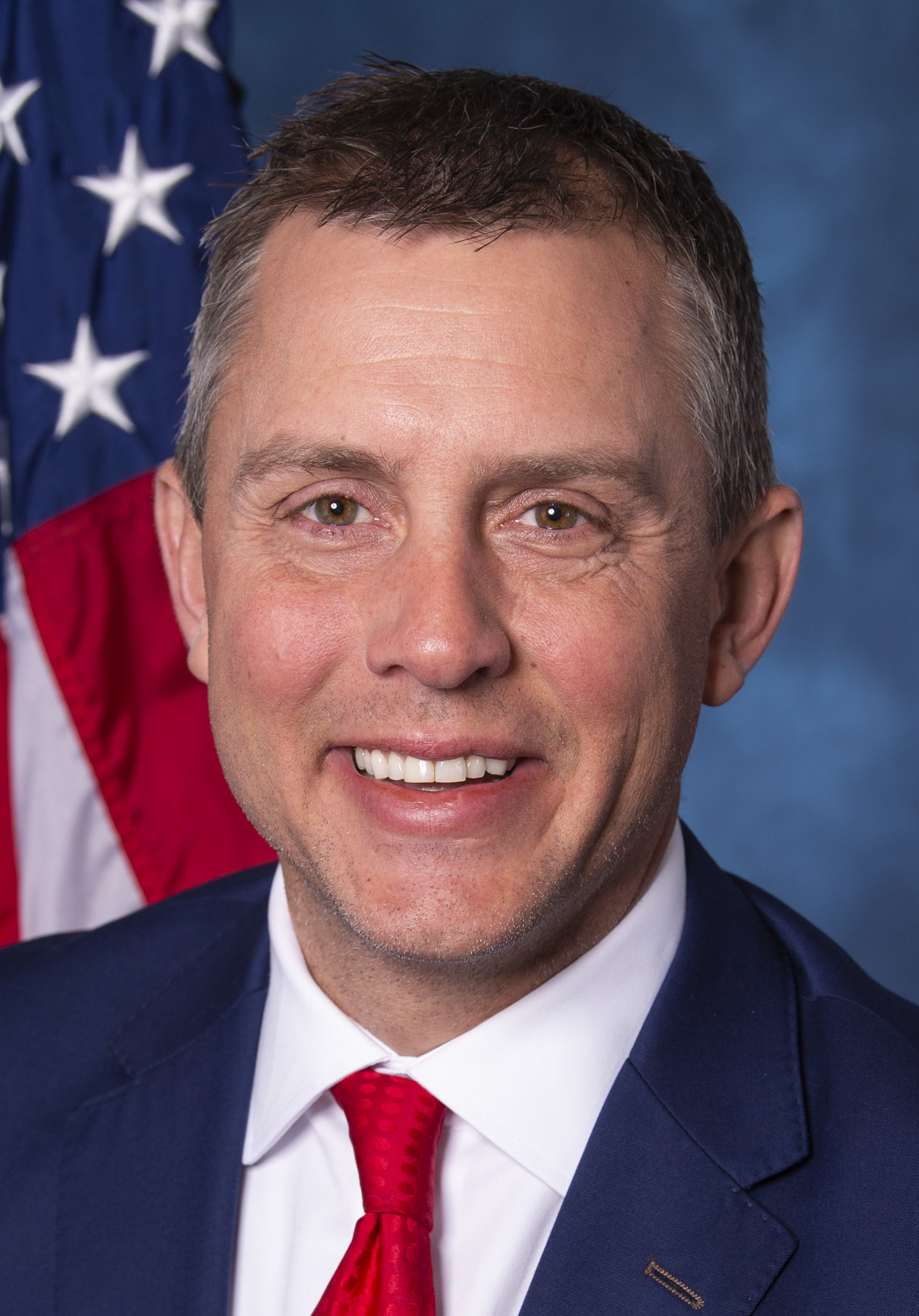

Nominee	Kelly Armstrong	Zach Raknerud
Party	Republican	Democratic–NPL
Popular vote	245,229	97,970
Percentage	68.96%	27.55%
- Armstrong: 40–50% 50–60% 60–70% 70–80% 80–90% >90% Raknerud: 40–50% 50–60% 60–70% 70–80% 80–90%
U.S. Representative before election
Kelly Armstrong
Republican
Elected U.S. Representative
Kelly Armstrong
Republican

The 2020 United States House of Representatives election in North Dakota was held on November 3, 2020, to elect the U.S. representative from North Dakota's at-large congressional district. The election coincided with the 2020 U.S. presidential election, as well as other elections to the House of Representatives, elections to the United States Senate, and various state and local elections.

The incumbent was Republican Kelly Armstrong, who was elected with 60.2% of the vote in 2018. He was re-elected in 2020 and won 5 counties he lost in 2018.

== Republican primary ==
=== Candidates ===
==== Declared ====
- Kelly Armstrong, incumbent U.S. representative

=== Primary results ===
Republican primary results
Party	Candidate	Votes	%
Republican	Kelly Armstrong (incumbent)	99,582	99.54%
Republican	Write-in	461	0.46%
Total votes		100,043	100.0%

== Democratic-NPL primary ==
=== Candidates ===
==== Declared ====
- Zach Raknerud, retail manager and Democratic-NPL nominee for District 5 of the North Dakota House of Representatives in 2018
- Roland Riemers, perennial candidate, winner of the 1996 North Dakota Democratic primary

=== Endorsements ===
Zach Raknerud

Labor unions

- North Dakota AFL–CIO

Organizations

- DUH! Demand Universal Healthcare
- North Dakota Democratic-Nonpartisan League Party

=== Primary results ===
Democratic primary results by county: Zachary Raknerud: 80–85% 65–70% 60–65% 55–60% 50–55% 35–40%; Roland Riemers: 75–80% 60–65% 55–60% 50–55% 40–45%

Democratic primary results
Party	Candidate	Votes	%
Democratic–NPL	Zach Raknerud	21,394	62.03%
Democratic–NPL	Roland Riemers	12,747	36.96%
Democratic–NPL	Write-in	346	1.00%
Total votes		34,487	100.0%

== Libertarian primary ==
=== Candidates ===
==== Declared ====
- Steven Peterson

==== Primary results ====
Libertarian primary results
Party	Candidate	Votes	%
Libertarian	Steven Peterson	729	78.47%
Libertarian	Write-in	200	22.36%
Total votes		929	100.0%

== General election ==
=== Predictions ===
Source	Ranking	As of
The Cook Political Report	Safe R	November 2, 2020
Inside Elections	Safe R	October 28, 2020
Sabato's Crystal Ball	Safe R	November 2, 2020
Politico	Safe R	November 2, 2020
Daily Kos	Safe R	November 2, 2020
RCP	Safe R	November 2, 2020

=== Results ===
North Dakota's at-large congressional district, 2020
Party	Candidate	Votes	%	±%
Republican	Kelly Armstrong (incumbent)	245,229	68.96%	+8.76%
Democratic–NPL	Zach Raknerud	97,970	27.55%	−8.02%
Libertarian	Steven Peterson	12,024	3.38%	N/A
n/a	Write-ins	375	0.11%	N/A
Total votes		355,598	100.00%	
Republican hold				

==== By county ====
County	Kelly Armstrong Republican		Zach Raknerud Democratic–NPL		All others		Margin		Total votes
County	#	%	#	%	#	%	#	%	Total votes
Adams	1,010	80.4%	213	17.0%	33	2.6%	797	63.4%	1,256
Barnes	3,737	68.3%	1,562	28.6%	172	3.2%	2,175	39.7%	5,471
Benson	1,138	58.8%	738	38.2%	58	3.0%	400	20.6%	1,934
Billings	554	87.4%	64	10.1%	16	2.5%	490	77.3%	634
Bottineau	2,646	77.3%	692	20.2%	84	2.5%	1,954	57.1%	3,422
Bowman	1,413	85.9%	195	11.9%	37	2.3%	1,218	74.0%	1,645
Burke	977	86.2%	140	12.3%	17	1.5%	837	73.9%	1,134
Burleigh	36,122	72.4%	12,111	24.3%	1,643	3.3%	24,011	48.1%	49,876
Cass	46,877	55.5%	34,055	40.3%	3,603	4.3%	12,822	15.2%	84,535
Cavalier	1,548	77.7%	400	20.1%	44	2.3%	1,148	57.6%	1,992
Dickey	1,796	74.7%	532	22.1%	77	3.3%	1,264	52.6%	2,405
Divide	913	76.6%	242	20.3%	37	3.1%	671	56.3%	1,192
Dunn	1,948	83.6%	319	13.7%	62	2.7%	1,629	69.9%	2,329
Eddy	874	70.1%	336	27.0%	36	2.9%	538	43.1%	1,246
Emmons	1,736	87.7%	207	10.5%	37	1.9%	1,529	77.2%	1,980
Foster	1,391	79.6%	318	18.2%	38	2.2%	1,073	61.4%	1,747
Golden Valley	871	86.5%	114	11.3%	22	2.2%	757	75.2%	1,007
Grand Forks	18,427	61.0%	10,746	35.6%	1,038	3.5%	7,681	25.4%	30,211
Grant	1,163	84.3%	189	13.7%	27	2.0%	974	70.6%	1,379
Griggs	941	76.7%	260	21.2%	26	2.1%	681	55.5%	1,227
Hettinger	1,126	86.5%	149	11.5%	26	2.0%	977	75.0%	1,301
Kidder	1,217	83.6%	212	14.6%	27	1.9%	1,005	69.0%	1,456
LaMoure	1,695	77.2%	437	19.9%	63	2.8%	1,258	57.3%	2,195
Logan	914	86.6%	113	10.7%	28	2.7%	801	75.9%	1,055
McHenry	2,358	79.1%	554	18.6%	69	2.4%	1,804	60.5%	2,981
McIntosh	1,191	82.4%	220	15.2%	34	2.4%	971	67.2%	1,445
McKenzie	4,395	82.7%	719	13.5%	201	3.8%	3,676	69.2%	5,315
McLean	4,220	77.1%	1,119	20.4%	137	2.5%	3,101	66.7%	5,476
Mercer	3,871	83.5%	668	14.4%	98	2.1%	3,203	69.1%	4,637
Morton	12,382	75.8%	3,375	20.6%	587	3.6%	9,007	55.2%	16,344
Mountrail	2,819	68.8%	1,154	28.2%	125	3.1%	1,665	40.6%	4,098
Nelson	1,195	68.6%	495	28.4%	53	3.1%	1,665	40.2%	4,098
Oliver	906	85.9%	121	11.5%	28	2.7%	785	74.4%	1,055
Pembina	2,518	76.7%	685	20.9%	81	2.4%	1,833	55.8%	3,284
Pierce	1,633	78.0%	411	19.6%	49	2.3%	1,222	57.6%	2,093
Ramsey	3,786	71.1%	1,362	25.6%	175	3.3%	2,424	45.5%	5,323
Ransom	1,492	61.8%	818	33.9%	105	4.3%	674	27.9%	2,415
Renville	1,073	81.8%	194	14.8%	44	3.4%	879	67.0%	1,311
Richland	5,276	68.7%	2,124	27.7%	276	3.6%	3,152	41.0%	7,676
Rolette	1,344	36.0%	2,292	61.3%	102	2.8%	-948	-25.3%	3,738
Sargent	1,295	63.9%	674	33.2%	59	2.9%	621	30.7%	2,028
Sheridan	684	85.1%	103	12.8%	17	2.1%	581	72.3%	804
Sioux	294	25.1%	728	62.1%	150	12.8%	-434	-37.1%	1,172
Slope	377	89.5%	37	8.8%	7	1.7%	340	80.7%	421
Stark	12,408	83.5%	1,981	13.3%	463	3.1%	10,427	70.2%	14,852
Steele	704	65.6%	344	32.1%	25	2.3%	360	33.5%	1,073
Stutsman	7,005	73.0%	2,252	23.5%	342	3.6%	4,753	49.5%	9,599
Towner	866	75.0%	271	23.5%	18	1.6%	595	51.5%	1,155
Traill	2,709	66.1%	1,275	31.1%	115	2.8%	1,434	35.0%	4,099
Walsh	3,485	74.3%	1,082	23.1%	122	2.6%	2,403	51.2%	4,689
Ward	20,465	73.4%	6,320	22.7%	1,100	3.9%	14,145	50.7%	27,885
Wells	1,910	81.2%	386	16.4%	55	2.3%	1,524	64.8%	2,351
Williams	11,534	82.9%	1,862	13.4%	511	3.6%	9,672	69.5%	13,907
Totals	245,229	69.0%	97,970	27.6%	12,399	3.5%	147,259	41.4%	355,598

Counties that flipped from Democratic to Republican

- Cass (largest city: Fargo)
- Grand Forks (largest city: Grand Forks)
- Benson (largest CDP: Fort Totten)
- Ransom (largest city: Lisbon)
- Steele (largest city: Finley)
