= 1996 United States presidential election in North Dakota =

- November 5, 1996

Nominee	Bob Dole	Bill Clinton	Ross Perot
Party	Republican	Democratic–NPL	Reform
Home state	Kansas	Arkansas	Texas
Running mate	Jack Kemp	Al Gore	Pat Choate
Electoral vote	3	0	0
Popular vote	125,050	106,905	32,515
Percentage	46.94%	40.13%	12.20%
County results
Dole
40–50%
50–60%
60–70%
Clinton
40–50%
50–60%
60–70%
President before election
Bill Clinton
Democratic-NPL
Elected President
Bill Clinton
Democratic-NPL

The 1996 United States presidential election in North Dakota took place on November 5, 1996. All 50 states and the District of Columbia, were part of the 1996 United States presidential election. State voters chose three electors to the Electoral College, which selected the president and vice president.

North Dakota was won by Kansas Senator Bob Dole, who was running against incumbent United States President Bill Clinton of Arkansas. Clinton ran a second time with former Tennessee Senator Al Gore as Vice President, and Dole ran with former New York Congressman Jack Kemp.

North Dakota weighed in for this election as 5% more third-party than the national average. The presidential election of 1996 was a very multi-partisan election for North Dakota, with almost 13% of the electorate voting for third-party candidates. All major counties in North Dakota turned out for Dole, including the (relatively) highly populated center of Cass County, which contains the city of Fargo.

In his second bid for the presidency, Ross Perot led the newly reformed Reform Party to gain over 12% of the votes in North Dakota, and to pull in support nationally as the most popular third-party candidate to run for the U.S. presidency in recent times. His performance in the state was his fifth-strongest in the election after Maine, Montana, Idaho and Wyoming.

As of the 2024 presidential election, this is the last election in which Divide County and Ramsey County voted for the Democratic candidate.

== Primary elections ==
=== Democratic primary ===
1996 North Dakota Democratic presidential primary
- February 27, 1996

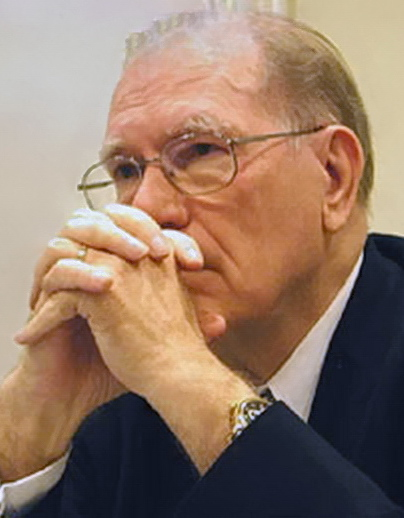

Candidate	Roland Riemers	Lyndon LaRouche	Vernon Clemenson
Home state	North Dakota	Virginia	North Dakota
Popular vote	656	547	383
Percentage	41.36%	34.49%	24.15%
- County results Riemers: LaRouche: Clemenson: Tied

The North Dakota Democratic presidential primary was held on February 27, 1996, in North Dakota as one of the Democratic Party's statewide nomination contests ahead of the 1996 presidential election. Incumbent President Bill Clinton did not appear on the ballot allowing for a minor candidate, Roland Riemers, to win the primary.

Clinton refused to contest the election due to the North Dakota Democratic-Nonpartisan League violating national party rules by holding its presidential primary too early and allowing non-Democrats to vote in that Primary.

1996 North Dakota Democratic presidential primary
Candidate	Votes	%
Roland Riemers	656	41.36%
Lyndon LaRouche	547	34.49%
Vernon Clemenson	383	24.15%
Total	1,586	100.00%

== Results ==
1996 United States presidential election in North Dakota
Party	Candidate	Votes	Percentage	Electoral votes
Republican	Bob Dole	125,050	46.94%	3
Democratic-NPL	Bill Clinton (incumbent)	106,905	40.13%	0
Reform	Ross Perot	32,515	12.20%	0
Libertarian	Harry Browne	847	0.32%	0
Taxpayers’	Howard Phillips	745	0.28%	0
Natural Law	Dr. John Hagelin	349	0.13%	0
Totals		266,411	100.00%	3
Voter Turnout (Voting age/Registered)				

=== Results by county ===
County	Bob Dole Republican		Bill Clinton Democratic-NPL		Ross Perot Reform		Harry Browne Libertarian		Howard Phillips U.S. Taxpayers		John Hagelin Natural Law		Margin		Total votes cast
County	#	%	#	%	#	%	#	%	#	%	#	%	#	%	Total votes cast
Adams	575	49.91%	366	31.77%	200	17.36%	5	0.43%	6	0.52%	0	0.00%	209	18.14%	1,152
Barnes	2,449	44.79%	2,317	42.37%	666	12.18%	13	0.24%	15	0.27%	8	0.15%	132	2.42%	5,468
Benson	850	39.13%	1,059	48.76%	252	11.60%	5	0.23%	5	0.23%	1	0.05%	-209	-9.63%	2,172
Billings	281	55.42%	116	22.88%	107	21.10%	3	0.59%	0	0.00%	0	0.00%	165	32.54%	507
Bottineau	1,682	47.80%	1,280	36.37%	536	15.23%	15	0.43%	3	0.09%	3	0.09%	402	11.43%	3,519
Bowman	710	48.20%	489	33.20%	261	17.72%	3	0.20%	8	0.54%	2	0.14%	221	15.00%	1,473
Burke	483	44.35%	416	38.20%	176	16.16%	3	0.28%	11	1.01%	0	0.00%	67	6.15%	1,089
Burleigh	15,464	51.74%	10,679	35.73%	3,535	11.83%	102	0.34%	77	0.26%	33	0.11%	4,785	16.01%	29,890
Cass	24,238	48.02%	21,693	42.98%	4,116	8.16%	217	0.43%	139	0.28%	68	0.13%	2,545	5.04%	50,471
Cavalier	1,188	47.85%	941	37.90%	326	13.13%	13	0.52%	13	0.52%	2	0.08%	247	9.95%	2,483
Dickey	1,418	53.21%	953	35.76%	276	10.36%	6	0.23%	9	0.34%	3	0.11%	465	17.45%	2,665
Divide	488	36.42%	637	47.54%	209	15.60%	1	0.07%	4	0.30%	1	0.07%	-149	-11.12%	1,340
Dunn	830	47.62%	587	33.68%	304	17.44%	4	0.23%	17	0.98%	1	0.06%	243	13.94%	1,743
Eddy	517	40.36%	553	43.17%	201	15.69%	2	0.16%	7	0.55%	1	0.08%	-36	-2.81%	1,281
Emmons	1,148	53.54%	544	25.37%	441	20.57%	2	0.09%	6	0.28%	3	0.14%	604	28.17%	2,144
Foster	801	45.93%	664	38.07%	265	15.19%	5	0.29%	6	0.34%	3	0.17%	137	7.86%	1,744
Golden Valley	520	56.28%	235	25.43%	163	17.64%	1	0.11%	3	0.32%	2	0.22%	285	30.85%	924
Grand Forks	11,606	44.92%	11,376	44.03%	2,663	10.31%	130	0.50%	31	0.12%	30	0.12%	230	0.89%	25,836
Grant	760	55.51%	300	21.91%	295	21.55%	4	0.29%	8	0.58%	2	0.15%	460	33.60%	1,369
Griggs	731	46.53%	670	42.65%	162	10.31%	6	0.38%	2	0.13%	0	0.00%	61	3.88%	1,571
Hettinger	765	53.65%	418	29.31%	238	16.69%	2	0.14%	1	0.07%	2	0.14%	347	24.34%	1,426
Kidder	691	50.00%	434	31.40%	242	17.51%	4	0.29%	9	0.65%	2	0.14%	257	18.60%	1,382
LaMoure	1,220	51.15%	880	36.90%	276	11.57%	5	0.21%	3	0.13%	1	0.04%	340	14.25%	2,385
Logan	705	53.09%	360	27.11%	254	19.13%	4	0.30%	4	0.30%	1	0.08%	345	25.98%	1,328
McHenry	1,187	43.07%	1,096	39.77%	453	16.44%	7	0.25%	10	0.36%	3	0.11%	91	3.30%	2,756
McIntosh	1,005	56.43%	470	26.39%	295	16.56%	3	0.17%	5	0.28%	3	0.17%	535	30.04%	1,781
McKenzie	1,338	49.50%	928	34.33%	428	15.83%	3	0.11%	4	0.15%	2	0.07%	410	15.17%	2,703
McLean	1,988	45.39%	1,759	40.16%	618	14.11%	5	0.11%	6	0.14%	4	0.09%	229	5.23%	4,380
Mercer	1,953	48.32%	1,300	32.16%	764	18.90%	9	0.22%	11	0.27%	5	0.12%	653	16.16%	4,042
Morton	4,699	46.66%	3,745	37.19%	1,566	15.55%	19	0.19%	25	0.25%	16	0.16%	954	9.47%	10,070
Mountrail	965	36.90%	1,277	48.83%	360	13.77%	3	0.11%	9	0.34%	1	0.04%	-312	-11.93%	2,615
Nelson	745	41.41%	827	45.97%	206	11.45%	9	0.50%	8	0.44%	4	0.22%	-82	-4.56%	1,799
Oliver	499	48.83%	333	32.58%	183	17.91%	1	0.10%	6	0.59%	0	0.00%	166	16.25%	1,022
Pembina	1,678	50.94%	1,191	36.16%	400	12.14%	16	0.49%	6	0.18%	3	0.09%	487	14.78%	3,294
Pierce	1,017	51.52%	671	33.99%	270	13.68%	5	0.25%	10	0.51%	1	0.05%	346	17.53%	1,974
Ramsey	2,077	43.51%	2,123	44.47%	549	11.50%	8	0.17%	11	0.23%	6	0.13%	-46	-0.96%	4,774
Ransom	920	37.78%	1,199	49.24%	303	12.44%	6	0.25%	4	0.16%	3	0.12%	-279	-11.46%	2,435
Renville	576	42.54%	562	41.51%	210	15.51%	2	0.15%	3	0.22%	1	0.07%	14	1.03%	1,354
Richland	3,345	47.32%	2,890	40.88%	782	11.06%	22	0.31%	15	0.21%	15	0.21%	455	6.44%	7,069
Rolette	823	22.85%	2,299	63.84%	448	12.44%	8	0.22%	14	0.39%	9	0.25%	-1,476	-40.99%	3,601
Sargent	814	39.38%	1,003	48.52%	241	11.66%	5	0.24%	2	0.10%	2	0.10%	-189	-9.14%	2,067
Sheridan	566	60.15%	252	26.78%	121	12.86%	1	0.11%	1	0.11%	0	0.00%	314	33.37%	941
Sioux	207	30.00%	393	56.96%	82	11.88%	4	0.58%	2	0.29%	2	0.29%	-186	-26.96%	690
Slope	260	58.43%	123	27.64%	60	13.48%	1	0.22%	1	0.22%	0	0.00%	137	30.79%	445
Stark	4,086	46.94%	3,095	35.55%	1,456	16.73%	25	0.29%	31	0.36%	12	0.14%	991	11.39%	8,705
Steele	486	39.67%	620	50.61%	115	9.39%	2	0.16%	1	0.08%	1	0.08%	-134	-10.94%	1,225
Stutsman	3,784	44.04%	3,589	41.77%	1,141	13.28%	28	0.33%	28	0.33%	23	0.27%	195	2.27%	8,593
Towner	542	39.08%	649	46.79%	187	13.48%	4	0.29%	2	0.14%	3	0.22%	-107	-7.71%	1,387
Traill	1,820	45.03%	1,822	45.08%	380	9.40%	13	0.32%	4	0.10%	3	0.07%	-2	-0.05%	4,042
Walsh	2,222	44.99%	2,082	42.15%	599	12.13%	10	0.20%	24	0.49%	2	0.04%	140	2.84%	4,939
Ward	10,546	48.01%	8,660	39.43%	2,587	11.78%	54	0.25%	74	0.34%	43	0.20%	1,886	8.58%	21,964
Wells	1,192	46.89%	962	37.84%	373	14.67%	1	0.04%	11	0.43%	3	0.12%	230	9.05%	2,542
Williams	3,590	45.79%	3,018	38.49%	1,174	14.97%	21	0.27%	27	0.34%	10	0.13%	572	7.30%	7,840
Totals	125,050	46.94%	106,905	40.13%	32,515	12.20%	847	0.32%	745	0.28%	349	0.13%	18,145	6.81%	266,411

==== Counties that flipped from Republican to Democratic ====
- Eddy
- Nelson
- Ramsey
- Traill

== See also ==
- United States presidential elections in North Dakota
- Presidency of Bill Clinton
