= Brent Edison =

American attorney and politician

Brent Edison (born 1956, Milnor, North Dakota) is an attorney and Democratic-NPL politician from North Dakota.

== Early life ==
He graduated from North Dakota State University with a business degree and attended law school at the University of North Dakota. Edison is a native of Milnor.

== Career ==
He has unsuccessfully run for both State Auditor in 2004 and for State Tax Commissioner in 2006. Edison's campaign for Tax Commissioner was tarnished when it was publicized that he was fired from a state agency, Workforce Safety and Insurance, after reportedly creating a hostile work environment. Nonetheless, there was never a formal reason for Edison's dismissal, leading many to believe it was politically motivated. Indeed, Edison proved not to be the problem at WSI and unrest worsened dramatically after Edison's firing.

Currently, he lives in Bismarck and works as Disciplinary Counsel for the Disciplinary Board of the North Dakota Supreme Court and the state Judicial Conduct Commission.

== Notes ==
Party political offices
Preceded by Mary Ekstrom	Democratic nominee for North Dakota State Auditor; 2004	Succeeded by Daryl Splichal
Preceded by Mike Every	Democratic nominee for Tax Commissioner of North Dakota; 2006	Succeeded by Cynthia Kaldor
