= Bob Stenehjem =

American politician

Member of the North Dakota Senate from the 30th district
- In office 1993–2011

Majority Leader of the North Dakota Senate
- In office 2001–2011

Personal details
- Born: January 12, 1952 North Dakota
- Died: July 18, 2011 (aged 59) near Soldotna, Alaska
- Party: Republican
- Spouse: Kathy Stenehjem
- Children: 4
- Relatives: Wayne Stenehjem (brother)
- Education: Bismarck State College
- Occupation: Roads and Streets Foreman

Robert "Bob" Stenehjem (/ˈstɛndʒəm/ STEN-jəm; January 12, 1952 – July 18, 2011) was a North Dakota Republican politician, serving in the North Dakota Senate for District 30. He was the Senate Majority Leader from 2001 until his death in 2011. Stenehjem ran for the Republican nomination for a seat on the North Dakota Public Service Commission in 2008 to succeed the retiring Commissioner, Susan Wefald. Stenehjem lost the nomination during the North Dakota Republican Party's state convention on March 29, 2008, coming in second place to eventual nominee Brian Kalk, a professor at North Dakota State University, during the North Dakota Republican Party state convention March 29, 2008. Stenehjem was subsequently re-elected to his seat in the state senate in 2008. Stenehjem was a graduate of Bismarck High School and Bismarck State College. He was a member of Ducks Unlimited and the National Rifle Association of America. He was the brother of North Dakota Attorney General Wayne Stenehjem.

On July 18, 2011, Stenehjem was killed in a single vehicle auto accident near Soldotna, Alaska, where his brother, John and son, Rob live.
