= Cory Fong =

North Dakota public servant

23rd North Dakota Tax Commissioner
- In office 2005–2013
- Governor: John Hoeven; Jack Dalrymple
- Preceded by: Rick Clayburgh
- Succeeded by: Ryan Rauschenberger

Personal details
- Born: August 6, 1972 (age 54)
- Party: Republican

Cory Fong (born August 6, 1972, Great Falls, Montana) is a North Dakota public servant. He is a Republican, and the former state State Tax Commissioner.

Fong was appointed Tax Commissioner in 2005 by Governor John Hoeven following the resignation of Rick Clayburgh (who left the job to become executive director of the North Dakota Bankers Association). He was elected to the position in 2006, when he faced Brent Edison, 53% to 47%, after a heated campaign.

== Biography ==
He was born in Great Falls to Donna Lee and Terry Fong and was raised in Helena, Montana. He moved to Bismarck, North Dakota in 1994 to fill the post of Deputy Secretary of State. He is a graduate of Gonzaga University in Spokane.

Fong began his career in public service at the North Dakota Secretary of State's office, first as a staffer, then as state elections director, and finally, Deputy Secretary of State. Fong's responsibilities included addressing the Help America Vote Act (HAVA). In 2004, Fong was a leader of the John Hoeven re-election campaign. He is married to Cecily Fong, and has one stepson, Conrad Eggers.

He resigned as Tax Commissioner effective December 31, 2013, to join the public affairs division of Odney Advertising. On February 1, 2016, Fong became the communications director for MDU Resources Group Inc.

Party political offices
Preceded by Rick Clayburgh	Republican nominee for Tax Commissioner of North Dakota; 2006, 2010	Succeeded by Ryan Rauschenberger
Political offices
Preceded by Rick Clayburgh	Tax Commissioner of North Dakota; 2005–2013	Succeeded by Ryan Rauschenberger
