= 2018 North Dakota elections =

- November 6, 2018

North Dakota held two statewide elections in 2018: a primary election on Tuesday, June 12, and a general election on Tuesday, November 6. In addition, each township elected officers on Tuesday, March 20, and each school district held their elections on a date of its choosing between April 1 and June 30.

== Primary election ==
On Tuesday, June 12, North Dakota voters selected which candidates for statewide and legislative office would appear on the November ballot. Because North Dakota does not have party registration, any eligible voter may vote in any one party's primary election. Though primary elections often include any number of constitutional amendments, initiated measures, or referred measures placed on the ballot by petition, none were included in this particular election.

== General election ==
On Tuesday, November 6, concurrent with other statewide elections across the United States, North Dakota voters selected one United States Senator, one United States Representative, Secretary of State, Attorney General, and several other statewide executive and judicial branch offices. Voters in odd-numbered legislative districts also selected their representatives to the North Dakota House of Representatives and North Dakota Senate. Finally, voters faced four ballot measures.

=== United States Senator ===
Incumbent Democratic–NPL Senator Heidi Heitkamp ran for reelection to a second term, but was defeated by Republican United States Representative Kevin Cramer.

2018 United States Senate election in North Dakota
Party	Candidate	Votes	%
Republican	Kevin Cramer	179,720	55.11%
Democratic–NPL	Heidi Heitkamp (incumbent)	144,376	44.27%
Write-in		2,042	0.63%
Total votes		326,138	100%

=== United States Representative ===
Though incumbent Republican Kevin Cramer had announced that he would run for re-election to a fourth term, he later decided to run for the Senate instead. Republican state Senator Kelly Armstrong defeated Democratic-NPL former state Senate Minority Leader Mac Schneider for the open seat.

2018 United States House of Representatives election in North Dakota
Party	Candidate	Votes	%
Republican	Kelly Armstrong	193,568	60.20%
Democratic–NPL	Mac Schneider	114,377	35.57%
Independent	Charles Tuttle	13,066	4.06%
Write-in		521	0.16%
Total votes		321,532	100.00%

=== Secretary of state ===
Six-term incumbent Republican secretary of state Alvin Jaeger was not re-endorsed by his party to serve a seventh term, so did not run for his party's nomination. When nominated Republican Will Gardner withdrew from the general election, Jaeger collected enough valid signatures to appear on the ballot as an independent. No candidate appeared on the ballot with the label of Republican.

The incumbent defeated two challengers, including two-term Democratic-NPL state representative Joshua Boschee.

Governing magazine projected the race as being a likely victory for Jaeger.

North Dakota Secretary of State election, 2018
Party	Candidate	Votes	%
Independent	Alvin (Al) Jaeger	145,275	47.28
Democratic–NPL	Joshua Boschee	120,475	39.21
Independent	Michael Coachman	40,590	13.21
Write-in		937	0.30
Total votes		307,277	100.00

=== Attorney general ===
2018 North Dakota Attorney General election
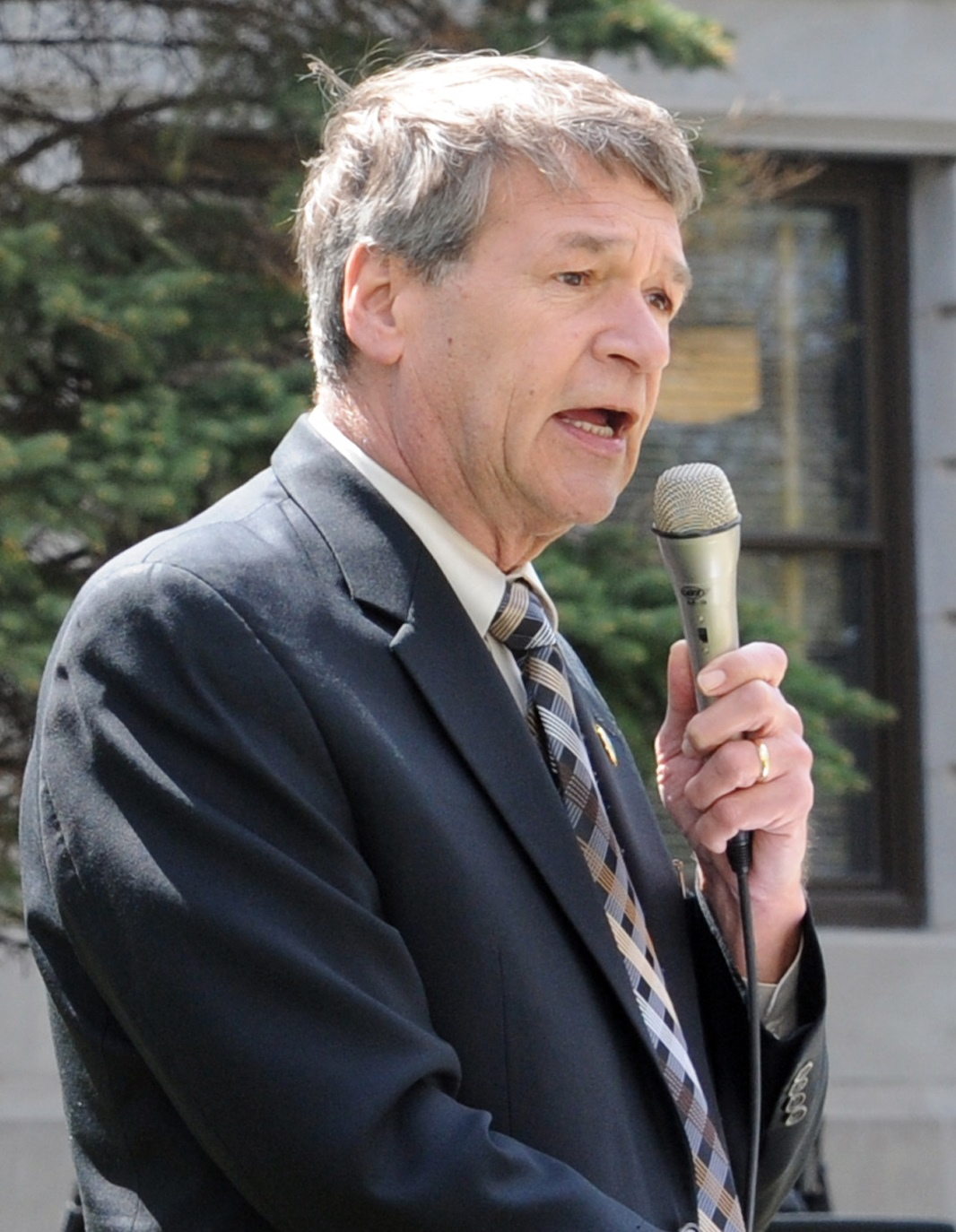

Nominee	Wayne Stenehjem	David Thompson
Party	Republican	Democratic–NPL
Popular vote	215,633	102,869
Percentage	67.5%	32.2%
- County results Stenehjem: 40–50% 50–60% 60–70% 70–80% 80–90% Thompson: 70–80%
Attorney General before election
Wayne Stenehjem
Republican
Elected Attorney General
Wayne Stenehjem
Republican

Incumbent Republican attorney general Wayne Stenehjem won re-election against his Democratic-NPL challenger, trial attorney David Thompson.

==== Predictions ====
Source	Ranking	As of
Governing	Safe R	October 26, 2018

=== Other statewide races ===
Commissioner of Agriculture results by county Goehring: 50–60%; 60–70%; 70–80%; 80–90%; Dotzenrod: 50–60%; 70–80%

Public Service Commissioner results by county Christmann: 50–60%; 60–70%; 70–80%; 80–90%; Brandt: 50–60%; 70–80%; 80–90%

Public Service Commissioner special results by county Kroshus: 50–60%; 60–70%; 70–80%; 80–90%; Buchmann: 50–60%; 70–80%; 80–90%

Tax Commissioner results by county Rauschenberger: 40–50%; 50–60%; 60–70%; 70–80%; 80–90%; Oversen: 50–60%; 70–80%; 80–90%

All North Dakota voters faced partisan races for Agriculture Commissioner, Tax Commissioner, one full term seat and one partial term seat on the Public Service Commission, and a nonpartisan ten-year term as Justice of the Supreme Court

=== State legislative races ===
24 seats in the North Dakota Senate and 48 seats in the North Dakota House of Representatives were up for election. Voters in all odd-numbered districts had those races on their ballot.

=== Measures ===
Voters faced four measures placed on the ballot by petition. They passed Measure 1, which would establish government ethics rules and an ethics commission; the secretary of state approved it for the ballot on July 24. They also passed Measure 2, which removes language in the state constitution currently guaranteeing all citizens to right to vote and replaces it with language banning non-citizens from voting; it had been approved on August 10. Measure 3 would have legalized the recreational use of marijuana, but was not passed. They did, however, approve Measure 4, which establishes personalized vehicle plates for volunteer emergency responders.

Measure 1 Results by county Yes: 60–70%; 50–60%; No: 70–80%; 60–70%; 50–60%

Measure 2 Results by county Yes: 70–80%; 60–70%; 50–60%

Measure 3 Results by county No: 80–90%; 70–80%; 60–70%; 50–60%; Yes: 70–80%; 50–60%

Measure 4 Results by county Yes: 70–80%; 60–70%; 50–60%; No: 50–60%
