= Alvin Jaeger =

American politician

Al Jaeger
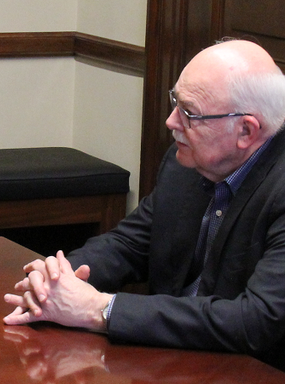

Secretary of State of North Dakota
- In office January 1, 1993 – January 1, 2023
- Governor: Ed Schafer; John Hoeven; Jack Dalrymple; Doug Burgum
- Preceded by: Jim Kusler
- Succeeded by: Michael Howe

Personal details
- Born: December 10, 1943 (age 81) Beulah, North Dakota, U.S.
- Political party: Republican
- Education: Bismarck State College (AA); Dickinson State University (BS); University of North Dakota; Montana State University

Alvin A. Jaeger (born December 10, 1943) is an American politician and member of the Republican Party who served as the Secretary of State of North Dakota from 1993 to 2023. Jaeger was elected to the office in 1992, and re-elected in 1996, 2000, 2004, 2006, 2010, 2014 and 2018.

== Biography ==
Al Jaeger was born in Beulah, North Dakota in 1943. He was raised there and he graduated in 1961 from Beulah High School. He attended Bismarck State College and in 1963 earned an Associate of Arts degree. In 1966, he received a Bachelor of Science degree from Dickinson State University, majoring in Business Education with a minor in Speech. He also completed post-graduate work at the University of North Dakota in 1968 and at Montana State University in 1970.

During his high school and college years, Jaeger worked for his father's excavating and ready-mix concrete company. After graduating from Dickinson State, he taught at Killdeer High School for three years and then at Kenmare High School for another two years. Upon moving to Fargo, North Dakota in 1971, Jaeger worked for two years for the Mobil Oil Corporation as a marketing analyst. From 1973 to 1992, Jaeger was self-employed as a real estate broker and owned his own real estate brokerage business in Fargo.

Jaeger became North Dakota's fourteenth Secretary of State in 1993, and was reelected in 1996, 2000, 2004, 2006, 2010 and 2014.

In April 2018, Jaeger was defeated by Will Gardner at the North Dakota Republican Party convention, who thus secured the Republican nomination. The following month, Gardner withdrew from the race after revelations that he had pleaded guilty to a charge of disorderly conduct in January 2006. Jaeger had said that he wouldn't run for re-election but with only Democratic-NPL candidate Josh Boschee on the ballot, Jaeger changed his mind and ran as an independent. He won the election with 47.27% of the vote and announced on election night that he would retire upon the conclusion of his eighth term.

He resides in Bismarck with his two daughters and a stepson from his wife Kathy, who died in 2016.

== Electoral history ==
1992 North Dakota Secretary of State election
Party	Candidate	Votes	%
Republican	Alvin Jaeger	151,864	52.06
Democratic–NPL	Jim Kusler	139,860	47.94

1996 North Dakota Secretary of State election
Party	Candidate	Votes	%
Republican	Alvin Jaeger	149,344	58.62
Democratic–NPL	Shelley Seeberg	105,419	41.38

2000 North Dakota Secretary of State election
Party	Candidate	Votes	%
Republican	Alvin Jaeger	178,950	65.56
Democratic–NPL	Dennis Bercier	94,024	34.44

2004 North Dakota Secretary of State election
Party	Candidate	Votes	%
Republican	Alvin Jaeger	193,061	65.16
Democratic–NPL	Douglas Melby	103,223	34.84

2006 North Dakota Secretary of State election
Party	Candidate	Votes	%
Republican	Alvin Jaeger	115,341	53.92
Democratic–NPL	Kristin Hedger	98,583	46.08

2010 North Dakota Secretary of State election
Party	Candidate	Votes	%
Republican	Alvin Jaeger	145,882	62.44
Democratic–NPL	Corey Mock	87,519	37.46
Write-in		222	0.10

2014 North Dakota Secretary of State election
Party	Candidate	Votes	%
Republican	Alvin Jaeger	152,085	62.39
Democratic–NPL	April Fairfield	78,474	32.19
Libertarian	Roland Riemers	12,920	5.30
Write-in		278	0.11
Total votes		243,757	100.00

2018 North Dakota Secretary of State election
Party	Candidate	Votes	%
Independent	Alvin (Al) Jaeger	144,620	47.27
Democratic–NPL	Joshua Boschee	119,983	39.22
Independent	Michael Coachman	40,385	13.20
Write-in		930	0.30
Total votes		305,918	100.00

Party political offices
Preceded by Dave Koland	Republican nominee for Secretary of State of North Dakota; 1992, 1996, 2000, 2004, 2006, 2010, 2014	Succeeded by Will Gardner
Political offices
Preceded by Jim Kusler	Secretary of State of North Dakota; 1993–2023	Succeeded by Michael Howe
