= Wayne Stenehjem =

American politician (1953–2022)

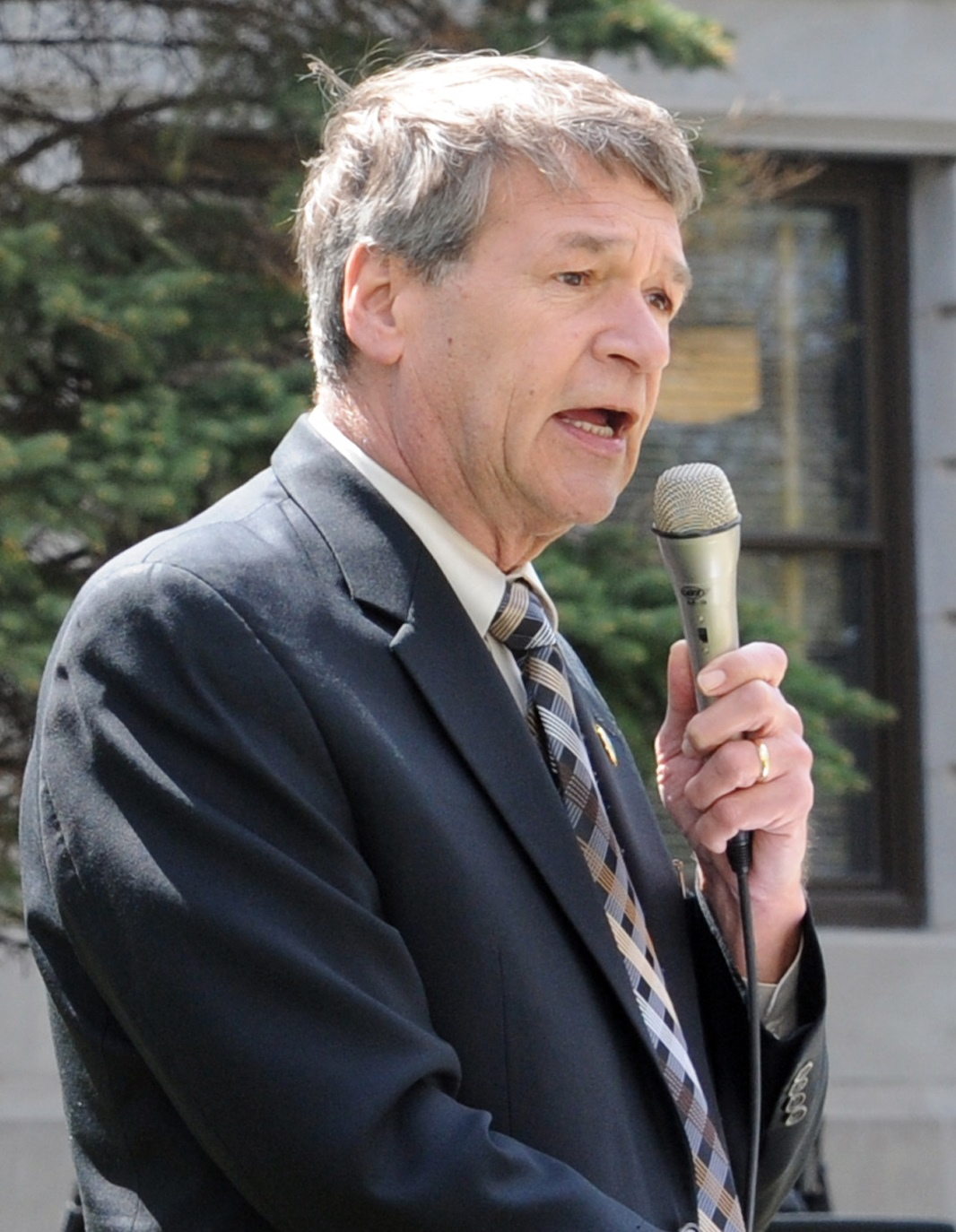

29th Attorney General of North Dakota
- In office December 15, 2000 – January 28, 2022
- Governor: John Hoeven; Jack Dalrymple; Doug Burgum
- Preceded by: Heidi Heitkamp
- Succeeded by: Drew Wrigley

Member of the North Dakota Senate
- In office 1980–2000

Member of the North Dakota House of Representatives
- In office 1976–1980

Personal details
- Born: February 5, 1953 Mohall, North Dakota, U.S.
- Died: January 28, 2022 (aged 68) Bismarck, North Dakota, U.S.
- Party: Republican
- Spouse: Beth Bakke Stenehjem
- Children: 1
- Relatives: Bob Stenehjem (brother)
- Education: Bismarck State College; University of North Dakota (BA, JD)

Wayne Stenehjem (/ˈstɛndʒəm/ STEN-jəm; February 5, 1953 – January 28, 2022) was an American lawyer and politician who served as the 29th Attorney General of North Dakota from 2000 until his death in 2022. He sought the Republican nomination for governor of North Dakota in 2016 but lost the primary to Doug Burgum on June 14 by 20%.

== Biography ==
Stenehjem was born in Mohall, North Dakota. He graduated from Bismarck High School in 1971 and Bismarck State College in 1972. He attended the University of North Dakota and the UND School of Law, graduating in 1977. Stenehjem was elected to the North Dakota House of Representatives in 1976, and served two terms there until 1980, when he was elected to the North Dakota Senate. He served in that capacity until 2000, when he became Attorney General of North Dakota. As Attorney General, Stenehjem proposed legislation to curb methamphetamine use and addiction in the state, by restricting retail sales of certain products used in its manufacture, providing mandatory treatment for first-time drug offenders, and increasing criminal penalties for drug offenders. Stenehjem was reelected in 2004, 2006, 2010, 2014 and 2018 by wide margins. Before his death, he had announced he would not run for reelection in 2022. Stenehjem was hospitalized in Bismarck for an inflamed ulcer on January 28, 2022. He died later that day, at the age of 68.

He was married to Beth Bakke Stenehjem, and had one son, Andrew. He was the brother of North Dakota Senate Majority Leader Bob Stenehjem (1952–2011) and former North Dakota House of Representatives member Allan Stenehjem (who is now a lobbyist).

== Career ==
- North Dakota House of Representatives (1976–1980)
- North Dakota Senate (1980–2000)
  - Chairman of the Senate Judiciary Committee (1995–2000)
- North Dakota Attorney General (2000–2022)

== Controversies ==
In 2014, Agent Arnie Rummel, who worked under the North Dakota Bureau of Criminal Investigation, under the supervision of the Attorney General's office, was charged in Dickey County District Court with two misdemeanors. Business owner Darrell Schrum accused Rummel of violating his constitutional rights when the BCI damaged personal property and seized Schrum's payloader and transported it out of state. Rummel had secured a warrant to seize the equipment, suspected as stolen, and Stenehjem's office defended Rummel in the long-running dispute that ensued.

Stenehjem said, "All he did was return a payloader that was stolen to the rightful owner." But Schrum's attorney argued that the trucking company Rummel gave the loader to had no legal ownership and that the search warrant required Rummel only to deliver the loader to the court. Rummel was found in contempt of court and the case resulted in a cash settlement for Schrum, as the payloader was found to have been unlawfully seized.

While Attorney General, Stenehjem purportedly misled investigators and deleted phone calls/ voicemails he received from Ray Holmberg who was investigated for, and later convicted of, engaging in child sex tourism.

== Electoral history ==
North Dakota Attorney General Election, 2000
Party	Candidate	Votes	%
Republican	Wayne Stenehjem	157,986	55.74
Democratic–NPL	Glenn Pomeroy	125,466	44.26
Total votes		283,452	100.00

North Dakota Attorney General Election, 2004
Party	Candidate	Votes	%
Republican	Wayne Stenehjem (inc.)	218,599	72.54
Democratic–NPL	Bruce Schoenwald	82,754	27.46
Total votes		301,353	100.00

North Dakota Attorney General Election, 2006
Party	Candidate	Votes	%
Republican	Wayne Stenehjem (inc.)	148,194	68.86
Democratic–NPL	Bill Brudvik	67,032	31.14
Total votes		215,226	100.00

North Dakota Attorney General Election, 2010
Party	Candidate	Votes	%
Republican	Wayne Stenehjem (inc.)	175,627	74.55
Democratic–NPL	Jeanette Boechler	59,781	25.38
Write-in		174	0.07
Total votes		235,582	100.00

North Dakota Attorney General Election, 2014
Party	Candidate	Votes	%
Republican	Wayne Stenehjem (inc.)	181,678	74.06
Democratic–NPL	Kiara Kraus-Parr	63,255	25.78
Write-in		395	0.16
Total votes		245,328	100.00

North Dakota Governor Republican Primary Election, 2016
Party	Candidate	Votes	%
Republican	Doug Burgum	68,042	59.47
Republican	Wayne Stenehjem	44,158	38.59
Republican	Paul Sorum	2,164	1.89
Republican	Write-in	51	0.04
Total votes		114,415	100.00

North Dakota Attorney General Election, 2018
Party	Candidate	Votes	%
Republican	Wayne Stenehjem (inc.)	215,633	67.55
Democratic–NPL	David Thompson	102,869	32.23
Write-in		715	0.22
Total votes		319,217	100.00

Party political offices
Preceded by Ward K. Johnson	Republican nominee for North Dakota Attorney General; 2000, 2004, 2006, 2010, 2014, 2018	Succeeded by Drew Wrigley
Legal offices
Preceded by Heidi Heitkamp	Attorney General of North Dakota; 2000–2022	Succeeded by Troy Seibel; Acting
