= North Dakota Office of State Tax Commissioner =

North Dakota state government agency

The Office of State Tax Commissioner is a North Dakota state government agency responsible for licensing:

- alcoholic beverage wholesalers, farm wineries, microbrew pubs, and out-of-state direct shippers, and
- all suppliers selling or shipping alcoholic beverages to liquor and beer wholesalers in North Dakota

and for taxing:

- alcoholic beverage wholesalers, farm wineries, microbrew pubs, and out-of-state direct shippers.

Responsibility for licensing alcoholic beverage retail businesses lies with the state attorney general.

== History ==
North Dakota is the only state that elects its tax commissioner.

The current commissioner is Brian Kroshus, who was appointed by Governor Doug Burgum in 2022 after the resignation of Ryan Rauschenberger.

The office has been used as a pathway to larger roles in North Dakota government; recent tax commissioners have run for governor, attorney general, and the U.S. House. Former North Dakota U.S. senators Byron Dorgan, Kent Conrad, and Heidi Heitkamp all previously served as tax commissioners of the state.

The office was an appointed position from 1919 to 1940, and an elected position on the no-party ballot from 1940 to 1987, and an elected position on a party ballot since 1987.

Party information given for the commissioners who served before 1940 is based on the party of the governor of North Dakota who appointed them to the position. From 1940 to 1987, the office became an elected position, but was placed on the no party ballot. Since 1987, the office has been placed on a party-affiliated ballot.

#	Name	Term	Party
1	George E. Wallace	1919–1921	Republican/NPL
2	C. C. Converse	1922–1925	Republican
3	Thorstein H. H. Thoresen	1925–1929	Republican/NPL
4	Iver A. Acker	1929–1932	Republican
5	Frank A. Vogel	1933	Republican/NPL
6	J. J. Weeks	1933–1935	Republican/NPL
7	Lee Nichols	1935–1937	Republican
8	John Kenneth Murray	1937	Republican/NPL
9	Owen T. Owen	1937–1938	Republican/NPL
10	Claude P. Stone	1938–1939	Republican/NPL
11	William T. DePuy	1939	Democratic
12	Lee Nichols	1939	Republican
13	John Gray	1939–1952	Democratic
14	Burtis B. Conyne	1952	Nonpartisan
15	J. Arthur Engen	1953–1963	Nonpartisan
16	Lloyd Omdahl	1963–1966	Nonpartisan (Democratic-NPL)
17	Edwin O. Sjaastad	1966–1969	Nonpartisan
18	Byron Dorgan	1969–1980	Nonpartisan (Democratic-NPL)
19	Kent Conrad	1981–1986	Nonpartisan (Democratic-NPL)
20	Heidi Heitkamp	1986–1992	Democratic-NPL
21	Robert E. Hanson	1993–1995	Democratic-NPL
22	Rick Clayburgh	1996–2005	Republican
23	Cory Fong	2005–2013	Republican
24	Ryan Rauschenberger	2013–2022	Republican
25	Brian Kroshus	2022–	Republican
