= Minnie J. Nielson =

American politician (1874–1958)

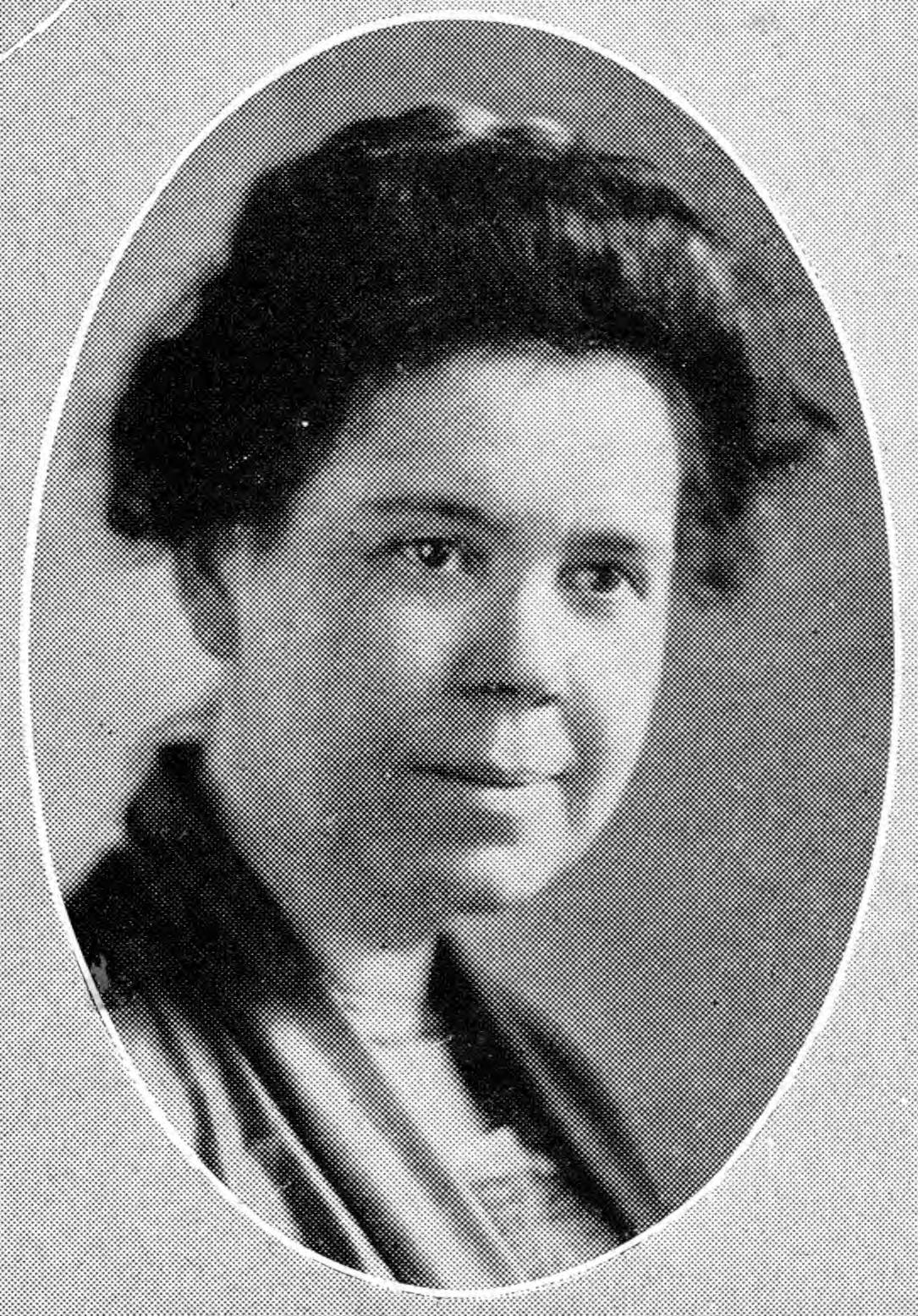

11th North Dakota Superintendent of Public Instruction
- In office 1919–1926
- Preceded by: Neil C. Macdonald
- Succeeded by: Bertha R. Palmer

Personal details
- Born: Minnie J. Nielson; January 18, 1874 Jackson, Michigan, U.S.
- Died: February 27, 1958 (aged 84) Valley City, North Dakota, U.S.

Minnie Jean Nielson (January 18, 1874 – February 27, 1958) was an American educator and literacy activist from North Dakota. She served as the eleventh North Dakota Superintendent of Public Instruction from 1919 to 1926.

== Early life ==
Nielson was born in Jackson, Michigan, on January 18, 1874, to Scottish parents James Wylie Nelson and Mary Hallady Stewart. In 1880, Wylie Nielson, with his wife and three children, relocated to Dakota Territory, settling in present-day Barnes County, North Dakota.

Wylie Nielson had sold his hardware store in Jackson and opened an agricultural supplies store with James Baille. The Nielson family was among the earliest settlers of the Valley City area.

== Education ==
Nielson attended school in Valley City, North Dakota. After graduating high school there, she attended the University of North Dakota, the University of Michigan, and the University of Chicago.

In 1919, Fargo College honored Nielson with a Doctor of Laws degree to commemorate her achievements as an educator and for her work with liberty loan drives during World War I.

== Early career ==
Nielson taught physics and chemistry at Valley City High School. She also had experience with rural schools and grade schools.

In 1906, she was elected Superintendent of Barnes County Schools and served in this role for twelve years. During her time in this role, she became known for her frequent travels throughout the county in her bright red Maxwell automobile, which was one of the first automobiles in Valley City.

== Superintendent of Public Instruction ==
Minnie J. Nielson served as the eleventh North Dakota Superintendent of Public Instruction from 1919 to 1926. She was the third woman to be elected to the office. The last woman to serve as state superintendent was Emma F. Bates in 1896.

=== 1918 campaign and election ===
The months preceding the election of 1918 came at a turbulent time in the United States. The influenza pandemic was spreading, and World War I was still being fought in Europe.

Politically, it was also a fluctuating time for the state of North Dakota. The Nonpartisan League (NPL) had risen to prominence in the state. In the 1916 gubernatorial election, Lynn Frazier, the NPL candidate, won in a landslide. The party's candidate for Attorney General, William Langer, was also elected with a vast majority of the votes. By 1918, the NPL had majority control of both houses of the state legislature.

During this period, Nielson decided to run for the office of Superintendent of Public Instruction, which was the only state office open to women at the time. During her campaign for the primary and general elections, she received the endorsement of the Lincoln League, Democrats, and the Independent Voters Association (IVA), which was the main opposition to the NPL.

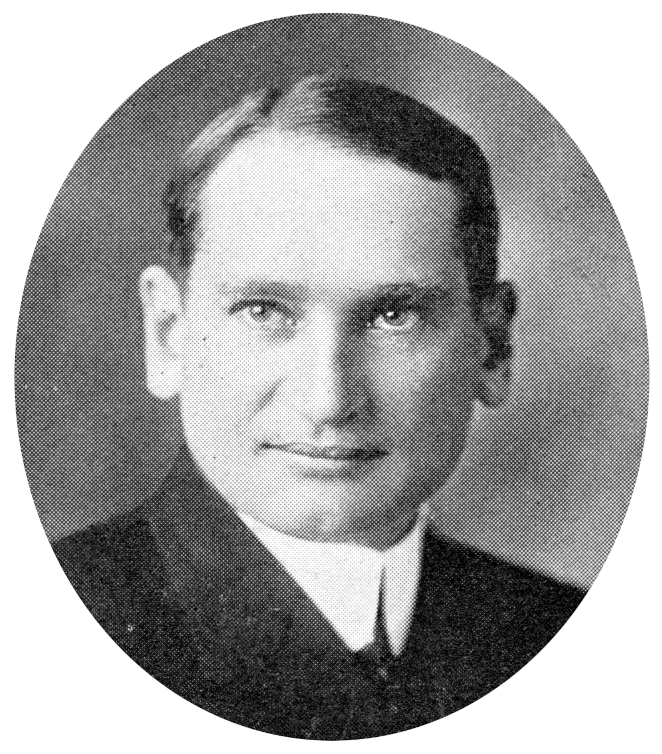
William Langer, N.D. Attorney General, circa 1919

Leading up to the 1918 election, Nielson was attacked by the NPL, especially by their candidate Neil C. Macdonald. Articles began appearing in pro-NPL newspapers questioning her legal qualifications for the position. The biggest issue from Nielson's opponents revolved around the fact that she had attended multiple colleges and universities, but she had not earned any degrees from them.

Publicly, Macdonald focused on the qualification issue, but in private he was much more blunt toward Nielson. In a September 1918 letter, he wrote, "They have a Miss Nielson after me; a dear, fat old maid, who is making a campaign on three issues, namely: One, that she is a woman, second, that she is poorly educated, and therefore anything and everything can teach school if she is elected, third, that she and her friends are against the League, and fourth that she is a Scandinavian; all of which is true except the last one, for it happens that her father and mother were born in Scotland. She is trying to work the nationality racket."

Nielson turned to an unlikely ally: William Langer, the NPL-endorsed Attorney General. A rift had been forming between Langer and the NPL. Langer began distancing himself from the party, criticizing party leaders, and even running against Lynn Frazier in the 1920 gubernatorial election, but he narrowly lost in the primaries. He also began siding against the NPL in his role as Attorney General, especially when it came to Nielson.

About two weeks before the election, Nielson asked Langer to issue an opinion on whether she met the legal qualifications to serve as the state superintendent or not. On October 29, 1918, Langer issued a statement validating her as a legitimate candidate, having met all of the necessary criteria. However, Nielson's troubles with the NPL would continue.

Nielson also went on the offensive, attacking Macdonald for his connection to the NPL and their socialist leanings.

After a tough campaign, Nielson defeated incumbent Macdonald, the NPL-endorsed candidate, by more than 5,500 votes. With this victory, Nielson was the only candidate to win a statewide position who was not endorsed by the NPL.

=== First weeks in office and the 1919 legislative session ===
Nielson's first weeks in office were troublesome. In early January 1919, Nielson and her staff arrived in Bismarck at the Capitol to move into the office of the Superintendent of Public Instruction. Outgoing state superintendent Neil C. Macdonald and his deputy Katherine Macdonald, who also happened to be his wife, refused to leave the office and relinquish their duties.

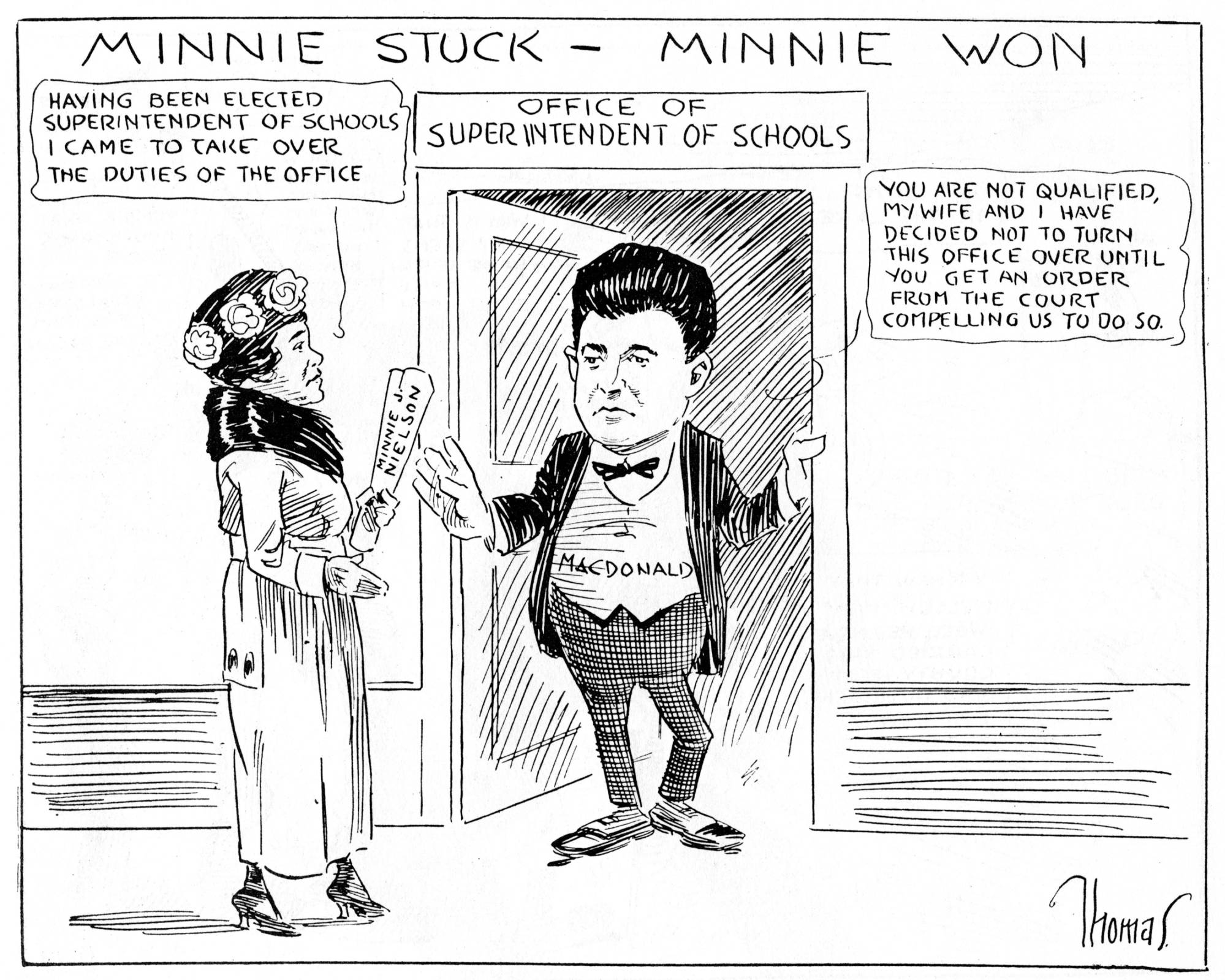
1919 cartoon from The Red Flame magazine portraying Neil C. Macdonald blocking Minnie J. Nielson from entering the office of the North Dakota Superintendent of Public Instruction.

Nielson again turned to Langer, who brought the matter before the North Dakota Supreme Court. A couple of days after Nielson's initial confrontation with Macdonald, the Supreme Court heard the case and issued their ruling in favor of Nielson. Macdonald continued to challenge Nielson's legitimacy, but with the support of Langer and Assistant Attorney General Edward B. Cox, Nielson was able to keep winning the legal battles. Langer stated, "Miss Nielson is the legally elected superintendent of public instruction of the state, and I'll fight her battles in every court of the state if necessary."

Around the same time of Nielson's trouble with Macdonald, the Sixteenth Legislative Assembly convened. There had been growing speculation prior to the start of the regular session that Governor Frazier and the NPL would push to overhaul the state's education system. This would include the duties of Nielson as Superintendent of Public Instruction, who has just defeated Frazier's long-time friend Macdonald in the election. On January 8, 1919, this speculation was essentially confirmed when Governor Frazier addressed the legislature and recommended the Board of Regents and Board of Education be abolished. He also recommended the responsibilities of these boards and certain powers from the state superintendent should be transferred to a new, consolidated board consisting of five or fewer members.

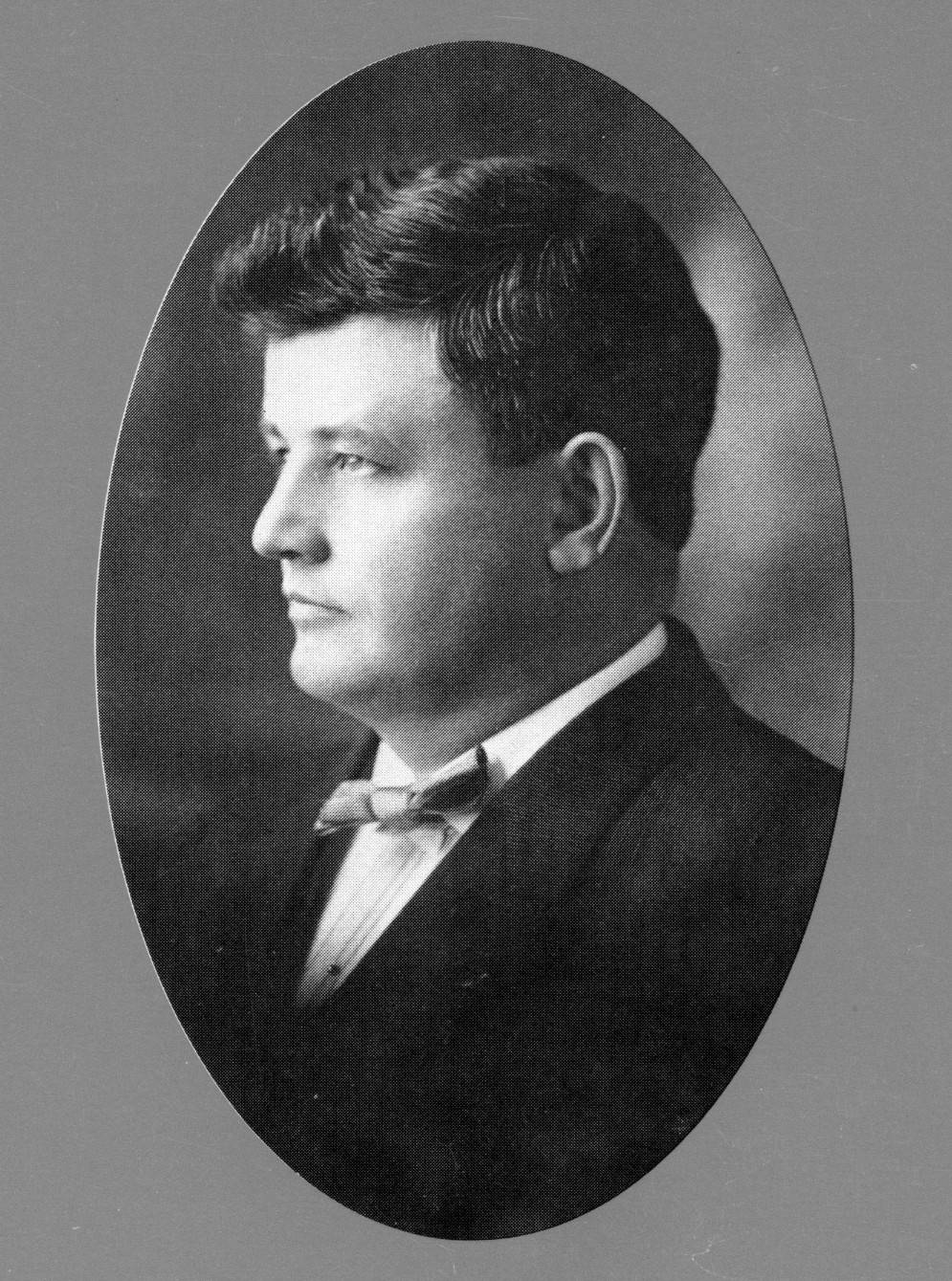
Neil C. Macdonald, 1915

After the supreme court ruling, the Macdonalds were escorted out of the state superintendent's office by Governor Frazier, along with the sheriff of Burleigh County. Outgoing superintendent Neil C. Macdonald made one final attempt to maintain control of the office. He demanded Nielson surrender the position to him. Nielson responded with, "I certainly do not intend to do so."

Only a couple of days earlier, Governor Frazier had given his address to the legislature, recommending they strip away powers from the state superintendent and give them to a new education board. A reporter for the Fargo Forum and Daily Republican asked Nielson for a statement on this. With the situations with the Macdonalds, the legislature, and the governor all happening at the same time, she simply replied, "My business is education, not politics. I do not care to discuss the situation at this time."

With full control of the house, senate, and governor's office, the NPL began passing sweeping reforms during the 1919 legislative sessions. Laws were passed creating the Bank of North Dakota, Mill and Elevator Association, Home Building Association, and the Industrial Commission to oversee these state-run intuitions.

Heeding the governor's recommendation, and the endorsement of many college and university leaders in the state, the legislature also created the Board of Administration. The board consisted of five members: the Commissioner of Agriculture and Labor, the Superintendent of Public Instruction, and three members appointed by the governor. This new board would administer all penal institutions, charitable and educational institutions, and oversee the public and common schools for the state. The law also stripped away many duties of the state superintendent. Nielson now had a statewide office but little authority. The Board of Administration would last until 1969 when it was replaced by the Director of Institutions.

=== Board of Administration ===
On July 26, 1919, the Board of Administration formally organized. Governor Frazier appointed George A. Totten, a former member of the Board of Regents; Robert Muir, a former member of the Board of Regents; and Patrick M. Casey, a former member of the Board of Control. The other two members were John N. Hagan, Commissioner of Agriculture and Labor; and Minnie Nielson, Superintendent of Public Instruction.

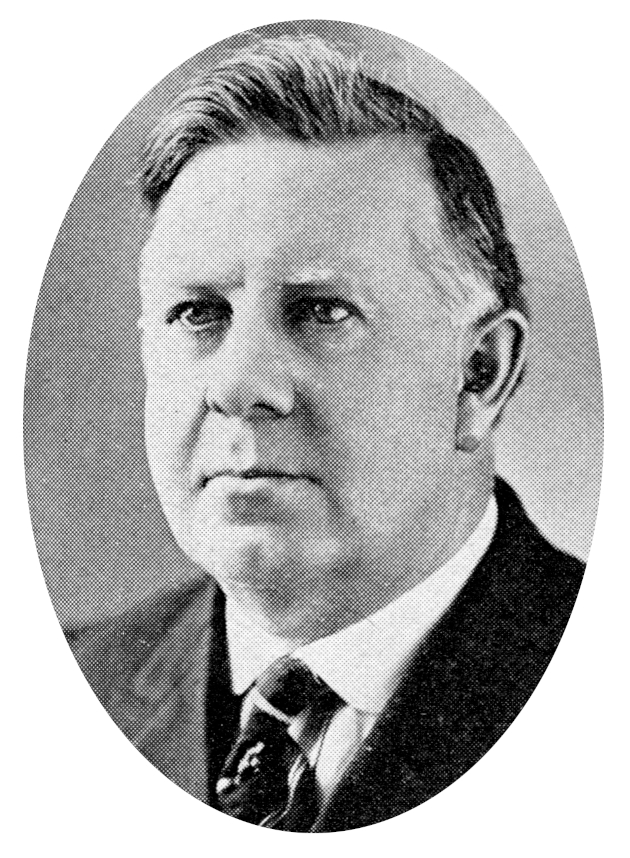
George A. Totten, Sr., Chair of the Board of Administration

To some, like the NPL, the creation of the Board of Administration was viewed as a way for the state to increase efficiency and save money by consolidation. However, others viewed the board as a political power grab of the NPL. Upon its creation, a majority of the board, four of the five members, had ties to the NPL. The board named Charles Liessman, former secretary for the Board of Regents, as their executive secretary. Liessman was also connected to the NPL.

The board appointed Neil C. Macdonald, the former state superintendent, to serve as educational advisor and general school inspector. The board paid him handsomely with a salary that was equal to Nielson's. However, he did not serve in this role very long, resigning in April 1920.

Nielson and Langer asked the Supreme Court to clarify if the legislature had the authority to remove duties of the Superintendent of Public Instruction. In October 1919, the Supreme Court ruled in favor of the legislature and the Board of Administration.

On November 1, 1919, George A. Totten, Chairman of the Board of Administration, submitted the entity's first annual report to the governor. In this report, the board submitted a recommendation to abolish the office of the state superintendent or make it a board-appointed position instead of an elected one. Nielson did not even get a chance to see this report before it was published.

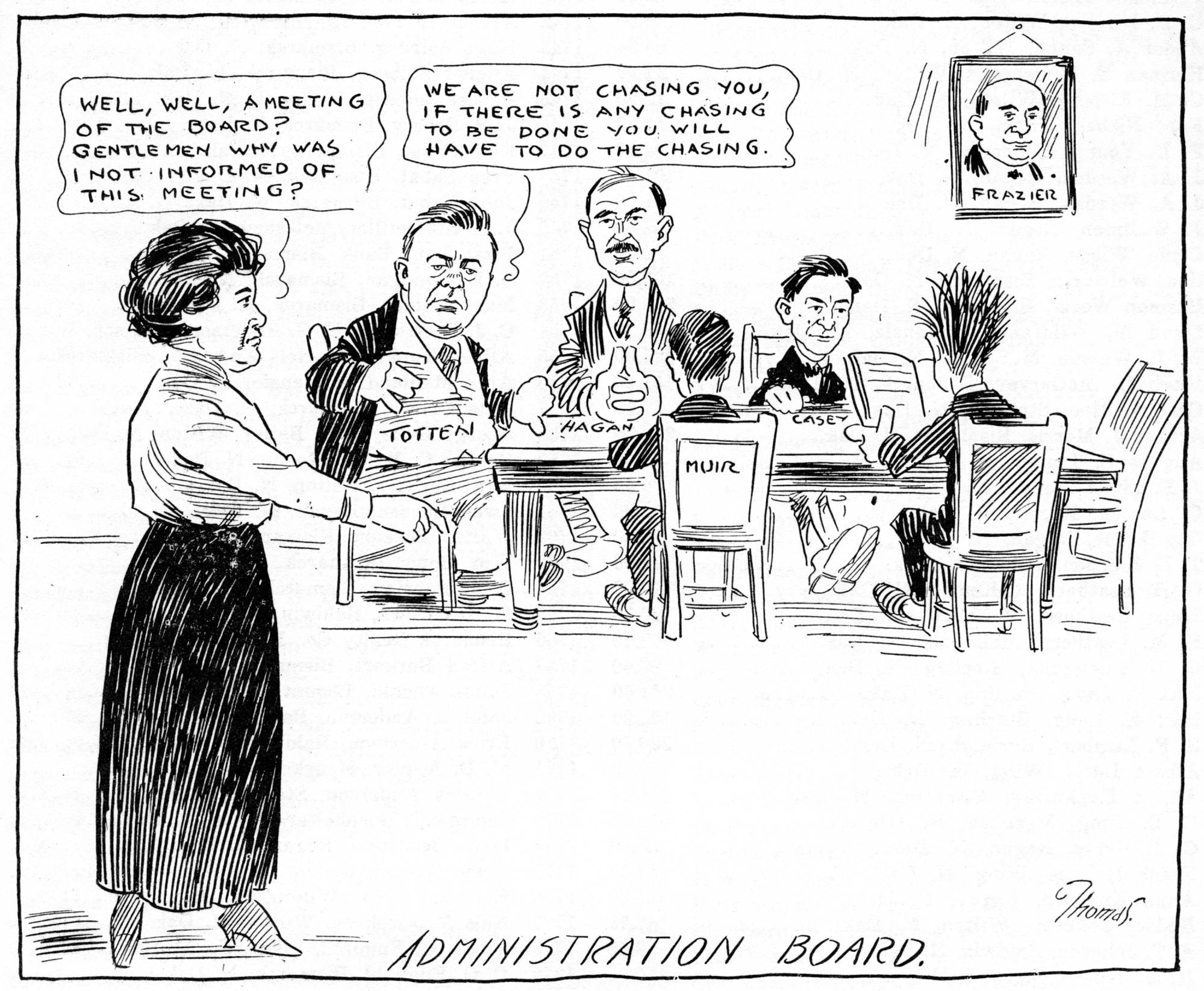
1920 cartoon from "The Red Flame" magazine portraying George A. Totten and the North Dakota Board of Administration excluding Minnie J. Nielson, Superintendent of Public Instruction, from meetings.

At the same time North Dakota was voting to support the women's suffrage movement by ratifying the Nineteenth Amendment to the U.S. Constitution during the special legislative session of 1919, it was made known that the Board of Administration was excluding Nielson, its only female member, from meetings and not providing her with meeting minutes. The board had been holding meetings haphazardly, sometimes without Nielson in attendance. When Nielson protested the board meeting without her, Chairman Totten reportedly replied, "We're not going to chase after you every time there's a meeting. If you want to attend the meetings, you'll have to do the chasing."

In December 1919, Nielson, as a member of the Board of Administration, made statements about being excluded when called to testify before the House's committee investigating the state library for controversial items within their collections. During the backdrop of the First Red Scare, and a growing concern that the NPL had socialist leanings, there were accusations that items within the traveling collection were related to free love, Bolshevism, socialism, and/or anarchism. The Independent Voters Association (IVA) used these books and the exclusion of Nielson to their advantage by publicly challenging and smearing the NPL and the Board of Administration.

The Board of Administration and the State Library Commission were later exonerated once the investigation concluded. One positive outcome of the book uproar was the Board of Administration adopting better procedures and backing away from its plan to eliminate the state superintendent position.

The NPL, on the other hand, took a hit from this political battle.

=== Decline of the NPL and the election of 1920 ===
By late 1918 and into the early 1920s, the NPL began to decline. Factors such as accusations of socialism, political infighting, drought, declining grain prices, and economic hardship contributed to the decline of public support for the party.

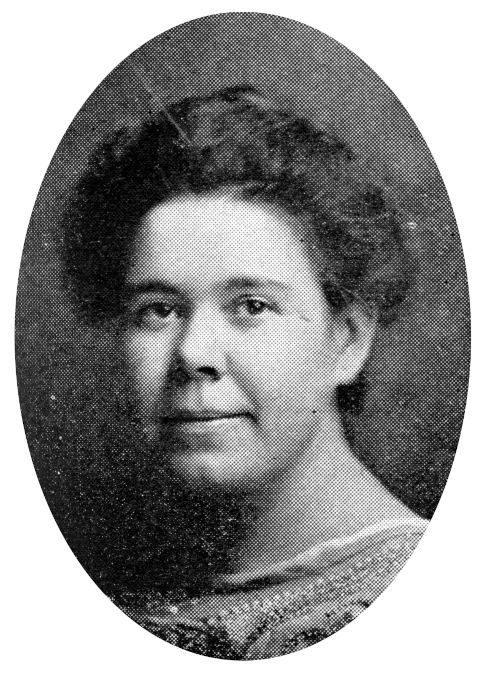
Minnie Nielson, ND Superintendent of Public Instruction, circa 1919

Opponents of the NPL formed the Independent Voters Association (IVA) in 1918. The IVA slowly gained traction, taking control of one legislative house in 1920 and successfully holding a recall election that deposed Governor Frazier in 1921. John N. Hagan, the NPL Commissioner of Agriculture and Labor, was also removed from office.

Nielson outlasted the NPL's control over state government and was re-elected in 1920. She had been endorsed by the IVA. An initiated measure was also approved by voters during the 1920 election which transferred some powers back to the Superintendent of Public Instruction. This included teacher certification, standardization of schools, and examinations for eighth grade and high school students.

=== Remaining years in office ===
Nielson's remaining years in office were much less turbulent. Nielson would be re-elected again in 1922 and 1924. She decided to step down when her term ended in 1926.

Nielson was a champion of literacy. Throughout her life, she made it her mission to fight illiteracy in children and adults. During her time as state superintendent, she sponsored a night school program for adults in counties across the country, teaching them to read and write. Hazel Nielson, Minnie's sister and deputy superintendent, was also heavily involved in this initiative.

== Later career ==
After leaving office, Nielson moved to Washington, D.C., and was involved with the National Illiteracy Crusade from 1929 to 1931. From 1931 to 1938, she worked across the country with various state departments of education to fight illiteracy. In 1938, she came back to North Dakota and served in a leading role for the Teachers' Insurance and Retirement Fund from that year until 1950.

== Personal life ==
Nielson was energetic, outgoing, and had a passion for education. She never married.

Nielson was active in the North Dakota Federation of Women's Clubs, North Dakota Education Association, National Education Association, P.E.O. Sisterhood, American Legion Auxiliary, Congregational Church, and the Girl Scouts.

Nielson had an interest in singing and music, encouraging them during her roles as county and state superintendent. In 1926, she requested poet James Foley to write a song about North Dakota. Foley wrote a song that would eventually be adopted as the hymn for the state of North Dakota.

== Death ==
Nielson died on February 27, 1958. She is buried at Woodbine Cemetery in Valley City, North Dakota.

== See also ==
- List of North Dakota superintendents of public instruction
- North Dakota Department of Public Instruction

Political offices
Preceded by Neil C. Macdonald	North Dakota Superintendent of Public Instruction; 1919–1926	Succeeded by Bertha R. Palmer
