= George A. Totten =

American politician (1870 – 1955)

George A. Totten Sr.
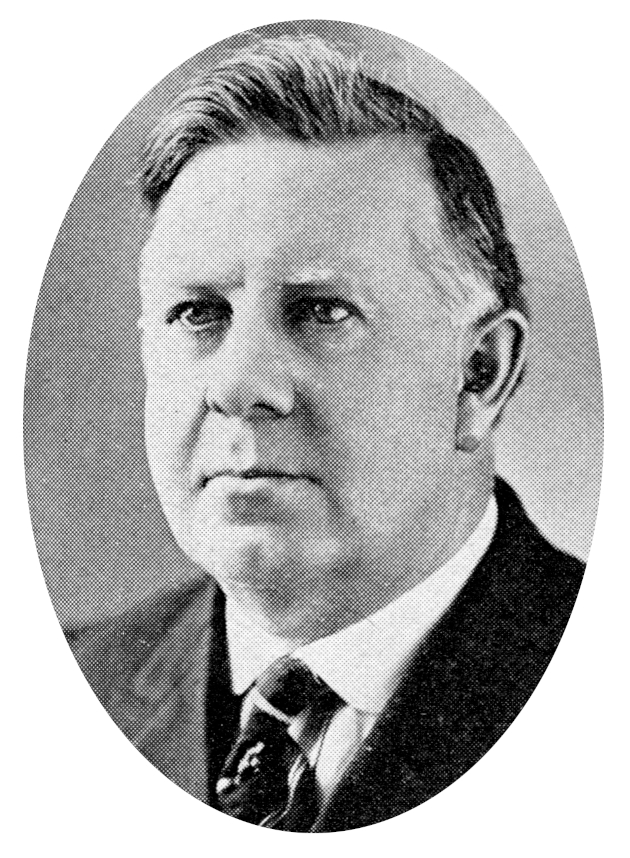
- Totten, circa 1919

North Dakota Board of Regents
- In office 1917–1919
- Governor: Lynn Frazier

North Dakota Board of Administration
- In office 1919–1921
- Governor: Lynn Frazier
- Governor: Ragnvald Nestos

Personal details
- Born: 1870 England
- Died: 1955 (aged 84–85) Minneapolis, Minnesota, US
- Party: Nonpartisan League
- Spouse: Mary H. Bryne

George A. Totten Sr. (1870 – 1955) was an American minister, newspaper publisher, and politician. He served on the now-defunct North Dakota Board of Regents (1917-1919) and the North Dakota Board of Administration (1919-1921).

== Early life, education, and early career ==
=== Early years ===
George A. Totten Sr. was born in England in 1870. His parents were Rev. Matthew J. Totten and Clara (Parker) Totten. In 1884, the family immigrated to Ontario, Canada. Totten received a mix of private and public education in England and Canada. He was also educated for the ministry, following in his father's footsteps. In 1899, he immigrated to the United States. He was then involved in missionary work in New Jersey, Pennsylvania, and Michigan. In 1906, Totten moved to North Dakota and was ordained a Congregational minister in 1907. He served several churches in the state, particularly in Nelson County.

=== Bowman newspaper ===
Totten then moved to Bowman, North Dakota. After serving a couple of years as a minister in Bowman, Totten resigned. Some sources claim he was forced to resign due to his liberal political views. After his brother, Edward Totten, stepped down as editor of the Bowman Citizen, George took over the newspaper.

During this time, the Totten brothers became engrossed in a political battle with a local banker and rancher, James E. Phelan. The Tottens were liberal and Phelan was conservative. The Tottens' newspaper was critical of the wealthy Phelan, who earned his money through entrepreneurship and working for the railroad. This resulted in multiple libel lawsuits against the Totten-run paper.

Undeterred, the newspaper continued its campaign against Phelan. Eventually, the libel lawsuits took their toll and George A. Totten Sr. was forced out. He left the state in early 1914, moving to Tennessee, and turned the newspaper over to his son, George A. Totten Jr.

George Sr. was not gone long. He moved back to North Dakota in early 1915 to set up an abstract office in Wahpeton. However, he did not stay there long either, eventually returning to Bowman.

Totten returned to his old publishing duties and attempted to turn the Bowman Citizen into an organ of reform and a voice for the Nonpartisan League (NPL). However, many local business withdrew their advertisements with the newspaper at the persuasion of Phelan. The Tottens were forced to sell the Bowman Citizen, but not before the newspaper published a lengthy article about how they were being squeezed out.

== Politics ==
Totten was liberal in his political beliefs and a supporter of progressivism. In the 1910s, he became active in state politics. In 1914, he was featured on the "F. O. Hellstrom ticket" as a recommended candidate for the state's Railroad Commission. Totten became active in the Nonpartisan League (NPL) in the late 1910s.

=== Board of Regents ===
In early 1917, NPL Governor Lynn Frazier appointed Totten to the North Dakota Board of Regents, but his nomination was blocked by the senate. Totten was then employed by the NPL to help publish newspapers, editorials, and political cartoons.

Meanwhile, Gov. Frazier patiently waited for the terms of two current members of the board to expire. When they did in July 1917, Frazier again nominated Totten to the board, along with Robert Muir, who was the brother-in-law of NPL leader William Lemke. The issue of these appointments was presented to the North Dakota Supreme Court, with the NPL majority supporting the governor.

Totten served on the Board of Regents from 1917 to 1919.

=== Board of Administration ===
By 1919, the NPL had risen to prominence and had control over all three branches of state government. The NPL began passing its reforms during the 1919 legislative sessions.

In early 1919, there were rumors, prior to the start of the regular legislative session, that Governor Frazier and the NPL would push to overhaul the state's education system. On January 8, 1919, this speculation was confirmed when Gov. Frazier addressed the legislature and recommended the Board of Regents and Board of Education be abolished. He also recommended the responsibilities of these boards and certain powers from the state superintendent be transferred to a new, consolidated board consisting of five or fewer members.

Heeding the governor's recommendation, the legislature created the Board of Administration. The board would consist of five members: the Commissioner of Agriculture and Labor, the Superintendent of Public Instruction, and three members appointed by the governor. This new board would administer all penal institutions, charitable and educational institutions, and oversee the public and common schools for the state.

On July 26, 1919, the Board of Administration formally organized. Gov. Frazier appointed Totten, a former member of the Board of Regents; Robert Muir, a former member of the Board of Regents; and Patrick M. Casey, a former member of the Board of Control. The other two members were John N. Hagan, Commissioner of Agriculture and Labor; and Minnie Nielson, Superintendent of Public Instruction.

The supporters of the NPL viewed the creation of the Board of Administration as a way for the state to increase efficiency and save money through the consolidation. However, others, like the opponents of the NPL, viewed the board as a political power grab. Upon its creation, a majority of the board, four of the five members, had ties to the NPL. Only Nielson did not.

Totten, already a controversial figure because of his liberal views and libel lawsuits and openly branded a socialist by his opponents, was named chair of the board. He served as the board's chair until the summer of 1921. As chair, the controversies surrounding him continued:

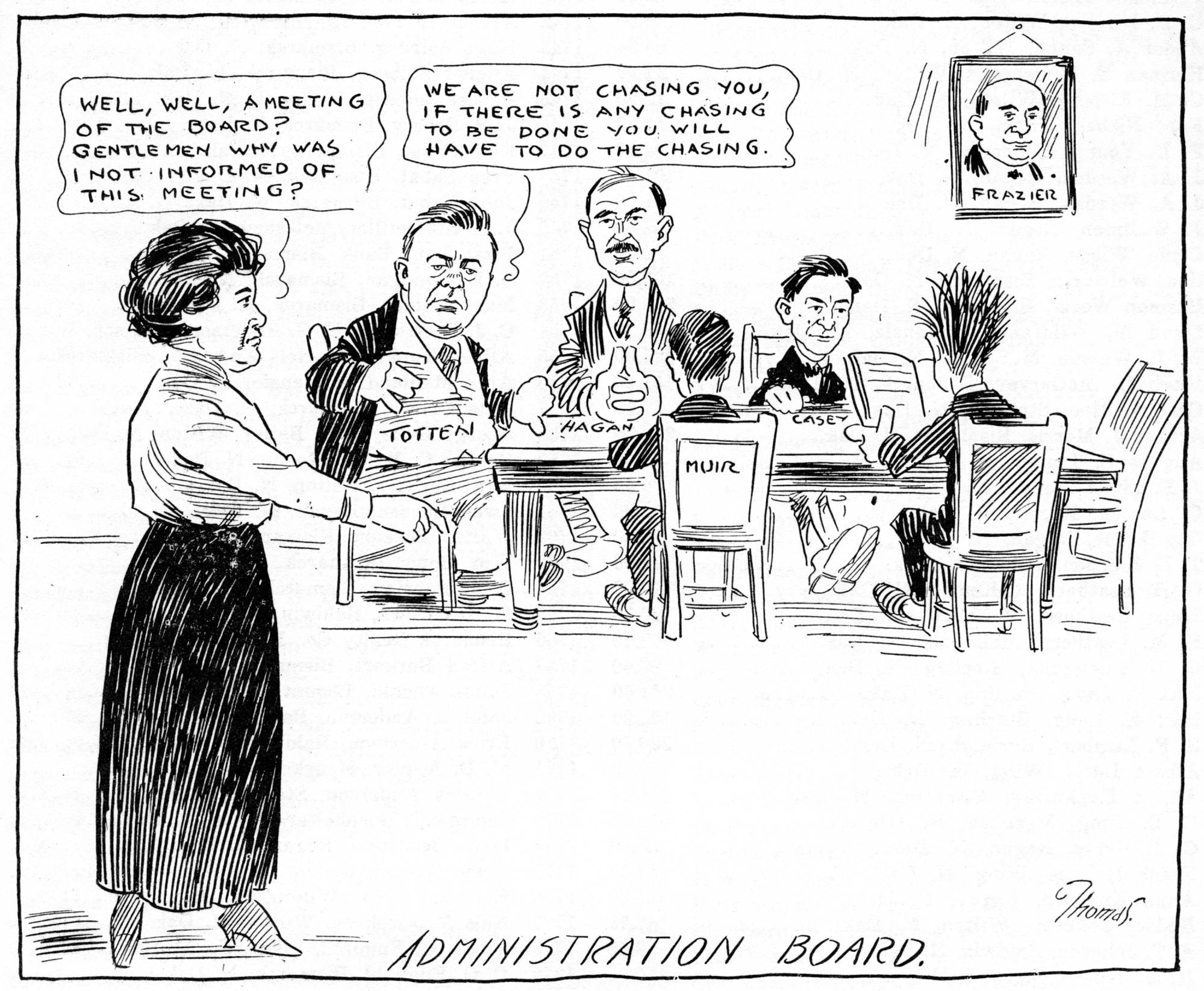
1920 cartoon from "The Red Flame" magazine portraying George A. Totten and the North Dakota Board of Administration excluding Minnie J. Nielson, Superintendent of Public Instruction, from meetings.

- The exclusion of Minnie Nielson, Superintendent of Public Instruction and the only non-NPL member of the board, from official meetings When Nielson protested the board meeting without her, Totten reportedly replied, "We're not going to chase after you every time there's a meeting. If you want to attend the meetings, you'll have to do the chasing."
- On November 1, 1919, the board's first annual report was submitted to the governor. In this report, the board included a recommendation to abolish the office of the state superintendent or make it a board-appointed position instead of an elected one. Nielson was not given a chance to see this report before it was published.
- The appointing of Neil C. Macdonald, the outgoing state superintendent and NPL member, to serve as an educational advisor and general school inspector with a salary equal to Nielson's
- The hiring of Charles Emil Stangeland to serve as a consultant to provide a review of the state library, which resulted in a number of books being added to the library's collections that were deemed provocative by the NPL's opponents
- The purchasing of a house in Fargo by the NPL's Home Building Association. The house, like many built by the Home Building Association for NPL members, had significant cost overruns. Totten and his son, George Jr., were both involved with this house.
- The attempt to remove Thomas F. Kane as the president of the University of North Dakota.

In October 1921, the NPL's opposition, the Independent Voters Association (IVA), struck a blow by initiating a special election that successfully recalled Lynn Frazier (Governor), William Lemke (Attorney General), and John N. Hagan (Commissioner of Agriculture and Labor). All three were prominent members of the NPL and served on the state's Industrial Commission.

In early February 1922, recently elected Governor R. A. Nestos, a member of the IVA, demanded Totten's resignation from the Board of Administration on charges of misconduct and incompetency. Initially, it was reported that Totten would refuse to quit, but he ultimately complied with the governor's request within two weeks.

== Later years ==
Totten later moved to Fargo and lived there for several years. He became an active minister again, serving parishes in Minnesota, including Graceville and Ortonville, until his retirement in the 1930s. Totten died in Minneapolis in 1955.

== Family ==
=== Wife ===
In 1890, Totten married Mary H. Bryne in Toronto, Canada. Their only living child was George A. Totten Jr.

=== Son ===
George A. Totten Jr., after serving as editor of the Bowman Citizen upon his father's resignation in the 1910s, also became involved with the NPL. In 1919, he served as the chief clerk for the North Dakota House.

He continued his work for the NPL, serving as a secretary for the organization and business manager of the Courier-News in Fargo, which was a newspaper backed by the NPL.

He became involved in the political infighting plaguing the NPL and was fired as business manager of the newspaper in July 1921. He was fired for his role in publishing a statement claiming NPL leaders in the state, especially state senator A. A. Liederbach, had squandered money intended for the fall 1921 recall election. Liederbach and his NPL followers, blaming the incident on disgruntled employees, confiscated 4,000 to 5,000 copies of the paper and burned them. They also took control of the newspaper. George Jr. and C. K. Gummerson were quickly fired, charged with libel, and arrested. George Jr. was also charged on a federal warrant alleging he transported liquor. The incident caused a scandal for the NPL, but a few days later, the issue was resolved. Gummerson and Totten retracted their statements, and the libel charges against them were dropped.

In addition to these troubles and the earlier troubles for the building of a house in Fargo by the NPL's Home Building Association, which had significant cost overruns, his troubles continued into 1922 because of his involvement with the Scandinavian American Bank in Fargo during his time as NPL secretary. The bank was owned by the NPL and had permanently closed in February 1921 because of insolvency.

George Jr. later moved to Minneapolis. He was elected treasurer of Hennepin County.

George Jr. died in Minneapolis in 1966, and he was buried in the catholic cemetery in Verona, North Dakota.

=== Brother ===
Edward Totten, the brother of George A. Totten Sr., was a prominent citizen of Bowman, moving to the town almost as soon as it was founded. He worked as a lawyer and editor of the Bowman Citizen. He served as the state's attorney for Bowman County, having been appointed by Governor John Burke. He later became a judge, having been appointed by Governor Frazier. He and his wife left Bowman in 1920 and moved to Alabama.

=== Sister-in-law ===
Back in the early 1900s, the clash between the Tottens and James E. Phelan in Bowman also extended to Lillian Totten, the wife of Edward Totten and the sister-in-law of George Totten Sr. By the mid to late 1910s, Phelan was losing his influence in local politics, largely because of the rise of the NPL. In 1916, Phelan had his own choice to serve as postmaster of Bowman, but Lillian Totten was awarded the job. Phelan used his remaining influence to attack the Tottens, especially Edward and Lillian, for their connection to Kate Richards O'Hare, activist and orator for the Socialist Party.

On July 17, 1917, while on an anti-war speaking tour across the country, O'Hare gave a lecture in Bowman. Nearly 150 people listened to her speech at the Cozy Theatre. The next day, Lillian dined with O'Hare.

O'Hare's lecture caused a stir among certain residents and plans against her were set in motion.

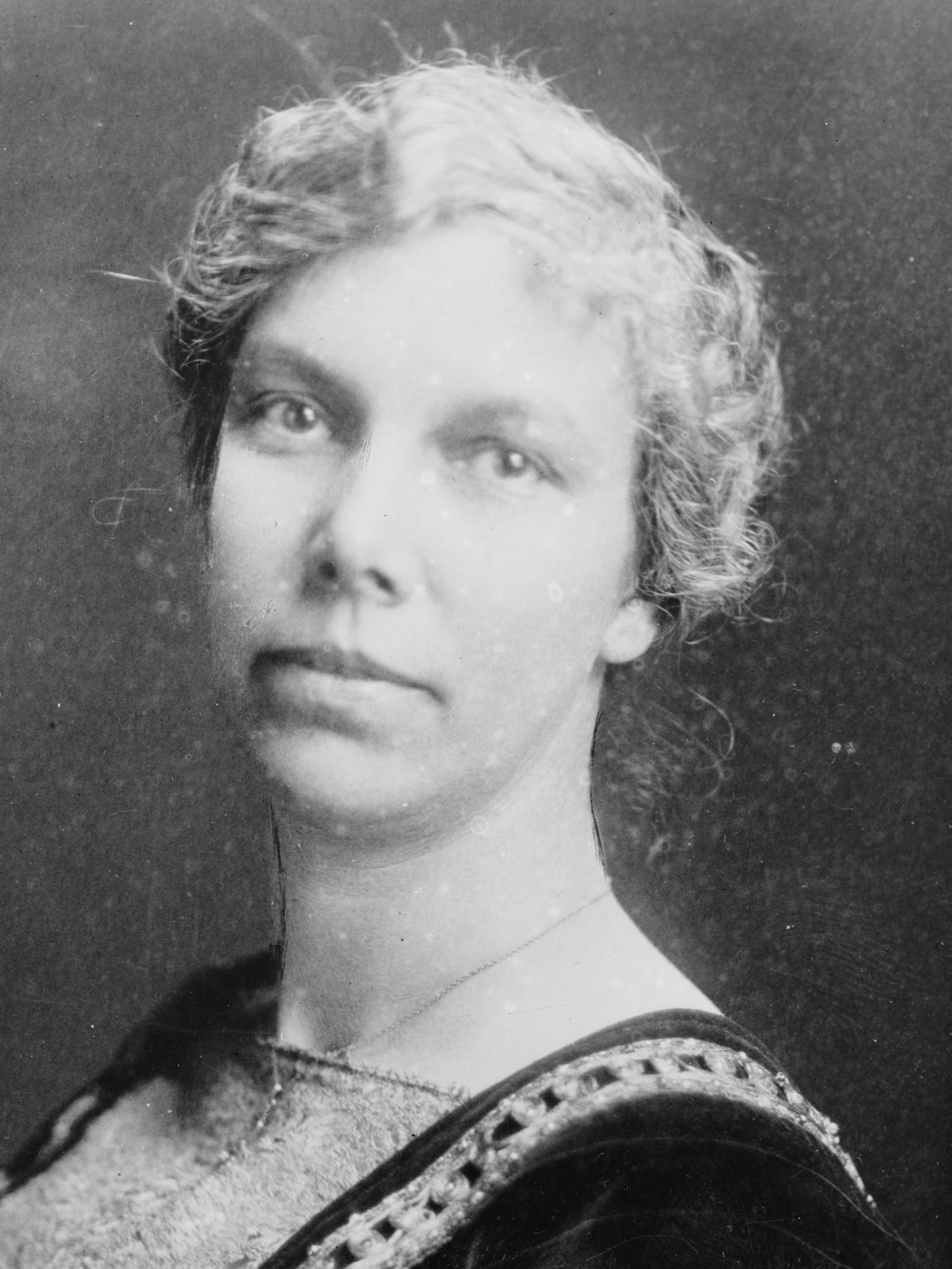
Kate Richards O'Hare in 1915

M. S. Byrne, a young sailor from the area who was working as a recruiter for the Navy, sent a telegram to the Minneapolis recruiting office reporting O'Hare had given a "highly unpatriotic" speech. The telegram was eventually forwarded to the Secretary of the Navy and then onto the U.S. Attorney General. The Attorney General's Office was already aware of O'Hare because, around this same time, the Insurance Federation of North Dakota had written to U.S. Senator Duncan Fletcher of Florida claiming Melvin A. Hildreth, North Dakota District Attorney, had refused to allow the state's attorney in Bowman County to arrest O'Hare.

At the same time, James E. Phelan wrote to his ally, U.S. Senator Porter J. McCumber of North Dakota. He pleaded for help to "suppress sedition and disloyalty toward the government." His letter, dated July 18, 1917, quoted some of O'Hare's speech, but it also indirectly put much blame on the Tottens. Phelan claimed in his letter that the "present postmistress" (Lillian Totten) had dined with O'hare, and she is planning to resign and the "frame up" is to have a "nephew of her husband appointed in her place" (referring to George A. Totten Jr.).

McCumber took to the floor of the Senate, and boldly stated there were "copperheads and traitors" in Bowman seeking to undermine the government. He also called on the Postmaster General to get the "traitors out of the post offices." The story and McCumber's speech appeared in newspapers across the country. Top NPL officials, Governor Lynn J. Frazier and Attorney General William Langer, defended the Tottens, claiming the charges from McCumber were purely political.

O'Hare continued on her tour in the state, stopping in Garrison and Devils Lake. Meanwhile, Phelan took to the courts, and a federal grand jury in Fargo indicted O'Hare. A bench warrant was issued and O'Hare was arrested by U. S. Deputy Marshal C. R. Wattles in Devils Lake before she could give her lecture. She appeared before Judge Charles F. Amidon, pleaded not guilty, and was released on bond.

The O'Hare case began in early December 1917 in Bismarck with Judge Martin Wade of Davenport, Iowa, presiding. After several witnesses, including the Tottens, testified over a couple of days, the jury found O'Hare guilty of violating the Espionage Act of 1917. She was sentenced to five years in the Missouri State Penitentiary in Jefferson City. A national campaign to secure her release ensued, which included the support from some Bowman residents and Gov. Frazier. O'Hare received a pardon in 1920.

Lillian Totten's career as postmaster of Bowman did not survive the scandal, and she and her husband moved to Alabama in 1920.
