= 1946 United States Senate election in North Dakota =

- November 5, 1946
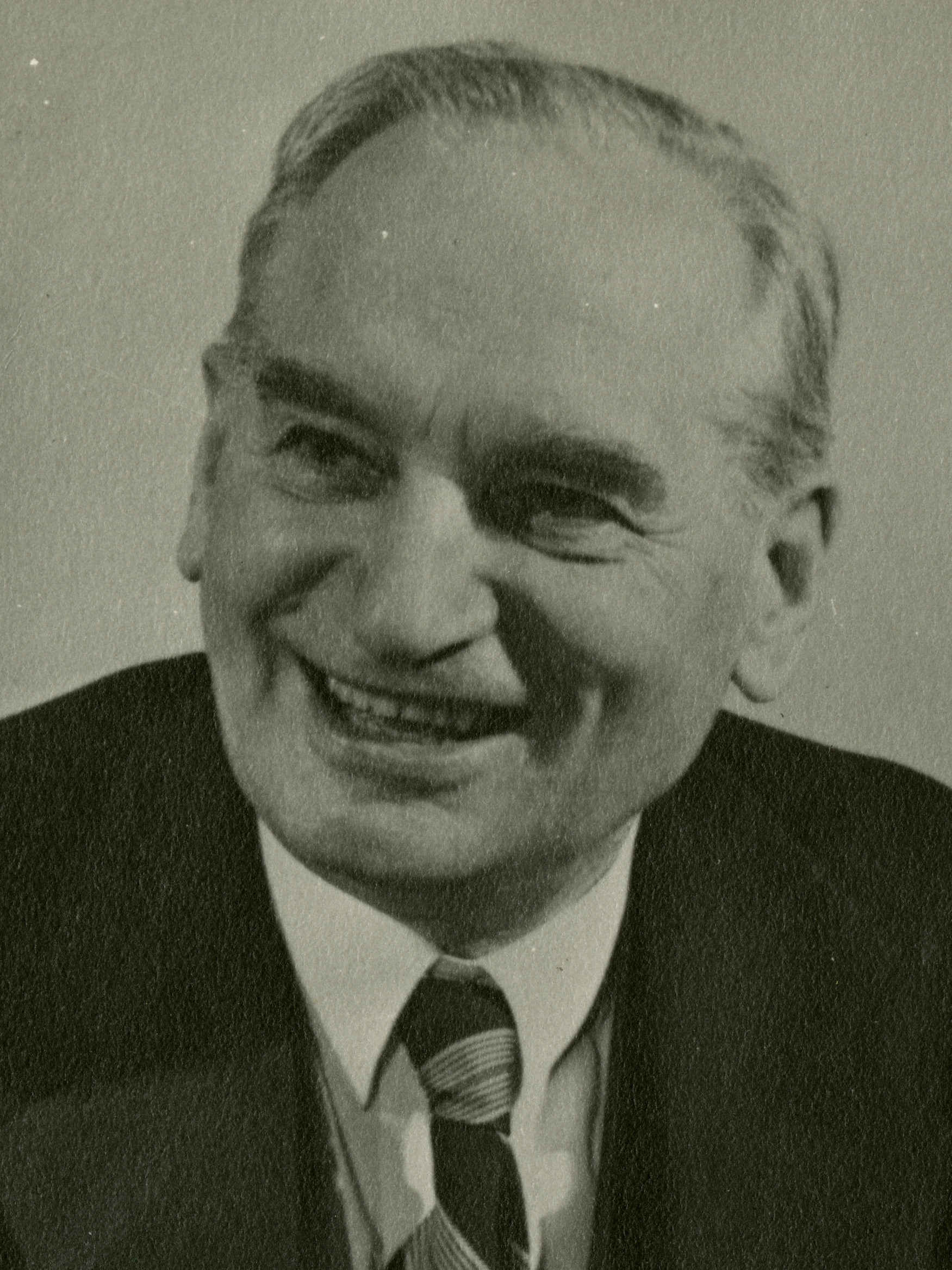

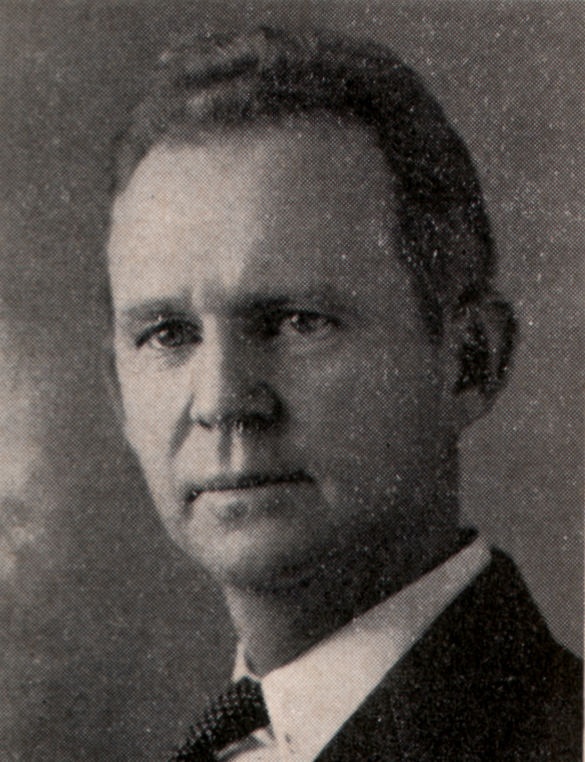

Nominee	William Langer	Arthur E. Thompson	Abner B. Larson
Party	Republican	Independent	Democratic
Popular vote	88,210	38,804	38,368
Percentage	53.34%	23.46%	23.20%
- County results Langer: 30–40% 40–50% 50–60% 60–70% 70–80%
U.S. senator before election
William Langer
Republican
Elected U.S. Senator
William Langer
Republican

The 1946 United States Senate election in North Dakota took place on November 5, 1946. Incumbent Republican Senator William Langer ran for re-election to a second term. Langer defeated State Senator Joseph Bridston in the Republican primary, who challenged Langer over his isolationist views. In the general election, he was opposed by Abner Larson, the Democratic nominee, and former State Superintendent of Public Instruction Arthur E. Thompson, who ran as an independent. Langer easily defeated both candidates and won re-election in a landslide.

== Democratic primary ==
=== Candidates ===
- Abner B. Larson

=== Results ===
Democratic primary results
Party	Candidate	Votes	%
Democratic	Abner B. Larson	14,270	100.00%
Total votes		14,270	100.00%

== Republican primary ==
=== Candidates ===
- William Langer, incumbent U.S. Senator
- Joseph R. Bridston, State Senator

=== Results ===
Republican primary results
Party	Candidate	Votes	%
Republican	William Langer (inc.)	67,449	55.72%
Republican	Joseph R. Bridston	53,607	44.28%
Total votes		121,056	100.00%

== General election ==
=== Results ===
1946 United States Senate election in North Dakota
Party	Candidate	Votes	%	±%
Republican	William Langer (inc.)	88,210	53.34%	+15.23%
Independent	Arthur E. Thompson	38,804	23.46%	—
Democratic	Abner B. Larson	38,368	23.20%	−3.25%
Majority		49,406	29.87%	+26.82%
Turnout		165,382		
Republican hold				
