= Charles Emil Stangeland =

American professor and economist

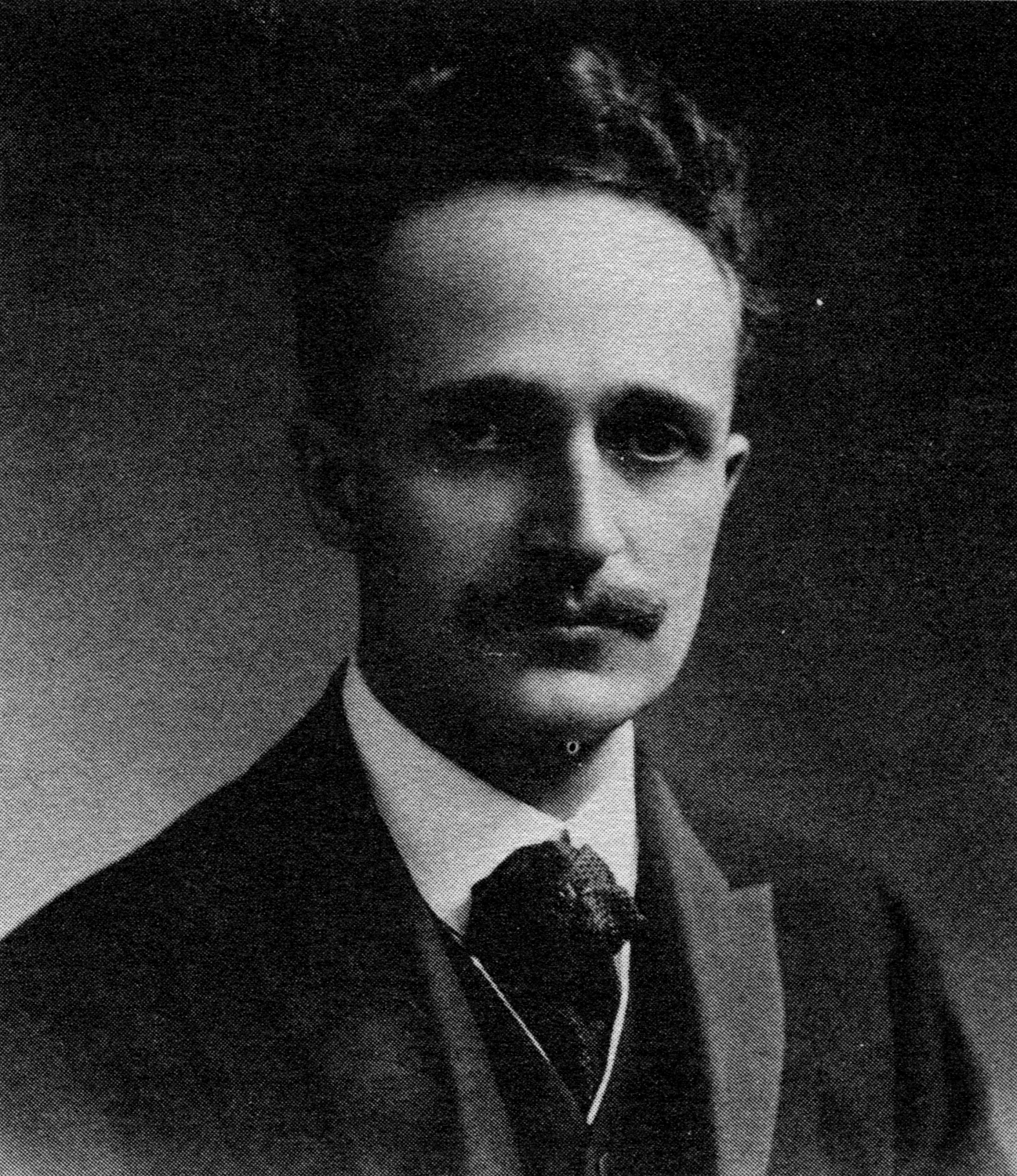
- Stangeland, circa 1915
- Born: 1881; Iowa, USA
- Died: 1942 (aged 60–61); Berlin, Germany
- Spouses: Karin Michaëlis (m. 1912; div. 1930) Emma Marie Gertrud Zeihfuss (m. 1940)

Academic background
- Education: University of Minnesota (BA); University of Berlin; Columbia University (PhD)

Academic work
- Institutions: Washington State College; University of Copenhagen; University of Berlin
- Notable works: Pre-Malthusian Doctrines of Population: A Study in the History of Economic Theory (1904)

Charles Emil Stangeland (1881–1942) was an American professor, diplomat, author, and economist. He served on the faculty at Washington State College in Pullman (1905–1909) and worked for the federal government as an accountant and diplomat (1909–1915), serving as an undersecretary for the U.S. Embassy in Bolivia and the Embassy in London. In 1919, he was recruited to North Dakota by the Nonpartisan League (NPL), working as an advisor for the newly formed State Board of Administration. He reviewed the state library, and his report and book recommendations helped create a political scandal for the NPL.

== Early years ==
Charles E. Stangeland was born in Iowa on May 1, 1881. He was the son of Norwegian immigrants Adolph (or Adolf) and Thera (or Thora) Stangeland.

=== Education ===
After attending schools in Iowa, Stangeland graduated from Augsburg Seminary in Minneapolis in 1898 and then attended the University of Wisconsin. He attended the University of Minnesota from 1900 to 1902, earning a degree and a teaching certificate. He then studied at the University of Berlin in Germany from 1902 to 1903. Stangeland was then accepted into a doctoral program at Columbia University and received a PhD in 1904.

== Career ==
=== Professor ===
After graduating from Columbia University, Stangeland became a professor of political economy at Washington State College in Pullman from 1905 to 1909. He started as an assistant professor but was promoted to full professorship in 1908.

During his time at Washington State College, Stangeland became a renowned scholar and intellectual. Between 1906 and 1919, he was repeatedly featured in Who's Who in America. In 1907, he received a leave of absence to study abroad. He traveled across Europe, including to France, Italy, and Russia.

=== Diplomat ===
By 1910, Stangeland had relocated across the country to Washington, D.C. The next few years were spent in the employ of the federal government, particularly in the diplomatic service. In 1912, he was named secretary of the legation in Bolivia and served in that role to 1913.

He then worked as a secretary at the U.S. embassy to the United Kingdom in London under ambassador Walter Hines Page. It was later rumored that Stangeland's career as a diplomat came to an abrupt end, between 1915 and 1918, because of his wife's alleged pro-German activities.

=== Statistician ===
By 1918, Stangeland was back in the United States and employed with the Bethlehem Shipbuilding Corporation as a statistician.

=== Arrest ===
While working as a statistician, in June 1918, Stangeland was arrested in Pennsylvania by federal authorities, after being indicted by a jury in New York on spy charges. Naval intelligence officers arrested Stangeland after he was accused of violating wartime espionage laws by passing information to the enemy. The letters were addressed to Stangeland's wife in Denmark and to author Ellen Key in Sweden. Stangeland did not use the postal service, but instead gave the letters to Gustav Ragnar Lindgren of the Swedish Army for delivery, who was set to leave for Europe. Lindgren was also arrested.

Stangeland denied any wrongdoing and said the letters were innocent. He was bailed out of jail by his friend, Dr. Charles A. Beard, author, historian, and former professor at Columbia. Within a few months, federal prosecutors dismissed the case against Stangeland.

== North Dakota ==
=== Nonpartisan League ===
By March 1919, Stangeland had been recruited by the Nonpartisan League (NPL), which was an organization that had risen to power politically in North Dakota. Initially, it was rumored that Stangeland would be involved with the newly formed Bank of North Dakota in Bismarck, or he would be named a professor at the University of North Dakota in Grand Forks.

Instead, Stangeland was installed as a consultant for the newly created Board of Administration. The Board of Administration was a state entity created by the NPL-controlled legislature in North Dakota during the regular session in early 1919. The Board of Administration consolidated three other boards and administered all penal institutions, charitable and educational institutions, and oversaw the public and common schools for the state. The Board of Administration also had authority over the state library.

The creation of the Board of Administration was controversial; even some state officials who were loyal to the NPL opposed it. Pro-NPL sources said its goal was efficiency and cost-saving. Anti-NPL sources said it was a political power grab.

=== Review of the state library ===
George A. Totten was largely responsible for the hiring of Stangeland. Totten, a controversial minister and newspaper publisher, was a strong supporter of the NPL. He served as the first chair of the Board of Administration and essentially ran it as he saw fit.

Stangeland's first duty for the Board of Administration was to thoroughly review the state library and provide a report on his findings. He began in September 1919 and completed his survey by the end of the month, but his report was not published until November when it was included within the first annual report of the Board of Administration.

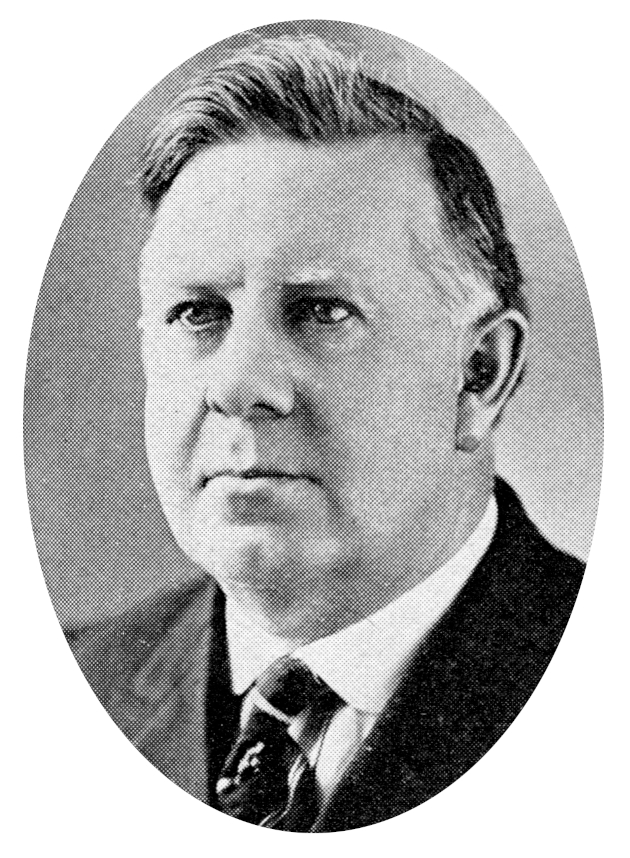
George A. Totten, Chair of the N.D. Board of Administration, circa 1919

In his report, Stangeland provided several criticisms of the state library. He said its collections were "poorly balanced." In the Educational Department, there were many novels of no authority, while books one would expect to find were lacking. The growing traveling library system had a "most deplorable lack of vision," and there was a "striking failure" to "satisfy real social needs."

To remedy these inadequacies, Stangeland recommended increased funding, and he said the state library needed to expand and diversify its collections. He provided a list of recommended items for the library to obtain and add to its collections, many of which were hardly controversial, such as The Atlantic, Literary Digest, National Geographic, Political Science Quarterly, and The Wall Street Journal. However, Stangeland also recommended items from "various nonconformist groups," such as single taxers, the I.W.W. (Industrial Workers of the World), anarchists, and socialists. It was this recommendation that would catch the eye of the NPL's opposition, particularly the Independent Voters Association (IVA).

Prior to Stangeland's review of the state library, in July 1919, Minnie Clarke Budlong submitted her resignation as State Librarian. She resigned for health reasons and moved to California to live closer to her daughter. Her resignation was accepted by the State Board of Regents, in one of its last acts before being replaced with the Board of Administration. After her resignation, other staff also left the library.

By October 1919, there were rumors that Stangeland was running the state library. Later, he would testify that he had never been a state library employee and was not in charge of it. But, he also admitted that there was a "time of uncertainty of the previous incumbent in the position in the library" and the arrival of the new librarian, and he had "supervision temporarily for the board of the library."

In the fall of 1919, the Board of Administration notified Stangeland that it had hired a new librarian. Anne E. Peterson, formerly of the New York Public Library, had been hired as "Deputy Librarian" (essentially State Librarian). Stangeland corresponded with Peterson and shared the findings from his review of the state library. She wrote back with suggested books to add to the collection ahead of her arrival, which had been delayed until November. She sent lists of books to Stangeland, who then ordered them. It was these books and their invoices that would help set the stage for a political scandal.

=== Book scandal ===
On November 25, 1919, the state legislature convened again for a special session. As legislators arrived at the State Capitol in Bismarck, they found copies of an invoice on their desks. The invoice contained a list of books to be ordered for the state library. Several of the books were controversial and appeared to relate to socialism, free love, and/or anarchism. The invoice had previously crossed the desk of Carl R. Kositzky, State Auditor. Kositzky, who had recently defected from the NPL and was now one of its most vocal opponents, was seemingly alarmed by the books because he made copies and distributed them to legislators.

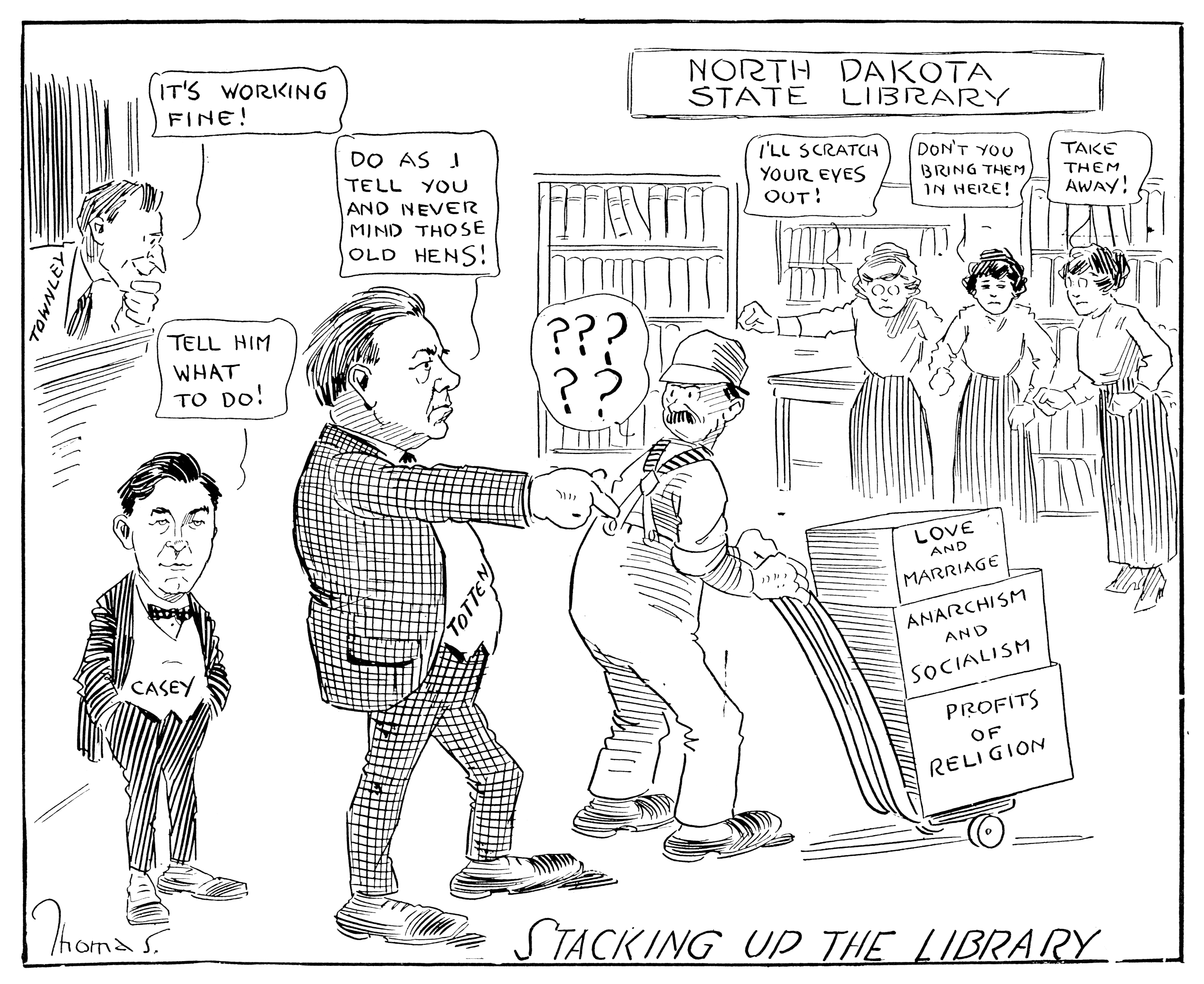
1920 cartoon from "The Red Flame" magazine depicting controversial books being inserted into the North Dakota State Library by Board of Administration members and A. C. Townley.

A few days later, on December 1, 1919, Rep. Olger B. Burtness, a member of the NPL's opposition, the IVA, gained the floor and spoke in support of a bill that would replace the controversial Board of Administration. He gave a sensational speech in the House claiming the state library had radical and controversial books in its collections that were ready to circulate to schools. He brought some of the books with him and read certain passages, focusing particular on Love and Ethics by Ellen Key. Burtness claimed the books were anti-marriage and encouraged free love, promoted disrespect for the country, and they were pro-anarchism.

Burtness pointedly placed the blame for these books on the NPL, the Board of Administration, and Stangeland, who he said had "buffeted from one jail to another" and was "telling our country schools what to read."

At this time, the NPL was facing increased accusations of socialism, and so the implication from Burtness and the IVA was clear: the NPL and the Board of Administration was attempting to indoctrinate schools and children with ideas of socialism, radicalism, free love, etc.

After the speech, reactions exploded across the front pages of newspapers, and public outcry was significant. Within hours after Burtness's speech, Governor Lynn J. Frazier requested that the Board of Administration remove Stangeland, but its members were split and no action was taken.

The House formed a five-person committee to investigate this book issue, three from the NPL and two from the IVA. Against the objections of the minority, the majority members of the committee obtained an attorney to handle the questioning of witnesses. Rep. J.F.T. O'Connor, a member of the committee and a lawyer himself, assumed the responsibility of questioning for the IVA minority. Burtness, Peterson and another librarian, Stangeland, and members of the Board of Administration were the key witnesses.

Most of the blame for the entire book incident fall on Stangeland. He was ultimately made a scapegoat and was dismissed from the Board of Administration's service. In his resignation letter, Stangeland wrote: "I believe the time will come when a clearer vision will make the controversy which has centered around me and my efforts in a different light, and that light will reveal the truth which the passions and fears of the day are making obscure."

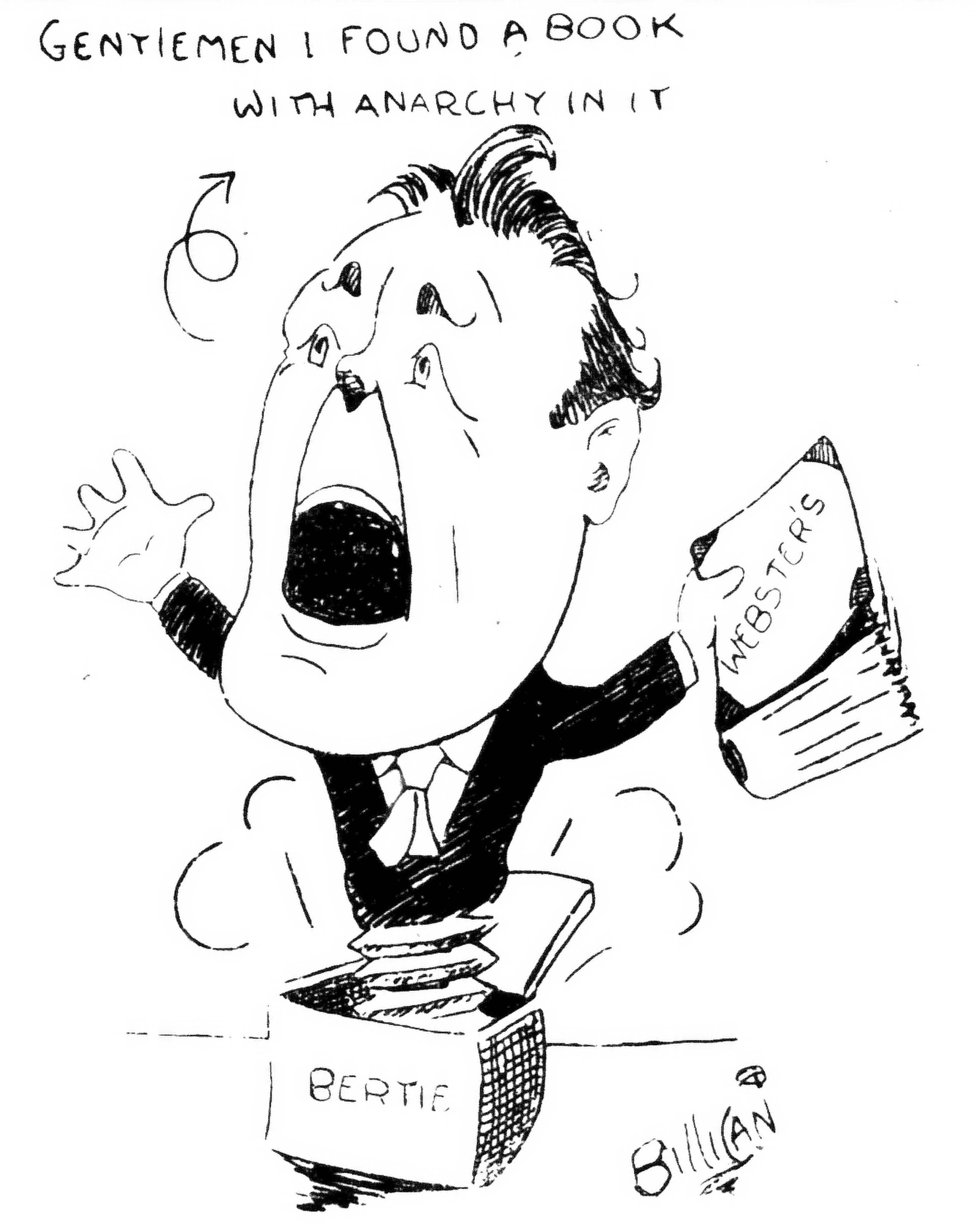
Pro-NPL cartoon from Billican (Wilfred Canan) depicting Rep. Burtness as a jack-in-the-box proclaiming he found a book with anarchy in it (a dictionary).

On December 10, 1919, the book investigation committee submitted its full report to the House. The committee concluded:

- Burtness had acted on rumors and his accusations were unfounded.
- The books in question where never intended for schools, and some of them had been in the library for several years.
- The Board of Administration and the state library were exonerated.

Not to be cheated out of their glory, Burtness and the IVA largely ignored the committee's report and continued to bring up the books in the months and years to come.

Additionally, after the report was submitted to the House, Burtness gained the floor and gave another lengthy speech. He defended his actions and further condemned the Board of Administration. He again read several excerpts from books. He then made another baseless claim that Stangeland and Neil C. Macdonald (former Superintendent of Public Instruction and current Educational Advisor and General School Inspector) had put controversial books into the library at the state penitentiary in an attempt to "instill poison into the minds of prisoners."

For Stangeland, his time in North Dakota had been short. Within a couple of months, he was reportedly living in Indiana. Pro-NPL sources had called him a scholar and diplomat. Anti-NPL publications referred to him as a criminal and radical. In his report on the state library, he described himself as "not a librarian but an educator and economist."

== Later years ==
By March 1921, Stangeland had left the country and was living in Europe. He served as a professor at the University of Copenhagen in Denmark and later became a lecturer at the University of Berlin in Germany

Stangeland died on October 20, 1942, in Berlin, Germany.

== Personal life ==
Stangeland was of Norwegian ancestry, being the son of Norwegian immigrants. In the 1910s, he was involved with the Norwegian Society in Washington, D.C. In January 1911, he was elected the chapter's secretary, and he gave a lecture about Bolivia to members in December 1915.

Stangeland was progressive and liberal in his political beliefs.

In 1912, in New York, Stangeland married Karin Michaëlis, a well-known Danish novelist. The two became estranged within a couple of years of their marriage, and they were reportedly separated by 1917 and divorced in 1930. In April 1940, Stangeland married Emma Marie Gertrud Zeihfuss in Berlin, Germany.

Arthur Stangeland, brother of Charles E. Stangeland, was a well-known attorney in Butte, Montana. Arthur died suddenly in 1922.

== Works and writings ==
- 1904 – Stangeland, Charles Emil, Pre-Malthusian Doctrines of Population: A Study in the History of Economic Theory.
- 1908 – Stangeland, Charles Emil, The Preliminaries to the Labor War in Colorado.
- 1919 – Stangeland, Charles E., A Brief Survey of the Public Library Commission of the State of North Dakota.
- 1924 – Stangeland, Charles E. The Scandinavian Countries Since the War.
- 1927 – Stangeland, Chas. E. (Translator). International price movements and the condition of agriculture in non-tropical countries.
