= George Totten =

George Totten may refer to:

- George A. Totten (1870–1955), American minister, publisher, and politician
- George M. Totten (1808–1884), American civil engineer
- George Oakley Totten Jr. (1866–1939), American architect
