= Emma F. Bates =

American politician

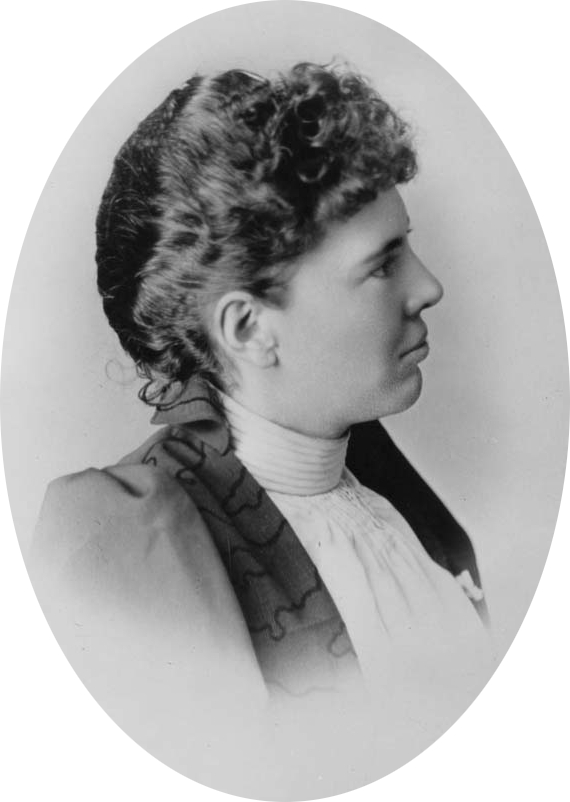

5th North Dakota Superintendent of Public Instruction
- In office 1895–1896
- Preceded by: Laura J. Eisenhuth
- Succeeded by: John G. Halland

Personal details
- Born: Emma F. Bates; Chautauqua, New York
- Died: 1921; California
- Political party: Republican

Emma F. Bates was an educator and politician from North Dakota. She served as the fifth North Dakota Superintendent of Public Instruction from 1895 to 1896.

== Biography ==
Emma F. Bates was born in Chautauqua, New York. She was the only child of Charles and Juliette Bates. She attended school at Forestville, New York, taking courses in elocution and oratory. After graduation, she worked as a private tutor before entering Allegheny College. Overwork brought on an illness which prevented her from completing college. When her health improved, she became the department head of elocution and literature at the Seminary of Western Pennsylvania in Clarion. Later, she was elected superintendent of schools in Erie County and served as a high school principal in Clarion.

In 1887, she moved to Dakota Territory and worked as an assistant to John Ogden at the Normal School in Milnor. In 1890, she ran for superintendent of schools for Sargent County but was defeated. In the early 1890s, she joined the faculty of the State Normal School in Valley City. In 1892, she served as interim president of the Valley City Normal School and served in that role for a few months until a new president was hired.

Bates was involved in several organizations in North Dakota. She lectured for the Women's Christian Temperance Union. She was also heavily involved with the Order of the King's Daughters and Sons, North Dakota Women's Suffrage Association, and the National Education Association.

Bates was described as intelligent, determined, deeply religious, and an accomplished public speaker. She received the nomination of North Dakota Superintendent of Public Instruction at the 1894 North Dakota Republican Convention in Grand Forks. Bates campaigned vigorously and defeated Democratic incumbent Laura J. Eisenhuth in the 1894 election. During her time as state superintendent, she visited numerous school across the state and traveled over 26,000 miles in the process.

Bates was defeated by John G. Halland for the nomination of state superintendent at the 1896 North Dakota Republican Convention in Grand Forks. She continued to pursue reelection and ran as an independent. However, John G. Halland won the election. It would be another twenty years before another women was elected state superintendent again.

After leaving office, she moved to California and studied Japanese. She lived in Japan for a year or two before moving back to California. She resided near Oakdale and died in 1921.

== See also ==
- List of North Dakota superintendents of public instruction
- North Dakota Department of Public Instruction

Political offices
Preceded by Laura J. Eisenhuth	North Dakota Superintendent of Public Instruction; 1895–1896	Succeeded by John G. Halland
