= Laura J. Eisenhuth =

American politician

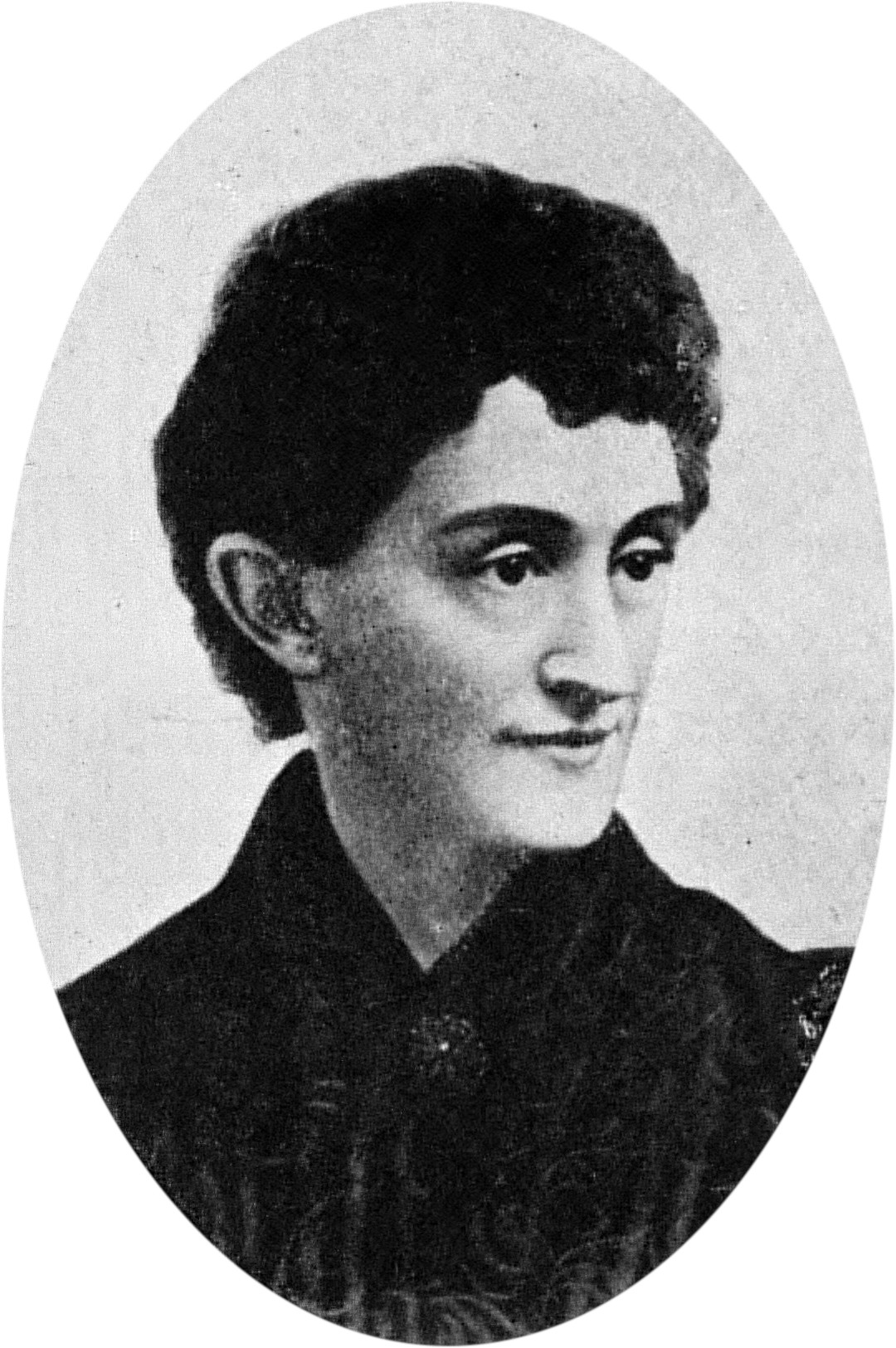

4th North Dakota Superintendent of Public Instruction
- In office 1893–1894
- Preceded by: John Ogden
- Succeeded by: Emma F. Bates

Personal details
- Born: Laura Kelly; May 29, 1859 Blenheim, Ontario
- Died: September 30, 1937 (aged 78) Medford, Oregon
- Spouse(s): Willis Eisenhuth, Ludwig Alming

Laura J. Kelly Eisenhuth (later Laura Kelly Alming) (May 29, 1859 – September 30, 1937) was an educator and politician from North Dakota. When she was elected the state's superintendent of public instruction in 1892, she became the first woman in the United States to win an election for state office.

== Early life ==
Laura J. Kelly was born in Blenheim, Canada West, to Thomas and Nancy (Flater) Kelly. With her parents she moved to DeWitt, Iowa, in either 1860 or 1863; there she grew up with four siblings. She attended college and then became a teacher at DeWitt High School in her hometown. She first traveled to the Dakota Territory in June 1885, filing a pre-emption claim on 160 acres of land near New Rockford. That fall she resumed teaching in Iowa, and returned to her homestead for each of the next two summers. She married, in the fall of 1887, Willis Eisenhuth, a drugstore owner from Carrington. He had come to the territory in 1882; like Laura, he had previously been a teacher in his hometown, Millheim, Pennsylvania. The couple would have no children.

== Educator ==
Not long after the couple's marriage and Laura's move to Carrington, she was asked, thanks to her eleven years' experience as an educator, to substitute for the local schoolteacher, who had resigned one month into the school year. She was meant to be a temporary substitute, but ended up serving out the year; at her return the next year she was provided an assistant. In 1889, she was elected superintendent of schools for Foster County, North Dakota, winning reelection the next year. In 1890, she received an appointment as a state institute conductor, overseeing operations for eight teacher institutes in northern North Dakota. That year the Democratic Party endorsed her to run for the position of North Dakota Superintendent of Public Instruction. Women in the state were only permitted to vote on matters involving schools, and this was the only statewide office for which they could vote; consequently, Eisenhuth reasoned, there was no reason she should not be eligible for the post. She lost, with 45% of the vote, and returned to her institute work, conducting workshops in the southern part of the state.

Laura J. Eisenhuth, North Dakota state superintendent of public instruction from 1893-94, was the first woman elected to statewide office in the U.S.

In 1892, Eisenhuth was endorsed once again by the Democratic Party for the state superintendent election, this time also picking up an endorsement from the Populist Party and from unaffiliated independents. Her opponent was Republican Joseph M. Devine, a well-respected educator from LaMoure who would go on to serve as lieutenant governor and governor. She won with a tally of 19,078 votes to Devine's 17,343. The election attracted national attention. Upon taking office in January, Eisenhuth's first action was to appoint a deputy, but her choice, W. R. Bierly, was turned down by governor Eli Shortridge. Instead, she nominated her husband, who was accepted to the post. The couple then purchased a home in Bismarck and became friends with the governor and his wife.

In her role as superintendent, Eisenhuth emphasized professional development, conducting many teacher training workshops herself. She recommended the installation of bath tubs in schools in towns with water systems, and was an advocate for fencing of school grounds. Her more ambitious goal, to build schools and improve others, was defeated by the Panic of 1893, which caused much trouble for the state economy. Furthermore, her husband became very ill in October, returning to Pennsylvania to recuperate; while he returned west sometime later, he spent much of his time in a hospital in Jamestown. Eisenhuth was defeated for reelection in 1894 by Emma F. Bates, the Republican candidate. Other women, however, soon followed her example in other western states; Antoinette Peavey was elected in Colorado the same year that Eisenhuth lost her post, and Estelle Reel won in Wyoming in 1896.

== Later life ==
Due largely to the health issues from which Willis was suffering, the couple suffered great financial hardships after Laura left office. They lost the newspaper which he had founded in Carrington, as well as the drugstore in that town and their home and possessions in Bismarck, due to unpaid county taxes. She ran for her old position in 1896 and 1900, but lost both races. Her husband died in May 1902, while she was serving as assistant principal of Carrington High School; she returned to teaching in Carrington that fall. She married Ludwig Alming in 1907, and moved with him to Jacksonville, Oregon, in 1909, where together they operated a fruit farm. She died in Medford, Oregon, where she is buried in Siskiyou Memorial Park. Willis is buried in Carrington. Neither her hometown newspaper nor that in Fargo, in their obituaries, was certain of the milestone she had reached.

== See also ==
- List of North Dakota superintendents of public instruction
- North Dakota Department of Public Instruction

Political offices
Preceded by John Ogden	North Dakota Superintendent of Public Instruction; 1893–1894	Succeeded by Emma F. Bates
