= Edwin J. Taylor =

American politician (1869–1956)

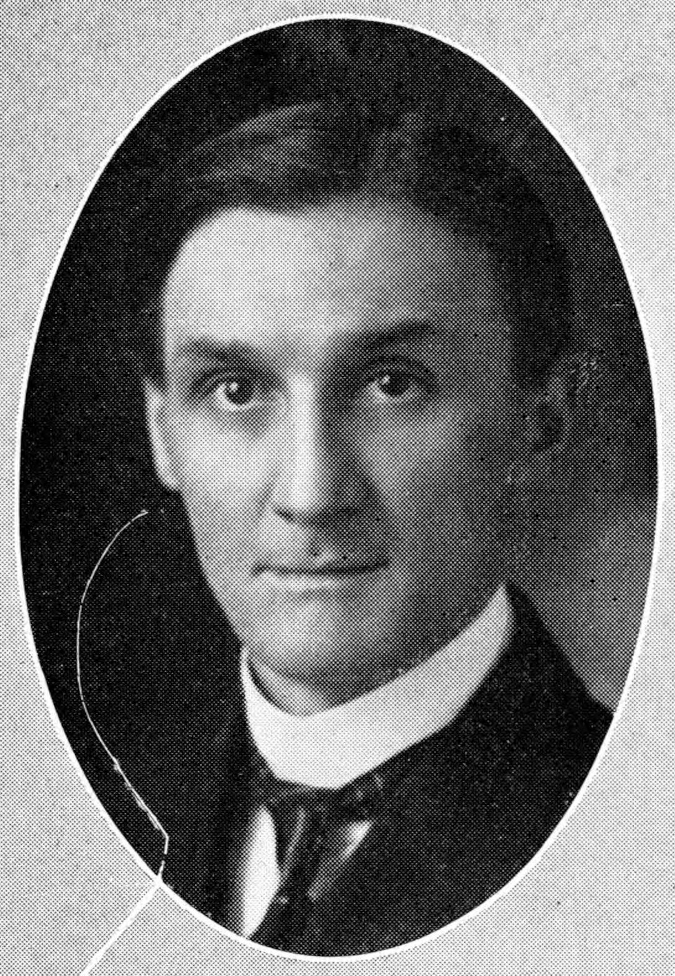

9th North Dakota Superintendent of Public Instruction
- In office 1911–1916
- Preceded by: Walter L. Stockwell
- Succeeded by: Neil C. Macdonald

Personal details
- Born: Edwin James Taylor; October 22, 1869; Waddington, New York, US
- Died: February 9, 1956 (aged 86); Bismarck, North Dakota, US

Edwin J. Taylor (October 22, 1869 – February 9, 1956) was a North Dakota public servant and politician with the Republican Party who served as the North Dakota Superintendent of Public Instruction from 1911 to 1916. After serving two terms, he did not seek re-election to the office in 1916.

== Biography ==
Edwin James Taylor was born in 1869 in Waddington, New York, where he grew up and was educated in the public schools. He graduated from St. Lawrence University in Canton, New York in 1890, and moved to Grand Forks later that year where he engaged in education. He was elected the Superintendent of Public Schools for his county in 1892, and held this position for three consecutive terms.

In 1903, he was appointed Deputy Superintendent of Public Instruction and served in this position for eight years. He won the office of North Dakota Superintendent of Public Instruction in 1910. He was re-elected in 1912 and 1914, but did not seek re-election in 1916.

Taylor later worked for many years as a law librarian and reporter for the North Dakota Supreme Court.

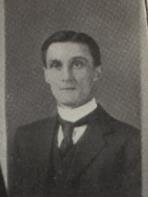
Edwin J. Taylor

He died at the age of 86 in 1956. He is buried at Memorial Park Cemetery in Grand Forks.

== See also ==
- List of North Dakota superintendents of public instruction
- North Dakota Superintendent of Public Instruction

Political offices
Preceded by Walter L. Stockwell	North Dakota Superintendent of Public Instruction; 1911–1916	Succeeded by Neil C. Macdonald
