= 1892 North Dakota Superintendent of Public Instruction election =

- November 8, 1892
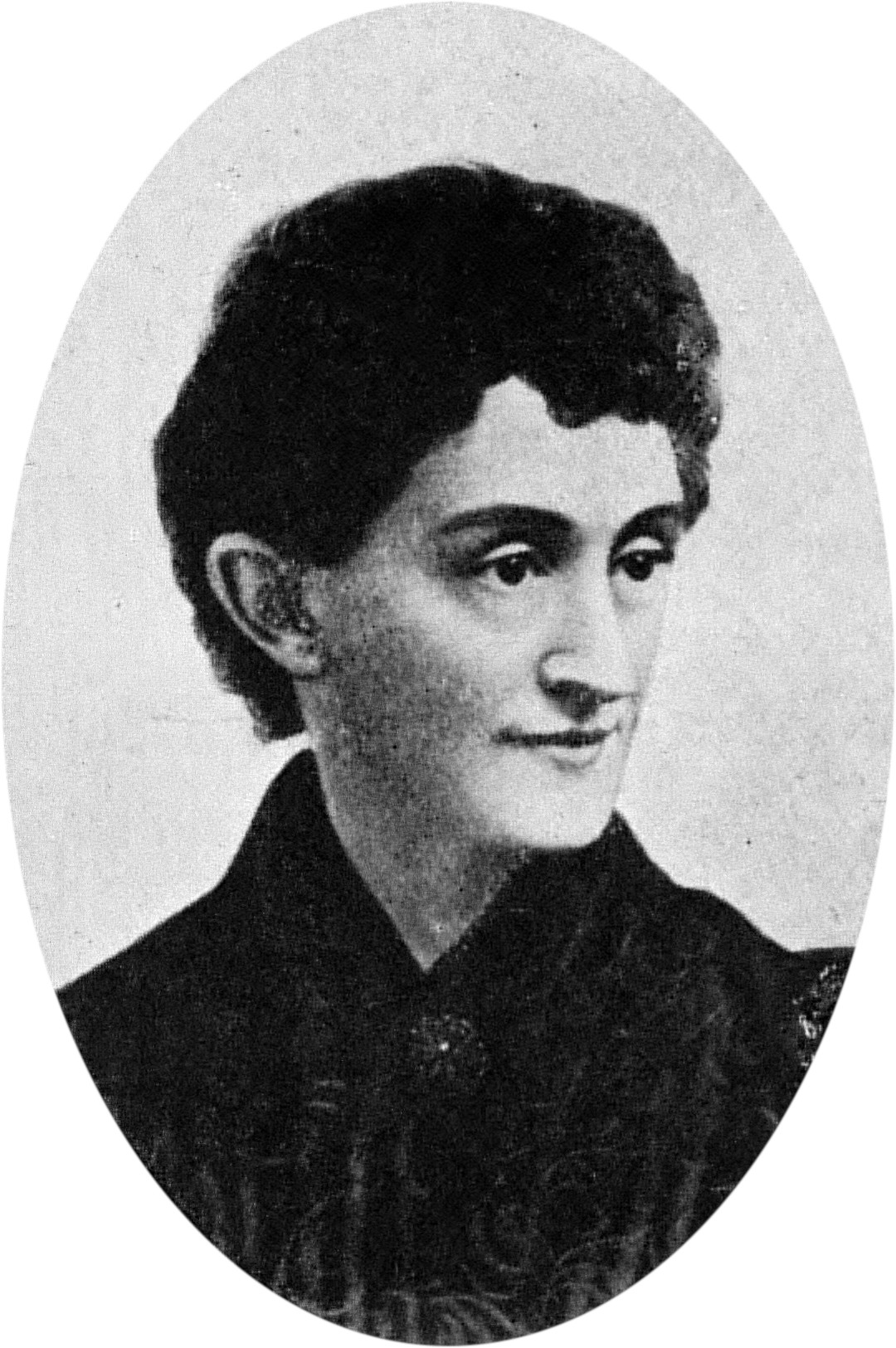

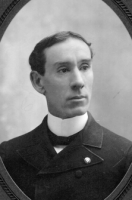
Nominee	Laura J. Eisenhuth	Joseph M. Devine
Party	Democratic-Independent	Republican
Popular vote	19,078	17,343
Percentage	52.38%	47.62%
Superintendent before election
John Ogden
Republican
Elected Superintendent
Laura J. Eisenhuth
Democratic-Independent

The 1892 North Dakota Superintendent of Public Instruction election was held on November 8, 1892, to elect the North Dakota Superintendent of Public Instruction. Republican incumbent John Ogden did not run for re-election. Democratic-Independent nominee and schoolteacher Laura J. Eisenhuth won the election, defeating Republican LaMoure County Superintendent of Schools Joseph M. Devine by four percentage points and becoming the first woman to be elected to a statewide position in the United States.

== General election ==
=== Candidates ===
- Laura J. Eisenhuth, schoolteacher and 1890 Democratic nominee for North Dakota Superintendent of Public Instruction (Democratic)
- Joseph M. Devine, LaMoure County Superintendent of Schools (Republican)

=== Results ===
1892 North Dakota Superintendent of Public Instruction election results
Party	Candidate	Votes	%
Democratic-Independent	Laura J. Eisenhuth	19,078	52.38%
Republican	Joseph M. Devine	17,343	47.62%
Total votes		36,421	100.00%
Democratic-Independent gain from Republican			
