= North Dakota Hymn =

- Regional anthem of North Dakota
- Lyrics: James William Foley, 1926
- Music: Clarence Simeon Putnam, 1927
- Published: 1927
- Adopted: 15 March 1947

Audio sample
- North Dakota Hymn: file; help

The "North Dakota Hymn" is the state song of the U.S. state of North Dakota. It was written by poet James Foley at the request of North Dakota Superintendent of Public Instruction Minnie Nielson in 1926 to the tune of "The Austrian Hymn". Dr. Clarence Simeon "C.S." Putnam arranged the music with distinct ragtime syncopation.

== Lyrics ==
North Dakota, North Dakota,
With thy prairies wide and free,
All thy sons and daughters love thee,
Fairest state from sea to sea;
North Dakota, North Dakota,
Here we pledge ourselves to thee.

Hear thy loyal children singing,
Songs of happiness and praise,
Far and long the echoes ringing,
Through the vastness of thy ways;
North Dakota, North Dakota,
We will serve thee all our days.

Onward, onward, onward going,
Light of courage in thine eyes,
Sweet the winds above thee blowing,
Green thy fields and fair thy skies;
North Dakota, North Dakota,
Brave the Soul that in thee lies.

God of freedom, all victorious,
Give us Souls serene and strong,
Strength to make the future glorious,
Keep the echo of our song;
North Dakota, North Dakota,
In our hearts forever long.
