= Arthur E. Thompson =

American politician and teacher

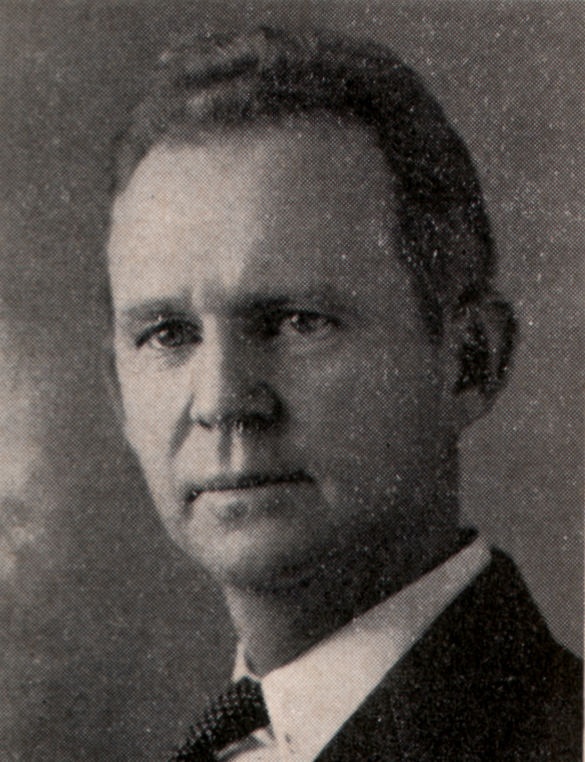
Arthur E. Thompson

Arthur Edwin Thompson (September 19, 1891 – September 21, 1969) was a North Dakota politician and teacher who served as the North Dakota Superintendent of Public Instruction from 1933 to 1946.

== Biography ==
Arthur Thompson was born in Milan, Minnesota in 1891; his father was a harness maker. He graduated from St. Olaf College in Northfield, Minnesota in 1915 with a B.A. degree. During 1920 and 1921 he took summer school from the University of Minnesota. He married Emma Silverson, also of Milan, in 1921. They had four children; three boys and one girl. He served as the Principal of the High School in Tyler, Minnesota from 1915 to 1916, as the superintendent of schools for Washburn, North Dakota from 1916 to 1917, and in the U.S. Army during World War I from 1917 to 1919. During his service of 22 months, he spent 18 months fighting overseas. Upon his return, he went back to his post as the Washburn School Superintendent, and served in that position until 1922. He then served as the County Superintendent of Schools for McLean County from 1923 to 1931. In 1932 he was elected as the North Dakota Superintendent of Public Instruction; he served in that position until he resigned on August 31, 1946. He died in 1969 in Minnesota.

== Notes ==
Political offices
Preceded by Bertha R. Palmer	North Dakota Superintendent of Public Instruction; 1933–1946	Succeeded by Garfield B. Nordrum
