= North Dakota Vision Services/School for the Blind =

Public school in North Dakota, United States

Coordinates: 47°55′29″N 97°04′51″W

North Dakota School for the Blind
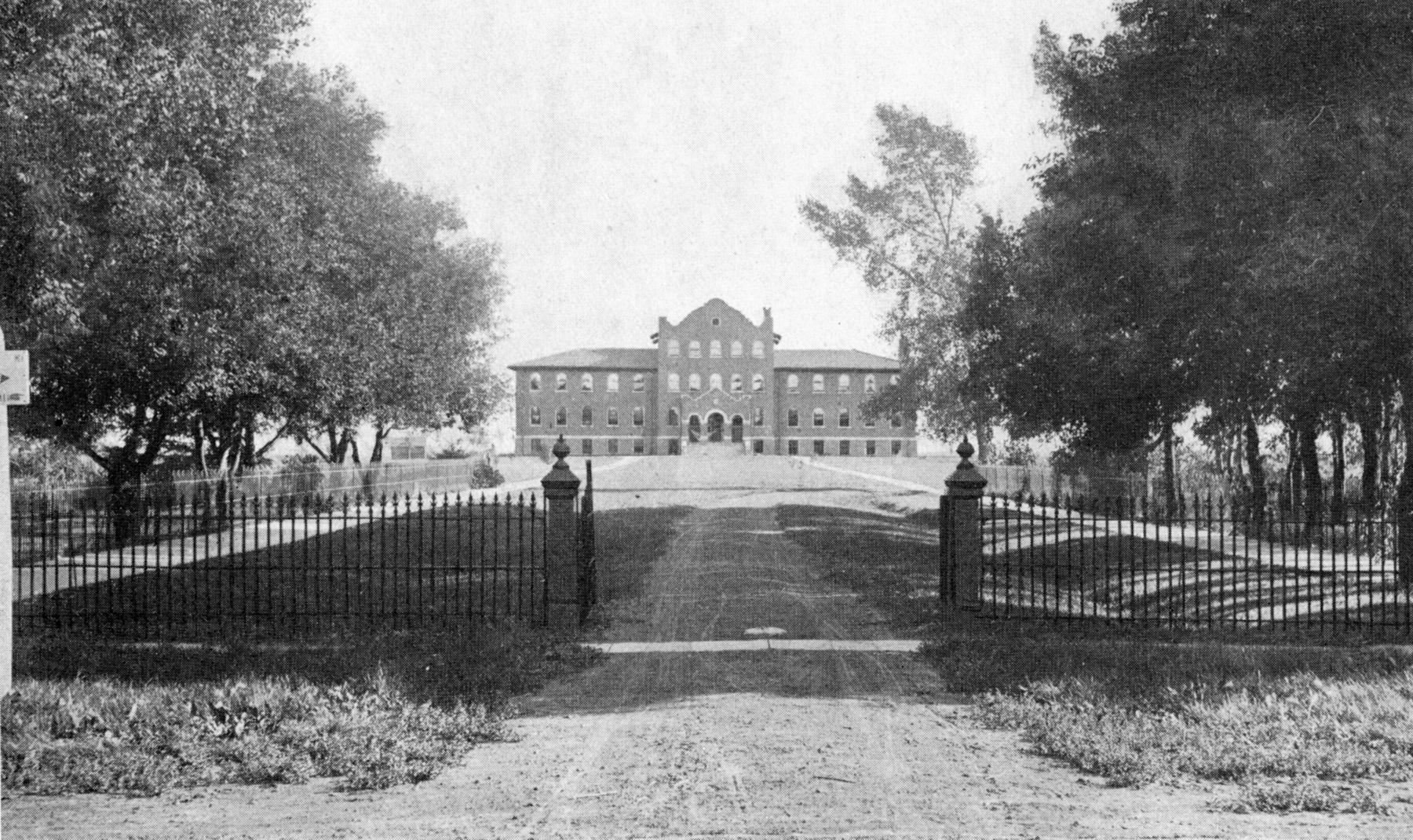
- Entrance to the North Dakota School for the Blind in Bathgate, circa 1914
- 500 Stanford Road, Grand Forks, ND 58203-2799

Information
- Type: Public school
- Established: 1908
- Head of school: Paul Olson
- Grades: K–12 (provides service to all ages)
- Website: www.ndvisionservices.com

North Dakota Vision Services/School for the Blind (NDVS/SB, Braille: ⠝⠙⠧⠎⠎⠃) is a branch of the North Dakota government offering services to visually impaired residents of all ages in North Dakota. It is centered in Grand Forks, with regional offices in Bismarck, Fargo, Jamestown, and Minot.

The institution was founded in 1908 as the North Dakota School for the Blind (NDSB) in Bathgate. It moved to its current location in Grand Forks in 1961. NDSB became a division of the North Dakota Department of Public Instruction in 1991. The North Dakota Legislative Assembly officially changed the name to North Dakota Vision Services/School for the Blind in 2001.

== Campus ==
The current Grand Forks campus has a dormitory that was renovated in 1995.
