= List of North Dakota superintendents of public instruction =

This is a list of North Dakota superintendents of public instruction. The office was on a party-affiliated ballot until the year 1913, since then it has been on the no party ballot, although most superintendents have had some association with one party or another. The superintendent served a two-year term office until 1964. Since then, they have been elected to four-year terms.

#	Name	Term	Party
1	William Mitchell	1889–1890	Republican
2	William J. Clapp	1890	Republican
3	John Ogden	1891–1892	Republican
4	Laura J. Eisenhuth	1893–1894	Democratic-Independent
5	Emma F. Bates	1895–1896	Republican
6	John G. Halland	1897–1900	Republican
7	Joseph M. Devine	1901–1902	Republican
8	Walter L. Stockwell	1903–1910	Republican
9	Edwin J. Taylor	1911–1916	Republican
10	Neil C. Macdonald	1917–1918	Nonpartisan (Republican/NPL)
11	Minnie J. Nielson	1919–1926	Nonpartisan (Republican/IVA)
12	Bertha R. Palmer	1927–1932	Nonpartisan
13	Arthur E. Thompson	1933–1946	Nonpartisan
14	Garfield B. Nordrum	1946–1951	Nonpartisan
15	Marvell F. Peterson	1951–1976	Nonpartisan
16	Howard Snortland	1977–1980	Nonpartisan
17	Joseph Crawford	1981–1984	Nonpartisan
18	Wayne G. Sanstead	1985–2013	Nonpartisan (Democratic-NPL)
19	Kirsten Baesler	2013–2025	Nonpartisan (Republican)
20	Levi Bachmeier	2025–	Nonpartisan (Republican)

== See also ==
- North Dakota Superintendent of Public Instruction
