= North Dakota Department of Public Instruction =

The North Dakota Department of Public Instruction (NDDPI), led by Levi Bachmeier, oversees the public school system in the U.S. state of North Dakota. The DPI also oversees the North Dakota State Library, the North Dakota School for the Blind, and the North Dakota School for the Deaf. The DPI is headed by the North Dakota Superintendent of Public Instruction. The DPI is headquartered in Bismarck.

== See also ==
- List of North Dakota superintendents of public instruction
