= North Dakota State Library =

Coordinates: 46°49′09″N 100°46′53″W

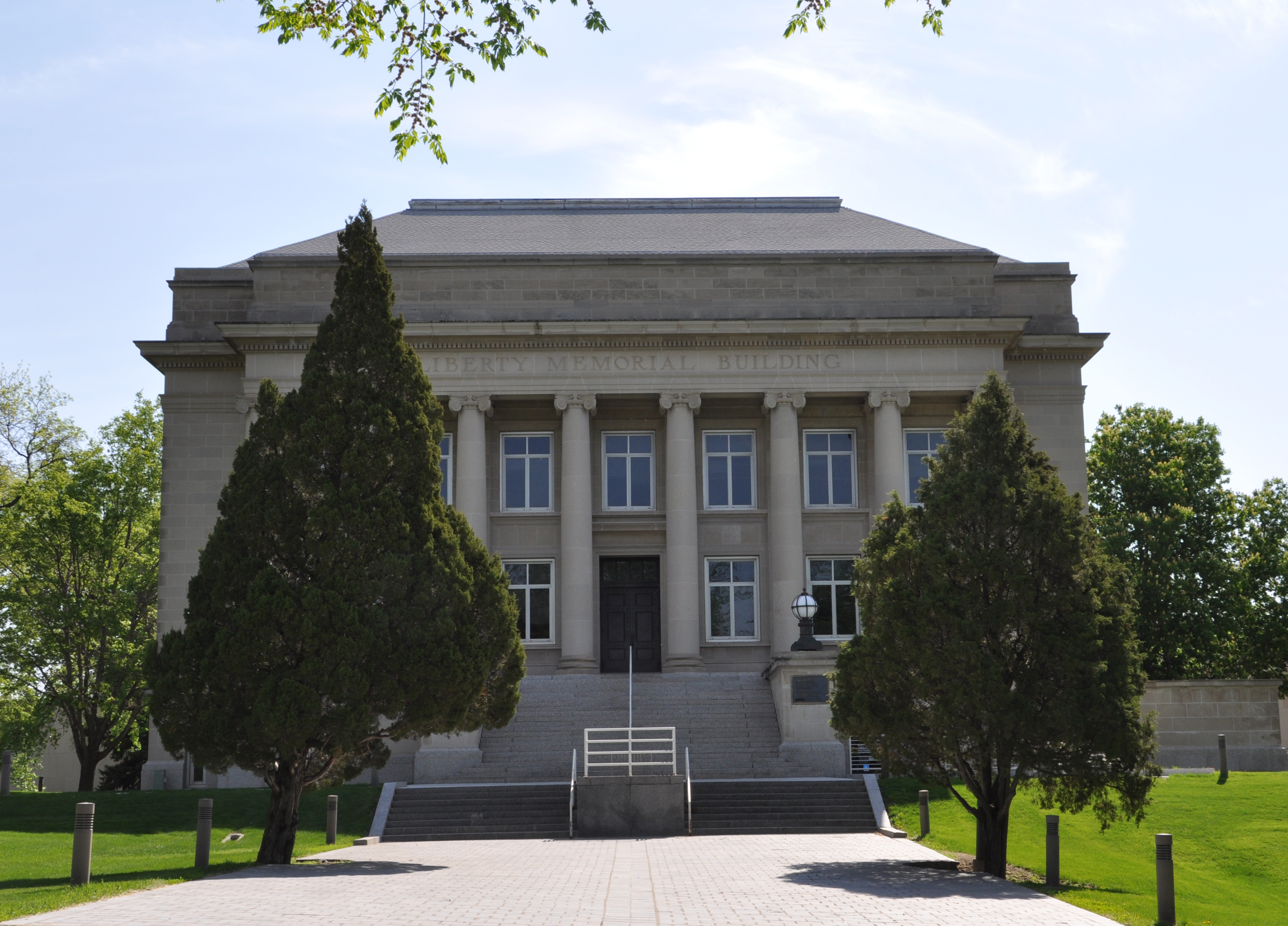
North Dakota State Library

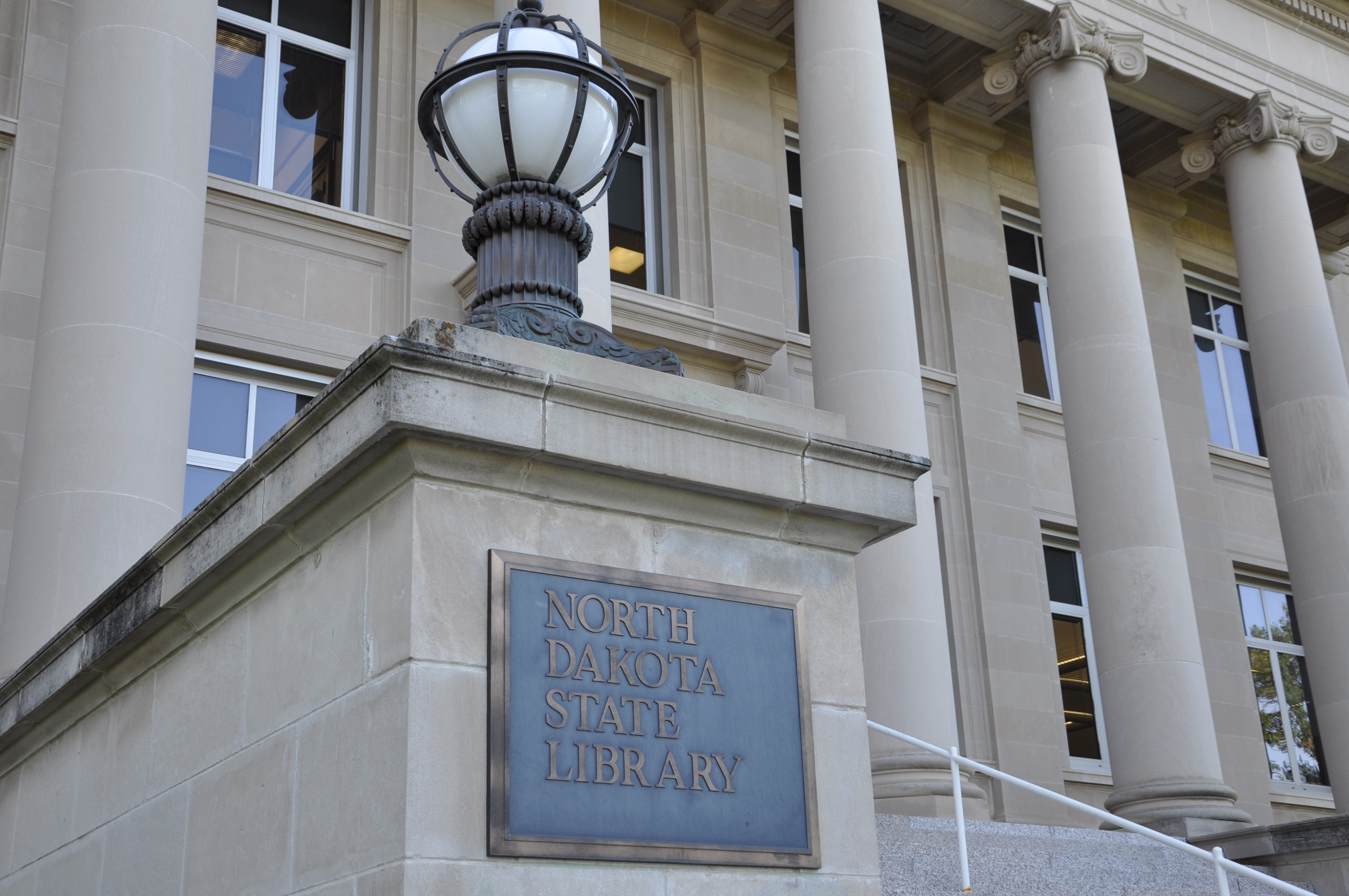
North Dakota State Library

The North Dakota State Library is a government-operated library in the U.S. state of North Dakota. Located in the state's capital city of Bismarck on the capital grounds, the library has been in operation since 1907. The State Library is a division of the North Dakota Department of Public Instruction.

== History ==
The State Library was established as the Public Library Commission in 1907, and it occupied a single room in the North Dakota State Capitol building. In 1909, the library's name was changed to the State Library Commission. In 1936, the library moved to the Liberty Memorial Building on the Capitol Grounds, which is where it remained until 1970. At that point, the library moved this time to the Randal Building north of the city. The agency's name was changed to the North Dakota State Library in 1979, which is still its name today. In 1982, the State Library returned to the Liberty Memorial Building, its present location.

== State Librarians ==
- Mary J. Soucie, 2014–present
- Hulen E. Bivins, 2010–2013
- Doris A. Ott, 2001–2010
- Joseph C. Linnertz (acting director), 2000–2001
- Mike Jaugstetter, 1996–2000
- Joseph C. Linnertz (acting director), 1995–1996
- William R. Strader, 1991–1993
- Patricia L. Harris, 1985–1991
- Margaret M. Stefanak, 1983–1985
- Ruth E. Mahan, 1981–1983
- Richard J. Wolfert, 1969–1981
- Leone Morrison (acting director), 1968–1969
- Freda W. Hatten, 1964–1968
- Hazel Webster Byrnes, 1948–1964
- Lillian E. Cook, 1922–1948
- Mary E. Downey, 1921–1923
- S. Blanche Hedrick, 1919–1921
- Minnie Clarke Budlong, 1909–1919
- Zana K. Miller, 1907–1908

== Function ==
The State Library specializes in information services to state agencies and to the general public.

== Departments ==
The North Dakota State Library has four divisions: Administrative Services, Technology Services, Patron Services, and Library Services. The departments under these divisions include: Administration, Cataloging, Circulation, Digital Initiatives, Information Technology, Interlibrary Loan, Library Development, Public Information, Reference, and Talking Books.

== Publications ==
North Dakota State Library staff produce publications on Library Vision, State Library services, handbooks for North Dakota public library board members, copyright, interlibrary loan, North Dakota library law, search warrants, and North Dakota public library statistics. These publications include:

- Brochures
- Flyers
- Handbooks & Manuals
- Library Directories
- Reports

== See also ==
- List of libraries in the United States
