= North Dakota Superintendent of Public Instruction =

North Dakota State Educational Supervisor

Superintendent of Public Instruction of North Dakota
- Incumbent; Levi Bachmeier since November 24, 2025
- North Dakota Department of Public Instruction
- Term length: 4 years
- Formation: 1889
- First holder: William Mitchell
- Website: www.nd.gov/dpi/about/superintendent/

The North Dakota superintendent of public instruction oversees the operations of the North Dakota Department of Public Instruction. The superintendent enforces state and federal statutes and regulations regarding public schools and related programs within the U.S. state of North Dakota. The superintendent also oversees the North Dakota State Library, the North Dakota School for the Blind, and the North Dakota School for the Deaf. The superintendent of public instruction is elected by statewide vote on a no party ballot. However, the superintendent usually associates with one party or another.

Before it became a nonpartisan position in 1917, all superintendents except for one, Laura J. Eisenhuth, were Republicans. Eisenhuth was also the first woman elected to statewide office in the United States.

== See also ==
- List of North Dakota superintendents of public instruction
