= List of justices of the North Dakota Supreme Court =

The following is a list of the North Dakota Supreme Court justices, split into their respective courts.

== North Dakota Supreme Court justices ==
| Court | Justice | | | | |
| Court | 1 | 2 | 3 | 4 | 5 |
|---|---|---|---|---|---|
| 1st (1889–1898) | Guy C. H. Corliss | Joseph Bartholomew | Alfred Wallin | | |
| 2nd (1898–1900) | Newton C. Young | Joseph Bartholomew | Alfred Wallin | | |
| 3rd (1901–1902) | Newton C. Young | David Morgan | Alfred Wallin | | |
| 4th (1903–1904) | Newton C. Young | David Morgan | John M. Cochrane | | |
| 5th (1904–1906) | Newton C. Young | David Morgan | Edward Engerud | | |
| 6th (1906) | John Knauf | David Morgan | Edward Engerud | | |
| 7th (1907) | Charles Joseph Fisk | David Morgan | Edward Engerud | | |
| 8th (1907–1909) | Charles Joseph Fisk | David Morgan | Burleigh F. Spalding | | |
| 9th (1909–1910) | Charles Joseph Fisk | David Morgan | Burleigh F. Spalding | Sidney E. Ellsworth | John Carmody |
| 10th (1911) | Charles Joseph Fisk | David Morgan | Burleigh F. Spalding | Evan B. Goss | Edward T. Burke |
| 11th (1911–1914) | Charles Joseph Fisk | Andrew A. Bruce | Burleigh F. Spalding | Evan B. Goss | Edward T. Burke |
| 12th (1915–1916) | Charles Joseph Fisk | Andrew A. Bruce | Adolph M. Christianson | Evan B. Goss | Edward T. Burke |
| 13th (1917–1918) | Charles Joseph Fisk | Andrew A. Bruce | Adolph M. Christianson | Richard Grace | James Robinson |
| 14th (1918–1922) | Luther E. Birdzell | Harrison A. Bronson | Adolph M. Christianson | Richard Grace | James Robinson |
| 15th (1923–1924) | Luther E. Birdzell | Harrison A. Bronson | Adolph M. Christianson | William Nuessle | Sveinbjorn Johnson |
| 16th (1925–1926) | Luther E. Birdzell | John Burke | Adolph M. Christianson | William Nuessle | Sveinbjorn Johnson |
| 17th (1926–1933) | Luther E. Birdzell | John Burke | Adolph M. Christianson | William Nuessle | Alexander Burr |
| 18th (1933–1934) | George Moellring | John Burke | Adolph M. Christianson | William Nuessle | Alexander Burr |
| 19th (1935–1937) | James Morris | John Burke | Adolph M. Christianson | William Nuessle | Alexander Burr |
| 20th (1937–1938) | James Morris | Peter O. Sathre | Adolph M. Christianson | William Nuessle | Alexander Burr |
| 21st (1939–1949) | James Morris | Thomas J. Burke | Adolph M. Christianson | William Nuessle | Alexander Burr |
| 22nd (1949–1950) | James Morris | Thomas J. Burke | Adolph M. Christianson | William Nuessle | Gudmunder Grimson |
| 23rd (1951–1954) | James Morris | Thomas J. Burke | Adolph M. Christianson | Gudmunder Grimson | Peter O. Sathre |
| 24th (1954–1958) | James Morris | Thomas J. Burke | Nels Johnson | Gudmunder Grimson | Peter O. Sathre |
| 25th (1959–1962) | James Morris | Thomas J. Burke | Alvin C. Strutz | Obert C. Teigen | Peter O. Sathre |
| 26th (1963–1964) | James Morris | Thomas J. Burke | Alvin C. Strutz | Obert C. Teigen | Ralph J. Erickstad |
| 27th (1965–1966) | Harvey B. Knudson | Thomas J. Burke | Alvin C. Strutz | Obert C. Teigen | Ralph J. Erickstad |
| 28th (1966) | Harvey B. Knudson | William S. Murray | Alvin C. Strutz | Obert C. Teigen | Ralph J. Erickstad |
| 29th (1967–1973) | Harvey B. Knudson | William Paulson | Alvin C. Strutz | Obert C. Teigen | Ralph J. Erickstad |
| 30th (1973–1974) | Harvey B. Knudson | William Paulson | Robert Vogel | Obert C. Teigen | Ralph J. Erickstad |
| 31st (1974–1975) | Harvey B. Knudson | William Paulson | Robert Vogel | J. Philip Johnson | Ralph J. Erickstad |
| 32nd (1975–1978) | Vernon R. Pederson | William Paulson | Robert Vogel | Paul M. Sand | Ralph J. Erickstad |
| 33rd (1978–1983) | Vernon R. Pederson | William Paulson | Gerald W. VandeWalle | Paul M. Sand | Ralph J. Erickstad |
| 34th (1983–1984) | Vernon R. Pederson | H. F. Gierke III | Gerald W. VandeWalle | Paul M. Sand | Ralph J. Erickstad |
| 35th (1985–1991) | Beryl J. Levine | H. F. Gierke III | Gerald W. VandeWalle | Herbert L. Meschke | Ralph J. Erickstad |
| 36th (1992) | Beryl J. Levine | J. Philip Johnson | Gerald W. VandeWalle | Herbert L. Meschke | Ralph J. Erickstad |
| 37th (1993–1996) | Beryl J. Levine | Dale V. Sandstrom | Gerald W. VandeWalle | Herbert L. Meschke | William A. Neumann |
| 38th (1996–1998) | Mary Muehlen Maring | Dale V. Sandstrom | Gerald W. VandeWalle | Herbert L. Meschke | William A. Neumann |
| 39th (1998–2005) | Mary Muehlen Maring | Dale V. Sandstrom | Gerald W. VandeWalle | Carol Ronning Kapsner | William A. Neumann |
| 40th (2005–2013) | Mary Muehlen Maring | Dale V. Sandstrom | Gerald W. VandeWalle | Carol Ronning Kapsner | Daniel J. Crothers |
| 41st (2014–2016) | Lisa K. Fair McEvers | Dale V. Sandstrom | Gerald W. VandeWalle | Carol Ronning Kapsner | Daniel J. Crothers |
| 42nd (2016–2017) | Lisa K. Fair McEvers | Jerod E. Tufte | Gerald W. VandeWalle | Carol Ronning Kapsner | Daniel J. Crothers |
| 43rd (2017–2023) | Lisa K. Fair McEvers | Jerod E. Tufte | Gerald W. VandeWalle | Jon J. Jensen | Daniel J. Crothers |
| 44th (2023–2026) | Lisa K. Fair McEvers | Jerod E. Tufte | Douglas Bahr | Jon J. Jensen | Daniel J. Crothers |
| 45th (2026–present) | Lisa K. Fair McEvers | Jerod E. Tufte | Douglas Bahr | Jon J. Jensen | Mark Friese |
