= List of chief justices of the North Dakota Supreme Court =

The following is a list of chief justices of the North Dakota Supreme Court.

See also the List of justices of the North Dakota Supreme Court

| # | Name | Term | Life |
|---|---|---|---|
| 1 | Guy C. H. Corliss | 1889–1892 | 1858–1937 |
| 2 | Joseph Bartholomew | 1892–1894 | 1843–1901 |
| 3 | Alfred Wallin | 1894–1896 | 1836–1923 |
| 4 | Guy C. H. Corliss | 1896–1899 | 1858–1937 |
| 5 | Joseph Bartholomew | 1899–1901 | 1843–1901 |
| 6 | Alfred Wallin | 1901–1903 | 1836–1923 |
| 7 | Newton C. Young | 1903–1906 | 1862–1923 |
| 8 | David Morgan | 1906–1911 | 1849–1912 |
| 9 | Burleigh F. Spalding | 1911–1915 | 1853–1934 |
| 10 | Charles Joseph Fisk | 1915–1917 | 1862–1932 |
| 11 | Andrew A. Bruce | 1917–1918 | 1866–1934 |
| 12 | Adolph M. Christianson | 1918–1921 | 1877–1954 |
| 13 | James Robinson | 1921 | 1843–1933 |
| 14 | Richard Grace | 1921–1922 | 1868–1929 |
| 15 | Luther E. Birdzell | 1922–1923 | 1880–1973 |
| 16 | Harrison A. Bronson | 1923–1925 | 1873–1947 |
| 17 | Adolph M. Christianson | 1925–1927 | 1877–1954 |
| 18 | Luther E. Birdzell | 1927–1928 | 1880–1973 |
| 19 | William Nuessle | 1928–1929 | 1878–1959 |
| 20 | John Burke | 1929–1931 | 1859–1937 |
| 21 | Adolph M. Christianson | 1931–1933 | 1877–1954 |
| 22 | William Nuessle | 1933 | 1878–1959 |
| 23 | Luther E. Birdzell | 1933 | 1880–1973 |
| 24 | Alexander Burr | 1933–1935 | 1871–1951 |
| 25 | John Burke | 1935–1937 | 1859–1937 |
| 26 | Adolph M. Christianson | 1937–1939 | 1877–1954 |
| 27 | William Nuessle | 1939–1941 | 1878–1959 |
| 28 | Alexander Burr | 1941–1943 | 1871–1951 |
| 29 | James Morris | 1943–1945 | 1893–1980 |
| 30 | Adolph M. Christianson | 1945–1949 | 1877–1954 |
| 31 | William Nuessle | 1949–1951 | 1878–1959 |
| 32 | James Morris | 1951–1955 | 1893–1980 |
| 33 | Thomas J. Burke | 1955–1957 | 1896–1966 |
| 34 | Gudmunder Grimson | 1957–1959 | 1878–1965 |
| 35 | Peter O. (P.O.) Sathre | 1959–1963 | 1876–1968 |
| 36 | James Morris | 1963–1965 | 1893–1980 |
| 37 | Thomas J. Burke | 1965–1966 | 1896–1966 |
| 38 | Obert C. Teigen | 1965–1966 | 1908–1978 |
| 39 | Alvin C. Strutz | 1967 | 1903–1973 |
| 40 | Obert C. Teigen | 1967–1971 | 1908–1978 |
| 41 | Alvin C. Strutz | 1971–1973 | 1903–1973 |
| 42 | Ralph J. Erickstad | 1973–1992 | 1922–2001 |
| 43 | Gerald W. VandeWalle | 1993–2019 | 1933– |
| 44 | Jon J. Jensen | 2020–2025 | 1965– |
| 45 | Lisa K. Fair McEvers | 2026–present | 1962– |
