= William Nuessle =

American judge (1878–1959)

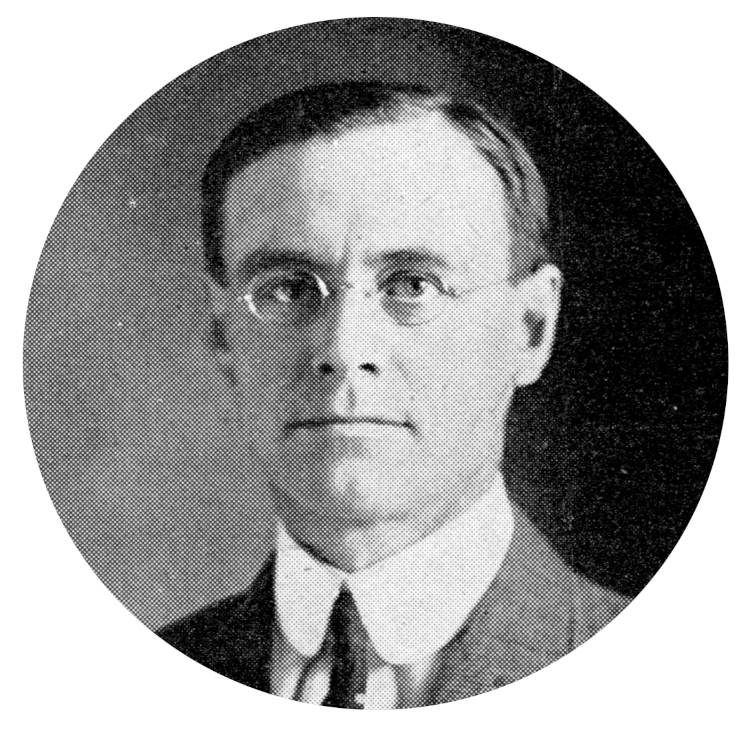

Chief Justice of North Dakota
- In office 1949–1951
- Preceded by: Adolph M. Christianson
- Succeeded by: James Morrison
- In office 1939–1941
- Preceded by: Adolph M. Christianson
- Succeeded by: Alexander Burr
- In office 1933
- Preceded by: Adolph M. Christianson
- Succeeded by: Luther E. Birdzell
- In office 1928–1929
- Preceded by: Luther E. Birdzell
- Succeeded by: John Burke

Justice of the North Dakota Supreme Court
- In office 1922 – December 31, 1950
- Preceded by: Richard Grace
- Succeeded by: Gudmunder Grimson

Judge of the North Dakota District Courts
- In office 1912 – 1922; 4th judicial district 6th judicial district

State's Attorney for McLean County

Personal details
- Born: May 5, 1878 North Boston, New York, U.S.
- Died: March 30, 1959 (aged 81)
- Party: Republican
- Education: University of North Dakota (B.A., J.D.)

William L. Nuessle (May 5, 1878 – March 30, 1959) was a justice of the North Dakota Supreme Court from 1923 to December 31, 1950. He first won election to court in 1922. He subsequently won reelection in 1928, 1934, and 1940. He had previously served as a judge on the North Dakota District Courts and as the state's attorney for McLean County.

== Early life and education ==
Nuessle was born May 5, 1878, in North Boston, New York. In 1866, he moved with his parents to the Dakota Territory, living on a farm near Emerato in Grand Forks County.

Nuessle attended public schools in the Grand Forks area for his early education. He attended the University of North Dakota, receiving his Bachelor of Arts in 1889 and his Juris Doctor in 1901.

== Career ==
Nuessle was admitted to the bar and opened a legal office in Goodrich, North Dakota. In 1904, he moved to Washburn, North Dakota and was elected state's attorney for McLean County, holding the position for four years.

In 1912, Nuessle was elected to the District Court of North Dakota bench. On this court he served in the sixth and fourth judicial districts. He served on this court until his 1922 election to the North Dakota Supreme Court.

Nuessle was elected at the age of 44 to the Supreme Court of North Dakota. He was reelected in 1928, 1934, and 1940. He ran for judge as a Republican. After serving on the bench for 28 years he retired on December 31, 1950, at the expiration of the final term to which he had been elected.

After his retirement, he remained in Bismarck, North Dakota. He died on March 30, 1959, at the age of 80.

== Coaching record ==
| Year | Team | Overall | Conference | Standing | Bowl/playoffs |
|---|---|---|---|---|---|
North Dakota Flickertails (Independent) (1901)
| 1901 | North Dakota | 3–4 | | | |
| North Dakota: | | 3–4 | | | |
| Total: | | 3–4 | | | |
