= Adolph M. Christianson =

American judge (1877–1954)

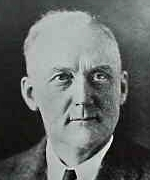

Chief Justice of North Dakota
- In office 1945–1949
- Preceded by: James Morris
- Succeeded by: William Nuessle
- In office 1937–1939
- Preceded by: John Burke
- Succeeded by: William Neussle
- In office 1931–1933
- Preceded by: John Burke
- Succeeded by: William Neussle
- In office 1925–1927
- Preceded by: Harrison A. Bronson
- Succeeded by: Luther E. Birdzell
- In office 1918–1921
- Preceded by: Andrew A. Bruce
- Succeeded by: James Robinson

Justice of the North Dakota Supreme Court
- In office 1889–1902
- Preceded by: Burleigh F. Spalding
- Succeeded by: Nelson Johnson

State's Attorney of McHenry County, North Dakota
- In office 1901–1905

Personal details
- Born: 1887; Brumunddal, Norway
- Died: February 11, 1954 (age 76)

Adolph M. Christianson (August 11, 1877 – February 11, 1954) was an attorney and a justice of the North Dakota Supreme Court.

== Background ==
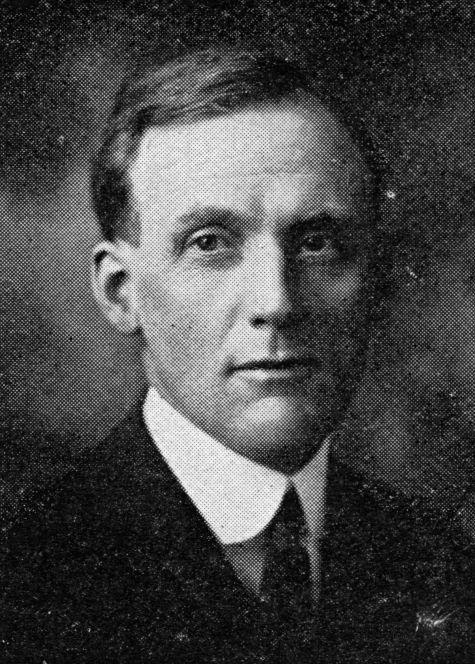
Justice Adolph M. Christianson, c. 1919

Adolph Marcus Christianson was born in Brumunddal in Ringsaker Municipality in Hedmark County, Norway. He came to the United States with his parents in 1882. He spent his childhood in Polk County, Minnesota and received his early education in the Minnesota public schools. He attended the Law Department of the University of Tennessee. He was admitted to the bar on March 27, 1889. He moved to North Dakota in 1900 and was admitted to the North Dakota Bar.

== Career ==
Christianson opened an office in Towner, North Dakota, where he practiced until his election to the North Dakota Supreme Court. He served as state's attorney from 1901 until 1905. Christianson served as a justice of the North Dakota Supreme Court from 1915 to 1954 and the chief justice from 1918 to 1921, 1925 to 1927, 1931 to 1933, 1937 to 1939, and 1945 to 1949. Christianson died in office at the age of 76 after having served on the Court for 39 years and one month. His burial was at the Fairview Cemetery in Bismarck, North Dakota.

Legal offices
| Preceded by Andrew A. Bruce | Chief Justice of North Dakota; 1918–1921 | Succeeded by James Robinson |
| Preceded by Harrison A. Bronson | Chief Justice of North Dakota; 1925–1927 | Succeeded by Luther E. Birdzell |
| Preceded by John Burke | Chief Justice of North Dakota; 1931–1933 | Succeeded by William Nuessle |
| Preceded by John Burke | Chief Justice of North Dakota; 1937–1939 | Succeeded by William Nuessle |
| Preceded by James Morris | Chief Justice of North Dakota; 1945–1949 | Succeeded by William Nuessle |
