= Jon J. Jensen =

American judge (born 1965)

Jon Jensen

Chief Justice of the North Dakota Supreme Court
- In office January 1, 2020 – January 1, 2026
- Preceded by: Gerald W. VandeWalle
- Succeeded by: Lisa K. Fair McEvers

Justice of the North Dakota Supreme Court
- Incumbent
- Assumed office August 15, 2017
- Appointed by: Doug Burgum
- Preceded by: Carol Ronning Kapsner

Personal details
- Born: August 2, 1965 (age 60) Grand Forks, North Dakota, U.S.
- Education: Minnesota State University, Mankato (BS); University of North Dakota (JD)

Jon J. Jensen (born August 2, 1965) is an American lawyer who has served as an associate justice of the North Dakota Supreme Court since 2017. He served as chief justice from 2020 to 2026. He previously served as a district court judge in North Dakota from 2013 to 2017.

== Education and early career ==
Jensen was born in Grand Forks, North Dakota, in 1965. He graduated from East Grand Forks Senior High School. Jensen completed a Bachelor of Science degree in accounting at Minnesota State University, Mankato in 1987, and a Juris Doctor degree at the University of North Dakota School of Law in 1990. He clerked for North Dakota Supreme Court Chief Justice Ralph J. Erickstad in 1990-91.

Jensen was in private practice from 1991 to 2012 with the Grand Forks law firm Pearson Christensen, specializing in tax law and commercial litigation. He and his wife Linda Bata then operated their own firm, Jensen Bata, in 2012-2013. Jensen also taught trial advocacy as an adjunct faculty member at the University of North Dakota School of Law, and occasionally served as a special assistant to the North Dakota Attorney General.

== Judicial service ==
The Governor of North Dakota Jack Dalrymple appointed Jensen as a state judge in November 2013, serving in the Northeast Central Judicial District, which covers Grand Forks and Nelson counties. Jensen served as presiding judge in 2015-2017. He was re-elected unopposed to a new six-year term in 2016.

In April 2017, North Dakota Supreme Court justice Carol Ronning Kapsner announced that she would retire from the court, effective from July 31, 2017. A judicial nominating commission provided the Governor of North Dakota Doug Burgum with three names of possible replacements for the vacancy: Jensen, and two other state judges, James Hill and Robin Schmidt. Governor Doug Burgum announced that he had selected Jensen to replace Kapnser on July 12.

Jensen was sworn in as a justice of the North Dakota Supreme Court on August 15, 2017. He was elected chief justice on December 12, 2019. His current term on the court expires on December 31, 2030, and he is eligible to run for re-election to a new ten-year term.

== Publications ==
- "Limitations on Easements in North Dakota May Have Unintended Consequences for Qualified Conservation Easement Charitable Contributions," 87 N.D. Law Rev. 343 (2011).
- "Reducing the Employment Tax Burden on Tenure Buyouts," 80 N.D. Law Rev. 11 (2004).
- "Limiting Self-Employment Taxation of Actively Farming Landlords," 78 N.D. Law Rev. 101 (2002).
- "Satisfaction of a Compelling Governmental Interest or Simply Two Convictions for the Price of One?" 69 N.D. Law Rev. 915 (1993).
- "Fredericks v. Eide-Kirschman Ford: The Vehicle to Enforcing Tribal Court Civil Judgments," 68 N.D. Law Rev. 675 (1992).

Legal offices
Preceded by Carol Ronning Kapsner	Associate Justice of the North Dakota Supreme Court; 2017–present	Incumbent
Preceded by Gerald W. VandeWalle	Chief Justice of the North Dakota Supreme Court; 2020–2026	Succeeded by Lisa K. Fair McEvers
