= Obert C. Teigen =

American judge

Obert Teigen

Justice of the North Dakota Supreme Court
- In office January 13, 1959 – July 1974
- Preceded by: Gudmunder Grimson
- Succeeded by: J. Philip Johnson

Personal details
- Born: September 27, 1908 Tolna, North Dakota, U.S.
- Died: May 26, 1978 (aged 69)
- Children: 1
- Education: University of North Dakota (BS, LLB)

Obert C. Teigen (September 27, 1908 – May 26, 1978) was an American attorney and jurist who served as a justice of the North Dakota Supreme Court from 1959 to 1974.

== Early life and education ==
Justice Obert C. Teigen was born near Tolna, North Dakota. He graduated from Edmore High School in 1927. He attended the University of North Dakota, where he received a Bachelor of Science degree in 1931 and a law degree in 1934.

== Career ==
He was admitted to the North Dakota Bar in 1934, and later spent a two-year period as a special agent for the FBI. He practiced law in Devils Lake, North Dakota until 1954. He also served as Ramsey County State's Attorney from 1937 to 1943 and from 1945 to 1946. He served as District Judge for the Second Judicial District from 1954 to 1958.

On December 31, 1958, he was appointed to the Supreme Court to replace Justice Gudmunder Grimson, (1878–1965). He assumed office on January 13, 1959, at the age of 50. He was elected to a ten-year term in 1960 and reelected in 1970. He resigned in July 1974 and was succeeded by J. Philip Johnson.

Following his retirement from the Court, Justice Teigen accepted an appointment as an Administrative Judge with the Social Security Administration in 1975, but he developed a terminal illness in the late-1970s, which forced his resignation in February 1978.

== Personal life ==
He was married to Ople Braund (1909–2002) in 1934. They had one son. Justice Teigen died in 1978 at the age of 69. He was buried at Sunset Memorial Gardens in Burleigh County, North Dakota.

Legal offices
Preceded by Thomas J. Burke	Chief Justice of North Dakota; 1965–1966	Succeeded by Alvin C. Strutz
Preceded by Alvin C. Strutz	Chief Justice of North Dakota; 1971–1973	Succeeded by Alvin C. Strutz
