= Paul M. Sand =

American judge from North Dakota (1914–1984)

Justice of the North Dakota Supreme Court
- In office October 21, 1914 – December 8, 1984
- Preceded by: J. Philip Johnson
- Succeeded by: Herbert L. Meschke

Personal details
- Born: Paul Meinrad Sand; October 21, 1914 Balta, North Dakota, U.S.
- Died: December 8, 1984 (aged 70) Burleigh County, North Dakota, U.S.
- Education: University of North Dakota (LLB)

Military service
- Branch/service: United States Army
- Battles/wars: World War II

Paul Meinrad Sand (October 21, 1914 – December 8, 1984) was an American attorney and jurist who served as an associate jurist on the North Dakota Supreme Court from 1975 to 1984.

== Early life and education ==
Sand was born in Balta, North Dakota. He earned a Bachelor of Laws from the University of North Dakota School of Law.

== Career ==
He served in the United States Army during World War II, where he was assigned to the United States Army Judge Advocate General's Corps in Berlin. He also worked for the United Nations War Crimes Commission. After retiring from the Army, Sand established a private legal practice in Rugby, North Dakota. He served as assistant North Dakota attorney general from 1949 to 1975.
