= David Morgan (judge) =

American judge

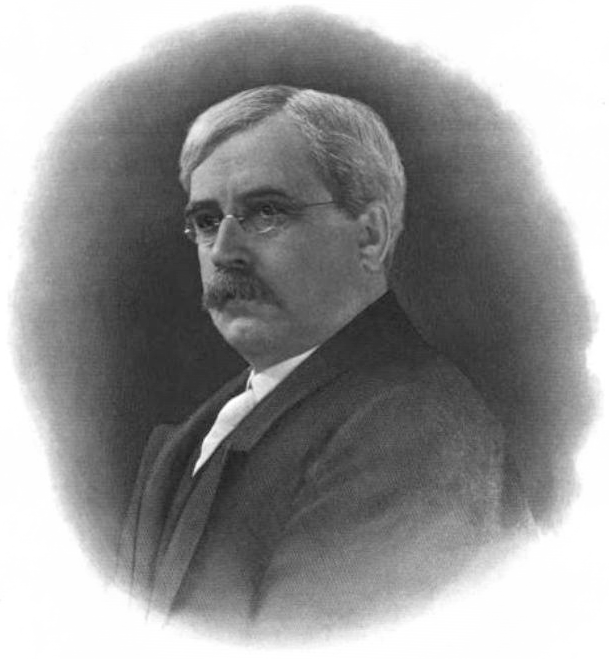

Chief Justice of North Dakota
- In office 1906–1911
- Preceded by: Newton C. Young
- Succeeded by: Burleigh F. Spalding

Justice of the North Dakota Supreme Court
- In office 1901–1911
- Preceded by: Joseph Bartholomew
- Succeeded by: Andrew A. Bruce

Judge of the North Dakota District Courts

State's Attorney of Ramsey County, North Dakota

Clerk of the Sauk County, Wisconsin Courts

Personal details
- Born: November 8, 1849 Coalport, Ohio
- Died: May 11, 1912 (aged 62) Banning, California
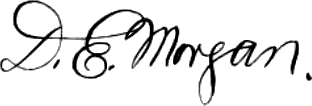
- Signature

David E. Morgan (November 8, 1849 – May 11, 1912) was an American judge who served as a justice of the Supreme Court of North Dakota from 1901 to 1911.

== Early life and education ==
Morgan was born on November 8, 1849, in Coalport, Ohio. At a young age, he moved to the state of Wisconsin with his parents. He attended common schools there, being educated at Spring Green Academy and Plattville State Normal School. He also took a year-long special course at Wisconsin State University.

== Career ==
After leaving Wisconsin State University, Morgan taught school in Ironton, Wisconsin. He served later as a principal of a school in Chilton.

Morgan was elected to serve as the Sauk County clerk of court. During his terms in this position, he read law with a number of judges. He was then admitted to practice law in 1879.

In 1881, Morgan resigned as clerk of court, moving to practice law in the Dakota Territory. In 1883, he moved to Devil's Lake, where he served for four years as the state's attorney for Ramsey County. He, thereafter, served for eleven years as a judge of the District Courts of North Dakota.

After his eleven years on the state's district courts, Morgan was elected in 1900 to the North Dakota Supreme Court. He entered the bench at the age of 51, and served for roughly ten years and eight months before resigning on August 31, 1911, due to poor health. After he retired, he moved to Banning, California, where he died on May 11, 1912.
