= Beryl J. Levine =

American judge (1935–2022)

Justice of the North Dakota Supreme Court
- In office January 17, 1985 – March 1, 1996
- Appointed by: George A. Sinner
- Preceded by: Vernon R. Pederson
- Succeeded by: Mary Muehlen Maring

Personal details
- Born: Beryl Joyce Choslovsky; November 9, 1935 Winnipeg, Manitoba, Canada
- Died: June 4, 2022 (aged 86) Palo Alto, California, U.S.
- Spouse: Dr. Leonard Levine (m. 1955; died 2020)
- Education: University of Manitoba (BA); University of North Dakota (JD)

Beryl Joyce Levine (née Choslovsky; November 9, 1935 – June 4, 2022) was a justice of the North Dakota Supreme Court from 1985 to 1996. Levine was the first ever female justice of the state's court.

== Education ==
Levine was born on November 9, 1935, in Winnipeg, Manitoba, Canada to Bella and Maurice “Chick” Choslovsky. She earned a Bachelor of Arts from the University of Manitoba in 1964 and a Juris Doctor from the University of North Dakota School of Law in 1974.

== Career ==
After graduating law school, she worked at the Vogel Law Firm from 1974 until her appointment to the bench in 1985. On January 17, 1985, she was appointed to the North Dakota Supreme Court by Governor George A. Sinner, becoming the first woman ever appointed. She served for eleven years, resigning on March 1, 1996. In 1996, she was awarded the Margaret Brent Award and in 2005, she was also awarded the Sioux Award, the highest honor given by the University of North Dakota Alumni Association & Foundation for achievement, service and loyalty.

== Personal life ==
Levine married Dr. Leonard Levine on June 7, 1955, and he preceded her in death in 2020. She died on June 4, 2022, in San Mateo, California, aged 86.

== See also ==
- List of female state supreme court justices
