= J. Philip Johnson =

American judge

J. Phillip Johnson

Justice of the North Dakota Supreme Court
- In office February 11, 1992 – January 1, 1993
- Appointed by: George A. Sinner
- Preceded by: H. F. Gierke III
- Succeeded by: Paul M. Sand
- In office June 1974 – January 9, 1975
- Appointed by: Arthur A. Link
- Preceded by: Obert C. Teigen
- Succeeded by: Dale V. Sandstrom

Personal details
- Born: March 28, 1938 (age 88)
- Education: University of North Dakota (BA, JD)

J. Philip Johnson (born March 28, 1938) is an American attorney and jurist who served as a Justice of the North Dakota Supreme Court from 1974 to 1975 again in 1992. When not serving as justice of the state court, Johnson operated a private legal practice in Fargo, North Dakota.

== Early life and education ==
He was born in Minot, North Dakota and attended Minot State University before earning a Bachelor of Arts in philosophy from the University of North Dakota in 1960. He earned a Juris Doctor degree from the University of North Dakota School of Law in 1962.

== Career ==
Following admission to the State Bar Association of North Dakota, he was admitted to the Judge Advocate General's Corps, United States Army. After three years of active duty, including service in Washington, D.C. handling court martial appeals, he returned to North Dakota. He then joined a law firm in Fargo for several years and also served as Assistant State's Attorney for Cass County, North Dakota.

In June 1974, Johnson was appointed to the Supreme Court. He was defeated for re-election to a full term and left office on January 9, 1975, after serving for seven months. After the resignation of Justice H. F. Gierke III, Governor George A. Sinner appointed Johnson to the Court on February 11, 1992. He served until January 1, 1993, after an unsuccessful election bid to fill out the remaining term. Johnson then returned to private practice in the Fargo law firm of Wold Johnson, P.C.
