= John M. Cochrane =

American judge (1859–1904)

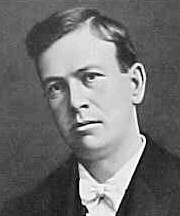

Justice of the North Dakota Supreme Court
- In office 1903–1904
- Preceded by: Alfred Wallin
- Succeeded by: Edward Engerud

State's Attorney of Grand Forks County, North Dakota
- In office 1887–1891

Probate Judge of Grand Forks County
- In office 1895–1897

Personal details
- Born: November 8, 1849 Mount Pleasant, Pennsylvania
- Died: July 20, 1904 (aged 45)
- Education: University of Michigan Law School

John M. Cochrane (March 11, 1859 – July 20, 1904) was an American judge who served as a justice of the Supreme Court of North Dakota from 1903 to 1904. He died in office.

== Early life and education ==
Cochrane was born in Mount Pleasant, Pennsylvania. He moved with his parents to Canton, Illinois, in 1861. In 1865, they moved further west to Faribault, Minnesota. In 1873, they moved to Minneapolis, Minnesota.

In 1976, Cochrane attended the State University of Minnesota. In 1879, he abegan attending University of Michigan Law School, graduating in 1881.

== Career ==
Cochrane was admitted to the Minnesota Bar and practiced law in Minnesota until March 1883. In March 1883, Cochrane moved to Grand Forks, Dakota Territory. He practiced law there until the fall of 1894, when he was elected Probate Judge of Grand Forks County to a two-year term. He was reelected to this position in 1886, and resigned in 1887 in order to be accept his appointment as state's attorney of Grand Forks County. He won a full term as state's attorney in 1888 for a two-year term.

For several years, Cochrane taught criminal law at the University of North Dakota School of Law.

In 1902, Cochran was elected to the North Dakota Supreme Court. He served for only one year and seven months before dying in office on July 20, 1904, at the age of 45.
