= John Carmody (judge) =

American judge (1854–1920)

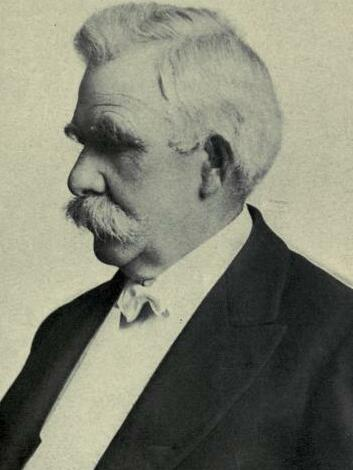

Justice of the North Dakota Supreme Court
- In office January 15, 1909 – 1910
- Appointed by: John Burke
- Preceded by: Seat established
- Succeeded by: Edward T. Burke

State's Attorney of Traill County

City Attorney of Hillsboro, North Dakota

Mayor of Hillsboro, North Dakota

Personal details
- Born: January 6, 1854 Granville, Wisconsin
- Died: February 19, 1920 (aged 66)

John Carmody (January 6, 1854 – February 19, 1920) was a justice of the North Dakota Supreme Court from January 15, 1909, to 1910.

== Early life and education ==
Carmody was born January 6, 1854, in Granville, Wisconsin (which is today part of Milwaukee). He was educated in public schools. At the age of 14, he and his parents moved who Waseca, Minnesota. In Waseca, Carmody attended high school. After high school, he worked as a teacher for several years before studying law in a Waseca attorney's office.

== Legal, political, and judicial careers ==
In March 1880, Carmody was admitted to the Minnesota Bar after several years of legal studies. He practiced as a lawyer in Waseca until August 1885, when he moved to the community of Hillsboro in the Dakota Territory. In Hillsboro, he served a single term as mayor, fourteen years as city attorney, and a single term as the state's attorney of Traill County.

On January 15, 1909, Carmody was appointed by Governor John Burke to the North Dakota Supreme Court after the state constitution of North Dakota increased the court from three to five justices. Taking the bench at the age of 55, he served for less than two years (1 year and 11 ½ months), being defeated for election to a full term in 1910.

After leaving the bench, Carmody served as assistant attorney general for a number of years, a member of the state's Board of Control for two years, and assistant United States attorney for North Dakota.

Carmody died on February 19, 1920, at the age of 66.

== Personal life ==
On July 12, 1886, in Waseca, Carmody married Anna Madden. Together they had three children.

Carmody was a member of the Benevolent and Protective Order of Elks, Independent Order of Foresters, Brotherhood of American Yeoman, Knights of Columbus, Ancient Order of United Workmen of the State of North Dakota, and was grand master of the Grand Lodge of the Ancient Order of United Workman of the State of North Dakota.
