= Alvin C. Strutz =

American judge

Chief Justice of North Dakota
- In office 1971 – June 16, 1973
- Appointed by: John E. Davis
- Preceded by: Obert C. Teigen
- Succeeded by: Ralph J. Erickstad
- In office 1967
- Preceded by: Obert C. Teigen
- Succeeded by: Obert C. Teigen

Justice of the North Dakota Supreme Court
- In office January 13, 1959 – June 16, 1973
- Appointed by: William Langer
- Preceded by: Nels Johnson
- Succeeded by: Robert Vogel

Attorney General of North Dakota
- In office 1937–1944
- Preceded by: Peter O. Sathre
- Succeeded by: Nels Johnson

Personal details
- Born: May 5, 1903 Milbank, South Dakota
- Died: June 16, 1973 (aged 70)
- Children: 1
- Education: University of North Dakota (BS, LLB)

Alvin C. Strutz (May 5, 1903 – June 16, 1973) was an American lawyer, politician, and judge. He served as the North Dakota attorney general from 1937 to 1944 and ran for governor of North Dakota in 1944. He served as chief justice of the North Dakota Supreme Court in 1967 and from 1971 to 1973, and as a justice of the court from 1959 through 1974. He died while serving on the court at the age of 70 in 1973 after serving for 14 years.

== Biography ==
Alvin Strutz was born on May 5, 1903, in Milbank, South Dakota. the son of Rev. and Mrs. R. E. Strutz of Jamestown, North Dakota. He attended the public elementary school and secondary school in Jamestown, graduating from Jamestown High School in 1921. He graduated from Jamestown College in 1925 with a Bachelor of Arts. He spent two years after his graduation as a high school teacher, and entered law school at the University of North Dakota in 1927, graduating in 1930 with a Juris Doctor. He practiced law in Jamestown from 1930 until April 1933 when he moved his practice to Bismarck, North Dakota.

In December 1937, Sturtz was appointed by the governor as attorney general of North Dakota upon the resignation of Peter O. Sathre (who had been appointed to the North Dakota Supreme Court). He served in that capacity until 1944 when he did not seek re-election. He was elected to a full term in 1938 and reelected in 1940 and 1942. In 1944, instead of seeking reelection, Sturtz unsuccessfully ran for governor of North Dakota.

After leaving office as attorney general, Sturtz practiced law in Bismarck until being appointed to the North Dakota Supreme Court.

In 1967, Strutz was appointed to the North Dakota Supreme Court effective April 11, 1959, to the seat vacated by the death in office of Nels Johnson. He served until his own death in office at the age of 70 on June 16, 1975. During his tenure on the court, he served as the chief justice twice: in 1967 and again from 1971 to 1973. Strutz was married to Vee Minor on August 28, 1930, in Riceville, Iowa. They had three children; William, Donna Vee and Judith Ann.

== Notes ==
Party political offices
Preceded by Peter O. Sathre	Republican nominee for North Dakota Attorney General; 1938, 1940, 1942	Succeeded by Nels Johnson
Legal offices
Preceded by Peter O. Sathre	Attorney General of North Dakota; 1937–1944	Succeeded by Nels G. Johnson
Preceded by Obert C. Teigen	Chief Justice of North Dakota; 1967	Succeeded by Obert C. Teigen
Preceded by Obert C. Teigen	Chief Justice of North Dakota; 1971–1973	Succeeded by Ralph J. Erickstad
