= Edward T. Burke =

American judge

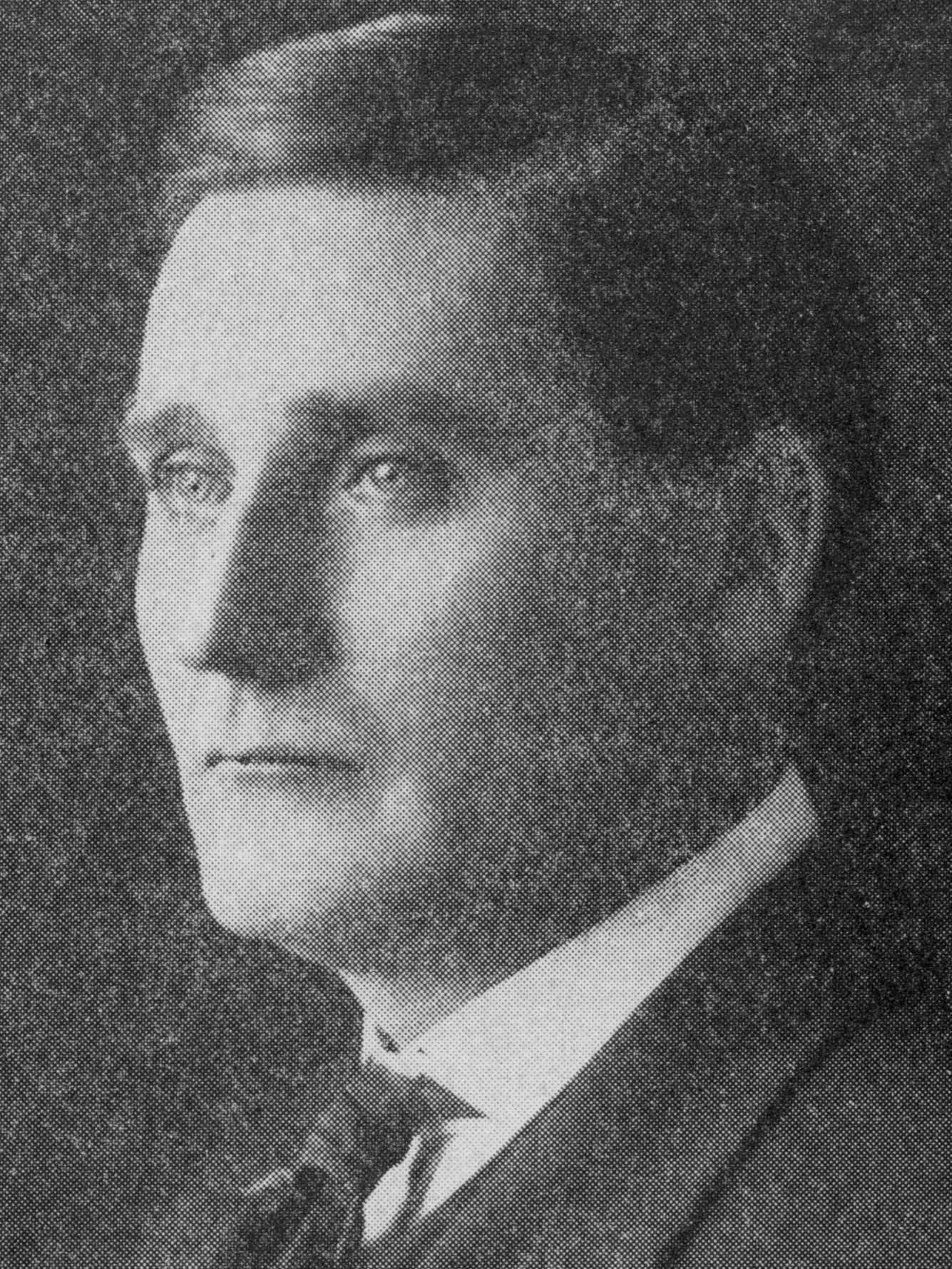

Justice of the North Dakota Supreme Court
- In office 1911–1916
- Preceded by: John Carmody
- Succeeded by: James Robinson

Judge of the Fifth Judicial District of North Dakota
- In office 1910–1911

State's Attorney for Barnes County, North Dakota
- In office 1901-1905

Personal details
- Born: November 5, 1870 Minnesota
- Died: December 25, 1935 (aged 65) Flossmoor, Illinois
- Education: University of Minnesota

Edward Timothy Burke (November 5, 1870 – December 25, 1935) was an American judge who served as a justice of the Supreme Court of North Dakota from 1911 to 1916.

== Biography ==
Edward Burke was born near Minneapolis, Minnesota. Shortly after his birth, the Burke family moved to Dakota Territory. Burke later attended the University of North Dakota and then after two years transferred to the University of Minnesota, where he received his law degree. He was admitted to the North Dakota Bar and started a practice in Valley City.

From 1901 to 1905 he served as the state's attorney for Barnes County. He was later elected as judge of the Fifth Judicial District of North Dakota. In 1910, he resigned his position as judge and ran in the general election for a spot on the North Dakota Supreme Court, defeating Justice John Carmody. He served on the North Dakota Supreme Court until he was defeated in the election of 1916.

After losing the election, he practiced law in Bismarck until 1926, when he was appointed a special investigator for the Department of Justice. He served in this role until his death in 1935.

== Personal life and death ==
Burke married Florence E. Getchell in 1900. He died on Christmas Day 1935 in Flossmoor, Illinois, at age 65.

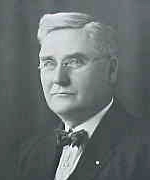
Burke during his term on the Supreme Court of North Dakota

== See also ==
- List of justices of the North Dakota Supreme Court
