= Newton C. Young =

American judge

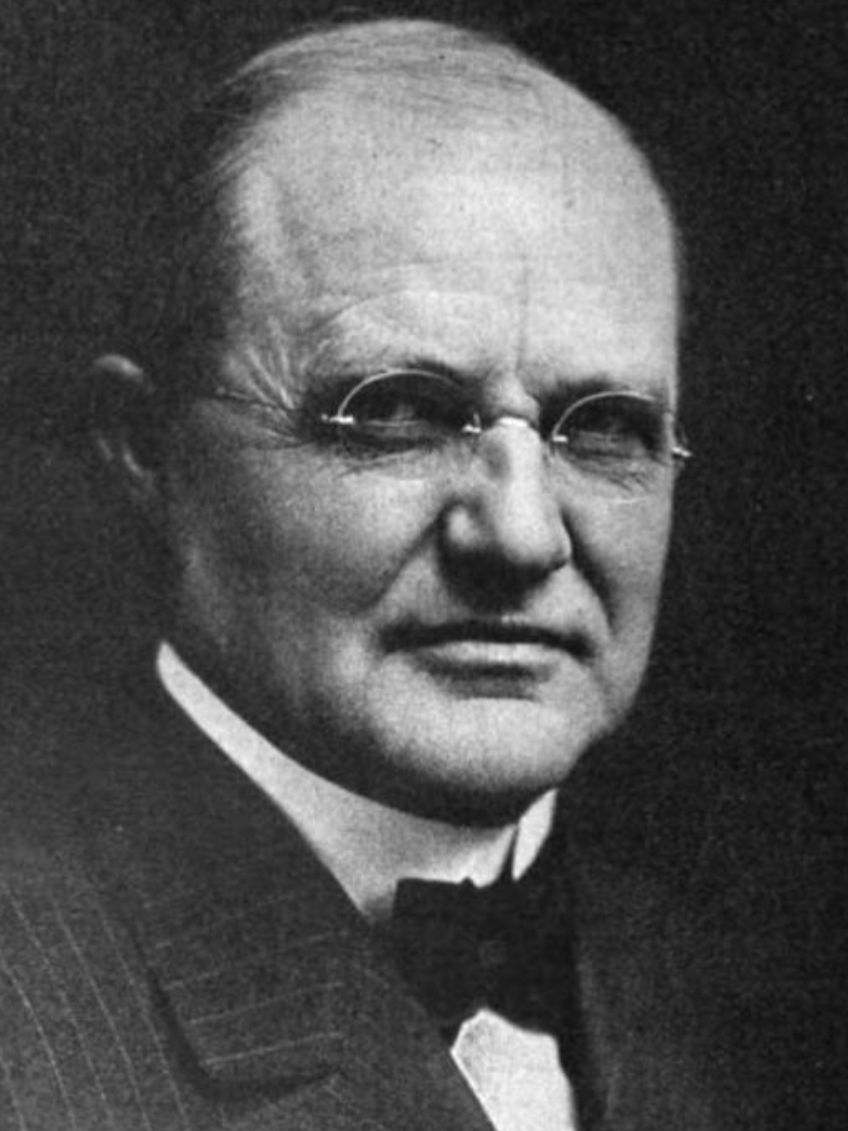

Chief Justice of North Dakota
- In office 1903–1906
- Preceded by: Alfred Wallin
- Succeeded by: David Morgan

Justice of the North Dakota Supreme Court
- In office 1898–1906
- Appointed by: Joseph M. Devine
- Preceded by: Guy C. H. Corliss
- Succeeded by: John Knauf

State's Attorney of Pembina County, North Dakota
- In office 1892–1896

Personal details
- Born: January 28, 1862 Mount Pleasant, Iowa
- Died: November 10, 1923 (aged 61) Fargo, North Dakota
- Party: Republican
- Spouse: Ida B. Clarke
- Education: Iowa State University (B.A., LL.B., M.A.)
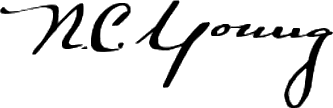
- Signature

Newton C. Young (January 28, 1862 – November 10, 1923) was an American judge who served as a justice of the Supreme Court of North Dakota from 1898 to 1906. He had previously served as the state's attorney of Pembina County, North Dakota.

== Early life and education ==
Young was born on January 28, 1862, in Mount Pleasant, Iowa. He was the son of C.S. Young and Joanna E. Young. He received his elementary school education in Taber, Iowa and graduated from Iowa City Academy in 1882. In 1886, he graduated from Iowa State University with a Bachelor of Arts degree. He received Bachelor of Laws degree from the university the following year. He later received a Masters of Arts degree from the university in 1891.

== Legal and judicial career ==
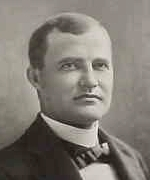

In 1887, Young moved to Bathgate, Dakota Territory. He practiced law there until getting appointed to the North Dakota Supreme Court. While practicing law in this period, he also served two terms as the state's attorney of Pembina County from 1892 through 1896. Politically, Young was a Republican.

In 1898, at the age of 36, he was appointed by Governor Joseph M. Devine to complete the term of Guy C. H. Corliss on the North Dakota Supreme Court. Young, nominated by the Republican Party, was elected in his own right that year to a full term. His opponent had been Charles J. Fisk. He was reelected to a second term in 1904. He served on the court for approximately seven years and ten and one-half months. He was chief justice for a time. In 1906, Young resigned from the court. He practiced law in Fargo, North Dakota until his death. After resigning from the court he joined the firm Ball, Watson & Young (later Watson & Young). The firm served as division counsel of the Northern Pacific Railway.

Young served as a trustee of North Dakota State University from 1907 through 1915.

== Personal life and death ==
Young married Ida B. Clarke on June 23, 1887, in Iowa City, Iowa. They had one son and two daughters. He was a member of several organizations and fraternities, including Phi Delta Theta and Phi Beta Kappa, and the Shriners.

Young died on November 10, 1923, at the age of 61.
