= Charles Joseph Fisk =

American judge (1862–1932)

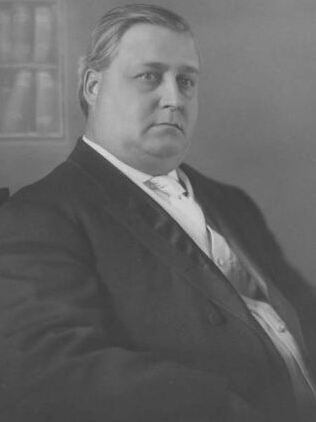

Referee of the North Dakota State Guaranty Fund Commission
- In office 1923–1932

Chief Justice of North Dakota
- In office 1911–1915
- Preceded by: Burleigh F. Spalding
- Succeeded by: Andrew A. Bruce

Justice of the North Dakota Supreme Court
- In office 1907–1916
- Preceded by: John Knauf
- Succeeded by: Luther E. Birdzell

Justice of North Dakota's First Judicial District
- In office 1907–1917

Personal details
- Born: March 11, 1862 Morrison, Illinois
- Died: May 8, 1932 (age 70) Minot, North Dakota
- Education: Northern Illinois College
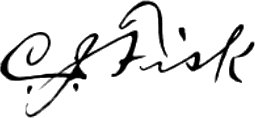
- Signature

Charles Joseph Fisk (March 11, 1862 – May 8, 1932) was an American judge who served as a justice of the Supreme Court of North Dakota from 1907 to 1916.

== Biography ==
Fisk was born on March 11, 1862, in Morrison, Illinois. He attended elementary and secondary school in the town's schools before attending Northern Illinois College in Fulton.

Upon earning his law degree at the age of 21 in 1883, he moved to Dakota Territory and was admitted to the bar in 1886. After a brief time of practicing law in what is now Larimore, North Dakota, Fisk moved to Grand Forks, North Dakota, and practiced law until 1897. In 1897, he was elected district judge for North Dakota's first judicial district and served for 10 years with his chambers in Grand Forks. In 1906, he ran in the general election for North Dakota State Supreme Court and won. He assumed office in January 1907 at age 44 and was reelected to a full term in 1910. He was defeated for reelection to the court by Luther E. Birdzell in 1916. He returned to private legal practice in Minot, North Dakota, continuing this work until 1923 when he was appointed Referee of the State Guaranty Fund Commission. He held this position until it was abolished shortly before his death. He died in Minot, North Dakota, on May 8, 1932, at age 70.
