= Guy C. H. Corliss =

American judge

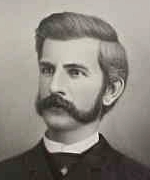

Chief Justice of North Dakota
- In office 1896–1899
- Preceded by: Alfred Wallin
- Succeeded by: Joseph Bartholomew
- In office 1889–1892
- Preceded by: Position established
- Succeeded by: Joseph Bartholomew

Justice of the North Dakota Supreme Court
- In office 1889–1898
- Preceded by: Seat established
- Succeeded by: Newton C. Young

Personal details
- Born: July 4, 1858 Poughkeepsie, New York
- Died: November 24, 1937 (aged 79) Portland, Oregon
- Education: University of North Dakota

Guy Carleton Haynes Corliss (July 4, 1858 – November 24, 1937) was an American judge who was one of the first three justices of the Supreme Court of North Dakota from 1889 to 1898.

== Early life and education ==
He was born in Poughkeepsie, New York on July 4, 1858. He attended elementary school in Poughkeepsie and later graduated Poughkeepsie High School at the age of 14 in 1873. Afterwards, he clerked in a store while studying law at the office of Poughkeepsie attorney J. S. Van Cleef.

== Career ==
Corliss was admitted to the New York Bar in September 1879 at the age of 21. He practied law in New York until he moved to Grand Forks, Dakota Territory in 1883. In Grand Forks, he practiced law in partnership with J. H. Bosard until the fall of 1889 when he was elected at the age of 31 to serve as a judge of the North Dakota Supreme Court and became the first chief justice. He was then nominated for reelection in 1892, running with no opposition. He served on the court for eight years and eight months, resigning on August 15, 1898.

After retiring from the court, Corliss returned to Grand Forks to practice law. He also organized the University of North Dakota School of Law alongside the university's president, Webster Merrifield and served as the inaugural dean of the law school from 1889 until 1902. He then returned to legal practice, but remained a part-time professor of law until moving out of the state of North Dakota in 1912.

In 1930, Corliss received a Doctor of Laws degree from the University of North Dakota.

== Legacy ==
The Phi Alpha Delta legal fraternity chapter at the law school was named the Guy C.H. Corliss Chapter upon being founded.

== Family ==
He married Miss Effie V. Edson of Clifton Springs, New York on April 6, 1883, and had four children. His grandson, Kenneth Corliss, won a bronze star in World War II.

== Death ==
He died in Portland, Oregon in on November 24, 1937, at the age of 79.
