= Daniel J. Crothers =

American judge (born 1957)

Daniel Crothers

Justice of the North Dakota Supreme Court
- In office July 2005 – February 28, 2026
- Appointed by: John Hoeven
- Preceded by: William A. Neumann
- Succeeded by: Mark Friese

Personal details
- Born: Daniel John Crothers; January 3, 1957 (age 69) Fargo, North Dakota, U.S.
- Education: University of North Dakota (BA, JD)

Daniel John Crothers (born January 3, 1957) is an American lawyer and jurist who served as a justice of the North Dakota Supreme Court.

== Early life ==
Crothers was born in Fargo, North Dakota, in 1957. Crothers was raised in West Fargo, American Samoa, and Albuquerque, New Mexico. After graduating from Eldorado High School, he earned a bachelor's degree from the University of North Dakota in 1979 and a Juris Doctor from the University of North Dakota School of Law in 1982.

== Career ==
In 1982 and 1983, Crothers served as a law clerk for Ramon Lopez of the New Mexico Court of Appeals. He also operated a private legal practice in Santa Fe, New Mexico, and Fargo, North Dakota. On June 10, 2005, Governor John Hoeven appointed Crothers to the North Dakota Supreme Court to fill William A. Neumann's seat, which Crothers took up the next month. He was elected to an unexpired four-year term in 2008 and re-elected to a ten-year term in 2012. In 2022, Crothers was re-elected, pledging that the term would be his last.

Crothers was president of the State Bar Association of North Dakota from 2001 to 2002. He is also a member of North Dakota's Committee on Judiciary Standards and chairs the North Dakota Court Services Administration Committee. He is a member of the ABA Center for Professional Responsibility Policy Implementation Committee. Crothers was formerly chair of the ABA Standing Committee on Client Protection.

Crothers was appointed to the North Dakota Supreme Court in 2005 and retired in February 2026.

Legal offices
Preceded by William A. Neumann	Justice of the North Dakota Supreme Court; 2005–2026	Succeeded by Mark Friese
