= Vernon R. Pederson =

American judge

Justice of the North Dakota Supreme Court
- In office 1974 – January 7, 1985
- Preceded by: Harvey B. Knudson
- Succeeded by: Beryl J. Levine

Surrogate Judge of the North Dakota Supreme Court
- In office 1985–1999

Chairman of the North Dakota State Deferred Compensation Committee
- In office 1972–1975

Personal details
- Born: September 11, 1919 Ward County, North Dakota
- Died: February 26, 2018 (aged 98) Lakeville, Minnesota
- Education: University of North Dakota (B.S., LL.B., and J.D.)

Vernon R. Pederson (September 11, 1919 – February 26, 2017) was an American attorney who served as a Justice on the North Dakota Supreme Court. He also served in a number of other government roles during his career.

== Early life and education ==
Pederson was born on September 11, 1919, on a farm in Ward County, North Dakota, near to Deering, North Dakota.

Pederson attended Minot State Teacher's College for two years. Following World War II, he earned his B.S., LL.B., and J.D. degrees at the University of North Dakota.

== Early career ==
Beginning in 1949, Pederson practiced law in Minot, North Dakota. He also began serving in various government roles while in Minot. He served a tenure as Minot City Justice. In 1951 and 1952, he spent two years serving as a special agent-attorney of North Dakota's Office of Price Stabilization (located in Fargo). On June 15, 1953, he was appointed a special assistant attorney general for North Dakota's State Highway Department and State Game and Fish Department. From 1966 to 1972, he was a member of North Dakota's original State Employee Retirement Board (PERS). From 1972 through 1975, he served as chairmen of North Dakota's inaugural State Deferred Compensation Committee.

== North Dakota Supreme Court ==
In 1974 Pederson was elected to the North Dakota Supreme Court. He was reelected in 1980. He retired from the court on January 7, 1985, after serving for ten years. During his tenure as a justice, Pederson served in a number of additional roles. This included serving in 1975 as the chairman of the Management Information System, which was responsible for designing the original computerization of the state's court records. He served as a representative of the state's judiciary as a director of the North Dakota Community Foundation from 1976 until 1983. He was also the inaugural chairman of the Judicial Planning Committee, which was formed in 1976.He served as chairman of the Supreme Court Personnel Advisory Board from 1982 until 1984.

From 1985 until 1999, Pederson served as a surrogate judge of the North Dakota Supreme Court.

== Personal life and death ==
In 1952, Pederson married Evelyn Kraby (1918–2007). Together they had children. His wife died in 2007 in Fargo, North Dakota. He died in on February 26, 2017, in Lakeville, Minnesota, at the age of 97.
