= James Robinson (North Dakota judge) =

American judge (1842–1933)

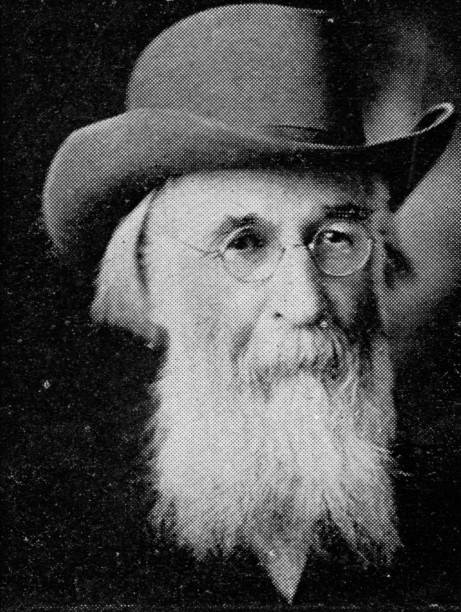

Chief Justice of North Dakota
- In office 1921
- Preceded by: Adolph M. Christianson
- Succeeded by: Richard Grace

Justice of the North Dakota Supreme Court
- In office 1917–1922
- Preceded by: Edward T. Burke
- Succeeded by: Sveinbjorn Johnson

District Attorney of Trempealeau County, Wisconsin

Personal details
- Born: May 11, 1842
- Died: March 22, 1933 (aged 90)
- Education: Michigan State University College of Law

James Robinson (May 11, 1843 – March 22, 1933) was a justice of the North Dakota Supreme Court from 1917 to 1922.

== Biography ==
=== Early years ===
Born in Michigan, Robinson began his education in Canada, where he taught school for a short time.

He enlisted in the Union Army and served during the Civil War.

=== Legal career ===
Robinson graduated from the Michigan State University College of Law on March 5, 1868, and thereafter engaged in the private practice of law in Wisconsin until 1883, during which time he also served a term as District Attorney of Trempealeau County.

Robinson then moved to Fargo, Dakota Territory, in 1882 where he resumed his private practice until 1916, when, at the age of 73, he was elected to a six-year term on the North Dakota Supreme Court.

While serving as a Justice, he wrote a weekly "Saturday Evening Letter" column about the work of the court for the Bismarck Tribune. He had an opposition to the doctrine of precedent and stare decisis, which attracted criticism upon his practice.

He became Chief Justice of North Dakota in 1921, but was defeated in a reelection attempt in 1922.

=== Later years ===
He then returned to the practice of law until poor health forced his retirement, in 1931. In 1923, Robinson published a book entitled Wrongs and Remedies. In 1931, he moved into a National Soldiers Home in Milwaukee, Wisconsin, and remained there until his death in 1933.
