= Robert Vogel =

Robert Vogel may refer to:

- Robert Vogel (judge) (1918–2005), justice on the North Dakota Supreme Court
- Robert Vogel (marksman) (born 1981), American professional shooter and champion

== See also ==
- Bob Vogel (disambiguation)
