= William Paulson =

William Paulson may refer to:

- William Paulson (judge)
- William Paulson (runner)
