= Alfred Wallin =

American judge (1836–1923)

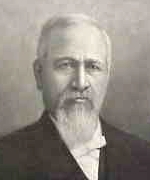

Chief Justice of North Dakota
- In office 1901–1903
- Preceded by: Joseph Bartholomew
- Succeeded by: Newton C. Young
- In office 1894–1896
- Preceded by: Joseph Bartholomew
- Succeeded by: Guy C. H. Corliss

Justice of the North Dakota Supreme Court
- In office 1889–1902
- Preceded by: Seat established
- Succeeded by: John M. Cochrane

County Attorney of Nicollet County, Minnesota

County Attorney of Redwood County, Minnesota

Personal details
- Born: February 12, 1836 New York
- Died: January 9, 1923 (aged 86) Santa Monica, California

Alfred Wallin (February 12, 1836 – January 9, 1923) was an American judge who served one of the first three justices of the Supreme Court of North Dakota from 1889 to 1902.

== Background ==
Wallin was born in Gilbertsville New York on February 212, 1836. His family lived in Michigan for several years and moved to Chicago, Illinois in 1851. Wallin's father and two eldest brothers brought a tannery and formed the company of C.C. Wallin & Sons, Manufacturers and Dealers in Leather. Wallin apprenticed as a tanner and currier in the family business.

Wallin received his legal education at the University of Michigan Law School and was admitted to the Michigan Bar and the Illinois Bar in 1862. He served in the United States Army during the American Civil War in 1861 and 1862, reenlisted in 1864, and was mustered out in 1865.

== Career ==
After the war, he moved to Minnesota and practiced law in St. Peter and then in Redwood County. He held the office of County Attorney in both Nicollet County and Redwood County. In 1883, he moved to Fargo, Dakota Territory, and practiced law until he was elected as one of the first three justices of the North Dakota Supreme Court at the age of 53. He was elected to a seven-year term and was reelected in 1896. Wallin declined renomination and retired at the end of his term on December 31, 1902, after having served roughly thirteen years and one month. After leaving the court, due to increasing deafness, Wallin did not resume his practice of law.

== Personal life ==
Alfred Wallin and Ellen Gray Keyes were married on January 1, 1868, in Elgin, Illinois. While living in St. Peter, Minnesota the couple had two children. A daughter, Madeleine, was born on October 12, 1868, and a son died in infancy. Wallin died at the age 86 in Santa Monica, California on January 9, 1923.
