= Senator Knudson =

Senator Knudson may refer to:

- Dave Knudson (politician) (born 1950), South Dakota State Senate
- Harvey B. Knudson (1903–1978), North Dakota State Senate
- Norman Knudson (1874–1934), Wisconsin State Senate
- Peter C. Knudson (born 1937), Utah State Senate

== See also ==
- Senator Knutson (disambiguation)
