= Harvey B. Knudson =

American judge

Harvey Knudson

Justice of the North Dakota Supreme Court
- In office 1965–1975
- Preceded by: James Morris
- Succeeded by: Vernon R. Pederson

Member of the North Dakota Senate
- In office 1951–1959

Member of the North Dakota House of Representatives
- In office 1937–1939

Personal details
- Born: June 26, 1903 Finley, North Dakota, U.S.
- Died: June 29, 1978 (aged 75)
- Education: University of North Dakota (LLB)

Harvey B. Knudson (June 26, 1903 – June 29, 1978) was an American attorney, jurist, and politician who served as a justice of the North Dakota Supreme Court from 1965 to 1975 and served in both chambers of the North Dakota Legislative Assembly.

== Early life and education ==
Knudson was born in Finley, North Dakota, on June 26, 1903. He attended elementary school and high school in Finley. He received his law degree from the University of North Dakota School of Law in 1931

== Career ==
After graduating from law school, Knudson established a legal practice in Finley, where he remained until 1937. In 1937, he moved to Mayville, where he practiced law until being elected to the North Dakota Supreme Court in 1964. While practicing law in Mayville, Knudson served in the North Dakota House of Representatives from 1937 to 1939 and in the North Dakota Senate from 1951 to 1959.

In 1964, at the age of 61, Knudson was elected to the North Dakota Supreme Court. He served on the court for ten years before retiring in 1975.

Knudson died at the age of 75 on June 29, 1978.
