= Edward Engerud =

American judge (1868–1921)

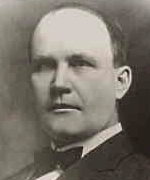

Justice of the North Dakota Supreme Court
- In office 1904–1907
- Preceded by: John M. Cochrane
- Succeeded by: Burleigh F. Spalding

State's Attorney of Cass County, North Dakota
- In office 1898–1900

State's Attorney of Ransom County, North Dakota
- In office 1893–1895

Personal details
- Born: February 13, 1868 Racine, Wisconsin
- Died: January 8, 1921 (aged 52)

Edward Engerud (February 13, 1868 – January 8, 1921) was an American attorney who served as a justice of the Supreme Court of North Dakota from 1904 to 1907 and the state's attorney of both Cass County, North Dakota, and Ransom County, North Dakota.

== Early life and education ==
Engerud was born in Racine, Wisconsin. He was the son of Lars Engerud and Christine (Bakke) Engerud, natives of Norway, who came to America in 1852. In 1881 he moved to Fergus Falls, Minnesota. In 1882, he moved to Grand Forks, Dakota Territory where he studied law for a year before returning to Fegus Falls and resuming studies at a law office there.

== Career ==
In 1889, at the age of 21, he was admitted to the Minnesota Bar. He practiced law in Fergus Falls for four years before moving to North Dakota.

In 1893, Engerud moved to Lisbon, North Dakota, and served as state's attorney of Ransom County for two years. In 1895 he moved to Fargo, North Dakota. In 1897, he was elected state's attorney of Cass County, North Dakota, holding that office until 1900.

On August 9, 1904, he was appointed to fill the remainder of the North Dakota Supreme Court term of the seat left vacant by John M. Cochrane's death in office. He resigned from the court on January 10, 1907, after serving for roughly two years and five months.

After resigning from the court, he returned to private legal practice in Fargo. In 1910 he was appointed assistant United States district attorney, a position he held until 1914. He died of an unexpected heart attack on January 8, 1921, at the age of 52.
