= Burleigh F. Spalding =

American judge (1853–1934)

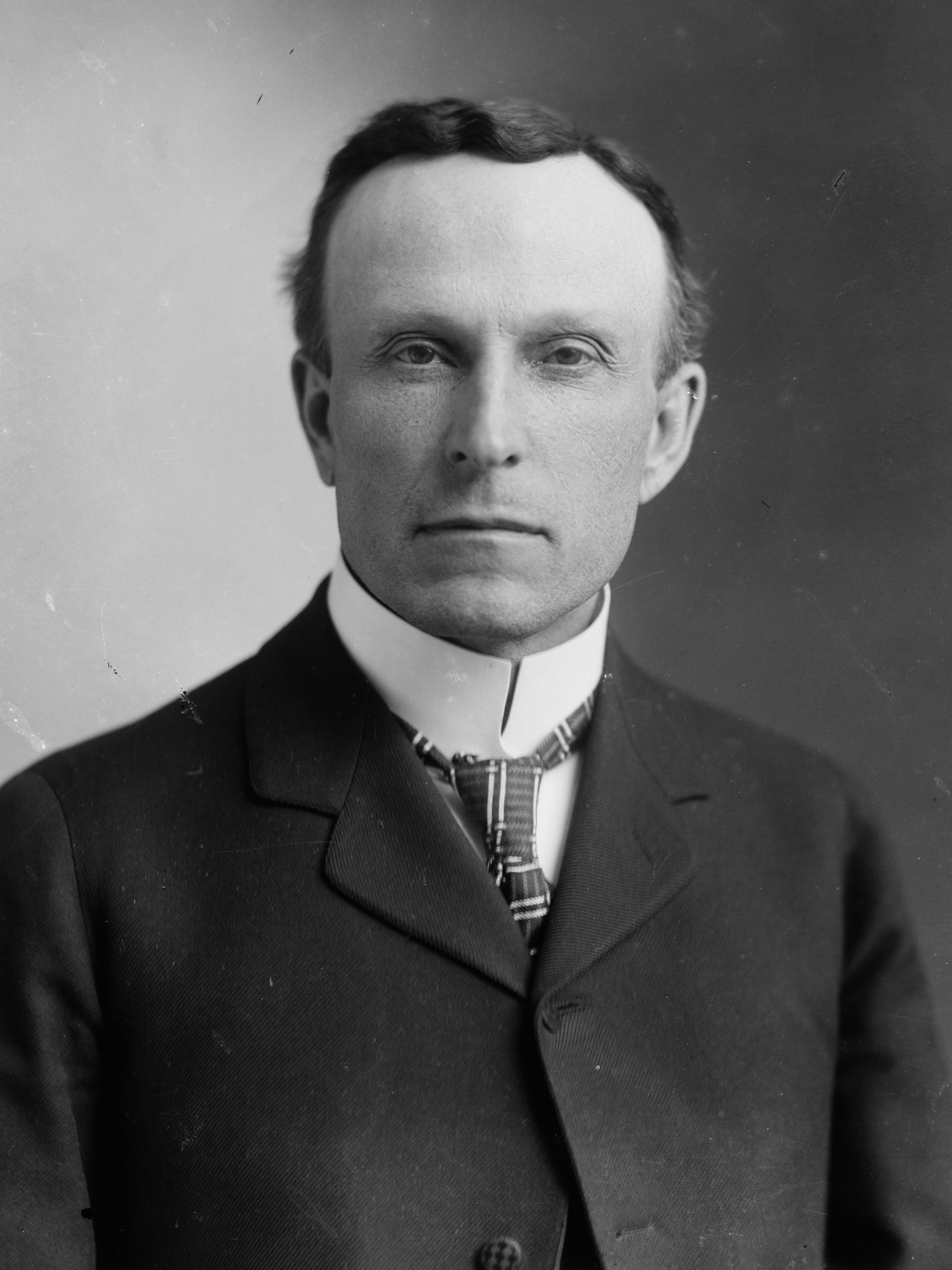
- Spalding c. 1894–1901

Chief Justice of North Dakota
- In office 1911–1915
- Preceded by: David Morgan
- Succeeded by: Charles Joseph Fisk

Justice of the North Dakota Supreme Court
- In office 1907–1914
- Preceded by: Edward Engerud
- Succeeded by: Adolph M. Christianson

Member of the U.S. House of Representatives from North Dakota's at-large district
- In office March 4, 1903 – March 3, 1905
- Preceded by: District established
- Succeeded by: Asle Gronna
- In office March 4, 1899 – March 3, 1901
- Preceded by: Martin N. Johnson
- Succeeded by: Thomas Frank Marshall

Personal details
- Born: December 3, 1853 Craftsbury, Vermont, US
- Died: March 17, 1934 (aged 80) Fargo, North Dakota, US
- Party: Republican
- Profession: Lawyer

Burleigh Folsom Spalding (December 3, 1853 – March 17, 1934) was a United States representative from North Dakota. He was born on a farm near Craftsbury, Vermont. He attended the Lyndon Literary Institute in Lyndon, Vermont and was graduated from Norwich University, Northfield, Vermont in 1877. He studied law in Montpelier, Vermont and was admitted to the bar in 1880.

In March 1880, he relocated to Fargo, North Dakota and commenced practice there. In 1882–1884, he was superintendent of public instruction of Cass County, North Dakota. On November 25, 1880, Burleigh F. Spalding married Alida Baker of Vermont.

Spalding was a member of the commission to relocate the capital of the Territory of Dakota and build the capitol in 1883 and a member of the North Dakota constitutional convention in 1889. He was the chairman of the Republican State central committee of North Dakota 1892–1894 and of the Cass County Republican committee 1896–1898.

He was elected as a Republican to the Fifty-sixth Congress (March 4, 1899 – March 3, 1901) and did not seek renomination in 1900. He was elected to the Fifty-eighth Congress (March 4, 1903 – March 3, 1905) and was an unsuccessful candidate for renomination in 1904.

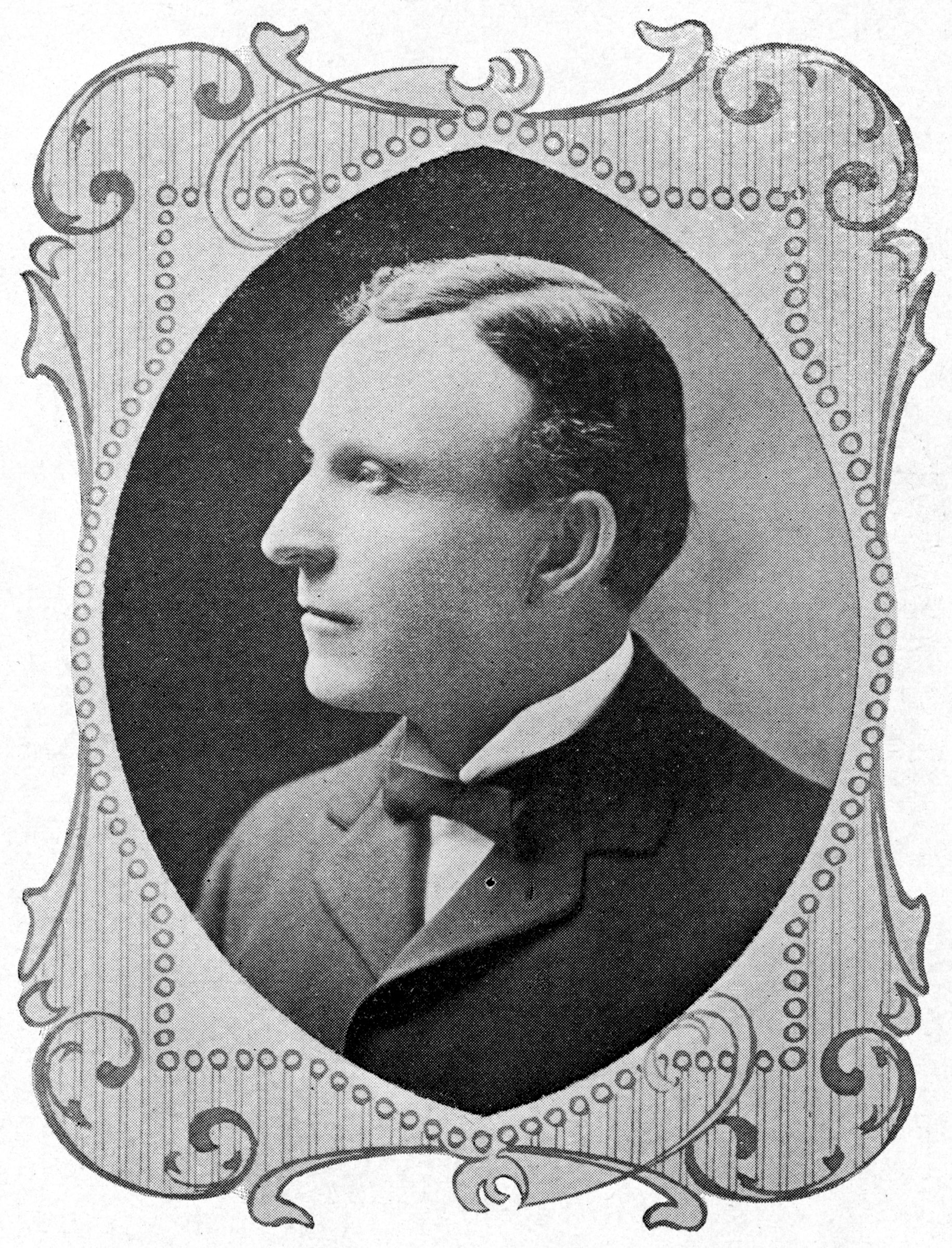
Burleigh F. Spalding, U.S. Representative from North Dakota, 1899

He was appointed in 1907 and elected in 1908 an associate justice of the North Dakota Supreme Court and became chief justice in 1911 and served until 1915 after which he resumed the practice of law in Fargo, North Dakota in 1915.

He served as a delegate to most Republican Territorial and State conventions 1888–1933 and as a delegate to the Republican National Convention in 1924.

He died in Fargo, North Dakota in 1934 and was buried in Riverside Cemetery.

U.S. House of Representatives
Preceded by Martin N. Johnson	Member of the U.S. House of Representatives from North Dakota's at-large congressional district March 4, 1899 – March 3, 1901	Succeeded by Thomas Frank Marshall
Preceded by None: new seat added	Member of the U.S. House of Representatives from North Dakota's at-large congressional district March 4, 1903 – March 3, 1905	Succeeded by Asle Gronna
Legal offices
Preceded by David Morgan	Chief Justice of North Dakota; 1911–1915	Succeeded by Charles Joseph Fisk
