= Thomas F. Marshall (North Dakota politician) =

American politician (1854–1921)

Thomas Frank Marshall
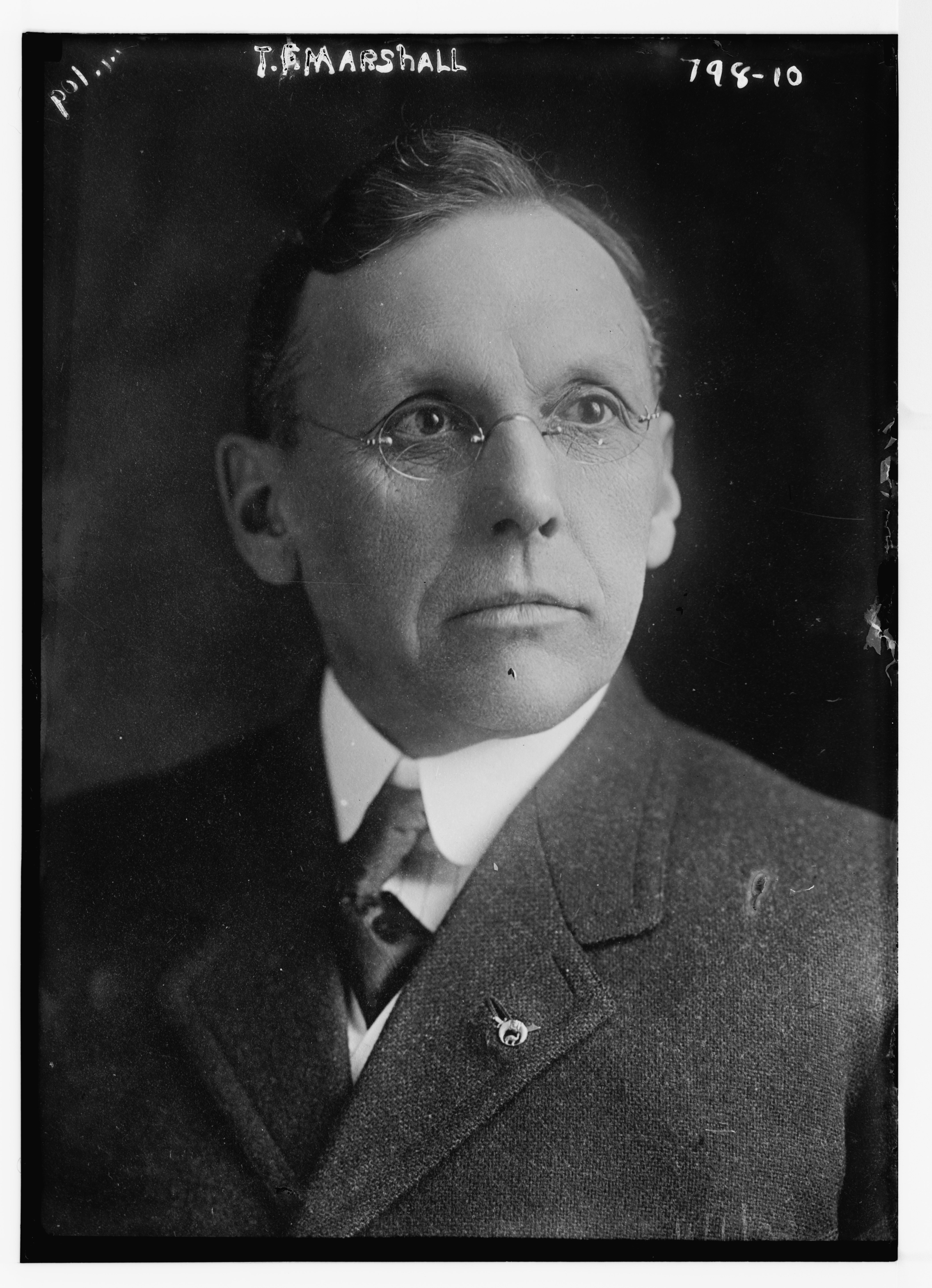

Member of the U.S. House of Representatives from North Dakota's at-large district
- In office March 4, 1901 – March 3, 1909 Serving with Burleigh F. Spalding (1903–1905) and Asle Gronna (1905–1909)
- Preceded by: Burleigh F. Spalding
- Succeeded by: L. B. Hanna

Member of the North Dakota Senate
- In office 1896–1900

Personal details
- Born: March 7, 1854 Hannibal, Missouri, U.S.
- Died: August 20, 1921 (aged 67) Detroit Lakes, Minnesota, U.S.
- Party: Republican
- Profession: banker

Thomas Frank Marshall (March 7, 1854 – August 20, 1921) was a U.S. representative from North Dakota.

== Biography ==
Born in Hannibal, Missouri, Marshall attended the common schools and the State normal school at Platteville, Wisconsin. He left school in 1873 two months before graduation, but received his diploma forty years later. He became a surveyor. He moved to Yankton, Dak. (now South Dakota), in 1873 and engaged in mercantile pursuits. He moved to Columbia, Dak. (now North Dakota), in 1882 and engaged in banking. He moved in 1886 to Oakes, Dak. (now North Dakota), where he engaged in banking and surveying. He served as mayor 1888–1892. He served as a member of the North Dakota State Senate from 1896 to 1900. He served as a delegate to the Republican National Convention in 1892.

Marshall was elected as a Republican to the Fifty-seventh and to the three succeeding Congresses (March 4, 1901 – March 3, 1909). He served as chairman of the Committee on Private Land Claims (Sixtieth Congress). He was not a candidate for renomination in 1908, but was an unsuccessful candidate for the United States Senate. He again engaged in banking. He died at his summer home in Detroit (now Detroit Lakes), Becker County, Minnesota, August 20, 1921. He was interred in Oakesview Cemetery, Oakes, Dickey County, N.Dak.

== Sources ==
- United States Congress. "Thomas F. Marshall (id: M000163)". Biographical Directory of the United States Congress.

U.S. House of Representatives
Preceded by Burleigh F. Spalding	Member of the U.S. House of Representatives from North Dakota's at-large congressional district 1901–1909	Succeeded by L. B. Hanna
