= Gerald W. VandeWalle =

American judge

Gerald VandeWalle
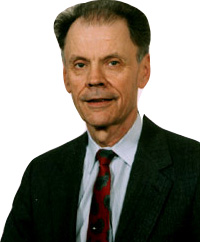

Chief Justice of the North Dakota Supreme Court
- In office January 1, 1993 – December 31, 2019
- Preceded by: Ralph J. Erickstad
- Succeeded by: Jon J. Jensen

Justice of the North Dakota Supreme Court
- In office August 15, 1978 – January 31, 2023
- Appointed by: Arthur A. Link
- Preceded by: Robert Vogel
- Succeeded by: Douglas Bahr

President of the Conference of Chief Justices
- In office 2000–2001
- Preceded by: E. Norman Veasey
- Succeeded by: Annice M. Wagner

Personal details
- Born: August 15, 1933 (age 93) Noonan, North Dakota, U.S.
- Education: University of North Dakota (BS, JD)

Gerald Wayne VandeWalle (born August 15, 1933) is an American lawyer who served as a justice of the North Dakota Supreme Court from 1978 to 2023. He served as the court's chief justice from 1993 to 2019.

== Early life and education ==
VandeWalle was born in Noonan, North Dakota and attended the University of North Dakota where he elected to the Phi Eta Sigma, Beta Alpha Psi, and Beta Gamma Sigma honor societies and was a member of the Lambda Chi Alpha social fraternity, graduating in 1955 with a Bachelor of Science degree in commerce. He then attended the University of North Dakota School of Law where he was a member of the Order of the Coif and Phi Alpha Delta, graduating with a JD Magna Cum Laude in 1958.

== Career ==
VandeWalle was admitted to the State Bar of North Dakota in 1958, and served as a Special Assistant Attorney General from 1958 until being appointed First Assistant Attorney General of North Dakota in 1975. VandeWalle was appointed to serve on the North Dakota Supreme court in August 1978 and was elected to serve an unexpired term in November of the same year before being re-elected to the court in 1994, 2004, and 2014. He was elected Chief Justice of the North Dakota Supreme Court in 1993, and was re-elected to the office in 1995, 2000, 2005, 2010, and 2015.

VandeWalle served as Chair of the North Dakota Judicial conference from 1985–1987, President of the Conference of Chief Justices from 2000–2001, Chair of the Section on Legal Education and Admissions to the Bar of the American Bar Association. He also served on the Federal/State Jurisdiction Committee of the Judicial Conference of the United States and as a delegate to the ABA House of Delegates.

In late 2019, VandeWalle announced he would not seek reelection for another term as chief justice, but would remain on the court. He was the longest-serving chief justice in North Dakota history and at the time, the oldest in the nation. He retired from the court on January 31, 2023.

Legal offices
Preceded by Robert Vogel	Justice of the North Dakota Supreme Court; 1978–2023	Succeeded by Douglas Bahr
Preceded by Ralph J. Erickstad	Chief Justice of the North Dakota Supreme Court; 1993–2019	Succeeded by Jon J. Jensen
