= Joseph Bartholomew (judge) =

19th century American judge

The Honorable Joseph Bartholomew
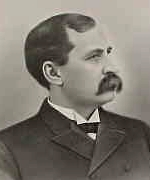

Chief Justice of North Dakota
- In office 1899–1901
- Preceded by: Guy C. H. Corliss
- Succeeded by: Alfred Wallin
- In office 1892–1894
- Preceded by: Guy C. H. Corliss
- Succeeded by: Alfred Wallin

Justice of the North Dakota Supreme Court
- In office November 2, 1889 – January 1, 1901
- Preceded by: Seat established
- Succeeded by: David Morgan

Personal details
- Born: June 17, 1843 Indiana, U.S.
- Died: March 24, 1901 (aged 57) Bismarck, North Dakota, U.S.
- Cause of death: Heart attack
- Resting place: Saint Marys Cemetery, Bismarck, North Dakota
- Spouses: Arvilla Bartholomew (died 1876); Mary Bartholomew
- Children: at least 1 daughter
- Parent: George M. Bartholomew (father)
- Relatives: Joseph Bartholomew (grandfather)

Military service
- Allegiance: United States
- Branch/service: United States Volunteers; Union Army
- Years of service: 1862–1865
- Rank: 1st Lieutenant, USV
- Unit: 23rd Reg. Wis. Vol. Infantry; 49th Reg. Wis. Vol. Infantry
- Battles/wars: American Civil War: Vicksburg Campaign; Battle of Chickasaw Bayou; Battle of Arkansas Post; Battle of Champion Hill; Battle of Big Black River Bridge; Operations in West Louisiana; Battle of Bayou Bourbeux; Red River campaign; Battle of Pleasant Hill; Battle of Monett's Ferry

Joseph Milton Bartholomew (June 17, 1843 – March 24, 1901) was an American lawyer and judge. He was one of the first three justices of the Supreme Court of North Dakota, serving from 1889 through 1900, and was the 2nd chief justice.

== Early life ==
Bartholomew was the grandson of American major general Joseph Bartholomew, who had settled in Indiana after the War of 1812. Joseph Milton Bartholomew was born in Indiana in June 1843. His parents moved the family to Columbia County, Wisconsin Territory, in 1845, and settled a farm.

He entered the University of Wisconsin–Madison in 1861, but quit in 1862 to volunteer for duty in the American Civil War.

== Civil War service ==
Bartholomew was mustered into federal service in Company H of the 23rd Wisconsin Infantry Regiment. The 23rd Wisconsin Infantry served in the western theater of the war. After drilling in southern Ohio and Kentucky, they set off on the Vicksburg Campaign with General William Tecumseh Sherman, where they were actively engaged through the fall of Vicksburg in July 1863, participating in many of the skirmishes around the siege to prevent supplies from reaching the besieged Confederate city.

After the fall of Vicksburg, they participated in the expedition into Louisiana, and fought at the Battle of Bayou Bourbeux. They spent the rest of the Winter on provost duty at New Iberia, Louisiana, except for a brief reconnaissance expedition into Texas.

In March 1864, they joined the Red River campaign, seeking to consolidate Union control over Louisiana and Arkansas. Returning to Mississippi in May, they spent most of the rest of the year engaged in anti-guerilla activity in Mississippi and Alabama. Bartholomew later recounted that during this time he cast the first vote of his life for Abraham Lincoln in an empty cartridge box in the field.

Through his two years on campaign, Bartholomew had risen from private to corporal to sergeant. In February 1865, he received a commission as 2nd lieutenant of Company I in the newly-raised 49th Wisconsin Infantry Regiment. He left the 23rd Wisconsin Infantry and went to meet the new regiment at Rolla, Missouri, where they remained on guard duty protecting supply lines. While there, he was promoted to 1st lieutenant, which was his rank when the regiment mustered out of service in November 1865.

== Postwar career ==
After the war, he resumed his studies and read law in the office of William B. Allison, in Dubuque, Iowa. There he was admitted to the bar in 1869 and engaged in a successful legal practice for the next decade.

In 1883, he planned to move to Bismarck, which had just become the capital of the Dakota Territory, but instead settled at LaMoure and became a leading attorney in the region. At the August 1889 Republican convention anticipating the first elections of the new state of North Dakota, Bartholomew was selected as one of their nominees for the North Dakota Supreme Court. He was elected to a five year term and was subsequently re-elected to a six year term in 1894. He retired at the end of that term, in January 1901.

He died of a sudden heart attack while clearing snow from his sidewalk just two months later, on March 24, 1901, aged 57 years.

== Family ==
Bartholomew was named for his paternal grandfather Joseph Bartholomew, who had volunteered for service in the American Revolutionary War at only ten years old and rose to the rank of major general after distinguishing himself in the War of 1812.

His father, George McNaught Bartholomew, was one of the founders of Lodi, Wisconsin, and served one term in the Wisconsin State Assembly in 1857.

Legal offices
New state government	Justice of the North Dakota Supreme Court; November 2, 1889 – January 1, 1901	Succeeded by David Morgan
Preceded by Guy C. H. Corliss	Chief Justice of the North Dakota Supreme Court; January 1, 1892 – January 1, 1894	Succeeded by Alfred Wallin
