= William Paulson (judge) =

American judge

William S. Murray

Justice of the North Dakota Supreme Court
- In office 1966–1983
- Preceded by: William S. Murray
- Succeeded by: H. F. Gierke III

Surrogate Judge of the North Dakota Supreme Court
- In office 1983–2000

State's Attorney of Barnes County, North Dakota
- In office 1959–1966
- In office 1941–1950

Personal details
- Born: September 3, 1913; Valley City, North Dakota, U.S.
- Died: June 16, 2000 (aged 86)
- Education: University of North Dakota (LLB, JD)

William Lee Paulson (September 3, 1913 – June 16, 2000) was a justice on the North Dakota Supreme Court from 1966 to 1983. He was born in Valley City, North Dakota.

== Early life and education ==
Paulson was born September 3, 1913, in Valley City North Dakota, to Alfred P. and Igna G. Paulson. In 1931, Paulson graduated from Valley City High School. In 1935, he graduated with a Bachelor of Laws in 1935 and with a Juris Doctor in 1937.

== Career ==
Paulson served as the state's attorney of Barnes County, North Dakota, from 1941 until 1950 and again from 1959 until 1966. In 1964, Paulson served a president of the State's Attorney Association. He also served and the director of the National District Attorney's Association from 1963 until 1965. During this time, he was also chancellor of the Episcopal Church of North Dakota in 1965, district vice-president of U.S. Jaycees in 1945 and 1946.

In 1966, Paulson was elected to a justice of the North Dakota Supreme Court. He was reelected in 1976. He resigned on September 5, 1983. He thereafter became a surrogate judge of the court until 2000.

Paulson also served as director of the Valley City Chamber of Commerce at one point. Paulson was a judge on the National Awards Jury of Freedoms Foundation at Valley Forge, Pennsylvania, in the years 1969, 1971, and 1977. He also served as a judge of the American Legion Oratorical Contest in both 1970 and 1972.

== Personal life and death ==
Paulson married James E. "Betty" Graves in 1938. Together they had two children.

Paulson was a Freemason, a Shriner, as well as a member of the Judicare Society, Benevolent and Protective Order of Elks, and the Fraternal Order of Eagles. He served as a chancellor of the Knights of Pythias.

Paulson died on June 16, 2000.
