= Herbert L. Meschke =

American judge

Herbert L. Meschke (March 18, 1928 – May 19, 2017) was an American politician and judge.

Born on a ranch near Medora, North Dakota, Meschke went to the Belfield, North Dakota High School. He then received his bachelor's degree from Jamestown College, in 1950, and his law degree from the University of Michigan Law School, in 1953. He practiced law in Minot, North Dakota. He was described as, "a veteran Minot lawyer when he was named to the state's high court in 1985 by Gov. George Sinner to fill a vacancy." Meschke served as a Justice on the North Dakota Supreme Court from 1985 to 1998. He served in the North Dakota House of Representatives from 1965 to 1966 and in the North Dakota Senate from 1967 to 1970 and also served as Senate Minority Leader. Meschke died on May 19, 2017, in his home near Minot.
