= 1908 North Dakota gubernatorial election =

- November 3, 1908
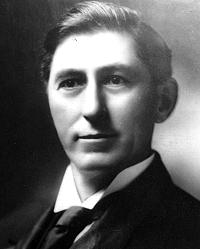

Nominee	John Burke	C. A. Johnson
Party	Democratic	Republican
Popular vote	49,398	46,849
Percentage	51.06%	48.43%
- County results Burke: 40–50% 50–60% 60–70% Johnson: 40–50% 50–60% 60–70% 70–80% 80–90%
Governor before election
John Burke
Democratic
Elected Governor
John Burke
Democratic

The 1908 North Dakota gubernatorial election was held on November 3, 1908. Incumbent Democrat John Burke defeated Republican nominee C. A. Johnson with 51.06% of the vote.

== Primary elections ==
Primary elections were held on June 24, 1908.

=== Democratic primary ===
==== Candidates ====
- John Burke, incumbent Governor

==== Results ====
Democratic primary results
Party	Candidate	Votes	%
Democratic	John Burke (inc.)	12,068	100.00
Total votes		12,068	100.00

=== Republican primary ===
==== Candidates ====
- C. A. Johnson
- T. Twichell

==== Results ====
Republican primary results
Party	Candidate	Votes	%
Republican	C. A. Johnson	39,169	62.30
Republican	T. Twichell	23,702	37.70
Total votes		62,871	100.00

== General election ==
=== Candidates ===
Major party candidates

- John Burke, Democratic
- C. A. Johnson, Republican

Other candidates

- L.F. Dow, Independent

=== Results ===
1908 North Dakota gubernatorial election
Party	Candidate	Votes	%	±%
Democratic	John Burke (inc.)	49,398	51.06%	▼2.14
Republican	C. A. Johnson	46,849	48.43%	▲3.14
Independent	L.F. Dow	490	0.51%	▼1.00
Majority		2,549	2.63	▼5.28
Total votes		96,737	100.00	
Democratic hold				
