= John Burke (North Dakota politician) =

American politician

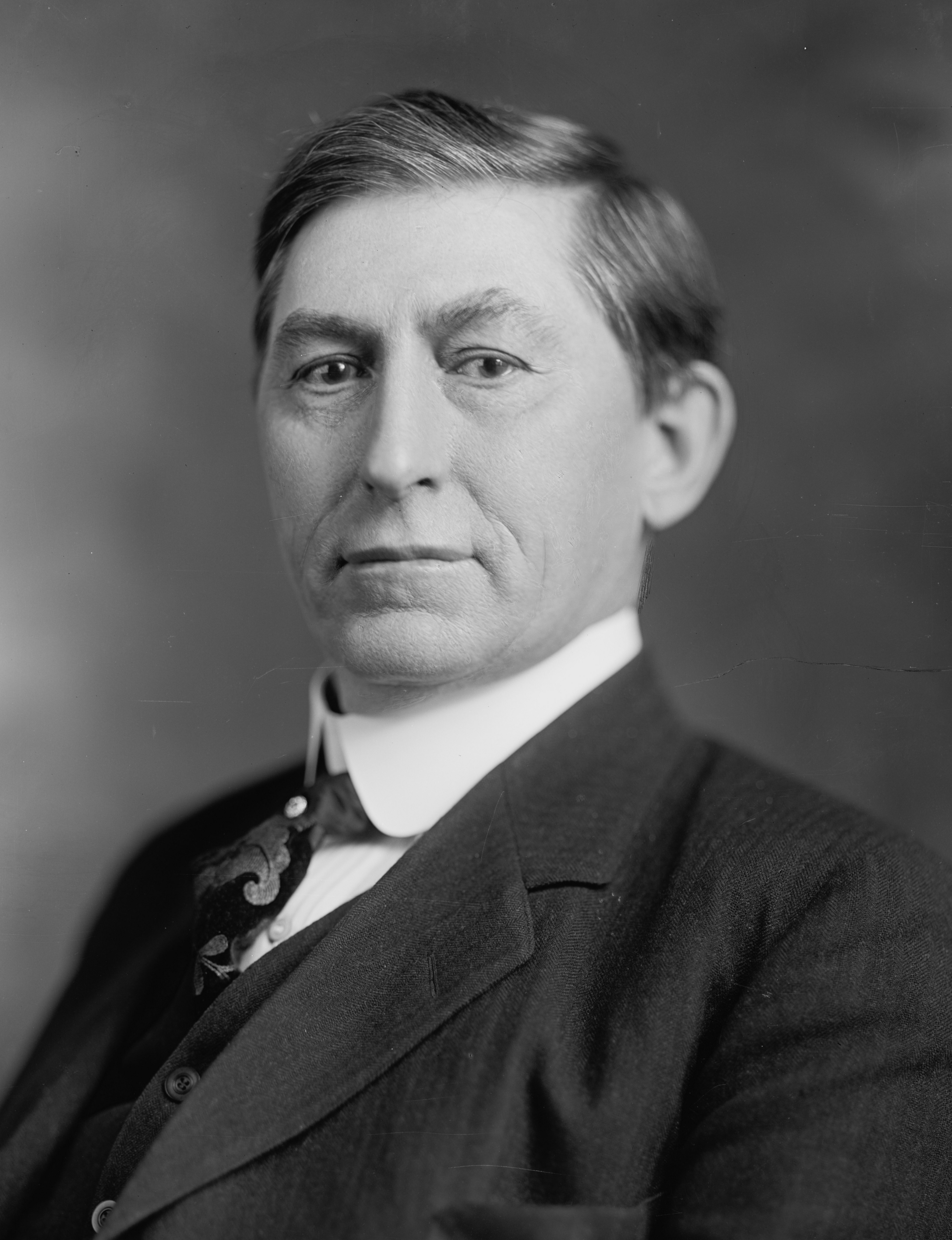
- Burke, c. 1920s

Chief Justice of the North Dakota Supreme Court
- In office 1929–1931
- Preceded by: William Nuessle
- Succeeded by: Adolph M. Christianson

Justice of the North Dakota Supreme Court
- In office 1924 – May 14, 1937
- Preceded by: Harrison A. Bronson
- Succeeded by: Peter O. Sathre

24th Treasurer of the United States
- In office April 1, 1913 – January 5, 1921
- President: Woodrow Wilson
- Preceded by: Carmi Thompson
- Succeeded by: Frank White

10th Governor of North Dakota
- In office January 9, 1907 – January 8, 1913
- Lieutenant: Robert S. Lewis (1907–1911); Usher L. Burdick (1911–1913)
- Preceded by: Elmore Y. Sarles
- Succeeded by: L. B. Hanna

Member of the North Dakota Senate
- In office 1893–1896

Member of the North Dakota House of Representatives
- In office 1891–1893

Personal details
- Born: February 25, 1859 Sigourney, Iowa, U.S.
- Died: May 14, 1937 (aged 78) Rochester, Minnesota, U.S.
- Resting place: St. Mary's Cemetery, Bismarck, North Dakota
- Party: Democratic
- Spouse: Mary Ellen Kane
- Children: 3
- Education: University of Iowa
- Profession: Lawyer
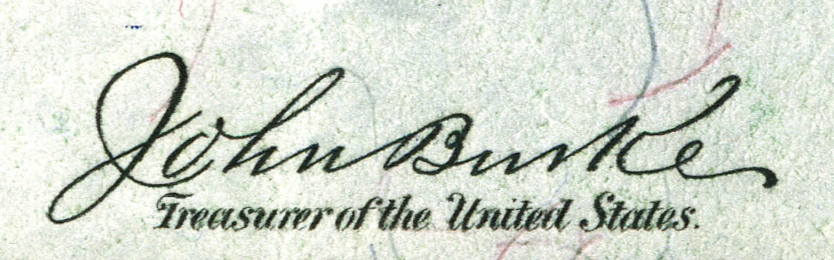
- Signature
- Nickname: Honest John

John Burke (February 25, 1859 – May 14, 1937) was an American lawyer, jurist, and political leader from North Dakota who served as the tenth governor of North Dakota from 1907 to 1913, and later served as the 24th treasurer of the United States under President Woodrow Wilson from 1913 to 1921. Following his term as treasurer, he subsequently served intermittently as Chief Justice of the North Dakota Supreme Court first from 1929 to 1931, then from 1935 until his death in 1937. He was the first Democrat to serve as Governor of North Dakota.

== Early life ==
Burke was born in Sigourney, Iowa of Irish ancestry to John and Mary (née Ryan) Burke. He graduated from the University of Iowa in 1886 with a law degree. He married Mary Ellen Kane, a teacher, on August 22, 1891, and they later had three children.

After establishing two separate practices of middling success in the late 1880s, Burke moved to the Dakota Territory poor in 1888 where he acquired work wherever he could before settling down in St. John in Rolette County.

== Career ==
Following his move to St. John, Burke began a legal practice and subsequently became a Rolette County judge in 1889.

Two years after the admission of North Dakota to the United States, Burke was elected to the North Dakota House of Representatives in 1891 and later served in the North Dakota Senate from 1893 to 1896. In 1896, Burke unsuccessfully sought election to the United States House of Representatives for the Democratic Party, losing by 4,000 votes. Following this, Burke returned to Rolette County, serving as a county judge for another term from 1897 to 1899.

After reluctantly accepting the nomination to run for governor of North Dakota by unanimous vote, Burke secured the Democratic gubernatorial nomination and ousted incumbent Elmore Sarles in what was called the 'Revolution of 1906', being the first step in the dismantling of Republican National committeeman Alexander McKenzie's political machine. Burke's campaign attracted wide bipartisan support, mostly those Republicans and other majority groups who had distaste for the incumbent Sarles administration, and the McKenzie political machine which had dominated the state for the previous 20 years. Following his taking of office, Burke, a new-era progressive, instituted and pursued policies against the railroad monopolists which had dominated state politics previously, and a number of reforms against corruption, which Burke personally despised and had crusaded against in all offices. His personality, political beliefs, and actions had garnered him the nickname 'Honest John', a name which Burke himself disliked, not wanting to be compared to President Abraham Lincoln, who was nicknamed 'Honest Abe' A number of reforms affecting working conditions were also carried out during his time as governor.

At the 1912 Democratic National Convention in Baltimore, Burke enthusiastically supported the candidacy of Woodrow Wilson. Burke swung all of North Dakota's votes to Wilson on the first ballot. William Jennings Bryan, himself a supporter of Wilson and also a good friend of Burke's, wanted Burke to run for vice president. Burke demurred, however, due to a promise he had given Indiana delegates for their votes. As a result, Thomas R. Marshall of Indiana was chosen instead for the vice presidency. Burke was named United States Treasurer following Wilson's election victory in November 1912. From 1913 to 1921, Burke was Treasurer of the United States under President Woodrow Wilson before he resigned two months prior to Wilson's leaving office to start a brokerage firm on Wall Street. During his term as treasurer, Burke ran unsuccessfully for the United States Senate in 1916.

Following his resignation from the treasury, Burke founded the Kardos & Burke brokerage firm with businessman Louis Montgomery Kardos Jr. on Wall Street. In 1924, the firm was made defunct after Kardos was found guilty of criminally defrauding investors in a bucket shop scheme. Burke was later exonerated of any association with the crimes, with his only personal investment being the loan which founded the firm. To please investigators, Burke sold all of his property and gave up a large amount of his wealth before moving back to Fargo, North Dakota.

He later served as a justice of the North Dakota Supreme Court, a position he had always desired, from 1924 to 1937. During this time he served as chief justice twice, from 1929 to 1931, and from 1935 to 1937.

== Death and legacy ==
In the midst of his second term as chief justice of the North Dakota Supreme Court, Burke developed a pulmonary edema. For the edema, he underwent an operation to relieve it, but died following the operation on May 14, 1937.

Following Burke's death, many politicians and officials mourned and remembered Burke for his character and ideals. By many, Burke is considered to be one of the greatest North Dakota politicians. During his lifetime, many called Burke a hero, as well as 'the first citizen of North Dakota'. His remains are interred in Saint Mary's Cemetery, Bismarck, North Dakota.

Burke County, North Dakota is named in honor of John Burke. The World War II ship SS John Burke was also named after Burke.

In 1963, the State of North Dakota donated a statue of Burke to the United States Capitol's National Statuary Hall Collection. A similar statue also stands on the grounds of the North Dakota State Capitol in Bismarck.

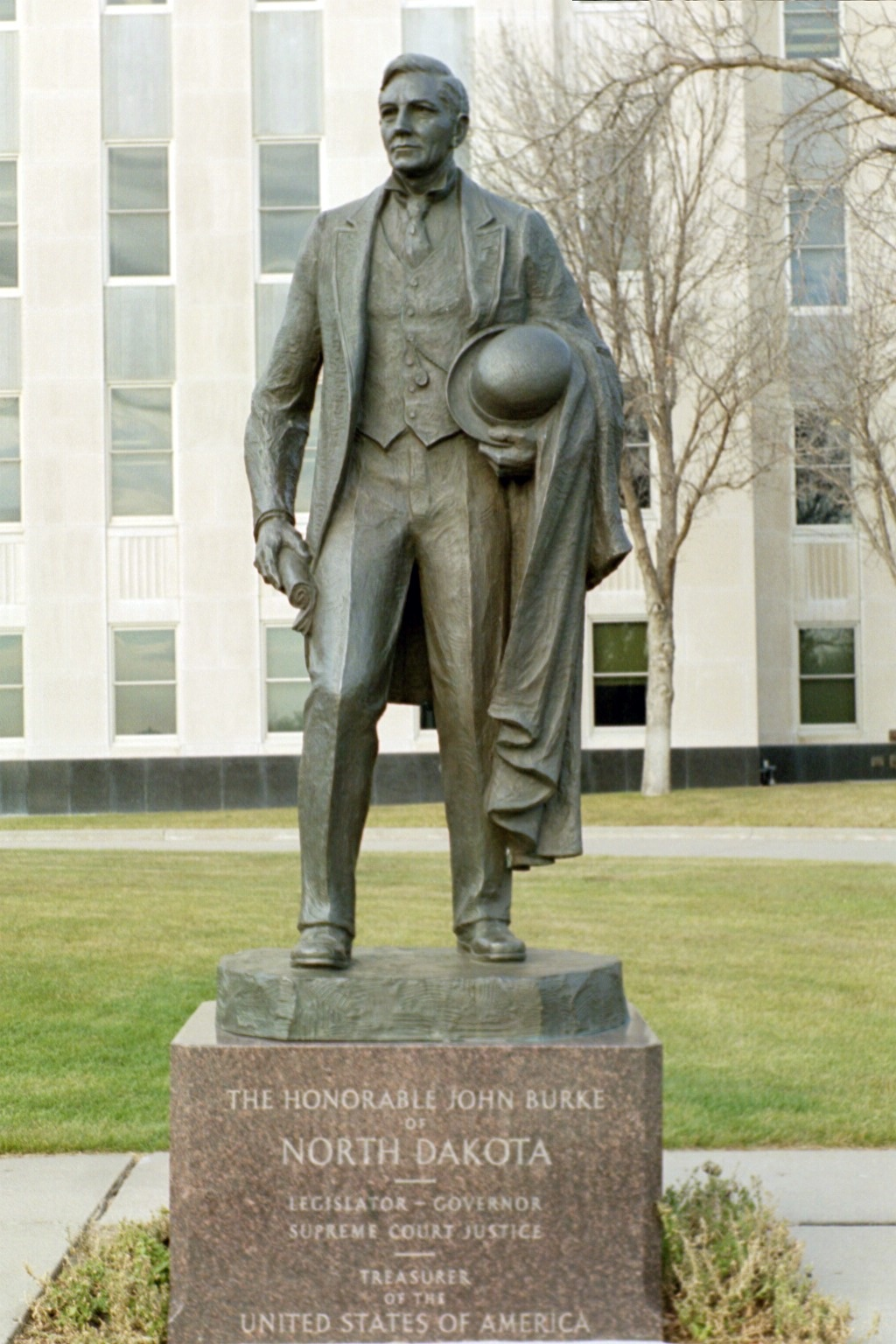
Statue of John Burke at the State Capitol grounds, Bismarck, ND

Party political offices
Preceded by Marthinus F. Hegge	Democratic nominee for Governor of North Dakota; 1906, 1908, 1910	Succeeded by Frank O. Hellstrom
First	Democratic nominee for U.S. Senator from North Dakota (Class 1); 1916	Succeeded by James Francis Thaddeus O'Connor
Political offices
Preceded by Carmi A. Thompson	Treasurer of the United States; April 1, 1913–January 5, 1921	Succeeded by Frank White
Preceded by Elmore Y. Sarles	Governor of North Dakota; 1907–1913	Succeeded by L. B. Hanna
Legal offices
Preceded by William Nuessle	Chief Justice of North Dakota; 1929–1931	Succeeded by Adolph M. Christianson
Preceded by Alexander Burr	Chief Justice of North Dakota; 1935–1937	Succeeded by Adolph M. Christianson
