= George Moellring =

American judge (1878–1935)

George Moellring (November 14, 1878 – May 31, 1935) was a justice of the North Dakota Supreme Court from December 1, 1933, to the end of 1934.

Born in Quincy, Illinois, Moellring studied law at Chaddock College of Law and Highland Park College, gaining admission to the bar in 1901. He moved to North Dakota the following year and in 1920 was elected to a seat on the District Court for the Fifth Judicial District, and was thereafter reelected to the seat. On December 1, 1933, he was appointed by Governor William Langer to a seat on the state supreme court vacated by the resignation of Justice Luther E. Birdzell. Moellring failed to win re-election to a full term in the 1934 election, and died the following year at the age of 56.
