= Sveinbjorn Johnson =

American lawyer and judge (1883–1946)

- Picture of Johnson printed in The Bismarck Tribune (1946)

12th Attorney General of North Dakota
- In office 1921–1922
- Preceded by: William Lemke
- Succeeded by: George F. Shafer

Personal details
- Born: July 10, 1883 Hólar, Iceland
- Died: March 16, 1946 (aged 62) Champaign, Illinois, U.S.
- Education: University of North Dakota

Sveinbjörn Johnson (July 10, 1883 – March 16, 1946) was an Icelandic-born American lawyer, politician and scholar.

== Biography ==
Johnson was born at Hólar in the Skagafjörður district of northern Iceland on July 10, 1883, the oldest of ten children born to John and Gudbjorn Johnson. He came to Dakota Territory with his parents in 1887 at the age of four. His family settled on a farm in Pembina County, North Dakota.

Johnson received his early education in the state's public schools, completing the combined seven-year high school and college course in four years. He then attended the University of North Dakota, where he received a Bachelor of Arts degree in 1906, a Master of Arts degree in 1907 and a law degree in 1908. He subsequently undertook graduate studies at the University of Wisconsin. Upon graduation from law school, Johnson went to Bismarck, North Dakota, where he organized the legislative reference library as an employee of the Public Library Commission.

== North Dakota legal career ==
In 1911 Johnson opened a law office in Cavalier, North Dakota. In 1913, he moved to Grand Forks, North Dakota to become a law partner of J. F. T. O'Connor. In 1913 and 1915, he assisted members of the state legislature in drafting bills. While overseeing his private practice, Johnson simultaneously lectured in Political Science and Law at the University of North Dakota. In 1916, Johnson ran for State's Attorney of Grand Forks County, but lost to the incumbent.

Following the recall of William Lemke, Johnson, after receiving the endorsement of the Independent Voters Association, was elected North Dakota Attorney General in 1921. In 1922 he was elected justice of the North Dakota Supreme Court, defeating the incumbent James Robinson.

On December 1, 1926, Johnson resigned from the North Dakota Supreme Court and became legal counsel and Professor of Law at the University of Illinois at Urbana-Champaign.

== Illinois legal career ==
Johnson became a professor of law at University of Illinois at Urbana-Champaign in 1926. In 1942, while serving as state director of the federal office of government reports, Johnson became involved in a heated controversy with Illinois Attorney General George F. Barrett over the matter of holding federal and state jobs at the same time.

Johnson resigned from the University of Illinois on September 1, 1944. He ran unsuccessfully against Barrett for the position of Illinois Attorney General in 1944. On January 1, 1945, he opened a law office in Chicago, practicing law in both Chicago and Champaign, Illinois.

Johnson suffered from a heart attack in his office and died on March 16, 1946. He was survived by his wife Esther Slette of Manchester, Minnesota and his son Paul, who served as a captain in the United States Army during World War II.

Johnson was the author of numerous books on law and history, particularly with regards to his native Iceland. He was a recipient of honorary Doctor of Laws degrees from the University of Iceland in 1930 and the University of North Dakota. In 1939 he was decorated a Knight of the Order of the Falcon by Christian X of Denmark.

== Selected works ==
- Pioneers of Freedom, 1930

Party political offices
| Preceded by William Lemke | Republican nominee for North Dakota Attorney General; 1921 | Succeeded by George F. Shafer |
| Preceded by Harold G. Ward | Democratic nominee for Attorney General of Illinois; 1944 | Succeeded by Ivan A. Elliott |
Legal offices
| Preceded by William Lemke | Attorney General of North Dakota; 1921–1922 | Succeeded by George F. Shafer |
