= Bob Vogel (disambiguation) =

Bob Vogel (born 1941) is an American former football player.

Bob Vogel may also refer to:

- Bob Vogel (politician) (born 1951), member of the Minnesota House of Representatives

== See also ==
- Robert Vogel (disambiguation)
