= Statue of John Burke =

Statue by Avard Fairbanks

John Burke
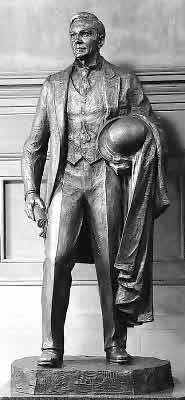
- The statue in the National Statuary Hall Collection
- Artist: Avard Fairbanks
- Medium: Bronze sculpture
- Subject: John Burke
- Location: Washington, D.C., United States

John Burke is a bronze sculpture depicting the American politician of the same name by Avard Fairbanks, installed at the United States Capitol's National Statuary Hall, in Washington, D.C., as part of the National Statuary Hall Collection. The statue was gifted by the U.S. state of North Dakota in 1963.

== See also ==
- 1963 in art
