= William A. Neumann =

American judge

William Allen Neumann (born February 11, 1944) was a Justice on the North Dakota Supreme Court from 1993 to 2005. Since retiring from the court, Neumann has been serving as the Executive Director of the State Bar Association of North Dakota.

== Biography ==
Justice Neumann was born in Minot, North Dakota. He grew up in Bowbells and in Crosby, North Dakota, graduating from Crosby High School in 1961 and from the University of North Dakota in 1965. He graduated from Stanford Law School in 1968 and returned to North Dakota, going into private practice at Williston and then Bottineau. In October 1979, he was appointed to the District Court and was elected in 1980 and reelected in 1984 and 1990. From 1981 through 1987, Neumann served on the North Dakota Judicial Conduct Commission. He was the first trial judge to chair the North Dakota Judicial Conference, from 1987 to 1989. In November 1992, he was elected to a ten-year term on the North Dakota Supreme Court, beginning January 1, 1993. Reelected in 2002. Justice Neumann has been a member of the Board of Directors of American Judicature Society since 1998. He and his wife Jackie have two children. Justice Neumann served 12 years and 2½ months before resigning from the Court on March 14, 2005. He is currently the Executive Director of the State Bar Association of North Dakota and continues to reside in Bismarck.
