= Senator Knutson =

Senator Knutson may refer to:

- David Knutson (born 1959), Minnesota State Senate
- Milo Knutson (1917–1981), Wisconsin State Senate

== See also ==
- Senator Knudson (disambiguation)
