= Dale V. Sandstrom =

American judge

Dale Vernon Sandstrom (born March 9, 1950) is a North Dakota Republican Party politician who served as a North Dakota Public Service Commissioner from 1983 to 1992, and as a justice of the North Dakota Supreme Court from 1992 to 2016.

== Biography ==
Dale V. Sandstrom was born in Grand Forks, North Dakota, and raised in Fargo, North Dakota. He graduated with a B.A. degree from North Dakota State University and a juris doctor degree from the University of North Dakota School of Law. He was elected to the Supreme Court in 1992 to serve the remaining unexpired term of Justice H.F. Gierke III and was reelected in 1996 and 2006 to ten-year terms. He served until his retirement on December 31, 2016.

Sandstrom was the major force behind the website maintained by the North Dakota Supreme Court, which has won several awards in legal circles. Sandstrom is active in Scouting as an adult, an Eagle Scout and recipient of the Distinguished Eagle Scout Award. Sandstrom served as Lodge Advisor for Pa-Hin Lodge while his son was the Lodge Chief. His mother-in-law is Grand Forks Herald columnist Marilyn Hagerty.

As a youth, Sandstrom was also active in the Order of DeMolay, which he later served as International Grand Master in 2007.

== Career ==
- 1981 - State Securities Commissioner
- 1983 - appointed to the North Dakota Public Service Commission
- 1984, 1990 - elected to six-year terms on the Commission
- 1992 - elected Justice of the Supreme Court
- 1996 - reelected to serve a ten-year term
- 2006 - reelected to serve another ten-year term

Political offices
Preceded by Richard A. Elkin	North Dakota Public Service Commissioner; 1983–1992	Succeeded by Susan Wefald
Legal offices
Preceded by J. Philip Johnson	Justice of the North Dakota Supreme Court; 1992–2016	Succeeded by Jerod E. Tufte
