= Nels Johnson (judge) =

North Dakota Supreme Court Justice (1954–1958)

Nels G. Johnson (April 30, 1896 – December 2, 1958) served as a justice of the North Dakota Supreme Court from April 1, 1954, until his death on December 2, 1958.

== Early life ==
Born in Akranes, Iceland, Johnson immigrated to the United States in 1900 with his parents, Gudbjartur Jonsson and Gudrun Olafsdottir, and brother Jon. They settled on a McHenry County farm near Upham, North Dakota, along the Mouse River. The eldest of six children, he graduated from Bottineau High School. During World War I, he served in the U.S. Army in France, participating in battles at St. Mihiel, Meuse-Argonne, Marbache, and Lucey.

After the war, Johnson earned B.A. and L.L.B. degrees from the University of North Dakota and gained admission to practice law on July 9, 1926. In 1931, he married Ruth Hallenbeck of Inkster, North Dakota.

== Legal and judicial career ==
Johnson began practicing law in Towner, North Dakota, and served as McHenry County State’s Attorney from 1934 to 1944. Elected North Dakota Attorney General in 1944, he won re-election in 1946 but resigned on September 1, 1948. After six years in private practice, he joined the North Dakota Supreme Court on April 1, 1954, at age 57. He won election in 1954 and secured a ten-year term in 1958. Instead, he died at age 62 after serving four years and eight months.

As Attorney General, Johnson argued Ashbury Hospital v. Cass County, 326 U.S. 207 (1945), before the U.S. Supreme Court, successfully defending a Depression-era statute requiring foreign corporations to sell farmland not essential to their business. The Court upheld the law, affirming states’ rights to regulate foreign corporations under the Fourteenth Amendment. 326 U.S. at 211–212, 216.

On the North Dakota Supreme Court, Johnson authored 64 majority opinions and one dissent. In State v. Whiteman, he wrote for a unanimous court, overturning Oscar Whiteman’s second-degree murder conviction due to a coerced confession and an invalid waiver of counsel. Johnson noted:

The defendant, an Indian citizen, aged 25 with a grade school education, faced a serious crime without counsel or advice. Detained in a hostile environment, he endured intimidation, threats, and violence, feeling compelled to plead guilty.

Building on State v. Magrum, 38 N.W.2d 358 (N.D. 1949), and citing Betts v. Brady, 316 U.S. 455 (1942), the court emphasized the Fourteenth Amendment’s Due Process Clause requires counsel for indigent defendants in serious cases unless clearly waived. Whiteman and co-defendant Donald Malnourie were later convicted after a trial. The Dunn County Sheriff faced conviction for civil rights violations over the coerced confessions. The Starr murder case drew over 60 articles in the Bismarck Tribune between 1954 and 1982.

Party political offices
Preceded by Alvin C. Strutz	Republican nominee for North Dakota Attorney General; 1944, 1946	Succeeded by Wallace E. Warner
