= Jerod E. Tufte =

American judge (born 1975)

Jerod Tufte

Justice of the North Dakota Supreme Court
- Incumbent
- Assumed office January 1, 2017
- Preceded by: Dale V. Sandstrom

Personal details
- Born: Jerod Elton Tufte; April 9, 1975 (age 51) Minot, North Dakota, U.S.
- Education: Case Western Reserve University (BS); Arizona State University, Tempe (JD)

Military service
- Allegiance: United States
- Branch/service: United States Army; North Dakota Army National Guard
- Years of service: 2008–2016
- Unit: United States Army Judge Advocate General's Corps

Jerod Elton Tufte (born April 9, 1975) is an American lawyer and jurist who has served as a justice of the North Dakota Supreme Court since 2017. He previously served as state's attorney for Kidder County, counsel for Governor Jack Dalrymple, and district judge.

== Early life and education ==
Tufte was born in Minot, North Dakota. He graduated from Case Western Reserve University in 1997 and the Sandra Day O'Connor College of Law in 2002.

== Career ==
Prior to law school, Tufte was a computer engineer for Motorola. After graduating from law school, he was a law clerk to Judge Roger Leland Wollman of the United States Court of Appeals for the Eighth Circuit from 2002 to 2003. He worked private practice in Phoenix, Arizona and Steele, North Dakota. He served as Kidder County State's Attorney for from 2005 to 2011 and Sheridan County State's Attorney in 2011. He was a JAG Corps officer for the North Dakota Army National Guard from 2008 to 2016. He was legal counsel to Governor Jack Dalrymple from 2011 to 2014.

In 2014, Governor Dalrymple appointed Tufte district judge of the Southeast Judicial District. He served as district judge chambered at the Barnes County Courthouse in Valley City from 2014 to 2016. He was elected to the Supreme Court in 2016 and took office January 1, 2017.

Legal offices
| Preceded by Dale V. Sandstrom | Justice of the North Dakota Supreme Court; 2017–present | Incumbent |
