= Ralph J. Erickstad =

American judge

41st Chief Justice of the North Dakota Supreme Court
- In office 1973 – December 31, 1992
- Preceded by: Alvin C. Strutz
- Succeeded by: Gerald W. VandeWalle

Personal details
- Born: August 15, 1922
- Died: July 12, 2001 (aged 78)

Ralph J. Erickstad (August 15, 1922 – July 12, 2001) was the Chief Justice on the North Dakota Supreme Court from 1973 to 1992. He retired December 31, 1992 after serving 30 years on the Supreme Court.

== Biography ==
Erickstad was born near the farming community of Starkweather, North Dakota. He was the descendant of Norwegian immigrant homesteaders. He served in the United States Air Force (Eighth Air Force) during World War II as a gunner and radio operator aboard a Consolidated B-24 Liberator. After World War II he was honorably discharged from service. He attended the University of North Dakota and went on to achieve a J.D. from the University of Minnesota Law School. In 1949, he began practicing law in Devils Lake, North Dakota. Between 1949 and 1962 he progressed from police magistrate to states attorney, to state senator. In 1962 he was elected to serve on the North Dakota State Supreme Court. Starting in 1973, he was repeatedly elected to the position of Supreme Justice for five years at a time until his retirement in 1992. In 2000, the North Dakota Supreme Courtroom was dedicated in his honor.

== Awards and honors ==
- North Dakota National Leadership Award of Excellence (1987)
- Distinguished Service Award from the State Bar Association (1988)
- National Center for State Courts' Distinguished Service Award (1987)
- AJS Herbert Harley Award from the American Judicature Society (1992)

== Personal life ==
He married Lois K. Jacobson on July 30, 1949 in Minneapolis, MN. They were the parents of two sons. Erickstad died in Bismarck, North Dakota during 2001. He was buried in the North Dakota Veterans Cemetery in Mandan, North Dakota.

Legal offices
Preceded by Alvin C. Strutz	Chief Justices of North Dakota; 1973–1992	Succeeded by Gerald W. VandeWalle
