= Carol Ronning Kapsner =

American judge

Carol Ronning Kapsner (born November 25, 1947) is a former Justice of the North Dakota Supreme Court. Carol Ronning Kapsner was born and raised in Bismarck, North Dakota.

== Early life and education ==
She graduated from St. Mary's Central High School in 1965. She earned a B.A. degree in English literature from College of St. Catherine in 1969, studied 17th-century English literature at Oxford University, received a Master of Arts degree in English literature from Indiana University Bloomington, and a Juris Doctor degree from the University of Colorado Law School in Boulder, Colorado in 1977.

== Career ==
She was appointed to the Supreme Court in October 1998. She retired from active service on July 31, 2017.

- 1977 - started the law firm of Kapsner and Kapsner
- 1980 - served as president of the Burleigh County Bar Association.
- 1988-1996 - appointed by the Bar Association to serve on the Judicial Conference
- 1998 - appointed by Governor Ed Schafer to fill vacancy created by Justice Herbert L. Meschke
- 2000 - elected to a full 10-year term
