= James Morris (North Dakota judge) =

American judge (1893–1980)

James Morris (January 2, 1893 – July 20, 1980) was Attorney General of North Dakota, and a justice of the North Dakota Supreme Court from 1935 to 1964.

Born in a sod house in Bordulac, North Dakota, Morris attended high school and college in Cincinnati, receiving his law degree from the University of Cincinnati Law School. He entered the practice of law in Carrington, North Dakota, which was interrupted by service in World War II. He was appointed Assistant Attorney General in 1928, winning election to the office of Attorney General later that year. In 1934 he defeated Justice George Moellring for a seat on the North Dakota Supreme Court. Morris was reelected in 1944 and 1954, and served continuously except for a year-long leave of absence to accept an appointment from President Harry Truman to serve as a trial judge for a War Crimes Tribunal in Germany following World War II. He did not serve as a judge for the more famous Nuremberg trials, but served on a tribunal for the trial of twenty-three officials of I.G. Farben Industries.

He died in Bismarck, North Dakota.

Party political offices
Preceded by George F. Shafer	Republican nominee for North Dakota Attorney General; 1928, 1930	Succeeded by Arthur J. Gronna
Legal offices
Preceded by George F. Shafer	Attorney General of North Dakota; 1929–1932	Succeeded by Arthur J. Gronna
Preceded by George Moellring	Justice of the North Dakota Supreme Court; 1935–1964	Succeeded by Harvey B. Knudson
