= Thomas J. Burke (North Dakota judge) =

American judge (1896–1966)

Thomas J. Burke (October 24, 1896 – March 20, 1966) was a justice of the North Dakota Supreme Court from 1938 to March 20, 1966. He was born in Rolla, North Dakota and graduated from Harvard College (BA). His father also served on the North Dakota Supreme Court, John Burke. He also served in the North Dakota House of Representatives prior to his stint in the Supreme Court.
