= Robert Vogel (judge) =

American judge (1918–2005)

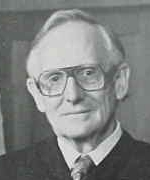
Robert L. Vogel, North Dakota Supreme Court

Robert L. Vogel (December 6, 1918 – January 28, 2005) was an American lawyer and judge from North Dakota. He served as U.S. Attorney for the District of North Dakota and an associate justice of the North Dakota Supreme Court. Robert was one of five sons of Frank A. Vogel and Louella Vogel. His father, who served as the North Dakota Tax Commissioner, Highway Commissioner and manager of the Bank of North Dakota, was also a leader of the Nonpartisan League and a close confidant of Gov. William Langer.

Vogel graduated from Bismarck High School in 1935. He earned his undergraduate degree from the University of North Dakota in 1939 and his law degree from William Mitchell College of Law (then the Minneapolis-Minnesota College of Law) in 1942. He was admitted to both the Minnesota and North Dakota Bars. He married Elsa Mork in 1942. He was in private practice in Garrison, North Dakota from 1943 to 1948, at which time he was elected McLean County States Attorney. In 1954, President Dwight Eisenhower appointed him U.S. Attorney for the District of North Dakota, a position he held until 1961. Afterward, Vogel became a partner in the eponymous firm of Vogel, Bair, and Brown, located in Mandan, North Dakota. He made an unsuccessful run for Congress the next year as a member of the Democratic/Nonpartisan League.

In 1973, Governor Arthur A. Link appointed Vogel to the North Dakota Supreme Court, and he won a ten-year term in the following year's general election. Despite his win, Vogel resigned from the supreme court four years later to become a professor at the University of North Dakota School of Law. He simultaneously opened the Vogel Law Firm in Grand Forks.

Vogel retired in 1997, and died eight years later on January 28, 2005, in Rochester, Minnesota.

With his wife of 62 years, Elsa Vogel, he had four children, Mary Vogel Carrick; Sarah Vogel, also an attorney who practices at the Sarah Vogel Law Office, P.C. in Bismarck and formerly North Dakota Commissioner of Agriculture; Frank E. Vogel, Professor of Islamic Law, Harvard Law School; and Robert "Bobby" Vogel of Grand Forks, a lecturer and civil rights advocate for the disabled community.
