= Gudmunder Grimson =

American judge (1878–1965)

Gudmundur Grimson (November 20, 1878 – June 22, 1965) was a justice of the North Dakota Supreme Court from September 19, 1949, to December 31, 1958.

Born in Iceland, Grimson was brought by his family to the Dakota Territory in 1882. They settled in what would eventually become Milton, North Dakota, where Grimson attended and then taught in the public schools. Beginning in 1898, Milton attended the University of North Dakota in intermittently, receiving a B.A. in 1904 and an M.A. in 1905. He was a Fellow of the University of Chicago in 1905 and 1906, and received his law degree from the University of North Dakota in 1906.
