= Alexander Burr =

American judge (1871–1951)

Alexander Burr (February 25, 1871 – February 8, 1951) was a justice of the North Dakota Supreme Court from September 1, 1926, to September 15, 1949.
