= Courts of North Dakota =

Court system in North Dakota

Courts of North Dakota include:

State courts of North Dakota

- North Dakota Supreme Court
  - North Dakota District Courts (7 judicial districts)
    - North Dakota Municipal Courts

Federal courts located in North Dakota

- United States District Court for the District of North Dakota
