= Luther E. Birdzell =

American judge

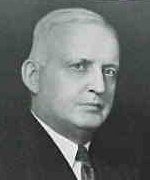
Luther E. Birdzell

Luther E. Birdzell (December 1, 1880 – February 23, 1973) was an American teacher and lawyer who served as a justice of the Supreme Court of North Dakota from 1917 to 1933. He died at the age of 92 in 1973.
