= University of North Dakota School of Law =

Law school in Grand Forks, North Dakota, US

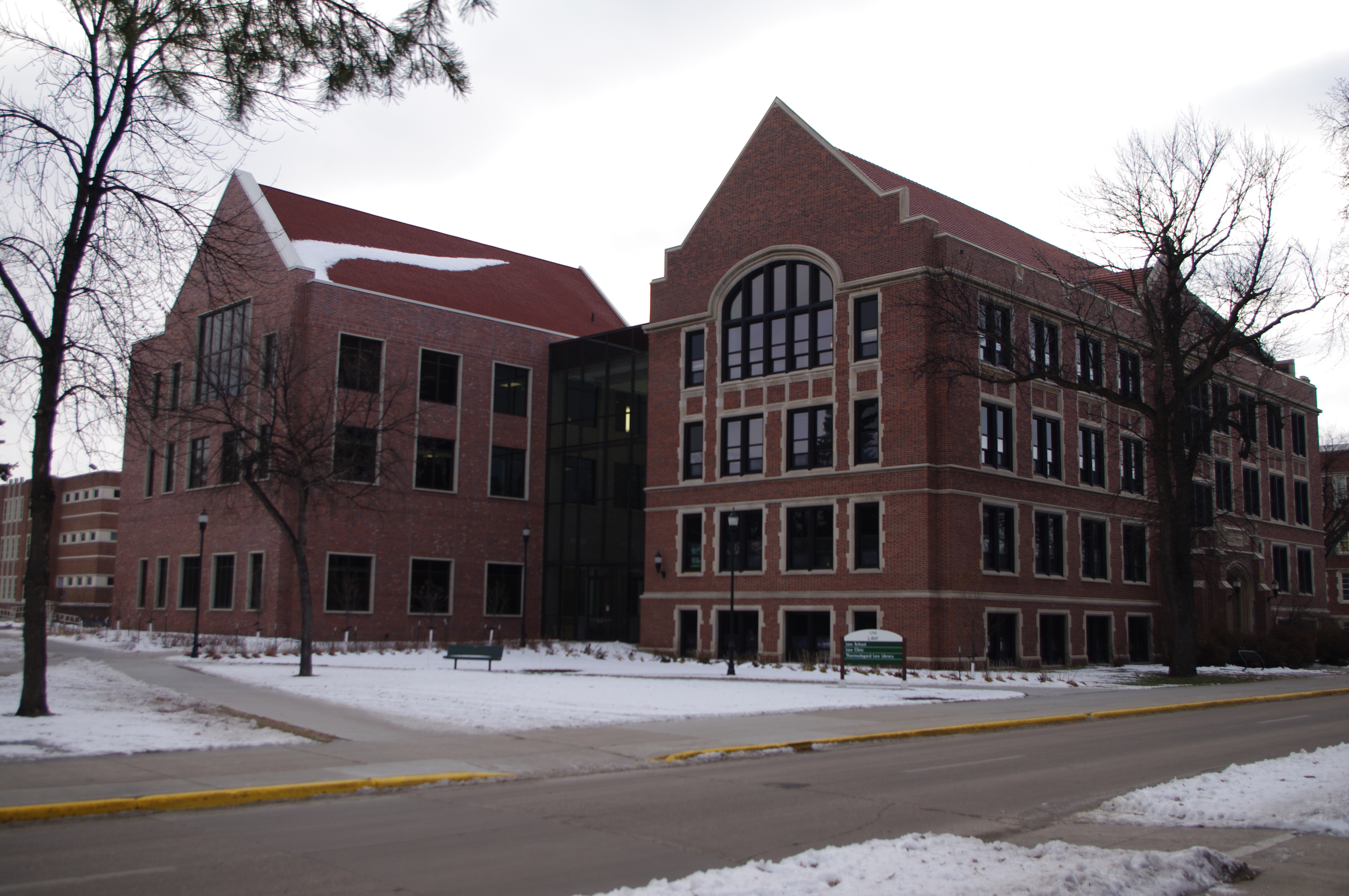
- Motto: Lux et Lex (Latin for Light and Law)
- Established: 1899
- School type: Public law school
- Dean: Del Crandall
- Location: Grand Forks, North Dakota, U.S. 47°55′17″N 97°04′14″W
- Enrollment: 241
- Faculty: 17 professors, 2 visiting professors and 20 affiliated members
- USNWR ranking: 156th (2026)
- Website: law.und.edu

The University of North Dakota School of Law is located in Grand Forks, North Dakota, at the University of North Dakota (UND). It is the only law school in North Dakota. It was established in 1899. The law school is home to approximately 240 students and has more than 3,000 alumni. It has one of the smallest student populations among the American Bar Association accredited law schools.

The institution offers the J.D. degree and a joint degree program in law and public administration (J.D./M.P.A.) and business administration (J.D./M.B.A.). It also offers certificates in Indian law and aviation law. The school is also home to the Northern Plains Indian Law Center. According to North Dakota's official 2016 ABA-required disclosures, 51.3% of the Class of 2016 obtained full-time, long-term, JD-required employment nine months after graduation.

== History ==
The UND School of Law was founded in 1899. The law school's first dean was Guy C. H. Corliss, who served as the first Chief Justice of the North Dakota Supreme Court.

== Admissions ==
In 2018, the median GPA for incoming UND Law students was 3.13, while the median LSAT score was 148. In 2018, the School of Law received 275 applications for its J.D. program, of which 176 were accepted and 62 were enrolled. In recent years, the school has increased its student diversity through partial tuition waivers for members of minority groups and transfers from Charlotte School of Law and Arizona Summit Law School after the schools' closures in 2017 and 2018 respectively. In addition, the school attracts international students from Canada, Norway, and other countries.

== Ranking ==
In its 2026 ranking of American law schools, U.S. News & World Report ranked UND Law 156 out of approximately 197 accredited law schools.

== Curriculum ==
UND Law has a formal Curricular Mission Statement to guide changes to its educational program. In 2013–14, the school reconfigured the required first-year curriculum, adding a new Professional Foundations course.

== Building ==
In 2013, the North Dakota legislature approved $11.4 million for a major addition and renovation to the existing building. Construction started in Summer 2014 and was completed in Fall 2015, with the dedication and ribbon-cutting taking place on October 9.

== Thormodsgard Law Library ==
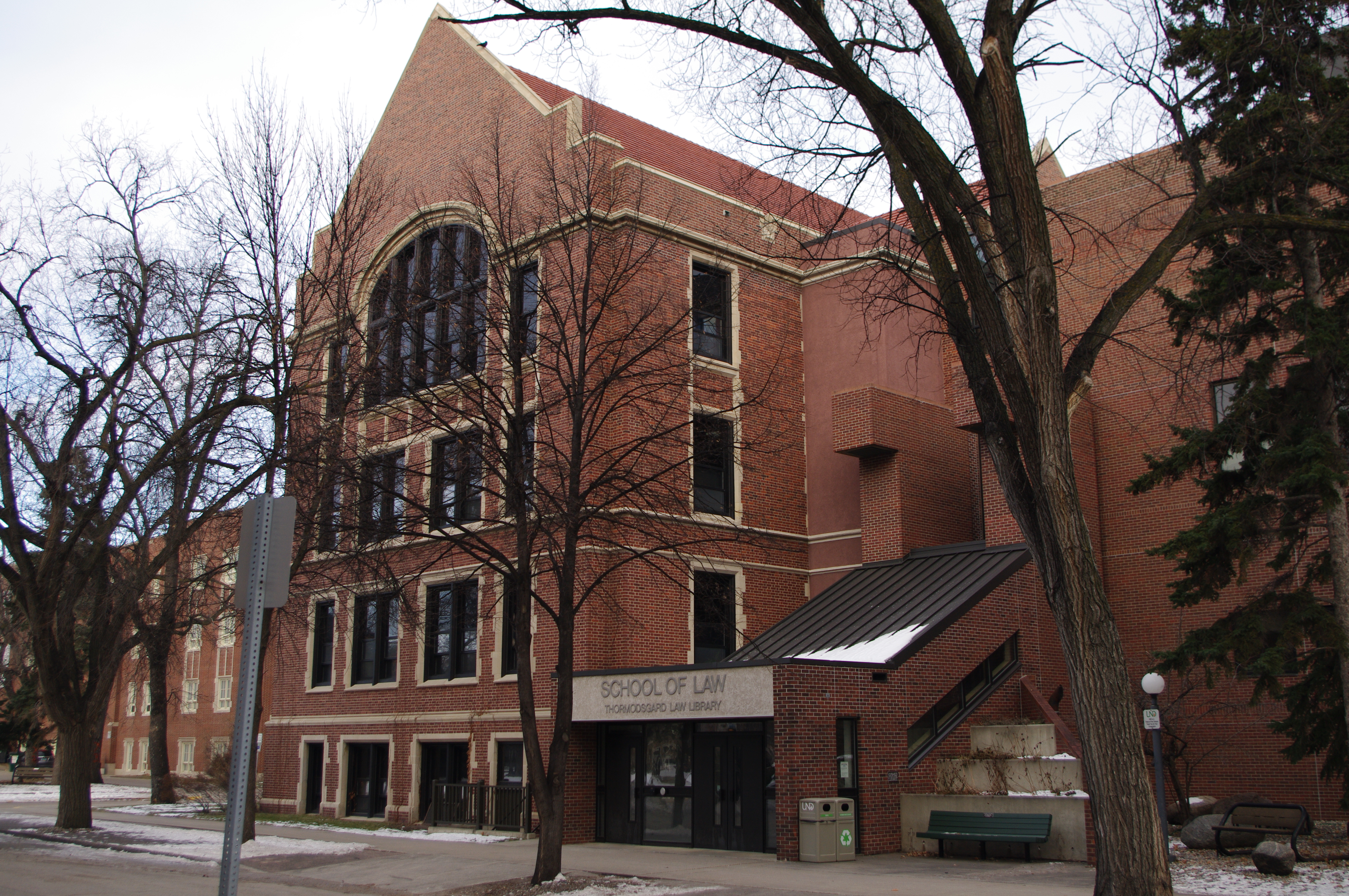
Thormodsgard Law Library

The three-story Thormodsgard Law Library adjacent to the School of Law building at UND is named in honor of Olaf H. Thormodsgard, Dean of the University of North Dakota School of Law from 1933 to 1962.

The library underwent a renovation in 2003 that added mobile compact shelving. The upgrade increased the shelf-space for the library's growing collection of legal materials (which includes a core collection of 312,000 volumes). Following a 15-month renovation, a new wing opened.

== Employment ==
According to North Dakota's official 2016 ABA-required disclosures, 51.3% of the Class of 2016 obtained full-time, long-term, JD-required employment nine months after graduation. North Dakota's Law School Transparency under-employment score is 31.6%, indicating the percentage of the Class of 2016 unemployed, pursuing an additional degree, or working in a non-professional, short-term, or part-time job nine months after graduation.

== Costs ==
The total cost of attendance (indicating the cost of tuition, fees, and living expenses) at North Dakota for the 2015–2016 academic year is $27,987 for residents and $41,976 for nonresidents. The Law School Transparency estimated debt-financed cost of attendance for three years (2013) is $113,029 for residents and $163,484 for nonresidents.

== Notable alumni ==
- Kelly Armstrong - (J.D. 2003), U.S. Congressman (R-ND) (2019–2024), Governor of North Dakota (2024–present)
- Olger B. Burtness - (LL.B 1907), U.S. Congressman (R-ND) (1921–1933), North Dakota District Judge (1950-1960)
- Kermit Edward Bye - (J.D. 1962), Circuit Judge, United States Court of Appeals for the Eighth Circuit (2000–2016)
- James R. Carrigan - (J.D. 1953), United States District Judge for the District of Colorado (1979–1995)
- Bryn Chyzyk - (J.D. 2020), Assistant Coach and General Manager of the North Dakota Fighting Hawks men's ice hockey team (2025–present)
- Daniel J. Crothers - (J.D. 1982), Justice of the North Dakota Supreme Court (2005–present)
- Edward J. Devitt - (LL.B 1935), U.S. Congressman (1947–1949) (R-MN), United States District Judge for the District of Minnesota (1954–1992)
- Ralph R. Erickson - (J.D. 1984), North Dakota District Judge (1994–2003), Chief United States District Judge for the District of North Dakota (2003–2017), Circuit Judge, United States Court of Appeals for the Eighth Circuit
- Lisa K. Fair McEvers - (J.D. 1997), Justice of the North Dakota Supreme Court (2014–present)
- H.F. Gierke III - (J.D. 1966), Judge, United States Court of Appeals for the Armed Forces (1991–present), elevated to Chief Judge in 2004
- Daniel L. Hovland - (J.D. 1979), United States District Judge for the District of North Dakota (2003–present)
- William Langer - (LL.B 1906), Attorney General of North Dakota (1919–1920), Governor of North Dakota (1933–1934, 1937–1939), U.S. Senator (R-ND) (1940–1959)
- Mary Muehlen Maring - (J.D. 1975), Justice of the North Dakota Supreme Court (1996–2013)
- John Moses - (LL.B. 1915), Governor of North Dakota (1939–1945), U.S. Senator (D-ND) (1945)
- Allen I. Olson - Governor of North Dakota (1981–1985)
- Rosanna M. Peterson - (J.D. 1991), United States District Judge for the Eastern District of Washington (2010–present)
- Earl Pomeroy - (J.D. 1979), U.S. Congressman (D-ND) (1993–2011)
- Dale V. Sandstrom - (J.D. 1975), North Dakota Public Service Commissioner (1983–1992), Justice of the North Dakota Supreme Court (1992–2015)
- Charles Tighe - (LL.B. 1952), Lieutenant Governor of North Dakota (1965–1969)
- Daniel M. Traynor - (J.D. 1997), United States District Judge for the District of North Dakota (2020–present)
- Gerald W. VandeWalle - (J.D. 1958), Justice of the North Dakota Supreme Court (1978–present), elevated to Chief Justice in 1993.
- Rodney S. Webb - (J.D. 1959), United States Attorney for the District of North Dakota (1981–1987), United States District Judge for the District of North Dakota (1987–2009)
- Peter D. Welte - (J.D. 1997), United States District Judge for the District of North Dakota (2019–present)
