= North Dakota Supreme Court =

Highest court in the U.S. state of North Dakota

- Seal
- Interactive map of North Dakota Supreme Court
- Established: 1889
- Jurisdiction: North Dakota
- Location: Bismarck, North Dakota
- Composition method: Non-partisan election
- Authorised by: Constitution of North Dakota
- Appeals to: Supreme Court of the United States
- Judge term length: 10 years
- Number of positions: 5
- Website: Official website

Chief Justice
- Currently: Lisa K. Fair McEvers
- Since: 2026
- Lead position ends: 2028
- Jurist term ends: 2028

The North Dakota Supreme Court is the highest court of law in the state of North Dakota. The Court rules on questions of law in appeals from the state's district courts.

Each of the five justices is elected on a no-party ballot for a ten-year term, arranged so that one seat is contested every two years. The Chief Justice is elected from the Justices every five years (or upon vacancy) by vote of the Supreme Court justices and the District Court judges.

The Supreme Court is empowered to constitute a Court of Appeals consisting of a three-member panel chosen from active and retired District Court judges, retired Supreme Court justices, and lawyers. The Court of Appeals only hears cases specifically assigned to it by the Supreme Court, which is done only infrequently.

Under Article 6, Section 4 of the North Dakota Constitution, the North Dakota Supreme Court "shall not declare a legislative enactment unconstitutional unless at least four of the members of the court so decide." North Dakota and Nebraska are the only two states that require a supermajority of state Supreme Court justices to rule a legislative provision unconstitutional.

== Justices ==
=== Current composition ===
Name	Born	Start	Chief term	Term ends	Appointer	Law school
Lisa McEvers, Chief Justice	1962 (age 63–64)	January 1, 2014	2026–present	2028	Jack Dalrymple (R)	UND
Jerod Tufte	April 9, 1975 (age 51)	January 1, 2017	–	2036	—N/a (Note: Took office after being elected in a nonpartisan election.)	ASU
Jon Jensen	1965 (age 60–61)	August 15, 2017	2020–2026	2030	Doug Burgum (R)	UND
Douglas Bahr	1960 or 1961 (age 65–66)	February 1, 2023	–	2036	Doug Burgum (R)	USD
Mark Friese	1969 (age 56–57)	March 9, 2026	–	2028	Kelly Armstrong (R)	UND
