= William Murray =

William, Will or Bill Murray may refer to:

== Nobility ==
- William Murray, 2nd Earl of Tullibardine (c. 1574–1626), Scottish landowner
- William Murray, 1st Earl of Dysart (1600?–1655), Scottish nobleman and whipping-boy to King Charles I of England
- William Murray, 2nd Lord Nairne (c. 1665–1726), Scottish peer and Jacobite
- William Murray, Marquess of Tullibardine (1689–1746), Jacobite
- William Murray, 1st Earl of Mansfield (1705–1793), British jurist
- William Murray, 4th Earl of Mansfield (1806–1898), British nobleman
- William Murray, 5th Earl of Mansfield (1860–1906), British nobleman, Earl of Mansfield
- William Murray, 8th Earl of Mansfield (1930–2015), Scottish nobleman and Conservative politician
- William Keith Murray (1801–1861), Scottish peer, landowner and soldier

== Sports ==
=== Association football ===
- Bill Murray (footballer, born 1898), English footballer
- Bill Murray (footballer, born 1901) (1901–1961), Scottish football player and manager (Sunderland AFC)
- Bill Murray (footballer, born 1904) (1904–1940), Scottish footballer
- Billy Murray (footballer) (1922–1992), English footballer (Manchester City)
- Willie Murray (footballer, born 1954), Scottish footballer who played in the 1974 Scottish League Cup Final
- Willie Murray (footballer, born 1881) (1881–1929), Scottish footballer for Sunderland

=== Other sports ===
- Bill Murray (baseball) (1893–1943), American professional baseball infielder
- Billy Murray (boxer) (1892–1926), American boxer
- Billy Murray (baseball) (1864–1937), American baseball manager
- W. H. Murray (William Hutchison Murray, 1913–1996), Scottish mountain climber and writer
- Bill Murray (offensive lineman) (born 1997), American football player
- Bill Murray (American football coach) (1908–1986), head football coach at University of Delaware from 1940 to 1950 and Duke University from 1951 to 1965
- Bill Murray (sport shooter) (born 1956), Scottish sport shooter
- William Murray (Irish athlete) (1881–1942), Irish athlete at the 1908 Olympic Games
- William Murray (Australian athlete) (1882–1977), Australian athlete at the 1912 Olympic Games
- William Murray (rugby union) (1894–?), Scottish international rugby union player
- Willie Murray (bowls) (born 1940), Irish lawn and indoor bowler

== Politics ==
- William Murray (Australian politician) (1890–1980), New South Wales politician
- William Murray (Dumfriesshire MP) (1865–1923), British MP for Dumfriesshire, 1918–1922
- William Murray (New Brunswick politician) (1857–1913), Canadian politician
- William Murray (Newcastle-under-Lyme MP) (1796–?), British MP for Newcastle-under-Lyme, 1859–1865
- William Murray (New York politician) (1803–1875), U.S. representative from New York
- William Murray (New Zealand politician) (1832–1900), New Zealand politician
- William Murray (Ontario politician) (1839–1898), 19th-century Canadian politician
- Bill Murray (CIA officer), American CIA officer
- William Francis Murray (1881–1918), U.S. representative from Massachusetts
- William H. Murray (1869–1956), American politician from Oklahoma
- William Harvey Murray (1916–1991), political figure in British Columbia, Canada
- William J. Murray (politician) (c. 1884–1966), New York state senator 1937–1944
- William Alexander Murray, Canadian politician from Ontario
- William Pitt Murray (1825–1910), American lawyer and politician
- William Vans Murray (1760–1803), U.S. representative from Maryland
- William S. Murray (judge) (1916–1998), American lawyer, judge and politician in North Dakota

== Arts and entertainment ==
- William Henry Murray (1790–1852), Scottish actor and theatre manager
- Billy Murray (singer) (1877–1954), Irish-American singer
- William Staite Murray (1881–1962), British studio potter
- William Murray (musician) (1950–1998), Scottish drummer and photographer
- William B. Murray (1935–2019), American operatic baritone
- Billy Murray (actor) (born 1941), English actor
- Bill Murray (born 1950), American actor
- William Murray (writer) (1926–2005), American writer of mystery novels
- Will Murray (1953–2026), American author and scholar of pulp fiction
- Bill Murray (cartoonist) (born 1955), American cartoonist
- William Grant Murray (1877–1950), British art teacher, gallery curator and artist
- "Bill Murray", a song from the 2007 Gorillaz album D-Sides

== Religion ==
- William Henry Harrison Murray (1840–1904), American clergyman, author, and promoter of outdoor pursuits
- William J. Murray (born 1946), American Christian author and evangelist
- William Edward Murray (1920–2013), Australian prelate of the Roman Catholic Church
- William Murray (bishop), 17th-century Anglican bishop

== Other ==
- William Murray (gardener) (1819–1901), South Australian pioneer gardener
- William Daniel Murray (1908–1994), U.S. federal judge
- William George Murray (1884–1975), main perpetrator of the Coniston massacre
- William H. Murray (Medal of Honor) (1876–1923), American Medal of Honor recipient
- William Mackintosh Murray (1831–1920), co-founder of D. & W. Murray Limited, Australian drapery wholesaler
- William S. Murray (engineer) (1873–1942), American engineer
- William Robert Murray (1896–1990), New Zealand labourer, policeman and unionist
- William Murray (educationist) (1912–1995), created the Ladybird Peter and Jane reading scheme
- William Murray (died 1513), Scottish landowner and courtier
- William Murray (died 1562), his son, Scottish landowner
- William Murray of Tullibardine (died 1583), his son, Scottish courtier
- William Murray (valet), Scottish courtier
- William M. Murray (engineer) (1910–1990), American engineer
- "William Murray", an alias briefly used by Monk Eastman

== See also ==
- Billy Murray (disambiguation)
