= David Murray (poet) =

English courtier and poet (1567–1629)

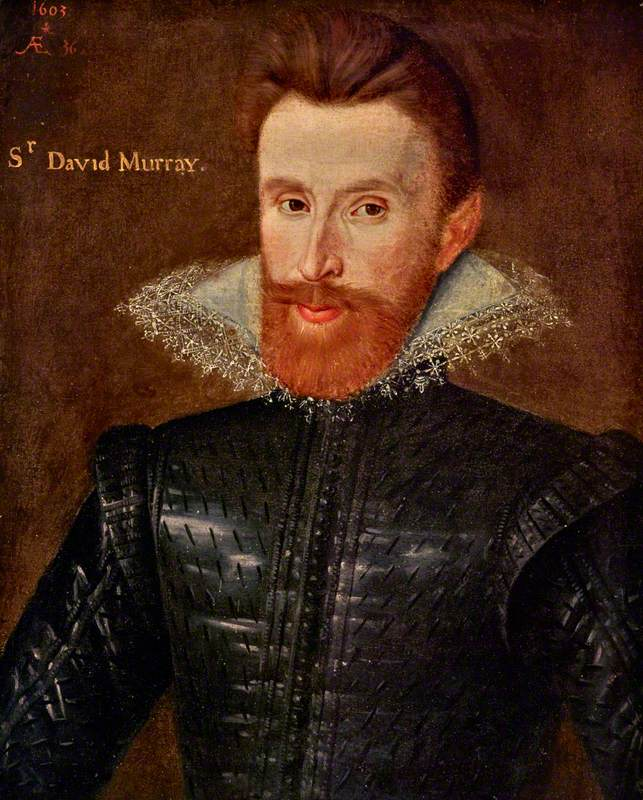
David Murray of Gorthy, 1603, National Galleries of Scotland

Sir David Murray of Gorthy (1567–1629) was an officer in the household of Henry Frederick, Prince of Wales, in England from 1603 to 1612, and poet.

== Family background ==
A member of the Scottish Murray family, David's father, Robert Murray, was the Laird of Abercairny, near Crieff; his mother was Katherine Murray, a daughter of William Murray of Tullibardine. David had an older brother, William, and younger brothers, Mungo Murray of Craigie, John Minister of Dunfermline and Leith, Andrew, Quintigern, and James. His two sisters were Nicola(s) (died 1611), who married Robert Douglas, 1st Viscount Belhaven, who had been Prince Henry's Stable Master, and Anne, who married William Moncrieff of Moncrieff.

William Murray, David's elder brother, was brought up at Stirling Castle with the young James VI of Scotland. Annabell Murray, Countess of Mar, who shared responsibility for the King at Stirling, was the aunt of their father. The London "Water Poet" John Taylor made a point of visiting his great friend William during his Pennyles Pilgimage to Scotland in 1618.

David left no heirs; Mungo's sons are known by the name 'Moray', the eldest was the soldier and mathematician Robert Moray, and a younger son, William Moray of Dreghorn, Master of Works in Scotland to Charles II.

== Servant of Prince Henry ==
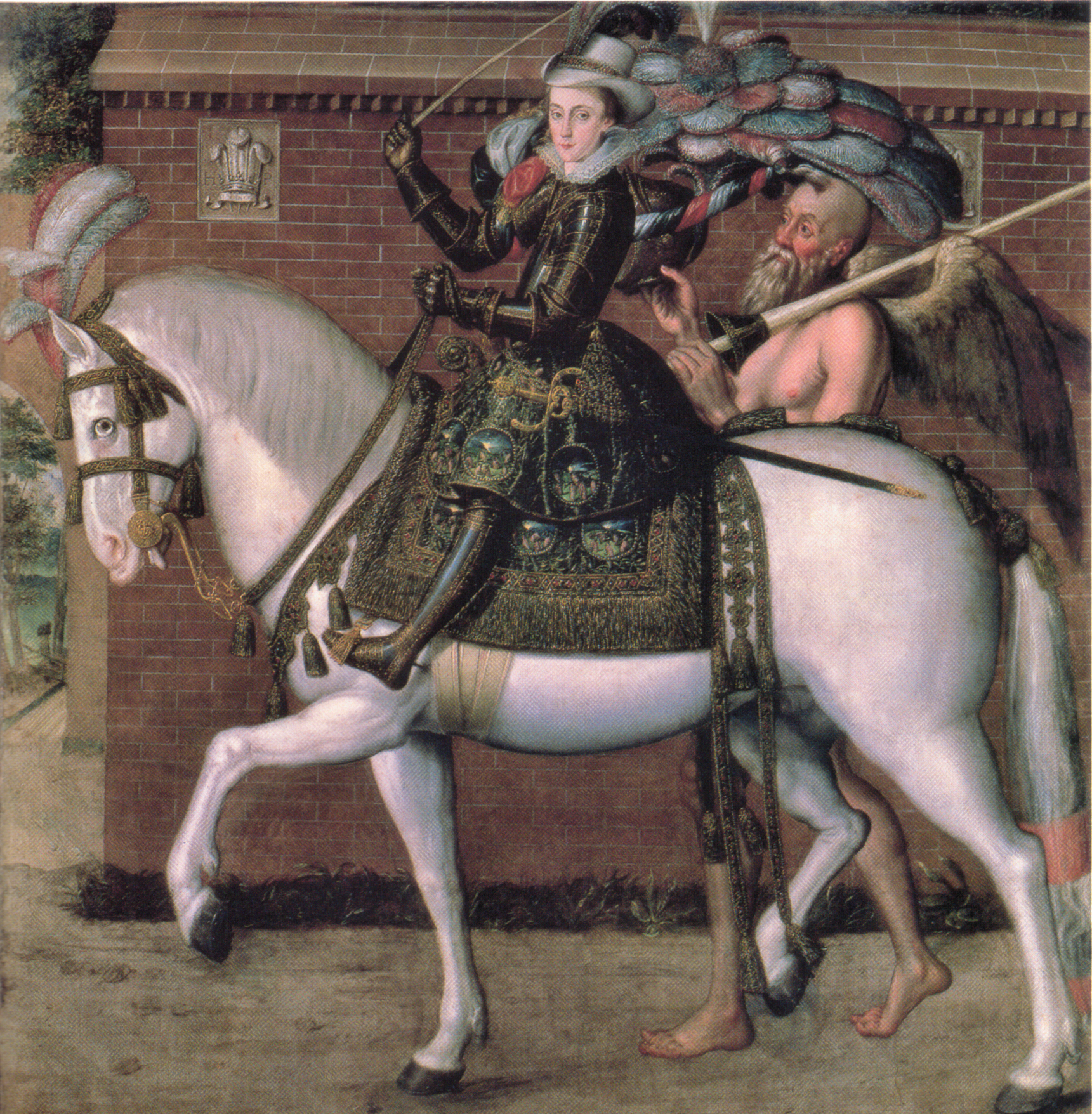
David Murray, as Master of the Wardrobe, bought the pearls for Prince Henry's tournament outfit.

David was educated at St Salvator's College at St Andrews University, but did not graduate as Master of Arts. Before James VI of Scotland became King of England, David Murray was a servant of Prince Henry at Stirling Castle. Murray went to the Netherlands in September 1600 carrying a letter of recommendation from his six-year-old master. His yearly fee of 600 marks Scots as a Gentleman of the Prince's Bedchamber was fixed 30 June 1602, by the order of the Privy Council of Scotland.

His portrait was painted in 1603 and is now displayed in the Scottish National Portrait Gallery.

=== Courtier in London ===
After the Union of the Crowns, Prince Henry and his household arrived in London at the end of June 1603. David Murray rented a lodging in a tower at the Savoy. He received a "free gift" of £200 from the exchequer. In England, Murray was the keeper of the Prince's privy purse, managing a yearly allowance of 1,000 marks. He made payments to artists and craftsmen who worked for Prince Henry including the painter Robert Peake, the ship-designer Phineas Pett, the architect Inigo Jones, and the Edinburgh jeweller George Heriot. He became the Prince's Groom of the Stole, Gentleman of the Robes and Master of the Wardrobe.

He was knighted as Sir David Murray of Gorthy at Greenwich Palace on 18 May 1605. John Hawkins wrote that Murray was "the only man in whom he (Prince Henry) had put choise trust". In August 1605 Murray wrote from Nonsuch Palace to the Earl of Salisbury, mentioning that Prince Henry had stayed for three days while hunting at the house of Sir Robert Wroth, (either the father-in-law or husband of the poet Lady Mary Wroth). King James stayed with Sir Robert Wroth at Loughton in July 1605.

When Arbella Stuart wrote to Prince Henry on 18 October 1605, she mentioned that David Murray and Adam Newton would be her intercessors in her suit to the Prince for aid. Adam Newton of Charlton was the Prince's tutor, and effective head of his household.

Murray installed a model of a ship made by Phineas Pett for the Prince in a private room in the long gallery at Richmond Palace in November 1607. The English ambassador in Venice, Henry Wotton sent a gift of Venetian treacle, made with balsam, to Murray and the Prince's tutor Adam Newton.

In 1609, Murray laid out £1,986 for pearls bought in London for the Prince's costume during the Christmas festivities and the Barriers tournament. In March 1610, Murray organised for Robert Cecil, Earl of Salisbury, to show some pictures to the Prince, with the assistance of the Earl of Arundel. The historian Roy Strong see this incident as part of the inception of the Prince's interest in European fine-art, and Murray's responsibilities came to include the Prince's cabinet of curiosities of medals and coins.

In Scotland, David's younger brother, John Murray, Minister of Leith, was imprisoned in Edinburgh Castle in 1608 for a Presbyterian sermon, and banished to Nithsdale. In 1612, William Cecil, Lord Roos, wrote to David Murray that as a Puritan himself he had objected to the proposal for the Prince to marry the Catholic infanta Maria, daughter of Charles Emmanuel I, Duke of Savoy. Roos pointed out that if the marriage went ahead Murray would be in disfavour. A marriage with the Medici was also proposed. As part of these marriage negotiations Cosimo II de' Medici had sent to Prince Henry a gift of statuettes by Giambologna. Murray accompanied the Prince in the Long Gallery at Richmond when he received these gifts on 26 June 1612.

While Prince Henry was in his final illness and delirious, according to the account of Charles Cornwallis, on 5 November 1612, the anniversary of the Gunpowder Plot, it was noted that he called out, "David, David, David." When Murray came to Prince's bedside he only said, "I would say somewhat, but I cannot utter it." Finally Henry asked Murray to burn some letters kept in a cabinet in his closet. At the Prince's funeral, Murray rode in the chariot that served as a hearse, at the Prince's feet as Master of his Wardrobe.

David Murray helped Thomas Russell secure a patent to make brimstone and copperas before 1610. Murray subsequently invested in the copperas project with Russell before July 1610, but felt he was cheated or cozened by May 1617 when he asked for a re-grant.

In the summer of 1615, David Murray received part payment of the sum of £10,022 fourteen shillings threepence halfpenny owed to him for his expenses as keeper of the Prince's wardrobe and privy purse. In 1617, he was owed a further £3,000. The Earl of Suffolk and Sir Arthur Ingram convinced him to settle for £2,000, keeping the balance. The transaction was brought up at Suffolk's trial for corruption.

== David Murray's poetry ==
John Smethwick published Murray's volume of poetry, the Tragicall Death of Sophonisba, by David Murray, Scoto-Brittaine, London (1611), together with twenty-six sonnets to fair Coelia or Caelia. The work was prefaced by two sonnets comparing Prince Henry to an eagle, and three sonnets addressed to Murray himself by his cousin John Murray, Michael Drayton and Simon Grahame. The sonnets for "my fair Caelia" were dedicated to Richard Preston, Lord Dingwall. (Preston married Elizabeth Butler, daughter of Thomas Butler, 10th Earl of Ormond.)

Murray's sonnets, like those of William Alexander of Menstrie are anglicised in vocabulary and grammar, but some employ an interlinked form used by the Castalian poets who worked for King James in Scotland the 1580s.

Smethick's volume also included the Complaint of the Shepherd Harpalus, a sonnet eulogy for Cecily Wemyss, Lady of Tullibardine, and epitaphs for his cousins David and Adam Murray.

Verses from the Complaint of Harpalus were printed as a broadsheet song by H.G. in 1625, and the heirs of Thomas Symcocke in 1628, without the music. Andro Hart of Edinburgh printed Murray's Paraphrase of the CIV Psalme (1615), with a dedicatory verse to the "phoenix-like" King James.

Thomas Kinnear edited Poems by Sir David Murray of Gorthy containing "The tragicall death of Sophonisba and Caelia. Containing certaine sonets, both London 1611", and "A paraphrase of the CIV psalme, Edinburgh 1615" in a new edition published by the Bannatyne Club, Edinburgh, 1823.

== Works dedicated to David Murray ==
John Owen, in the section of his Latin verses Epigrammatum written to Prince Henry and Charles, Duke of York, gave a verse to Sir David Murray of the Prince's inner Chamber (ab interiori thalamis.). Translated the verse is;

Kings Favours to their Favourites impart:
Wise Kings to those alone of best desert:
Our King in this excels: For, Favours he
Daigns soley to worthy men, to Thee, like Thee.

The surviving accounts kept by Murray for the Prince include payments to writers and compilers of library catalogues. The poet Michael Drayton was given £10 as a yearly payment. A number of published authors included dedications to Murray in their works. The Scottish churchman William Couper dedicated his Preparative for the New Passover, London (1607), to David Murray of the Prince's bedchamber. The Stoic Joseph Hall, a chaplain of Prince Henry, offered Murray his sixth essay in his Epistles, (1608), concerning miracles, including the capture of Guy Fawkes and Robert Catesby. Henry Peacham dedicated an emblem of 'Hercules and the apples of the Hesperides' in Minerva Britanna (1612) to the Scottish knight. The calligrapher Esther Inglis made him a manuscript of the poems of Guy de Faur. The Lincolnshire preacher Thomas Granger included Murray in the 'epistle dedicatory', 1 January 1621, for his Commentary on Ecclesiastes, London (1621).

Another of the Prince's chaplains, Daniel Price dedicated to Murray the publication of the sermon preached following the death of Prince Henry. Patrick Gordon dedicated his volume of Latin hexameters in commemoration of Prince Henry, Neptunus Brittanicus Corydonis, de Luctuouso Henrici, John Budge (1615), with a verse to Murray. The anonymous collection of 19 sonnets, Great Brittans Mourning Garment, London (1612), was dedicated to "Sir David Murray, and to the other nobly descended, and honourably minded followers of the late deceased Prince Henry."

== David Murray in literature ==
David Murray is a main character in Susanna Kearsley's historical novel The King's Messenger. In the novel, his last name is spelled Moray.

== Sources ==
- Poems of Sir David Murray of Gorthy, Bannatyne Club (1823) reprint of the Sophonisba (1611)
- S. M. Dunnigan, 'Murray, Sir David, of Gorthy (1567–1629)', Oxford Dictionary of National Biography, Oxford University Press, 2004 login required.
