= Lake Murray =

Lake Murray may refer to:

- Lake Murray (Papua New Guinea), the largest lake in Papua New Guinea
- Lake Murray (South Carolina), for a time the largest artificial lake in the world
- Lake Murray (Oklahoma), a lake and the oldest State Park in Oklahoma
- Lake Murray (California), a reservoir in San Diego

== See also ==
- Lake Murray Airport in Papua New Guinea
- Lake Murray Rural LLG in Papua New Guinea
- Lake Murray Country in South Carolina
- Lake Murray of Richland, South Carolina
- Murray Lake (disambiguation)
- Murray River (disambiguation)
