= Catherine Murray, Lady Abercairny =

Scottish aristocrat and courtier

Catherine Murray was a Scottish aristocrat and courtier.

== Life ==
She was a daughter of William Murray of Tullibardine (died 1562) and Katherine Campbell. She married Robert Murray of Abercairny (died 1594) in 1560. His father, John Murray, had been killed at the battle of Pinkie, and his older brother William Murray, who had married Margaret Oliphant, died in 1558.

In 1577 the Laird of Abercairny became involved in the trial of Violet Mar, who was accused of witchcraft and plotting the downfall of Regent Morton. They took advice from Lady Abercairny's sister Annabell Murray, Countess of Mar. On 10 October 1577 a royal messenger, Robert Binning, was sent from Edinburgh to summon Margaret Murray, Lady Clackmannan (another sister of Catherine Murray, Lady Abercairney and the Countess of Mar), the Laird of Abercairny and his wife Catherine Murray, and others, to come before the Privy Council on 18 October. Binning also brought the summons for the assize of Violet Mar for witchcraft, to be held on 24 October.

James VI wrote to them for "venison, wild fowls, fed capons" to serve at the wedding of Henrietta Stewart and George Gordon, 1st Marquess of Huntly in July 1588. Robert Murray enjoyed the confidence of Anne of Denmark, and in March 1592 she wrote to him, asking for help in administrative changes and to protect her husband from the Chancellor, John Maitland of Thirlestane, who she regarded as an enemy.

Lady Abercairny joined the household of Prince Henry at Stirling Castle in 1594 as a "dame of honour". The other ladies were her sisters Annabell Murray, Countess of Mar and Margaret Murray, Lady Clackmannan, with Lady Morton, Lady Dudhope, Lady Cambuskenneth, and the late Justice Clerk's wife.

In 1603 her sister, Annabell Murray, Countess of Mar, bequeathed to her a gown of chamlet of silk with broad velvet passementerie, breasts lined with plush, with a doublet and skirt of plain black velvet.

== Family ==
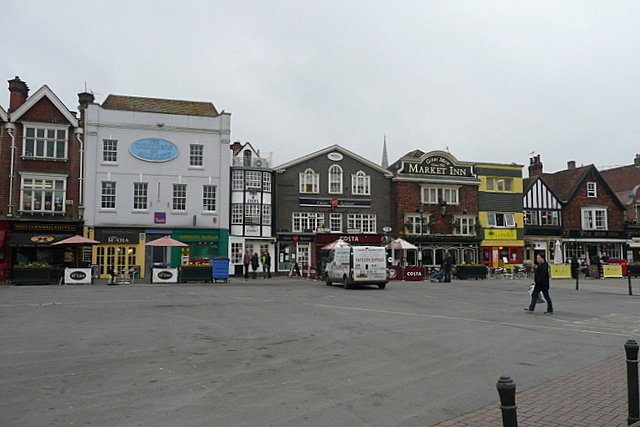
Anne of Denmark ordered William Murray to build a bonfire in the market place at Salisbury in November 1603

Her children included:

- William Murray of Abercairny (died 1640), who was educated with James VI at Stirling Castle. He became Master of Horse to Anne of Denmark. He married Christian Mercer. In June 1603 he argued with Thomas Somerset about the role of Master of Horse at York as the queen was travelling to London, and Somerset was given the job. William Murray continued in the queen's service in connection with her stable and transport and in November 1603, while at Wilton House during a progress to the west of England on account of the plague, she asked him to have her litter (her coach) publicly burnt in the market place at Salisbury.
- David Murray of Gorthy, administrator in the household of Prince Henry and poet who supervised the embroidery of Princess Elizabeth's wedding gown in 1613.
- Mungo Murray of Craigie, father of Robert Moray
- John Murray (died 1632), Minister of Dunfermline and Leith
- Andrew Murray
- Quintigern Murray.
- James Murray
- Nicola(s) Murray, who married Robert Douglas of Spott, Viscount Belhaven, who was Prince Henry's stable master
- Anne Murray, who married William Moncrieff of Moncrieff.
