= Murray River (disambiguation) =

The Murray River is a major river in the Australian states of New South Wales, Victoria, and South Australia.

Murray River may also refer to:

== Australia ==
- Murray River (Queensland), the river of the Murray Falls in Queensland
- Murray River (Western Australia), a river in Western Australia
- Murray River Council, a local government area in New South Wales
- Murray River Flag, a river navigation flag
- Murray River National Park, a protected area in South Australia
- Murray River turtle, a river turtle

== Canada ==
- Murray River (British Columbia), a river of British Columbia
- Murray River, Prince Edward Island, a town

== New Zealand ==
- Murray River (New Zealand), a minor river on Stewart Island/Rakiura

== See also ==
- Little Murray River (disambiguation)
- Lake Murray (disambiguation)
- Murray (disambiguation)
- Murray Bridge (disambiguation)
- Murray–Darling basin
