= Billy Murray =

Billy Murray may refer to:

- Billy Murray (actor) (born 1941), English actor
- Billy Murray (baseball) (1864–1937), American baseball manager
- Billy Murray (singer) (1877–1954), American singer
- Billy Murray (boxer) (1892–1926), American boxer
- Billy Murray (footballer) (1922–1992), English footballer
- Billy Murray Jr. (born 1958), ulsterian kickboxer

== See also ==
- Bill Murray (born 1950), American film actor
- William Murray (disambiguation)
