= Violet Mar =

Scottish woman accused of witchcraft

Violet Mar (died 1577) was a Scottish woman accused of witchcraft and plotting the death of Regent Morton, the ruler of Scotland.

== History ==
Violet lived at Kildeis or Keldeis in Muthill or Methven in Perthshire and was accused of using sorcery, witchcraft, incantations, and the invocation of spirits in her alleged plot against Morton. Little is known about her life or motivations.

Robert Murray of Abercairny, a local laird, was involved in her arrest and trial. He sought advice from his sister-in-law, Annabell Murray, Countess of Mar, who was the head of King James VI's household at Stirling Castle at the time.

In September 1577, Annabell Murray advised Robert Murray not to come to Stirling Castle because Regent Morton was coming. The Laird of Abercairny intended to bring Violet Mar to Stirling, and Annabell Murray suggested he obtain written statements from her accusers. This was the second letter on the subject from the Countess of Mar, indicating her active role in planning Violet Mar's trial. It has been suggested that the Countess of Mar's involvement in such cases helped shape James VI's attitudes toward women accused of witchcraft.

On 10 October 1577, a royal messenger, Robert Binning, was sent from Edinburgh to summon Margaret Murray, Lady Clackmannan (another sister of Catherine Murray, Lady Abercairney and the Countess of Mar), the Laird of Abercairny and his wife Catherine Murray, and others to appear before the Privy Council on 18 October. Binning also brought the summons for the assize (trial) of Violet Mar, scheduled for 24 October.

Violet Mar was brought to trial and convicted on 24 October 1577.

== Apology from Scottish government ==
In March 2022 Nicola Sturgeon, the first minister of Scotland, apologized for the persecution of alleged witches during the 16th, 17th, and 18th centuries. The Scottish government had not apologized previously.
