= Dreher Island State Park =

State park in South Carolina, United States

- Location within South Carolina
- Nearest city: Chapin, South Carolina
- Coordinates: 34°4′56″N 81°24′13″W
- Area: 348 acres (1.4 km^{2})
- Created: 1990
- Camp sites: Regular campgrounds, primitive boat-in, and RV sites are available
- Hiking trails: 3
- Website: southcarolinaparks.com/dreher-island

Dreher Island State Park is in central South Carolina roughly 30 miles (48 km) from the state's capital of Columbia. It occupies all of the largest island in 50,000-acre (202 km^{2}) Lake Murray, a reservoir of the Saluda River.

The park offers boating, hiking, camping, fishing for largemouth bass and other fish, picnic areas and spaces for large group meetings. The park also contains several lodging options, including villas and cabins.

It was first leased from SCE&G (now SCANA) in 1970, who built the Dreher Shoals Dam, creating Lake Murray. Today it is a largely heavily wooded island with the only access being a bridge on its Northern side.

The park is named after the former owner of island, Billy Dreher.

== See also ==
- List of South Carolina state parks
