= Listed buildings in Kirkby Stephen =

Kirkby Stephen is a civil parish in Westmorland and Furness, Cumbria, England. It contains 52 listed buildings that are recorded in the National Heritage List for England. Of these, one is listed at Grade II*, the middle of the three grades, and the others are at Grade II, the lowest grade. The parish contains the market town of Kirkby Stephen and the surrounding countryside. Most of the listed buildings are shops, houses, and associated structures in the town. The River Eden flows through the parish, and two bridges crossing it are listed. The other listed buildings include a church and a portico at the entrance to the churchyard, a former grammar school, a church hall, hotels, a barn, a former Temperance Hall, a bridge crossing a former railway, a war memorial, and a bank.

== Key ==
Grade	Criteria
II*	Particularly important buildings of more than special interest
II	Buildings of national importance and special interest

== Buildings ==
Name and location	Photograph	Date	Notes	Grade
St Stephen's Church; 54.47426°N 2.34842°W		c. 1230	The church was altered and extended during the following centuries, including building the tower in the early 16th century. The chancel and east chapels were rebuilt in 1847–51 by R. C. Carpenter, and the nave and aisles were rebuilt in 1871–74. The church is built in stone on a plinth, with buttresses. The nave has a copper-sheathed roof, and the chancel has a slate roof with a low parapet, stone copings, and an apex cross. The church consists of a nave with a clerestory, north and south aisles, chapels, transepts, a chancel, and a west tower. The tower has three stages, a west doorway, and an embattled parapet with pinnacles. On the south side of the church is an 18th-century sundial.	II*
Former Grammar School; 54.47410°N 2.34764°W	—	1566	The former school is in stone on a chamfered plinth, with a band and a stone-flagged roof with stone coped gables. There are two storeys, and in the west front are a plank door, sash windows, and blocked openings. The south gable end contains a restored Perpendicular window with a hood mould, and on the apex is a bellcote.	II
35 Market Square; 54.47356°N 2.34922°W	—	1636	Originally an inn, later a house, it was altered in 1830. The house is stuccoed with a stone-flagged roof, three storeys and a front of 1 1/2 bays. Above a through passage with a four-centred head is a dated lintel, and the windows are sashes.	II
Frank's Bridge; 54.47343°N 2.34653°W		17th century	A footbridge crossing the River Eden, it is in stone and consists of two segmental arches with a central pier and a cutwater. The footpath is 4 feet 9 inches (1.45 m) wide, and the parapet has stone copings.	II
Lowmill Bridge; 54.47629°N 2.34831°W	—	c. 17th century	The bridge carries Hartley Road over the River Eden. It is in stone and consists of two segmental arches with a central pier and a cutwater. The bridge has flat parapets, and a horizontal band.	II
Mitre House; 54.47327°N 2.34816°W		1663	A stone house with a pebbledashed front, stuccoed end pilasters hiding quoins, and a slate roof. There are 2 1/2 storeys and a symmetrical front of three bays. The central doorway has panelled pilasters, a dated lintel, and a cornice. The windows are sashes with stuccoed surrounds.	II
1 The Green; 54.47504°N 2.34816°W	—	1666	A cottage that was enlarged into a house, it is in pebbledashed stone with a slate roof. There are two storeys and a symmetrical front of three bays. In the centre is a 20th-century flat-roofed porch, and above it is an inscribed square panel. The windows are sashes, and above a rear door is a dated lintel.	II
The Manor House; 54.47211°N 2.34655°W	—	1672	A house in stone with a green slate roof, two storeys, and sash windows, later subdivided into two dwellings. The main part has a roof with stone copings, and a symmetrical front of five bays. Steps lead up to a central door with an architrave and a segmental pediment. The smaller part to the right is later, and has quoins, moulded eaves, and a hipped roof. There are two bays and a 20th-century pebbledashed lean-to extension containing a re-set 18th-century door with an architrave and a dated and initialled lintel.	II
Church Hall; 54.47413°N 2.34780°W	—	18th century	Originally part of the grammar school, it is in stone with moulded quoins, a moulded cornice, and a slate roof. There are two storeys and a symmetrical west front of five bays. The central doorway has a rectangular traceried fanlight, a cornice, and a pediment, and the windows are sashes. In the east wall is a re-set datestone.	II
Shop at northeast corner, Market Square; 54.47358°N 2.34831°W		18th century	The shop is in stone with chamfered quoins and a hipped slate roof. It has three storeys with cellars, and on the west front facing the square are two bays, with a shop front in the ground floor and sash windows above. On the north front are four bays, three doors, and sash windows, some of which are blocked.	II
Shop at southwest corner, Market Square; 54.47325°N 2.34889°W	—	18th century	Two properties combined into one in the 20th century, both with two storeys, and projecting into the square. The older part, at the south, was the Old Grammar School. It is in stone, with a rounded corner, partly stuccoed, and with a stone-flagged roof. On the east side is a gabled porch, and a small window in the gable above, and on the south side are sash windows, two in the ground floor and one above. The other property is dated 1819, it is pebbledashed, and has a slate roof with stone copings. In the ground floor is a 19th-century shop front that projects to the east and the north, and in the upper floor are two windows in the east front and four windows in the north front.	II
Shop to north of Mitre House; 54.47338°N 2.34826°W	—	18th century	The shop is pebbledashed on a plinth, with corner pilasters, a shaped gable, and a slate roof. There are 2 1/2 storeys and a west front of two bays. In the ground floor is a 19th-century shop front, and in each of the upper floors are two sash windows in stucco surrounds. In the south front is a stair window with flat stone mullions, and more sash windows.	II
Gate and railings, The Manor House; 54.47214°N 2.34683°W	—	18th century	The railings and central gate in front of the garden are in cast iron. The standards have pointed foliate heads, and on the gate posts are urns.	II
Sleddall House and railings 54.47345°N 2.34907°W		Late 18th century	A stuccoed house on a chamfered plinth, in Georgian style, with a band, a corner pilaster on the right, and a slate roof. There are three storeys and a symmetrical front of five bays. The central doorway has a rectangular fanlight and a cornice, and the windows are sashes. In front of the house are cast iron railings with spearhead standards and decorative finials, and the central gate is in wrought iron.	II
Redmayne House; 54.47450°N 2.35029°W		1787	The house was later extended to the rear, and in the 19th century a wing was added. It is in stone and has a slate roof with stone copings. The main front is symmetrical with three storeys and three bays. The central door has an architrave, a rectangular fanlight, and a cornice on consoles. Flanking the door are canted bay windows, and in the upper floors are sash windows with segmental heads.	II
Croft House and adjacent shop 54.47318°N 2.34889°W		1789	Originally part of a large house, later subdivided, it is stuccoed with quoins and a slate roof. There are three storeys and seven bays. In front of the north part are cast iron railings, behind which is a Tuscan porch, and in the upper floors are sash windows. At the south end in the ground floor is a projecting shop window, recessed doors, and a sash window. There are four sash windows in the middle floor and four trompe-l'œil windows in the top floor. Above these is a cornice on corbels.	II
Brougham House; 54.47018°N 2.35016°W	—	1794	A stone house with a stuccoed front, quoins, and a slate roof with stone copings. There are two storeys and a symmetrical front of three bays. In the centre is a round-headed doorway with a stone surround, a projecting keystone, and a fanlight, and the windows are sashes.	II
House behind 16 Market Street; 54.47374°N 2.34936°W	—	1795	The house is in stone with a slate roof, two storeys and four bays. It has a re-used doorcase dated 1719, with reeded and fluted engaged columns, a dated lintel, and an open segmental pediment. The windows have timber lintels.	II
23 and 25 Market Square; 54.47324°N 2.34849°W		Late 18th or early 19th century	A stone shop with bands, moulded eaves, and a hipped slate roof. It has three elevations, with angled corners, 2 1/2 storeys with cellars, and a symmetrical north front with two bays. On this front are two bow windows, a door on each corner, and fluted wooden Roman Doric columns carrying a continuous cornice. In the upper floors are sash windows with stone surrounds.	II
16 and 18 Market Street; 54.47371°N 2.34903°W	—	Late 18th or early 19th century	Two shops in rendered stone. No. 16 has a stone-slate roof, 2 1/2 storeys, bands, a cornice, a shop front in the ground floor, and sash windows above. It is joined to No. 14 by an arch with moulded quoins and voussoirs. No. 18 to the left has quoins and a slate roof, three storeys, three bays, a shop front and sash windows.	II
4 Melbecks; 54.47143°N 2.34739°W	—	Late 18th or early 19th century	A pebbledashed cottage with a stone-flagged roof, two storeys and three bays. It contains a plank door and sash windows with projecting stone sills.	II
King's Arms Hotel; 54.47305°N 2.34839°W		Late 18th or early 19th century	A hotel in rendered stone with chamfered quoins at the south end, and a slate roof, hipped at the south end. There are three storeys with cellars, and six bays. The doorway has a Tuscan porch carrying a two-storey bay window, and above the door is a rectangular fanlight. To the left of the doorway is a bow window, and the other windows are sashes with stone surrounds.	II
The Cloisters, railings and gates 54.47365°N 2.34855°W		1810	This forms a portico at the entrance to the churchyard of St Stephen's Church, and is in red stone with a slate roof. On the front are eight unfluted Roman Doric columns on plinth blocks. The central four columns project forward and carry an entablature with a triglyph frieze and a triangular pediment containing an inscription. On the apex of the pediment is a bellcote with a cornice and a ball finial with a cross. On the rear wall is a stone bench, and associated with the portico are decorative iron railings and gates.	II
27 Market Square; 54.47327°N 2.34903°W	—	1818	A stone shop with a stone-flagged roof, three storeys and three bays. In the ground floor is a 20th-century shop front, and there is a single sash window in each of the upper floors.	II
61 Croft Street; 54.47202°N 2.34888°W		Early 19th century	A stone shop with quoins and a slate roof. There are two storeys and two bays. In the ground floor are two shop windows, one incorporating a door, and above them is a cornice carried on brackets. In the upper floor are two sash windows.	II
3 Market Street; 54.47428°N 2.34893°W	—	Early 19th century	A stone shop with chamfered quoins and a slate roof. There are three storeys and three bays. In the ground floor are a shop front, a shop window, and a door, and in each of the upper floors are three sash windows with stucco surrounds.	II
13 Market Street; 54.47405°N 2.34892°W	—	Early 19th century	A shop at right angles to the road, in stone with quoins and a stone-flagged roof. It has three storeys. In the ground floor is a shop front with a timber cornice on scrolled consoles. In the middle floor are three sash windows with triangular heads and cast iron barley sugar half-columns that have ornate capitals. In front of these is a cast-iron railing. The top floor contains a single triangular-headed sash window and a cast-iron window box. Above these, the gable has decorative bargeboards and a finial.	II
14 Market Street; 54.47384°N 2.34915°W	—	Early 19th century	A shop in rendered stone with quoins and a slate roof. It has two storeys and two bays, with a 20th-century shop front in the ground floor and casement windows with stone surrounds above.	II
28 Market Street; 54.47297°N 2.34883°W	—	Early 19th century	A two-storey shop, the ground floor stuccoed, the upper floor pebbledashed, and the roof slated with stone copings. In the ground floor is a projecting embattled shop front that has a door with a fanlight to the left and sash windows on the sides. The upper floor contains a three-light sash window with a stucco surround.	II
32 Market Street; 54.47288°N 2.34877°W	—	Early 19th century	A stuccoed shop with quoins on the north end, and a slate roof. There are three storeys and two bays. In the ground floor is a doorway with a semicircular fanlight and a projecting shop window to the right, and in each of the upper floors is a single sash window.	II
34 Market Street; 54.47284°N 2.34876°W	—	Early 19th century	A stuccoed shop with a slate roof. There are three storeys and two bays. Steps lead up to a ground floor doorway with a semicircular fanlight, and there is a projecting shop window to the right. In each of the upper floors is a single sash window.	II
36 Market Street; 54.47281°N 2.34879°W	—	Early 19th century	A stuccoed shop with a slate roof, three storeys and two bays. At the left end are chamfered quoins in the ground floor and a pilaster above. The ground floor contains a doorway with a semicircular fanlight and a projecting shop window to the right. There are two sash windows in each of the upper floors.	II
40 Market Street; 54.47260°N 2.34882°W	—	Early 19th century	A stuccoed shop, much altered, with a rusticated pilaster to the south, and a slate roof. There are three storeys, two bays, a shop front in the ground floor, and a two-storey bay window above.	II
41 North Road; 54.47445°N 2.34889°W	—	Early 19th century	A stone shop with a slate roof, three storeys and three bays. In the ground floor is a shop window with a sash window to the left, and in each upper floor are three sash windows with stucco surrounds.	II
43 North Road; 54.47438°N 2.34891°W	—	Early 19th century	A stone shop with quoins at the south corner and a slate roof. It has three storeys, two bays, a modern shop front in the ground floor, and sash windows in stone surrounds above.	II
Barn, Faraday Road; 54.47209°N 2.34950°W		Early 19th century	The barn is in stone with quoins and a roof of slate and stone flags. There are two storeys. The main door has a segmental arch, this has been filled and a door and window inserted. In the upper floor are two openings with segmental heads and keystones.	II
Black Bull Hotel; 54.47271°N 2.34882°W		Early 19th century	The hotel is in stone with a slate roof, and has three storeys and four bays. The north bay is stuccoed, and contains a segmental-headed carriage entrance with voussoirs. The other three bays are symmetrical on a plinth, with rusticated end pilasters. There is a central Tuscan porch and a door with a rectangular fanlight. The windows are sashes with stucco surrounds.	II
Eden Lodge; 54.47321°N 2.34698°W	—	Early 19th century	Originally a brewery, later a house, it is in stone, partly pebbledashed, with a slate roof. The west front has two storeys, the east front has three storeys and three bays, and there is a lean-to at the south. In the east front is a large segmental-headed doorway, and the windows are sashes.	II
Gates and railings, Fletcher House; 54.47191°N 2.34872°W	—	Early 19th century	The cast iron railings and gates enclose the garden to the front of the house. The standards have foliate trilobes, and the gates, which are in the centre and at the sides, have moulded finials.	II
Gate and railings, Mitre House; 54.47328°N 2.34831°W	—	Early 19th century	The railings include a central gate, they are in cast iron, and enclose the garden at the front of the house. They are ornate with balusters, scrolled infill, standards, and finials.	II
Pennine Hotel; 54.47335°N 2.34903°W		Early 19th century	The hotel is in stone with quoins, and it has a roof of concrete tiles. There are three storeys and three bays, and at the south end is a passage to the rear. On the front is a central doorway, there is one casement window, and the other windows are sashes.	II
Stobars Hall; 54.47536°N 2.35898°W	—	1829	A country house that was extended in 1866 with the addition of a north wing and two towers, and crenellation was added to the parapet. The house is in stone with moulded quoins and slate roofs. It is mainly in two storeys, it has an L-shaped plan, and there are embattled towers to the south and the west. The east front has six bays, the central four bays projecting forward. On the front is a Tuscan porch, and the windows are sashes.	II
Fletcher House; 54.47191°N 2.34889°W	—	1837	A stone house with chamfered quoins and a slate roof. It has two storeys and a symmetrical front of three bays. Two steps lead up to a central door that has a Tuscan doorcase, a traceried fanlight, a frieze containing a rosette, and a cornice. Flanking the door are canted bay windows with Tuscan columns in the angles. The windows are sashes.	II
36 Market Square; 54.47357°N 2.34898°W	—	19th century	A shop projecting at right angles into the square, it is stuccoed and has a stone-flagged roof. There are three storeys, two bays on the south front, and one on the east front. In the ground floor is a continuous projecting shop window on both fronts; this has slender Tuscan columns and a cornice. In the south front are three sash windows and one casement window, and in the east front is a first floor bay window.	II
2 and 3 Nateby Road; 54.47145°N 2.34806°W	—	19th century	A pair of mirror-image pebbledashed houses in a terrace with a slate roof. Each house has three storeys, two bays, a door with a fanlight in the outer bays, and sash windows. The doors and windows have stone surrounds.	II
39 North Road; 54.47449°N 2.34887°W	—	Mid 19th century	Originally two houses at right angles, later combined and used as a restaurant. It is in stone with slate roofs, there are two storeys, and the building has an L-shaped plan, each part having three bays. In the north front is a central doorway, and in the west front is a shop window. The windows are sashes.	II
House to east of Temperance Hall; 54.47136°N 2.34790°W	—	19th century	The house is in stone with a stuccoed front on a plinth, and chamfered quoins on the right corner. There are three storeys and two bays. Steps lead up to a doorway with pilasters on blocks, a rectangular fanlight, and a cornice. The windows are sashes in stone surrounds, and on the right side is a window with a semicircular head.	II
Temperance Hall; 54.47140°N 2.34795°W		1856	The hall is in ashlar stone on a plinth with rusticated end pilasters, a cornice and a parapet. It is in a single tall storey and has a symmetrical front of three bays. Steps lead up to a central doorway that has an architrave on blocks, a rectangular fanlight, a lintel, and a segmental pediment on scrolled console brackets. In a semicircular-headed niche above is a statue of Temperance. Each of the outer bays contains a tall window in an architrave with a cornice on scrolled consoles. The parapet contains lettering, and above it is a large datestone.	II
Rail overbridge 54.46234°N 2.35610°W	—	1860–61	The bridge carries the A685 road over the railway. It was built for the South Durham and Lancashire Union Railway, and is in puddingstone with sandstone dressings. The bridge consists of five arches with voussoirs, carried on piers with imposts. It has a continuous cornice, a dressed parapet, and abutment piers with quoins and projecting capping.	II
North Lodge, Stobars Hall; 54.47667°N 2.35798°W	—	Late 19th century	The lodge was extended to the rear in the 1940s. It is in stone with a hipped stone-flagged roof. The windows are mullioned, and in front of the lodge is a verandah carried on rusticated timber columns.	II
Barclay's Bank and railings 54.47291°N 2.34839°W		1903	The bank has two storeys with two gables above, and a front of four asymmetrical bays. The ground floor is in ashlar with a corbel table and buttresses, the upper floor is pebbledashed with a central ashlar corbelled-out chimney stack, the gables are slate-hung, and the roof is slated. The gables have bargeboards on scrolled brackets and finials. In the ground floor are two doorways with fanlights, one rectangular and the other with a segmental head, and two bow windows. In the upper floor and the gables are multi-light windows. In front of the area are decorative wrought iron railings.	II
War memorial 54.47344°N 2.34850°W		1920	The war memorial stands in Market Square. It is in Lazonby sandstone, and consists of a cross pattée variant on a tapering shaft, an octagonal plinth, and a three-stepped octagonal base. Around the plinth and on the base are bronze plaques with inscriptions and the names of those lost in the two World Wars.	II
