= Little Murray River =

Little Murray River may refer to:

- Little Murray River (New South Wales), an anabranch of the Murray River, Australia; to the north
- Little Murray River (Victoria), an anabranch of the Murray River, Australia; to the south
- Little Murray River (Nymboida), a tributary of the Nymboida River

== See also ==
- Murray River (disambiguation)
