= Kirkby Stephen Parish Church =

The Parish Church, Kirkby Stephen
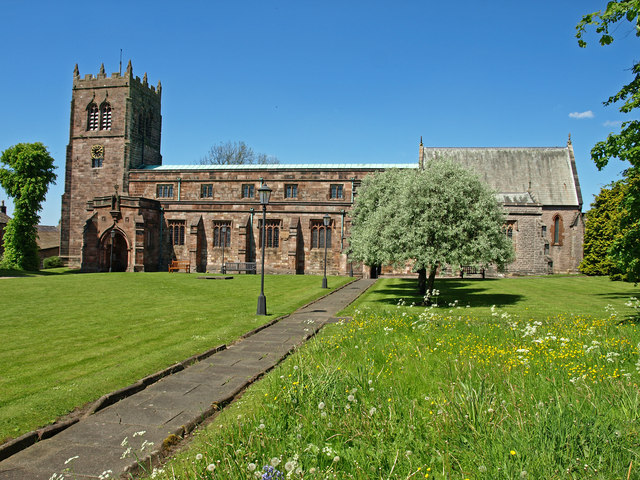
- The Parish Church, Kirkby Stephen
- The Parish Church, Kirkby Stephen
- 54°28′26.28″N 2°20′54.79″W
- OS grid reference: NY 77517 08821
- Location: Kirkby Stephen
- Country: England
- Denomination: Church of England
- Churchmanship: Broad Church / Central

History
- Dedication: None; St Stephen or St John possible former dedications.

Architecture
- Heritage designation: Grade II* listed

Administration
- Province: Province of York
- Diocese: Diocese of Carlisle
- Archdeaconry: Carlisle
- Deanery: Appleby
- Parish: Kirkby Stephen with Mallerstang and Crosby Garrett with Soulby

Clergy
- Priest: Canon Brendan Giblin

Kirkby Stephen Parish Church is a parish church of the Church of England, located in Kirkby Stephen, Cumbria. The church is sometimes called "St Stephen's Church", possibly by analogy to the name of the town, but there is no evidence of a formal dedication to Saint Stephen. It is a Grade II* listed building.

== History ==
The church is approached from Kirkby Stephen market square, where it is almost hidden from view by the cloisters, built in 1810. It is sometimes called the "Cathedral of the Dales" and, in Cumbria, only Kendal Parish Church is larger.

There have been three churches on this site. The first was built in the Anglo-Saxon era, and part of a cross shaft bearing a relief of Loki, the Norse god, shown bound and chained, survives from this period. The Anglo-Saxon church was replaced in 1170 by a Norman church, and walling from this period survives in the west wall of the north aisle.

The church was mostly rebuilt again in c. 1230, but has been significantly altered since; the main thirteenth-century survivals are the nave arcades, the north transept, and the piscina and sedilia in the chancel. The south aisle windows and south door were replaced in the fifteenth century, and the tower was built in the sixteenth century. The chancel, the chapels flanking it to north and south, and the south transept were rebuilt in 1847; the north wall of the north aisle and the south porch were rebuilt in 1871. The clerestory and south aisle windows were also renewed in the nineteenth century, and much of the internal stonework was renewed or reworked.

The church has no official dedication. There is no factual basis to support a dedication to St Stephen or the rumoured previous dedication to St John. However, the church is sometimes referred to as 'St Stephen's Church', with reference to the place-name of Kirkby Stephen.

== Parish ==
The church is in a joint parish with St Andrew's Church in Crosby Garrett and St Mary's Church in Mallerstang. The church is also the home of the Roman Catholic congregation, following an official sharing agreement entered into in 1990.

== Memorials ==
The north, or Wharton, chapel has a late sixteenth-century altar tomb with effigies of Thomas Wharton, 1st Baron Wharton (1495–1568) and his 2 wives.

The south, or Hartley, chapel has an early fifteenth-century altar tomb with an effigy of Sir Richard Musgrave (died 1409), and a fifteenth-century altar tomb to Sir Richard Musgrave (died 1464). It is dedicated to St Paul.

== Organ and bells ==
The church contains a three manual pipe organ dating from 1888. A specification of the organ can be found on the National Pipe Organ Register.

The church has a ring of 8 bells, with the tenor weighing 15 cwt and tuned to F; all except the 7th bell were cast by John Warner & Sons of London in 1877, the 7th was cast by Edward Seller in 1849.

== Gallery ==
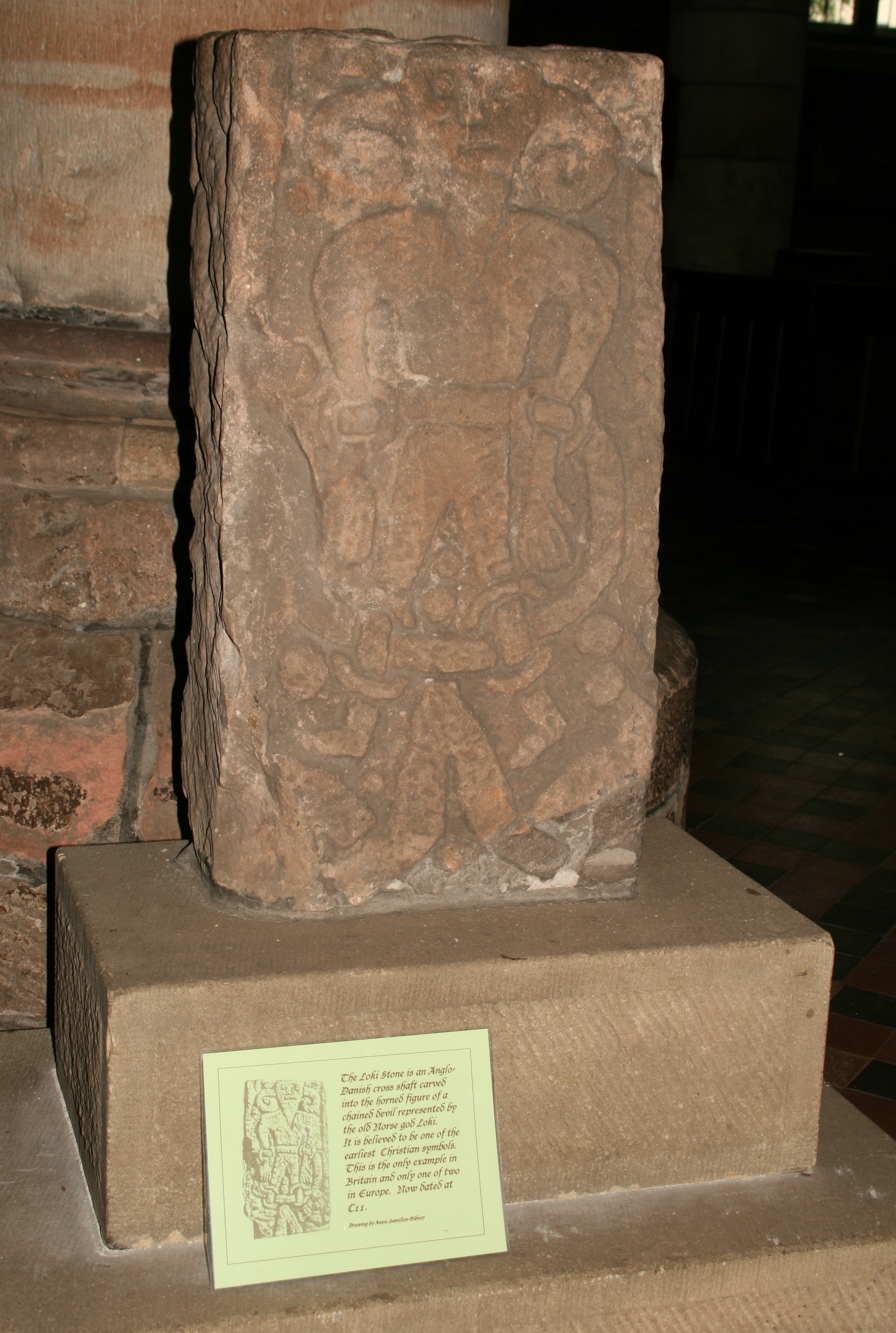
The "Loki Stone", part of an Anglo-Saxon cross shaft

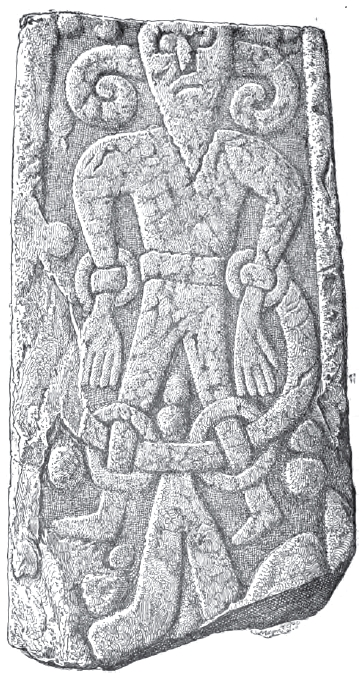
Engraving of the "Loki Stone" by Julius Magnus Petersen

== See also ==
- Grade II* listed buildings in Westmorland and Furness
- Listed buildings in Kirkby Stephen
