= Françoise d'Avantigny =

Françoise d'Avantigny, Mademoiselle de La Touche was a maid of honour in Scottish household of Mary of Guise in the 1530s and 1540s.

Her mother, Renée d'Avantigny, Mademoiselle de la Touche was the governess of the maids of honour at court of James V and Mary of Guise, a position equivalent to the English mother of the maids. Her father was probably Urbain de la Touche who had the position of carver in household of Mary of Guise, and the names "Monsieur d'Avantigny" and "La fille de M. de la Tousche" appear on household rolls. The family, sometimes known as "la Tousche d'Avrigny", came from the Touraine region of France. Avrigny was an estate at Saint-Gervais-les-Trois-Clochers.

In December 1544, during the war known as the Rough Wooing, Françoise came to Carlisle with Katherine Campbell. Campbell's daughter Annabell Murray was also a maid of honour, and Campbell's husband William Murray of Tullibardine had established contact with an English border official Thomas Wharton. Wharton wrote that Françoise intended to come to England to plead for the release of her father who had been captured at the siege of Boulogne.

Françoise tried to obtain a passport from the Earl of Shrewsbury to come to England. Her mother, Renée d'Avantigny, went to Paris and negotiated for her husband's release from the English-held Château de Guînes. She wrote to Mary of Guise mentioning plans for Françoise to marry a son of Monsieur de Chillac (in Saintonge), but her father's captivity affected their financial position. She also mentioned her disapproval of the fashions worn at the French court.

Françoise's father was released in April 1546 but still owed a ransom. He hoped to return to Guise's household, but died in September 1547. His mother claimed the family property, and Renée d'Avantigny wrote to Mary of Guise hoping she could help with her debts by giving her his back pay. She also wrote to Jacques de La Brosse to enlist the support of the Duchess of Guise. In October 1548, Renée hoped to join the household of Mary, Queen of Scots in France.

Françoise married the Sieur de La Guerinière at Précigné. She wrote herself to Mary of Guise, regretting the years passed since leaving her company.
