= Robert Douglas, 1st Viscount Belhaven =

Scottish courtier

Coat of Arms of Robert Douglas

Robert Douglas, 1st Viscount Belhaven PC (1573 – 14 January 1639), was a Scottish courtier.

== Family background ==
The second son of Malcolm Douglas of Mains (executed 1584), by Janet Cunningham, daughter of John Cunningham, of Drumquhassil.

== Career ==
His older brother fought a duel with the brother of Oliver Leigh of Addington, who was avener of the royal stables, and was killed. Robert Douglas was given his brother's place at court, and became Master of the Horse to Prince Henry, a Gentleman of the Bedchamber to James VI and I and Charles I and Master of the Household to Charles I.

Douglas was sent with to France with a gift of horses in July 1607. He was knighted on 7 February 1609, and took a letter to Prince Henry's friend, John Harington, who was in Italy. He led the horse of state at Prince Henry's funeral in December 1612. In July 1616 he went to France with Lord Hay.

He was sworn of the Scottish Privy Council. In 1633, on the coronation of Charles I, he was raised to the Peerage of Scotland as Viscount of Belhaven, in the County of Haddington.

== Family ==
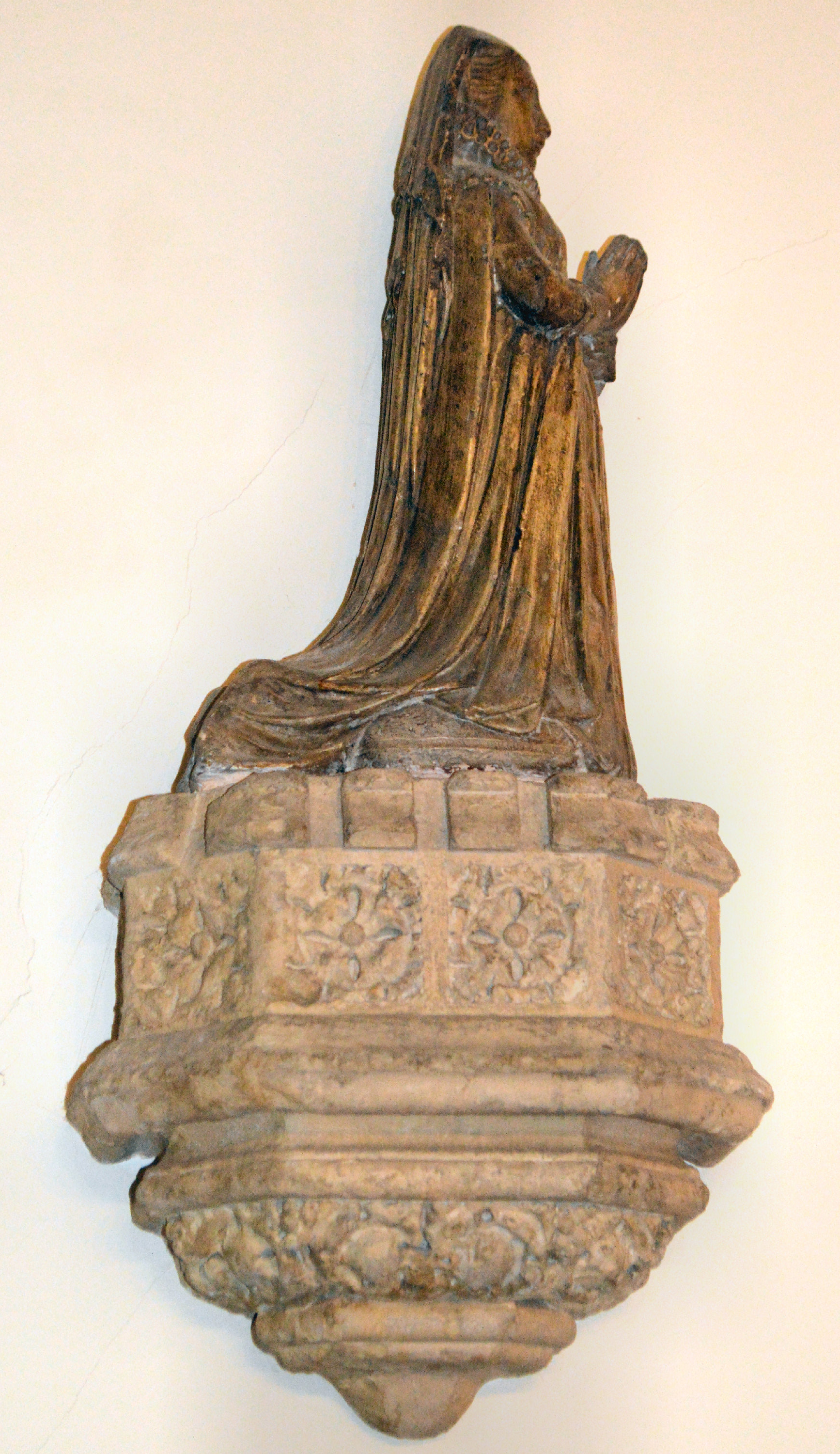
Fragment from the monument to Nicola Moray, Lady Belhaven, Savoy Chapel

Lord Belhaven married Nicola Moray, daughter of Robert Murray of Abercairny, in June 1610. She died in childbed in November 1611.

Belhaven had two children by his mistress, Elizabeth Whalley the sister of Edward Whalley, who was subsequently to be a regicide. They were both legitimised by Act of Parliament when he became a viscount at Charles I's coronation in 1633.

His son John is assumed to have predeceased him, but his daughter Susanna Douglas married her cousin, Robert Douglas of Blackerston. On his death, his estate including the Gorbals Mansion House passed to his nephew and son-in-law. Lord Belhaven died at Edinburgh in January 1639 and was buried in Holyrood Abbey in Edinburgh where his monument remains today. As he had no sons the viscountcy died with him.

Peerage of Scotland
New creation	Viscount of Belhaven; 1633–1639	Extinct
