= William S. Murray (engineer) =

American engineer

William Spencer Murray, Sr. (August 4, 1873 – January 9, 1942) was an American engineer. Lake Murray in South Carolina is named after him.

== Biography ==
He was born August 4, 1873, in Annapolis, Maryland. He was the fourth child of Elizabeth Murray Spencer and James Daniel Murray. Murray graduated from Lehigh University in 1895 with a degree in electrical engineering. While at Lehigh, Murray was a member of Chi Phi, Sword and Crescent (senior honorary society), and E. E. Society.

Murray began his career as an apprentice at the Westinghouse Electric plant in East Pittsburgh, Pennsylvania. He rose through the positions of testing room engineer, construction engineer on the road, district engineer of New England, and sales engineer before becoming an independent electrical engineering consultant based out of Boston from 1902 to 1905. As a consulting engineer, he was the chief engineer for the electrification of the New York, New Haven and Hartford Railroad.

He married Ella Day Rush on May 26, 1905, in Catskill, New York, and they had three sons, Richard Murray, John Murray, and William Spencer Murray, Jr. He formed the engineering firm McHenry & Murray with E.H. McHenry in 1913 and in 1915 completed the New Haven electrification, then became involved in hydroelectric development on the Housatonic River in Connecticut. Murray entered the Housatonic Power Co. as assistant to the president, afterward becoming president himself. When the company merged into the Connecticut Light & Power Company, Murray became the new corporation's chief engineer.

By 1921, he was a senior member of the engineering firm Murray & Flood with Henry Flood, Jr. Murray & Flood were retained by T.C. Williams in 1923 to develop hydroelectric power plants in South Carolina, which resulted in the Saluda Dam. The lake created by the dam was named Lake Murray after him.

Murray died January 9, 1942. His widow died in 1943.

== Published works ==
- Electrification Analyzed, and its practical application to trunk line roads, inclusive of freight and passenger operation (OCLC 44574633; American Institute of Electrical Engineers, 1911)
- A Superpower System for the Region Between Boston and Washington (US Government Print Office, 1921)
- Government Owned and Controlled Compared with Privately Owned and Regulated Electric Utilities in Canada & the United States with Henry Flood, Jr. (National Electric Light Association, 1922)
- Superpower: Its Genesis and Future (OCLC 381643; McGraw-Hill, 1925)

== Awards and honors ==
- Murray held memberships in the American Institute of Electrical Engineers and Engineers' Club of New York.
- 1916: Howard N. Potts Medal, for his work in main line electricity
