= Murray Lake =

Murray Lake may refer to:

- Murray Lake (Manitoba)
- Murray Lake (Michigan)
- Murray Lake (Saskatchewan)

== See also ==
- Lake Murray (disambiguation)
