= Simon Grahame =

Soldier, scholar, Franciscan (1570–1614)

Simon (or Simion) Grahame (c. 1570–1614), born in Edinburgh, Scotland, led a dissolute life as a traveller, soldier, and courtier on the Continent of Europe. He appears to have been a good scholar, and wrote the Passionate Sparke of a Relenting Minde, and Anatomy of Humours, the latter of which is believed to have suggested to Robert Burton his The Anatomy of Melancholy. He became an austere Franciscan.

A sonnet of Grahame's was published as part of the preface to the Tragicall Death of Sophonisba, by David Murray, Scoto-Brittaine, John Smethwick, London (1611).
