= Lake Murray Country =

County in South Carolina, USA

Coordinates: 34.068°N 81.314°W

Lake Murray Country is a large area of South Carolina, United States; the region includes the counties of Newberry, Saluda, Lexington, and Richland. The towns of Lexington and Irmo are usually considered to be part of it.

The region's focal point is Lake Murray. Lake Murray's name comes from its chief engineer William S. Murray. The Saluda Dam supplies a large portion of the power to South Carolina. The dam was the largest earthen dam in cubical content for power purposes in the world at its time of creation.
