= Thomas Wharton, 1st Baron Wharton =

English nobleman (1495–1568)

Sir Thomas Wharton, 1st Baron Wharton (1495 – 23 August 1568) was an English nobleman and a follower of King Henry VIII. He is best known for his victory at Solway Moss on 24 November 1542 for which he was given a barony.

== Early life ==
He was born in Wharton, Kirkby Stephen, Westmorland, the eldest son of Sir Thomas Wharton of Wharton Hall and his wife Agnes Warcup, daughter of Reynold or Reginald Warcup of Smardale. His younger brother was the English martyr Christopher Wharton. His father died around 1520, and in April 1522 he served on a raiding expedition into Scotland.

== Officer on the Scottish border ==
On 10 February 1524 he was placed on the commission for the peace in Cumberland, and on 20 June 1527 he is said to have been knighted at Windsor. To the parliament that met on 3 November 1529, Wharton was returned for Appleby, but on the 9th he was pricked for High Sheriff of Cumberland. On 30 June 1531 he was appointed commissioner for redress of outrages on the Anglo-Scottish Border. On 6 February 1532 he was made Justice of the Peace for the East Riding of Yorkshire, and on 19 March for Northumberland, and he was usually included in the commissions for Cumberland and Westmorland.

In 1531 he purchased the manor of Healaugh, near Tadcaster where he resided for the latter part of his life.

=== Official posts ===
In 1532 he appears to have been captain of Cockermouth, and, as comptroller, was associated with Henry Percy, 6th Earl of Northumberland in the government of the border marches. This followed the grant in 1530 of the hereditary lieutenancy of Cockermouth by Northumberland, part of a package of gifts designed to allow Wharton to take over military duties from the ailing Northumberland, and they would remain closely associated until his death. On 29 June 1534 Northumberland recommended Wharton's appointment as captain of Carlisle, and on 9 July he was commissioned to inquire into the 'treasons' of William Dacre, 3rd Baron Dacre of Gilsland, against Northumberland; Dacre was brought to trial, but acquitted by his peers. On 22 November 1535 Wharton was again appointed sheriff of Cumberland.

During the northern rebellions of 1536 Wharton remained loyal to Henry VIII. In October 1536 the rebels marched on his house at Kirkby Stephen to force Wharton to join them, but he had escaped and joined the Duke of Norfolk, under whom he served during the troubles; he was one of the king's representatives at the conference at York on 24 November, with Robert Aske and his followers. His appointment as Warden of the West Marches was suggested as a reward for his services; but Norfolk instead recommended Henry Clifford, 1st Earl of Cumberland, for the post. Wharton was, however, on 28 June 1537 appointed deputy warden, and in the same year was acting as a visitor of monasteries in Cumberland. He was unpopular with the older nobility, being one of the new men on whom the Tudors relied; Robert Holgate, as President of the Council of the North, commented on the disdain of his neighbours. On 17 November 1539 he was for the third time appointed sheriff of Cumberland; on 14 May 1541 he sent Henry an account of the state of Scotland, and on 22 October the king ordered reprisals for the burning of some barns near Bewcastle by the Scots; two days later he added the captaincy of Carlisle to his office of deputy warden, and on 3 January 1542 he was returned to parliament as knight of the shire for Cumberland.

=== Battle of Solway Moss ===
During 1542 both English and Scots were preparing for war, and Wharton submitted a plan for raiding Scotland and seizing the person of James V at Lochmaben; the council, however, disapproved of the idea. Wharton burnt Dumfries on 5 October, and on 23 November made another raid, doing as much damage as he could. Meanwhile, the Scots had planned an extensive invasion of the west marches, of which Wharton was kept informed by spies. At supper on the 23rd he received definite information of an impending attack on the morrow: the Scots were said to be fourteen (or even twenty) thousand strong, while Wharton could only muster a few hundred men. With these he watched the progress of the Scots over the River Esk during the 24th; towards evening he attacked their left; under Oliver Sinclair, the Scots became entangled in Solway Moss at the mouth of the river. Many including nobles were taken prisoner, killed, or drowned, while the English loss was small. Before the Privy Council had heard of his victory at Solway Moss, on 30 November they wrote requesting Wharton to review the building works of the Moravian military engineer Stefan von Haschenperg at Carlisle. On 12 December 1542, the Council read his official report of the battle.

=== The Rough Wooing ===
In 1543 Wharton was occupied with forays into Scotland, and with intrigues to win over disaffected Scots nobles and obtain control of the south-west of Scotland. For his services in these matters and at Solway Moss he was early in 1544 raised to the peerage as Baron Wharton, and in letters of the period was called "Lord Wharton." Exactly how this happened was the subject of later interest.

Wharton's intelligence network included a Scottish woman, Katherine Robinson. She came to him at Carlisle Castle in February 1543, at the start of the war known as the Rough Wooing and said that the Laird of Buccleuch was willing to capture Mary, Queen of Scots and bring her to him. Wharton was worried the Scottish queen would be harmed if Buccleuch or the Earl of Bothwell kidnapped her. The Duke of Suffolk advised him to give Buccleuch a non-committal answer. Wharton also gathered intelligence from William Murray of Tullibardine and his wife Katherine Campbell. She brought Françoise d'Avantigny to Carlisle to obtain a passport.

In 1544, Wharton acted as a commissioner to draw up terms and bonds of assurance with the disaffected Scots for an English invasion, and the marriage of Mary, Queen of Scots and Prince Edward, which the Parliament of Scotland had rejected. Wharton held musters at Keswick and Penrith in March 1544. In April the Earl of Hertford gave him particular instructions to carefully entertain offers of alliance from Lord Maxwell and his heir, Robert, and Lord Fleming. Robert Maxwell offered to hand over Lochmaben Castle and three other strongholds; Caerlaverock Castle, "Langhole" and Threave Castle. Wharton kept guard at Carlisle, as Warden of the West March, while the Earl of Hertford burnt Edinburgh in May 1544. Later in May 1544 border troops were sent to accompany Henry VIII to France, but Wharton was refused leave to join them on the grounds that he could not be spared from the marches. Wharton then helped plan a "Warden raid" on Jedburgh, which was led by William and Ralph Eure. Border forays and intrigues with Angus, Glencairn, Lord Maxwell, and others, who professed to desire the marriage of the Mary Queen of Scots to Edward, occupied Wharton for the rest of Henry VIII's reign.

In December 1546 Wharton wrote to Wriothesley about gold-mining in Scotland at Crawford Moor, and offered to investigate the ground. Wharton recalled a conversation with the Scottish ambassador Adam Otterburn, who said that James IV had mines but only found loose pieces of gold or gold ore rather than a vein, and spent more on the work than he recovered. The Duke of Albany also opened mines. Wharton owned a gold medallion coined by Albany, said to be minted from Scottish gold.

=== War under Edward VI ===
With the accession of Edward VI the War of the Rough Wooing continued, with effort being made by Somerset as Lord Protector to complete the marriage, and a Scottish raid in March 1547 provided a pretext for his invasion. On the 24th the council asked Wharton for two despatches, one giving an exact account of the raid, the other exaggerating the number of raiders and towns pillaged. The latter was intended to justify English reprisals, in the eyes of the French king, and prevent his giving aid to the Scots. In September following, while Somerset invaded Scotland from Berwick-upon-Tweed, Wharton and the Earl of Lennox created a diversion by an incursion on the west. They left Carlisle on the 9th, with two thousand foot and five hundred horse, and on the 10th captured Milk Castle; on the following day Annan, and on the 12th Dronok, both surrendered, but on the 14th they returned to Carlisle, explaining their lack of further success by lack of supplies. Wharton was excused attendance at the ensuing session of parliament, his presence being needed on the borders.

In the autumn William Grey, 13th Baron Grey de Wilton was appointed Warden of the East Marches, but his relations with Wharton were strained, and led eventually to a challenge from Henry Wharton to Grey, though Somerset on 6 October 1549 forbade a duel. Their joint invasion of Scotland in February 1548 was a failure. Wharton and Lennox left Carlisle on the 20th, sending on Henry Wharton to burn Drumlanrig and Durisdeer. Wharton himself occupied Dumfries and Lochmaben, but on the 23rd a body of 'assured' Scots under Maxwell, who accompanied Henry Wharton, changed sides, joined Angus, and compelled Henry Wharton, with his cavalry, to escape across the mountains. News was brought to Carlisle that the whole expedition had perished, and Grey, who had penetrated as far as Haddington, retreated. In reality the Scots, after their defeat of Henry Wharton, were themselves thrown back by his father; many were captured or killed, but Wharton was forced to retreat, and Dumfries again fell into Scottish hands. In revenge for Maxwell's treason, Wharton hanged his pledges at Carlisle, and so initiated a lasting feud between the Whartons and the Maxwells.

After Somerset's fall in October 1549 Wharton's place as warden was taken by his rival, Baron Dacre; but early in 1550 Wharton was appointed a commissioner to arrange terms of peace with Scotland and afterwards to divide the debatable land. He was one of the peers who tried and condemned Somerset on 1 December 1551. On 8 March 1552 the council effected a reconciliation between Wharton and Dacre; and when, in the following summer, Northumberland secured his own appointment as lord-warden-general, Wharton was on 31 July nominated his deputy-warden of the three marches.

== Under Queen Mary ==
On Edward VI's death Dacre sided at once with Queen Mary I, and it was reported that Wharton was arming against him; but Mary, saying she disbelieved the accusations against him, continued him in the office of warden, while his eldest son became one of the queen's trusted advisers. Dacre was, however, appointed warden of the west marches, Wharton continuing in the east and middle marches, and residing mainly at Alnwick. Wharton's own sympathies were conservative in religious matters; he had voted against the Clergy Marriage Act 1548, against the Act of Uniformity 1548 for the destruction of the old service books, and against the Act of Uniformity 1552, though he had acted as chantry commissioner under the Dissolution Act 1547.

In spite of advancing years, Wharton retained his wardenry throughout Mary's reign, the Earl of Northumberland being joined with him on 1 August 1557 when fresh trouble with the Scots was imminent (owing to the war with France). In the parliament of January 1558 a bill was introduced into the House of Lords for punishing the behaviour of the Earl of Cumberland's servants and tenants towards Wharton, but it did not get beyond the first reading.

== Later life ==
In June 1560 Norfolk, then lieutenant-general of the north, strongly urged Wharton's appointment as captain of Berwick-upon-Tweed, his restoration to the west marches being impossible because of his feud with Maxwell, who was now friendly to the English; but the recommendation was not adopted. He saw no further service, died at Healaugh near Tadcaster on 23 or 24 August 1568, and was buried there on 22 September. His will was proved at York on 7 April 1570, and there were monuments to him at Healaugh near Tadcaster and St Stephen's Church, Kirkby Stephen.

== Family ==
Wharton was twice married: first, before 4 July 1518, to Eleanor, daughter of Sir Bryan Stapleton of Wighill, near Healaugh; and, secondly, on 18 November 1561, to Anne, second daughter of Francis Talbot, 5th Earl of Shrewsbury and widow of John Braye, 2nd Baron Braye, by whom he had no issue. By his first wife he had;

- Thomas Wharton, 2nd Baron Wharton
- Sir Henry Wharton, a dashing leader of horse, who served in many border raids, was knighted on 23 February 1547–8 for his services during the expedition to Durisdeer, led the horse to the relief of Haddington in July 1548, and died without issue about 1550, having married Jane, daughter of Thomas Mauleverer, and later wife of Robert, 6th Baron Ogle;
- Joanna, wife of William Penington of Muncaster, ancestor of the Barons Muncaster.
- Agnes, who married, (1) Richard Musgrave. Their daughter Eleanor Musgrave (1546-1623) married the diplomat Robert Bowes, (2) Humphrey Musgrave of Hayton Castle in Cumbria.

== Legacy ==
Thomas Wharton was the founder of Kirkby Stephen Grammar School.

== Notes ==
Attribution

This article incorporates text from a publication now in the public domain: "Wharton, Thomas (1495?-1568)". Dictionary of National Biography. London: Smith, Elder & Co. 1885–1900.

Peerage of England
New creation	Baron Wharton; 1544–1568	Succeeded by Thomas Wharton
