= Jacques de La Brosse =

French diplomat, soldier (~1485–1562)

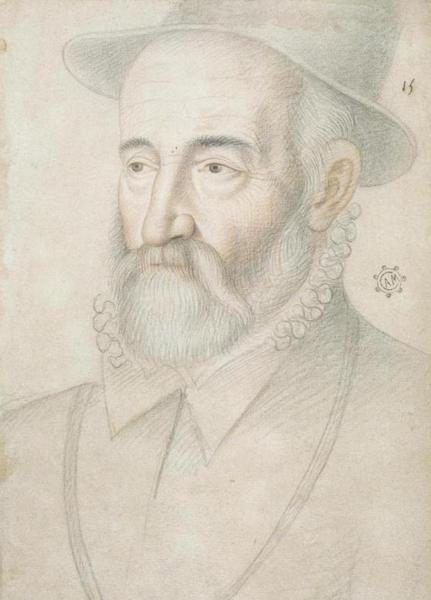
Portrait of Jacques de La Brosse by François Clouet

Jacques de La Brosse (c. 1485–1562), cupbearer to the king, was a sixteenth-century French soldier and diplomat. He is remembered in Scotland for his missions in 1543 and 1560 in support of the Auld Alliance.

== Tutor of the Duke of Longueville ==
Mary of Guise, wife of James V of Scotland, appointed Jacques de La Brosse as a tutor managing the affairs of her son, François, Duke of Longueville (died 1551). His French estates neighboured those of Mary's Master of Household, Jean de Beaucaire, and his wife Guyonne de Breüil. After the death of the Duke, La Brosse was a Master Household and gentleman counsellor to the Duke of Guise.

== Mission of 1543 ==
After the death of James V, Scotland was ruled by Regent Arran. His regency was challenged by David Beaton and Matthew Stewart, 4th Earl of Lennox. Lennox even threw doubt on Arran's legitimacy. His grounds were the complex legal circumstances of Arran's father’s second marriage. The Auld Alliance was threatened by an agreement, the Treaty of Greenwich, which would lead to Mary, Queen of Scots marrying Prince Edward.

Into this troubled situation Francis I of France sent a diplomatic mission and military aid to support the alliance between France and Scotland. Two French envoys, Jacques de La Brosse and the lawyer, Jacques Ménage, seigneur de Caigny, with the Papal Legate Marco Grimani, Patriarch of Aquileia, brought money and munitions to Dumbarton Castle on 6 October 1543, and unwittingly delivered them to Lennox. According to the later narratives of Claude Nau and John Lesley, they arrived in 5 ships with 60,000 crowns. Nau and Lesley wrongly give the name of the legate as the nuncio, Pierre Francis Contareni, Patriarch of Venice, but mention another colleague, 'James Anort', meaning James Stewart. There were seven ships and James Stewart of Cardonald, a Scots Guard officer who escorted La Brosse and Ménage, told Beaton that the envoys were "na grett personages" who had brought "sellvar and artellyery monesyzonis pekes and halberdes."

La Brosse and Ménage then met with Arran, Mary of Guise, and Beaton, mostly at the Palace of Stirling Castle. On 24 November 1543, they sent a report of their mission to Francis I of France with 23 articles detailing what they had seen, heard and resolved. Much of this concerns the activities of Lennox, who was to be humoured in his ambition to marry Mary of Guise. La Brosse and Ménage undertook to search the registers of the Scottish Parliament in order to find a loophole to invalidate the Treaty of Greenwich. Ralph Sadler, the English ambassador, has no comment on these proceedings, he had taken refuge at Tantallon Castle and Arran sought his expulsion from Scotland. Mary of Guise's mother, Antoinette de Bourbon recommended he should become the tutor of Mary's son, Francis, Duke of Longueville. Jacques was still in Scotland in December 1545, and left on Scottish business to meet Francis I at Saint-Germains in February 1546. Jacques said Antoinette was there, with nothing to occupy her except hunting and designing buildings.

After the death of her husband in September 1547, Renée d'Avantigny wrote to Mary of Guise hoping she could help with her debts by giving her his back pay. She also wrote to Jacques de La Brosse to enlist the support of the Duchess of Guise. In 1548, Jacques de La Brosse was part of the mission to bring Mary, Queen of Scots, to France.

== Mission of 1558 - 1560 ==
Jacques de La Brosse served as a soldier at Metz, in Italy and at Calais. From 1558, during the Scottish Reformation, Jacques was stationed in Scotland as a captain of French troops. He was made a knight of the Order of Saint Michael. Jacques and Nicolas de Pellevé, Bishop of Amiens, wrote letters summoning the rebelling Lords of the Congregation to attend the Queen Regent in October 1559. As there was no response by 13 November, Francis II of France and Mary instructed them to offer a pardon to all who would submit and punishment to those remaining obstinate. A similar commission which also included Jean de Monluc, Bishop of Valence, was issued on 1 April 1560.

When the English were preparing to intervene in the Scottish Reformation crisis in January 1560, Jacques wrote to the Duke of Norfolk, saying that he could not believe a rumour in Edinburgh that Norfolk was lieutenant-general to attack the French and aid the Protestant rebels. An English fleet, commanded by William Winter began to harass shipping in Firth of Forth. An English herald, Chester Herald, William Flower denied all knowledge of the raider to Mary of Guise on 16 February 1560. Jacques and Henri Cleutin spoke in defiance to Flower, and he asked if Jacques would be an envoy into England. Jacques replied he had heard the English army were coming into Scotland and he would then "give them the looking upon." At the conclusion of hostilities on 15 July 1560, Jacques signed a guarantee for the French evacuation of Leith.

French troops had invested the town of Leith and it was besieged by a Scottish and English army. A French journal of the siege and events from 22 January 1560 to 15 June, by an anonymous author, mentions the activities of Jacques de La Brosse in passing. La Brosse advised Henri Cleutin, sieur d’Oisel, on tactics on 6 April, and Guise on diplomacy. The journal, edited in its original French and translated by Gladys Dickinson in her Two Missions of de la Brosse is an important source for the Siege of Leith and corroborates details found in English letters and Knox’s History of the Reformation.

Jacques married Françoise de Moussy-la-Contour-de-Puybaillard, their children included a daughter Euchariste. Jacques became a knight of the Order of Malta. He was killed at the battle of Dreux in 1562. Pierre de Bourdeille, seigneur de Brantôme wrote that Jacques was the most graceful and gracious man-at-arms that was ever seen.

== Manuscripts ==
The manuscript of the Journal of the siege of Leith, and Mary of Guise's correspondence with the French ambassador Michel de Seure are held by the Archives des affaires étrangères, Paris, (Angleterre 15). This material, and an archive known as the Balcarres Papers, held by the National Library of Scotland, possibly represent the papers of one of the secretaries of Mary of Guise, Pierre de Grantrie or Grandrye.
