= Bill Murray (footballer, born 1898) =

English footballer

Personal information
- Full name: William Murray
- Date of birth: 1898
- Place of birth: Southchurch, England
- Position: Inside forward

Senior career*
Years	Team	Apps	(Gls)
1918–1919	Eldon Lane		
1919–1920	Bishop Auckland		
1920–1921	Derby County	31	(3)
1921–1923	Middlesbrough	15	(1)
1923–1934	Heart of Midlothian		
1934	Dunfermline Athletic		
Total		46	(4)
- * Club domestic league appearances and goals

William Murray (1898–unknown) was an English footballer who played in the Football League for Derby County and Middlesbrough.
