= William Murray (died 1562) =

Scottish landowner

William Murray of Tullibardine (1510–1562) was a Scottish landowner.

== Family background ==
He was a son of William Murray and Margaret Stewart. His mother was a daughter of John Stewart, 1st Earl of Atholl, and Eleanor Sinclair. His father rebuilt Tullibardine Chapel and sent hart horns from Tullibardine to Edinburgh for the costumes of "wild men" at the tournament of the Wild Knight and the Black Lady. He was killed at the battle of Flodden in 1513.

== Career ==
William Murray inherited the main family residence at Tullibardine Castle, in the village of Tullibardine, 2 miles (3.2 km) north of Auchterarder, Perth and Kinross, from his grandfather (also William Murray) in 1525.

During the war with England known as the Rough Wooing, William Murray and his wife Katherine Campbell communicated with Thomas Wharton at Carlisle. In July 1543, he signed the "Secret Bond", a protest against the policies of Regent Arran which led to Mary, Queen of Scots moving from Linlithgow Palace to Stirling Castle.

He was subsequently an opponent of the party of Cardinal Beaton in Scotland and became a member of the Lennox faction. Murray attacked the Cardinal's baggage train at Dunning in May 1544, and took his silverware. According to John Lesley, Murray sailed to Chester with Earl of Lennox and the Bishop of Caithness after the Burning of Edinburgh in 1544.

In December 1544, Wharton forwarded a newsletter written by Katherine Campbell to the Earl of Lennox so he could show it to the council of Henry VIII, although Murray suggested it should first be edited and "sundry vain words might be razed forth". Wharton told Murray it was a "wise letter convenient in all points to be seen". Murray hoped that Lennox could effect a reconciliation between Mary of Guise and the Earl of Bothwell.

Katherine Campbell planned to come to Carlisle with her friend, a French maid of honour from the household of Mary of Guise. The French woman, Mademoiselle "Latushowe" (Françoise d'Avantigny, Mme de la Touche), intended to come to England to plead for the release of her father who had been captured at the siege of Boulogne. Françoise's mother Renée had been governess of the maids of honour at the Scottish court. Murray told Wharton that his wife Katherine and Lennox's sister Helen Stewart, Lady Erroll were now "much cherished" by Mary of Guise. The Privy Council of Scotland ordered Katherine to remain at Tullibardine Castle, and she petitioned to be allowed to visit her husband's other properties and houses.

The Privy Council of England made William Murray custodian of his brother David "in ward", as David Murray was not thought to be an ally of England and the Earl of Lennox. William Murray was summoned to London in April 1546, his own loyalty to the English cause was questioned, and he was sent to the Fleet Prison. Thomas Bishop later wrote that David Murray was sent to the Tower of London and Tullibardine was "half a year" in the Fleet.

According to Alexander Crichton of Brunstane (or John Cockburn of Ormiston), the Parliament of Scotland considered forfeiting William Murray for his dealings at Carlisle. Apparently forgiven by the Scottish council, Murray obtained a reward of £25 and a passport from Henry VIII to return to Scotland in September 1546.

Murray was sympathetic to the Scottish Reformation. He was one of the Scottish aristocrats who accompanied Mary of Guise to France and England in 1550 at the conclusion of the Rough Wooing. In 1560, he was one of Lords of the Congregation who opposed Guise and French rule in Scotland. He signed a commission for the Treaty of Berwick which facilitated the entry of an English army into Scotland to fight at the siege of Leith.

He died in 1562.

== Marriage and children ==
Murray married Katherine Campbell of Glenorchy, daughter of Sir Duncan Campbell of Glenorchy (d. 1513) and Margaret Moncreiffe. She would have known Madame La Tousch and the sisters of the Earl of Lennox in the household of Mary of Guise. Their children included:

- Annabell Murray, who was a maiden of honour in the household of Mary of Guise, and married John Erskine, Earl of Mar (died 1572). She looked after the young James VI and Prince Henry at Stirling Castle.
- Eufame Murray, who married (1) Robert Stewart, (2) Robert Pitcairn, Commendator of Dunfermline
- William Murray of Tullibardine (died 1583), father of John Murray, 1st Earl of Tullibardine
- Alexander Murray of Drumfin (died 1596), who married Isobel Redheuch of Cultybraggan, a granddaughter of the Comptroller of Scotland, James Redheuch of Tullichettle.
- James Murray of Pardewis (died 1592). He was made Edinburgh's customs official in August 1567, and was said by John Knox to have challenged the Earl of Bothwell to single combat in Edinburgh after the murder of Lord Darnley and at the battle of Carberry Hill. The Earl refused.
- Catherine Murray, who married Robert Murray of Abercairny
- Margaret Murray, who married Robert Bruce of Clackmannan.
- Jean Murray, who went to France with Mary of Guise as a lady in waiting or maid of honour in 1550, and married James Henderson of Fordell in 1560.

Lady Clackmannan and Lady Abercairny were dames of honour in the household of Prince Henry at Stirling.
