= Tullibardine Chapel =

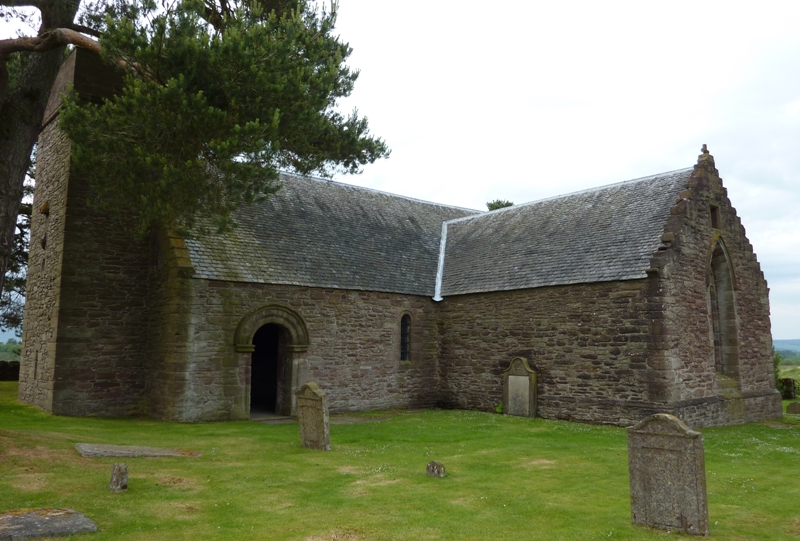
- 2009 view, looking northeast
- Tullibardine Chapel
- 56°18′04″N 3°45′50″W
- Location: Tullibardine, Perth and Kinross
- Country: Scotland

Architecture
- Architect: David Murray, Baron of Tullibardine
- Completed: 1446 (580 years ago)

Tullibardine Chapel is an ancient church building in Tullibardine, Perth and Kinross, Scotland. It is one of the most complete medieval churches in Scotland. A large part of it dating to 1446, it is now a scheduled monument.

The chapel was built by Sir David Murray, Baron of Tullibardine (formerly of Ochtertyre), of Tullibardine Castle, as a family chapel and burial site. Members of the Murray family (subsidiaries of the Dukes of Atholl) were buried there until 1900. An armorial plaque on the north external wall of the chancel displays the coat of arms of David and his wife, Isabel Stewart.

The chapel was rebuilt or extended with transepts and a small tower around 1500 by David's grandsons, William Murray (died 1513), who built the "part towards the west where his father's coat of arms is impaled," and Andrew Murray. Arms on the south transept gable relate to the marriage of Andrew Murray and Margaret Barclay. They were ancestors of the Murrays of Balvaird family.

The chapel has remained unaltered to this day.

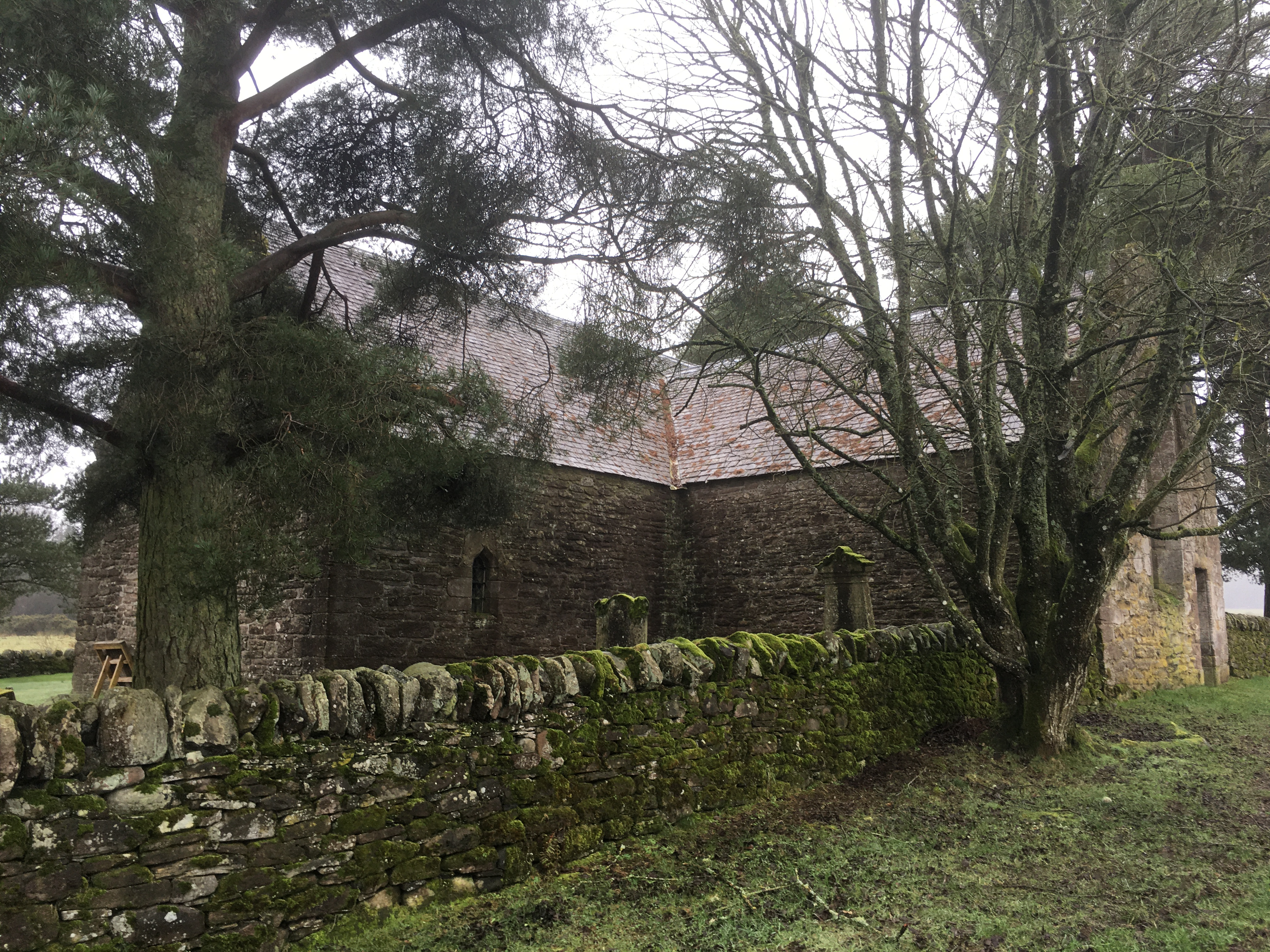
Looking southwest

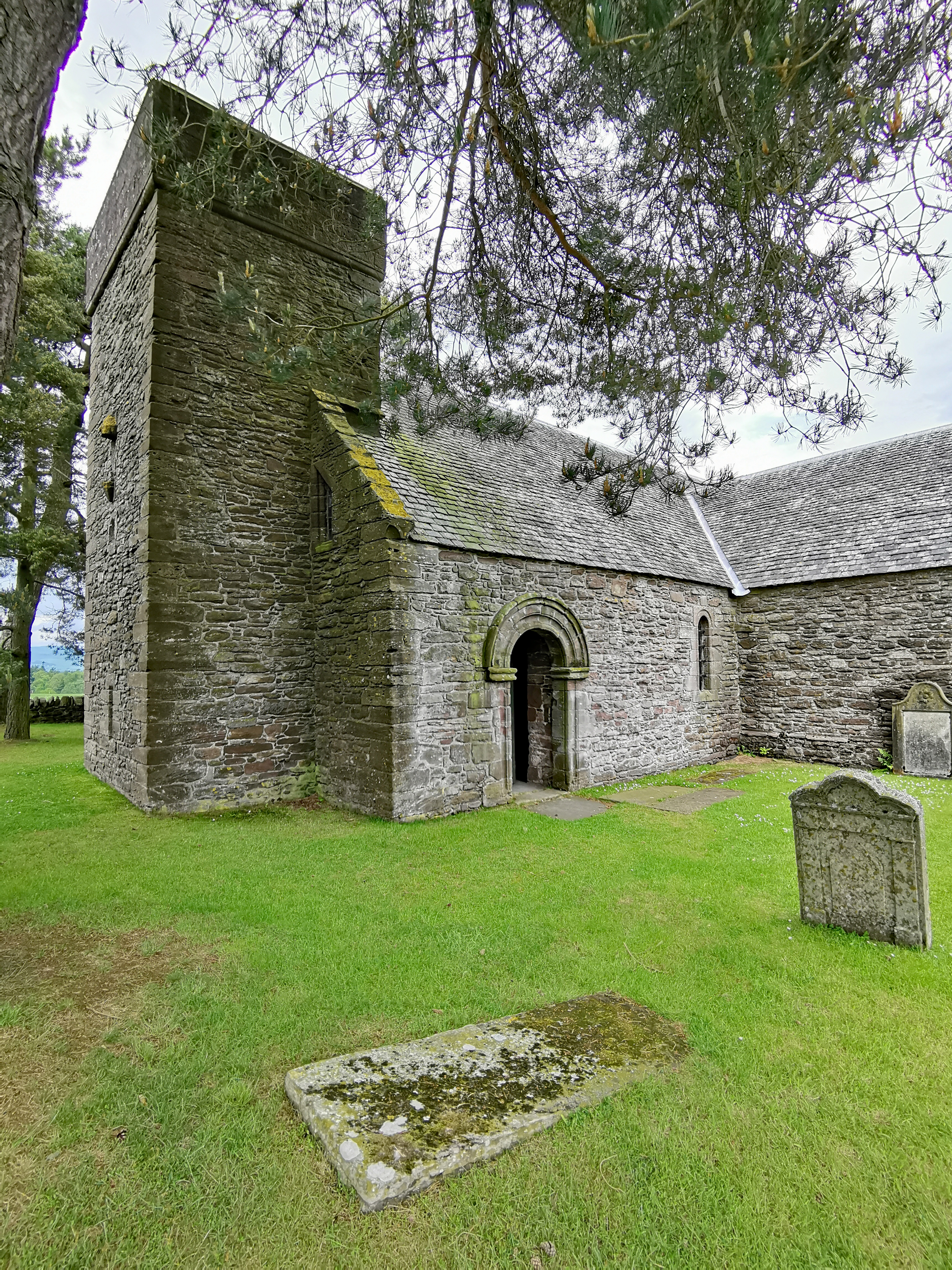
Looking northwest

== See also ==
- Scheduled monuments in Perth and Kinross
