= Murray Bridge =

Murray Bridge may refer to:

- Murray Bridge, South Australia, a city and locality
- Rural City of Murray Bridge, a local government area in South Australia
- Corporate Town of Murray Bridge, a former local government area in South Australia

== See also ==
- Murray Bridge Airport, an airport in South Australia
- Murray Bridge railway station, a railway station in South Australia
- Murray Bridge Speedway, a speedway venue in South Australia
- Murray Bridge Training Area, a military training area in South Australia
- Murray Bridge Tunnel, a railway tunnel in South Australia
- Murray Bridge East, South Australia
- Murray Bridge North, South Australia
- Murray Bridge South, South Australia
- Murray (disambiguation)
