= William S. Murray (judge) =

American jurist, politician and novelist (1916–1998)

Justice of the North Dakota Supreme Court
- In office 1966
- Appointed by: Fred G. Aandahl
- Preceded by: Thomas J. Burke
- Succeeded by: William Paulson

Member of the North Dakota House of Representatives
- In office 1949–1950

Personal details
- Born: 26 December 1916 Bismarck, North Dakota, U.S.
- Died: 30 November 1998 (aged 81)
- Education: University of North Dakota (BS); Defense Language Institute

William Stanton Murray (26 December 1916 – 30 November 1998) was an American lawyer, judge, politician, and novelist who served as both a justice of the North Dakota Supreme Court and a member of the North Dakota House of Representatives.

== Biography ==
William Stanton Murray was born on 26 December 1916 in Bismarck, North Dakota. His early education took place in the public schools of Mott, North Dakota. He attended the University of North Dakota, graduating in 1939 with a Bachelor of Science.

After being admitted to the North Dakota Bar, Murray began to practice law in Bismarck.

From 1 April 1941 until 6 February 1946, Murray served in the Second World War. From 1 November 1950 until 5 March 1953, he served in the Korean War.

Murray briefly worked for the Central Intelligence Agency (CIA) in Washington, D.C. in 1947.

In 1951, Murray graduated from the Army Language School (today known as the Defense Language Institute) in Monterey, California.

Murray served as a member of the North Dakota House of Representatives in 1949 and 1950.

In 1953, Murray served as an assistant attorney general. He served as special assistant attorney general from 1957 until 1964.

On 1 April 1966, a 49-year-old Murray was appointed to the Supreme Court to fill the vacancy left by the death in office of Thomas J. Burke. With Burke's unexpired term ending months later, Murray ran for a full term. However, he was defeated in election. His tenure on the court was only nine months.

After leaving the bench, Murray worked as the general counsel of the Montana-Dakota Utilities Corporation from 1967 through 1976.

Song of the Dusty Stars, a novel written by Murray, was published in 1985.

Murray died at the age of 81 on 30 November 1998.
