= Lake Murray (South Carolina) =

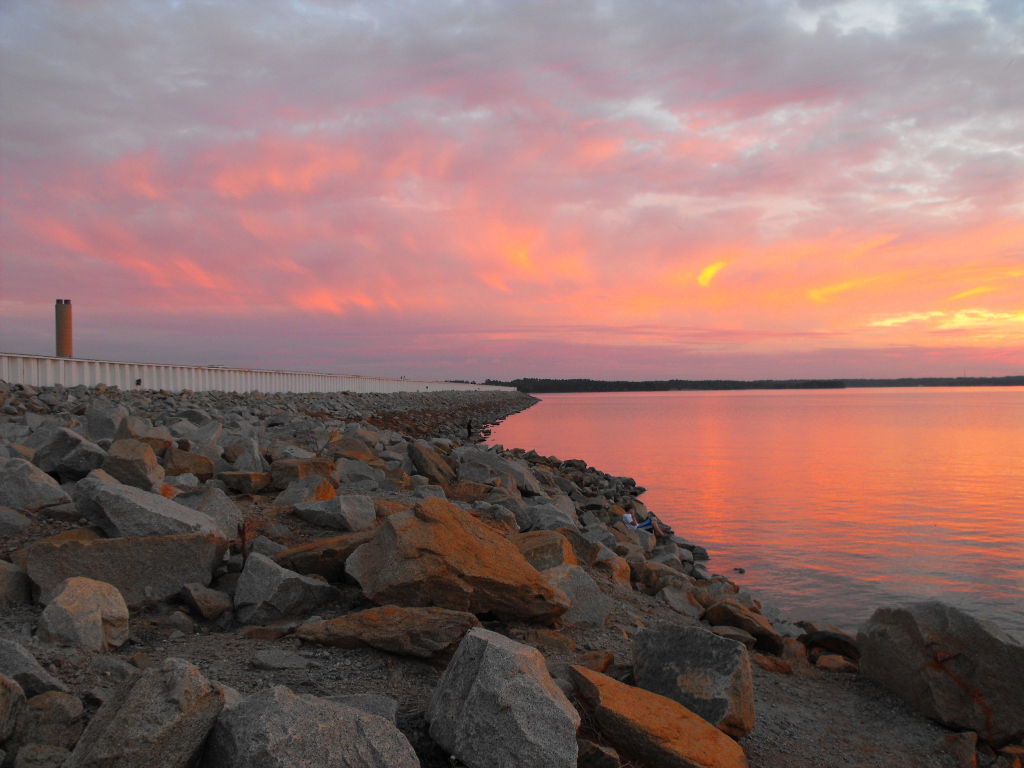
- Lake Murray from the dam

- Location within South Carolina
- Location: Lexington / Newberry / Saluda / Richland counties, South Carolina, United States
- Coordinates: 34.065795°N 81.328968°W
- Type: Reservoir
- Primary inflows: Saluda River
- Primary outflows: Saluda River
- Basin countries: United States
- Max. length: 41 mi (66 km)
- Max. width: 14 mi (23 km)
- Surface area: 50,000 acres (200 km^{2})
- Max. depth: 189.6 ft (57.8 m)
- Shore length^{1}: 650 mi (1,050 km)
- Surface elevation: 360 ft (110 m)
- ^{1} Shore length is not a well-defined measure.

Lake Murray is a reservoir in South Carolina, US. It is approximately 50,000 acres (20,000 hectares) in size, and has roughly 650 miles (1,050 kilometres) of shoreline. It was impounded in the late 1920s to provide hydroelectric power to the state of South Carolina. Lake Murray is fed by the Saluda River, which flows from upstate South Carolina near the North Carolina state line. The Saluda Dam (officially the Dreher Shoals Dam) was an engineering feat at the time of its construction. The dam, using the native red clay soil and bedrock, was the largest earthen dam in the world when it was completed in 1930. Lake Murray itself is named after the project's chief engineer, William S. Murray. The Saluda Dam is approximately 1.5 mi (2.4 km) long and 220 feet (67 m) high. Lake Murray is 41 mi (66 km) long, and 14 mi (23 km) wide at its widest point. At the time when the lake was finished, it was the world's largest man-made reservoir.

In addition to serving as a source of hydroelectric power for the region, the lake has become a recreational attraction, with fishing and boating being popular activities. Also, Dreher Island State Recreation Area, located in the western part of the lake, provides multiple activities—all focused on the lake.

== History ==
=== Early settlement ===
The Saluda River was named after the Saluda Indian tribe, which lived along the banks of the river. For reasons unclear, the Saluda tribe migrated to Pennsylvania beginning in the early 18th century and were replaced by Cherokee from the north.

Settlement built in 1800

Same house on sonar in 2005

The lower Saluda River valley was settled in the early 1750s by German and Swiss emigrants. The region had two major settlements: the Dutch Fork (located on the fork of the Broad River and the Saluda River) and the Saxe-Gotha township.

In 1755, the Cherokee signed a peace treaty with the British and the Cherokee withdrew from the area, leaving much of the land for open settlement. The Dutch Fork was the most densely settled, becoming home to 483 settler families by 1760. It has been estimated that by the year 1765 there were about 8,000 Germans and German-Swiss and an additional 1000 Moravians of German origin who had come to the province of South Carolina. A total of 9000 Germans was the number or 8.4% of population in 1765.

Because of this common nationality and language, the Dutch Fork community remained very cohesive and somewhat isolated through the years. Today, the surnames of area reflect this: Sligh, Bickley, Cannon, Drafts, Lindler, Amick, Corley, Shealy, Sease, Bouknight, Bowers, Rikard, Kinard, Koon, Summer, Wise, Dreher, Derrick, Dominic, Geiger, Epting, Frick, Huffstetler, Oxner, Wessinger, etc. Many of these family groups live on land that is under the original land grant from the King of England still today. During the American Revolution, the Dutch Fork area was mostly patriot, unlike the surrounding regions that held large groups of English settlers. The only major engagement of the Revolution that was fought in the vicinity occurred in the nearby town of Ninety-Six, located up the Saluda River. It was the first land battle south of New England in the war.

The Saluda River was a strategic boundary, and since there was no bridge on the river at that time, the ferries near the Dutch Fork area were vital to the movement of troops and material westward toward the frontier. The most important of these ferries were Wyse's Ferry and Kimpson's Ferry.

During the American Revolutionary War, Hessian mercenaries came to South Carolina to fight for the British. Many of them had been pressed into the service and brought to the Colonies against their will, and therefore many deserted the army and found shelter in German settlements such as the Dutch Fork. Today, many locals know of specific ancestors that were brought to fight the young United States and became citizens.

Wyse's Ferry Bridge in 1919

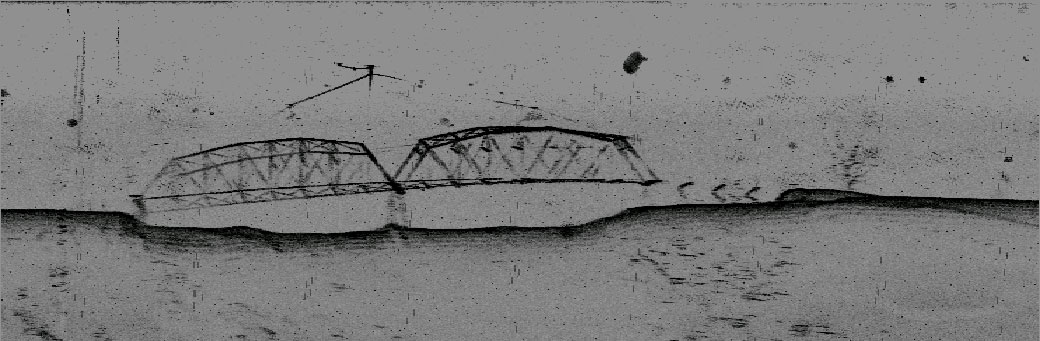
Sonar image of bridge in 2005

After the war ended, things in the Dutch Fork returned to peaceful normalcy until the American Civil War. When South Carolina became the first state to secede from the Union, numerous volunteer regiments were created entirely from people in these settlements.

By 1928, about 5,000 people were living in the Saluda River valley. The community included 3 churches, 6 schools, and 193 graveyards.

=== Hydroelectric power ===
There had been interest in water power generation on the Saluda River for more than a hundred years. As the demand for electricity in the developing Southern United States increased, it became apparent that harnessing the flow of large rivers such as the Saluda would be needed.

In 1904, Lexington Water Power Company was incorporated by G.A. Guignard of Columbia, South Carolina. The company acquired the flowage rights on the Saluda River from Dreher Shoals to 20 miles (32 km) upstream. Originally, two dams were considered to be built, one at Dreher Shoals, which was approximately 10 miles (16 km) west of Columbia, and the other at Bear Creek, five miles (8.0 km) upstream. However, in 1907 the company sold the lands necessary for construction of the lower dam at Dreher Shoals to James W. Jackson, of Augusta, Georgia and W. T. Van Brunt of New York.

Between 1908 and 1911, ownership of the Dreher Shoals property shifted several times but it was eventually purchased by the Richland Public Service Company, a subsidiary of Columbia Railway, Gas & Electric Company.

Since 1916, a man named Thomas Clay Williams had been proposing the development of hydroelectric power on the Saluda, Santee and Cooper rivers in South Carolina, but his propositions did not generate much serious interest. T. C. Williams was not an engineer, and his belief that massive power could be generated from the swamps and coastal plains of the state did not meet much enthusiasm with the leading engineers of South Carolina. It was not until the plans were brought before an engineer from New York, William Spencer Murray, that an engineer truly realized Williams's dream and its potential.

William S. Murray was an engineer with much experience in electric power systems and generation. In 1920, Congress authorized Murray to head a study undertaken by the United States Geological Survey for the establishment of a large-scale electric power grid in the industrial northeast. He also had been the chief engineer on the project to electrify the New Haven Railroad out of New York City.

Once Williams came to Murray to make his proposal in 1923, Murray and his partner, Henry Flood Jr., pored over topographic maps of the region and worked on estimates. It looked as if they might be able to generate enormous power at very low cost. It was said that here, as Murray looked over a topographic map of the Saluda River Valley, his eyes glanced at the 360-foot (110 m) contour line. He followed the line as it meandered through the valley and noticed that the contour did not touch a railroad, and its highest elevation was never less than 40 feet (12 m) below the divide separating the Saluda Valley from the neighboring Broad River Valley. After winding around the valley of the Saluda for nearly 300 miles (480 km), about 10 miles (16 km) west of Columbia its position the north side of the valley approached within 8,000 feet (2.4 km) of its position on the south side. Murray realized that a dam across such an expanse would be ideal for power development. He visited South Carolina to investigate.

While in South Carolina conducting his survey, Murray envisioned a system much larger than Williams's plan for one dam on the Santee River. Murray envisioned a system of three dams, one at the site on the Saluda, which, in addition to power generation, would keep a constant flow of water into the Santee where another dam would bring the water of that river together with the Cooper River on a vast diversion dam that fed the water into a power canal with a third dam and power house. The dimensions of the project quickly overshadowed the 60,000 horsepower (40 MW) system that Williams envisioned and grew to over 400,000 horsepower (300 MW).

==== Securing the land ====
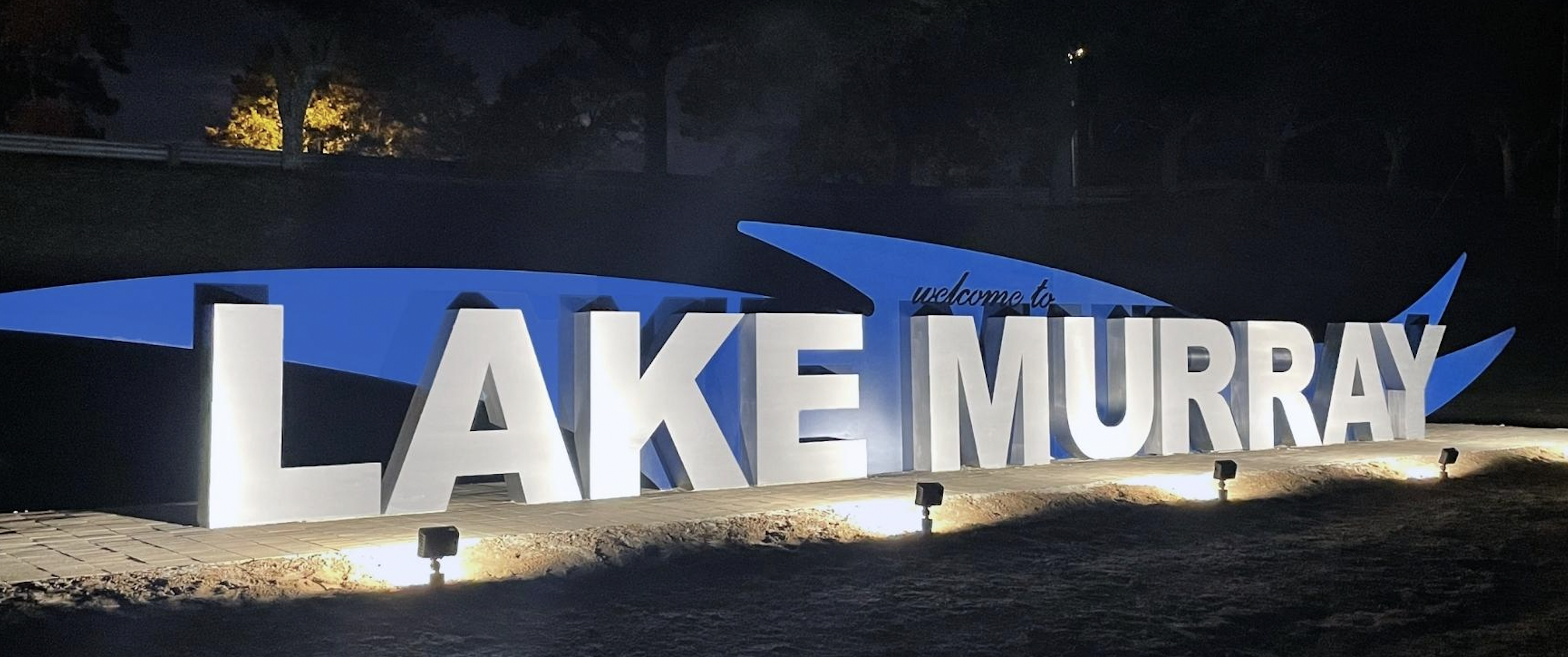
Lake Murray Welcome Sign

On July 8, 1927, the Federal Power Commission granted a license to Lexington Water Power Company for construction of a dam and powerhouse at Dreher Shoals. Immediately, the company went to work on securing the land needed for construction of the lake and dam. The reservoir and its protective margins covered an area of about 65,000 acres (260 km^{2}) and to secure this, it was necessary to purchase a total of approximately 100,000 acres (400 km^{2}) of which approximately 75% was woodland.

To secure the land necessary for the construction, 1,100 parcels of land needed to be purchased, on which approximately 5,000 people lived. The work of acquiring land was made more difficult because many properties had passed from fathers to sons with no legal transfer, with certain lands conveyed under crown grants from King James II of England, and other tracts were heir properties or had no written records.

The work of securing these lands was entrusted to T. C. Williams and he carried it through to a successful conclusion. Not only did he acquire the lands necessary, he made arrangements for the removal of three churches, six schools, and 193 graveyards containing 2,323 graves. In general, the landowners and local officials showed a positive spirit of cooperation with Williams and a large number of landowners took up lands adjacent to, or in the vicinity of the project, and continued farming or other pursuits in the same general neighborhood, so that their removal from the valley was not a loss to the community. Presumably, though, the movement was destructive to some smaller rural micro-communities in the lake bottom.

==== Clearing the way ====
Clearing the basin

Saw mill operating

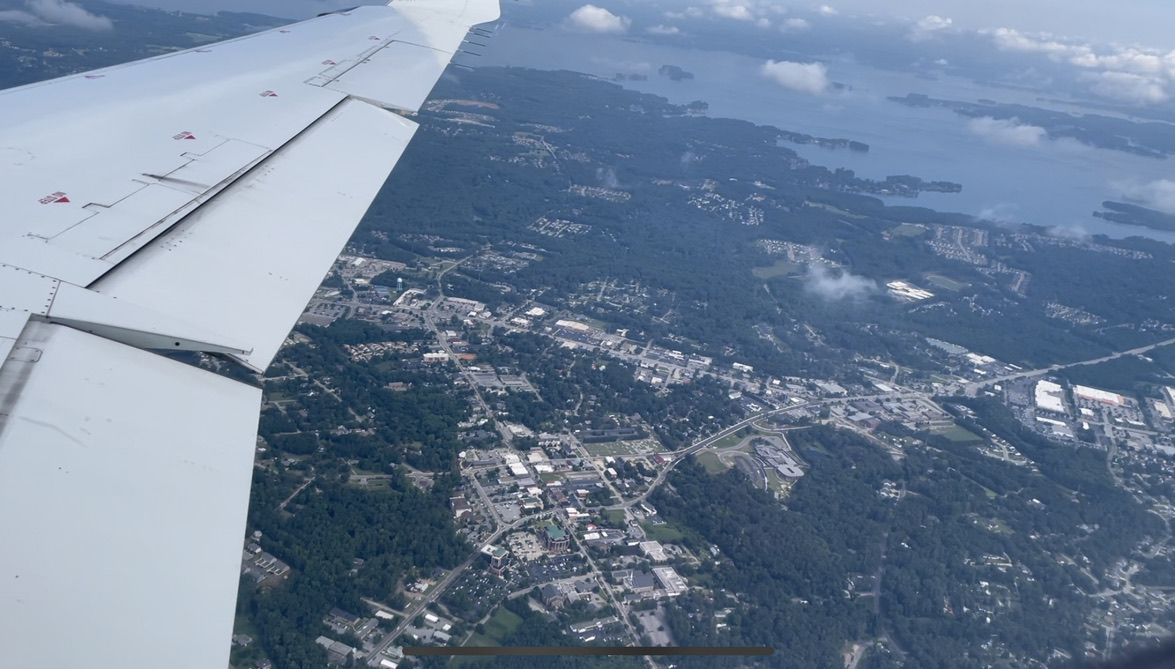
Lexington, SC and Lake Murray from aircraft

The work of clearing the site for the project was started in April 1927. Clearing of the woodland up to the 360-foot (110 m) elevation line, which would later become the high-water mark, was completed in the summer of 1928, when 2,000 men were employed and 37 saw mills were operating. Approximately 100 million board feet (240,000 m^{3}) of lumber was manufactured. Practically all of the lumber required for construction of the dam was supplied from the clearing operation.

With the start of the work on the dam, the necessary field office and camp buildings were built near the site. A village of nine dwellings, a community house, and church were built one-half mile (800 m) away for operators. Dotted throughout the area were the camp sites of the contractors. The Arundel Corporation camps accommodated from 1,500 to 1,800 workmen at different times. The Barstow & Company camps provided quarters for 1,000 to 1,500 men. Smaller camps of subcontractors housed about 500.

One of the first operations was to build a railroad spur three miles (4.8 km) long connecting with the Columbia, Newberry & Laurens Railroad at Irmo. Grading of this transportation link was begun September 12, 1927 and the line was in operation November 25. Prior to the completion of the railroad, construction material and equipment were hauled to the site by truck.

=== 1940s ===
Throughout the 1940s, a number of B-25 Mitchell bombers (flying out of nearby Columbia) crashed into Lake Murray during training exercises for World War II. A few were able to be recovered, but three remained until September 2005, when a B-25C Mitchell bomber that crashed in 1943 was raised from the depths of the lake. Dr. Bob Seigler who spearheaded the project, John Hodge and Dr. Bill Vartorella, formed the Lake Murray B-25 Rescue Project to salvage the aircraft from the bottom of Lake Murray. After recovery the remains of the aircraft were moved to the Southern Museum of Flight in Birmingham, Alabama for conservation and museum display. She was outfitted with a rare, 600 lb. underside machine-gun turret which is believed to be the only one in existence. A video crew, including maritime video experts Nautilus Productions Rick Allen (2nd camera & underwater camera) and Ric Hase (sound), documented the recovery for the Mega Movers series on the History Channel.

== Geography ==
Lake Murray is located on the Saluda River in Central South Carolina, in Lexington, Richland, Newberry, and Saluda counties. It is nearby to the town of Lexington, which itself is a suburb of the capital of South Carolina, Columbia. It has a max width of 14 miles and length of 41 miles. It has an irregular shape, with several coves branching off it. Several small islands are located in the lake, such as the Jim Spence Islands, Shull Island, the islands of Dreher Island State Park, and Bomb Island, also known as Lunch Island, which is one of the largest nesting sites for Purple Martins in the nation.

== Attractions ==
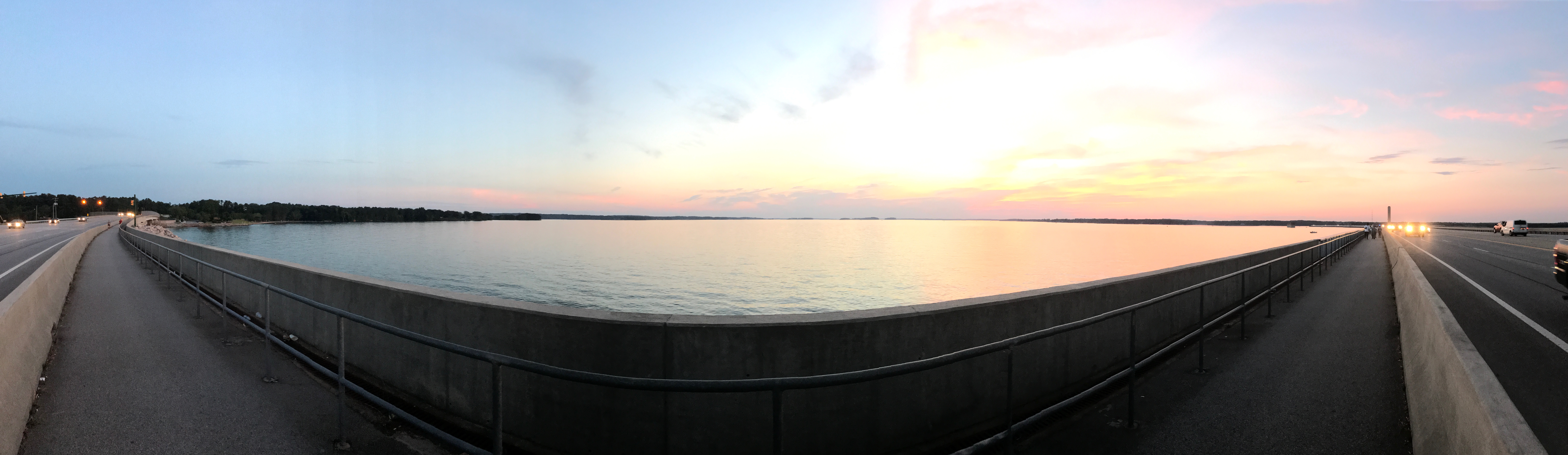
Lake Murray, SC

Boating, fishing, and swimming are popular activities on lake Murray.

=== Fishing ===
Fishing in Lake Murray is one of the most popular activities. Dozens of different species thrive in the lake; some of the more popular fish to catch are largemouth bass, striped bass, blue catfish, channel catfish, black and white Crappie, redear sunfish, and more. Lake Murray has multiple boat landings, such as Murray's Landing, Jake's Landing, and Koon Landing among others.

==== DNR fishing regulations ====
In South Carolina, as in most states, it is required to have a valid fishing license on public property while fishing. South Carolina fishing licenses are most easily purchased through the South Carolina Department of Natural Resources website.

=== Public parks ===
There are several public parks on the lake. Dreher Island State Park is located on three different islands in the northwest corner of the lake. There are several lake related activities there.

North of Lexington, at the dam, there is a walkway going across the dam and recreational areas on each side, the southern one containing a public beach.

=== Events ===
Annually, Spence Island, (on the Lexington side), hosts the Drift Jam rock and country concert in early June, fireworks on the 4th of July, and the Reggaetronic concert in mid-July.

There are many camps related to the lake hosted in the summer.

== See also ==
- List of lakes in South Carolina
- Lake Murray Country
