= William Murray (died 1513) =

Scottish landowner and courtier

William Murray of Castletown and Tullibardine (died 1513) was a Scottish landowner and courtier.

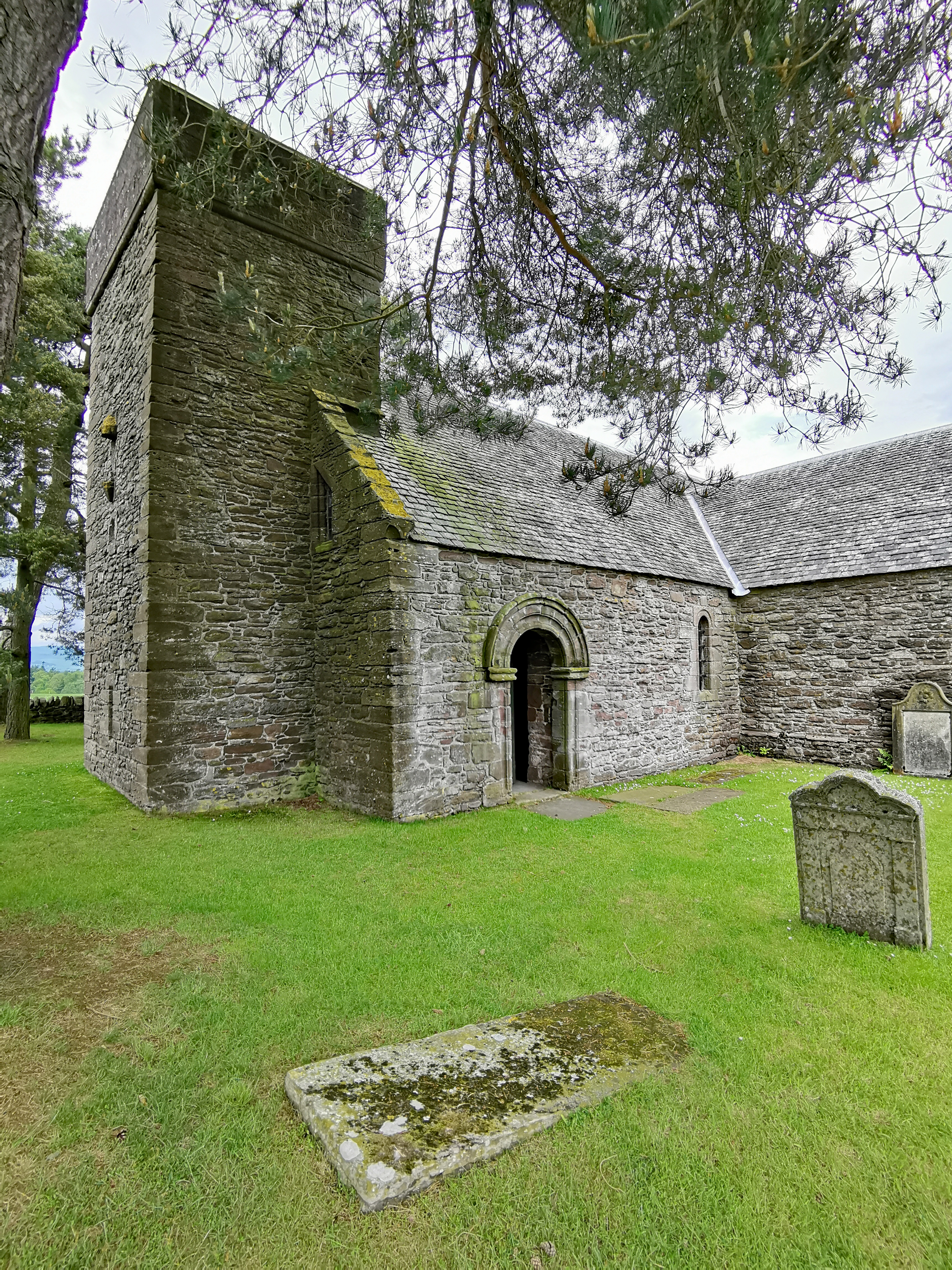
William Murray and his brother extended the family chapel at Tullibardine

He was a son of William Murray (died February 1525), and Mary Kieth, a daughter of William Kieth, 1st Earl Marischal. William Murray was appointed Steward and Forester of Strathearn in August 1473 by James III of Scotland. The grant was renewed on January 1583, or granted to the namesake son of the first Steward.

The family lands were at Tullibardine and Gask. In the first years of the 16th-century, he, his father, and younger brother Andrew Murray, rebuilt Tullibardine Chapel.

In 1507 and 1508, James IV of Scotland held tournaments of the Wild Knight and the Black Lady. For the Arthurian theme, the "Wild Knight" was accompanied by wild men. Murray sent hart horns and goat skins from Tullibardine to Edinburgh for their costumes. By this time, William Murray senior was exempted from royal service due to old age.

In May 1508, during the Black Lady tournament, William Murray, took part in a shooting match with James IV and Duncan Campbell.

William Murray is said to have been killed at the battle of Flodden in 1513.

== Marriage and family ==
William Murray married Margaret Stewart, a daughter of John Stewart, 1st Earl of Atholl. Their children included:

- William Murray of Tullibardine (died 1562), who married Katherine Campbell
- Margaret Murray, who married Thomas Stewart of Grandtully
- Helen Murray, who married Alexander Seton of Parbroath
