= Billy Murray (footballer) =

English footballer

Personal information
- Full name: William Joseph Murray
- Date of birth: 26 January 1922
- Place of birth: Burnley, England
- Date of death: 1992 (aged 69–70)
- Place of death: Stockport, England
- Position: Wing half

Senior career*
Years	Team	Apps	(Gls)
1946–1947	Arbroath	12	(2)
1947–1950	Manchester City	20	(1)
1950–1951	Macclesfield Town	40	(14)
1951–1954	Ashton United		
1954–	Stalybridge Celtic		
Total		72	(17)
- * Club domestic league appearances and goals

Billy Murray was an English footballer, who played as a wing half in the Football League for Manchester City.
