= Saluda Dam =

Dam near Lexington, South Carolina

Lake Murray Dam
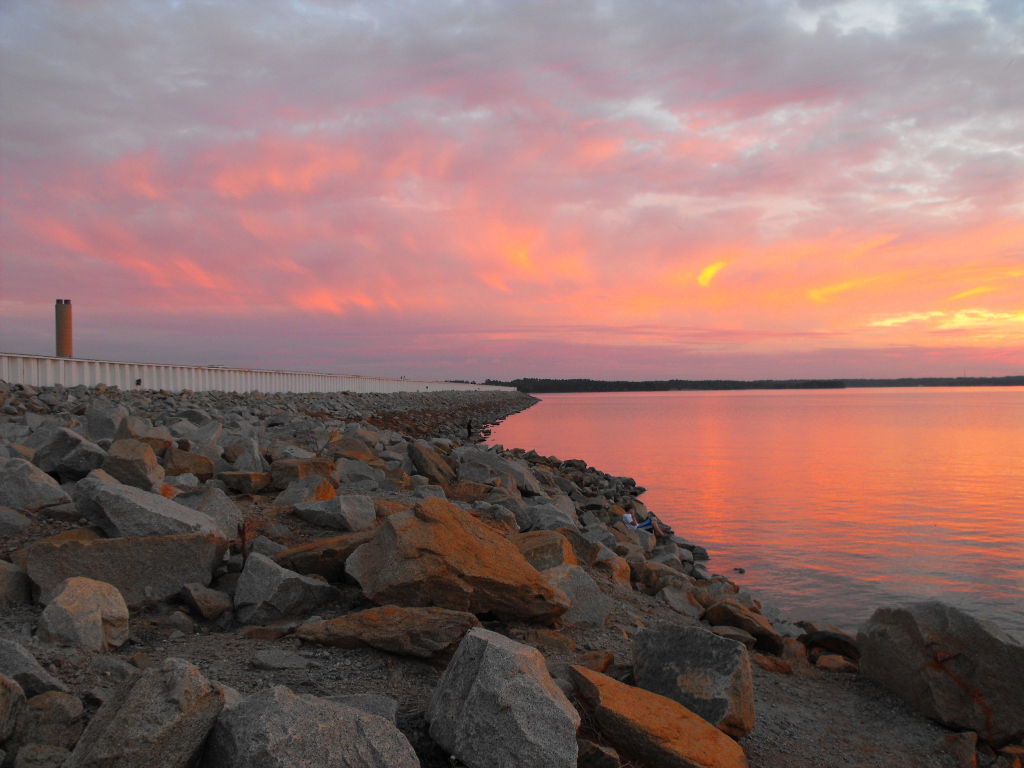
- Looking down the dam from the Irmo side.
- Interactive map of Lake Murray Dam
- Official name: Dreher Shoals Dam
- Location: Lexington County, near Lexington, South Carolina
- Coordinates: 34.0533°N 81.2178°W
- Construction began: 1927
- Opening date: 1930
- Operator: Dominion Energy

Dam and spillways
- Type of dam: Embankment, earth-fill with RCC gravity toe
- Impounds: Saluda River
- Height: 200 ft (61 m)
- Length: 7,800 ft (2,400 m)

Reservoir
- Creates: Lake Murray
- Total capacity: 2,200,000 acre⋅ft (2.7 km^{3})
- Catchment area: 2,420 mi^{2} (6,300 km^{2})
- Surface area: 50,000 acres (200 km^{2})

Power Station
- Turbines: 5 x vertical Francis turbines (3 @ 32.5 MW, 1 @ 42.3 MW, 1 @ 67.5 MW)
- Installed capacity: 207 MW
- Annual generation: 245,000,000 kWh

The Saluda Dam or Saluda River Dam, officially the Dreher Shoals Dam, commonly referred to as the Lake Murray Dam, is an earthen embankment dam located approximately 10 miles (15 km) west of Columbia, South Carolina on the Saluda River. Construction on the dam began in 1927 and was completed in 1930. The purpose of the dam is flood control, hydroelectricity, recreation and water supply. At the time of its completion, the Saluda Dam was the world's largest earthen dam, creating the world's largest man-made lake, Lake Murray. In 2005, construction on a 213 ft (65 m). tall roller-compacted concrete (RCC) dam was completed at the toe of the original dam in order to mitigate an earthquake-caused dam failure.

South Carolina Highway 6 crosses over the dam and is used as a fast connection between the towns of Lexington and Irmo. The yearly football game between rival Lexington High School and Irmo High School is often called "The Battle of the Dam".

== Characteristics ==
The original Saluda Dam is a 7,800 ft (2,400 m) long, 213-foot (65 m)-high earthen-embankment dam. The dam contains a 2,900 ft (880 m) long emergency spillway controlled by six steel tainter gates. The back-up dam located at the original dam's toe and is a 2,300 ft (700 m) long, 213-foot (65 m) high roller-compacted concrete dam. Rock-fill embankment sections also exist on the south and north ends of the back up dam, making a total length of 5,700 ft (1,700 m).

The hydroelectricity power station consists of concrete five vertical Francis turbines; three at 32.5 MW, one at 42.3 MW and another at 67.5 MW. The power station receives water by means of five 223 ft (68 m). high intake towers and then into penstocks. Water released from the power station moves down a 150 ft (46 m) long tailrace tunnel before being discharged back in the Saluda River.

On the dam, South Carolina Highway 6 splits into two lanes, the northward one going in between the main and backup dams, and the southward road staying on the main dam. There is also a walkway across the dam.

== History ==
=== Saluda Dam Remediation Project ===
Construction of a backup dam immediately next to the Saluda Dam was completed in 2005 by the SCANA corporation. The construction was first proposed in 1989 but did not begin until 2002. The roller-compacted concrete backup dam was required by the federal government as a mechanism for preventing flooding if an earthquake of similar magnitude to the 1886 Charleston earthquake was to occur again in South Carolina. It was projected that large parts of the Columbia, SC metropolitan region (encompassing around 135,000 people) would have been in the flood region if the original dam was damaged.

During construction, workers laid 18,590 cubic yards (14,210 m^{3}) of roller-compacted concrete in one day, setting a North American record. The total fill for the back up dam is 1,300,000 cubic yards (990,000 m^{3}). Because of this and the worker's "...proactive approach to protecting the surrounding communities, and the innovative methods they implemented to achieve that goal...", it received the 2006 American Society of Civil Engineers Outstanding Civil Engineering Achievement Award.

== See also ==
- Lake Murray
- List of lakes in South Carolina
