= Abercairny =

Coordinates: 56.381300°N 3.765148°W

Abercairny: Scottish Gaelic: Obar Càrnaich
- Location within Perth and Kinross
- OS grid reference: NN911224
- Council area: Perth and Kinross
- Lieutenancy area: Perth and Kinross
- Country: Scotland
- Sovereign state: United Kingdom
- Post town: CRIEFF
- Postcode district: PH7
- Dialling code: 01764
- Police: Scotland
- Fire: Scottish
- Ambulance: Scottish
- UK Parliament: Perth and Kinross-shire
- Scottish Parliament: Perth Mid Scotland and Fife

Designations

Inventory of Gardens and Designed Landscapes in Scotland
- Official name: Abercairny
- Designated: 1 July 1987
- Reference no.: GDL00002

Abercairny is an estate in the Scottish region of Perth and Kinross. It had the distinction of a short visit by Queen Victoria on 12 September 1842, when she wished to see the mansion house, then under construction. The estate, owned by the Murray (or Morays) family since the 13th century, is 4 miles (6 kilometres) east of Crieff. It is included in the Inventory of Gardens and Designed Landscapes in Scotland.

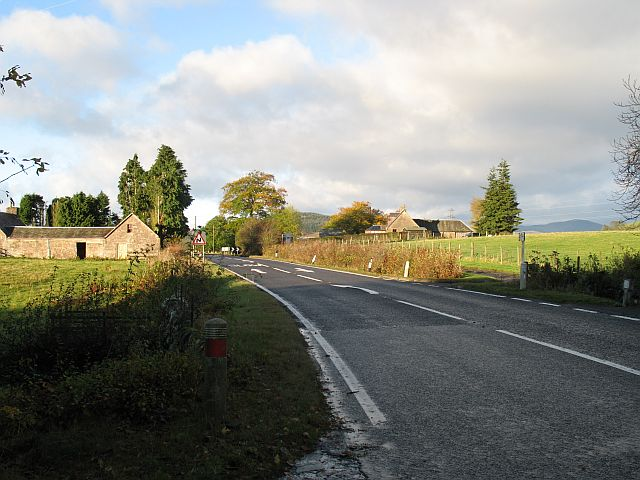
Milton of Abercairny at A85 road
