= 1982–83 Rangers F.C. season =

Rangers
1982-83 season
- Chairman: Rae Simpson
- Manager: John Greig
- Ground: Ibrox Park
- Scottish Premier Division: 4th P36 W13 D12 L11 F52 A41 Pts38
- Scottish Cup: Runners-up
- League Cup: Runners-up
- UEFA Cup: Second round
- Top goalscorer: League: John MacDonald (10); All: John MacDonald (20)

The 1982–83 season was the 103rd season of competitive football by Rangers.

== Overview ==
Rangers played a total of 57 competitive matches during the 1982–83 season. Greig made big-money signings in the pre-season 1982–83 with renewed hope that they could at least mount a serious title challenge, but once again, the season ended in trophyless failure. Dave MacKinnon - £30,000 from Partick Thistle, Craig Paterson - £200,000 from Hibernian, Robert Prytz from Malmö FF and Sandy Clark from West Ham United, were all welcomed to the club.

The early signs were positive. Rangers reached the 1982 Scottish League Cup Final scoring en route 29 goals in there ten games and eliminated Borussia Dortmund from the UEFA Cup. The opening eight league games saw the side unbeaten but the final match saw Rangers lying in fourth, a massive eighteen points behind champions Dundee United. The team was knocked out of Europe after suffering a 5–0 defeat from Cologne. The 1983 Scottish Cup Final was lost to an Aberdeen side that had won the European Cup Winner's Cup ten days earlier, their double allowing Rangers to take Scotland's Cup Winners' Cup berth for the following season.

== Results ==
All results are written with Rangers' score first.

=== Scottish Premier Division ===
Date	Opponent	Venue	Result	Attendance	Scorers
4 September 1982	Motherwell	A	2–2	19,159	Prytz (pen), Redford
11 September 1982	Dundee United	H	0–0	22,000	
18 September 1982	Kilmarnock	H	5–0	17,350	MacDonald (2), Russell, Johnstone, McClelland
25 September 1982	Aberdeen	A	2–1	20,300	Johnstone, Prytz
2 October 1982	Dundee	H	1–1	18,100	Johnstone
9 October 1982	Greenock Morton	A	0–0	11,500	
16 October 1982	St. Mirren	A	2–2	12,121	Bett, MacKinnon
23 October 1982	Hibernian	H	3–2	16,250	Johnstone (2), McNamara (og)
30 October 1982	Celtic	A	2–3	60,408	Prytz, Cooper
6 November 1982	Motherwell	H	4–0	17,000	MacDonald (2), Dalziel (2)
13 November 1982	Dundee United	A	2–4	16,470	Cooper, Johnstone
20 November 1982	Kilmarnock	A	0–0	9,194	
27 November 1982	Aberdeen	H	0–1	27,000	
11 December 1982	Greenock Morton	H	1–1	9,500	Prytz (pen)
18 December 1982	St. Mirren	H	1–0	10,500	MacDonald
27 December 1982	Hibernian	A	0–0	15,900	
1 January 1983	Celtic	H	1–2	45,000	Black
3 January 1983	Motherwell	A	0–3	11,383	
8 January 1983	Dundee United	H	2–1	15,500	Prytz, Kennedy
15 January 1983	Kilmarnock	H	1–1	11,223	MacDonald
22 January 1983	Aberdeen	A	0–2	21,600	
5 February 1983	Dundee	H	1–1	8,500	McPherson
12 February 1983	Greenock Morton	A	5–0	6,900	Bett (2), Kennedy (2), MacDonald
26 February 1983	St. Mirren	A	0–1	11,484	
2 March 1983	Dundee	A	0–1	6,624	
5 March 1983	Hibernian	H	1–1	10,975	Dalziel
19 March 1983	Motherwell	H	1–0	18,000	McClelland
23 March 1983	Celtic	A	0–0	51,062	
26 March 1983	Kilmarnock	A	1–0	6,648	MacDonald
2 April 1983	Dundee United	A	1–3	14,142	Clark
9 April 1983	Aberdeen	H	2–1	19,800	Redford, Bett
23 April 1983	Greenock Morton	H	2–0	9,500	MacDonald, Redford
30 April 1983	St. Mirren	H	4–0	9,321	Bett (2), MacDonald, Clark
4 May 1983	Dundee	A	1–2	4,788	Clark
7 May 1983	Hibernian	A	2–1	10,500	Cooper (2)
14 May 1983	Celtic	H	2–4	40,500	Clark (2)

=== UEFA Cup ===
Date	Round	Opponent	Venue	Result	Attendance	Scorers
15 September 1982	R1	Borussia Dortmund	A	0–0	54,000	
29 September 1982	R1	Borussia Dortmund	H	2–0	44,500	Cooper, Johnstone
20 October 1982	R2	F.C. Köln	H	2–1	30,420	Johnstone, McClelland
3 November 1982	R2	F.C. Köln	A	0–5	61,000	

=== Scottish Cup ===
Date	Round	Opponent	Venue	Result	Attendance	Scorers
29 January 1983	R3	Falkirk	A	2–0	14,700	Kennedy, Oliver (og)
19 February 1983	R4	Forfar Athletic	H	2–1	14,500	MacDonald (2)
12 March 1983	QF	Queen's Park	A	2–1	13,716	Dalziel, Cooper
16 April 1983	SF	St Mirren	N	1–1	31,102	Clark
19 April 1983	SF R	St Mirren	N	1–0	25,725	Clark
21 May 1983	F	Aberdeen	N	0–1	62,979	

=== League Cup ===
Date	Round	Opponent	Venue	Result	Attendance	Scorers
14 August 1982	SR	Hibernian	A	1–1	15,980	MacDonald
18 August 1982	SR	Airdrieonians	H	3–1	9,500	Bett, Paterson, Black
21 August 1982	SR	Clydebank	A	4–1	7,090	MacDonald (2), Prytz, McClelland
25 August 1982	SR	Airdrieonians	A	2–1	6,476	Dalziel, Paterson
28 August 1982	SR	Hibernian	H	0–0	17,600	
1 September 1982	SR	Clydebank	H	3–2	6,300	MacDonald, Prytz (pen), Redford
22 September 1982	QF	Kilmarnock	A	6–1	7,903	Cooper (4), J.MacDonald (2)
6 October 1982	QF	Kilmarnock	H	6–0	5,342	MacDonald (2), Johnstone (2), McPherson, Bett (pen)
27 October 1982	SF	Heart of Midlothian	H	2–0	25,500	D.Cooper, Bett
10 November 1982	SF	Heart of Midlothian	A	2–1	18,983	Bett (pen), Johnstone
4 December 1982	F	Celtic	N	1–2	55,372	Bett

== Appearances ==
Player	Position	Appearances	Goals
(Scotland) Jim Stewart	GK	33	0
(Scotland) Andy Bruce	GK	1	0
(Scotland) Peter McCloy	GK	23	0
(Scotland) Dave MacKinnon	DF	50	1
(Scotland) Ally Dawson	DF	40	0
(Northern Ireland) John McClelland	DF	56	4
(Scotland) Craig Paterson	DF	36	2
(Scotland) Jim Bett	MF	56	11
(Scotland) Davie Cooper	MF	49	11
(Sweden) Robert Prytz	MF	48	7
(Scotland) Colin McAdam	DF	12	0
(Scotland) Ian Redford	MF	54	4
(Scotland) John MacDonald	FW	47	20
(Scotland) Derek Johnstone	FW	26	11
(Scotland) Bobby Russell	MF	33	1
(Scotland) Billy MacKay	MF	7	0
(Scotland) Kenny Black	MF	23	2
(Scotland) Dave McPherson	DF	27	2
(Scotland) Gregor Stevens	DF	15	0
(Scotland) Doug Robertson	FW	5	0
(Scotland) Gordon Dalziel	MF	22	5
(Scotland) Andy Kennedy	FW	18	4
(Scotland) Gordon Smith	FW	3	0
(Scotland) Billy Davies	MF	8	0
(Scotland) Kenny Lyall	MF	6	0
(Scotland) Sandy Clark	FW	13	7
(Scotland) Alex Miller	DF	2	0

== League table ==
Pos	Team	Pld	W	D	L	GF	GA	GD	Pts	Qualification or relegation
2	Celtic	36	25	5	6	90	36	+54	55	Qualification for the UEFA Cup first round
3	Aberdeen	36	25	5	6	76	25	+51	55	Qualification for the Cup Winners' Cup first round
4	Rangers	36	13	12	11	53	41	+12	38	Qualification for the Cup Winners' Cup first round
5	St Mirren	36	11	12	13	47	51	−4	34	Qualification for the UEFA Cup first round
6	Dundee	36	9	11	16	42	53	−11	29	

Source: Statto
Rules for classification: 1) points; 2) goal difference; 3) number of goals scored.

== See also ==
- 1982–83 in Scottish football
- 1982–83 Scottish Cup
- 1982–83 Scottish League Cup
- 1982–83 UEFA Cup
