= 1984–85 Rangers F.C. season =

Rangers
1984-85 season
- Chairman: John Paton
- Manager: Jock Wallace
- Ground: Ibrox
- Scottish Premier Division: 4th
- Scottish Cup: Fourth round
- League Cup: Winners
- UEFA Cup: Second round
- Glasgow Cup: Winners
- Top goalscorer: League: Ally McCoist (12); All: Ally McCoist (18)

The 1984–85 season was the 105th season of competitive football by Rangers.

== Overview ==
Rangers played a total of 49 competitive matches during the 1984–85 season.

The season was Wallace's first full season in charge since his return. The team continued the strong form they had ended the previous season in, and by Christmas were in third place, in touching distance of the top of the table. However, a defeat to rivals Celtic on New Year's Day saw the club's form completely implode, and they only won four more league games all season. Rangers again finished fourth in the league by a massive twenty-one point record behind champions Aberdeen. This disappointment was not caused due to a lack of investment in the playing squad. A total of £495,000 was spent bringing in Iain Ferguson and Cammy Fraser from Dundee, Ted McMinn from Queen of the South and bringing back Derek Johnstone from Chelsea.

The club won the Scottish League Cup (Skol Cup) for a second season in a row defeating Dundee United in the final. A solitary Iain Ferguson strike gave Rangers a 1–0 win.

== Results ==
All results are written with Rangers' score first.

=== Scottish Premier Division ===
Date	Opponent	Venue	Result	Attendance	Scorers
11 August 1984	St Mirren	H	0–0	22,398	
18 August 1984	Dumbarton	A	2–1	9,607	McCoist, Redford
25 August 1984	Celtic	H	0–0	43,500	
1 September 1984	Dundee	A	2–0	14,156	I.Ferguson, Redford
8 September 1984	Hibernian	H	2–0	22,601	Paterson, MacDonald
15 September 1984	Aberdeen	A	0–0	23,500	
22 September 1984	Greenock Morton	H	2–0	16,995	McCoist, Fraser
29 September 1984	Dundee United	H	1–0	29,232	Paterson
6 October 1984	Heart of Midlothian	A	0–1	18,097	
13 October 1984	St Mirren	A	2–0	14,389	Redford, I.Ferguson
20 October 1984	Dumbarton	H	0–0	16,521	
3 November 1984	Dundee	H	0–0	14,588	
10 November 1984	Hibernian	A	2–2	14,000	Fraser, Cooper
17 November 1984	Aberdeen	H	1–2	44,000	Mitchell
24 November 1984	Greenock Morton	A	3–1	11,000	Redford (2), Dawson
1 December 1984	Dundee United	A	1–1	16,477	Mitchell
8 December 1984	Heart of Midlothian	H	1–1	16,700	Mitchell
15 December 1984	St Mirren	H	2–0	12,763	Fraser, MacDonald
22 December 1984	Celtic	A	1–1	43,748	Cooper
29 December 1984	Dumbarton	A	4–2	7,800	I.Ferguson, McMinn, Mitchell, Cooper
1 January 1985	Celtic	H	1–2	45,000	Cooper
5 January 1985	Dundee	A	2–2	11,991	I.Ferguson (2)
12 January 1985	Hibernian	H	1–2	18,500	I.Ferguson
19 January 1985	Aberdeen	A	1–5	23,000	Prytz
2 February 1985	Greenock Morton	H	2–0	14,121	MacDonald, Johnstone
9 February 1985	Dundee United	H	0–0	19,370	
23 February 1985	Heart of Midlothian	A	0–2	14,004	
2 March 1985	Dumbarton	H	3–1	8,424	McCoist (2), E.Ferguson
16 March 1985	St Mirren	A	1–2	8,608	McCoist
23 March 1985	Dundee	H	1–3	9,954	McCoist
6 April 1985	Aberdeen	H	1–2	23,437	Prytz
20 April 1985	Greenock Morton	A	3–0	7,000	McCoist (3)
27 April 1985	Heart of Midlothian	H	3–1	12,913	McCoist, Prytz (pen.), Cooper
1 May 1985	Celtic	A	1–1	40,079	McCoist (pen.)
4 May 1985	Dundee United	A	1–2	10,251	McCoist
11 May 1985	Hibernian	A	0–1	7,149	

=== UEFA Cup ===
Date	Round	Opponent	Venue	Result	Attendance	Scorers
18 September 1984	R1	Bohemian	A	2–3	10,000	McCoist, McPherson
3 October 1984	R1	Bohemian	H	2–0	31,000	Paterson, Redford
24 October 1984	R2	Inter Milan	A	0–3	65,591	
7 November 1984	R2	Inter Milan	H	3–1	30,594	I.Ferguson (2), Mitchell

=== Scottish Cup ===
Date	Round	Opponent	Venue	Result	Attendance	Scorers
26 January 1985	R3	Morton	A	3–3	12,012	Prytz, MacDonald, McPherson
30 January 1985	R3 R	Morton	H	3–1	18,166	Mitchell, Fraser, MacDonald
16 February 1985	R4	Dundee	H	0–1	26,619	

=== League Cup ===
Date	Round	Opponent	Venue	Result	Attendance	Scorers
22 August 1984	R2	Falkirk	H	1–0	10,429	McPherson
29 August 1984	R3	Raith Rovers	H	4–0	10,132	McCoist (2, 1 (pen.)), Paterson, Redford
5 September 1984	QF	Cowdenbeath	A	3–1	9,925	I.Ferguson, Russell, Redford
26 September 1984	SF L1	Meadowbank Thistle	H	4–0	12,600	McCoist (2), I.Ferguson, Fraser
9 October 1984	SF L2	Meadowbank Thistle	A	1–1	5,100	McCoist
28 October 1984	F	Dundee United	N	1–0	44,698	I.Ferguson

=== Glasgow Cup ===
Date	Round	Opponent	Venue	Result	Attendance	Scorers
13 May 1985	SF	Partick Thistle	A	2–1	3,264	McPherson, McCoist
9 September 1985	F	Queen's Park	N	5–0	3,584	Fraser (3), Ferguson, McCoist (pen)

== Appearances ==
Player	Position	Appearances	Goals
(Scotland) Nicky Walker	GK	20	0
(Scotland) Hugh Burns	DF	16	0
(Scotland) Ally Dawson	DF	35	1
(Scotland) Dave MacKinnon	DF	41	0
(Northern Ireland) John McClelland	DF	20	0
(Scotland) Ian Redford	MF	37	8
(Scotland) John MacDonald	FW	23	5
(Scotland) Cammy Fraser	MF	41	5
(Scotland) Iain Ferguson	MF	39	11
(Scotland) Ally McCoist	FW	38	18
(Scotland) Davie Cooper	MF	44	5
(Scotland) Scott Fraser	DF	2	0
(Scotland) Eric Ferguson	FW	9	1
(Scotland) Craig Paterson	DF	33	4
(Scotland) Bobby Russell	MF	26	1
(Scotland) Sandy Clark	FW	4	0
(Scotland) Dave McPherson	DF	44	3
(Australia) Dave Mitchell	MF	21	6
(Scotland) Peter McCloy	GK	27	0
(Sweden) Robert Prytz	MF	28	4
(Scotland) Ted McMinn	MF	20	1
(Scotland) Robert Fleck	MF	11	0
(Scotland) Stuart Munro	DF	18	0
(Scotland) Derek Ferguson	MF	8	0
(Scotland) Derek Johnstone	FW	12	1
(Scotland) Bobby Williamson	FW	1	0
(Scotland) Dave MacFarlane	MF	3	0
(Scotland) Andy Bruce	GK	1	0
(Scotland) Ian Durrant	MF	5	0

== League table ==
Pos	Team	Pld	W	D	L	GF	GA	GD	Pts	Qualification or relegation
2	Celtic	36	22	8	6	77	30	+47	52	Qualification for the Cup Winners' Cup first round
3	Dundee United	36	20	7	9	67	33	+34	47	Qualification for the UEFA Cup first round
4	Rangers	36	13	12	11	47	38	+9	38	Qualification for the UEFA Cup first round
5	St Mirren	36	17	4	15	51	56	−5	38	Qualification for the UEFA Cup first round
6	Dundee	36	15	7	14	48	50	−2	37	

Source: Statto
Rules for classification: 1) points; 2) goal difference; 3) number of goals scored.

== See also ==
- 1984–85 in Scottish football
- 1984–85 Scottish Cup
- 1984–85 Scottish League Cup
- 1984–85 UEFA Cup
