= 1983–84 Rangers F.C. season =

Rangers
1983-84 season
- Chairman: Rae Simpson; John Paton
- Manager: John Greig (until 28 October); Tommy McLean; Jock Wallace (from 10 November)
- Ground: Ibrox Park
- Scottish Premier Division: 4th
- Scottish Cup: Quarter-finals
- League Cup: Winners
- Cup Winners' Cup: Second round
- Glasgow Cup: Winners
- Top goalscorer: League: Sandy Clark (9); All: Ally McCoist (20)

The 1983–84 season was the 104th season of competitive football by Rangers.

== Overview ==
Rangers played a total of 55 competitive matches during the 1983–84 season. The season would signal the end of John Greig's managerial career. The league season began badly, one point from the first four league games, although the team did win their six League Cup games under Greig. A fruitful brief run in the European Cup Winner's Cup saw Rangers win the second round, first leg 2–1 over F.C. Porto (runners up) after the team's record breaking 18-0 aggregate win over Maltese champions Valletta. After the first nine league games, Greig's team had collected just seven points from eighteen and, in the end, the pressure was too much for Greig who ultimately resigned as manager on 28 October 1983.

Rangers were overseen by former midfielder Tommy McLean, who acted as caretaker, whilst attempts were made to find a new permanent manager. On 10 November 1983, Jock Wallace was persuaded by the Rangers board to leave Motherwell and return to the club. His aim was to restore the glory years of the treble-winning sides of the late 1970s. Wallace's initial impact was positive, boosting morale and fitness. He made changes to the coaching staff, bringing in Alex Totten as first team coach with Tommy McLean, David Provan and Joe Mason leaving. Wallace also added to the squad during the season; Bobby Williamson arrived from Clydebank, Nicky Walker from old club Motherwell and Stuart Munro from Alloa Athletic.

Wallace's first match in command was at Pittodrie on 12 November 1983. The game finished in a 3–0 defeat but subsequently the side went on a 22 match unbeaten run in all competitions until March 1984. However, Rangers still ended that season fourth in the league, fifteen points behind champions Aberdeen. The club did win a trophy, the League Cup. The cup final was a thrilling extra-time victory over Celtic, with Ally McCoist getting a hat-trick, in the 3–2 win that won them the cup.

== Results ==
All results are written with Rangers' score first.

=== Scottish Premier Division ===
Date	Opponent	Venue	Result	Attendance	Scorers
20 August 1983	St Mirren	H	1–1	21,500	Prytz (pen.)
3 September 1983	Celtic	A	1–2	50,662	McCoist
10 September 1983	Heart of Midlothian	A	1–3	16,173	Mitchell
17 September 1983	Aberdeen	H	0–2	27,500	
24 September 1983	St Johnstone	H	6–3	12,500	McCoist (2), McClelland, Prytz (pen.), Cooper, Clark
1 October 1983	Dundee United	A	2–0	16,738	Clark, Hegarty (o.g.)
8 October 1983	Hibernian	H	1–0	21,800	McClelland
15 October 1983	Dundee	A	2–3	11,945	Russell, Redford
22 October 1983	Motherwell	H	1–2	15,000	McCoist (pen.)
29 October 1983	St Mirren	A	0–3	12,068	
5 November 1983	Celtic	H	1–2	42,000	Clark
12 November 1983	Aberdeen	A	0–3	22,771	
19 November 1983	Dundee United	H	0–0	27,800	
26 November 1983	St Johnstone	A	1–0	9,740	Redford
3 December 1983	Heart of Midlothian	H	3–0	22,500	Clark (2), MacDonald
10 December 1983	Motherwell	A	3–0	13,586	McAdam, Cooper, Mitchell
17 December 1983	Dundee	H	2–1	16,500	Russell, Williamson
27 December 1983	Hibernian	A	2–0	20,820	Williamson, Cooper
31 December 1983	St Mirren	H	1–1	21,200	Clark
7 January 1984	Aberdeen	H	1–1	37,500	Cooper (pen.)
21 January 1984	St Johnstone	H	2–0	18,001	Clark, Russell
4 February 1984	Motherwell	H	2–1	17,000	McCoist, Prytz (pen.)
11 February 1984	Heart of Midlothian	A	2–2	18,063	McCoist, Williamson
25 February 1984	Dundee	A	3–1	11,750	Russell, Cooper, McPherson
3 March 1984	Hibernian	H	0–0	17,000	
6 March 1984	St Johnstone	A	4–1	5,293	Redford, Clark, Davies, McCoist
31 March 1984	Motherwell	A	3–0	8,574	Paterson, McPherson, Burns
2 April 1984	Celtic	A	0–3	53,229	
7 April 1984	Heart of Midlothian	H	0–0	22,000	
21 April 1984	Celtic	H	1–0	40,260	Williamson
28 April 1984	St Mirren	A	1–1	8,092	Williamson
2 May 1984	Dundee United	H	2–2	16,500	Clark, Williamson
5 May 1984	Dundee	H	2–2	17,000	Redford, Cooper
9 May 1984	Aberdeen	A	0–0	16,200	
12 May 1984	Hibernian	A	0–0	10,567	
14 May 1984	Dundee United	A	2–1	6,457	Prytz (pen.), McCoist

=== Cup Winners' Cup ===
Date	Round	Opponent	Venue	Result	Attendance	Scorers
14 September 1983	R1	Valletta	A	8–0	18,213	McPherson (4), Prytz (2, 1 (pen.)), Paterson, MacDonald
28 September 1983	R1	Valletta	H	10–0	11,500	MacDonald (3, 1 (pen.)), Mitchell (2), Redford (2), Dawson, MacKay, Davies
19 October 1983	R2	FC Porto	H	2–1	27,800	Clark, Mitchell
2 November 1983	R2	FC Porto	A	0–1	63,000	

=== Scottish Cup ===
Date	Round	Opponent	Venue	Result	Attendance	Scorers
28 January 1984	R3	Dunfermline Athletic	H	2–1	17,500	McAdam, McCoist
18 February 1984	R4	Caledonian	A	6–0	5,500	Williamson (2), McCoist (2), Redford, Russell
10 March 1984	QF	Dundee	A	2–2	17,097	Russell, McGeachie (o.g.)
17 March 1984	QF R	Dundee	H	2–3	25,000	McPherson, McClelland

=== League Cup ===
Date	Round	Opponent	Venue	Result	Attendance	Scorers
24 August 1983	R2 L1	Queen of the South	H	4–0	8,000	MacDonald (2), Clark, Prytz (pen.)
27 August 1983	R2 L2	Queen of the South	A	4–1	7,350	Mitchell, McKinnon, Cooper, McCoist
31 August 1983	SR	Clydebank	H	4–0	8,500	McCoist (2), Russell, Prytz
7 September 1983	SR	Heart of Midlothian	A	3–0	11,287	Clark (2), Gauld (o.g.)
5 October 1983	SR	St Mirren	H	5–0	11,500	McCoist (2), Clark, McClelland, Paterson
26 October 1983	SR	Heart of Midlothian	H	2–0	12,000	Prytz, Mitchell
9 November 1983	SR	Clydebank	A	3–0	3,612	Cooper, McCoist, McPherson
30 November 1983	SR	St Mirren	A	1–0	5,446	Cooper
15 February 1984	SF L1	Dundee United	A	1–1	14,569	Mitchell
22 February 1984	SF L2	Dundee United	H	2–0	35,950	Clark, Redford
25 March 1984	F	Celtic	N	3–2	66,369	McCoist (3, 1 (pen.))

=== Glasgow Cup (1982-83 competition) ===
Date	Round	Opponent	Venue	Result	Attendance	Scorers
10 August 1983	SF	Clyde	A	1–0	4,700	Ruseell
13 August 1983	F	Celtic	N	1–0	32,707	Clark

== Appearances ==
Player	Position	Appearances	Goals
(Scotland) Peter McCloy	GK	40	0
(Scotland) Nicky Walker	GK	11	0
(Scotland) Ally Dawson	DF	45	1
(Northern Ireland) John McClelland	DF	55	4
(Scotland) Dave McPherson	DF	54	8
(Scotland) Craig Paterson	DF	34	3
(Scotland) Ian Redford	MF	47	8
(Sweden) Robert Prytz	MF	42	9
(Scotland) Ally McCoist	FW	47	20
(Scotland) Sandy Clark	FW	45	16
(Scotland) Bobby Russell	MF	48	7
(Scotland) Davie Cooper	MF	51	9
(Scotland) John MacDonald	FW	28	7
(Scotland) Billy Davies	MF	7	2
(Scotland) Dave MacKinnon	DF	23	1
(Australia) David Mitchell	MF	21	8
(Scotland) Jim Stewart	GK	4	0
(Northern Ireland) Jimmy Nicholl	DF	26	0
(Scotland) Kenny Lyall	MF	2	0
(Scotland) Gregor Stevens	DF	2	0
(Scotland) Derek Ferguson	MF	5	0
(Scotland) Andy Kennedy	FW	2	0
(Scotland) Colin McAdam	DF	11	2
(Scotland) Bobby Williamson	FW	20	8
(Scotland) Hugh Burns	DF	7	1
(Scotland) Scott Fraser	DF	8	0
(Scotland) Billy MacKay	MF	5	1
(Scotland) Stuart Munro	DF	5	0
(Scotland) Robert Fleck	MF	1	0
(Scotland) Eric Ferguson	FW	4	0
(Scotland) Kenny Black	MF	1	0

== League table ==
Pos	Team	Pld	W	D	L	GF	GA	GD	Pts	Qualification or relegation
2	Celtic	36	21	8	7	80	41	+39	50	Qualification for the Cup Winners' Cup first round
3	Dundee United	36	18	11	7	67	39	+28	47	Qualification for the UEFA Cup first round
4	Rangers	36	15	12	9	53	41	+12	42	Qualification for the UEFA Cup first round
5	Heart of Midlothian	36	10	16	10	38	47	−9	36	Qualification for the UEFA Cup first round
6	St Mirren	36	9	14	13	55	59	−4	32	

Source: Statto
Rules for classification: 1) points; 2) goal difference; 3) number of goals scored.

== See also ==
- 1983–84 in Scottish football
- 1983–84 Scottish Cup
- 1983–84 Scottish League Cup
- 1983–84 European Cup Winners' Cup
