= 1985–86 Rangers F.C. season =

Rangers
1985–86 season
- Chairman: John Paton
- Manager: Jock Wallace (until 7 April); Alex Totten (from 8 April) (until 16 April); Walter Smith (from 16 April) (until 1 May); Graeme Souness (from 1 May)
- Ground: Ibrox Park
- Scottish Premier Division: 5th
- Scottish Cup: Third round
- League Cup: Semi-finals
- UEFA Cup: First round
- Glasgow Cup: Winners
- Top goalscorer: League: Ally McCoist (25); All: Ally McCoist (27)

The 1985–86 season was the 106th season of competitive football by Rangers.

== Overview ==
Rangers played a total of 44 competitive matches during the 1985–86 season. The team finished a disappointing 5th in the Scottish Premier Division. A total of 35 points were gained from 36 games with only 13 wins and 14 defeats. This resulted in the departure of Jock Wallace as manager in 7 April with the club announcing that Scotland captain Graeme Souness would take over as player-manager after the World Cup Finals in Mexico.

In the cup competitions, they were knocked out of the Scottish Cup in the third round, losing 3–2 at Tynecastle to Hearts. They were knocked out of the League Cup by Edinburgh's other team Hibernian 2–1 on aggregate in the two legged semi final.

The European campaign lasted two matches. The club went out in the first round of the UEFA Cup after losing to Spanish side CA Osasuna. The first leg at Ibrox was won 1–0 thanks to a Craig Paterson goal but the team went down 2–0 in the second leg.

Rangers qualified for Europe on the last day of the season, beating Motherwell 2–0 at Ibrox.

The Glasgow Cup was won with a 3–2 victory over Celtic at Ibrox in May. This match presented an early opportunity for the players to impress their new boss.

== Results ==
All results are written with Rangers' score first.

=== Scottish Premier Division ===
Date	Opponent	Venue	Result	Attendance	Scorers
10 August 1985	Dundee United	H	1–0	28,035	McCoist
17 August 1985	Hibernian	A	3–1	14,500	McCoist, McPherson, Williamson
24 August 1985	Heart of Midlothian	H	3–1	35,483	Williamson (2), Burns
31 August 1985	Celtic	A	1–1	58,365	McCoist
7 September 1985	St Mirren	H	3–0	27,707	Fleck, Cooper, Burns
14 September 1985	Clydebank	A	1–0	9,980	Williamson
21 September 1985	Dundee	H	0–1	23,600	
28 September 1985	Aberdeen	H	0–3	37,599	
5 October 1985	Motherwell	A	3–0	12,711	McCoist (2), McPherson
12 October 1985	Dundee United	A	1–1	15,821	McCoist
19 October 1985	Hibernian	H	1–2	23,478	Cooper (pen.)
26 October 1985	St Mirren	A	1–2	13,911	McCoist
2 November 1985	Clydebank	H	0–0	16,943	
9 November 1985	Celtic	H	3–0	42,045	Durrant, Cooper, McMinn
16 November 1985	Heart of Midlothian	A	0–3	23,083	
23 November 1985	Dundee	A	2–3	10,798	McCoist (2)
7 December 1985	Motherwell	H	1–0	12,872	McCoist
14 December 1985	Dundee United	H	1–1	17,786	McCoist
21 December 1985	Hibernian	A	1–1	10,823	Cooper
28 December 1985	Heart of Midlothian	H	0–2	33,410	
1 January 1986	Celtic	A	0–2	49,812	
4 January 1986	Dundee	H	5–0	13,954	McCoist (3), Williamson, Fleck
11 January 1986	Clydebank	H	4–2	12,731	Paterson, McPherson, Williamson, McCoist
18 January 1986	St Mirren	H	2–0	17,528	McCoist, McPherson
1 February 1986	Aberdeen	H	1–1	29,887	Burns
8 February 1986	Motherwell	A	0–1	11,619	
19 February 1986	Aberdeen	A	0–1	19,500	
22 February 1986	Dundee United	A	1–1	14,644	McCoist
1 March 1986	Hibernian	H	3–1	16,574	McCoist (3, 1 (pen.))
15 March 1986	Dundee	A	1–2	10,965	McCoist
22 March 1986	Celtic	H	4-4	41,006	Fraser(2), McCoist, Fleck
29 March 1986	Heart of Midlothian	A	1–3	24,740	McCoist (pen.)
12 April 1986	Clydebank	A	1–2	7,027	Durrant
19 April 1986	St Mirren	A	1–2	9,760	Dawson
26 April 1986	Aberdeen	A	1–1	17,000	McMinn
3 May 1986	Motherwell	H	2–0	21,500	McPherson, McCoist (pen.)

=== UEFA Cup ===
Date	Round	Opponent	Venue	Result	Attendance	Scorers
18 September 1985	R1	Osasuna	H	1–0	29,479	Paterson
2 October 1985	R1	Osasuna	A	0–2	25,600	

=== Scottish Cup ===
Date	Round	Opponent	Venue	Result	Attendance	Scorers
25 January 1986	R3	Heart of Midlothian	A	2–3	27,442	McCoist, Durrant

=== League Cup ===
Date	Round	Opponent	Venue	Result	Attendance	Scorers
21 August 1985	R2	Clyde	H	5–0	11,350	Williamson (3, 1 (pen.)), McCoist, Paterson
27 August 1985	R3	Forfar Athletic	A	2–2*	7,283	Cooper (pen.), Williamson
4 September 1985	QF	Hamilton Academical	A	2–1	12,392	Williamson (2)
25 September 1985	SF L1	Hibernian	A	0–2	17,916	
9 October 1985	SF L2	Hibernian	H	1–0	39,282	Cooper

*Rangers won 6–5 on penalties

=== Glasgow Cup ===
Date	Round	Opponent	Venue	Result	Attendance	Scorers
9 September 1985	1984–85 F	Queen's Park	N	5–0	3,584	Fraser (3), Ferguson, McCoist (pen)
12 November 1985	SF	Queen's Park	A	2–1	1,724	McCoist (2)
9 May 1986	F	Celtic	H	3–2	40,741	McCoist (3)

== Appearances ==
Player	Position	Appearances	Goals
(Scotland) Nicky Walker	GK	42	0
(Scotland) Peter McCloy	GK	2	0
(Scotland) Hugh Burns	DF	35	3
(Scotland) Stuart Munro	DF	36	0
(Scotland) Dave McPherson	DF	42	5
(Scotland) Craig Paterson	DF	25	3
(Scotland) Ally Dawson	DF	26	1
(Scotland) Stuart Beattie	DF	5	0
(Scotland) Derek Johnstone	DF	11	0
(Scotland) Scott Nisbet	DF	5	0
(Canada) Colin Miller	DF	3	0
(Scotland) Ian Durrant	MF	37	3
(Scotland) Ally McCoist	FW	40	27
(Scotland) Bobby Russell	MF	35	0
(Scotland) Bobby Williamson	FW	31	12
(Scotland) Derek Ferguson	MF	21	0
(Scotland) Davie Cooper	MF	39	6
(Scotland) Ted McMinn	MF	32	1
(Scotland) Dave MacKinnon	DF	27	0
(Scotland) Dougie Bell	MF	29	0
(Scotland) Robert Fleck	MF	16	3
(Scotland) Iain Ferguson	MF	6	0
(Scotland) Cammy Fraser	MF	10	2
(Scotland) Eric Ferguson	FW	1	0
(Scotland) John MacDonald	FW	4	0

== League table ==
Pos	Team	Pld	W	D	L	GF	GA	GD	Pts	Qualification
3	Dundee United	36	18	11	7	59	31	+28	47	Qualification for the UEFA Cup first round
4	Aberdeen	36	16	12	8	62	31	+31	44	Qualification for the Cup Winners' Cup first round
5	Rangers	36	13	9	14	53	45	+8	35	Qualification for the UEFA Cup first round
6	Dundee	36	14	7	15	45	51	−6	35	
7	St Mirren	36	13	5	18	42	63	−21	31	

Source: Rsssf
Rules for classification: 1) points; 2) goal difference; 3) number of goals scored.

== See also ==
- 1985–86 in Scottish football
- 1985–86 Scottish Cup
- 1985–86 Scottish League Cup
- 1985–86 UEFA Cup
