= 1980–81 Rangers F.C. season =

Rangers
1980–81 season
- Chairman: Rae Simpson
- Manager: John Greig
- Ground: Ibrox Park
- Scottish Premier Division: 3rd P36 W16 D12 L8 F60 A32 Pts44
- Scottish Cup: Winners
- League Cup: Third round
- Anglo-Scottish Cup: Quarter-finals
- Glasgow Cup: Semi-finals
- Top goalscorer: League: Colin McAdam (12); All: Colin McAdam (21)

The 1980–81 season was the 101st season of competitive football by Rangers.

== Overview ==
Rangers played a total of 47 competitive matches during the 1980–81 season. The summer of 1980 saw Greig bring in Jim Bett from Lokeren for £150,000. Bett was joined by Colin McAdam a £165,000 signing from Partick Thistle. The side got off to a good start in the league, going on a fifteen match unbeaten run, including two Old Firm wins, was to end in November. A disastrous run in November and December all but ended the title challenge as the team finished third, twelve points behind champions Celtic.

The League Cup campaign was halted after a controversial defeat to Aberdeen in a match where the Dons were awarded two contentious penalties. Due to having no European participation, Rangers entered the Anglo-Scottish Cup which led to a defeat at the hands of English minnows, Chesterfield. The Third Division side held Rangers to a 1–1 draw at Ibrox before defeating Rangers 3–0 in the away leg at Saltergate. Rangers did win the 1981 Scottish Cup Final after beating Dundee United 4–1 in a final replay. After a tedious 0–0 draw where Ian Redford missed a last minute penalty, Rangers won the replay with goals from Davie Cooper, a John MacDonald double and Bobby Russell.

== Results ==
All results are written with Rangers' score first.

=== Scottish Premier Division ===
Date	Opponent	Venue	Result	Attendance	Scorers
9 August 1980	Airdrieonians	A	1–1	16,000	MacDonald
16 August 1980	Partick Thistle	H	4–0	25,898	Cooper, McAdam, MacDonald, Jardine
23 August 1980	Celtic	A	2–1	58,102	Bett, Miller
6 September 1980	Dundee United	A	4–2	16,269	Cooper, McAdam, MacDonald, Hegarty (o.g.)
13 September 1980	Aberdeen	H	1–1	34,000	McAdam
20 September 1980	Kilmarnock	A	8–1	15,021	MacDonald (3), Redford (2, 1 (pen.)), McAdam, Jardine, Bett
27 September 1980	St Mirren	H	2–0	30,000	Bett, Cooper
4 October 1980	Morton	A	2–2	15,000	Miller (pen), McAdam
11 October 1980	Heart of Midlothian	H	3–1	22,443	McAdam (2), Jefferies (o.g.)
18 October 1980	Airdrieonians	H	0–0	23,000	
25 October 1980	Partick Thistle	A	1–1	14,250	McAdam
1 November 1980	Celtic	H	3–0	36,000	McAdam (2), MacDonald
8 November 1980	St Mirren	A	0–0	17,362	
15 November 1980	Kilmarnock	H	2–0	25,791	Johnston, Jardine
22 November 1980	Heart of Midlothian	A	0–0	16,315	
29 November 1980	Morton	H	0–1	20,000	
13 December 1980	Aberdeen	A	0–2	22,500	
20 December 1980	Kilmarnock	A	1–1	9,172	Russell
1 January 1981	Partick Thistle	H	1–1	21,326	McAdam
3 January 1981	Airdrieonians	A	1–1	11,800	Dawson
10 January 1981	Morton	A	2–0	13,000	MacDonald, Redford
31 January 1981	Aberdeen	H	1–0	32,500	Johnstone
7 February 1981	Dundee United	A	1–2	14,328	MacDonald
21 February 1981	Celtic	A	1–3	52,800	Johnstone
28 February 1981	Airdrieonians	H	2–0	12,200	MacDonald, Redford
14 March 1981	Heart of Midlothian	A	1–2	11,500	Redford
18 March 1981	Dundee United	H	1–4	14,000	McAdam
21 March 1981	Kilmarnock	H	2–0	8,488	Redford, Russell
28 March 1981	St Mirren	A	1–2	9,988	Dawson
1 April 1981	Morton	H	4–0	7,202	Johnstone (2), Redford, MacDonald
4 April 1981	Dundee United	H	2–1	16,000	Russell, Redford (pen.)
15 April 1981	St Mirren	H	1–0	10,000	Russell
18 April 1981	Celtic	H	0–1	36,000	
22 April 1981	Aberdeen	A	0–0	11,500	
25 April 1981	Partick Thistle	A	1–1	7,077	Russell
2 May 1981	Heart of Midlothian	H	4–0	9,770	Bett, Russell, Redford, Johnston

=== Scottish Cup ===
Date	Round	Opponent	Venue	Result	Attendance	Scorers
24 January 1981	R3	Airdrieonians	A	5–0	16,054	Johnstone (2), Stevens, Redford, Bett
14 February 1981	R4	St Johnstone	A	3–3	17,595	Redford (2), McAdam
18 February 1981	R4 R	St Johnstone	H	3–1	30,000	McAdam (2), Stevens
7 March 1981	QF	Hibernian	H	3–1	26,345	Russell, McAdam, MacDonald
11 April 1981	SF	Morton	N	2–1	27,050	Jackson, Russell
9 May 1981	F	Dundee United	N	0–0	53,346	
12 May 1981	F R	Dundee United	N	4–1	43,099	MacDonald (2), Cooper, Russell

=== League Cup ===
Date	Round	Opponent	Venue	Result	Attendance	Scorers
27 August 1980	R2 L1	Forfar Athletic	A	2–0	4,500	McAdam (2)
30 August 1980	R2 L2	Forfar Athletic	H	3–1	15,500	Miller (pen.), Johnstone, McAdam (pen.)
3 September 1980	R3 L1	Aberdeen	H	1–0	33,000	McAdam
24 September 1980	R3 L2	Aberdeen	A	1–3	23,926	McAdam

=== Anglo-Scottish Cup ===
Date	Round	Opponent	Venue	Result	Attendance	Scorers
30 July 1980	R1 L1	Partick Thistle	H	3–1		MacDonald (2), Jardine
6 August 1980	R1 L2	Partick Thistle	A	2–3		
13 October 1980	R2 L1	Chesterfield	H	1–1		Dalziel
28 October 1980	R2 L2	Chesterfield	A	0–3		

=== Glasgow Cup ===
Date	Round	Opponent	Venue	Result	Attendance	Scorers
12 January 1981	SF	Partick Thistle	A	0–1	4,000	

== Appearances ==
Player	Position	Appearances	Goals
(Scotland) Peter McCloy	GK	34	0
(Scotland) Jim Stewart	GK	13	0
(Scotland) Sandy Jardine	DF	42	3
(Scotland) Alex Forsyth	DF	1	0
(Scotland) Tom Forsyth	DF	30	0
(Scotland) Colin Jackson	DF	38	1
(Scotland) Alex Miller	DF	33	3
(Scotland) Gregor Stevens	DF	14	2
(Scotland) Ally Dawson	DF	29	2
(Scotland) Jim Bett	MF	45	5
(Scotland) Davie Cooper	MF	34	4
(Scotland) Bobby Russell	MF	35	9
(Scotland) Colin McAdam	FW	40	21
(Scotland) Ian Redford	MF	46	12
(Scotland) John MacDonald	FW	38	14
(Scotland) Willie Johnston	MF	37	2
(Scotland) Derek Johnstone	FW	33	7
(Scotland) Tommy McLean	MF	34	0
(Scotland) Billy MacKay	MF	6	0
(Scotland) Robert Clark	DF	1	0

== League table ==
Pos	Team	Pld	W	D	L	GF	GA	GD	Pts	Qualification or relegation
1	Celtic (C)	36	26	4	6	84	37	+47	56	Qualification for the European Cup first round
2	Aberdeen	36	19	11	6	61	26	+35	49	Qualification for the UEFA Cup first round
3	Rangers	36	16	12	8	60	32	+28	44	Qualification for the Cup Winners' Cup first round
4	St Mirren	36	18	8	10	56	47	+9	44	
5	Dundee United	36	17	9	10	66	42	+24	43	Qualification for the UEFA Cup first round

Source: Statto
Rules for classification: 1) points; 2) goal difference; 3) number of goals scored.
(C) Champions

== See also ==
- 1980–81 in Scottish football
- 1980–81 Scottish Cup
- 1980–81 Scottish League Cup
