= Andrew Bruce =

Andrew Bruce may refer to:

- Andrew Bruce (athlete) (born 1958), athlete from Trinidad and Tobago
- Andrew Davis Bruce (1894–1969), former Major General and President of the University of Houston
- Andy Bruce (born 1964), Scottish former professional football player
- Andrew A. Bruce (1866–1934), North Dakota Supreme Court justice
- Andrew Bruce (bishop) (c.1630–1699), Scottish bishop
- Andrew Bruce, 11th Earl of Elgin (born 1924), Scottish nobleman
