= 1979–80 Rangers F.C. season =

Rangers
1979–80 season
- Chairman: Rae Simpson
- Manager: John Greig
- Ground: Ibrox Park
- Scottish Premier Division: 5th P36 W15 D9 L14 F50 A46 Pts37
- Scottish Cup: Runners-up
- League Cup: Third round
- Cup Winners' Cup: Second round
- Glasgow Cup: Not completed
- Drybrough Cup: Winners
- Tennent Caledonian Cup: Winners
- Top goalscorer: League: Derek Johnstone (15); All: Derek Johnstone (21)

The 1979–80 season was the 100th season of competitive football by Rangers.

== Overview ==
Rangers played a total of 52 competitive matches during the 1979–80 season. Rangers finished fifth in the league, eleven points behind champions Aberdeen. The main cause for such a poor showing in the league was pointed at the team's away form, only ten points from eighteen matches.

Aberdeen also knocked Rangers out of the Scottish League Cup over a two-legged third round tie. Rangers did reach the 1980 Scottish Cup Final only to lose out to Old Firm rivals Celtic, 1-0 thanks to a deflected George McCluskey shot in extra time. The European Cup Winner's Cup campaign was ended by the eventual winners Valencia CF after having seen off Lillestrøm SK and Fortuna Düsseldorf in previous rounds.

== Results ==
All results are written with Rangers' score first.

=== Scottish Premier Division ===
Date	Opponent	Venue	Result	Attendance	Scorers
11 August 1979	Hibernian	A	3–1	17,731	A.MacDonald, Cooper, Russell
18 August 1979	Celtic	H	2–2	36,000	J.MacDonald, Russell
25 August 1979	Partick Thistle	A	1–2	20,000	Johnstone
8 September 1979	St Mirren	H	3–1	31,000	Johnstone, Smith, Miller
15 September 1979	Aberdeen	A	1–3	25,000	Johnstone
22 September 1979	Dundee	H	2–0	25,000	Johnstone, Glennie (o.g.)
29 September 1979	Kilmarnock	A	1–2	15,479	Johnstone
6 October 1979	Dundee United	A	0–0	19,464	
13 October 1979	Morton	H	2–2	25,000	Johnstone (2)
20 October 1979	Hibernian	H	2–0	25,000	Smith, Miller (pen.)
27 October 1979	Celtic	A	0–1	61,000	
3 November 1979	Partick Thistle	H	2–1	18,400	Urquhart (2)
10 November 1979	St Mirren	A	1–2	17,362	A.Forsyth
17 November 1979	Aberdeen	H	0–1	18,500	
24 November 1979	Dundee	A	1–3	13,342	Jackson
1 December 1979	Kilmarnock	H	2–1	16,557	Johnstone, Russell
8 December 1979	Morton	A	1–0	14,750	Johnstone
15 December 1979	Dundee United	H	2–1	19,240	Johnstone, Kopel (o.g.)
22 December 1979	Hibernian	A	1–2	18,740	McLean
29 December 1979	Celtic	H	1–1	36,000	Johnstone
5 January 1980	St Mirren	H	1–2	19,000	Jardine (pen.)
12 January 1980	Aberdeen	A	2–3	19,250	J.MacDonald, Jackson
23 February 1980	Morton	H	3–1	28,000	Russell, Smith, J.MacDonald
1 March 1980	Hibernian	H	1–0	29,500	Johnstone
12 March 1980	Dundee	H	1–0	17,000	Stevens
15 March 1980	Partick Thistle	H	0–0	22,000	
19 March 1980	Dundee United	A	0–0	9,533	
29 March 1980	Aberdeen	H	2–2	25,000	Jardine (pen.), J.MacDonald
2 April 1980	Celtic	A	0–1	60,000	
5 April 1980	Dundee	A	4–1	12,948	Johnstone (2), Cooper, Smith
19 April 1980	Morton	A	1–0	15,000	Russell
23 April 1980	Kilmarnock	A	0–1	8,504	
25 April 1980	Dundee United	H	2–1	19,000	Jardine (pen.), McLean
30 April 1980	Kilmarnock	H	1–0	7,655	J.MacDonald
3 May 1980	Partick Thistle	A	3–4	15,000	Russell (2), Johnstone
7 May 1980	St Mirren	A	1–4	12,000	Miller

=== Cup Winners' Cup ===
Date	Round	Opponent	Venue	Result	Attendance	Scorers
21 August 1979	QR1	Lillestrøm	H	1–0	25,000	Smith
5 September 1979	QR1	Lillestrøm	A	2–0	6,175	A.MacDonald, Johnstone
19 September 1979	R1	Fortuna Düsseldorf	H	2–1	36,000	A.MacDonald, McLean
3 October 1979	R1	Fortuna Düsseldorf	A	0–0	47,000	
24 October 1979	R2	Valencia	A	1–1	61,000	McLean
7 November 1979	R2	Valencia	H	1–3	36,000	Johnstone

=== Scottish Cup ===
Date	Round	Opponent	Venue	Result	Attendance	Scorers
26 January 1980	R3	Clyde	A	2–2	12,500	Jardine (pen.), Jackson
30 January 1980	R3 R	Clyde	H	2–0	12,000	J.MacDonald (2)
16 February 1980	R4	Dundee United	H	1–0	29,000	Johnstone
8 March 1980	QF	Heart of Midlothian	H	6–1	36,000	J.MacDonald (2), Cooper, Jardine (pen.), Russell, Johnstone
12 April 1980	SF	Aberdeen	N	1–0	50,209	Johnstone
10 May 1980	F	Celtic	N	0–1	70,303	

=== League Cup ===
Date	Round	Opponent	Venue	Result	Attendance	Scorers
29 August 1979	R2	Clyde	A	2–1	5,021	Dawson, Robertson
1 September 1979	R2	Clyde	H	4–0	16,000	MacKay (2), Smith, O'Neill (o.g.)
26 September 1979	R3	Aberdeen	A	1–3	22,000	Johnstone
10 October 1979	R3	Aberdeen	H	0–2	35,000	

=== Non-competitive ===
==== Drybrough Cup ====
Date	Round	Opponent	Venue	Result	Attendance	Scorers
28 July 1979	R1	Berwick Rangers	H	1–0	15,000	A MacDonald
1 August 1979	SF	Kilmarnock	A	2–0	10,035	J MacDonald (2)
4 August 1979	F	Celtic	N	3–1	40,609	J MacDonald, Jardine, Cooper

==== Tennent Caledonian Cup ====
Date	Round	Opponent	Venue	Result	Attendance	Scorers
3 August 1979	SF	West Ham United	H	3–2		
5 August 1979	F	Kilmarnock	H	2–2		

==== Glasgow Cup ====
Date	Round	Opponent	Venue	Result	Attendance	Scorers
15 August 1979	SF	Partick Thistle	A	2–0✝	7,000	Smith, Cooper

✝Competition not completed

== Appearances ==
Player	Position	Appearances	Goals
(Scotland) Peter McCloy	GK	50	0
(Scotland) George Young	GK	2	0
(Scotland) Alex Miller	DF	30	3
(Scotland) Ally Dawson	DF	46	1
(Scotland) Sandy Jardine	DF	51	5
(Scotland) Colin Jackson	DF	42	3
(Scotland) Kenny Watson	MF	26	0
(Scotland) Tommy McLean	MF	39	4
(Scotland) Bobby Russell	MF	33	8
(Scotland) Derek Johnstone	FW	47	21
(Scotland) Alex MacDonald	MF	39	3
(Scotland) Davie Cooper	MF	43	3
(Scotland) John MacDonald	FW	35	9
(Scotland) Gordon Smith	FW	45	6
(Scotland) Gregor Stevens	DF	39	1
(Scotland) Derek Parlane	FW	6	0
(Scotland) Alex Forsyth	DF	11	1
(Scotland) Billy Urquhart	FW	6	2
(Scotland) Gordon Dalziel	MF	2	0
(Scotland) Billy MacKay	MF	5	2
(Scotland) Tom Forsyth	DF	22	0
(Scotland) Ian Redford	MF	13	0
(Scotland) Chris Robertson	FW	3	1

== League table ==
Pos	Team	Pld	W	D	L	GF	GA	GD	Pts	Qualification or relegation
3	St Mirren	36	15	12	9	56	49	+7	42	Qualification for the UEFA Cup first round
4	Dundee United	36	12	13	11	43	30	+13	37	Qualification for the UEFA Cup first round
5	Rangers	36	15	7	14	50	46	+4	37	
6	Morton	36	14	8	14	51	46	+5	36	
7	Partick Thistle	36	11	14	11	43	47	−4	36	

Source: Statto and RSSSF
Rules for classification: 1) points; 2) goal difference; 3) number of goals scored.

== See also ==
- 1979–80 in Scottish football
- 1979–80 Scottish Cup
- 1979–80 Scottish League Cup
- 1979–80 European Cup Winners' Cup
