= 1984–85 Scottish League Cup =

Tournament details
- Country: Scotland

Final positions
- Champions: Rangers
- Runners-up: Dundee United

Tournament statistics
- Top goal scorer: Ally McCoist (5)

The 1984–85 Scottish League Cup was the thirty-ninth season of Scotland's second football knockout competition. The competition was won by Rangers, who defeated Dundee United in the Final.

== First round ==
Home team	Score	Away team	Date
Albion Rovers	2–0	Montrose	14 August 1984
Dunfermline Ath	4–0	Arbroath	15 August 1984
East Stirlingshire	1–1	Berwick Rangers	15 August 1984
Queen of the South	2–1	Queen's Park	15 August 1984
Stirling Albion	2–0	Stenhousemuir	15 August 1984
Stranraer	0–3	Cowdenbeath	15 August 1984

== Second round ==
Home team	Score	Away team	Date
Airdrieonians	3–1	Aberdeen	21 August 1984
Ayr United	1–0	Motherwell	21 August 1984
Cowdenbeath	3–0	Partick Thistle	21 August 1984
Dundee	3–0	Hamilton Academical	21 August 1984
Dundee United	5–0	Forfar Athletic	21 August 1984
Dunfermline Ath	2–3	Celtic	21 August 1984
Heart of Midlothian	4–0	East Stirlingshire	21 August 1984
Hibernian	1–0	East Fife	21 August 1984
Kilmarnock	1–1	Alloa Athletic	21 August 1984
Meadowbank Thistle	2–1	Morton	21 August 1984
Queen of the South	1–2	Dumbarton	21 August 1984
Raith Rovers	2–0	Clydebank	21 August 1984
Rangers	1–0	Falkirk	21 August 1984
St Johnstone	2–1	Albion Rovers	21 August 1984
St Mirren	1–0	Clyde	21 August 1984
Stirling Albion	1–4	Brechin City	21 August 1984

== Third round ==
Home team	Score	Away team	Date
Airdrieonians	0–4	Celtic	29 August 1984
Brechin City	2–4	St Johnstone	29 August 1984
Cowdenbeath	2–0	St Mirren	29 August 1984
Dumbarton	0–4	Dundee United	29 August 1984
Dundee	1–1	Kilmarnock	29 August 1984
Heart of Midlothian	1–0	Ayr United	29 August 1984
Hibernian	1–2	Meadowbank Thistle	29 August 1984
Rangers	4–0	Raith Rovers	29 August 1984

== Quarter-finals ==
Home team	Score	Away team	Date
Cowdenbeath	1–3	Rangers	5 September 1984
Dundee	0–1	Heart of Midlothian	4 September 1984
Dundee United	2–1	Celtic	5 September 1984
Meadowbank Thistle	2–1	St Johnstone	5 September 1984

== Semi-finals ==
=== First leg ===
Home team	Score	Away team	Date
Heart of Midlothian	1–2	Dundee United	26 September 1984
Rangers	4–0	Meadowbank Thistle	26 September 1984

=== Second leg ===
Home team	Score	Away team	Date	Agg
Dundee United	3–1	Heart of Midlothian	10 October 1984	5–2
Meadowbank Thistle	1–1	Rangers	9 October 1984	1–5

== Final ==
28 October 1984

Rangers	1–0	Dundee United
Ferguson 44'

Hampden Park, Glasgow
Attendance: 44,698
Referee: Brian McGinlay
