= Ally McCoist =

Scottish footballer (born 1962)

Ally McCoist OBE
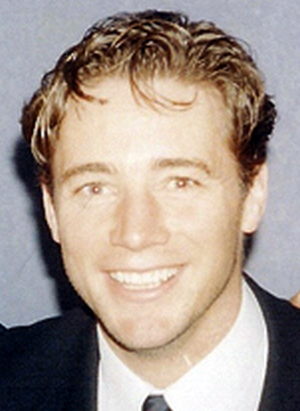
- McCoist in 1994

Personal information
- Full name: Alistair Murdoch McCoist
- Date of birth: 24 September 1962 (age 64)
- Place of birth: Bellshill, Lanarkshire, Scotland
- Position: Striker

Youth career
- –1978: Fir Park Boys Club

Senior career*
Years	Team	Apps	(Gls)
1978–1981	St Johnstone	57	(22)
1981–1983	Sunderland	56	(8)
1983–1998	Rangers	418	(251)
1998–2001	Kilmarnock	53	(9)
Total		584	(290)

International career
1980–1981	Scotland U19	10	(7)
1983	Scotland U21	1	(0)
1986–1998	Scotland	61	(19)
1990	SFA (SFL centenary)	1	(0)

Managerial career
- 2011–2014: Rangers
- * Club domestic league appearances and goals

Alistair Murdoch McCoist (/məˈkɔɪst/; born 24 September 1962) is a Scottish former footballer who has since worked as a manager and TV pundit.

McCoist began his playing career with Scottish club St Johnstone, before moving to English side Sunderland in 1981. He returned to his homeland two years later, signing with Rangers. McCoist had a highly successful career with Rangers, becoming the club's record goalscorer and winning nine successive league championships between 1988–89 and 1996–97. He later played for Kilmarnock.

McCoist was inducted into the Scottish Sports Hall of Fame in 2007. He is also a member of the Scottish Football Hall of Fame, having gained 61 international caps. A prolific striker, he is the fifth-highest all-time goalscorer in the top tier of the Scottish football league system, having scored 260 times for Rangers and Kilmarnock between 1983 and 2001.

Towards the end of his playing career, McCoist started a media career. Between 1996 and 2007, he was a team captain on the BBC sports quiz A Question of Sport. He began to scale back his media commitments in 2007, when he became an assistant manager to Walter Smith at Rangers. He succeeded Smith as Rangers manager in 2011, but the club then suffered from serious financial difficulties. Rangers went into liquidation in 2012 and the club was placed in the fourth tier of Scottish league football. McCoist helped them win successive promotions to the second tier, but after a poor start to the 2014–15 season McCoist handed in his 12 months' notice in December 2014 and was placed on gardening leave. In September 2015, McCoist and Rangers mutually agreed to terminate his contract.

== Early life ==
Born at Bellshill Maternity Hospital and raised in East Kilbride, McCoist attended Maxwellton Primary and Hunter High School. His high-school team coach and chemistry teacher was former Clyde and Scotland forward Archie Robertson, who was acknowledged by McCoist for his guidance and influence, but who died in 1978 just as his protégé's career was taking off. Upon leaving school, McCoist had a short spell working as a clerical assistant in the Overseas Development Administration (now the Foreign Commonwealth and Development Office) branch office at Hairmyres. The role offered flexible working arrangements, allowing him to organise his hours around his football career.

== Playing career ==
=== St Johnstone ===
McCoist's first professional club was St Johnstone, having signed from Fir Park Boys Club in 1978. He had been denied a move to St Mirren because Alex Ferguson thought he was not good enough. "When I was 14, 15, Sir Alex used to pick me up from school. I used to go to Hunter High in East Kilbride, and he stayed up in Greenhills, I think it was, in East Kilbride. And he used to pick me up – myself and another lad, Stevie Cowan, who he did sign at St Mirren and went to Aberdeen with him. We'd train with the S-forms, and Sir Alex would take the training with the first team and the reserves. And then Stevie and I would wait, and Sir Alex would give us a couple of quid and we'd nip round to the chippie in Love Street. We'd go back and wait for Sir Alex finishing, and then he would drop us off at the house."

McCoist made his debut for St Johnstone on 7 April 1979 in a 3–0 win over Raith Rovers. He did not score his first goal for the club until he scored Saints' final goal in a 3–0 win against Dumbarton in August 1980. He went on to score 23 goals in 43 appearances that season, including a consolation against Rangers in a 3–1 defeat in a Scottish Cup replay.

Due to his form with both St Johnstone and the Scotland under-18 side, McCoist gained the attention of several English clubs, including Sunderland, Wolverhampton Wanderers, Middlesbrough and Tottenham Hotspur.

He started the 1981–82 season with four goals in five League Cup games, including the opening goal in a 2–0 win over Celtic at Muirton Park and the consolation in a 4–1 defeat in the corresponding fixture at Parkhead.

=== Sunderland ===
Sunderland manager Alan Durban signed McCoist in August 1981. The £400,000 transfer fee spent on the striker made him Sunderland's record signing. McCoist's time at Sunderland was unsuccessful, however: he scored nine goals in 65 appearances for a side struggling at the foot of the English First Division. He managed two goals during the 1981–82 season, his first coming against Nottingham Forest and his second a curling effort from the edge of the box against Southampton.

Three goals in three pre-season games against Dundee, Dunfermline Athletic and former team St Johnstone were followed by a goal against European champions Aston Villa on the opening day of the 1982–83 season in a 3–1 win. He followed this up with a goal against Brighton & Hove Albion, meaning he had matched his previous season's tally midway through September.

October 1982 proved to be the highlight of McCoist's spell with Sunderland, as he scored five goals in as many games against Norwich City, Southampton, Manchester City, Everton and Wolverhampton Wanderers. With seven goals scored by the end of October, McCoist failed to score another goal in a Sunderland shirt. Despite this, he finished third-top scorer for Sunderland in 1982–83, one goal behind Nick Pickering.

In early 1983, Alan Durban invited McCoist into his office and informed him that Rangers' John Greig had called him with an interest in signing the player. "He said, 'Do you fancy it?'" recalled McCoist. "And I said, 'Aye. I've got to be honest with you.' He said, 'I think you should go, for the simple fact that I don't think I'll be here in three or four months.' Sure enough, he got the sack relatively soon after that."

=== Rangers ===
At the end of the 1982–83 season, McCoist returned to Scotland and joined Rangers for a fee of £185,000. On his dream move, McCoist recalled: "I met John Greig and Tommy McLean at the Crest Hotel, at the roundabout in Carlisle. I went to a payphone and phoned my wee grannie in Thornliebank. First person I phoned. I can still hear her – obviously not with us now – but I can still hear her voice down the phone. You could have given her a million pounds and it wouldn't have meant just as much."

During his fifteen years with Rangers, McCoist achieved an array of honours, including ten league championship medals. This began with a title in the 1986–87 season and included the whole "Nine in a Row" period between 1989 and 1997. He also won a Scottish Cup winner's medal and nine Scottish League Cup winner's medals. He was the first player to be Europe's top goalscorer twice in a row (in 1992 and 1993), and in 1992 won Scottish football's two most prestigious Player of the Year awards.

McCoist made his competitive debut for the Ibrox side against St Mirren on the opening day of the 1983–84 season, and scored twenty goals that year. Nonetheless, he got a tough time from the supporters. "When I look back, do I regret it? No, because it actually made me stronger. If I didn't handle that at all, I wouldn't have stayed at the club and I would have been away down the road. At that time, Jock Wallace probably would have sold me." McCoist scored a hat-trick in the League Cup final victory over Celtic in March 1984. With Rangers still a team very much in the doldrums, he managed 18 goals the following season.

McCoist scored 24 goals in the 1985–86 season. He made his international debut against the Netherlands in 1986, the same year Graeme Souness arrived at Rangers to begin the Ibrox revolution. "He certainly transformed Rangers Football Club, but he also transformed Scottish football," said McCoist of Souness' time at Ibrox. "Two of his first three signings were Terry Butcher, the England captain, and Chris Woods, the England goalkeeper. The whole place just erupted into a new level."

McCoist scored another hat-trick in the Glasgow Cup final against Celtic to bring further accolades his way, and he was an ever-present in Rangers' title-winning side of 1987, scoring 34 goals along the way.

McCoist's tally of 31 goals in 1987–88 could not prevent Celtic regaining the league title and, although Rangers recaptured their crown in 1988–89, McCoist played only 19 games. That title win was the first of nine-in-a-row, but McCoist found himself in and out of the first team for the first three of those successes. During the 1990–91 season, Mo Johnston and new signing Mark Hateley were the preferred front pairing, and when McCoist attended the Cheltenham Festival when the players were given free time prior to back-to-back games against Celtic, he was dropped from the match squad by Souness and forced to apologise, for breaching team discipline, in a press conference. He returned to the team for the second of the matches after Hateley was sent off in the first, but Rangers lost both without scoring and his future at the club seemed uncertain.

When Walter Smith took over from Souness in April 1991, McCoist returned to the fore and came back from a hernia on the final day of the season as the club won the title. Despite starting the next season on the bench due to further minor injuries, McCoist won both the Players' Player of the Year and the Sportswriters' awards. During this 1991–92 campaign, he scored 34 times in the league, forming an effective partnership with Hateley (Johnston had since left the club) as Rangers completed a domestic double. Those goals made him the top European goalscorer of the season (he received a golden boot trophy from sponsors Adidas, though it is not counted in the official European Golden Shoe listings due to the award being suspended by organisers at the time), ensuring his position with two long-range strikes in the final fixture of the season away to Aberdeen, a match he later admitted he had barely been in a condition to play, having spent the previous night drinking with students in the team hotel. He had scored the only goal of the Scottish Cup semi-final, an Old Firm meeting in which Rangers played 85 minutes with only ten men, and rounded off the season with the decisive goal in the 1992 Scottish Cup final. Regarding the Golden Boot, McCoist joked: "There was some wee Romanian guy. You know what it's like: I think he needed to score nine in the last game of the season to beat me. I think he got eight. It was one of those ones. I think he scored his seventh in the 98th minute and scored his eighth in the 114th minute. You're never sure with that mob."

He repeated that scoring feat a year later in 1992–93, with the same goal tally in the Premier Division, despite missing the last seven matches of the season after breaking his leg playing for Scotland against Portugal in April. He also missed the 1993 Scottish Cup final (having scored the winner in the semi-final to put Rangers through) but still scored a career-best 49 goals from 52 appearances overall for the campaign. After a six-month absence, he returned from the injury by coming off the bench to score an overhead kick to win the 1993 Scottish League Cup final against Hibernian.

As for McCoist's renowned strike partnership with Hateley, the Englishman said: "Alistair was the perfect partner for me. As a finisher, he was an unbelievable goal scorer. He linked with me. All the goal scorer does is he looks at the leader of the line and makes sure he's offset, fifteen yards away. It was a great partnership"

His appearances were limited over the next two seasons as a result of other niggling injuries (37 games and 12 goals, less than his typical output for one campaign), and also had to compete with a string of new signings between 1993 and 1995, including Gordon Durie and Brian Laudrup, for the forward positions.

After recovering his fitness, he played more regularly in the 1995–96 season, scoring 16 league goals and in an Old Firm Scottish Cup semi-final victory (as he had done in 1992 and would again in 1998), though he again missed the resulting final. A tenth Premier Division winner's medal (the completion of nine-in-a-row) and a ninth League Cup win (scoring twice) followed in 1996–97. His last appearance in a Rangers jersey came in the 1998 Scottish Cup final in which he scored during a 2–1 defeat by Heart of Midlothian.

At Rangers, McCoist became the club's record goalscorer, netting 355 goals in all competitions. In addition to this, he holds the club record for number of league goals scored and the number of Scottish League Cup goals scored (with 251 and 54, respectively). He also held the title for the most goals scored by a player in European competitions (21), until his total was overtaken by Alfredo Morelos. McCoist is also third in the all-time appearance table for Rangers, having made 581 appearances for the club.

Reflecting on his time at Rangers in 2018, McCoist said: "My extended family was those boys that I worked with and played with and coached and managed and worked under. It was the greatest experience of my life and I was very, very privileged to play there, coach there and manage there. It was a dream come true."

=== Kilmarnock ===
McCoist finished his career at Kilmarnock, where he spent three seasons alongside long-time Rangers teammate Ian Durrant. After recovering from another broken leg in 1999 (sustained in a match against Rangers) during the last months of his Killie spell, he was an unused substitute in the 2001 Scottish League Cup final defeat to Celtic, then had a penalty saved by Stefan Klos at Rugby Park in what proved to be his final match against his old club. He was denied a cameo appearance from the bench at Ibrox by his manager Bobby Williamson a few weeks later as Kilmarnock were already losing heavily – instead he received an ovation from supporters on the field after the final whistle.

His final game at the age of 38 was at home to Celtic on the last day of the SPL campaign on 20 May 2001, a 1–0 win which enabled Kilmarnock to qualify for the following season's UEFA Cup. Coincidentally, McCoist was substituted off in that match while fellow striker Kris Boyd came off the bench to make his debut; he too went on to be become the club's joint-second league goalscorer of all time, level with Eddie Morrison on 121 goals.

=== International ===
==== Age-group teams ====
McCoist appeared ten times for the Scotland national under-18 football team. He made his debut in a European Under-18 Championship qualifier against Iceland, netting the only goal of the game after 19 minutes. He followed this up by scoring in the return leg, a 3–1 victory which secured Scotland's qualification for the following summer's European Under-18 Championships.

He found the net again in his third appearance, a 3–1 victory over Northern Ireland. His next three appearances came in the prestigious Monaco Youth Tournament, a 1–0 defeat to West Germany, a 2–0 victory over Switzerland and a 1–1 draw with France taking his tally to five goals in six appearances.

McCoist was then selected for Scotland's semi-professional side for a four-team tournament in the Netherlands; however, he failed to make an appearance.

At the European Under-18 finals, Scotland found themselves in a group with Austria, Spain and defending Under-18 champions England. McCoist started all three games as Scotland defeated both Austria and England 1–0, with McCoist netting the winner against the Auld Enemy, meaning the final group game against the Spanish would decide the group. McCoist scored with a free-kick in a 1–1 draw. This result saw Scotland eliminated on goal-difference.

==== Full team ====
McCoist made his Scotland debut, aged 23, on 29 April 1986 in a goalless friendly match against the Netherlands.

He started one game at the 1990 World Cup in Italy (coming on as a late substitute in the other group games) after being an integral part of the qualification bid.

In March 1993, he broke a leg against Portugal in a disastrous qualifying match for the next World Cup (Scotland lost 5–0 and failed to progress).

He captained Scotland once, against Australia on 27 March 1996. He went on to score the winner after 55 minutes in a 1–0 win at Hampden Park.

McCoist scored one major tournament goal: a long-range drive at UEFA Euro 1996 against Switzerland, which was also his last goal for his country; he had started all three of Scotland's matches at UEFA Euro 1992 but failed to score, and was not selected in the squad for the 1998 World Cup despite having scored 16 goals during the preceding season. "I was devastated. It broke my heart. It really did. I remember getting the news down in London that [Craig Brown] wasn't taking me and I greeted my eyes out. I still think it was a massive mistake. I certainly don't think I would have played ninety minutes in all the games, but if we'd needed a goal, I was still probably our best chance. That was the biggest disappointment in my career, not going. Obviously I have spoken to Craig since, and he admits it was a mistake now. And I do appreciate him for saying that. It doesn't soften the blow that I didn't go, but it backs my own theory up that I should have gone."

He made his last two appearances for Scotland after moving from Rangers to Kilmarnock in summer 1998, with his final outing a 3–2 victory over Estonia in October of that year. McCoist is Scotland's fifth-highest scorer, with 19 goals from his 61 caps.

== Managerial career ==
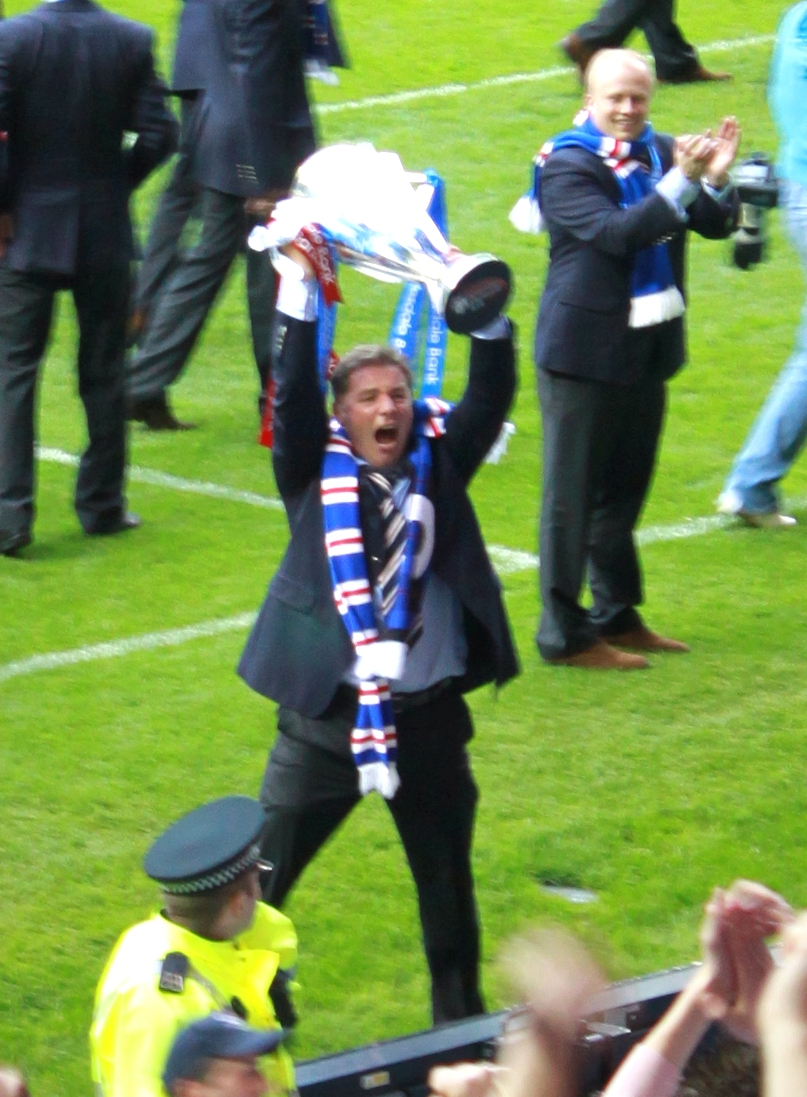
McCoist celebrating with the SPL trophy in 2009

McCoist joined the Scotland coaching staff under his former manager at Rangers, Walter Smith, in 2004. He turned down the managerial position at Inverness Caledonian Thistle in 2006 as he wanted a job nearer his Glasgow home.

=== Rangers ===
==== Smith's assistant (2007–11) ====
McCoist returned to Rangers as an assistant manager to Walter Smith in January 2007. After Rangers' victory over Queen of the South in the 2008 Scottish Cup final, Smith revealed that McCoist had been in charge of the team for the entire cup campaign. "Obviously, Walter had me in mind for the manager's position when he stepped down, and for a couple of the Scottish Cup runs he let me take the team. I'd do the preparation and the training, but obviously he'd be there. I'd do the team talk, all that kind of stuff."

The duo also guided Rangers to the final of that year's UEFA Cup, in which they lost 2–0 to Zenit Saint Petersburg.

On 22 February 2011 he was announced as the new Rangers manager, with effect from June 2011.

==== 2011–12 season ====
Businessman Craig Whyte bought out Sir David Murray as Rangers' majority shareholder in May 2011. Whyte said he was proud to be the owner of Rangers and pledged to invest £25 million into transfers, over five years.

McCoist's first competitive game in charge of Rangers came on 23 July 2011, a 1–1 draw at home to Hearts on the opening day of the 2011–12 SPL. After the game McCoist complained to BBC Scotland about a report that he argued misrepresented his view on violence after Old Firm derbies and the cost of policing the matches. The BBC stood by the report but upheld the complaint about the way the piece had been edited. On Tuesday 26 July 2011, the BBC issued an apology to McCoist and he, in turn, dropped his ban on speaking to them. In April 2011, McCoist had called for Rangers supporters who sung offensive chants to be arrested.

McCoist took charge of his first European game on 26 July 2011 at home to Swedish side Malmö FF in the first leg of a UEFA Champions League third round qualifier, losing 1–0 to suffer his first defeat as Rangers manager. His first win came on 30 July, away to St Johnstone with a 2–0 scoreline, goals coming from Nikica Jelavić and Steven Naismith. McCoist's first Champions League campaign ended at the first hurdle after drawing 1–1 away to Malmo in the Third qualifying round second leg, losing 2–1 on aggregate and having Madjid Bougherra and Steven Whittaker sent off. Despite dropping into the Europa League, McCoist's first European campaign as Rangers manager ended early after another defeat over two legs in the play-off round by NK Maribor.

McCoist made a promising start to his first SPL campaign as manager, with Rangers topping the SPL after the first five fixtures and conceding only one goal. His first Old Firm match as manager was a 4–2 win over Celtic at Ibrox, but his side were shocked by First Division side Falkirk in the League Cup a few days later. McCoist suffered a fourth cup competition exit of the season on 5 February 2012, in a 2–0 defeat at home to Dundee United in the Scottish Cup fifth round.

Despite being within four points of Celtic at the top of the table in February, having been fifteen points clear of their arch rivals at one stage, Rangers' SPL title challenge was virtually ended after the club entered administration on 14 February 2012 and was docked ten points as a consequence. McCoist was able to see out the season with Rangers finishing in second place despite the points deduction.

==== 2012–13 season ====
Following the rejection of a company voluntary arrangement by HM Revenue & Customs, the business and assets of the company running Rangers were sold to a consortium led by Charles Green. McCoist decided to stay after talks with Green. McCoist then worked alongside Green as the club were placed in the Scottish Third Division.

Rangers won the Third Division championship and promotion to the third tier. They exited the Scottish Challenge Cup by losing to Queen of the South in a penalty shoot-out. They defeated Motherwell in the League Cup, but lost 3–0 to Inverness in the quarter-finals at Ibrox. Rangers also suffered a 3–0 defeat in the Scottish Cup, against Dundee United at Tannadice.

==== 2013–14 season ====
Rangers won the Scottish League One championship and promotion to the second tier, as they became the first Rangers side in 115 years to go an entire league season unbeaten. They also progressed to the semi-finals of the Scottish Cup, but lost 3–1 to Dundee United at Ibrox. Rangers reached the 2014 Scottish Challenge Cup final, but lost 1–0 after extra time to Raith Rovers at Easter Road. They suffered a first-round defeat in the Scottish League Cup at Forfar Athletic.

==== 2014–15 season ====
Rangers fell behind Hearts in the 2014–15 Scottish Championship as they lost 2–1 at home and 2–0 away to the Edinburgh club. Rangers progressed to the semi-finals of the 2014–15 Scottish League Cup, but suffered a defeat in the 2014–15 Scottish Challenge Cup against Alloa Athletic. McCoist submitted formal notice of his intention to resign as manager in December 2014 and began serving a 12-month notice period. Later in December, McCoist left his position with Rangers and was placed on gardening leave. This continued until September 2015, when McCoist and Rangers agreed to terminate his contract.

== Media career ==
McCoist is also known for his television work. He was a team captain on the BBC's A Question of Sport from 1996 to 2007 with his rival captains being John Parrott, Frankie Dettori and Matt Dawson, making a record 363 appearances on the show. Having been passed over for Scotland's 1998 World Cup squad, McCoist was recruited to the BBC's punditry team for the tournament, where he proved a popular addition.

He also co-presented a late night chat show McCoist and MacAulay for BBC Scotland from 1998 to 1999 alongside comedian Fred MacAulay. In 2001, McCoist won Sports Presenter of the Year at the TRIC Awards.

In 2000, McCoist also starred in the film A Shot at Glory alongside Robert Duvall, playing Jackie McQuillan, a fictional legendary ex-Celtic player. McCoist wore a Rangers jersey under his Celtic one to keep the material off his skin.

Between 1998 and 2005, McCoist, along with John Motson, appeared as a commentator for the FIFA video games series by EA Sports. They were replaced by Clive Tyldesley and Andy Gray for FIFA 06.

McCoist has been a regular pundit for ITV Sport's football coverage. In 2010, he was a regular co-commentator for ESPN at the 2010 World Cup working alongside Martin Tyler or Derek Rae. McCoist worked for ITV during the 2018 World Cup, and his partnership with main commentator Jon Champion was praised by various media sources.

From the start of the 2017–18 season McCoist worked as a studio pundit for BT Sport's coverage of the SPFL and the Scottish League Cup, appearing regularly on their coverage alongside Darrell Currie, Chris Sutton and Stephen Craigan. From the 2020–21 season, Sky Sports earned exclusive rights to the SPFL, and McCoist continued to feature as a pundit on their coverage.

Since the 2019–20 season he has also been a pundit and commentator for Amazon Prime Video's coverage of English Premier League matches.

== Awards ==
On 10 June 1994, McCoist was awarded the Member of the Order of the British Empire (MBE) for services to football. He was inducted into the Scottish Sports Hall of Fame in 2007 and is also a member of the Scottish Football Hall of Fame. McCoist was inducted into the Scotland national football team roll of honour in March 1996, when he was awarded his 50th international cap. McCoist was appointed Officer of the Order of the British Empire (OBE) in the 2024 Birthday Honours for services to association football and to broadcasting.

== Personal life ==
A lifelong Rangers fan, McCoist attended his first Old Firm fixture as a ten-year-old on 5 May 1973. It was Rangers' 3–2 Scottish Cup final victory in front of 122,714 spectators at Hampden Park.

McCoist's met his first wife, Allison, in 1981. They married in 1990 and divorced in 2004. The marriage produced three sons. He has two more sons with his second wife, Vivien. One of his children, Argyll, is a semi-professional footballer who (as of 2025) plays for Drumchapel United.

In September 1987, McCoist was convicted of assault and fined £150 at Hamilton Sheriff Court. This followed an attack on a 19-year-old outside an East Kilbride nightclub in the early hours of 5 December 1986. A verdict of not proven was returned against Rangers teammates Ted McMinn and Iain Durrant in relation to the incident. McCoist and Durrant were each fined £1,500 by Rangers. In 1996, McCoist was convicted of drink driving.

During the 2014 Scottish independence referendum, McCoist was a supporter of the Better Together campaign against Scottish independence.

McCoist had an extramarital affair with the actress Patsy Kensit which was cited in divorce proceedings from his first wife. It is said the affair developed from a pre-existing friendship when McCoist was in London filming ITV's The Premiership football highlights show.

McCoist's mother died in September 2022, aged 95. When he and his sister were clearing out her house, he discovered his first pair of football boots, from his time at Calderwood Star.

In November 2024, McCoist revealed he has Dupuytren's contracture, a genetic disorder that causes a person's fingers to bend towards their palm.

== Career statistics ==
=== Playing ===
==== Club ====
Appearances and goals by club, season and competition
Club	Season	League			National cup (Note: Includes Scottish Cup, FA Cup)		League cup (Note: Includes Scottish League Cup, Football League Cup)		Continental		Total	
Club	Season	Division	Apps	Goals	Apps	Goals	Apps	Goals	Apps	Goals	Apps	Goals
St Johnstone	1978–79	Scottish First Division	4	0	0	0	0	0	–		4	0
St Johnstone	1979–80	Scottish First Division	15	0	1	0	0	0	–		16	0
St Johnstone	1980–81	Scottish First Division	38	22	3	1	2	0	–		43	23
St Johnstone	1981–82	Scottish First Division	0	0	0	0	5	4	–		5	4
St Johnstone	Total		57	22	4	1	7	4	0	0	68	27
Sunderland	1981–82	First Division	28	2	3	0	1	0	–		32	2
Sunderland	1982–83	First Division	28	6	1	0	4	1	–		33	7
Sunderland	Total		56	8	4	0	5	1	0	0	65	9
Rangers	1983–84	Scottish Premier Division	30	8	4	3	10	9	3 (Note: Appearances in European Cup Winners' Cup)	0	47	20
Rangers	1984–85	Scottish Premier Division	25	12	3	0	6	5	4 (Note: Appearances in UEFA Cup)	1	38	18
Rangers	1985–86	Scottish Premier Division	33	25	1	1	4	1	2	0	40	27
Rangers	1986–87	Scottish Premier Division	44	34	1	0	5	2	6	2	56	38
Rangers	1987–88	Scottish Premier Division	40	31	2	1	5	6	6 (Note: Appearances in European Cup)	4	53	42
Rangers	1988–89	Scottish Premier Division	19	9	8	5	4	4	2	0	33	18
Rangers	1989–90	Scottish Premier Division	34	14	2	0	4	4	–		40	18
Rangers	1990–91	Scottish Premier Division	26	11	2	1	4	3	4	3	36	18
Rangers	1991–92	Scottish Premier Division	38	34	5	4	4	1	2	0	49	39
Rangers	1992–93	Scottish Premier Division	34	34	4	5	5	8	9 (Note: Appearances in UEFA Champions League)	2	52	49
Rangers	1993–94	Scottish Premier Division	21	7	6	3	1	1	–		28	11
Rangers	1994–95	Scottish Premier Division	9	1	0	0	0	0	–		9	1
Rangers	1995–96	Scottish Premier Division	25	16	2	1	4	3	6	0	37	20
Rangers	1996–97	Scottish Premier Division	25	10	3	1	3	3	6	6	37	20
Rangers	1997–98	Scottish Premier Division	15	5	4	4	3	4	4	3	26	16
Rangers	Total		418	251	47	29	62	54	54	21	581	355
Kilmarnock	1998–99	Scottish Premier League	26	7	1	0	2	1	–		29	8
Kilmarnock	1999–2000	Scottish Premier League	9	1	0	0	1	2	2	0	12	3
Kilmarnock	2000–01	Scottish Premier League	18	1	2	0	2	2	–		22	3
Kilmarnock	Total		53	9	3	0	5	5	2	0	63	14
Career total			584	290	58	30	79	64	56	21	777	405

==== International ====
Appearances and goals by national team and year
National team	Year	Apps	Goals
Scotland	1986	2	0
Scotland	1987	6	3
Scotland	1988	5	0
Scotland	1989	6	2
Scotland	1990	10	3
Scotland	1991	4	2
Scotland	1992	11	3
Scotland	1993	2	2
Scotland	1994	—	
Scotland	1995	3	2
Scotland	1996	7	2
Scotland	1997	3	0
Scotland	1998	2	0
Total		61	19

Scores and results list Scotland's goal tally first, score column indicates score after each McCoist goal.

List of international goals scored by Ally McCoist
No.	Date	Venue	Cap	Opponent	Score	Result	Competition
1	9 September 1987	Hampden Park, Glasgow, Scotland	7	Hungary	1–0	2–0	Friendly
2	9 September 1987	Hampden Park, Glasgow, Scotland	7	Hungary	2–0	2–0	Friendly
3	14 October 1987	Hampden Park, Glasgow, Scotland	8	Belgium	1–0	2–0	UEFA Euro 1988 qualifying
4	26 April 1989	Hampden Park, Glasgow, Scotland	15	Cyprus	2–1	2–1	1990 FIFA World Cup qualification
5	15 November 1989	Hampden Park, Glasgow, Scotland	19	Norway	1–0	1–1	1990 FIFA World Cup qualification
6	16 May 1990	Pittodrie Stadium, Aberdeen, Scotland	21	Egypt	1–2	1–3	Friendly
7	12 September 1990	Hampden Park, Glasgow, Scotland	27	Romania	2–1	2–1	UEFA Euro 1992 qualifying
8	14 November 1990	Vasil Levski National Stadium, Sofia, Bulgaria	29	Bulgaria	1–0	1–1	UEFA Euro 1992 qualifying
9	11 September 1991	Wankdorf Stadion, Bern, Switzerland	32	Switzerland	2–2	2–2	UEFA Euro 1992 qualifying
10	13 November 1991	Hampden Park, Glasgow, Scotland	33	San Marino	4–0	4–0	UEFA Euro 1992 qualifying
11	19 February 1992	Hampden Park, Glasgow, Scotland	34	Northern Ireland	1–0	1–0	Friendly
12	20 May 1992	Varsity Stadium, Toronto, Ontario, Canada	37	Canada	2–1	3–1	Friendly
13	9 September 1992	Wankdorf Stadion, Bern, Switzerland	42	Switzerland	1–1	1–3	1994 FIFA World Cup qualification
14	17 February 1993	Ibrox Stadium, Glasgow, Scotland	45	Malta	1–0	3–0	1994 FIFA World Cup qualification
15	17 February 1993	Ibrox Stadium, Glasgow, Scotland	45	Malta	2–0	3–0	1994 FIFA World Cup qualification
16	16 August 1995	Hampden Park, Glasgow, Scotland	47	Greece	1–0	1–0	UEFA Euro 1996 qualifying
17	15 November 1995	Hampden Park, Glasgow, Scotland	49	San Marino	3–0	5–0	UEFA Euro 1996 qualifying
18	27 March 1996	Hampden Park, Glasgow, Scotland	50	Australia	1–0	1–0	Friendly
19	18 June 1996	Villa Park, Birmingham, England	54	Switzerland	1–0	1–0	UEFA Euro 1996

=== Managerial record ===
As of 24 December 2014

Managerial record by team and tenure
Team	Nat	From	To	Record					Ref.
Team	Nat	From	To	G	W	D	L	Win %	Ref.
Rangers	(Scotland)	1 June 2011	21 December 2014	167	121	22	24	72.46	
Career Total				167	121	22	24	72.46	—

== Honours ==
=== Player ===
Rangers

- Scottish Premier Division (10): 1986–87, 1988–89, 1989–90, 1990–91, 1991–92, 1992–93, 1993–94, 1994–95, 1995–96, 1996–97
- Scottish Cup: 1991–92 (Note: appeared in matches during the Scottish Cups of 1992–93 and 1995–96 which Rangers won, but did not play in either final due to injury)
- Scottish League Cup (9): 1983–84, 1984–85, 1986–87, 1987–88, 1988–89, 1990–91, 1992–93, 1993–94, 1996–97

Individual

- Top scorer in European leagues: 1991–92, 1992–93
- European Cup top scorer: 1987–88
- Ballon d'Or: 1987 (21st place)
- SFWA Footballer of the Year: 1991–92
- SPFA Players' Player of the Year: 1991–92
- BBC Scotland Sports Personality of the Year: 1992
- Daily Record Golden Shot: 1991–92, 1992–93
- Scotland national football team roll of honour: 1996

=== Manager ===
Rangers

- Scottish League One: 2013–14 (third tier)
- Scottish Third Division: 2012–13 (fourth tier)

Individual

- Scottish Premier League Manager of the Month: September 2011
- Scottish League Two Manager of the Month: December 2012
- Scottish League One Manager of the Month (2): September 2013, January 2014

== See also ==
- List of footballers in Scotland by number of league appearances (500+)
- List of footballers in Scotland by number of league goals (200+)
- List of Scotland national football team captains
