= Andrew A. Bruce =

American judge

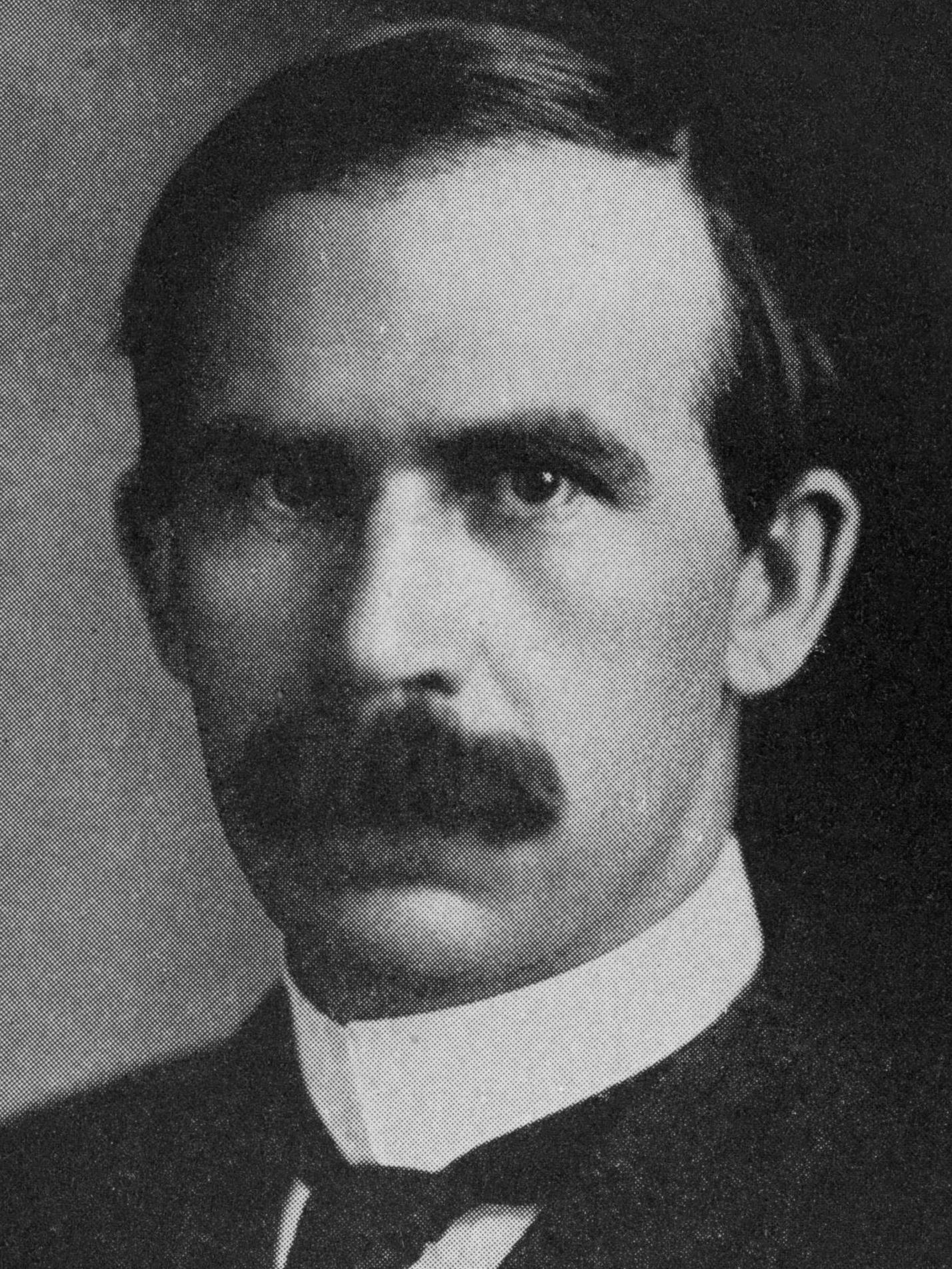

Chief Justice of North Dakota
- In office 1917–1918
- Preceded by: Charles J. Fisk
- Succeeded by: Adolph M. Christianson

Justice of the North Dakota Supreme Court
- In office 1911–1918
- Preceded by: Burleigh F. Spalding
- Succeeded by: Nels Johnson

Personal details
- Born: April 15, 1866 Madras, Madras Presidency, British India (present-day Chennai, Tamil Nadu, India)
- Died: December 6, 1934 (aged 68)
- Education: University of Wisconsin

Andrew Alexander Bruce (April 15, 1866 – December 6, 1934) was an American judge who served as a justice of the Supreme Court of North Dakota from 1911 to 1918.

== Early life and education ==
Andrew A. Bruce was born in Madras, India, on April 15, 1866, to parents of Scottish ancestry. At the time of his birth, his father Edward Archibald Bruce was a General in the British Army and was stationed in India. Bruce attended elementary school in England. In 1881, at the age of 15, Bruce was orphaned and immigrated to the United States on his own. For several years, Bruce worked as a farm laborer in Minnesota. He then later attended the University of Wisconsin, where he received his law degree in 1892.

== Career ==
After graduating, Bruce practiced law in Wisconsin and Illinois. He served on the legal staff of the Wisconsin Central Railway Company and the Illinois State Board of Factory Inspectors. While in Illinois and practicing as an attorney there, he lived in Chicago. In 1895, he became involved in the Ritchie v. People case and fought in favor of workers’ rights. Bruce became known as an avid advocate of labor laws, and he helped establish laws against sweat shops in Wisconsin and Illinois.

In 1898, he discontinued practicing law and began a career in teaching at the University of Wisconsin School of Law. In 1902, he moved to North Dakota and served as the Dean of the University of North Dakota School of Law until 1911.

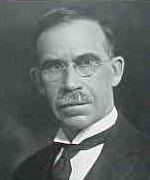
Andrew A. Bruce

In 1911, Governor John Burke appointed Bruce to fill the position on the North Dakota Supreme Court that had been vacated by the resignation of Justice David Morgan. Bruce entered the bench at the age of 45, and he was elected to a full term in 1912. Bruce served on the Supreme Court until resigning on December 1, 1918, including serving as chief justice from 1917 to 1918. His tenure as a justice lasted roughly seven years and one month. His reason for retiring was in order to reenter the teaching profession.

After resigning from the court, Bruce moved to Minnesota and taught at the University of Minnesota School of Law from 1919 to 1922. After that, he accepted a position at Northwestern University Law School where he taught until his death.

In addition to his career as an attorney, professor, and judge, Bruce wrote several books on law and was a frequent contributor to magazines, newspapers, and journals. He also served on many committees and boards, such as the President of the American Institute of Criminal Law and Criminology.

He was a supporter of racial segregation, writing a widely cited article Racial Zoning by Private Contract which advocated keeping African Americans out of neighborhoods largely populated by White people using private agreements.

Andrew A. Bruce died on December 6, 1934, at the age of 68 after succumbing to a bronchial illness.

== See also ==
- North Dakota Supreme Court
- List of justices of the North Dakota Supreme Court
- List of North Dakota Supreme Court chief justices
