= 1975–76 Scottish Second Division =

Scottish Second Division
- Season: 1975–76
- Champions: Clydebank
- Promoted: Clydebank; Alloa Athletic

The 1975–76 Scottish Second Division was won by Clydebank who, along with second placed Raith Rovers, were promoted to the First Division. Meadowbank Thistle finished bottom.

== Table ==
Pos	Team	Pld	W	D	L	GF	GA	GD	Pts	Promotion
1	Clydebank (C, P)	26	17	6	3	46	15	+31	40	Promotion to the First Division
2	Raith Rovers (P)	26	15	10	1	45	22	+23	40	Promotion to the First Division
3	Alloa Athletic	26	14	7	5	48	32	+16	35	
4	Queen's Park	26	10	9	7	41	33	+8	29	
5	Cowdenbeath	26	11	7	8	44	43	+1	29	
6	Stirling Albion	26	9	7	10	39	32	+7	25	
7	Stranraer	26	11	3	12	49	43	+6	25	
8	East Stirlingshire	26	8	8	10	33	33	0	24	
9	Albion Rovers	26	7	10	9	35	38	−3	24	
10	Stenhousemuir	26	9	5	12	39	44	−5	23	
11	Berwick Rangers	26	7	5	14	32	44	−12	19	
12	Forfar Athletic	26	4	10	12	28	48	−20	18	
13	Brechin City	26	6	5	15	30	53	−23	17	
14	Meadowbank Thistle	26	5	6	15	24	53	−29	16	

Source: "1975-1976 Second Division - SPFL Archive". SPFL.
Rules for classification: 1) points; 2) goal difference; 3) number of goals scored.
(C) Champions; (P) Promoted
