= Colin McAdam (footballer) =

Scottish footballer

Personal information
- Full name: Colin Crawford McAdam
- Date of birth: 28 August 1951
- Place of birth: Irvine, Scotland
- Date of death: 1 August 2013 (aged 61)
- Place of death: Glasgow, Scotland
- Height: 1.85 m (6 ft 1 in)
- Positions: Defender; striker

Senior career*
Years	Team	Apps	(Gls)
1969–1975	Dumbarton	70	(11)
1975–1978	Motherwell	62	(3)
1977–1980	Partick Thistle	70	(24)
1980–1984	Rangers	65	(15)
1984–1985	Adelaide City	2	(0)
1985–1986	Heart of Midlothian	6	(0)
1986–1988	Partick Thistle	23	(1)

International career
1978	Scottish Football League XI	1	(0)
- * Club domestic league appearances and goals

Colin McAdam (28 August 1951 – 1 August 2013) was a Scottish professional football player, best known for his time with Rangers. He played as both a centre back and a striker during his career.

== Football career ==
McAdam played as a youth player for Dumbarton and was later promoted to the main squad as a defender, where he began his professional career. He had spells at Motherwell and Partick Thistle. He joined Rangers for £165,000 in June 1980. He made his debut for Rangers on 9 August 1980 in a Premier Division match against Airdrieonians which finished as a 1–1 draw. Under then manager John Greig, McAdam played mainly as a striker. His first goal came in his second appearance (against Partick Thistle) and set him on the road to an end of season tally of 21. The following season proved not to be quite as successful and McAdam found himself being played in defence to cover injuries. Gradually he became more of a squad player and found himself surplus to requirements when Jock Wallace took over the reins at the club for his second spell in charge. He broke his leg in 1984 after a tackle with Dave Mitchell and after 99 first team appearances and 32 goals he left Ibrox, with his penultimate appearance being the Scottish League Cup final in March 1984.

After a two-game stint with Australian side Adelaide City he returned to Scotland to sign for Hearts in September 1985. He left Tynecastle in October 1986 having only played six times, all as a substitute. He re-joined former club Partick Thistle for two seasons, who were now under the control of former teammate Derek Johnstone. After spells in the juniors with Irvine Meadow and Maryhill, McAdam retired in 1990.

== Personal life and death ==
McAdam was married and had three children.

McAdam's younger brother Tom was also a footballer. A defender, he played for Rangers' biggest rivals Celtic at the same time Colin was at Rangers, and they played against each other in Old Firm matches eight times. They both started at Dumbarton and played there alongside each other, and both later signed for Motherwell but at different times.

McAdam died on 1 August 2013, aged 61.
