= Stuart Beattie (footballer) =

Scottish footballer

Personal information
- Full name: Stuart Richard Beattie
- Date of birth: 10 July 1967 (age 59)
- Place of birth: Stevenston, Scotland
- Height: 6 ft 2 in (1.88 m)
- Position: Defender

Senior career*
Years	Team	Apps	(Gls)
1985–1986	Rangers	5	(0)
1988–1989	Doncaster Rovers	26	(1)
- * Club domestic league appearances and goals

Stuart Richard Beattie (born 10 July 1967) is a Scottish former footballer who played as a defender.

Beattie joined Rangers from Ardeer Recreation Boys Club. He made five league appearances for the club but injuries dogged his progression. He left the club and later joined English side Doncaster Rovers making 26 league appearances and netting his first career goal before retiring in 1989.
