= Scott Fraser (footballer, born 1963) =

Scottish footballer

Personal information
- Date of birth: 24 April 1963 (age 63)
- Place of birth: Edinburgh, Scotland
- Position: Defender

Youth career
- Haddington Athletic

Senior career*
Years	Team	Apps	(Gls)
1983–1985	Rangers	9	(0)
1985	East Fife	4	(0)
1985–1986	Berwick Rangers	15	(1)
1986	Green Gully	21	(1)
1987–1988	Heidelberg United	25	(0)
1988	Fawkner Blues	19	(3)
1989–1991	Berwick Rangers	65	(3)
1991–1992	Cowdenbeath	29	(2)
- * Club domestic league appearances and goals

Scott Fraser (born 24 April 1963) is a Scottish former professional footballer, who played for Rangers, East Fife, Berwick Rangers and Cowdenbeath in the Scottish Football League. He also played in Australia for three years, representing Green Gully, Heidelberg United and Fawkner Blues.

After ending his football career in the early 1990s, Fraser became involved in property investment. He co-founded property investment business McEwan Fraser, which subsequently became a main sponsor of Hibernian, as well as McEwan Fraser Legal, an estate agency based in Edinburgh.
