= Andy Bruce =

Scottish footballer (born 1964)

Personal information
- Full name: Andrew Bruce
- Date of birth: 9 August 1964 (age 62)
- Place of birth: Edinburgh, Scotland
- Position: Goalkeeper

Senior career*
Years	Team	Apps	(Gls)
1981–1986	Rangers	2	(0)
1984	→ Partick Thistle (loan)	2	(0)
1986–1987	Heart of Midlothian	1	(0)
1987	→ Greenock Morton (loan)	1	(0)
- * Club domestic league appearances and goals

Andy Bruce (born 9 August 1964) is a Scottish former professional football player who is best known for his time with Rangers.

Bruce began his professional career with Rangers, having played previously with junior outfit Linlithgow Rose F.C. Whilst at Ibrox he made two appearances and had a loan spell at Partick Thistle. He joined Heart of Midlothian in 1986 and spent one season there, making one appearance in the league and one in the East of Scotland Shield. He also had a brief loan spell at Greenock Morton whilst at Tynecastle. He retired from professional football upon his release from Hearts in 1987.
