= Eric Ferguson (footballer) =

Scottish footballer (born 1965)

Personal information
- Full name: Eric Ferguson
- Date of birth: 12 February 1965 (age 61)
- Place of birth: Fife, Scotland
- Position: Forward

Senior career*
Years	Team	Apps	(Gls)
1983–1986	Rangers	15	(1)
1983–1984	→ Clydebank (loan)	16	(7)
1986	→ Southampton (loan)	0	(0)
1986–1988	Dunfermline	47	(10)
1987–1988	→ Clydebank (loan)	4	(0)
1988	Raith Rovers	8	(0)
1989	Cowdenbeath	10	(5)
1989–1990	Blacktown City	20	(2)
- * Club domestic league appearances and goals

Eric Ferguson (born 12 February 1965) is a Scottish former footballer who played as a striker.

Ferguson joined Rangers from Gairdoch United. He went on loan to Clydebank and Southampton, before joining Dunfermline permanently. A second loan spell with Clydebank followed, then moves to Raith Rovers and Cowdenbeath. Ferguson then transferred to Australia to play for Blacktown City in the National Soccer League.
