= Billy MacKay =

Scottish footballer

Personal information
- Full name: William MacKay
- Date of birth: 27 October 1960 (age 65)
- Place of birth: Glenrothes, Scotland
- Position: Midfielder

Senior career*
Years	Team	Apps	(Gls)
1977–1985	Rangers	24	(1)
1985–1987	Hearts	5	(0)
1986	→ Dunfermline (loan)	6	(0)
- * Club domestic league appearances and goals

Billy MacKay (born 27 October 1960 in Glenrothes) is a Scottish former professional football player who is best known for his time with Rangers.

MacKay began his career with Rangers. Whilst at Ibrox he made 37 appearances and scored four goals. He joined Hearts in 1985 and spent two seasons there making five league appearances and making the bench for the 1986 Cup Final. He also had a brief loan spell at Dunfermline Athletic whilst at Tynecastle. MacKay was forced to retire through injury in 1987.

== Honours ==
- Scottish Cup runner-up, 1986
