= Scottish Football League Premier Division =

Highest level football league competition in Scotland from 1975 to 1998

The Scottish Football League Premier Division was, from 1975 until 1998, the top division of the Scottish Football League and the entire Scottish football league system. It lay above the Scottish Football League First, Second and (from 1994) Third divisions.

== History ==
=== Background ===
The Scottish Football League (SFL) was formed in 1890, initially with 12 clubs. More clubs joined the league soon afterwards, which was split into two divisions (Division One and Division Two) in 1893. A third division was added in 1923, but this lasted only three years before it collapsed under heavy financial losses. From 1926 until the Second World War, the SFL returned to two divisions. A third division, including some reserve teams, was added in 1949. The withdrawal of the reserve teams in 1955 saw a return to two divisions, with 37 clubs split almost evenly.

Following a decline in attendances in the early 1960s the SFL management committee wrote to its member clubs in early 1965 proposing change to a three division setup, with 14 clubs in the top flight. The committee proposed to allocate clubs to each division based on attendance, rather than league position at the end of the previous season, because previous proposals had failed due to uncertainty about where clubs would finish in a given season. This proposal failed to attract enough support, as did one made the following year for a 16 club top flight.

The dominance of Celtic in the late 1960s and early 1970s led to criticism that the league had become too predictable. Most of the major clubs, including Celtic, recorded drops in attendance in the 1972–73 season. In the summer of 1974, the clubs voted in favour of a three division setup, with 10 clubs in the top tier. It was decided to name the top flight as the Premier Division because many of the clubs had bad memories of the previous incarnations of Division Three, which had included reserve teams and had not lasted. The allocation of the clubs in the new divisions was determined by their league position in the 1974–75 season.

=== Operation ===
Initially, two clubs were relegated each season from a 10 club Premier Division. It was highly unlikely that either Celtic or Rangers would ever be involved in a relegation battle, given their historic dominance. This meant that the other eight clubs were at a very high risk of relegation each season. For example, in the first season of operation (1975–76), Dundee United and Aberdeen only avoided relegation on goal difference and Dundee did go down, for the first time since the 1930s. In the 1976–77 season, Hearts were relegated for the first time in their history.

The move to a three division system also widened the gap in playing standards between the clubs. Writing in 1990, Bob Crampsey noted that of the 14 clubs in the 1975–76 Scottish Second Division, only one (Clydebank) had ever played in the Premier Division. Having narrowly avoided relegation from the Premier Division, Dundee United and Aberdeen gained most from the new setup, as they established an ascendancy over Rangers and Celtic in the early 1980s.

The high probability of relegation led to calls for a 12 club Premier Division, but there was insufficient support due to clubs either having to play each other three times or playing a 44-game schedule. The new setup did result in an increase in attendances, but the risk of relegation caused problems such as defensive playing styles, less young players developing and clubs were unable to plan for the long term. Aberdeen made those points in conjunction with a proposal to cut relegation to one club, but this did not attract enough support. A proposal by East Fife to revert to the old two division setup attracted nearly as much support as the Aberdeen plan.

A major change made in February 1981, that passed almost unnoticed at the time, was the abolition of gate sharing. This meant that clubs retained all of the revenue from their home attendances, and were able to vary the cost of admission for different opposing clubs.

=== Formation of the SPL ===
Before the start of the 1998–99 season, the clubs of the Premier Division resigned en masse to form the Scottish Premier League, following the example of English clubs who formed the FA Premier League in 1992. The Scottish Football League did not reform the Premier Division, instead leaving the league with just the First, Second and Third Divisions.

== Competition structure ==
Initially and for most of its existence, the Premier Division had 10 clubs that played each other four times, giving a total of 36 games for each club in a season. There was initially two clubs automatically relegated from the Premier Division to the First Division each season.

From the 1994–95 season, a promotion and relegation two-match playoff was held each year between the second-from bottom in the Premier Division and the runner-up in the First Division. Three points for a win was also introduced in 1994.

== Member clubs ==
The clubs listed below competed in the Scottish Premier Division.

Club	City/Town
Aberdeen	Aberdeen
Airdrieonians	Airdrie
Ayr United	Ayr
Celtic	Glasgow
Clydebank	Clydebank
Dumbarton	Dumbarton
Dundee	Dundee
Dundee United	Dundee
Dunfermline Athletic	Dunfermline
Falkirk	Falkirk
Hamilton Academical	Hamilton
Heart of Midlothian	Edinburgh
Hibernian	Edinburgh
Kilmarnock	Kilmarnock
Morton	Greenock
Motherwell	Motherwell
Partick Thistle	Glasgow
Raith Rovers	Kirkcaldy
Rangers	Glasgow
St Johnstone	Perth
St Mirren	Paisley
