= List of United States House of Representatives elections in North Dakota =

North Dakota's at-large congressional district elections determine who serves as a United States representative for North Dakota's at-large congressional district, for two year terms. The elections occur on even numbered years.

North Dakota was represented by a Democratic-NPL representative from 1980 until 2011, despite that North Dakota is a historically conservative state.

== Summary of recent elections ==
- 1992 - Byron Dorgan (D) leaves the seat to become a United States senator, Earl Pomeroy (D) defeats John Korsmo (R) to win the seat.
- 1994 - Earl Pomeroy (D) wins re-election to his second term over Republican challenger Gary Porter.
- 1996 - Earl Pomeroy (D) wins re-election to his third term over Republican challenger Kevin Cramer.
- 1998 - Earl Pomeroy (D) wins re-election to his fourth term over Republican challenger Kevin Cramer.
- 2000 - Earl Pomeroy (D) wins re-election to his fifth term over Republican challenger John Dorso.
- 2002 - Earl Pomeroy (D) wins re-election to his sixth term over Republican challenger Rick Clayburgh.
- 2004 - Earl Pomeroy (D) wins re-election to his seventh term over Republican challenger Duane Sand.
- 2006 - Earl Pomeroy (D) wins re-election to his eighth term over Republican challenger Matthew Mechtel.
- 2008 - Earl Pomeroy (D) wins re-election to his ninth term over Republican challenger Duane Sand.
- 2010 - Rick Berg (R) defeats incumbent Earl Pomeroy (D).
- 2012 - Rick Berg (R) leaves the seat to run for U.S. Senate, Kevin Cramer (R) defeats Pam Gulleson (D) to win the seat.
- 2014 - Kevin Cramer (R) wins re-election to his second term over Democratic-NPL challenger George B. Sinner.
- 2016 - Kevin Cramer (R) wins re-election to his third term over Democratic-NPL challenger Chase Iron Eyes.
- 2018 - Kevin Cramer (R) leaves the seat to run for U.S. Senate, Kelly Armstrong (R) defeats Mac Schneider (D) to win the seat.
- 2020 - Kelly Armstrong (R) wins re-election to his second term over Democratic-NPL challenger Zach Raknerud.
