= List of politicians affiliated with the Tea Party movement =

The following American politicians were affiliated with the Tea Party movement, which was generally considered to be conservative, libertarian-leaning, and populist. The Tea Party movement advocated for reducing the U.S. national debt and federal budget deficit by reducing federal government spending and taxes. It was not a single, formal political party, but rather represented by activist groups such as the Tea Party Patriots and the Tea Party Express. The Tea Party Caucus was the main coalition of Tea Party-affiliated representatives and senators in Congress and was described as having a voting record resembling that of a third party. The Liberty Caucus and Freedom Caucus are closely associated with the Tea Party movement and many members of the Tea Party Caucus shifted to them following its dissolution around 2016. Tea Party members were almost entirely from the Republican party although attracted support from the Libertarian party as well; the following list of politicians were members of the Republican Party while in office unless otherwise noted.

== Alabama ==
- Robert Aderholt, representative from Alabama's 4th congressional district (1997–present) and a member of the Tea Party Caucus.
- Mo Brooks, representative from Alabama's 5th congressional district (2011–2023) and a member of the Freedom Caucus.
- Bradley Byrne, representative from Alabama's 1st congressional district (2014–2021) and a member of the Republican Study Committee. Was endorsed by Alabama Patriots, a Tea Party-affiliated organization, in his 2013 special election to the House.
- Roy Moore, Circuit Judge for the Sixteenth Circuit Court of Alabama and 27th and 31st Chief Justice of the Supreme Court of Alabama.
- Martha Roby, representative from Alabama's 2nd congressional district (2011–2021) and a member of the Tea Party Caucus.

== Alaska ==
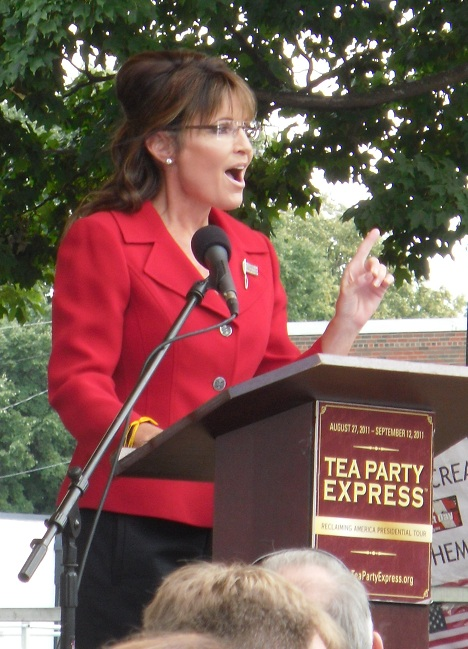
Sarah Palin at a rally sponsored by the Tea Party Express

- Sarah Palin, former Governor of Alaska (2006–2009), nominee for Vice President of the United States in the 2008 election, and prominent speaker and leader of the Tea Party.

== Arizona ==
- Joe Arpaio, former Maricopa County Sheriff (1993–2017).
- Kelly Townsend, member of the Arizona Senate from the 16th district (2013–2021) and founder of Greater Phoenix Tea Party Patriots, with 18 subgroups around the greater Phoenix area.
- Debbie Lesko, member of the Arizona House of Representatives (2009–2015) and Arizona Senate (2015–2018) and a member of the Tea Party. Later served as representative from Arizona's 8th congressional district (2018–2025).
- Martha McSally, representative for Arizona's 2nd congressional district (2015–2018) and later as a senator from Arizona (2019–2020).
- David Schweikert, Chair of the Joint Economic Committee (2025-present), representative for Arizona's 5th, 6th, and 1st districts at various points (2011–present) and formerly a member of the Freedom Caucus.
- Jeff Flake, representative from Arizona's 1st congressional district (2001–2013) and senator from Arizona from (2013–2019). Was a member of the Liberty Caucus and Republican Study Committee.

== Arkansas ==
- Rick Crawford, Chair of the House Intelligence Committee (2025-present), representative for Arkansas's 1st congressional district (2011–present) and a member of the Tea Party Patriots.
- French Hill, Chair of the House Financial Services Committee (2025-present), representative for Arkansas's 2nd congressional district (2015–present) and a member of Tea Party Patriots.
- Mike Huckabee, 44th Governor of Arkansas (1996-2007) and candidate for president in 2008 and 2016.
- Steve Womack, representative for Arkansas's 3rd congressional district (2011–present) and a member of Tea Party Patriots.
- Bruce Westerman, member of the Arkansas House of Representatives (2011–2015), representative for Arkansas's 4th congressional district (2015–present), and a member of Tea Party Patriots.

== California ==
- Jeff Denham, representative for California's 19th and 10th congressional districts (2011–2015).
- Steve Knight, member of the California State Assembly (2008–2012), member of the California State Senate (2012–2015), representative from California's 25th congressional district (2015–2019), and a member of Tea Party Patriots.
- Doug LaMalfa, representative from California's 1st congressional district (2013–2026).
- Tom McClintock, representative from California's 4th and 5th congressional districts (2009–present) and a member of the Tea Party Caucus.
- Gary Miller, representative from California's 41st and 42nd congressional districts (1999–2015) and a member of the Tea Party Caucus.
- Ed Royce, representative from California's 39th and 40th congressional districts (1993–2019) and a member of the Tea Party Caucus.
- David Valadao, representative from California's 21st and 22nd congressional districts (2013–2019, 2021–present) and a member of Tea Party Patriots.

== Colorado ==
- Mike Coffman, representative from Colorado's 6th congressional district (2009–2019), Mayor of Aurora, Colorado (2019–present) and a member of the Tea Party Caucus and endorsed by FreedomWorks in 2012.
- Doug Lamborn, representative from Colorado's 5th congressional district (2007–2025) and a member of the Tea Party Caucus.
- John Suthers, Mayor of Colorado Springs, Colorado (2015–2023).
- Ken Buck, representative from Colorado's 4th congressional district (2015–2024).

== Florida ==
- Sandy Adams, representative from Florida's 24th congressional district (2011–2013) and a member of the Tea Party Caucus, receiving the endorsement of the Central Florida Tea Party in 2012.
- Gus Bilirakis, representative from Florida's 9th and 12th congressional districts (2007–present) and a member of the Tea Party Caucus.
- Curt Clawson, Republican U.S. representative from Florida's 19th congressional district (2014–2017). Clawson delivered the Tea Party response to President Obama's State of the Union Address in 2015.
- Ander Crenshaw, representative from Florida's 4th congressional district (2001–2017) and a member of the Tea Party Caucus.
- Matt Gaetz, representative from Florida's 1st congressional district (2017–2024) and a member of the Tea Party.
- Rich Nugent, representative from Florida's 5th and 11th congressional districts (2011–2017) and a member of the Tea Party Caucus.
- Dennis Ross, representative from Florida's 12th and 15th congressional districts (2011–2019) and a member of the Tea Party Caucus.
- Cliff Stearns, representative from Florida's 6th congressional district (1989–2013) and a member of the Tea Party Caucus.
- Allen West, representative from Florida's 22nd congressional district (2011–2013) and a member of the Tea Party Caucus, receiving the endorsement of FreedomWorks in 2012.
- Dan Webster, representative from Florida's 11th congressional district (2011–present).
- Ted Yoho, representative from Florida's 3rd congressional district (2013–2021).

== Georgia ==
- Paul Broun, representative from Georgia's 10th congressional district (2007–2015) and a member of the Tea Party Caucus.
- Herman Cain, presidential candidate in 2012. Cain gave the Tea Party response to President Barack Obama's 2012 State of the Union Address.
- Phil Gingrey, representative from Georgia's 11th congressional district (2003–2015) and a member of the Tea Party Caucus.
- Newt Gingrich, 50th Speaker of the United States House of Representatives (1995-1999) and candidate for president in 2012.
- Tom Price, representative from Georgia's 6th congressional district (2005–2017) and a member of the Tea Party Caucus.
- Lynn Westmoreland, representative from Georgia's 8th and 3rd congressional districts (2005–2017) and a member of the Tea Party Caucus.

== Illinois ==
- Joe Walsh, representative from Illinois's 8th congressional district (2011–2013) and a member of the Tea Party Caucus, receiving the endorsement of FreedomWorks in 2012.
- Adam Kinzinger, representative from Illinois's 16th congressional district (2011–2023).
- Charlie Kirk, American conservative political activist and founder of Turning Point USA.

== Indiana ==
- Dan Burton, representative from Indiana's 6th (1983–2003) and 5th (2003–2013) congressional districts and a member of the Tea Party Caucus.
- Mike Pence, 48th vice president of the United States (2017–2021), governor of Indiana (2013–2017), representative from Indiana's 2nd and 6th congressional districts (2001–2013) and a member of the Tea Party Caucus.

== Iowa ==
- Steve King, representative from Iowa's 5th and 4th congressional district (2003–2021) and a founding member of the Tea Party Caucus, receiving the endorsement of FreedomWorks in 2012.

== Kansas ==
- Tim Huelskamp, representative from Kansas's 1st congressional district (2011–2017) and a member of the Tea Party Caucus.
- Lynn Jenkins, representative from Kansas's 2nd congressional district (2009–2019) and a member of the Tea Party Caucus.
- Jerry Moran, Senator from Kansas (2011–present) and a member of the Tea Party Caucus.

== Kentucky ==
- Rand Paul, Senator from Kentucky (2011–present) and an inaugural member of the Senate Tea Party Caucus. Paul gave the Tea Party response to President Barack Obama's 2013 State of the Union Address.
- Thomas Massie, representative from Kentucky's 4th congressional district (2012–present) and was endorsed by FreedomWorks in 2012.
- Matt Bevin, Governor of Kentucky (2015–2019) and candidate in the 2014 United States Senate election in Kentucky.
- Jenean Hampton, Lieutenant Governor of Kentucky (2015-2019), 2014 state house candidate, and former chairwoman of the Bowling Green/Southern Kentucky Tea Party.

== Louisiana ==
- Rodney Alexander, representative from Louisiana's 5th congressional district (2003–2013) and a member of the Tea Party Caucus. Was a member of the Democratic Party until 2004.
- Bill Cassidy, Senator from Louisiana (2015–present), representative from Louisiana's 6th congressional district (2009–2015), and a member of the Tea Party Caucus.
- John Fleming, representative from Louisiana's 4th congressional district (2009–2017) and a member of the Tea Party Caucus.
- Jeff Landry, Governor of Louisiana (2024–present), Attorney General of Louisiana (2016–2024), representative from Louisiana's 3rd congressional district (2011–2013) and a member of the Tea Party Caucus.
- Steve Scalise, representative from Louisiana's 1st congressional district (2008–present) and a member of the Tea Party Caucus.
- David Vitter, Senator from Louisiana (2005–2017).

== Maryland ==
- Roscoe Bartlett, representative from Maryland's 6th congressional district (1993–2013) and a member of the Tea Party Caucus.

== Michigan ==
- Justin Amash, representative from Michigan's 3rd congressional district (2011–2021) as a Republican until switching to the Libertarian Party in 2020. In May 2012, Susan Davis of USA Today described Amash as "Tea Party-aligned".
- Todd Courser, member of the state house.
- Cindy Gamrat, member of the state house.
- Pete Hoekstra, representative from Michigan's 2nd congressional district (1993–2011) and a member of the Tea Party Caucus.
- Tim Walberg, representative from Michigan's 7th and 5th congressional districts (2007–2009, 2011–present) and a member of the Tea Party Caucus.

== Minnesota ==
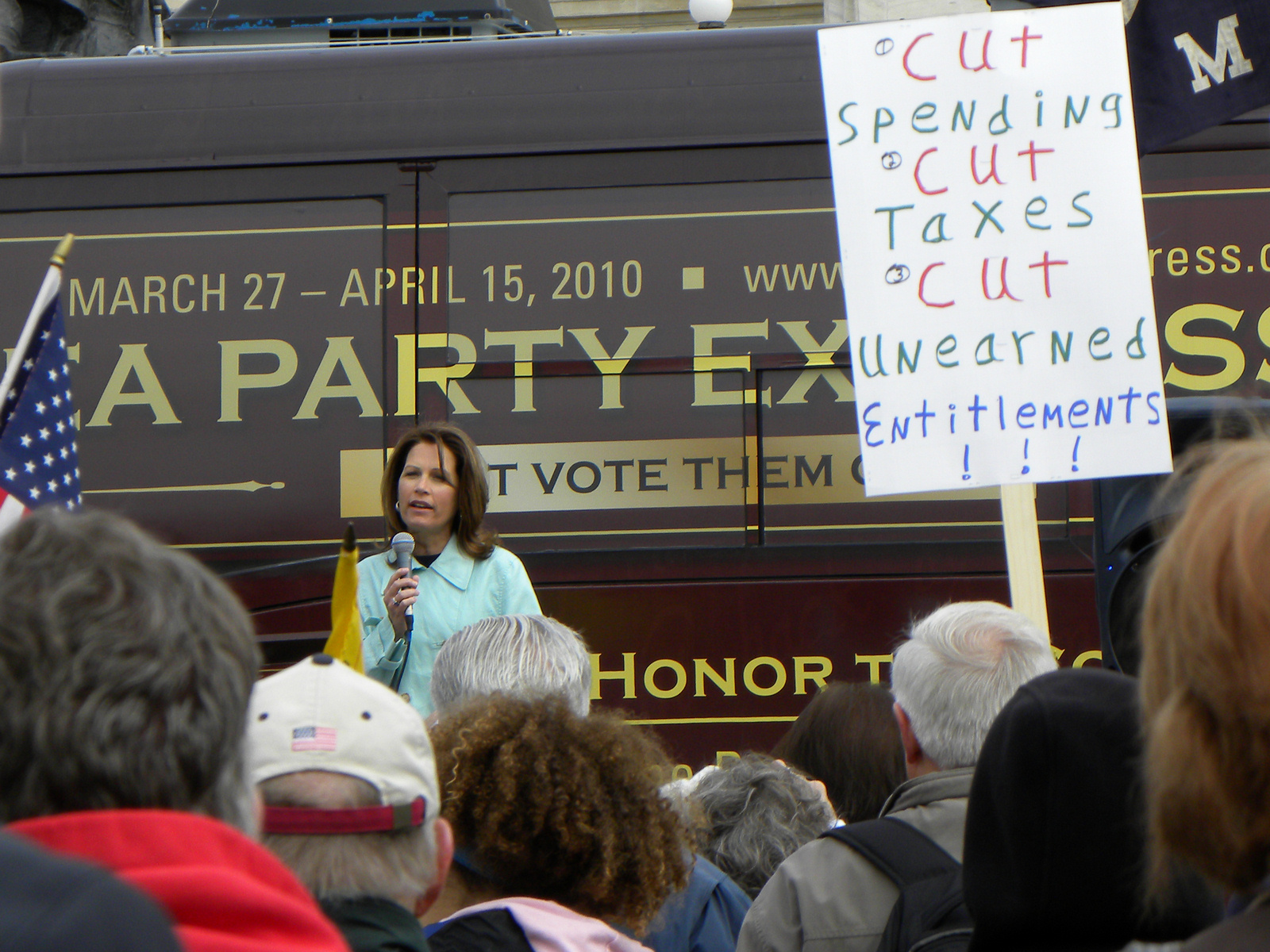
Michele Bachmann at a Tea Party rally

- Michele Bachmann, representative from Minnesota's 6th congressional district (2007–2015) and founder of the Tea Party Caucus.

== Mississippi ==
- Steven Palazzo, representative from Mississippi's 4th congressional district (2011–2023) and a member of the Tea Party Caucus. In September 2011, George Altman of gulflive.com described Palazzo as a tea party darling".
- Chris McDaniel, member of the State Senate (2008–2024).

== Missouri ==
- Vicky Hartzler, representative from Missouri's 4th congressional district (2011–2023) and a member of the Tea Party Caucus.
- Blaine Luetkemeyer, representative from Missouri's 9th and 3rd congressional districts (2009–2025) and a member of the Tea Party Caucus.

== Montana ==
- Denny Rehberg, representative from Montana's At-large congressional district (2001–2013) and a member of the Tea Party Caucus.
- Derek Skees, member of the state house (2011–2013). In October 2010, Skees said he "was in the Tea Party before it was cool".

== Nebraska ==
- Adrian Smith, member of the Nebraska Legislature (1999–2007), representative from Nebraska's 3rd congressional district (2007–present), and a member of the Tea Party Caucus.
- Bill Montgomery, American businessman, conservative activist, and co-founder of Turning Point USA.

== North Carolina ==
- Howard Coble, representative from North Carolina's 6th congressional district (1985–2015) and a member of the Tea Party Caucus.
- Sue Myrick, representative from North Carolina's 9th congressional district (1995–2013) and a member of the Tea Party Caucus.

== North Dakota ==
- Gary Emineth, chair of the North Dakota Republican Party (2007–2010) and a founding member of the North Dakota Tea Party Caucus.
- Duane Sand, ran in U.S. House elections in 2004 and 2008 and in U.S. Senate elections in 2000 and 2012. Sand was a founding member of the North Dakota Tea Party Caucus.

== South Carolina ==
- Jim DeMint, Senator from South Carolina (2005–2013) and a founding member of the Tea Party Caucus. In January 2012, Jim Davenport of The Huffington Post described DeMint as "a dean of the influential and well-funded tea party movement".
- Jeff Duncan, representative from South Carolina's 3rd congressional district (2011–2025) and a member of the Tea Party Caucus.
- Mick Mulvaney, representative from South Carolina's 5th congressional district (2011–2017) and a member of the Tea Party Caucus. In his 2010 election Mulvaney received the backing of the tea party.
- Mark Sanford, governor of South Carolina (2003–2011) and representative from South Carolina's 1st congressional district (2013–2019). Sanford has described himself as "Tea Party before the Tea Party was cool".
- Tim Scott, representative from South Carolina's 1st congressional district (2011–2012), Senator from South Carolina (2012–present), candidate for President in 2024, and a member of the Tea Party Caucus.
- Joe Wilson, representative from South Carolina's 2nd congressional district (2001–present) and a member of the Tea Party Caucus. In November 2009 Wilson spoke at tea party events at Ford Mansion in Morristown, New Jersey and at Capitol Hill.

== South Dakota ==
- Gordon Howie, member of the South Dakota House of Representatives (2005–2009) and South Dakota Senate (2009–2011).

== Tennessee ==
- Diane Black, representative from Tennessee's 6th congressional district (2011–2019) and a member of the Tea Party Caucus.
- Marsha Blackburn, senator from Tennessee (2019–present) and representative from Tennessee's 7th congressional district (2003–2019).
- Joe Carr, member of the State House (2009–2015). Carr was endorsed by Tea Party Nation, among other Tea Party endorsements, in his unsuccessful campaign for U.S. Senate in 2014.
- Stephen Fincher, representative from Tennessee's 8th congressional district (2011–2017) and a member of the Tea Party Caucus.
- Phil Roe, representative from Tennessee's 1st congressional district (2009–2021) and a member of the Tea Party Caucus.

== Texas ==
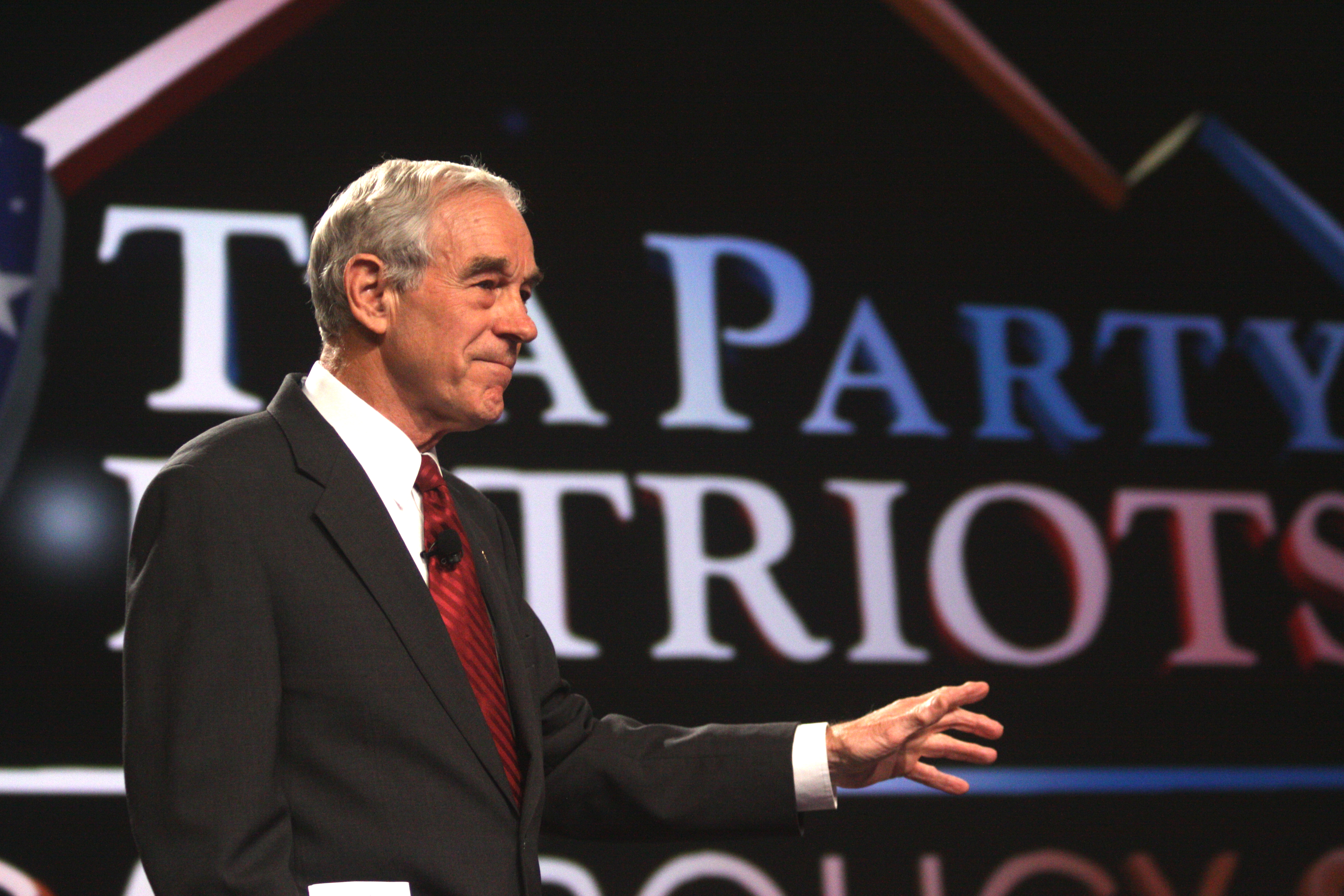
Ron Paul addressing the Tea Party Patriots

- Michael Burgess, representative from Texas's 26th congressional district (2003–2025) and a member of the Tea Party Caucus.
- John Carter, representative from Texas's 31st congressional district (2003–present), secretary of the House Republican Conference, and a member of the Tea Party Caucus.
- John Culberson, representative from Texas's 7th congressional district (2001–2019) and a member of the Tea Party Caucus.
- Ted Cruz, senator from Texas (2013–present) and candidate for president in 2016. Michelle Cottle of The Daily Beast called Cruz "the delight of the Tea Party anti-establishment conservatives"
- David Dewhurst, Lieutenant Governor of Texas (2003–2015). In April 2012 Gary Scharrer of the Houston Chronicle wrote that Dewhurst "emphasizes that he embraced the core principles of the Tea Party, before that movement gained momentum".
- Blake Farenthold, representative from Texas's 27th congressional district (2011–2018) and a member of the Tea Party Caucus.
- Louie Gohmert, representative from Texas's 1st congressional district (2005–2023) and a member of the Tea Party Caucus.
- Ralph Hall, representative from Texas's 4th congressional district (1981–2015) and a member of the Tea Party Caucus.
- Jim Landtroop, member of the State House from District 85 in the early 2010s.
- Kenny Marchant, representative from Texas's 24th congressional district (2005–2021) and a member of the Tea Party Caucus.
- Randy Neugebauer, representative from Texas's 19th congressional district (2003–2017) and a member of the Tea Party Caucus.
- Dan Patrick, member of the State Senate (2007–2015) and Lieutenant Governor of Texas (2015–present). As state senator, Patrick created a Tea Party Caucus in the Texas legislature in late 2010.
- Ron Paul, representative from Texas's 22nd and 14th congressional districts (1976–1977, 1979–1985, 1997–2013) and a presidential candidate in 1988, 2008, and 2012. In November 2010, Joshua Green of The Atlantic described Paul as the tea party's "intellectual godfather".
- Ken Paxton, Texas Attorney General (2015–present), state senator (2013–2015), and state representative (2003–2013).
- Ted Poe, representative from Texas's 2nd congressional district (2005–2019) and a member of the Tea Party Caucus.
- Pete Sessions, representative from Texas's 5th, 32nd, and 17th congressional districts (1997–2019, 2021–present), chair of the National Republican Congressional Committee (2010), and a member of the Tea Party Caucus.
- Lamar Smith, representative from Texas's 21st congressional district (1987–2019) and a member of the Tea Party Caucus.

== Utah ==
- Rob Bishop, representative from Utah's 1st congressional district (2003–2021) and a member of the Tea Party Caucus. Bishop has appeared at Tea Party rallies in Utah.
- Mike Lee, senator from Utah (2011–present) and a member of the Tea Party Caucus.

== Virginia ==
- Ken Cuccinelli, Attorney General of Virginia (2010–2014) and nominee for Governor of Virginia in 2013.

== Washington ==
- Jaime Herrera Beutler, representative from Washington’s 3rd congressional district (2011–2023).

== West Virginia ==
- David McKinley, representative from West Virginia's 1st congressional district (2011–2023) and a member of the Tea Party Caucus.

== Wisconsin ==
- Ron Johnson, senator from Wisconsin (2011–present). Johnson has said he "did kind of spring out of the Tea Party" and is happy to be associated with the movement.

== Wyoming ==
- Cynthia Lummis, representative from Wyoming's At-large congressional district (2009–2017), senator from Wyoming (2021–present), and a founding member of the Tea Party Caucus.
