= North Dakota's at-large congressional district =

At-large U.S. House district for North Dakota

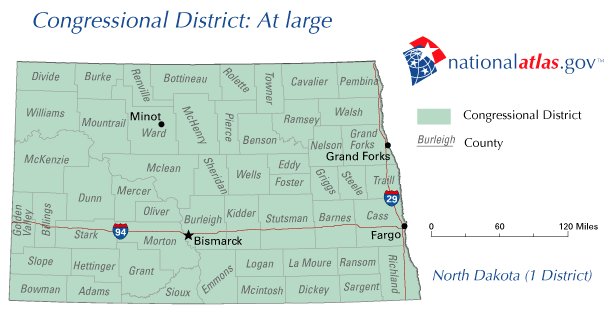
- Representative: Julie Fedorchak; R–Mandan
- Area: 68,976 mi^{2} (178,650 km^{2})
- Distribution: 55.8% urban; 44.2% rural
- Population (2025): 799,358
- Median household income: $81,545
- Ethnicity: 81.7% White; 4.8% Native American; 4.3% Hispanic; 3.9% Two or more races; 3.4% Black; 1.7% Asian; 0.3% other
- Cook PVI: R+18

North Dakota's at-large congressional district is the sole congressional district for the state of North Dakota. Based on size, it is the eighth largest congressional district in the nation.

The district was represented by Kelly Armstrong who served in Congress until December 2024 when he resigned to take office as Governor of North Dakota. The district is currently represented by Republican Julie Fedorchak.

== History ==
The district was first created when North Dakota achieved statehood on November 2, 1889, electing a single member. Following the 1900 United States census the state was allocated two seats, both of whom were elected from an at large district. Following the 1910 United States census a third seat was gained, with the legislature drawing three separate districts. The third district was eliminated after the 1930 United States census. After the third seat was lost, North Dakota returned to electing two members at-large (statewide).

Following the 1960 United States census two separate districts were created. In 1970, the second district was eliminated following the 1970 United States census and a single at-large district was created. Since 1972, North Dakota has retained a single congressional district.

== List of members representing the district ==
=== 1889–1913: one seat, then two ===
From 1889 to 1903, there was one seat, elected at-large statewide. In 1903 a second at-large seat was added, lasting until 1913.

Dates	Cong ress	Member at-large			Member at-large		
Dates	Cong ress	Member	Party	Electoral history	Member	Party	Electoral history
March 4, 1889 – November 1, 1889	51st	First member seated on November 2, 1889			Second seat added in 1903		
November 2, 1889 – March 3, 1891	51st	Henry C. Hansbrough (Devils Lake)	Republican	Elected in 1889. Lost renomination.	Second seat added in 1903		
March 4, 1891 – March 3, 1899	52nd 53rd 54th 55th	Martin N. Johnson (Petersburg)	Republican	Elected in 1890. Re-elected in 1892. Re-elected in 1894. Re-elected in 1896. Retired to run for U.S. Senator.	Second seat added in 1903		
March 4, 1899 – March 3, 1901	56th	Burleigh F. Spalding (Fargo)	Republican	Elected in 1898. Retired.	Second seat added in 1903		
March 4, 1901 – March 3, 1903	57th	Thomas F. Marshall (Oakes)	Republican	Elected in 1900. Re-elected in 1902. Re-elected in 1904. Re-elected in 1906. Retired to run for U.S. Senator.	Second seat added in 1903		
March 4, 1903 – March 3, 1905	58th	Thomas F. Marshall (Oakes)	Republican	Elected in 1900. Re-elected in 1902. Re-elected in 1904. Re-elected in 1906. Retired to run for U.S. Senator.	Burleigh F. Spalding (Fargo)	Republican	Elected in 1902. Lost renomination.
March 4, 1905 – March 3, 1909	59th 60th	Thomas F. Marshall (Oakes)	Republican	Elected in 1900. Re-elected in 1902. Re-elected in 1904. Re-elected in 1906. Retired to run for U.S. Senator.	Asle Gronna (Lakota)	Republican	Elected in 1904. Re-elected in 1906. Re-elected in 1908. Resigned after elected U.S. Senator.
March 4, 1909 – February 11, 1911	61st	Louis B. Hanna (Fargo)	Republican	Elected in 1908. Re-elected in 1910. Resigned when elected Governor of North Dakota.	Asle Gronna (Lakota)	Republican	Elected in 1904. Re-elected in 1906. Re-elected in 1908. Resigned after elected U.S. Senator.
February 11, 1911 – March 3, 1911	61st	Louis B. Hanna (Fargo)	Republican	Elected in 1908. Re-elected in 1910. Resigned when elected Governor of North Dakota.	Vacant		
March 4, 1911 – January 7, 1913	62nd	Louis B. Hanna (Fargo)	Republican	Elected in 1908. Re-elected in 1910. Resigned when elected Governor of North Dakota.	Henry T. Helgesen (Milton)	Republican	Elected in 1910. Redistricted to the 1st district.
January 7, 1913 – March 3, 1913	62nd	Vacant			Henry T. Helgesen (Milton)	Republican	Elected in 1910. Redistricted to the 1st district.

=== 1913–1933: districts only ===
After the 1910 census, three seats were apportioned among districts: the 1st district, 2nd district, and 3rd district.

=== 1933–1963: two seats ===
In 1933, following the 1930 census, the delegation was reduced to two seats and the districts were eliminated in favor of a pair of at-large districts, lasting until 1963.

Dates	Cong ress	Member at-large			Member at-large		
Dates	Cong ress	Member	Party	Electoral history	Member	Party	Electoral history
March 4, 1933 – January 3, 1935	73rd	James H. Sinclair (Kenmare)	Republican	Redistricted from the 3rd district and re-elected in 1932. Lost renomination.	William Lemke (Fargo)	Republican-NPL	Elected in 1932. Re-elected in 1934. Re-elected in 1936. Re-elected in 1938. Retired to run for U.S. Senator.
January 3, 1935 – January 3, 1941	74th 75th 76th	Usher L. Burdick (Williston)	Republican-NPL	Elected in 1934. Re-elected in 1936. Re-elected in 1938. Re-elected in 1940. Re-elected in 1942; Retired to run for U.S. Senator.	William Lemke (Fargo)	Republican-NPL	Elected in 1932. Re-elected in 1934. Re-elected in 1936. Re-elected in 1938. Retired to run for U.S. Senator.
January 3, 1941 – January 3, 1943	77th	Usher L. Burdick (Williston)	Republican-NPL	Elected in 1934. Re-elected in 1936. Re-elected in 1938. Re-elected in 1940. Re-elected in 1942; Retired to run for U.S. Senator.	Charles R. Robertson (Bismarck)	Republican	Elected in 1940. Lost renomination.
January 3, 1943 – January 3, 1945	78th	Usher L. Burdick (Williston)	Republican-NPL	Elected in 1934. Re-elected in 1936. Re-elected in 1938. Re-elected in 1940. Re-elected in 1942; Retired to run for U.S. Senator.	William Lemke (Fargo)	Republican-NPL	Elected in 1942. Re-elected in 1944. Re-elected in 1946. Re-elected in 1948. Died.
January 3, 1945 – January 3, 1949	79th 80th	Charles R. Robertson (Bismarck)	Republican	Elected in 1944. Re-elected in 1946. Lost renomination.	William Lemke (Fargo)	Republican-NPL	Elected in 1942. Re-elected in 1944. Re-elected in 1946. Re-elected in 1948. Died.
January 3, 1949 – May 30, 1950	81st	Usher L. Burdick (Williston)	Republican-NPL	Elected in 1948. Re-elected in 1950. Re-elected in 1952. Re-elected in 1954. Re-elected in 1956. Retired.	William Lemke (Fargo)	Republican-NPL	Elected in 1942. Re-elected in 1944. Re-elected in 1946. Re-elected in 1948. Died.
May 31, 1950 – January 3, 1951	81st	Usher L. Burdick (Williston)	Republican-NPL	Elected in 1948. Re-elected in 1950. Re-elected in 1952. Re-elected in 1954. Re-elected in 1956. Retired.	Vacant		
January 3, 1951 – January 3, 1953	82nd	Usher L. Burdick (Williston)	Republican-NPL	Elected in 1948. Re-elected in 1950. Re-elected in 1952. Re-elected in 1954. Re-elected in 1956. Retired.	Fred G. Aandahl (Litchville)	Republican	Elected in 1950. Retired to run for U.S. Senator.
January 3, 1953 – January 3, 1959	83rd 84th 85th	Usher L. Burdick (Williston)	Republican-NPL	Elected in 1948. Re-elected in 1950. Re-elected in 1952. Re-elected in 1954. Re-elected in 1956. Retired.	Otto Krueger (Fessenden)	Republican	Elected in 1952. Re-elected in 1954. Re-elected in 1956. Retired.
January 3, 1959 – August 8, 1960	86th	Quentin Burdick (Fargo)	Democratic–NPL	Elected in 1958. Resigned when elected U.S. Senator.	Don L. Short (Medora)	Republican	Elected in 1958. Re-elected in 1960. Redistricted to the 2nd district.
August 9, 1960 – January 3, 1961	86th	Vacant			Don L. Short (Medora)	Republican	Elected in 1958. Re-elected in 1960. Redistricted to the 2nd district.
January 3, 1961 – January 3, 1963	87th	Hjalmar Nygaard (Enderlin)	Republican	Elected in 1960. Redistricted to the 1st district.	Don L. Short (Medora)	Republican	Elected in 1958. Re-elected in 1960. Redistricted to the 2nd district.

=== 1963–1973: districts again ===
In 1963, following the 1960 census, the delegation was again split between geographic districts, the 1st district and 2nd district.

=== 1973–present: one seat ===
In 1973, following the 1970 census, the delegation was reduced to one seat, represented statewide by an at-large district.

Member	Party	Years	Cong ress	Electoral history
Mark Andrews (Mapleton)	Republican	January 3, 1973 – January 3, 1981	93rd 94th 95th 96th	Redistricted from the 1st district and re-elected in 1972. Re-elected in 1974. Re-elected in 1976. Re-elected in 1978. Retired to run for U.S. Senator.
Byron Dorgan (Bismarck)	Democratic–NPL	January 3, 1981 – December 14, 1992	97th 98th 99th 100th 101st 102nd	Elected in 1980. Re-elected in 1982. Re-elected in 1984. Re-elected in 1986. Re-elected in 1988. Re-elected in 1990. Retired to run for U.S. Senator, and resigned when appointed.
Vacant		December 15, 1992 – January 3, 1993	102nd	
Earl Pomeroy (Valley City)	Democratic–NPL	January 3, 1993 – January 3, 2011	103rd 104th 105th 106th 107th 108th 109th 110th 111th	Elected in 1992. Re-elected in 1994. Re-elected in 1996. Re-elected in 1998. Re-elected in 2000. Re-elected in 2002. Re-elected in 2004. Re-elected in 2006. Re-elected in 2008. Lost re-election.
Rick Berg (Fargo)	Republican	January 3, 2011 – January 3, 2013	112th	Elected in 2010. Retired to run for U.S. Senator.
Kevin Cramer (Bismarck)	Republican	January 3, 2013 – January 3, 2019	113th 114th 115th	Elected in 2012. Re-elected in 2014. Re-elected in 2016. Retired to run for U.S. Senator.
Kelly Armstrong (Dickinson)	Republican	January 3, 2019 – December 14, 2024	116th 117th 118th	Elected in 2018. Re-elected in 2020. Re-elected in 2022. Resigned after being elected governor of North Dakota.
Vacant		December 15, 2024 – January 3, 2025	118th	
Julie Fedorchak (Mandan)	Republican	January 3, 2025 – present	119th	Elected in 2024. Re-elected in 2026.

== Recent statewide results ==
Year	Results	Party
2000	George W. Bush 61% – Al Gore 33%	Republican
2004	George W. Bush 63% – John Kerry 35%	Republican
2008	John McCain 53% – Barack Obama 45%	Republican
2012	Mitt Romney 58% – Barack Obama 39%	Republican
2016	Donald Trump 63% – Hillary Clinton 27%	Republican
2020	Donald Trump 65% – Joe Biden 32%	Republican
2024	Donald Trump 67% – Kamala Harris 31%	Republican

== Electoral history ==
Year (& Congress)	Candidate	Party	Votes	%
October 1, 1889 (51st Congress)	✓ Henry C. Hansbrough	Republican	26,077	68.4%
October 1, 1889 (51st Congress)	D. W. Maratta	Democratic	12,066	31.6%
1890 (52nd Congress)	✓ Martin N. Johnson	Republican	21,365	59.0%
1890 (52nd Congress)	John D. Benton	Democratic	14,830	41.0%
1892 (53rd Congress)	✓ Martin N. Johnson	Republican	17,695	48.9%
1892 (53rd Congress)	James F. O'Brien	Democratic	11,021	30.5%
1892 (53rd Congress)	Hans A. Foss	Independent	7,434	20.6%
1894 (54th Congress)	✓ Martin N. Johnson	Republican	21,615	55.4%
1894 (54th Congress)	Walter Muir	Populist	15,660	40.2%
1894 (54th Congress)	Budd Reeve	Independent	1,283	3.3%
1894 (54th Congress)	Lathrop S. Ellis	Prohibition	439	1.1%
1896 (55th Congress)	✓ Martin N. Johnson	Republican	25,233	54.0%
1896 (55th Congress)	John Burke	Fusion	21,172	45.3%
1896 (55th Congress)	A. V. Garver	Prohibition	349	0.7%
1898 (56th Congress)	✓ Burleigh F. Spalding	Republican	27,766	60.9%
1898 (56th Congress)	H. M. Creel	Fusion	17,844	39.1%
1900 (57th Congress)	✓ Thomas F. Marshall	Republican	34,887	61.0%
1900 (57th Congress)	M. A. Hildreth	Democratic	21,175	37.0%
1900 (57th Congress)	Charles H. Mott	Prohibition	585	1.0%
1900 (57th Congress)	J. C. Charest	Social Democratic	412	0.7%
1900 (57th Congress)	Martin S. Blair	Populist	122	0.2%
1902 (58th Congress)	✓ Thomas F. Marshall	Republican	32,986	67.6%
1902 (58th Congress)	✓ Burleigh F. Spalding	Republican	32,854	67.6%
1902 (58th Congress)	Lars A. Ueland	Democratic	14,765	29.9%
1902 (58th Congress)	Verner E. Lovell	Democratic	14,392	29.9%
1902 (58th Congress)	Royal F. King	Socialist	1,195	2.5%
1904 (59th Congress)	✓ Thomas F. Marshall	Republican	49,111	72.7%
1904 (59th Congress)	✓ Asle J. Gronna	Republican	47,648	72.7%
1904 (59th Congress)	N. P. Rasmussen	Democratic	15,622	23.3%
1904 (59th Congress)	A. G. Burr	Democratic	15,398	23.3%
1904 (59th Congress)	L. F. Dow	Socialist	1,734	2.6%
1904 (59th Congress)	E. D. Herring	Socialist	1,697	2.6%
1904 (59th Congress)	B. H. Tibbets	Prohibition	971	1.5%
1904 (59th Congress)	N. A. Colby	Prohibition	967%	1.5%
1906 (60th Congress)	✓ Thomas F. Marshall	Republican	38,923	62.9%
1906 (60th Congress)	✓ Asle J. Gronna	Republican	36,772	62.9%
1906 (60th Congress)	A. G. Burr	Democratic	21,350	35.2%
1906 (60th Congress)	John D. Benton	Democratic	21,050	35.2%
1906 (60th Congress)	Kittel Halvorson	Socialist	1,151	1.9%
1906 (60th Congress)	W. J. Bailey	Socialist	1,129	1.9%
1908 (61st Congress)	✓ Asle J. Gronna	Republican	57,357	65.7%
1908 (61st Congress)	✓ Louis B. Hanna	Republican	55,610	65.7%
1908 (61st Congress)	Tobias D. Casey	Democratic	29,426	33.7%
1908 (61st Congress)	O. G. Major	Democratic	28,448	33.7%
1908 (61st Congress)	Francis Cooper	Independent	591	0.3%
1908 (61st Congress)	E. D. Herring	Independent	533	0.3%
1910 (62nd Congress)	✓ Louis B. Hanna	Republican	51,556	63.9%
1910 (62nd Congress)	✓ Henry T. Helgesen	Republican	50,600	63.9%
1910 (62nd Congress)	Tobias D. Casey	Democratic	25,880	32.0%
1910 (62nd Congress)	M. A. Hildreth	Democratic	25,322	32.0%
1910 (62nd Congress)	Arthur Hagendorf	Socialist	3,225	4.0%
1910 (62nd Congress)	N. H. Bjornstad	Socialist	3,179	4.0%
1912–1930	Districts used			
Year (& Congress)	Candidate	Party	Votes	%
1932 (73rd Congress)	✓ James H. Sinclair	Republican	144,339	65.7%
1932 (73rd Congress)	✓ William Lemke	Republican–NPL	135,339	65.7%
1932 (73rd Congress)	William D. Lynch	Democratic	72,659	33.9%
1932 (73rd Congress)	R. B. Murphy	Democratic	71,695	33.9%
1932 (73rd Congress)	Pat J. Barrett	Independent	690	0.3%
1932 (73rd Congress)	Ella Reeve Bloor	Independent	678%	0.3%
1934 (74th Congress)	✓ William Lemke	Republican–NPL	144,605	49.9%
1934 (74th Congress)	✓ Usher L. Burdick	Republican–NPL	114,841	49.9%
1934 (74th Congress)	William D. Lynch	Democratic	85,771	31.8%
1934 (74th Congress)	G. F. Lamb	Democratic	79,338	31.8%
1934 (74th Congress)	James H. Sinclair	Progressive Republican	46,304	17.8%
1934 (74th Congress)	Jasper Haaland	Communist	1,299	0.5%
1934 (74th Congress)	Effie Kjorstad	Communist	1,090	0.5%
1936 (75th Congress)	✓ William Lemke	Republican–NPL	131,117	54.1%
1936 (75th Congress)	✓ Usher L. Burdick	Republican–NPL	115,913	54.1%
1936 (75th Congress)	Henry Holt	Democratic	100,609	41.7%
1936 (75th Congress)	J. J. Nygaard	Democratic	89,722	41.7%
1936 (75th Congress)	I. J. Moe	Independent	3,310	1.4%
1936 (75th Congress)	P. H. Miller	Independent	3,273	1.4%
1936 (75th Congress)	E. A. Johannson	Independent	2,697	1.2%
1936 (75th Congress)	Jasper Haaland	Communist	540	0.2%
1936 (75th Congress)	W. D. Webster	Communist	461	0.2%
1938 (76th Congress)	✓ William Lemke	Republican–NPL	153,106	72.3%
1938 (76th Congress)	✓ Usher L. Burdick	Republican–NPL	149,047	72.3%
1938 (76th Congress)	Howard I. Henry	Democratic	55,125	23.9%
1938 (76th Congress)	Alfred S. Dale	Democratic	44,691	23.9%
1938 (76th Congress)	J. B. Field	Independent	8,109	3.9%
1940 (77th Congress)	✓ Usher L. Burdick	Republican–NPL	148,227	60.3%
1940 (77th Congress)	✓ Charles R. Robertson	Republican	111,125	60.3%
1940 (77th Congress)	R. J. Downey	Democratic	63,662	29.4%
1940 (77th Congress)	Adolph Michelson	Democratic	63,027	29.4%
1940 (77th Congress)	Thomas Hall	Independent	23,399	10.3%
1940 (77th Congress)	John Omland	Independent	20,845	10.3%
1942 (78th Congress)	✓ Usher L. Burdick	Republican–NPL	85,936	46.3%
1942 (78th Congress)	✓ William Lemke	Republican–NPL	65,905	46.3%
1942 (78th Congress)	Charles R. Robertson	Independent	48,472	29.5%
1942 (78th Congress)	Halvor L. Halvorson	Democratic	47,972	24.2%
1942 (78th Congress)	E. A. Johansson	Democratic	31,547	24.2%
1944 (79th Congress)	✓ William Lemke	Republican–NPL	101,007	50.7%
1944 (79th Congress)	✓ Charles R. Robertson	Republican	91,425	50.7%
1944 (79th Congress)	Halvor L. Halvorson	Democratic	56,699	26.9%
1944 (79th Congress)	J. R. Kennedy	Democratic	45,308	26.9%
1944 (79th Congress)	Usher L. Burdick	Independent R	39,888	21.0%
1944 (79th Congress)	George McClellan	Independent R	3,135	1.4%
1944 (79th Congress)	A. C. Townley	Independent R	2,307	1.4%
1946 (80th Congress)	✓ William Lemke	Republican–NPL	103,205	74.3%
1946 (80th Congress)	✓ Charles R. Robertson	Republican	102,087	74.3%
1946 (80th Congress)	James M. Hanley	Democratic	41,189	25.7%
1946 (80th Congress)	Edwin Cooper	Democratic	29,865	25.7%
1948 (81st Congress)	✓ William Lemke	Republican–NPL	132,343	69.0%
1948 (81st Congress)	✓ Usher L. Burdick	Republican–NPL	128,454	69.0%
1948 (81st Congress)	Alfred Dale	Democratic	56,702	30.0%
1948 (81st Congress)	John M. Weiler	Progressive	1,758	0.9%
1950 (82nd Congress)	✓ Fred G. Aandahl	Republican	119,047	70.7%
1950 (82nd Congress)	✓ Usher L. Burdick	Republican–NPL	110,534	70.7%
1950 (82nd Congress)	Ervin Schumacher	Democratic	62,322	29.3%
1950 (82nd Congress)	E. A. Johansson	Democratic	32,946	29.3%
1952 (83rd Congress)	✓ Usher L. Burdick	Republican–NPL	181,218	77.2%
1952 (83rd Congress)	✓ Otto Krueger	Republican	156,829	77.2%
1952 (83rd Congress)	Edward Nesemeier	Democratic	49,829	22.8%
1952 (83rd Congress)	Scattered votes		49	0.0%
1954 (84th Congress)	✓ Usher L. Burdick	Republican–NPL	124,845	67.1%
1954 (84th Congress)	✓ Otto Krueger	Republican	106,341	67.1%
1954 (84th Congress)	P. W. Lanier	Democratic	64,089	32.9%
1954 (84th Congress)	Raymond G. Vendsel	Democratic	49,183	32.9%
1956 (85th Congress)	✓ Usher L. Burdick	Republican–NPL	143,514	62.3%
1956 (85th Congress)	✓ Otto Krueger	Republican	136,003	62.3%
1956 (85th Congress)	Agnes Geelan	Democratic–NPL	85,743	37.7%
1956 (85th Congress)	S. B. Hocking	Democratic–NPL	83,284	37.7%
1958 (86th Congress)	✓ Quentin Burdick	Democratic–NPL	99,562	48.4%
1958 (86th Congress)	✓ Don L. Short	Republican	97,862	51.6%
1958 (86th Congress)	Orris G. Nordhougen	Republican	92,124	51.6%
1958 (86th Congress)	S. B. Hocking	Democratic–NPL	78,889	
1960 (87th Congress)	✓ Don L. Short	Republican	135,579	53.3%
1960 (87th Congress)	✓ Hjalmar C. Nygaard	Republican	127,118	53.3%
1960 (87th Congress)	Raymond Vendsel	Democratic–NPL	120,773	46.7%
1960 (87th Congress)	Anson J. Anderson	Democratic–NPL	109,207	46.7%
1962–1970	Districts used			
Year (& Congress)	Candidate	Party	Votes	%
1972 (93rd Congress)	✓ Mark Andrews	Republican	195,360	72.7%
1972 (93rd Congress)	Richard Ista	Democratic–NPL	72,850	27.1%
1972 (93rd Congress)	Kenneth C. Gardener Sr.	Independent	511	0.2%
1974 (94th Congress)	✓ Mark Andrews	Republican	130,184	55.7%
1974 (94th Congress)	Byron Dorgan	Democratic–NPL	103,504	44.3%
1976 (95th Congress)	✓ Mark Andrews	Republican	181,018	62.4%
1976 (95th Congress)	Lloyd B. Omdahl	Democratic–NPL	104,263	36.0%
1976 (95th Congress)	Russell Kleppe	American	4,600	1.6%
1978 (96th Congress)	✓ Mark Andrews	Republican	147,712	67.0%
1978 (96th Congress)	Bruce F. Hagen	Democratic–NPL	68,016	30.9%
1978 (96th Congress)	Harley J. McLain	Independent	3,197	1.5%
1978 (96th Congress)	Don J. Klingensmith	Prohibition	1,389	0.6%
1980 (97th Congress)	✓ Byron Dorgan	Democratic–NPL	166,437	56.8%
1980 (97th Congress)	Jim Smykowski	Republican	124,707	42.6%
1980 (97th Congress)	John Lengenfelder	Independent	1,004	0.3%
1980 (97th Congress)	Torfin A. Teigen	Independent	928	0.3%
1982 (98th Congress)	✓ Byron Dorgan	Democratic–NPL	186,534	71.6%
1982 (98th Congress)	Kent Jones	Republican	72,241	27.7%
1982 (98th Congress)	Don J. Klingensmith	Prohibition	1,724	0.7%
1984 (99th Congress)	✓ Byron Dorgan	Democratic–NPL	242,968	78.7%
1984 (99th Congress)	Lois Ivers Altenburg	Republican	65,761	21.3%
1986 (100th Congress)	✓ Byron Dorgan	Democratic–NPL	216,258	75.5%
1986 (100th Congress)	Syver Vinje	Republican	66,989	23.4%
1986 (100th Congress)	Gerald W. Kopp	Independent	3,114	1.1%
1988 (101st Congress)	✓ Byron Dorgan	Democratic–NPL	212,583	70.9%
1988 (101st Congress)	Steve Sydness	Republican	84,475	28.2%
1988 (101st Congress)	Kris Brekke	Libertarian	2,924	1.0%
1990 (102nd Congress)	✓ Byron Dorgan	Democratic–NPL	152,530	65.2%
1990 (102nd Congress)	Ed Schafer	Republican	81,443	34.8%
1990 (102nd Congress)	Other		6	0.0%
1992 (103rd Congress)	✓ Earl Pomeroy	Democratic–NPL	169,273	56.8%
1992 (103rd Congress)	John T. Korsmo	Republican	117,442	39.4%
1992 (103rd Congress)	Other		11,183	3.8%
1994 (104th Congress)	✓ Earl Pomeroy	Democratic–NPL	123,134	52.3%
1994 (104th Congress)	Gary Porter	Republican	105,988	45.0%
1994 (104th Congress)	James Germalic	Independent	6,267	2.7%
1996 (105th Congress)	✓ Earl Pomeroy	Democratic–NPL	144,833	55.1%
1996 (105th Congress)	Kevin Cramer	Republican	113,684	43.2%
1996 (105th Congress)	Kenneth R. Loughead	Independent	4,493	1.7%
1998 (106th Congress)	✓ Earl Pomeroy	Democratic–NPL	119,668	56.2%
1998 (106th Congress)	Kevin Cramer	Republican	87,511	41.1%
1998 (106th Congress)	Kenneth R. Loughead	Independent	5,709	2.7%
2000 (107th Congress)	✓ Earl Pomeroy	Democratic–NPL	151,173	52.9%
2000 (107th Congress)	John Dorso	Republican	127,251	44.5%
2000 (107th Congress)	Jan Shelver	Independent	4,731	1.7%
2000 (107th Congress)	Kenneth R. Loughead	Independent	2,481	0.9%
2000 (107th Congress)	Write-in		22	0.0%
2002 (108th Congress)	✓ Earl Pomeroy	Democratic–NPL	121,073	52.4%
2002 (108th Congress)	Rick Clayburgh	Republican	109,957	47.6%
2004 (109th Congress)	✓ Earl Pomeroy	Democratic–NPL	185,130	59.6%
2004 (109th Congress)	Duane Sand	Republican	125,684	40.4%
2006 (110th Congress)	✓ Earl Pomeroy	Democratic–NPL	142,934	65.7%
2006 (110th Congress)	Matt Mechtel	Republican	74,687	34.3%
2008 (111th Congress)	✓ Earl Pomeroy	Democratic–NPL	194,175	62.1%
2008 (111th Congress)	Duane Sand	Republican	118,519	37.9%
2010 (112th Congress)	✓ Rick Berg	Republican	129,802	54.7%
2010 (112th Congress)	Earl Pomeroy	Democratic–NPL	106,542	44.9%
2010 (112th Congress)	Write-in		793	0.4%
2012 (113th Congress)	✓ Kevin Cramer	Republican	172,905	55.0%
2012 (113th Congress)	Pam Gulleson	Democratic–NPL	131,396	41.8%
2012 (113th Congress)	Eric Olson	Libertarian	10,125	3.2%
2014 (114th Congress)	✓ Kevin Cramer	Republican	138,100	55.5%
2014 (114th Congress)	George B. Sinner	Democratic–NPL	95,678	38.5%
2014 (114th Congress)	Robert J. "Jack" Seaman	Libertarian	14,531	5.8%
2016 (115th Congress)	✓ Kevin Cramer	Republican	233,980	69.1%
2016 (115th Congress)	Chase Iron Eyes	Democratic–NPL	80,377	23.8%
2016 (115th Congress)	Robert J. "Jack" Seaman	Libertarian	23,528	7%
2018 (116th Congress)	✓ Kelly Armstrong	Republican	193,568	60.2%
2018 (116th Congress)	Mac Schneider	Democratic–NPL	114,377	35.6%
2018 (116th Congress)	Charles Tuttle	Independent	13,066	4.1%
2018 (116th Congress)	Write-in		521	0.16%
2020 (117th Congress)	✓ Kelly Armstrong	Republican	245,229	68.96%
2020 (117th Congress)	Zach Raknerud	Democratic–NPL	97,970	27.55%
2020 (117th Congress)	Steven Peterson	Libertarian	12,024	3.38%
2020 (117th Congress)	Write-in		375	0.11%
2022 (118th Congress)	✓ Kelly Armstrong	Republican	148,399	62.20%
2022 (118th Congress)	Cara Mund	Independent	89,644	37.76%
2022 (118th Congress)	Write-in		543	0.23%
Year (& Congress)	Candidate	Party	Votes	%

=== 2006 ===
North Dakota's at-large congressional district election, 2006
Party	Candidate	Votes	%	±%
Democratic–NPL	Earl Pomeroy (Incumbent)	142,934	65.68%	+6.11%
Republican	Matt Mechtel	74,687	34.32%	−6.11%
Democratic–NPL hold		Swing		
Turnout		217,621		

=== 2008 ===
North Dakota's at-large congressional district election, 2008
Party	Candidate	Votes	%	±%
Democratic–NPL	Earl Pomeroy (Incumbent)	194,577	61.97%	−3.71%
Republican	Duane Sand	119,388	38.03%	+3.71%
Democratic–NPL hold		Swing		
Turnout		313,965		

=== 2010 ===
North Dakota's at-large congressional district election, 2010
Party	Candidate	Votes	%	±%
Republican	Rick Berg	129,802	54.74%	+16.71%
Democratic–NPL	Earl Pomeroy (Incumbent)	106,542	44.93%	−17.04%
Independent	Write-In Votes	793	0.33%	
Republican gain from Democratic–NPL		Swing		
Turnout		237,137		

=== 2012 ===
North Dakota's at-large congressional district election, 2012
Party	Candidate	Votes	%	±%
Republican	Kevin Cramer	173,585	54.89%	+0.15%
Democratic–NPL	Pam Gulleson	131,870	41.70%	−3.23%
Libertarian	Eric Olson	10,261	3.24%	+3.24%
Independent	Write-In Votes	508	0.16%	
Republican hold		Swing		
Turnout		316,224		

=== 2014 ===
North Dakota's at-large congressional district election, 2014
Party	Candidate	Votes	%	±%
Republican	Kevin Cramer (Incumbent)	138,100	55.54%	+0.65%
Democratic–NPL	George B. Sinner	95,678	38.48%	−3.22%
Libertarian	Robert J. "Jack" Seaman	14,531	5.84%	+2.6%
Independent	Write-In Votes	361	0.15%	
Republican hold		Swing		
Turnout		248,670		

=== 2016 ===
North Dakota's at-large congressional district election, 2016
Party	Candidate	Votes	%	±%
Republican	Kevin Cramer (Incumbent)	233,980	69.13%	+13.59%
Democratic–NPL	Chase Iron Eyes	80,377	23.75%	−14.73%
Libertarian	Robert J. "Jack" Seaman	23,528	6.95%	+1.11%
Independent	Write-In Votes	574	0.17%	
Republican hold		Swing		
Turnout		338,459		

=== 2018 ===
North Dakota's at-large congressional district election, 2018
Party	Candidate	Votes	%	±%
Republican	Kelly Armstrong	193,568	60.20%	−8.93%
Democratic–NPL	Mac Schneider	114,377	35.57%	+11.82%
Independent	Charles Tuttle	13,066	4.06%	
n/a	Write-ins	521	0.16%	
Total votes		321,532	100.00%	
Republican hold				

=== 2020 ===
North Dakota's at-large congressional district election, 2020
Party	Candidate	Votes	%	±%
Republican	Kelly Armstrong (incumbent)	245,229	68.96%	+8.76%
Democratic–NPL	Zach Raknerud	97,970	27.55%	−8.02%
Libertarian	Steven Peterson	12,024	3.38%	New
n/a	Write-ins	375	0.11%	−0.15%
Total votes		355,595	100.0%	
Republican hold				

=== 2022 ===
North Dakota's at-large congressional district election, 2022
Party	Candidate	Votes	%	±%
Republican	Kelly Armstrong (incumbent)	148,399	62.20%	–6.76
Independent	Cara Mund	89,644	37.57%	N/A
Write-in		543	0.23%	+0.12
Total votes		238,586	100.00%	
Republican hold				

=== 2024 ===
North Dakota's at-large congressional district election, 2024
Party	Candidate	Votes	%	±%
Republican	Julie Fedorchak	249,101	69.24%	+7.04%
Democratic–NPL	Trygve Hammer	109,231	30.36%	N/A
Write-in		1,455	0.40%	+0.17%
Total votes		359,787	100.00%	N/A
Republican hold				
