= 2012 United States Senate election in North Dakota =

- November 6, 2012
- Turnout: 60.6% (voting eligible)
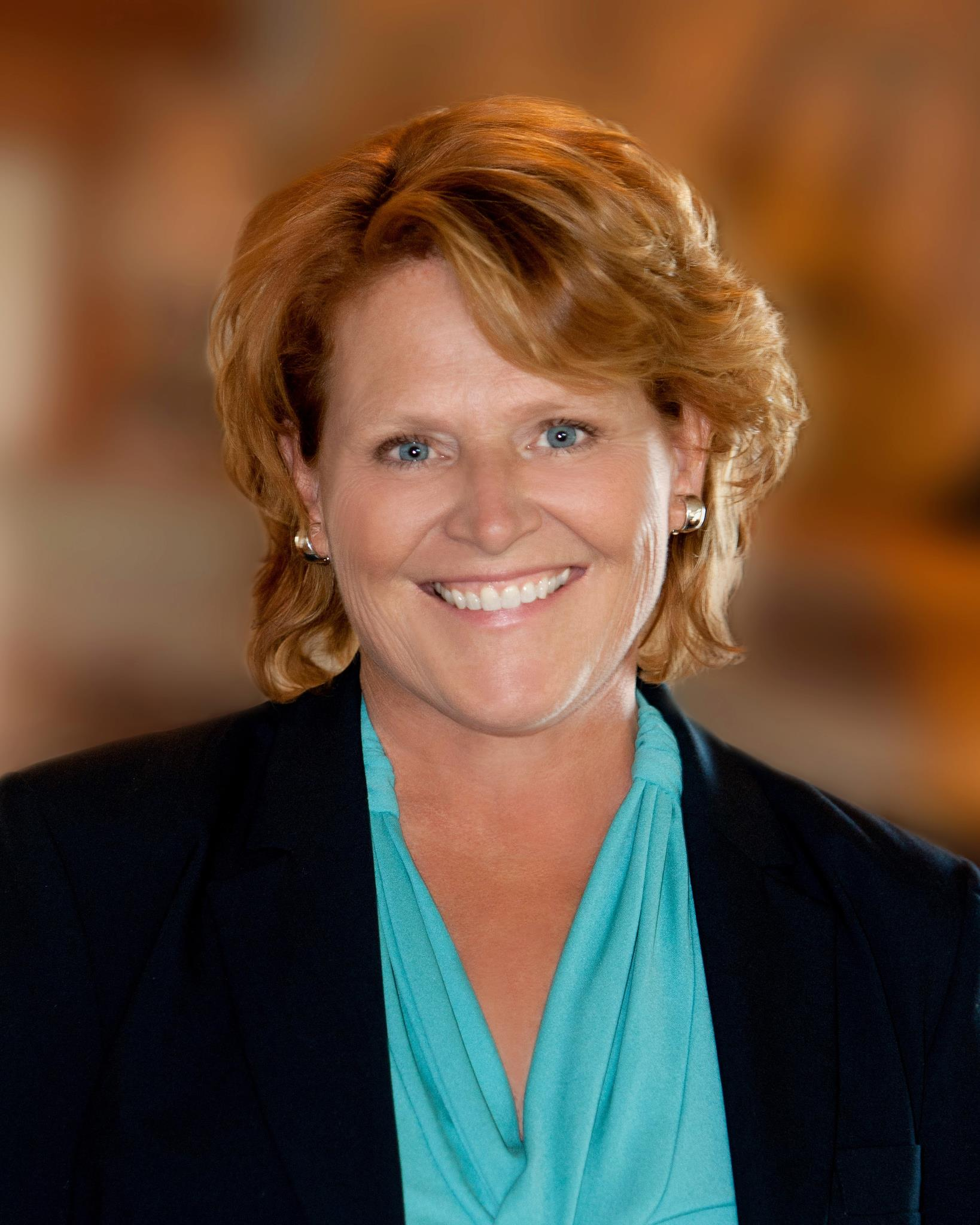

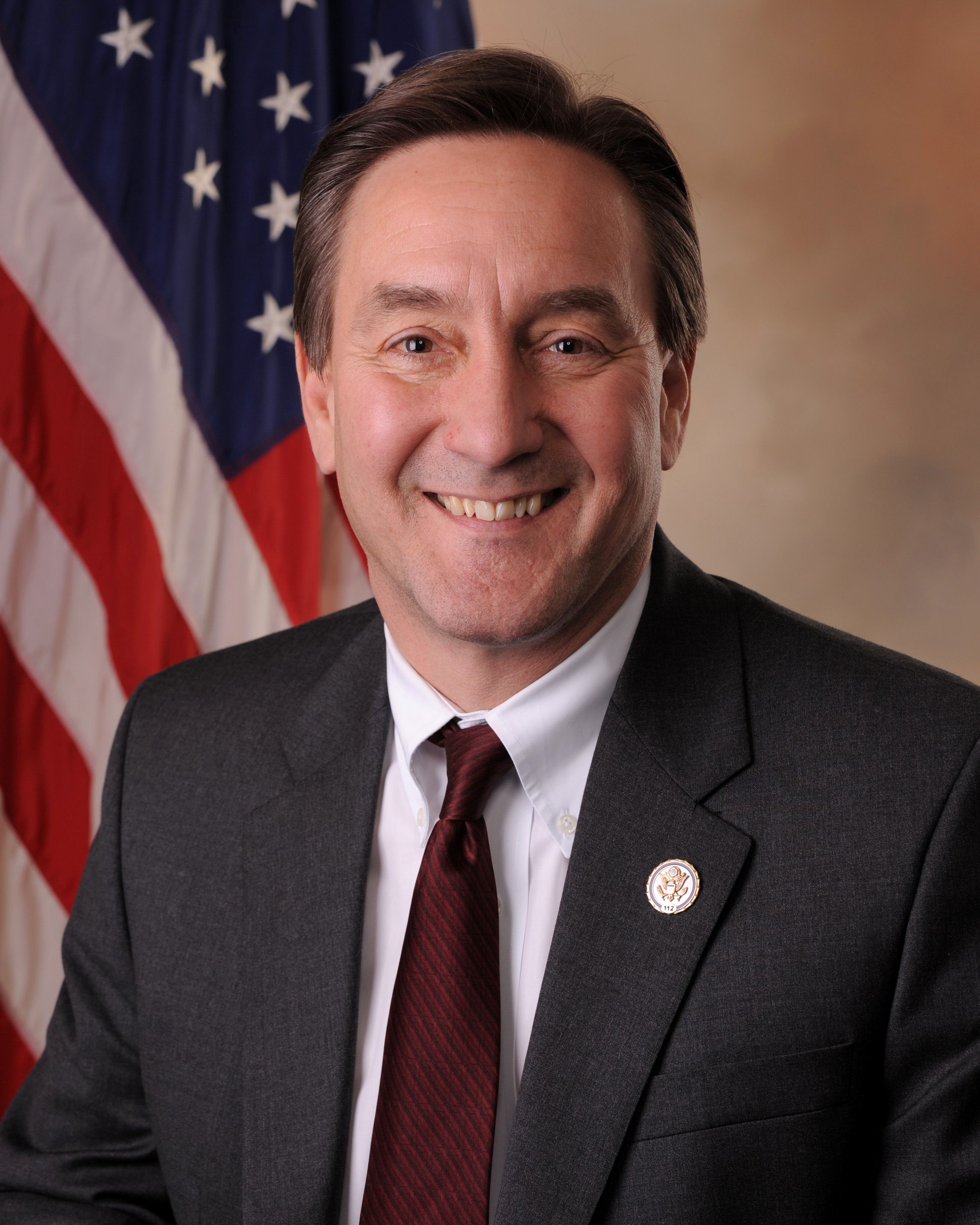
Nominee	Heidi Heitkamp	Rick Berg
Party	Democratic–NPL	Republican
Popular vote	161,337	158,401
Percentage	50.24%	49.32%
- Heitkamp: 40–50% 50–60% 60–70% 80–90% Berg: 40–50% 50–60% 60–70% 70–80%
U.S. senator before election
Kent Conrad
Democratic–NPL
Elected U.S. Senator
Heidi Heitkamp
Democratic–NPL

The 2012 United States Senate election in North Dakota took place on November 6, 2012, concurrently with the 2012 U.S. presidential election, other United States Senate elections, United States House of Representatives elections, and various state and local elections. Incumbent Democratic-NPL Senator Kent Conrad decided to retire instead of running for reelection to a fifth term.

Though each party endorses a single candidate in state conventions in the spring, ballot access for the general election was determined in a primary election held on June 12, 2012.

Heidi Heitkamp, a Democratic-NPL former North Dakota Attorney General, won the open seat over Republican Rick Berg, North Dakota's at-large U.S. representative, by a margin of 0.9%. Heitkamp outperformed President Barack Obama by 20.5%, the latter having lost North Dakota by 19.6% in the concurrent presidential election. Heitkamp's very narrow winning margin made it the closest race of the 2012 United States Senate elections. The victory made Heitkamp the first woman ever elected to Congress from North Dakota. (Note: Jocelyn Burdick was appointed to finish her late husband's term at this seat, but did not run to finish the term.)

As of 2026, this was the last time a Democrat won a federal and/or statewide election in North Dakota, and the last North Dakota U.S. Senate race that was decided by a single-digit margin.

== Democratic-NPL primary ==
The North Dakota Democratic-NPL Party held their state convention March 16–18, 2012, in Grand Forks. Former state attorney general and 2000 Democratic gubernatorial nominee Heidi Heitkamp was uncontested in seeking the official party nomination and was the only member of the party elected to appear on the state primary ballot.

=== Candidates ===
==== Nominee ====
- Heidi Heitkamp, former attorney general of North Dakota and nominee for governor of North Dakota in 2000

==== Withdrew ====
- Thomas Potter, Presbyterian pastor and former professor of finance at UND (dropped out February 2012)

==== Declined ====
- Kent Conrad, incumbent U.S. senator
- Pam Gulleson, former state representative and former chief of staff and former state director for former Senator Byron Dorgan
- Kristin Hedger, nominee for North Dakota Secretary of State in 2006
- Joel Heitkamp, brother of Heidi Heitkamp, radio personality and former state senator
- Roger Johnson, president of the National Farmers Union and former North Dakota agriculture commissioner
- Tim Mathern, state senator and nominee for governor in 2008
- Earl Pomeroy, former U.S. representative
- Tracy Potter, state senator and nominee for the U.S. Senate in 2010
- Tim Purdon, U.S. attorney
- Jasper Schneider, USDA rural development State Director
- Mac Schneider, state senator
- Ryan Taylor, minority leader of the North Dakota Senate

== Republican primary ==
North Dakota Republicans endorsed U.S. Representative Rick Berg at their convention, though general election ballot access is determined by a statewide primary election held on June 12, 2012. In contrast to state political tradition, declared candidate Duane Sand did not seek the party endorsement, trying instead to defeat Berg on the June primary ballot.

=== Candidates ===
==== Nominee ====
- Rick Berg, U.S. representative

==== Eliminated in primary ====
- Duane Sand, former North and South Dakota director for Americans for Prosperity, nominee for ND-AL in 2004 and 2008

==== Declined ====
- Al Carlson, North Dakota state house majority leader
- Tony Clark, state public service commissioner
- Kevin Cramer, state public service commissioner
- Jack Dalrymple, North Dakota governor and 1992 Republican nominee for U.S. Senate
- Cory Fong, state tax commissioner
- Shane Goettle, U.S. Senator John Hoeven's state director
- Tony Grindberg, state senator
- Bob Harms, North Dakota Republican Party treasurer
- Brian Kalk, state public service commissioner (running for House)
- Kim Koppelman, state representative
- Ed Schafer, former U.S. agriculture secretary and former North Dakota governor
- Kelly Schmidt, North Dakota treasurer
- Wayne Stenehjem, North Dakota attorney general
- John Warford, mayor of Bismarck
- Drew Wrigley, North Dakota lieutenant governor

=== Endorsements ===
Rick Berg

Senators

- John Hoeven, U.S. senator from North Dakota
- Kay Bailey Hutchison, U.S. senator from Texas

Governors

- Mitt Romney, former governor of Massachusetts and Republican nominee for president in 2012

Legislators

- Nancy Johnson, state representative
- George Nodland, state senator
- Mike Schatz, state representative
- Vicky Steiner, state representative
- Rich Wardner, state senate majority leader

Mayors

- Katie Anderson, mayor of Jamestown
- Mike Hynek, mayor of Stanley
- Dennis Johnson, mayor of Dickinson
- Ward Koeser, mayor of Williston
- Rich Mattern, mayor of West Fargo
- Ed McConnell, mayor of Casselton
- Brent Sanford, mayor of Watford City
- Jim Sturdevant, mayor of Wahpeton
- John Warford, mayor of Bismarck
- Curt Zimbelman, mayor of Minot

Organizations

- North Dakota Farm Bureau
- NRA Political Victory Fund
- Susan B. Anthony List

=== Polling ===
Poll source	Date(s) administered	Sample size	Margin of error	Rick Berg	Duane Sand	Undecided
Mason-Dixon	June 4–6, 2012	625	± 4.0%	73%	16%	11%
Essman Research	May 3–8, 2012	500	± 4.3%	65%	21%	14%

=== Results ===
Results by county: Berg—80–90% Berg—70–80% Berg—60–70% Berg—50–60%

Republican primary results
Party	Candidate	Votes	%
Republican	Rick Berg	67,849	66.41%
Republican	Duane Sand	34,209	33.48%
Republican	Write-ins	111	.41%
Total votes		102,281	100.00%

== General election ==
=== Candidates ===
- Rick Berg (R), U.S. representative
- Heidi Heitkamp (D), former attorney general of North Dakota and nominee for governor in 2000
- Bill Kiefer (I), businessman

=== Debates ===
- Complete video of debate, October 15, 2012 – C-SPAN
- Complete video of debate, October 25, 2012 – C-SPAN

=== Fundraising ===
Candidate (party)	Receipts	Disbursements	Cash on hand	Debt
Heidi Heitkamp (D-NPL)	$5,341,362	$5,318,232	$23,130	$0
Rick Berg (R)	$6,501,693	$6,129,026	$316,641	$0
Source: Federal Election Commission

==== Top contributors ====
Heidi Heitkamp	Contribution	Rick Berg	Contribution
Motley Rice LLC	$41,750	Verizon Communications	$43,666
Council for a Livable World	$26,705	Elliott Management Corporation	$29,413
Weitz & Luxenberg	$22,400	NORPAC	$26,700
Robbins Geller Rudman & Dowd LLP	$15,050	Mewbourne Oil Co	$25,000
Medcenter One Health Systems	$12,000	Rurban Financial	$22,700
American Association for Justice	$10,833	Hess Corp	$22,500
Akin Gump Strauss Hauer & Feld	$10,750	NACCO Industries	$22,000
American Federation of Teachers	$10,300	Marathon Oil	$21,000
Patton Boggs LLP	$10,250	Berkshire Hathaway	$20,500
American Postal Workers Union	$10,000	Koch Industries	$20,000

==== Top industries ====
Heidi Heitkamp	Contribution	Rick Berg	Contribution
Lawyers/law firms	$433,811	Oil & gas	$433,949
Leadership PACs	$284,500	Leadership PACs	$277,163
Women's issues	$111,593	Financial institutions	$274,941
Lobbyists	$103,635	Retired	$218,909
Retired	$100,812	Real estate	$171,686
Agribusiness	$78,450	Agribusiness	$163,583
Public sector unions	$73,800	Insurance	$140,011
Financial institutions	$64,713	Commercial banks	$127,140
Education	$60,960	Health professionals	$114,438
Building trade unions	$52,500	Mining	$106,804

==== Independent expenditures ====
In early October 2012, Crossroads GPS announced that it would launch a $16 million advertising buy in national races, of which four were this and three other Senate elections.

=== Predictions ===
Source	Ranking	As of
The Cook Political Report	Tossup	November 1, 2012
Inside Elections	Tilt R (flip)	November 2, 2012
Sabato's Crystal Ball	Lean R (flip)	November 5, 2012
Real Clear Politics	Tossup	November 5, 2012

=== Polling ===
Poll source	Date(s) administered	Sample size	Margin of error	Heidi Heitkamp (D-NPL)	Rick Berg (R)	Other	Undecided
Pharos Research	November 2–5, 2012	503	± 4.1%	47%	49%	—	4%
Pharos Research	October 26–28, 2012	752	± 3.6%	50%	48%	—	2%
Mason-Dixon	October 26–28, 2012	625	± 4.0%	45%	47%	—	8%
The Mellman Group (D-Heitkamp)	October 21–24, 2012	600	± 4.0%	48%	44%	—	7%
Pharos Research	October 19–21, 2012	807	± 3.4%	49%	48%	—	3%
The Mellman Group (D-Heitkamp)	October 16–19, 2012	600	± 4.0%	45%	42%	—	13%
Rasmussen Reports	October 17–18, 2012	600	± 4.0%	45%	50%	—	5%
Essman Research	October 12–15, 2012	500	± 4.4%	40%	50%	—	10%
Mason-Dixon	October 3–5, 2012	625	± 4.0%	47%	47%	—	6%
DFM Research (D)	September 24–27, 2012	600	± 4.0%	48%	44%	—	8%
DFM Research (D)	July 24–26, 2012	400	± 4.9%	50%	44%	—	6%
Rasmussen Reports	July 10–11, 2012	400	± 5.0%	40%	49%	2%	8%
Mason-Dixon	June 4–6, 2012	625	± 4.0%	47%	46%	—	7%
Essman Research	May 3–8, 2012	500	± 4.3%	44%	51%	—	5%
DFM Research (D)	April 18–26, 2012	478	± 4.5%	49%	44%	1%	6%

=== Results ===
United States Senate election in North Dakota, 2012
Party	Candidate	Votes	%	±%
Democratic–NPL	Heidi Heitkamp	161,337	50.24%	−18.58%
Republican	Rick Berg	158,401	49.32%	+19.79%
Write-in		1,406	0.44%	N/A
Total votes		321,144	100.00%	N/A
Democratic–NPL hold				

==== By county ====
By county

County	Heidi Heitkamp Democratic–NPL		Rick Berg Republican		Write-in		Margin		Total votes
County	#	%	#	%	#	%	#	%	Total votes
Adams	473	36.90	806	62.87	3	0.23	-333	-25.97	1,282
Barnes	3,181	57.51	2,329	42.11	21	0.38	852	15.40	5,531
Benson	1,453	67.08	709	32.73	4	0.18	744	34.45	2,166
Billings	160	27.92	412	71.90	1	0.17	-252	-43.98	573
Bottineau	1,636	46.33	1,875	53.10	20	0.57	-239	-6.77	3,531
Bowman	621	36.29	1,086	63.47	4	0.23	-465	-27.18	1,711
Burke	360	35.29	657	64.41	3	0.29	-731	-29.12	1,020
Burleigh	19,284	44.79	23,538	54.67	231	0.54	-4,254	-9.88	43,053
Cass	41,480	56.51	31,569	43.00	359	0.49	9,911	13.51	73,408
Cavalier	1,087	52.49	977	47.18	7	0.34	110	5.31	2,071
Dickey	1,125	44.43	1,399	55.25	8	0.32	-274	-10.92	2,532
Divide	592	50.95	567	48.80	3	0.26	25	2.15	1,162
Dunn	746	36.71	1,283	63.14	3	0.15	-537	-26.43	2,032
Eddy	693	60.00	455	39.39	7	0.61	238	20.61	1,155
Emmons	709	37.85	1,152	61.51	12	0.64	-443	-23.66	1,873
Foster	853	51.05	810	48.47	8	0.48	43	2.58	1,671
Golden Valley	265	28.59	660	71.20	2	0.22	-395	-42.61	927
Grand Forks	16,542	55.60	13,101	44.04	107	0.36	3,441	11.56	29,750
Grant	542	38.66	853	60.84	7	0.50	-311	-22.18	1,402
Griggs	704	52.85	628	47.15	0	0.00	76	5.70	1,332
Hettinger	511	37.63	843	62.08	4	0.29	-332	-24.45	1,358
Kidder	613	46.19	706	53.20	8	0.60	-93	-7.01	1,327
LaMoure	1,065	48.34	1,125	51.07	13	0.59	-60	-2.73	2,203
Logan	446	42.00	610	57.44	6	0.56	-164	-15.44	1,062
McHenry	1,359	50.20	1,339	49.46	9	0.33	20	0.74	2,707
McIntosh	648	42.35	872	56.99	10	0.65	-224	-14.64	1,530
McKenzie	1,229	36.02	2,177	63.80	6	0.18	-948	-26.98	3,412
McLean	2,357	47.96	2,544	51.76	14	0.28	-187	-3.80	4,915
Mercer	1,807	40.59	2,627	59.01	18	0.40	-820	-18.42	4,452
Morton	6,325	46.68	7,135	52.66	90	0.66	-810	-5.98	13,550
Mountrail	1,745	50.92	1,673	48.82	9	0.26	72	2.10	3,427
Nelson	993	59.50	670	40.14	6	0.36	323	19.36	1,669
Oliver	446	44.33	555	55.17	5	0.50	-109	-10.84	1,006
Pembina	1,672	51.30	1,579	48.45	8	0.25	93	2.85	3,259
Pierce	1,027	47.22	1,136	52.23	12	0.55	-109	-5.01	2,175
Ramsey	2,766	55.18	2,229	44.46	18	0.36	537	10.72	5,013
Ransom	1,669	68.71	755	31.08	5	0.21	914	37.63	2,429
Renville	580	46.00	676	53.61	5	0.40	-96	-7.61	1,261
Richland	4,445	58.39	3,135	41.18	102	1.31	1,310	17.21	7,613
Rolette	3,662	80.08	902	19.72	9	0.20	2,760	60.36	4,573
Sargent	1,321	65.66	679	33.75	12	0.60	642	31.91	2,012
Sheridan	299	36.29	521	63.23	4	0.49	-222	-26.94	824
Sioux	963	83.52	185	16.05	5	0.43	778	67.47	1,153
Slope	149	33.48	294	66.07	2	0.45	-100	-32.59	445
Stark	4,110	35.63	7,393	64.09	32	0.28	-3,283	-28.46	11,535
Steele	641	61.63	398	38.27	1	0.10	243	23.36	1,040
Stutsman	4,800	50.61	4,654	49.07	30	0.32	146	1.54	9,484
Towner	699	59.39	472	40.10	6	0.51	227	19.29	1,177
Traill	2,311	59.06	1,589	40.61	13	0.33	722	18.45	3,913
Walsh	2,645	54.94	2,151	44.68	18	0.37	494	10.26	4,814
Ward	11,230	44.45	13,888	54.97	145	0.57	-2,658	-10.52	25,263
Wells	982	41.59	1,363	57.73	16	0.68	-381	-16.14	2,361
Williams	3,142	32.37	6,541	67.38	24	0.25	-3,399	-35.01	9,707
Totals	161,163	50.23	158,282	49.33	1,406	0.44	2,492	0.9	320,851

Counties that flipped from Democratic to Republican

- Adams (largest city: Hettinger)
- Billings (largest city: Medora)
- Bottineau (largest city: Bottineau)
- Bowman (largest city: Bowman)
- Burke (largest city: Powers Lake)
- Burleigh (largest city: Bismarck)
- Dickey (largest city: Oakes)
- Dunn (largest city: Killdeer)
- Emmons (largest city: Linton)
- Golden Valley (largest city: Beach)
- Grant (largest city: Elgin)
- Hettinger (largest city: Mott)
- Kidder (largest city: Steele)
- LaMoure (largest city: LaMoure)
- Logan (largest city: Napoleon)
- McIntosh (largest city: Wishek)
- McKenzie (largest city: Watford City)
- McLean (largest city: Garrison)
- Mercer (largest city: Beulah)
- Morton (largest city: Mandan)
- Oliver (largest city: Center)
- Pierce (largest city: Rugby)
- Renville (largest city: Mohall)
- Sheridan (largest city: McClusky)
- Slope (largest city: Marmarth)
- Stark (largest city: Dickinson)
- Ward (largest city: Minot)
- Wells (largest city: Harvey)
- Williams (largest city: Williston)

== See also ==
- 2012 United States Senate elections
- 2012 United States House of Representatives election in North Dakota
- 2012 North Dakota gubernatorial election
