= 2026 North Dakota Agriculture Commissioner election =

- November 3, 2026
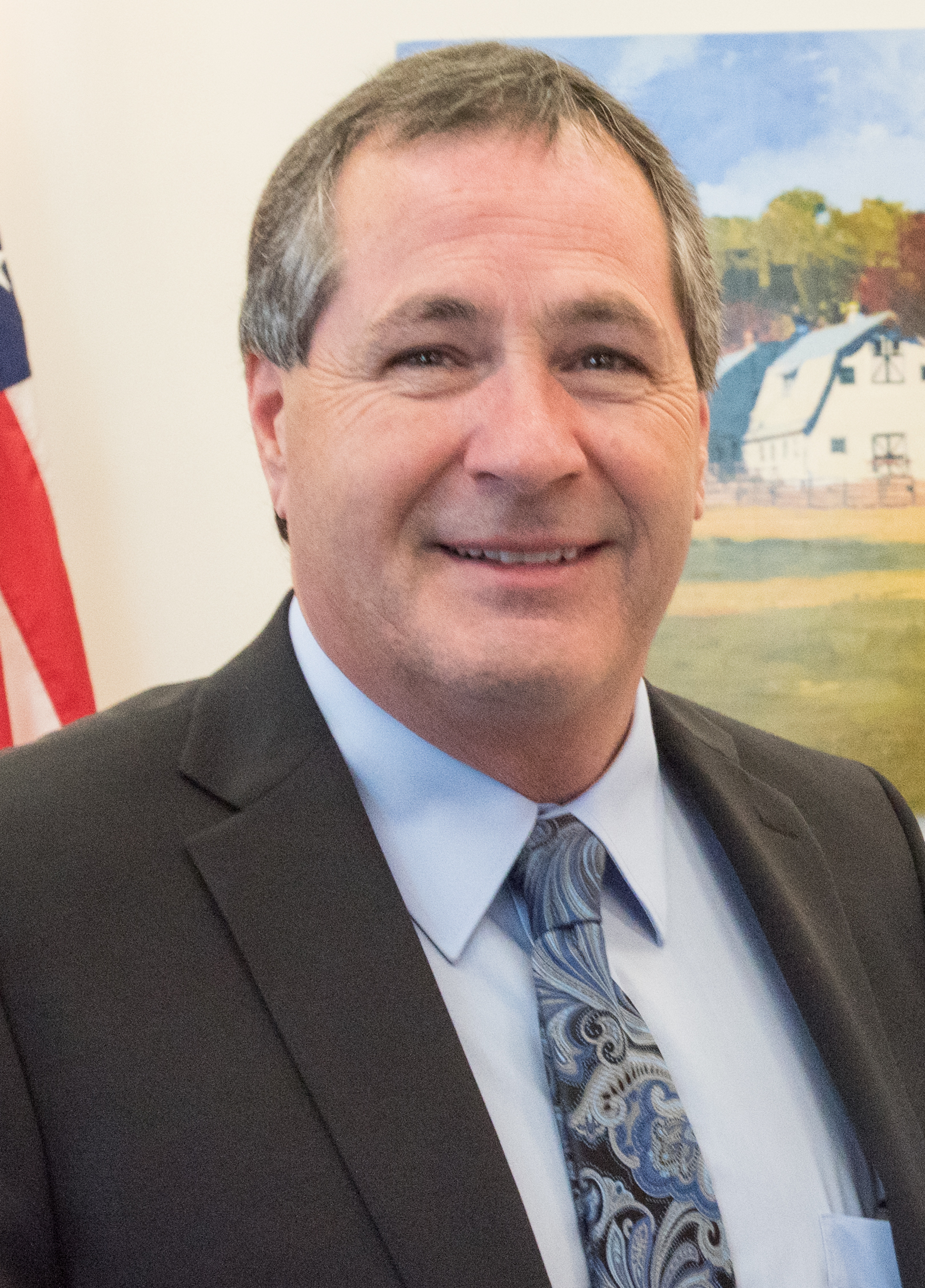

Nominee	Doug Goehring	Vern Thompson
Party	Republican	Democratic–NPL
Incumbent Agriculture Commissioner
Doug Goehring
Republican

An election was held in the U.S. State of North Dakota on November 3, 2026 to elect the North Dakota Agriculture Commissioner to a four-year term. A partisan primary election was held on June 9, 2026.

Incumbent Republican agriculture commissioner Doug Goehring is running for re-election.

== Republican primary ==
=== Nominee ===
- Doug Goehring, incumbent agriculture commissioner

=== Endorsements ===
Declined to endorse

Political parties

- North Dakota Republican Party

=== Results ===
Republican primary results
Party	Candidate	Votes	%
Republican	Doug Goehring (incumbent)	75,154	99.5
Write-in		389	0.5
Total votes		75,543	100.0

== Democratic-NPL primary ==
The Democratic-NPL party convention convened without a candidate seeking endorsement for the office. After former state senator Vern Thompson failed to secure the endorsement for the U.S. House race, the party executive committee, which the convention had empowered to endorse for the race, asked him to run for Agriculture Commissioner. Thompson agreed, and the committee endorsed him.

=== Nominee ===
- Vern Thompson, former state senator from the 12th district (1997–2001)

=== Endorsements ===
Vern Thompson

Political parties

- North Dakota Democratic–Nonpartisan League Party

Labor Unions

- North Dakota AFL-CIO

=== Results ===
Democratic–NPL primary results
Party	Candidate	Votes	%
Democratic–NPL	Vern Thompson	34,146	99.8
Write-in		53	0.2
Total votes		34,199	100.0
