= 2012 United States House of Representatives election in North Dakota =

2012 United States House of Representatives Election in North Dakota
- November 6, 2012
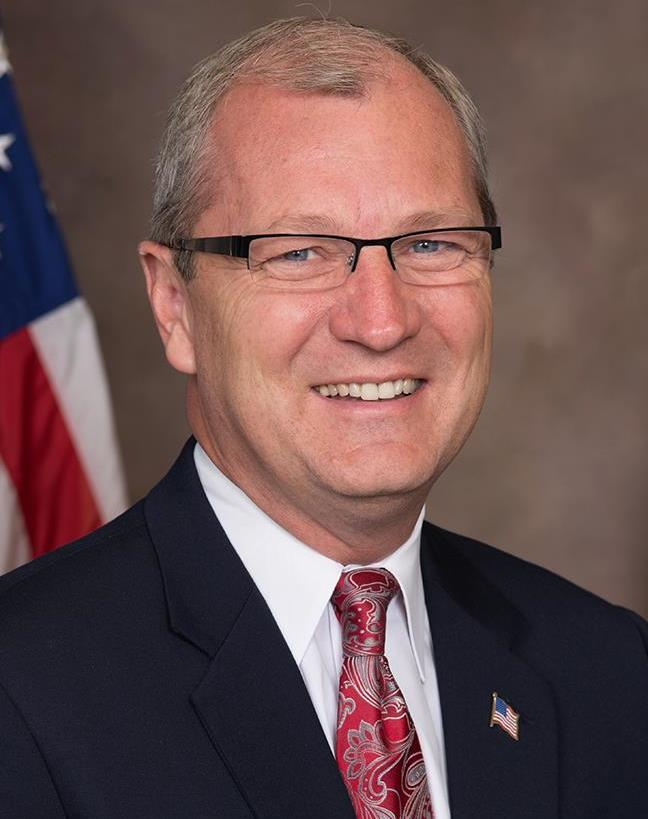

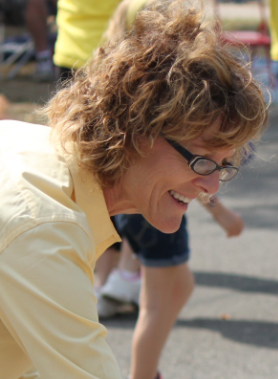
Nominee	Kevin Cramer	Pam Gulleson
Party	Republican	Democratic–NPL
Popular vote	173,433	131,869
Percentage	54.89%	41.70%
- County results Cramer: 40–50% 50–60% 60–70% 70–80% Gulleson: 40–50% 50–60% 60–70% 70–80%
U.S. Representative before election
Rick Berg
Republican
Elected U.S. Representative
Kevin Cramer
Republican

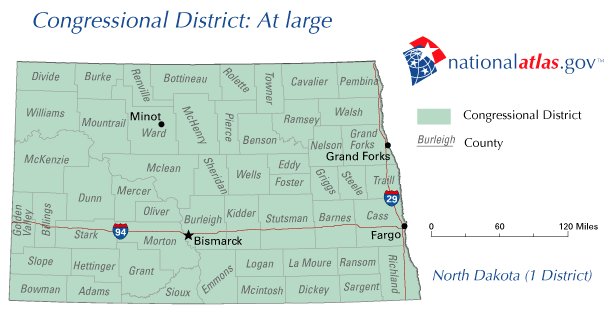

The 2012 United States House of Representatives election in North Dakota was held on Tuesday, November 6, 2012, to elect the U.S. representative from the state's at-large congressional district. The election coincided with the elections of other federal and state offices, including a quadrennial presidential election and an election to the U.S. Senate. A primary election was held on June 12, 2012; a candidate must receive at least 300 votes to appear on the general election ballot in November.

Rick Berg, a member of the Republican Party who was first elected to represent the at-large district in 2010, had announced that he would not seek re-election and would instead run for the U.S. Senate seat being vacated by Kent Conrad. Republican Kevin Cramer won the open House seat.

== Republican primary ==
The North Dakota Republican Party endorsed Public Service Commissioner Brian Kalk at their state convention, though general election ballot access was determined by a statewide primary election held on June 12, 2012. In contrast to state political tradition, fellow Public Service Commissioner Kevin Cramer did not seek the party endorsement, instead attempting to defeat Kalk on the June primary ballot.

=== Candidates ===
==== Nominee ====
- Kevin Cramer, public service commissioner

==== Eliminated in primary ====
- Brian Kalk, public service commissioner and state party endorsed candidate

==== Withdrew ====
- Shane Goettle, U.S. Senator John Hoeven's state director
- Bette Grande, state representative
- DuWayne Hendrickson, perennial candidate
- Kim Koppelman, state representative

==== Declined ====
- Rick Berg, incumbent U.S. representative
- Al Carlson, state House majority leader
- Tony Clark, public service commissioner
- Cory Fong, North Dakota state tax commissioner
- Tony Grindberg, state senator
- Robert Harms, Tea Party activist and former treasurer of the North Dakota Republican Party
- Kelly Schmidt, North Dakota state treasurer

=== Debate ===
The North Dakota Republican Party held a candidates' debate on December 14 at the campus of Valley City State University. All five GOP candidates declared at the time—Cramer, Goettle, Grande, Kalk, and Koppelman—participated.

=== Polling ===
Poll source	Date(s) administered	Sample size	Margin of error	Kevin Cramer	Brian Kalk	Undecided
Mason Dixon	June 4–6, 2012	625	± 4%	60%	21%	19%
Forum Communications Co.	May 3–8, 2012	500	± 4.3%	38%	25%	27%

=== Results ===
Republican primary results
Party	Candidate	Votes	%
Republican	Kevin Cramer	54,405	54.4
Republican	Brian Kalk	45,415	45.5
n/a	Write-ins	113	0.1
Total votes		99,933	100.0

== Democratic primary ==
=== Candidates ===
==== Nominee ====
- Pam Gulleson, former state representative

==== Declined ====
- Ben Vig, former state representative

=== Results ===
Democratic primary results
Party	Candidate	Votes	%
Democratic–NPL	Pam Gulleson	51,750	99.9
Democratic–NPL	Write-in	74	0.1
Total votes		51,824	100.0

== Libertarian nomination ==
The Libertarian Party of North Dakota selected small business owner Eric Olson as their nominee at a state meeting.

== General election ==
=== Endorsements ===
Kevin Cramer (R)

Organizations

- National Republican Congressional Committee "Young Guns" Program
Pam Gulleson (D)

Organizations

- Blue Dog Coalition
- Democratic Congressional Campaign Committee "Red to Blue" Program

=== Polling ===
Poll source	Date(s) administered	Sample size	Margin of error	Kevin Cramer (R)	Pam Gulleson (D)	Eric Olson (L)	Undecided
Mason Dixon	October 26–28, 2012	625	± 4.0%	50%	40%	2%	8%
Forum/Essman	October 12–15, 2012	500	± 4%	52%	32%	1%	15%
Mason-Dixon	October 3–5, 2012	625	± 4%	49%	37%	2%	12%
Mason Dixon	June 4–6, 2012	625	± 4%	49%	35%	4%	12%
Forum Communications Co.	May 3–8, 2012	500	± 4.3%	61%	23%	–	15%

=== Predictions ===
Source	Ranking	As of
The Cook Political Report	Likely R	November 5, 2012
Rothenberg	Safe R	November 2, 2012
Roll Call	Likely R	November 4, 2012
Sabato's Crystal Ball	Likely R	November 5, 2012
NY Times	Safe R	November 4, 2012
RCP	Likely R	November 4, 2012
The Hill	Likely R	November 4, 2012

=== Results ===
North Dakota's at-large congressional district, 2012
Party	Candidate	Votes	%	±%
Republican	Kevin Cramer	173,585	54.89%	+0.15%
Democratic–NPL	Pam Gulleson	131,870	41.70%	−3.23%
Libertarian	Eric Olson	10,261	3.24%	N/A
n/a	Write-ins	508	0.16%	−0.17%
Total votes		316,224	100.0%	N/A
Republican hold				

==== Counties that flipped from Democratic to Republican ====
- Barnes (largest city: Valley City)
- Grand Forks (largest city: Grand Forks)
- Name (largest city: Stanley)
- Ramsey (largest city: Devils Lake)
- Towner (largest city: Cando)

==== Counties that flipped from Republican to Democratic ====
- Richland (largest city: Wahpeton)
