= 2026 United States House of Representatives election in North Dakota =

2026 United States House of Representatives election in North Dakota's at-large district
- November 3, 2026
- Reporting: 98% as of Nov. 5, 11:00 AM CST
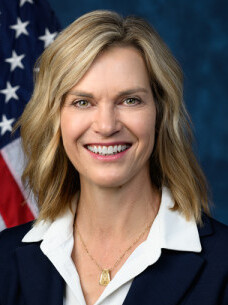

Nominee	Julie Fedorchak	Trygve Hammer
Party	Republican	Democratic–NPL
Popular vote	134,477	85,892
Percentage	57.4%	36.7%
- County results Fedorchak: 40–50% 50–60% 60–70% 70–80% 80–90% Hammer: 50–60% 60–70%
U.S. Representative before election
Julie Fedorchak
Republican
Elected U.S. Representative
Julie Fedorchak
Republican

The 2026 United States House of Representatives election in North Dakota was held on November 3, 2026, to elect a member of the United States House of Representatives to represent the state of North Dakota from its at-large congressional district. The election coincided with other elections held on the same date. Primary elections were held on June 9, 2026.

Republican Julie Fedorchak was elected with 69.24% of the vote in 2024 against Democratic–NPL challenger Trygve Hammer. In the rematch, Fedorchak won re-election on a much smaller margin.

== Republican primary ==
=== Candidates ===
==== Nominee ====
- Julie Fedorchak, incumbent U.S. representative

==== Eliminated in primary ====
- Alex Balazs, former U.S. State Department protect manager and candidate for this district in 2024

==== Disqualified ====
- Ferris Broxton, Businessman from Minot

=== Endorsements ===
Alex Balazs

Political Parties

- North Dakota Republican Party
Julie Fedorchak

Executive branch officials

- Donald Trump, 45th and 47th president of the United States (2017–2021; 2025–present)

=== Fundraising ===
Campaign finance reports as of May 20, 2026
Candidate	Raised	Spent	Cash on hand
Julie Fedorchak (R)	$1,487,812	$702,936	$1,114,204
Alex Balazs (R)	$23,631	$17,936	$5,695
Source: Federal Election Commission

=== Results ===
Unofficial primary results by county: Fedorchak: 60–70%; 70–80%; 80–90%; Balazs: 60–70%

Republican primary results
Party	Candidate	Votes	%
Republican	Julie Fedorchak (incumbent)	59,719	72.9
Republican	Alex Balazs	22,196	27.1
Total votes		81,915	100.0

== Democratic–NPL primary ==
=== Candidates ===
==== Nominee ====
- Trygve Hammer, teacher and nominee for this district in 2024

==== Withdrawn ====
- Vern Thompson, former state senator from the 12th district (1997–2000) (running for agriculture commissioner)

=== Endorsements ===
Trygve Hammer

Political parties

- North Dakota Democratic–Nonpartisan League

=== Fundraising ===
Campaign finance reports as of May 20, 2026
Candidate	Raised	Spent	Cash on hand
Trygve Hammer (D–NPL)	$126,864	$82,463	$44,401
Vern Thompson (D–NPL)	$3,145	$3,145	$0
Source: Federal Election Commission

=== Results ===
Democratic–NPL primary results
Party	Candidate	Votes	%
Democratic–NPL	Trygve Hammer	34,604	100.0
Total votes		34,604	100.0

== Independent candidates ==
=== Declared ===
- Helene Neville, nurse
- Charles Tuttle, Republican activist and perennial candidate

== General election ==
=== Predictions ===
Source	Ranking	As of
Decision Desk HQ	Safe R	July 14, 2026
The Cook Political Report	Solid R	February 6, 2025
Inside Elections	Solid R	March 7, 2025
Sabato's Crystal Ball	Safe R	April 10, 2025

=== Fundraising ===
Campaign finance reports as of June 30, 2026
Candidate	Raised	Spent	Cash on hand
Julie Fedorchak (R)	$1,730,633	$1,004,420	$1,055,571
Trygve Hammer (D-NPL)	$190,064	$122,672	$67,391
Source: Federal Election Commission

=== Results ===
2026 United States House of Representatives election in North Dakota
Party	Candidate	Votes	%	±%
Republican	Julie Fedorchak (incumbent)	134,477	57.41%	–11.83
Democratic–NPL	Trygve Hammer	85,892	36.67%	+6.31
Independent	Charles Tuttle	9,282	3.96%	N/A
Independent	Helene Neville	4,604	1.97%	N/A
Total votes		234,255	100.0%	
Republican hold				
