= John Dorso =

American politician (born 1943)

John M. Dorso

Majority Leader of the North Dakota House of Representatives
- In office 1994,–1999

Member of the North Dakota House of Representatives from the 46th district
- In office 1985–1999

Personal details
- Born: 1943 (age 82–83)
- Party: Republican

John M. Dorso (born 1943) is a North Dakota Republican Party politician who served as the North Dakota House Majority Leader from 1994 to 1999, and in the North Dakota House of Representatives from 1985 to 1999. He was also a candidate for the United States House of Representatives in 2000, against Dem-NPLer Earl Pomeroy.

== See also ==
- 2000 United States House of Representatives election in North Dakota
