= Rick Clayburgh =

American politician (born 1960)

North Dakota Tax Commissioner
- In office 1996 – May 2005
- Governor: Ed Schafer; John Hoeven
- Preceded by: Robert E. Hanson
- Succeeded by: Cory Fong

Personal details
- Born: April 8, 1960 (age 65)
- Party: Republican

Richard S. "Rick" Clayburgh (born April 8, 1960) is a North Dakota Republican politician and current director of the North Dakota Bankers Association. Clayburgh was elected as the state's Tax Commissioner in 1996, and re-elected in 2000 and 2004. He resigned effective May 2005 to become President and CEO of the North Dakota Bankers Association and Cory Fong was appointed to serve until an election in 2006 (where Fong was elected). In responding to Clayburgh's resignation, Governor John Hoeven described him as "a dedicated servant of North Dakota for the past twenty years" who had served with "integrity and distinction" and stated that he would be missed.

Clayburgh was well-favored in his 2002 campaign for North Dakota's at-large congressional district against incumbent Democrat Earl Pomeroy, and ran an aggressive campaign including a visit from then-Vice President Dick Cheney in Fargo, North Dakota. He raised over US$1 million for the campaign. Despite the efforts, Pomeroy edged out Clayburgh and won re-election, with 52% of the vote.

== See also ==
- 2002 United States House of Representatives election in North Dakota

Party political offices
Preceded by Rod Backman	Republican nominee for Tax Commissioner of North Dakota; 1996, 2000, 2004	Succeeded by Cory Fong
Political offices
Preceded by Robert E. Hanson	Tax Commissioner of North Dakota; 1996–2005	Succeeded by Cory Fong
