= 2016 United States House of Representatives election in North Dakota =

2016 United States House of Representatives election in North Dakota's at-large district
- November 8, 2016
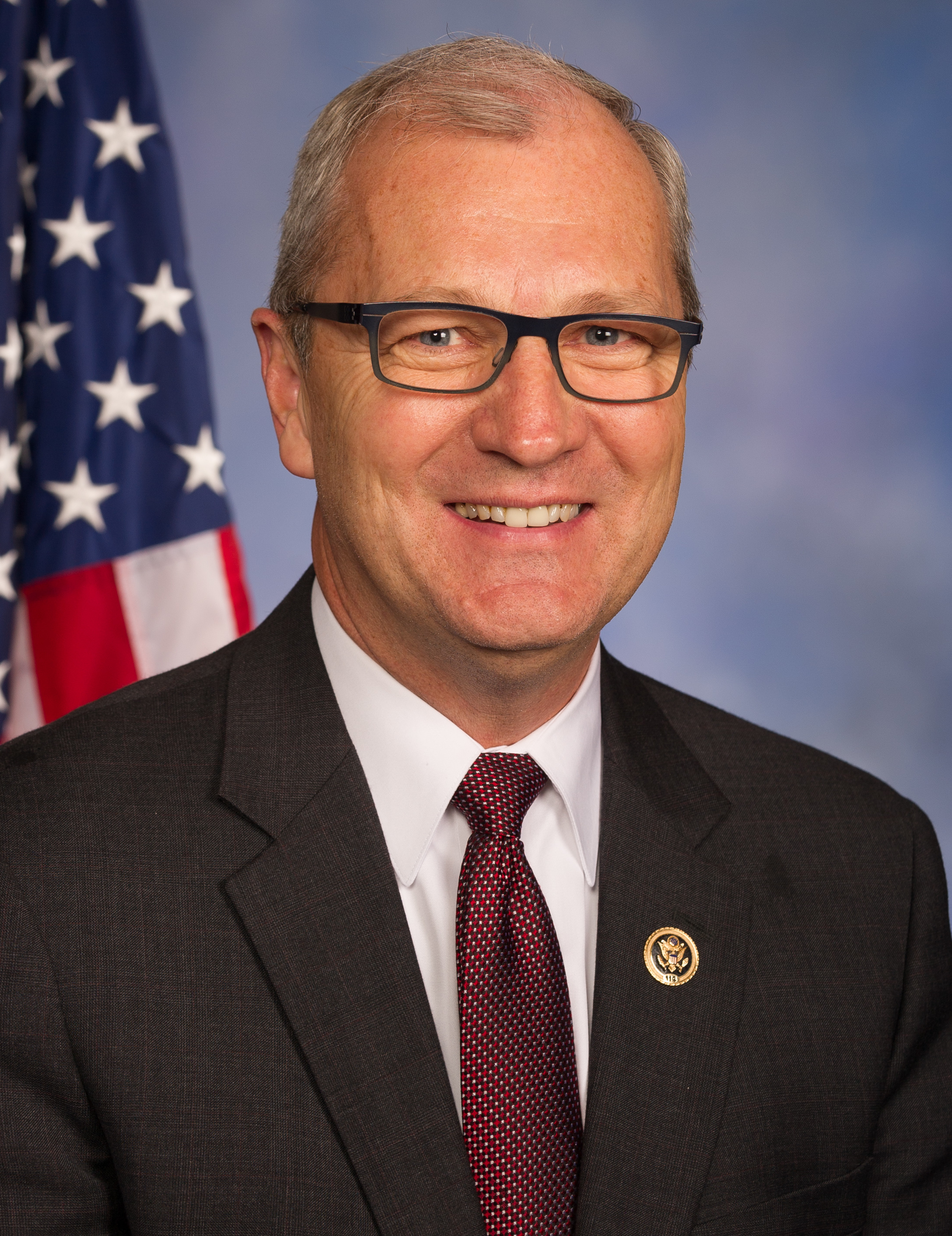

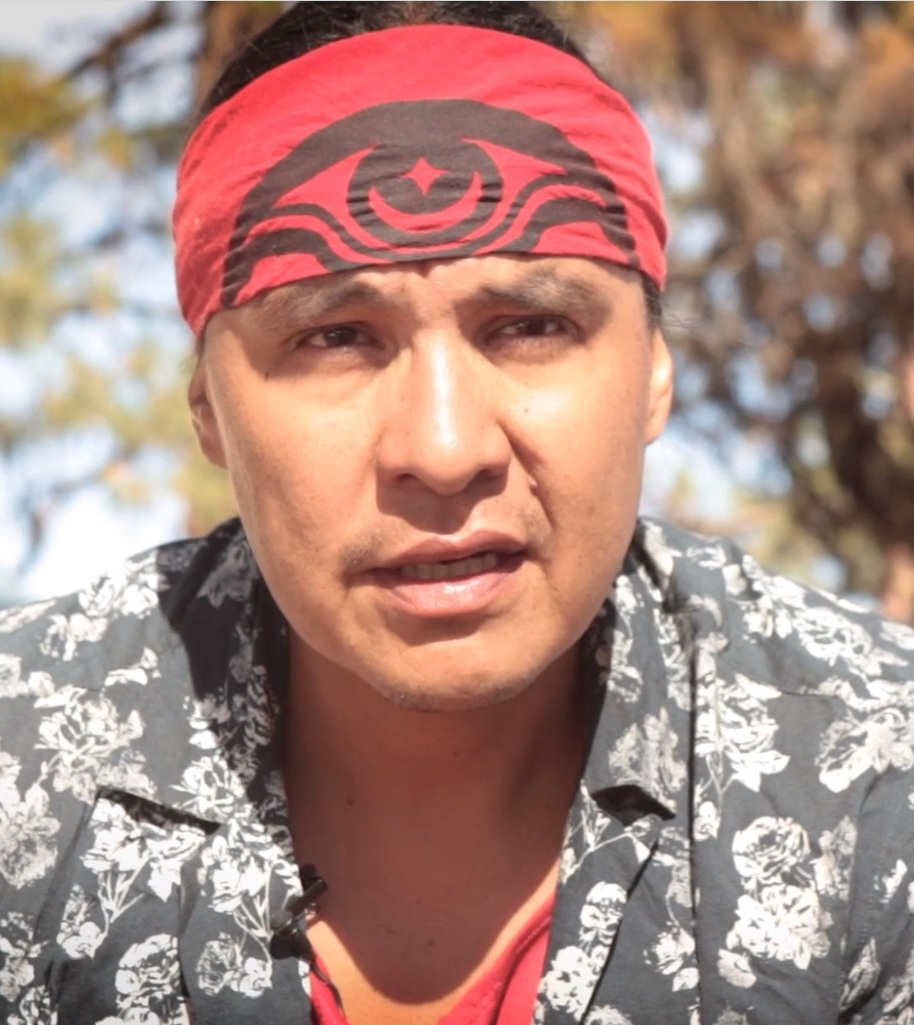

Nominee	Kevin Cramer	Chase Iron Eyes	Jack Seaman
Party	Republican	Democratic–NPL	Libertarian
Popular vote	233,980	80,377	23,528
Percentage	69.13%	23.75%	6.95%
- Cramer: 40–50% 50–60% 60–70% 70–80% 80–90% >90% Iron Eyes: 40–50% 50–60% 60–70% 70–80% 80–90% >90%
U.S. Representative before election
Kevin Cramer
Republican
Elected U.S. Representative
Kevin Cramer
Republican

The 2016 United States House of Representatives election in North Dakota was held on November 8, 2016, to elect the U.S. representative from North Dakota's at-large congressional district. The election coincided with the 2016 U.S. presidential election, the North Dakota Governor election, U.S. Senate election, as well as other statewide, legislative, and local elections. This was first House election since the state legislature changed voter ID requirements, revoking the ability to vote using a student ID.

Incumbent Republican U.S. Representative Kevin Cramer ran for a third term. The primaries were held on June 14.

== Republican primary ==
=== Candidate ===
- Kevin Cramer, incumbent U.S. Representative

=== Results ===
Republican primary results
Party	Candidate	Votes	%
Republican	Kevin Cramer (incumbent)	96,357	99.1
Republican	Write-ins	919	0.9
Total votes		97,276	100.0

== Democratic-NPL primary ==
=== Candidate ===
- Chase Iron Eyes, attorney and American Indian activist

=== Results ===
Democratic primary results
Party	Candidate	Votes	%
Democratic–NPL	Chase Iron Eyes	17,063	99.7
Democratic–NPL	Write-ins	59	0.3
Total votes		17,122	100.0

== Libertarian primary ==
=== Candidate ===
- Robert "Jack" Seaman, businessman, 2014 Libertarian nominee for U.S. Representative from North Dakota

=== Results ===
Libertarian primary results
Party	Candidate	Votes	%
Libertarian	Robert "Jack" Seaman	1,089	99.5
Libertarian	Write-ins	5	0.5
Total votes		1,094	100.0

== General election ==
=== Predictions ===
Source	Ranking	As of
The Cook Political Report	Safe R	November 7, 2016
Daily Kos Elections	Safe R	November 7, 2016
Rothenberg	Safe R	November 3, 2016
Sabato's Crystal Ball	Safe R	November 7, 2016
RCP	Safe R	October 31, 2016

=== Results ===
North Dakota's at-large congressional district, 2016
Party	Candidate	Votes	%	±%
Republican	Kevin Cramer (incumbent)	233,980	69.13%	+13.59%
Democratic–NPL	Chase Iron Eyes	80,377	23.75%	−14.73%
Libertarian	Jack Seaman	23,528	6.95%	+1.11%
n/a	Write-ins	574	0.17%	+0.02%
Total votes		338,459	100.0%	N/A
Republican hold				

==== By county ====
County	Kevin Cramer Republican		Chase Iron Eyes Democratic–NPL		Jack Seaman Libertarian		Write-in		Margin		Total
County	Votes	%	Votes	%	Votes	%	Votes	%	Votes	%	Total
Adams	1,003	82.76%	151	12.46%	58	4.79%	0	0.00%	852	70.30%	1,212
Barnes	3,401	64.36%	1,538	29.11%	337	6.38%	8	0.15%	1,863	35.26%	5,284
Benson	1,053	52.36%	857	42.62%	98	4.87%	3	0.15%	196	9.75%	2,011
Billings	505	84.17%	68	11.33%	25	4.17%	2	0.33%	437	72.83%	600
Bottineau	2,672	77.14%	578	16.69%	214	6.18%	0	0.00%	2,094	60.45%	3,464
Bowman	1,502	84.52%	177	9.96%	97	5.46%	1	0.06	1,325	74.56%	1,777
Burke	910	87.16%	90	8.62%	43	4.12%	1	0.10%	820	78.54%	1,044
Burleigh	34,413	72.57%	9,863	20.80%	3,044	6.42%	100	0.21%	24,550	51.77%	47,420
Cass	45,714	58.14%	25,133	31.97%	7,578	9.64%	197	0.25%	20,581	26.18%	78,622
Cavalier	1,528	76.36%	367	18.34%	102	5.10%	4	0.20%	1,161	58.02%	2,001
Dickey	1,801	74.79%	495	20.56%	110	4.57%	2	0.08%	1,306	54.24%	2,408
Divide	935	76.77%	203	16.67%	79	6.49%	1	0.08%	732	60.10%	1,218
Dunn	1,757	79.47%	375	16.96%	78	3.53%	1	0.05%	1,382	62.51%	2,211
Eddy	826	67.82%	308	25.29%	84	6.90%	0	0.00%	518	42.53%	1,218
Emmons	1,692	85.93%	179	9.09%	94	4.77%	4	0.20%	1,513	76.84%	1,969
Foster	1,339	77.94%	263	15.31%	115	6.69%	1	0.06%	1,076	62.63%	1,718
Golden Valley	811	85.10%	96	10.07%	46	4.83%	0	0.00%	715	75.03%	953
Grand Forks	18,671	63.79%	8,779	30.00%	1,775	6.06%	43	0.15%	9,892	33.80%	29,268
Grant	1,189	85.23%	153	10.97%	50	3.58%	3	0.22%	1,036	74.27%	1,395
Griggs	916	72.24%	283	22.32%	65	5.13%	4	0.32%	633	49.92%	1,268
Hettinger	1,089	85.01%	115	8.98%	77	6.01%	0	0.00%	974	76.03%	1,281
Kidder	1,164	84.59%	152	11.05%	58	4.22%	2	0.15%	1,012	73.55%	1,376
LaMoure	1,578	73.33%	467	21.70%	107	4.97%	0	0.00%	1,111	51.63%	2,152
Logan	929	85.54%	102	9.39%	52	4.79%	3	0.28%	827	76.15%	1,086
McHenry	2,217	78.70%	431	15.30%	164	5.82%	5	0.18%	1,786	63.40%	2,817
McIntosh	1,180	81.27%	205	14.12%	65	4.48%	2	0.14%	975	67.15%	1,452
McKenzie	3,610	78.84%	752	16.42%	207	4.52%	10	0.22%	2,858	62.42%	4,579
McLean	3,973	75.16%	1,048	19.83%	261	4.94%	4	0.08%	2,925	55.33%	5,286
Mercer	3,806	81.88%	632	13.60%	205	4.41%	5	0.11%	3,174	68.29%	4,648
Morton	11,741	75.13%	2,822	18.06%	1,042	6.67%	23	0.15%	8,919	57.07%	15,628
Mountrail	2,570	63.07%	1,334	32.74%	167	4.10%	4	0.10%	1,236	30.33%	4,075
Nelson	1,161	67.30%	437	25.33%	125	7.25%	2	0.12%	724	41.97%	1,725
Oliver	852	83.04%	121	11.79%	52	5.07%	1	0.10%	731	71.25%	1,026
Pembina	2,390	75.73%	575	18.22%	186	5.89%	5	0.16%	1,815	57.51%	3,156
Pierce	1,649	80.09%	318	15.44%	91	4.42%	1	0.05%	1,331	64.64%	2,059
Ramsey	3,696	69.85%	1,222	23.10%	365	6.90%	8	0.15%	2,474	46.76%	5,291
Ransom	1,405	59.99%	769	32.84%	163	6.96%	5	0.21%	636	27.16%	2,342
Renville	1,062	83.42%	147	11.55%	64	5.03%	0	0.00%	915	71.88%	1,273
Richland	4,948	66.18%	1,879	25.13%	645	8.63%	5	0.07%	3,069	41.05%	7,477
Rolette	1,195	31.55%	2,487	65.65%	105	2.77%	1	0.03%	-1,292	-34.11%	3,788
Sargent	1,183	59.24%	643	32.20%	169	8.46%	2	0.10%	540	27.04%	1,997
Sheridan	679	86.39%	77	9.80%	30	3.82%	0	0.00%	602	76.59%	786
Sioux	243	19.57%	973	78.34%	25	2.01%	1	0.08%	-730	-58.78%	1,242
Slope	362	84.58%	41	9.58%	24	5.61%	1	0.23%	321	75.00%	428
Stark	9,921	82.14%	1,453	12.03%	684	5.66%	20	0.17%	8,468	70.11%	12,078
Steele	652	64.17%	282	27.76%	81	7.97%	1	0.10%	370	36.42%	1,016
Stutsman	7,001	71.11%	2,174	22.08%	661	6.71%	9	0.09%	4,827	49.03%	9,845
Towner	828'	71.63%	249	21.54%	79	6.83%	0	0.00%	579	50.09%	1,156
Traill	2,567	65.84%	1,018	26.11%	307	7.87%	7	0.18%	1,549	39.73%	3,899
Walsh	3,469	75.22%	840	18.21%	298	6.46%	5	0.11%	2,629	57.00%	4,612
Ward	20,267	75.13%	4,772	17.69%	1,891	7.01%	47	0.17%	15,495	57.44%	26,977
Wells	1,940	81.82%	317	13.37%	113	4.77%	1	0.04%	1,623	68.45%	2,371
Williams	10,015	80.29%	1,567	12.56%	873	7.00%	19	0.15%	8,448	67.72%	12,474

===== Counties that flipped from Democratic to Republican =====
- Benson (largest CDP: Fort Totten)
- Nelson (largest city: Lakota)
- Ransom (largest city: Lisbon)
- Sargent (largest city: Gwinner)
- Steele (largest city: Finley)
- Traill (largest city: Mayville)

== See also ==
- United States House of Representatives elections, 2016
