= 2010 United States House of Representatives election in North Dakota =

- November 2, 2010
- Turnout: 237,137
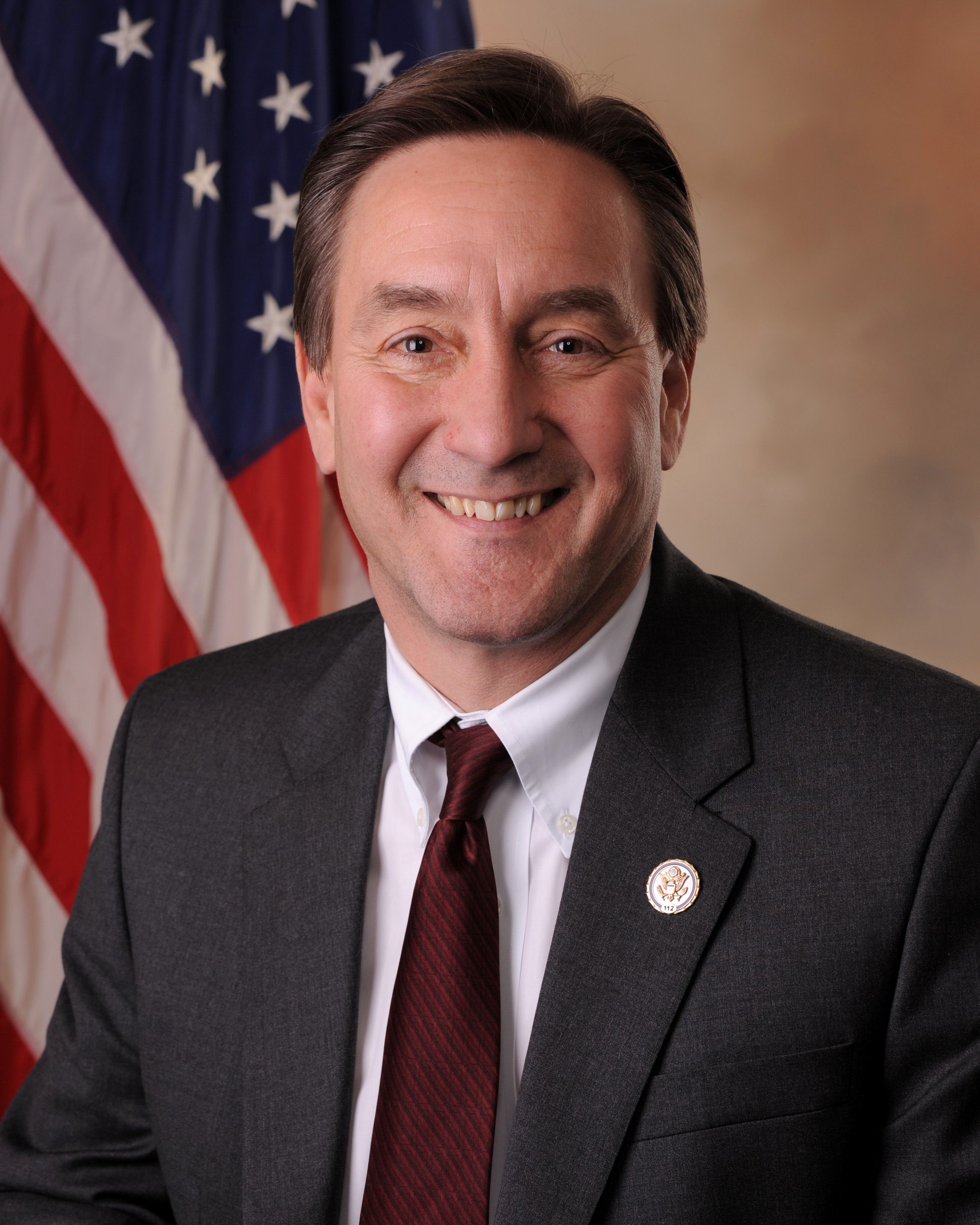

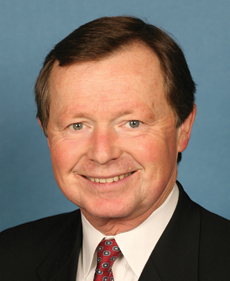
Nominee	Rick Berg	Earl Pomeroy
Party	Republican	Democratic–NPL
Popular vote	129,802	106,542
Percentage	54.74%	44.93%
- County results Berg: 50–60% 60–70% 70–80% Pomeroy: 50–60% 60–70% 70–80%
U.S. Representative before election
Earl Pomeroy
Democratic–NPL
Elected U.S. Representative
Rick Berg
Republican

The 2010 House election in North Dakota took place on November 2, 2010, to elect the state's at-large Representative to the United States House of Representatives. Representatives are elected for two-year terms; this election was for the 112th Congress from January 3, 2011, until January 3, 2013. North Dakota has one seat in the House, apportioned according to the 2000 United States census.

The election was held concurrently with the United States Senate elections of 2010 (including one in North Dakota), the United States House elections in other states and various state and local elections.

== Background ==
Despite Republican dominance at the presidential level in North Dakota, which has not voted for a Democratic presidential candidate since 1964, as well as state and local elections, Democrats achieved several consecutive victories in congressional elections in the state since the 1980s. Democrats had held the state's at-large House seat since 1981. From 1987 to 2011, North Dakota had a completely Democratic congressional delegation.

Since his first election in 1992, incumbent Democrat Earl Pomeroy had usually won reelection by comfortable margins. However, with Democrats fighting in a much tougher political environment in 2010, Republicans planned on putting forward a serious challenge. Republicans running against him included state Public Service Commissioner Kevin Cramer, state Representative Rick Berg, and former University of Mary football coach Paul Schaffner. Pomeroy was likely more vulnerable than usual due to his support for the Democratic House Healthcare bill, which 64% of North Dakotans opposed, and President Barack Obama's declining job approval ratings in the state.

== General election ==
=== Candidates ===
==== Democrats ====
- Earl Pomeroy, incumbent U.S. Representative

==== Republicans ====
- Rick Berg, North Dakota State Representative and former state House Majority Leader
- J.D. Donaghe, oil field consultant

=== Polling ===
Poll source	Date(s)dministered	Earl Pomeroy (D)	Rick Berg (R)	Other	Undecided
Public Opinion Strategies†	October 24–25, 2010	42%	51%	-	-
Rasmussen Reports	October 18–19, 2010	42%	52%	1%	5%
The Hill/ANGA	October 16–19, 2010	45%	44%	-	9%
Prairie Poll	October 2010	44%	34%	-	-
Rasmussen Reports	September 20–21, 2010	45%	48%	1%	5%
Garin-Hart-Yang†	September 10–12, 2010	46%	44%	-	-
Rasmussen Reports	August 10–11, 2010	44%	53%	1%	3%
Rasmussen Reports	July 21, 2010	46%	49%	1%	5%
Rasmussen Reports	June 15–16, 2010	44%	51%	1%	5%
Rasmussen Reports	May 19, 2010	43%	52%	2%	3%
Rasmussen Reports	April 20, 2010	45%	49%	2%	4%
Rasmussen Reports	March 23–24, 2010	44%	51%	1%	4%
Rasmussen Reports	February 9–10, 2010	40%	46%	3%	11%

†Internal poll (Garin-Hart-Yang for Pomeroy and Public Opinion Strategies for Berg)

=== Predictions ===
Source	Ranking	As of
The Cook Political Report	Tossup	November 1, 2010
Rothenberg	Tilt R (flip)	November 1, 2010
Sabato's Crystal Ball	Lean R (flip)	November 1, 2010
RCP	Lean R (flip)	November 1, 2010
CQ Politics	Tossup	October 28, 2010
New York Times	Tossup	November 1, 2010
FiveThirtyEight	Likely R (flip)	November 1, 2010

=== Results ===
In the general election, Berg unseated Pomeroy by a vote of 129,802 (55%) to 106,542 (45%), becoming the first Republican since 1981 to represent North Dakota in the U.S. House of Representatives.

North Dakota's at-large congressional district election, 2010
Party	Candidate	Votes	%
Republican	Rick Berg	129,802	54.74
Democratic–NPL	Earl Pomeroy (incumbent)	106,542	44.93
Write-in		793	0.33
Total votes		237,137	100.00
Republican gain from Democratic–NPL			

==== Counties that flipped from Democratic to Republican ====
- Adams (largest city: Hettinger)
- Cass (largest city: Fargo)
- Bottineau (largest city: Bottineau)
- Burke (largest city: Powers Lake)
- Burleigh (largest city: Bismarck)
- Dickey (largest city: Oakes)
- Divide (largest city: Crosby)
- Foster (largest city: Carrington)
- Grant (largest city: Elgin)
- Griggs (largest city: Cooperstown)
- Hettinger (largest city: Mott)
- Kidder (largest city: Steele)
- LaMoure (largest city: LaMoure)
- Logan (largest city: Napoleon)
- McHenry (largest city: Velva)
- McIntosh (largest city: Wishek)
- McKenzie (largest city: Watford City)
- McLean (largest city: Garrison)
- Mercer (largest city: Beulah)
- Morton (largest city: Mandan)
- Pembina (largest city: Cavalier)
- Pierce (largest city: Rugby)
- Renville (largest city: Mohall)
- Richland (largest city: Wahpeton)
- Stark (largest city: Dickinson)
- Stutsman (largest city: Jamestown)
- Walsh (largest city: Grafton)
- Ward (largest city: Minot)
- Wells (largest city: Harvey)
- Williams (largest city: Williston)

== See also ==
- North Dakota's at-large congressional district
