= 2004 United States House of Representatives election in North Dakota =

- November 2, 2004
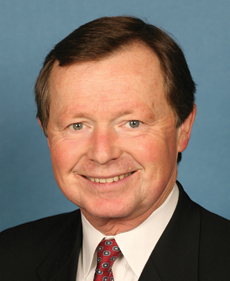

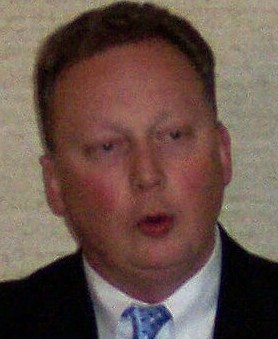
Nominee	Earl Pomeroy	Duane Sand
Party	Democratic–NPL	Republican
Popular vote	185,130	125,684
Percentage	59.56%	40.44%
- County results Pomeroy: 50–60% 60–70% 70–80% 80–90% Sand: 50–60%
U.S. Representative before election
Earl Pomeroy
Democratic–NPL
Elected U.S. Representative
Earl Pomeroy
Democratic–NPL

The 2004 U.S. House of Representatives election for the state of North Dakota's at-large congressional district was held November 2, 2004. The incumbent, Democratic-NPL Congressman Earl Pomeroy was re-elected to his seventh term, defeating Republican candidate Duane Sand.

Only Pomeroy filed as a Dem-NPLer, and the endorsed Republican candidate was Duane Sand, who had previously faced Democrat Kent Conrad in 2000 for North Dakota's Senate seat (see election). Pomeroy and Sand won the primary elections for their respective parties.

Although Sand ran an aggressive campaign, it was not as aggressive as that of Rick Clayburgh who had faced the congressman in the previous election. On June 26, U.S. House Majority Leader Tom DeLay visited Fargo, North Dakota, to campaign for Sand.

== General election ==
=== Predictions ===
Source	Ranking	As of
The Cook Political Report	Lean D	October 29, 2004
Sabato's Crystal Ball	Safe D	November 1, 2004

=== Results ===
2004 United States House of Representatives election in North Dakota
Party	Candidate	Votes	%
Democratic–NPL	Earl Pomeroy (incumbent)	185,130	59.56
Republican	Duane Sand	125,684	40.44
Total votes		310,814	100.00
Democratic–NPL hold			

=== Counties that flipped from Republican to Democratic ===
- Adams (largest city: Hettinger)
- Burleigh (largest city: Bismarck)
- Dickey (largest city: Oakes)
- Grant (largest city: Elgin)
- Hettinger (largest city: Mott)
- Kidder (largest city: Steele)
- LaMoure (largest city: LaMoure)
- Logan (largest city: Napoleon)
- McIntosh (largest city: Wishek)
- Mercer (largest city: Beulah)
- Morton (largest city: Mandan)
- Wells (largest city: Harvey)
