= 2008 United States House of Representatives election in North Dakota =

- November 4, 2008
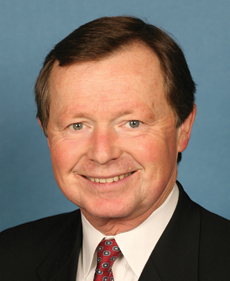

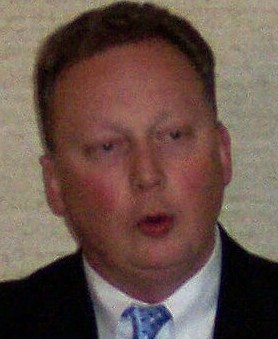
Nominee	Earl Pomeroy	Duane Sand
Party	Democratic–NPL	Republican
Popular vote	194,577	119,388
Percentage	61.97%	38.03%
- Pomeroy: 50–60% 60–70% 70–80% 80–90% >90% Sand: 50–60% 60–70% 70–80% Tie: 50%
U.S. Representative before election
Earl Pomeroy
Democratic–NPL
Elected U.S. Representative
Earl Pomeroy
Democratic–NPL

The 2008 election for North Dakota's at-large congressional district took place on November 4, 2008. The incumbent, Democratic-NPL Congressman Earl Pomeroy, was re-elected to his ninth term. Republican Duane Sand formally announced that he was running on March 20, 2008. He previously challenged Pomeroy in 2004.

Initial speculation for a Republican challenger included North Dakota Governor John Hoeven and Attorney General Wayne Stenehjem, who were enjoying very high approval ratings throughout their terms of office. State Representative Kim Koppelman and State House Majority Leader Rick Berg ruled themselves out of the running on February 20, 2008, Another possible challenger was Brian Kalk, who decided to run for Public Service Commissioner and was successful in the November election.

As of 2026, this is the last time that the Democratic-NPL won North Dakota's House seat. Sand later ran in North Dakota's 2012 U.S. Senate race and lost the Republican primary.

== General election ==
=== Predictions ===
Source	Ranking	As of
The Cook Political Report	Safe D	November 6, 2008
Rothenberg	Safe D	November 2, 2008
Sabato's Crystal Ball	Safe D	November 6, 2008
Real Clear Politics	Safe D	November 7, 2008
CQ Politics	Safe D	November 6, 2008

=== Results ===
North Dakota's at-large congressional district election, 2008
Party	Candidate	Votes	%
Democratic–NPL	Earl Pomeroy (incumbent)	194,577	61.97
Republican	Duane Sand	119,388	38.03
Total votes		313,965	100.00
Democratic–NPL hold			

==== Counties that flipped from Democratic to Republican ====
- Bowman (largest city: Bowman)
- Dunn (largest city: Killdeer)
- Emmons (largest city: Linton)
- Golden Valley (largest city: Beach)
- Oliver (largest city: Center)
- Sheridan (largest city: McClusky)
- Slope (largest city: Marmarth)
