= 2006 United States House of Representatives election in North Dakota =

- November 7, 2006
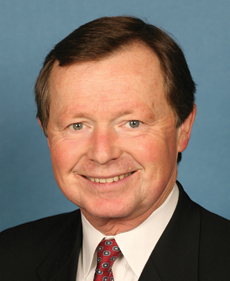

Nominee	Earl Pomeroy	Matt Mechtel
Party	Democratic–NPL	Republican
Popular vote	142,934	74,687
Percentage	65.68%	34.32%
- County results Pomeroy: 50–60% 60–70% 70–80% 80–90% Mechtel: 50–60%
U.S. Representative before election
Earl Pomeroy
Democratic–NPL
Elected U.S. Representative
Earl Pomeroy
Democratic–NPL

The 2006 U.S. House of Representatives election for the state of North Dakota's at-large congressional district was held November 7, 2006. The incumbent, Democratic-NPL Congressman Earl Pomeroy was re-elected to his eighth term, defeating Republican candidate Matt Mechtel.

Only Pomeroy filed as a Dem-NPLer, and the endorsed Republican candidate was Matt Mechtel of Fargo, North Dakota. Pomeroy and Mechtel won the primary elections for their respective parties.

Pomeroy increased his margin over his opposition for the third year in a row since 2002. This was because Mechtel was not known well throughout the state, and that the Republican Party itself was beginning to slump.

== General election ==
=== Predictions ===
Source	Ranking	As of
The Cook Political Report	Safe D	November 6, 2006
Rothenberg	Safe D	November 6, 2006
Sabato's Crystal Ball	Safe D	November 6, 2006
Real Clear Politics	Safe D	November 7, 2006
CQ Politics	Safe D	November 7, 2006

=== Results ===
North Dakota's at-large congressional district election, 2006
Party	Candidate	Votes	%
Democratic–NPL	Earl Pomeroy (incumbent)	142,934	65.68
Republican	Matt Mechtel	74,687	34.32
Total votes		217,621	100.00
Democratic–NPL hold			

=== Counties that flipped from Republican to Democratic ===
- Bowman (largest city: Bowman)
- Dunn (largest city: Killdeer)
- Emmons (largest city: Linton)
- Golden Valley (largest city: Beach)
- Oliver (largest city: Center)
- Sheridan (largest city: McClusky)
- Slope (largest city: Marmarth)
