= 2002 United States House of Representatives election in North Dakota =

- November 5, 2002
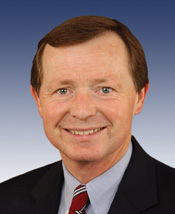

Candidate	Earl Pomeroy	Rick Clayburgh
Party	Democratic–NPL	Republican
Popular vote	121,073	109,957
Percentage	52.41%	47.59%
- County results Pomeroy: 50–60% 60–70% 70–80% Clayburgh: 50–60% 60–70%
U.S. Representative before election
Earl Pomeroy
Democratic–NPL
Elected U.S. Representative
Earl Pomeroy
Democratic–NPL

The 2002 U.S. House of Representatives election for the state of North Dakota's at-large congressional district was held November 5, 2002. The incumbent, Democratic-NPL Congressman Earl Pomeroy was re-elected to his sixth term, defeating Republican candidate Rick Clayburgh.

Only Pomeroy filed as a Dem-NPLer, and the endorsed Republican candidate was Rick Clayburgh, who was serving as the North Dakota State Tax Commissioner. Pomeroy and Clayburgh won the primary elections for their respective parties.

The election was the closest for Pomeroy in all of his career as congressman until his defeat in 2010; he won by just over 11,000 votes. This was because Clayburgh ran an aggressive campaign, and was the most well-known candidate ever to face Pomeroy; he had held a statewide office for 8 years. United States Vice President Dick Cheney campaigned for Clayburgh in Fargo, North Dakota, on July 29.

== General election ==
=== Predictions ===
Source	Ranking	As of
Sabato's Crystal Ball	Lean D	November 4, 2002
New York Times	Lean D	October 14, 2002

=== Results ===
North Dakota's at-large congressional district election, 2002
Party	Candidate	Votes	%
Democratic–NPL	Earl Pomeroy (incumbent)	121,073	52.41
Republican	Rick Clayburgh	109,957	47.59
Total votes		231,030	100.00
Democratic–NPL hold			

==== Counties that flipped from Democratic to Republican ====
- Adams (largest city: Hettinger)
- Dunn (largest city: Killdeer)
- Hettinger (largest city: Mott)
- LaMoure (largest city: LaMoure)
- Morton (largest city: Mandan)

==== Counties that flipped from Republican to Democratic ====
- McKenzie (largest city: Watford City)
- Pierce (largest city: Rugby)
