= 2000 United States House of Representatives election in North Dakota =

- November 7, 2000
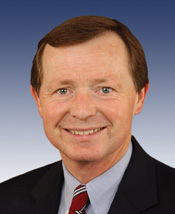

Candidate	Earl Pomeroy	John Dorso
Party	Democratic–NPL	Republican
Popular vote	151,173	127,251
Percentage	52.92%	44.55%
- County results Pomeroy: 40–50% 50–60% 60–70% 70–80% Dorso: 40–50% 50–60% 60–70%
U.S. Representative before election
Earl Pomeroy
Democratic–NPL
Elected U.S. Representative
Earl Pomeroy
Democratic–NPL

The 2000 U.S. House of Representatives election for the state of North Dakota's at-large congressional district was held November 7, 2000. The incumbent, Democratic-NPL Congressman Earl Pomeroy was re-elected to his fifth term, defeating Republican candidate John Dorso.

Only Pomeroy filed as a Dem-NPLer, and the endorsed Republican candidate was John Dorso, who was serving as the North Dakota House Majority Leader. Pomeroy and Dorso won the primary elections for their respective parties.

While the election was the closest for Pomeroy since 1994, Dorso was unable to defeat the four-term congressman. Dorso's father, Carmen Dorso, died during the campaign from leukemia.

Two independent candidates, Jan Shelver and Kenneth R. Loughead, also sought the seat, but had little impact on the result. Loughead had previously sought the seat in 1998 and 1996.

== Results ==
North Dakota's at-large congressional district election, 2000
Party	Candidate	Votes	%
Democratic–NPL	Earl Pomeroy (incumbent)	151,173	52.92
Republican	John Dorso	127,251	44.55
Independent	Jan Shelver	4,731	1.66
Independent	Kenneth R. Loughead	2,481	0.87
Write-in		22	0.01
Total votes		285,658	100.00
Democratic–NPL hold			
