= Earl Pomeroy =

American politician (born 1952)

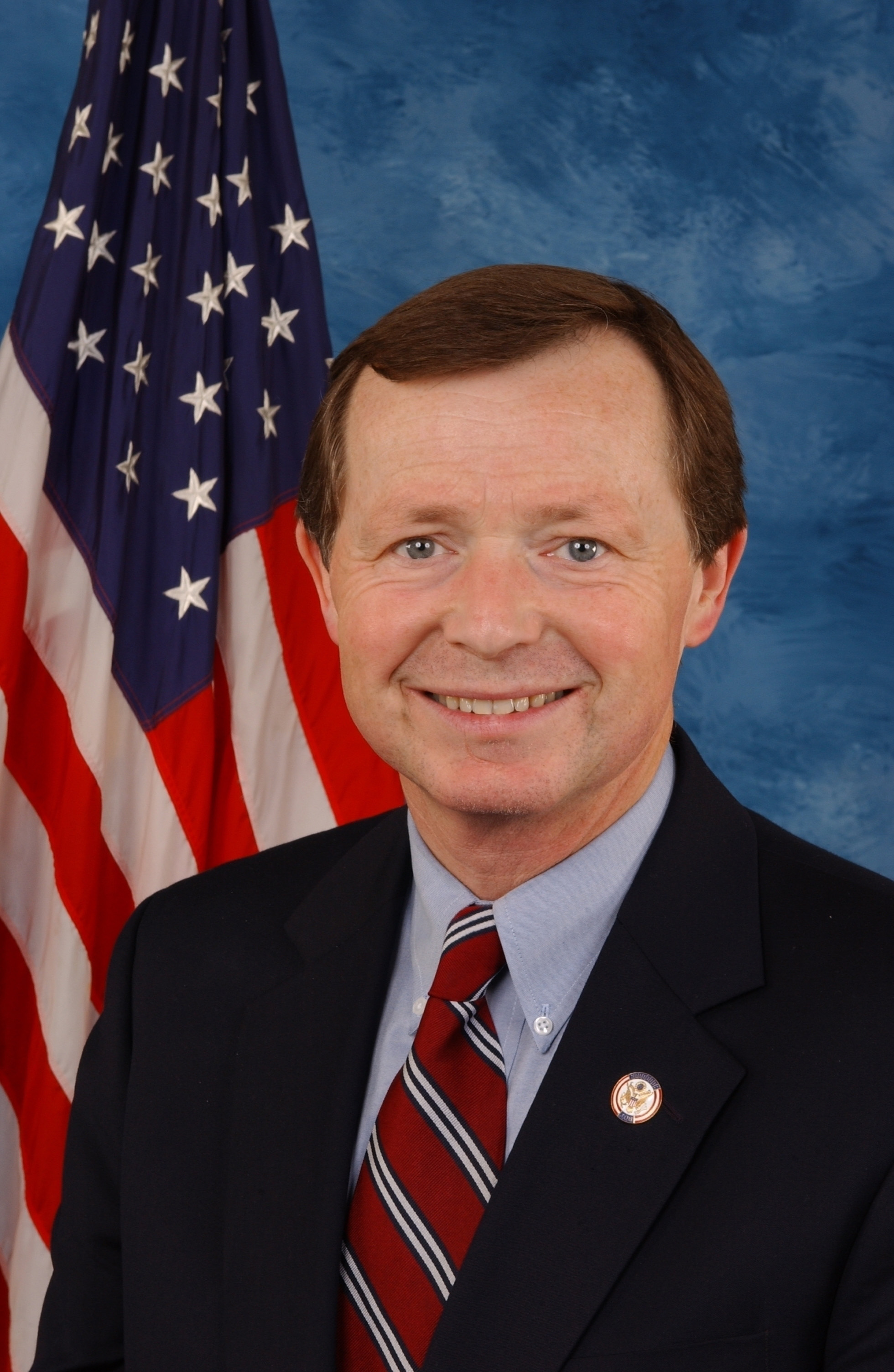

Member of the U.S. House of Representatives from North Dakota's at-large district
- In office January 3, 1993 – January 3, 2011
- Preceded by: Byron Dorgan
- Succeeded by: Rick Berg

Insurance Commissioner of North Dakota
- In office January 1, 1985 – December 15, 1992
- Governor: George Sinner
- Preceded by: Jorris Wigen
- Succeeded by: Glenn Pomeroy

Personal details
- Born: Earl Ralph Pomeroy III; September 2, 1952 (age 74) Valley City, North Dakota, U.S.
- Party: Democratic
- Spouse: Mary Berglund
- Children: 2
- Education: Valley City State University; University of North Dakota (BA, JD)
- Pomeroy's voice Pomeroing honors Terry DeVine, a deceased North Dakota journalist. Recorded July 15, 2008

Earl Ralph Pomeroy III (born September 2, 1952) is an American lawyer and politician who served as the U.S. representative for North Dakota's at-large congressional district from 1993 to 2011. He is a member of the North Dakota Democratic-NPL Party. He currently serves as senior counsel for the Washington, D.C. branch of Alston & Bird.

As of 2026, he is the last Democrat to have represented North Dakota in the U.S. House of Representatives.

== Early life, education and career ==
Pomeroy was born in Valley City in Barnes County in eastern North Dakota. He attended Valley City State University where he was initiated as a member of Tau Kappa Epsilon fraternity and later transferred to the University of North Dakota at Grand Forks, where he earned a Bachelor of Arts degree in political science and went on to do graduate research in legal history at Durham University in England. Pomeroy returned to North Dakota to attend the University of North Dakota School of Law, having received his Juris Doctor in 1979. In 2011, he received an honorary Doctor of Letters degree from the University of North Dakota.

== State government ==
Pomeroy was elected to the North Dakota House of Representatives in 1980, and became North Dakota Insurance Commissioner in 1985, a post that he held until 1992.

== U.S. House of Representatives ==
=== Committee assignments ===
- Committee on Agriculture
  - Subcommittee on Conservation, Credit, Energy, and Research
  - Subcommittee on General Farm Commodities and Risk Management
- Committee on Ways and Means
  - Subcommittee on Trade
  - Subcommittee on Health
  - Subcommittee on Social Security (Chair)

=== Caucuses and coalitions ===
- Co-chair of the bipartisan Rural Health Care Coalition

Pomeroy was a member of the Blue Dog Coalition.

== Political positions ==
=== Iraq War ===
Although he supported authorizing force in Iraq in 2002, he later increasingly spoke out against the war. Earl Pomeroy supported the House resolution opposing George W. Bush's troop surge plan in February 2007. He said in a floor speech, "We take care of our soldiers over [in Iraq] by making sure their deployments are only for acceptable periods and at acceptable intervals, with enough time at home in between to heal, to rest, and to train. But beyond these things, we take care of our soldiers over there when we as a Congress make certain the mission they have sent to perform has a reasonable chance of success.

"In a war where so many tragic mistakes have been made, this Congress must not sit quietly by while additional plans are cooked up in Washington whose only certainty is to accelerate the loss of American lives, compound the already severe strain on our military capabilities, and accelerate the burn rate of American dollars spent in Iraq. ... Without the commitment between the warring parties in Iraq to stop the killing, and create a political agreement upon which a national government can exist, 20,000 more U.S. soldiers are not likely to bring about a lasting peace."

=== Health care ===
Pomeroy voted for the Affordable Health Care for America Act in November 2009, stating that the bill was far from perfect, "but so is our present system."

=== Adoption tax credit ===
Pomeroy strongly supported legislation allowing parents to deduct adoption expenses they incurred. On the day of the vote, Pomeroy brought his daughter whom he and his wife had adopted from South Korea, onto the House floor.

== Political campaigns ==
Pomeroy was first elected to the U.S. House of Representatives in 1992. For his first five campaigns, he did not gain the victory margins scored by North Dakota's two Democratic Senators, Kent Conrad and Byron Dorgan. Until 2004, he never won more than 57 percent of the vote. However, in 2004 he was reelected with almost 60 percent.

=== 2006 ===
Pomeroy faced Republican Matthew Mechtel in the 2006 general election, easily winning re-election to his eighth term. He received a larger percentage of votes (65.68%) than in his previous elections.

=== 2008 ===
In 2008, Pomeroy easily retained his seat in the House of Representatives defeating Republican Duane Sand.

=== 2010 ===
Pomeroy was defeated by Republican nominee state Representative Rick Berg. That marked the first time in 30 years that this seat would be held by a Republican.

Pomeroy's election loss was attributed to his vote for the health care reform bill.

== Post-Congressional career ==
After leaving Congress, Pomeroy joined the K Street firm Alston & Bird, where he works as a lobbyist for hospitals. Pomeroy's move to the private sector was "unusually swift"; by June 2011, he had registered as a lobbyist. Pomeroy joined former Senate Majority Leader and presidential candidate Bob Dole at Alston & Bird.

== Personal life ==
Pomeroy is a Presbyterian. He has two children, Kathryn and Scott. On July 2, 2009, Pomeroy married Mary Berglund in a private ceremony at the site of his family's homestead in Valley City, North Dakota.

Pomeroy was a charter member of the rugby club at UND. He played rugby previously at Grey College at Durham University where he was working on a master's degree.

== See also ==
- United States House of Representatives election in North Dakota, 2004
- United States House of Representatives election in North Dakota, 2002
- United States House of Representatives election in North Dakota, 2000

Party political offices
Preceded by Byron Knutson	Democratic nominee for Insurance Commissioner of North Dakota; 1984, 1988	Succeeded by Glenn Pomeroy
Political offices
Preceded by Jorris Wigen	Insurance Commissioner of North Dakota; 1985–1992	Succeeded by Glenn Pomeroy
U.S. House of Representatives
Preceded by Byron Dorgan	Member of the U.S. House of Representatives from North Dakota's at-large congressional district 1993–2011	Succeeded by Rick Berg
U.S. order of precedence (ceremonial)
Preceded by Doug Lamborn as Former U.S. Representative	Order of precedence of the United States as Former U.S. Representative	Succeeded by Rob Bishop as Former U.S. Representative
