= List of United States representatives from North Dakota =

The following is an alphabetical list of United States representatives from the state of North Dakota. For chronological tables of members of both houses of the United States Congress from the state (through the present day), see North Dakota's congressional delegations. The list of names should be complete (as of January 3, 2025), but other data may be incomplete. It includes members who have represented only the state, both past and present, as the Dakota Territory encompassed in addition South Dakota, and parts of present-day Wyoming, Montana, and Idaho.

== Current member ==
Updated January 3, 2025.

- North Dakota's at-large district: Julie Fedorchak (R) (since 2025)

== List of members ==
Member	Party	Years	District	Notes
Fred G. Aandahl	Republican	January 3, 1951 – January 3, 1953	At-large	Elected in 1950. Retired to run for U.S. senator.
Mark Andrews	Republican	October 30, 1963 – January 3, 1973	1st	Elected in 1963 to finish Nygaard's term. Retired to run for U.S. senator.
Mark Andrews	Republican	January 3, 1973 – January 3, 1981	At-large	Elected in 1963 to finish Nygaard's term. Retired to run for U.S. senator.
Kelly Armstrong	Republican	January 3, 2019 – December 14, 2024	At-large	Elected in 2018. Resigned when elected governor of North Dakota.
John M. Baer	Nonpartisan League	August 10, 1917 – March 3, 1921	1st	Elected in 1917 to finish Helgesen's term. Lost re-election to Burtness.
Rick Berg	Republican	January 3, 2011 – January 3, 2013	At-large	Elected in 2010. Retired to run for U.S. Senate.
Quentin N. Burdick	Democratic-NPL	January 3, 1959 – August 8, 1960	At-large	Elected in 1958. Resigned when elected U.S. senator.
Usher L. Burdick	Republican	January 3, 1935 – January 3, 1945	At-large	Elected in 1934. Retired to run for U.S. senator.
Usher L. Burdick	Republican	January 3, 1949 – January 3, 1959	At-large	Elected in 1948. Retired.
Olger B. Burtness	Republican	March 4, 1921 – March 3, 1933	1st	Elected in 1920. Lost re-nomination to Lemke.
Kevin Cramer	Republican	January 3, 2013 – January 3, 2019	At-large	Elected in 2012. Retired to run for U.S. senator.
Byron Dorgan	Democratic-NPL	January 3, 1981 – December 14, 1992	At-large	Elected in 1980. Resigned when appointed U.S. senator.
Julie Fedorchak	Republican	January 3, 2025 – present	At-large	Elected in 2024. Incumbent.
Asle Gronna	Republican	March 4, 1905 – February 11, 1911	At-large	Elected in 1904. Resigned when elected U.S. senator.
Thomas Hall	Republican	November 4, 1924 – March 3, 1933	2nd	Elected in 1924 to finish Young's term. Seat redistricted and lost re-nomination.
Louis B. Hanna	Republican	March 4, 1909 – January 7, 1913	At-large	Elected in 1908. Resigned when elected Governor of North Dakota.
Henry C. Hansbrough	Republican	November 2, 1889 – March 3, 1891	At-large	Elected in 1889. Retired to run for U.S. senator.
Henry Thomas Helgesen	Republican	March 4, 1911 – March 3, 1913	At-large	Elected in 1910. Died.
Henry Thomas Helgesen	Republican	March 4, 1913 – April 10, 1917	1st	Elected in 1910. Died.
Martin N. Johnson	Republican	March 4, 1891 – March 3, 1899	At-large	Elected in 1890. Retired to run for U.S. senator.
Thomas S. Kleppe	Republican	January 3, 1967 – January 3, 1971	2nd	Elected in 1966. Lost re-election to Link.
Otto Krueger	Republican	January 3, 1953 – January 3, 1959	At-large	Elected in 1952. Retired.
William Lemke	Nonpartisan League	March 4, 1933 – January 3, 1941	At-large	Elected in 1932. Retired to run for U.S. senator.
William Lemke	Republican	January 3, 1943 – May 30, 1950	At-large	Elected in 1942. Died.
Arthur A. Link	Democratic-NPL	January 3, 1971 – January 3, 1973	2nd	Elected in 1970. Re-districted and elected governor.
Thomas Frank Marshall	Republican	March 4, 1901 – March 3, 1909	At-large	Elected in 1900. Retired to run for U.S. senator.
Patrick Daniel Norton	Republican	March 4, 1913 – March 3, 1919	3rd	Elected in 1912. Retired.
Hjalmar C. Nygaard	Republican	January 3, 1961 – January 3, 1963	At-large	Elected in 1960. Died.
Hjalmar C. Nygaard	Republican	January 3, 1963 – July 18, 1963	1st	Elected in 1960. Died.
Earl Pomeroy	Democratic-NPL	January 3, 1993 – January 3, 2011	At-large	Elected in 1992. Lost re-election to Berg.
Rolland W. Redlin	Democratic-NPL	January 3, 1965 – January 3, 1967	2nd	Elected in 1964. Lost re-election to Kleppe.
Charles R. Robertson	Republican	January 3, 1941 – January 3, 1943	At-large	Elected in 1940. Lost re-nomination to Lemke.
Charles R. Robertson	Republican	January 3, 1945 – January 3, 1949	At-large	Elected in 1944. Lost re-nomination to Burdick.
Don L. Short	Republican	January 3, 1959 – January 3, 1963	At-large	Elected in 1958. Lost re-election to Redlin.
Don L. Short	Republican	January 3, 1963 – January 3, 1965	2nd	Elected in 1958. Lost re-election to Redlin.
James H. Sinclair	Republican	March 4, 1919 – March 3, 1933	3rd	Elected in 1918. Lost re-nomination to Burdick.
James H. Sinclair	Republican	March 4, 1933 – March 3, 1935	At-large	Elected in 1918. Lost re-nomination to Burdick.
Burleigh F. Spalding	Republican	March 4, 1899 – March 3, 1901	At-large	Elected in 1898. Retired.
Burleigh F. Spalding	Republican	March 4, 1903 – March 3, 1905	At-large	Elected in 1902. Lost re-nomination to Gronna.
George M. Young	Republican	March 4, 1913 – September 2, 1924	2nd	Elected in 1912. Resigned when appointed to the US Customs Court.

== See also ==
- List of United States senators from North Dakota
- North Dakota's congressional delegations
- North Dakota's congressional districts
