= North Dakota's congressional delegations =

North Dakota was admitted to the Union on November 2, 1889.

The current dean of the North Dakota delegation is Senator John Hoeven, having served in the Senate since 2011.

== United States Senate ==
Current U.S. senators from North Dakota
North Dakota CPVI (2025): R+18	Class I senator	Class III senator
North Dakota CPVI (2025): R+18	Kevin Cramer (Junior senator) (Bismarck)	John Hoeven (Senior senator) (Bismarck)
Party	Republican	Republican
Incumbent since	January 3, 2019	January 3, 2011

Class I senators	Congress	Class III senators
Lyman R. Casey (R)	51st (1889–1891)	Gilbert A. Pierce (R)
Lyman R. Casey (R)	52nd (1891–1893)	Henry C. Hansbrough (R)
William N. Roach (D)	53rd (1893–1895)	Henry C. Hansbrough (R)
William N. Roach (D)	54th (1895–1897)	Henry C. Hansbrough (R)
William N. Roach (D)	55th (1897–1899)	Henry C. Hansbrough (R)
Porter J. McCumber (R)	56th (1899–1901)	Henry C. Hansbrough (R)
Porter J. McCumber (R)	57th (1901–1903)	Henry C. Hansbrough (R)
Porter J. McCumber (R)	58th (1903–1905)	Henry C. Hansbrough (R)
Porter J. McCumber (R)	59th (1905–1907)	Henry C. Hansbrough (R)
Porter J. McCumber (R)	60th (1907–1909)	Henry C. Hansbrough (R)
Porter J. McCumber (R)	61st (1909–1911)	Martin N. Johnson (R)
Porter J. McCumber (R)	61st (1909–1911)	Fountain Thompson (D)
Porter J. McCumber (R)	61st (1909–1911)	William E. Purcell (D)
Porter J. McCumber (R)	61st (1909–1911)	Asle Gronna (R)
Porter J. McCumber (R)	62nd (1911–1913)	Asle Gronna (R)
Porter J. McCumber (R)	63rd (1913–1915)	Asle Gronna (R)
Porter J. McCumber (R)	64th (1915–1917)	Asle Gronna (R)
Porter J. McCumber (R)	65th (1917–1919)	Asle Gronna (R)
Porter J. McCumber (R)	66th (1919–1921)	Asle Gronna (R)
Porter J. McCumber (R)	67th (1921–1923)	Edwin F. Ladd (R)
Lynn Frazier (R-NPL)	68th (1923–1925)	Edwin F. Ladd (R)
Lynn Frazier (R-NPL)	69th (1925–1927)	Edwin F. Ladd (R)
Lynn Frazier (R-NPL)	69th (1925–1927)	Gerald Nye (R-NPL)
Lynn Frazier (R-NPL)	70th (1927–1929)	Gerald Nye (R-NPL)
Lynn Frazier (R-NPL)	71st (1929–1931)	Gerald Nye (R-NPL)
Lynn Frazier (R-NPL)	72nd (1931–1933)	Gerald Nye (R-NPL)
Lynn Frazier (R-NPL)	73rd (1933–1935)	Gerald Nye (R-NPL)
Lynn Frazier (R-NPL)	74th (1935–1937)	Gerald Nye (R-NPL)
Lynn Frazier (R-NPL)	75th (1937–1939)	Gerald Nye (R-NPL)
Lynn Frazier (R-NPL)	76th (1939–1941)	Gerald Nye (R-NPL)
William Langer (R-NPL)	77th (1941–1943)	Gerald Nye (R-NPL)
William Langer (R-NPL)	78th (1943–1945)	Gerald Nye (R-NPL)
William Langer (R-NPL)	79th (1945–1947)	John Moses (D)
William Langer (R-NPL)	79th (1945–1947)	Milton Young (R)
William Langer (R-NPL)	80th (1947–1949)	Milton Young (R)
William Langer (R-NPL)	81st (1949–1951)	Milton Young (R)
William Langer (R-NPL)	82nd (1951–1953)	Milton Young (R)
William Langer (R-NPL)	83rd (1953–1955)	Milton Young (R)
William Langer (R-NPL)	84th (1955–1957)	Milton Young (R)
William Langer (R-NPL)	85th (1957–1959)	Milton Young (R)
William Langer (R-NPL)	86th (1959–1961)	Milton Young (R)
Norman Brunsdale (R)	86th (1959–1961)	Milton Young (R)
Quentin Burdick (D-NPL)	86th (1959–1961)	Milton Young (R)
Quentin Burdick (D-NPL)	87th (1961–1963)	Milton Young (R)
Quentin Burdick (D-NPL)	88th (1963–1965)	Milton Young (R)
Quentin Burdick (D-NPL)	89th (1965–1967)	Milton Young (R)
Quentin Burdick (D-NPL)	90th (1967–1969)	Milton Young (R)
Quentin Burdick (D-NPL)	91st (1969–1971)	Milton Young (R)
Quentin Burdick (D-NPL)	92nd (1971–1973)	Milton Young (R)
Quentin Burdick (D-NPL)	93rd (1973–1975)	Milton Young (R)
Quentin Burdick (D-NPL)	94th (1975–1977)	Milton Young (R)
Quentin Burdick (D-NPL)	95th (1977–1979)	Milton Young (R)
Quentin Burdick (D-NPL)	96th (1979–1981)	Milton Young (R)
Quentin Burdick (D-NPL)	97th (1981–1983)	Mark Andrews (R)
Quentin Burdick (D-NPL)	98th (1983–1985)	Mark Andrews (R)
Quentin Burdick (D-NPL)	99th (1985–1987)	Mark Andrews (R)
Quentin Burdick (D-NPL)	100th (1987–1989)	Kent Conrad (D-NPL)
Quentin Burdick (D-NPL)	101st (1989–1991)	Kent Conrad (D-NPL)
Quentin Burdick (D-NPL)	102nd (1991–1993)	Kent Conrad (D-NPL)
Jocelyn Burdick (D-NPL)	102nd (1991–1993)	Kent Conrad (D-NPL)
Kent Conrad (D-NPL)	102nd (1991–1993)	Byron Dorgan (D-NPL)
Kent Conrad (D-NPL)	103rd (1993–1995)	Byron Dorgan (D-NPL)
Kent Conrad (D-NPL)	104th (1995–1997)	Byron Dorgan (D-NPL)
Kent Conrad (D-NPL)	105th (1997–1999)	Byron Dorgan (D-NPL)
Kent Conrad (D-NPL)	106th (1999–2001)	Byron Dorgan (D-NPL)
Kent Conrad (D-NPL)	107th (2001–2003)	Byron Dorgan (D-NPL)
Kent Conrad (D-NPL)	108th (2003–2005)	Byron Dorgan (D-NPL)
Kent Conrad (D-NPL)	109th (2005–2007)	Byron Dorgan (D-NPL)
Kent Conrad (D-NPL)	110th (2007–2009)	Byron Dorgan (D-NPL)
Kent Conrad (D-NPL)	111th (2009–2011)	Byron Dorgan (D-NPL)
Kent Conrad (D-NPL)	112th (2011–2013)	John Hoeven (R)
Heidi Heitkamp (D-NPL)	113th (2013–2015)	John Hoeven (R)
Heidi Heitkamp (D-NPL)	114th (2015–2017)	John Hoeven (R)
Heidi Heitkamp (D-NPL)	115th (2017–2019)	John Hoeven (R)
Kevin Cramer (R)	116th (2019–2021)	John Hoeven (R)
Kevin Cramer (R)	117th (2021–2023)	John Hoeven (R)
Kevin Cramer (R)	118th (2023–2025)	John Hoeven (R)
Kevin Cramer (R)	119th (2025–2027)	John Hoeven (R)
Kevin Cramer (R)	120th (2027–2029)	John Hoeven (R)

== United States House of Representatives ==
Current U.S. representatives from North Dakota
District	Member (Residence)	Party	Incumbent since	CPVI (2025)	District map
At-large	Julie Fedorchak (Mandan)	Republican	January 3, 2025	R+18	

Congress	1st at-large seat	2nd at-large seat	
51st (1889–1891)	Henry C. Hansbrough (R)	2nd at-large seat	
52nd (1891–1893)	Martin N. Johnson (R)	2nd at-large seat	
53rd (1893–1895)	Martin N. Johnson (R)	2nd at-large seat	
54th (1895–1897)	Martin N. Johnson (R)	2nd at-large seat	
55th (1897–1899)	Martin N. Johnson (R)	2nd at-large seat	
56th (1899–1901)	Burleigh F. Spalding (R)	2nd at-large seat	
57th (1901–1903)	Thomas F. Marshall (R)	2nd at-large seat	
58th (1903–1905)	Thomas F. Marshall (R)	Burleigh F. Spalding (R)	
59th (1905–1907)	Thomas F. Marshall (R)	Asle Gronna (R)	
60th (1907–1909)	Thomas F. Marshall (R)	Asle Gronna (R)	
61st (1909–1911)	L. B. Hanna (R)	Asle Gronna (R)	
62nd (1911–1913)	L. B. Hanna (R)	Henry T. Helgesen (R)	
Congress	1st district	2nd district	3rd district
63rd (1913–1915)	Henry T. Helgesen (R)	George M. Young (R)	Patrick Norton (R)
64th (1915–1917)	Henry T. Helgesen (R)	George M. Young (R)	Patrick Norton (R)
65th (1917–1919)	Henry T. Helgesen (R)	George M. Young (R)	Patrick Norton (R)
65th (1917–1919)	John M. Baer (R-NPL)	George M. Young (R)	Patrick Norton (R)
66th (1919–1921)	John M. Baer (R-NPL)	George M. Young (R)	James H. Sinclair (R)
67th (1921–1923)	Olger B. Burtness (R)	George M. Young (R)	James H. Sinclair (R)
68th (1923–1925)	Olger B. Burtness (R)	George M. Young (R)	James H. Sinclair (R)
68th (1923–1925)	Olger B. Burtness (R)	Thomas Hall (R)	James H. Sinclair (R)
69th (1925–1927)	Olger B. Burtness (R)	Thomas Hall (R)	James H. Sinclair (R)
70th (1927–1929)	Olger B. Burtness (R)	Thomas Hall (R)	James H. Sinclair (R)
71st (1929–1931)	Olger B. Burtness (R)	Thomas Hall (R)	James H. Sinclair (R)
72nd (1931–1933)	Olger B. Burtness (R)	Thomas Hall (R)	James H. Sinclair (R)
Congress	1st at-large seat	2nd at-large seat	
73rd (1933–1935)	James H. Sinclair (R)	William Lemke (R-NPL)	
74th (1935–1937)	Usher L. Burdick (R-NPL)	William Lemke (R-NPL)	
75th (1937–1939)	Usher L. Burdick (R-NPL)	William Lemke (R-NPL)	
76th (1939–1941)	Usher L. Burdick (R-NPL)	William Lemke (R-NPL)	
77th (1941–1943)	Usher L. Burdick (R-NPL)	Charles R. Robertson (R)	
78th (1943–1945)	Usher L. Burdick (R-NPL)	William Lemke (R-NPL)	
79th (1945–1947)	Charles R. Robertson (R)	William Lemke (R-NPL)	
80th (1947–1949)	Charles R. Robertson (R)	William Lemke (R-NPL)	
81st (1949–1951)	Usher L. Burdick (R-NPL)	William Lemke (R-NPL)	
82nd (1951–1953)	Usher L. Burdick (R-NPL)	Fred G. Aandahl (R)	
83rd (1953–1955)	Usher L. Burdick (R-NPL)	Otto Krueger (R)	
84th (1955–1957)	Usher L. Burdick (R-NPL)	Otto Krueger (R)	
85th (1957–1959)	Usher L. Burdick (R-NPL)	Otto Krueger (R)	
86th (1959–1961)	Quentin Burdick (D-NPL)	Don L. Short (R)	
87th (1961–1963)	Hjalmar Nygaard (R)	Don L. Short (R)	
Congress	1st district	2nd district	
88th (1963–1965)	Hjalmar Nygaard (R)	Don L. Short (R)	
88th (1963–1965)	Mark Andrews (R)	Don L. Short (R)	
89th (1965–1967)	Mark Andrews (R)	Rolland W. Redlin (D-NPL)	
90th (1967–1969)	Mark Andrews (R)	Thomas S. Kleppe (R)	
91st (1969–1971)	Mark Andrews (R)	Thomas S. Kleppe (R)	
92nd (1971–1973)	Mark Andrews (R)	Arthur A. Link (D-NPL)	
Congress	At-large seat		
93rd (1973–1975)	Mark Andrews (R)		
94th (1975–1977)	Mark Andrews (R)		
95th (1977–1979)	Mark Andrews (R)		
96th (1979–1981)	Mark Andrews (R)		
97th (1981–1983)	Byron Dorgan (D-NPL)		
98th (1983–1985)	Byron Dorgan (D-NPL)		
99th (1985–1987)	Byron Dorgan (D-NPL)		
100th (1987–1989)	Byron Dorgan (D-NPL)		
101st (1989–1991)	Byron Dorgan (D-NPL)		
102nd (1991–1993)	Byron Dorgan (D-NPL)		
103rd (1993–1995)	Earl Pomeroy (D-NPL)		
104th (1995–1997)	Earl Pomeroy (D-NPL)		
105th (1997–1999)	Earl Pomeroy (D-NPL)		
106th (1999–2001)	Earl Pomeroy (D-NPL)		
107th (2001–2003)	Earl Pomeroy (D-NPL)		
108th (2003–2005)	Earl Pomeroy (D-NPL)		
109th (2005–2007)	Earl Pomeroy (D-NPL)		
110th (2007–2009)	Earl Pomeroy (D-NPL)		
111th (2009–2011)	Earl Pomeroy (D-NPL)		
112th (2011–2013)	Rick Berg (R)		
113th (2013–2015)	Kevin Cramer (R)		
114th (2015–2017)	Kevin Cramer (R)		
115th (2017–2019)	Kevin Cramer (R)		
116th (2019–2021)	Kelly Armstrong (R)		
117th (2021–2023)	Kelly Armstrong (R)		
118th (2023–2025)	Kelly Armstrong (R)		
119th (2025–2027)	Julie Fedorchak (R)		
120th (2027–2029)	Julie Fedorchak (R)		
Congress	At-large seat		

== Key ==
Democratic (D)
Democratic–NPL (D–NPL)
Nonpartisan League (NPL)
Republican (R)

== See also ==
- List of United States congressional districts
- North Dakota's congressional districts
- Political party strength in North Dakota
