= Economic Programs (United States) =

Economic Programs in the United States are created for the purpose of helping the economy.

== Acts ==
- Emergency Banking Act
- Economy Act
- Agriculture Adjustment Act (AAA)
- National Industrial Recovery Act (NIRA)
- Banking Act of 1933
- Frazier-Lemke Farm Bankruptcy Act
- Federal Securities Act
- Glass–Steagall Act
- National Housing Act
- Securities and Exchange Act (SEC)
- Indian Reorganization Act

== Alphabet agencies ==
- Civilian Conservation Corps (CCC)
- Tennessee Valley Authority (TVA)
- Public Works Administration (PWA)
- Federal Emergency Relief Administration (FERA)
- Federal Housing Administration (FHA)
- Civil Works Administration (CWA)
- Federal Deposit Insurance Corporation (FDIC)
- Home Owners' Loan Corporation (HOLC)
- Works Progress Administration (WPA)
- National Youth Administration (NYA)
