= 1936 United States presidential election in Alabama =

- November 3, 1936

Nominee	Franklin D. Roosevelt	Alf Landon
Party	Democratic	Republican
Home state	New York	Kansas
Running mate	John Nance Garner	Frank Knox
Electoral vote	11	0
Popular vote	238,196	35,358
Percentage	86.38%	12.82%
County results
Roosevelt
50–60%
60–70%
70–80%
80–90%
90–100%
Landon
50–60%

The 1936 United States presidential election in Alabama took place on November 3, 1936, as part of the nationwide presidential election. Voters chose eleven representatives, or electors to the Electoral College, who voted for president and vice president. In Alabama, voters voted for electors individually instead of as a slate, as in the other states.

Since the 1890s, Alabama had been effectively a one-party state ruled by the Democratic Party. Disenfranchisement of almost all African-Americans and a large proportion of poor whites via poll taxes, literacy tests and informal harassment had essentially eliminated opposition parties outside of Unionist Winston County and a few nearby northern hill counties that had been Populist strongholds. The only competitive statewide elections became Democratic Party primaries that were limited by law to white voters. Unlike most other Confederate states, however, soon after black disenfranchisement Alabama's remaining white Republicans made rapid efforts to expel blacks from the state Republican Party. Indeed, under Oscar D. Street, who ironically was appointed state party boss as part of the pro-Taft “black and tan” faction in 1912, the state GOP would permanently turn “lily-white”, with the last black delegates from the state at any Republican National Convention serving in 1920.

The 1920 election, aided by isolationism in Appalachia and the whitening of the state GOP, saw the Republicans gain their best presidential vote share in Alabama since 1884, while the GOP even exceed forty percent in the House of Representatives races for the 4th, 7th and 10th congressional districts. However, funding issues meant the Republicans would not emulate their efforts in the rest of the decade. Nevertheless, a bitter “civil war” over how best to maintain white supremacy after the Democrats nominated urban, anti-Prohibition Catholic Al Smith saw so many Democrats defect to dry, Protestant Republican Herbert Hoover that he came within seven thousand votes of winning the state.

However, the economic catastrophe of the Great Depression meant that this trend towards the GOP would be short-lived. The Depression had extremely severe effects in the South, which had the highest unemployment rate in the nation, and many Southerners blamed this on the North and on Wall Street. Consequently, the South gave Democratic nominee Franklin D. Roosevelt extremely heavy support in 1932 — he became the only presidential candidate to sweep all of Alabama's counties.

For 1936, Roosevelt's campaigning substantially moved away from the South — where almost none of the lower classes could vote — to focus on the working classes of the North and West. However, this was clearly not going to affect his majority amongst an electorate who generally associated the Republican Party — even a lily-white Republican Party — with Reconstruction and black rule. A poll in late September showed Roosevelt leading Republican nominee and Kansas Governor Alf Landon by four-to-one despite Landon leading the nation as a whole. Another poll two weeks later saw the President's lead falling slightly, but this lead would be maintained in the last poll near the end of October. As it turned out – like all the Literary Digest polls — Roosevelt's strength was severely underestimated, for he actually won 86.38 percent of Alabama's vote to Landon's 12.82 percent, this being the best performance by a presidential candidate in Alabama since the largely uncontested elections of 1832.

== Results ==
General election results
Party	Pledged to	Elector	Votes
Democratic Party	Franklin D. Roosevelt	W. E. James	238,196
Democratic Party	Franklin D. Roosevelt	Ralph H. Parker	238,195
Democratic Party	Franklin D. Roosevelt	Ben Bloodworth	238,194
Democratic Party	Franklin D. Roosevelt	Charles W. Edwards	238,192
Democratic Party	Franklin D. Roosevelt	R. E. Jones	238,191
Democratic Party	Franklin D. Roosevelt	Francisc J.Ingre	238,186
Democratic Party	Franklin D. Roosevelt	B. J. Cowart	238,185
Democratic Party	Franklin D. Roosevelt	N. Frank Pridgen	238,185
Democratic Party	Franklin D. Roosevelt	Reese T. Amis	238,131
Democratic Party	Franklin D. Roosevelt	Howards H. Sullinger	238,090
Democratic Party	Franklin D. Roosevelt	Tom B. Ware	238,075
Republican Party	Alf Landon	S. B. Adams	35,358
Republican Party	Alf Landon	J. F. Brawner	35,340
Republican Party	Alf Landon	L. A. Carroll	35,334
Republican Party	Alf Landon	Frank Barchard Sr.	35,330
Republican Party	Alf Landon	N. C. Fuller	35,328
Republican Party	Alf Landon	J. D. Bush	35,320
Republican Party	Alf Landon	A. L. Isbell	35,320
Republican Party	Alf Landon	J. M. Pennington	35,304
Republican Party	Alf Landon	A. P. Longshore Jr.	35,303
Republican Party	Alf Landon	H. W. Pond	35,297
Republican Party	Alf Landon	S. E. Wright	35,288
Prohibition Party	D. Leigh Colvin	Frank Barnard	719
Communist Party USA	Earl Browder	A. M. Forman	678
Communist Party USA	Earl Browder	Hugh C. Taylor	647
Communist Party USA	Earl Browder	Harry Gideon	646
Communist Party USA	Earl Browder	D. J. Williams	645
Communist Party USA	Earl Browder	Kery A. McCloud	644
Communist Party USA	Earl Browder	John Smith	644
Communist Party USA	Earl Browder	Charles Otto	642
Communist Party USA	Earl Browder	Jesse G. Owen	642
Communist Party USA	Earl Browder	R. I. Smith	642
Prohibition Party	D. Leigh Colvin	Joseph Suggs	617
Prohibition Party	D. Leigh Colvin	R. M. Hunter	613
Prohibition Party	D. Leigh Colvin	W. T. Ellisor	610
Prohibition Party	D. Leigh Colvin	John C. Orr	610
Prohibition Party	D. Leigh Colvin	J. W. Frankling	609
Prohibition Party	D. Leigh Colvin	W. C. McMahan	608
Union Party	William Lemke	W. O. Broyles	551
Union Party	William Lemke	R. E. Hill	550
Union Party	William Lemke	W. O. Bonham	549
Union Party	William Lemke	L. D. Holstun	549
Union Party	William Lemke	A. W. Holstun	549
Union Party	William Lemke	Rudolph Kern	549
Union Party	William Lemke	C. C. Rolfe	549
Union Party	William Lemke	A. B. Fewell	548
Union Party	William Lemke	Arthur S. Gray	548
Union Party	William Lemke	George Jodan	548
Union Party	William Lemke	J. Jordan	548
Socialist Party of America	Norman Thomas	Arlie Barber	242
Socialist Party of America	Norman Thomas	Jane Wheeler	242
Socialist Party of America	Norman Thomas	George W. Wilson	241
Socialist Party of America	Norman Thomas	W. H. Chichester	240
Socialist Party of America	Norman Thomas	Mary Denman	240
Socialist Party of America	Norman Thomas	Emma Connally	239
Socialist Party of America	Norman Thomas	C. G. Hutchisson	239
Socialist Party of America	Norman Thomas	W. F. Spencer	239
Socialist Party of America	Norman Thomas	W. M. Vaughan	239
Socialist Party of America	Norman Thomas	Hugh Barber	238
Socialist Party of America	Norman Thomas	O. H. Brittain	238
Total votes			275,744

=== Results by county ===
County	Franklin D. Roosevelt Democratic		Alf Landon Republican		Various candidates Other parties		Margin		Total votes cast
County	#	%	#	%	#	%	#	%	Total votes cast
Autauga	1,525	94.37%	84	5.20%	7	0.43%	1,441	89.17%	1,616
Baldwin	2,337	78.79%	433	14.60%	196	6.61%	1,904	64.19%	2,966
Barbour	2,386	97.51%	50	2.04%	11	0.45%	2,336	95.46%	2,447
Bibb	1,868	90.42%	190	9.20%	8	0.39%	1,678	81.22%	2,066
Blount	2,788	78.23%	744	20.88%	32	0.90%	2,044	57.35%	3,564
Bullock	1,188	99.50%	5	0.42%	1	0.08%	1,183	99.08%	1,194
Butler	2,358	96.32%	83	3.39%	7	0.29%	2,275	92.93%	2,448
Calhoun	4,322	87.12%	581	11.71%	58	1.17%	3,741	75.41%	4,961
Chambers	3,626	96.90%	112	2.99%	4	0.11%	3,514	93.91%	3,742
Cherokee	2,113	84.28%	375	14.96%	19	0.76%	1,738	69.33%	2,507
Chilton	2,565	63.26%	1,469	36.23%	21	0.52%	1,096	27.03%	4,055
Choctaw	1,507	95.32%	74	4.68%	0	0.00%	1,433	90.64%	1,581
Clarke	2,673	97.73%	60	2.19%	2	0.07%	2,613	95.54%	2,735
Clay	2,138	71.84%	699	23.49%	139	4.67%	1,439	48.35%	2,976
Cleburne	1,212	68.63%	543	30.75%	11	0.62%	669	37.88%	1,766
Coffee	3,178	96.16%	110	3.33%	17	0.51%	3,068	92.83%	3,305
Colbert	3,365	92.75%	251	6.92%	12	0.33%	3,114	85.83%	3,628
Conecuh	2,195	95.60%	89	3.88%	12	0.52%	2,106	91.72%	2,296
Coosa	1,346	83.24%	239	14.78%	32	1.98%	1,107	68.46%	1,617
Covington	4,265	95.93%	167	3.76%	14	0.31%	4,098	92.17%	4,446
Crenshaw	2,371	95.95%	96	3.89%	4	0.16%	2,275	92.07%	2,471
Cullman	3,779	68.75%	1,703	30.98%	15	0.27%	2,076	37.77%	5,497
Dale	2,404	92.50%	193	7.43%	2	0.08%	2,211	85.07%	2,599
Dallas	3,205	98.37%	49	1.50%	4	0.12%	3,156	96.87%	3,258
DeKalb	6,122	56.89%	4,617	42.90%	23	0.21%	1,505	13.98%	10,762
Elmore	3,967	92.47%	175	4.08%	148	3.45%	3,792	88.39%	4,290
Escambia	2,585	92.72%	193	6.92%	10	0.36%	2,392	85.80%	2,788
Etowah	5,739	82.24%	1,207	17.30%	32	0.46%	4,532	64.95%	6,978
Fayette	2,244	74.82%	732	24.41%	23	0.77%	1,512	50.42%	2,999
Franklin	3,059	61.62%	1,875	37.77%	30	0.60%	1,184	23.85%	4,964
Geneva	2,652	89.93%	295	10.00%	2	0.07%	2,357	79.93%	2,949
Greene	861	97.40%	20	2.26%	3	0.34%	841	95.14%	884
Hale	1,626	98.31%	20	1.21%	8	0.48%	1,606	97.10%	1,654
Henry	1,925	98.06%	35	1.78%	3	0.15%	1,890	96.28%	1,963
Houston	3,538	93.52%	230	6.08%	15	0.40%	3,308	87.44%	3,783
Jackson	3,450	78.71%	926	21.13%	7	0.16%	2,524	57.59%	4,383
Jefferson	35,980	89.52%	3,810	9.48%	404	1.01%	32,170	80.04%	40,194
Lamar	2,393	92.25%	195	7.52%	6	0.23%	2,198	84.73%	2,594
Lauderdale	4,685	91.97%	389	7.64%	20	0.39%	4,296	84.33%	5,094
Lawrence	2,213	83.10%	444	16.67%	6	0.23%	1,769	66.43%	2,663
Lee	2,182	95.62%	93	4.08%	7	0.31%	2,089	91.54%	2,282
Limestone	2,861	95.69%	108	3.61%	21	0.70%	2,753	92.07%	2,990
Lowndes	1,204	99.01%	10	0.82%	2	0.16%	1,194	98.19%	1,216
Macon	1,146	96.71%	39	3.29%	0	0.00%	1,107	93.42%	1,185
Madison	5,662	91.03%	513	8.25%	45	0.72%	5,149	82.78%	6,220
Marengo	2,287	98.54%	33	1.42%	1	0.04%	2,254	97.11%	2,321
Marion	2,655	73.96%	892	24.85%	43	1.20%	1,763	49.11%	3,590
Marshall	4,208	81.68%	925	17.95%	19	0.37%	3,283	63.72%	5,152
Mobile	11,165	90.78%	1,072	8.72%	62	0.50%	10,093	82.06%	12,299
Monroe	2,558	98.54%	29	1.12%	9	0.35%	2,529	97.42%	2,596
Montgomery	12,061	97.80%	223	1.81%	48	0.39%	11,838	95.99%	12,332
Morgan	5,597	92.39%	432	7.13%	29	0.48%	5,165	85.26%	6,058
Perry	1,527	98.45%	24	1.55%	0	0.00%	1,503	96.91%	1,551
Pickens	1,665	93.59%	107	6.01%	7	0.39%	1,558	87.58%	1,779
Pike	3,100	98.19%	55	1.74%	2	0.06%	3,045	96.45%	3,157
Randolph	2,766	77.39%	793	22.19%	15	0.42%	1,973	55.20%	3,574
Russell	2,181	96.68%	66	2.93%	9	0.40%	2,115	93.75%	2,256
Shelby	2,371	74.54%	777	24.43%	33	1.04%	1,594	50.11%	3,181
St. Clair	2,399	61.83%	1,465	37.76%	16	0.41%	934	24.07%	3,880
Sumter	1,369	98.28%	24	1.72%	0	0.00%	1,345	96.55%	1,393
Talladega	3,751	85.42%	489	11.14%	151	3.44%	3,262	74.29%	4,391
Tallapoosa	3,625	96.10%	141	3.74%	6	0.16%	3,484	92.36%	3,772
Tuscaloosa	6,029	94.31%	332	5.19%	32	0.50%	5,697	89.11%	6,393
Walker	5,697	76.12%	1,699	22.70%	88	1.18%	3,998	53.42%	7,484
Washington	1,736	95.28%	72	3.95%	14	0.77%	1,664	91.33%	1,822
Wilcox	1,365	99.13%	11	0.80%	1	0.07%	1,354	98.33%	1,377
Winston	1,270	46.98%	1,425	52.72%	8	0.30%	−155	−5.73%	2,703
Totals	238,196	86.38%	35,358	12.82%	2,190	0.79%	202,838	73.56%	275,744

==== Counties that flipped Democratic to Republican ====
- Winston

== See also ==
- United States presidential elections in Alabama
