= 1970 United States Senate election in North Dakota =

- November 3, 1970
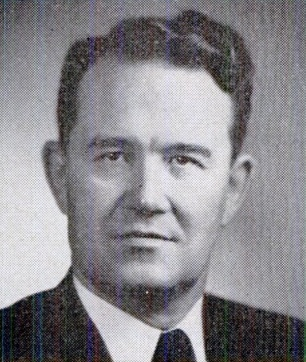

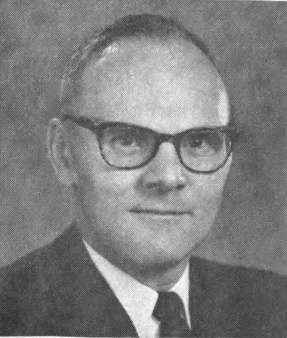
Nominee	Quentin Burdick	Thomas Kleppe
Party	Democratic–NPL	Republican
Popular vote	134,519	82,996
Percentage	61.27%	37.80%
- County results Burdick: 50–60% 60–70% 70–80% Kleppe: 50–60% 60–70%
U.S. senator before election
Quentin Burdick
Democratic
Elected U.S. Senator
Quentin Burdick
Democratic

The 1970 United States Senate election in North Dakota was held November 3, 1970. The incumbent, North Dakota Democratic NPL Party Senator Quentin Burdick, was re-elected to his third term, defeating Republican candidate Thomas S. Kleppe, who later became the United States Secretary of the Interior.

Only Burdick filed as a Dem-NPLer, and the endorsed Republican candidate was Thomas S. Kleppe, who was finishing his second and final term as a representative for North Dakota's second congressional district. Burdick and Kleppe won the primary elections for their respective parties. This race was a rematch of the Senate race between the two that took place in 1964.

One independent candidate, Russell Kleppe, also filed before the deadline.

== Election results ==
1970 United States Senate election in North Dakota
Party	Candidate	Votes	%
Democratic–NPL	Quentin Burdick (incumbent)	134,519	61.27
Republican	Thomas S. Kleppe	82,996	37.80
Independent	Russell Kleppe	2,045	0.93
Majority		51,523	
Turnout		219,560	

== See also ==
- United States Senate elections, 1970
