= 1917 United States House of Representatives elections =

There were eight special elections to the United States House of Representatives in 1917, during the 64th United States Congress and 65th United States Congress.

== List of elections ==
District	Incumbent			This race	
District	Member	Party	First elected	Results	Candidates
Georgia 8th	Samuel J. Tribble	Democratic	1910	Incumbent died December 8, 1916, after re-election. New member elected January 11, 1917 to finish the current term. Democratic hold. Winner was not a candidate for the next term; see below.	▌ ✓ Tinsley W. Rucker Jr. (Democratic) 59.22%; ▌Q. L. Williford (Democratic) 40.78%
Georgia 8th	Samuel J. Tribble	Democratic	1910	Incumbent died December 8, 1916, after re-election. New member elected January 11, 1917 to begin the next term. Democratic hold. Winner was not a candidate to finish the previous term; see above.	▌ ✓ Charles H. Brand (Democratic); Unopposed
South Carolina 5th	David E. Finley	Democratic	1898	Incumbent died January 26, 1917, after re-election. New member elected February 21, 1917 to finish the current term. Democratic hold. Winner was not a candidate for the next term; see below.	▌ ✓ Paul G. McCorkle (Democratic); Unopposed
South Carolina 5th	David E. Finley	Democratic	1898	Incumbent died January 26, 1917, during previous congress after re-election. New member elected February 21, 1917 to begin the next term. Democratic hold. Winner was not a candidate to finish the previous term; see above.	▌ ✓ William F. Stevenson (Democratic); Unopposed
New York 15th	Michael F. Conry	Democratic	1908	Incumbent died March 2, 1917, during previous congress. New member elected April 12, 1917. Democratic gain.	▌ ✓ Thomas F. Smith (Democratic); ▌John N. Boyle (Republican) 20.34%; ▌Joseph D. Cannon (Socialist) 6.21%; ▌William Crosby (Prohibition) 0.04%
New Hampshire 1st	Cyrus A. Sulloway	Republican	1894	Incumbent died March 11, 1917. New member elected May 29, 1917. Republican hold.	▌ ✓ Sherman E. Burroughs (Republican) 51.67%; ▌Patrick H. Sullivan (Democratic) 47.97%; ▌Charles W. Greene (Socialist) 0.36%
Indiana 6th	Daniel W. Comstock	Republican	1916	Incumbent died May 19, 1917. New member was elected June 29, 1917. Republican hold.	▌ ✓ Richard N. Elliott (Republican) 54.34%; ▌Finly H. Gray (Democratic) 45.67%
North Dakota 1st	Henry T. Helgesen	Republican	1910	Incumbent died April 10, 1917. New member was elected July 20, 1917. Republican hold.	▌ ✓ John M. Baer (Republican-NPL); [data missing]
Pennsylvania 28th	Orrin D. Bleakley	Republican	1916	Incumbent resigned April 3, 1917, after being convicted and fined under the Federal Corrupt Practices Act. New member elected November 6, 1917. Democratic gain.	▌ ✓ Earl H. Beshlin (Democratic); [data missing]
Massachusetts 6th	Augustus P. Gardner	Republican	1902 (special)	Incumbent resigned May 15, 1917, to join the U.S. Army. New member elected November 6, 1917. Republican hold.	▌ ✓ Willfred W. Lufkin (Republican) 68.82%; ▌George A. Schofield (Democratic) 25.28%; ▌Chester W. Bixby (Socialist) 5.91%
Connecticut 4th	Ebenezer J. Hill	Republican	1894	Incumbent died September 27, 1917. New member was elected November 6, 1917. Republican hold.	▌ ✓ Schuyler Merritt (Republican) 55.03%; ▌Lynn W. Wilson (Democratic) 38.91%; ▌Charles E. Haines (Socialist) 5.00%; ▌Charles B. Allyn (Prohibition) 1.06%

== See also ==
- 1916 United States House of Representatives elections
