= George A. Bangs =

Attorney from North Dakota (1867–1955)

- Portrait of George A. Bangs, circa 1917
- Born: November 8, 1867; Le Sueur County, Minnesota
- Died: July 15, 1955 (aged 87); Indianapolis, Indiana
- Occupation: attorney

George Archer Bangs (November 8, 1867 – July 15, 1955) was an American lawyer and insurance executive. He was a prominent attorney in North Dakota from the early 1900s to the 1930s, with a law firm in Grand Forks. He later served as President of the United Mutual Life Insurance Company in Indianapolis, Indiana, from the early 1930s to 1947.

== Early life ==
Bangs was born in Le Sueur County, Minnesota, to Alfred W. Bangs and Sarah D. (Plowman) Bangs. He grew up and attended school in Le Sueur County and then worked at his father's law office.

== Career ==
In 1882 or 1883, Bangs moved to Grand Forks, Dakota Territory (North Dakota) and worked as a clerk in the land office for a few years. In 1892 or 1893, he joined the law office of his half-brother, Tracy R. Bangs, and Charles J. Fisk. Tracy Bangs left the firm in 1895. George Bangs and Fisk then ran the firm until Fisk was elected District Judge in 1897.

Bangs quickly became a prominent and respected lawyer in the state. He served as attorney for the city of Grand Forks and was elected State's Attorney of Grand Forks County, serving one term.

In 1911, Bangs served as one of the prosecuting attorneys during the impeachment trial of Judge John F. Cowan. The charges against Cowan included habitual drunkenness, frequenting establishments where intoxicating liquors were sold (North Dakota was a "dry state" at the time), engaging in disorderly and boisterous conduct, speaking lewd and obscene words, assaulting a woman by attempting to forcibly kiss her, dismissing or ignoring motions and cases, deceiving the auditor, influencing jurors, intimidating attorneys, and sleeping during trials. Lead counsel for the defense was Tracy Bangs, George's half-brother. Ultimately, Cowan was found not guilty.

In 1916, Bangs ran for U.S. Congress but was defeated by Henry T. Helgesen.

During World War I, but after the Armistice, Bangs was commissioned as a major in the Army and was assigned to the Office of Judge Advocate General (JAG). He was commissioned in March 1919 and was stationed in Washington, D.C. He was discharged a few months later in October 1919.

From about 1923 to 1924, Bangs assisted the North Dakota Attorney General's office with its cases against those connected to the Scandinavian American Bank of Fargo. These cases were heavily influenced by politics, which pitted the Independent Voters Association (IVA) against the Nonpartisan League (NPL).

Into the 1920s, Bangs continued to assist North Dakota state government in various ways. He served as counsel for the State Banking Department and the Guaranty Fund Commission, and he was also a member of the State Fair Association.

Bangs practiced law in Grand Forks until the early 1930s.

== Later years ==
In the fall of 1932, Bangs moved to Indianapolis, Indiana, and served as President of the United Mutual Life Insurance Company. He led the company until 1947, when he retired. Previously, Bangs had been involved with insurance law and cases, and he assisted the Knights of Pythias with adjusting their insurance rates in the early 1900s.

Bangs died in Indianapolis in 1955.

== Personal life ==
In 1889, Bangs married Maria A. Griggs. In March 1891, Maria Bangs traveled to the Northwestern Hospital in Minneapolis for treatment for consumption (tuberculosis). She died a week later at the age of 20.

In 1895, Bangs married Zenia A. Gilbreath (sometimes spelled "Xenia"), who was a stenographer at the Bangs & Fisk law firm. Around 1911, Zenia Bangs fell ill, and she eventually went to Wisconsin for treatment. She died in September 1912.

In 1922, Bangs married Cyrilla A. Behme.

== See also ==
- 1916 United States House of Representatives elections
- North Dakota's 1st congressional district
