= 1964 United States Senate election in North Dakota =

- November 3, 1964
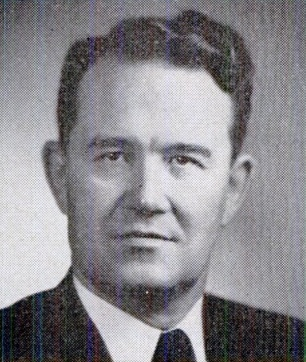

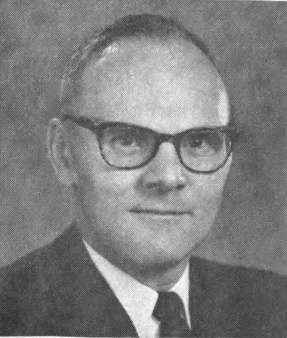
Nominee	Quentin Burdick	Thomas Kleppe
Party	Democratic–NPL	Republican
Popular vote	149,264	109,681
Percentage	57.64%	42.36%
- County results Burdick: 50–60% 60–70% 70–80% Kleppe: 50–60% 60–70%
U.S. senator before election
Quentin Burdick
Democratic–NPL
Elected U.S. senator
Quentin Burdick
Democratic–NPL

The 1964 U.S. Senate election for the state of North Dakota was held November 3, 1964. The incumbent, Dem-NPL Senator Quentin Burdick, sought and received re-election to his second term, defeating Republican candidate Thomas S. Kleppe, who later became the United States Secretary of the Interior.

Only Burdick filed as a Dem-NPLer, and the endorsed Republican candidate was Thomas S. Kleppe, who served two terms as a representative for North Dakota's second congressional district from 1967 to 1971. Burdick and Kleppe won the primary elections for their respective parties.

Burdick and Kleppe would face off against each other again in 1970.

== Election results ==
1964 United States Senate election in North Dakota
Party	Candidate	Votes	%	±%
Democratic–NPL	Quentin Burdick (incumbent)	149,264	57.64	
Republican	Thomas S. Kleppe	109,681	42.36	
Majority		39,583		
Turnout		219,560		
