= ND-1 =

ND-1 may refer to:

- North Dakota's 1st congressional district
- Namco ND-1 ARCADE GAME PCB
