= John M. Baer =

American politician (1886–1970)

John Miller Baer
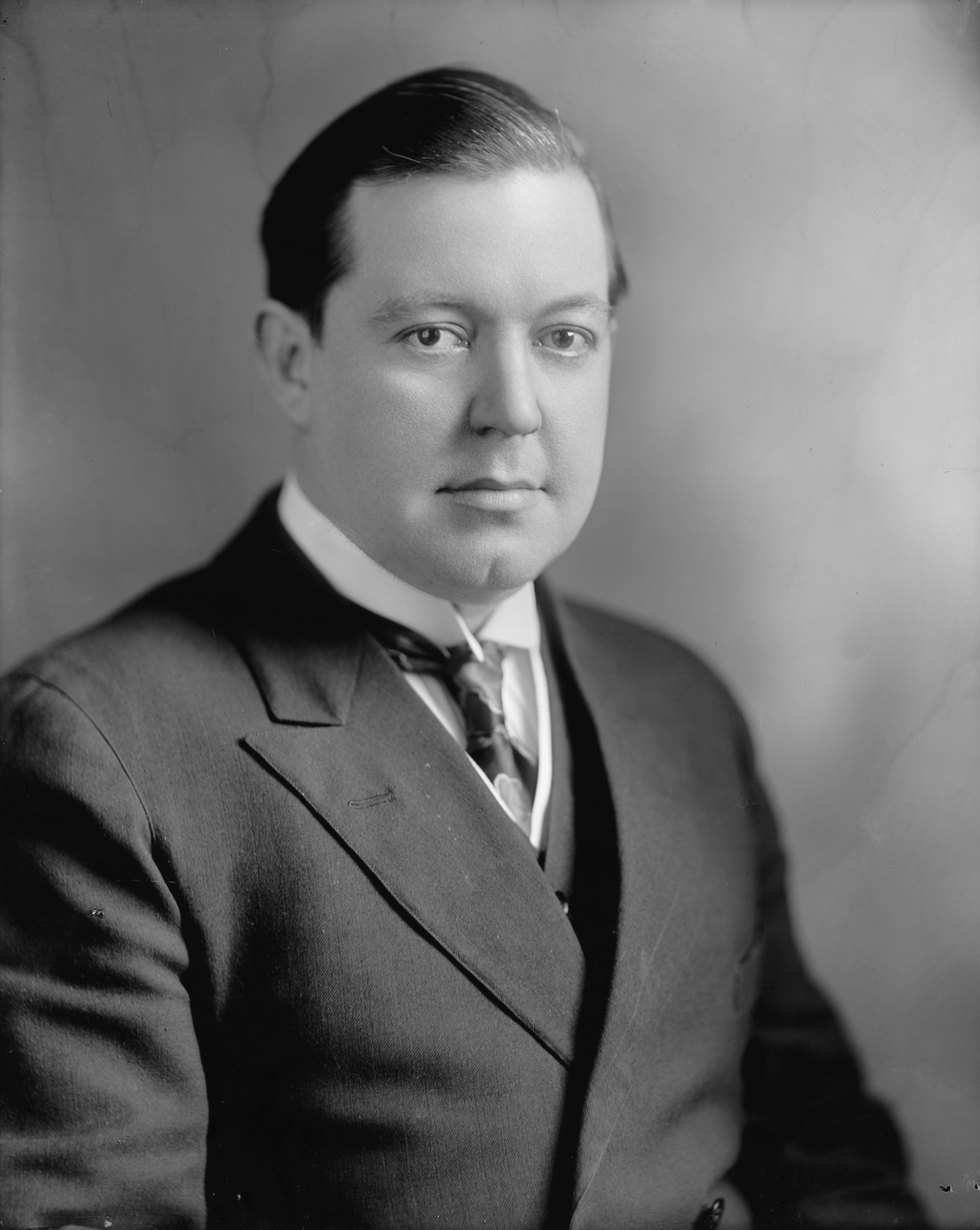
- Portrait by Harris & Ewing c. 1917–1921

Member of the U.S. House of Representatives from North Dakota's 1st district
- In office August 10, 1917 – March 3, 1921
- Preceded by: Henry Thomas Helgesen
- Succeeded by: Olger B. Burtness

Personal details
- Born: March 29, 1886 Black Creek, Wisconsin U.S.
- Died: February 18, 1970 (aged 83) Washington, D.C., U.S.
- Party: Republican Party (NPL faction)
- Education: Lawrence University
- Profession: Engineer, cartoonist, postmaster

John Miller Baer (March 29, 1886 – February 18, 1970) was a U.S. representative from North Dakota.

== Early years and education ==
Born at Black Creek, Wisconsin, Baer was the son of Capt. John M. Baer and Libbie Riley Baer. His ancestors on the maternal side were the two families Riley and Swing. From the original family of the former descended the poet and humorist, James Whitcomb Riley, and from the latter, the philosopher and preacher. Prof. David Swing, of Chicago. Baer was also a descendant of the Blairs, an old and favorably known family of Southern Ohio.

Baer attended the public schools of his town. He was graduated from Lawrence University, Appleton, Wisconsin, in 1909.

== Career ==
He moved to Golden Valley County, North Dakota, in 1909 and engaged as a civil engineer and in agricultural pursuits from 1909 to 1915 and served as Postmaster of Beach, North Dakota.

Baer also worked as a cartoonist and furnished cartoons and articles to newspapers. Baer worked for the Non-Partisan Leader from 1909 to 1917. After resigning as postmaster, Baer relocated to Fargo and cartooned for the Fargo Courier-News.

Baer was elected as a member of the Nonpartisan League to the Sixty-fifth Congress by special election, to fill the vacancy caused by the death of United States Representative Henry T. Helgesen, and reelected to the succeeding Congress (August 10, 1917 – March 3, 1921). He served as chairman of the Committee on Expenditures in the Department of Agriculture (Sixty-sixth Congress). He was an unsuccessful candidate for reelection to the Sixty-seventh Congress in 1920. He resumed activities as a cartoonist and journalist for Labor, the newspaper of the National Railroad Union.

He died in Washington, D.C., on February 18, 1970. He was interred in Gate of Heaven Cemetery, Silver Spring, Maryland.

== Sources ==
- United States Congress. "John M. Baer (id: B000027)". Biographical Directory of the United States Congress.

U.S. House of Representatives
Preceded by Henry T. Helgesen	Member of the U.S. House of Representatives from North Dakota's 1st congressional district 1917–1921	Succeeded by Olger B. Burtness
