= Hilary J. Sandoval Jr. =

American businessman (1930–1973)

9th Administrator of the Small Business Administration
- In office March 5, 1969 – January 1, 1971
- President: Richard Nixon
- Preceded by: Howard J. Samuels
- Succeeded by: Thomas S. Kleppe

Personal details
- Born: January 29, 1930 El Paso, Texas, U.S.
- Died: June 11, 1973 (aged 43) El Paso, Texas, U.S.
- Party: Republican

Hilary J. Sandoval Jr. (January 29, 1930 – June 11, 1973) was an American businessman who served as Administrator of the Small Business Administration from 1969 to 1971.

He died on June 11, 1973, in El Paso, Texas, from complications of brain surgeries at the age of 43.
