= Thomas S. Kleppe =

American politician (1919–2007)

Thomas Kleppe
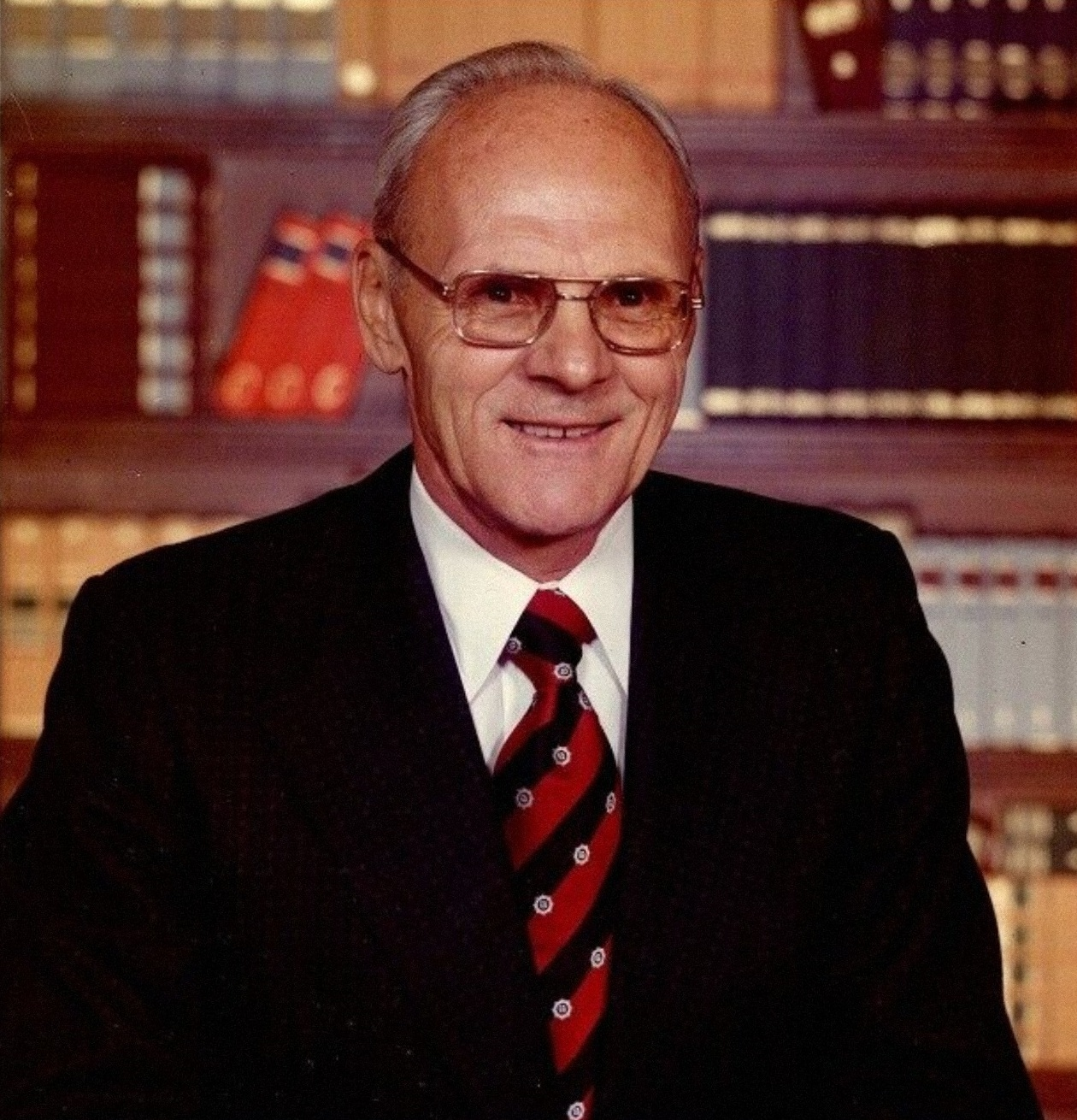
- Official portrait, 1975

41st United States Secretary of the Interior
- In office October 17, 1975 – January 20, 1977
- President: Gerald Ford
- Preceded by: Stanley K. Hathaway
- Succeeded by: Cecil Andrus

10th Administrator of the Small Business Administration
- In office January 18, 1971 – October 12, 1975
- President: Richard Nixon; Gerald Ford
- Preceded by: Hilary J. Sandoval Jr.
- Succeeded by: Mitchell P. Kobelinski

Member of the U.S. House of Representatives from North Dakota's 2nd district
- In office January 3, 1967 – January 3, 1971
- Preceded by: Rolland W. Redlin
- Succeeded by: Art Link

Mayor of Bismarck
- In office April 1950 – April 1954
- Preceded by: Amil Lenhart
- Succeeded by: Evan Lips

Personal details
- Born: July 1, 1919 Kintyre, North Dakota, U.S.
- Died: March 2, 2007 (aged 87) Bethesda, Maryland, U.S.
- Resting place: Arlington National Cemetery
- Party: Republican
- Spouse: Glen Loew Gompf
- Children: 4
- Education: Valley City State University (BA)

Military service
- Allegiance: United States
- Branch/service: {United States Army
- Years of service: 1942–1946
- Battles/wars: World War II

Thomas Savig Kleppe (July 1, 1919 – March 2, 2007) was an American politician who served as the representative from North Dakota. He was also the administrator of the Small Business Administration and the U.S. secretary of the interior.

== Early life and military service ==
Kleppe was born on July 1, 1919, in Kintyre, North Dakota, the son of Lars O. Kleppe and his wife Hannah Savig Kleppe. He graduated from Valley City High School in Valley City, North Dakota, in 1936. Kleppe graduated from Valley City State University, (then Valley City Teachers College). During World War II, Kleppe served from 1942 to 1946 as a Warrant Officer.

== Career ==
From 1950 to 1954, Kleppe was the mayor of Bismarck, North Dakota. From 1946 to 1964, he was the president and treasurer of the Gold Seal Company. In 1964, Kleppe was the Republican nominee for United States Senate but lost to the popular incumbent Democrat Quentin N. Burdick. In 1966 he was elected to the 90th United States Congress, and he was reelected in 1968 to the 91st United States Congress (January 3, 1967 – January 3, 1971). Kleppe voted in favor of the Civil Rights Act of 1968.

With the state's second congressional district by then all but certain to be abolished following the 1970 census, Kleppe opted to seek a rematch against Burdick in 1970. He was once again unsuccessful, losing by a wide margin.

He served as the administrator of the Small Business Administration, and later served as the secretary of the interior for President Gerald Ford. In his capacity as the Secretary of the Interior, Kleppe was the appellant in Kleppe v. New Mexico (1976), when the Supreme Court ruled that Congress has the "power to protect wildlife on the public lands, state law notwithstanding."

== Personal life ==
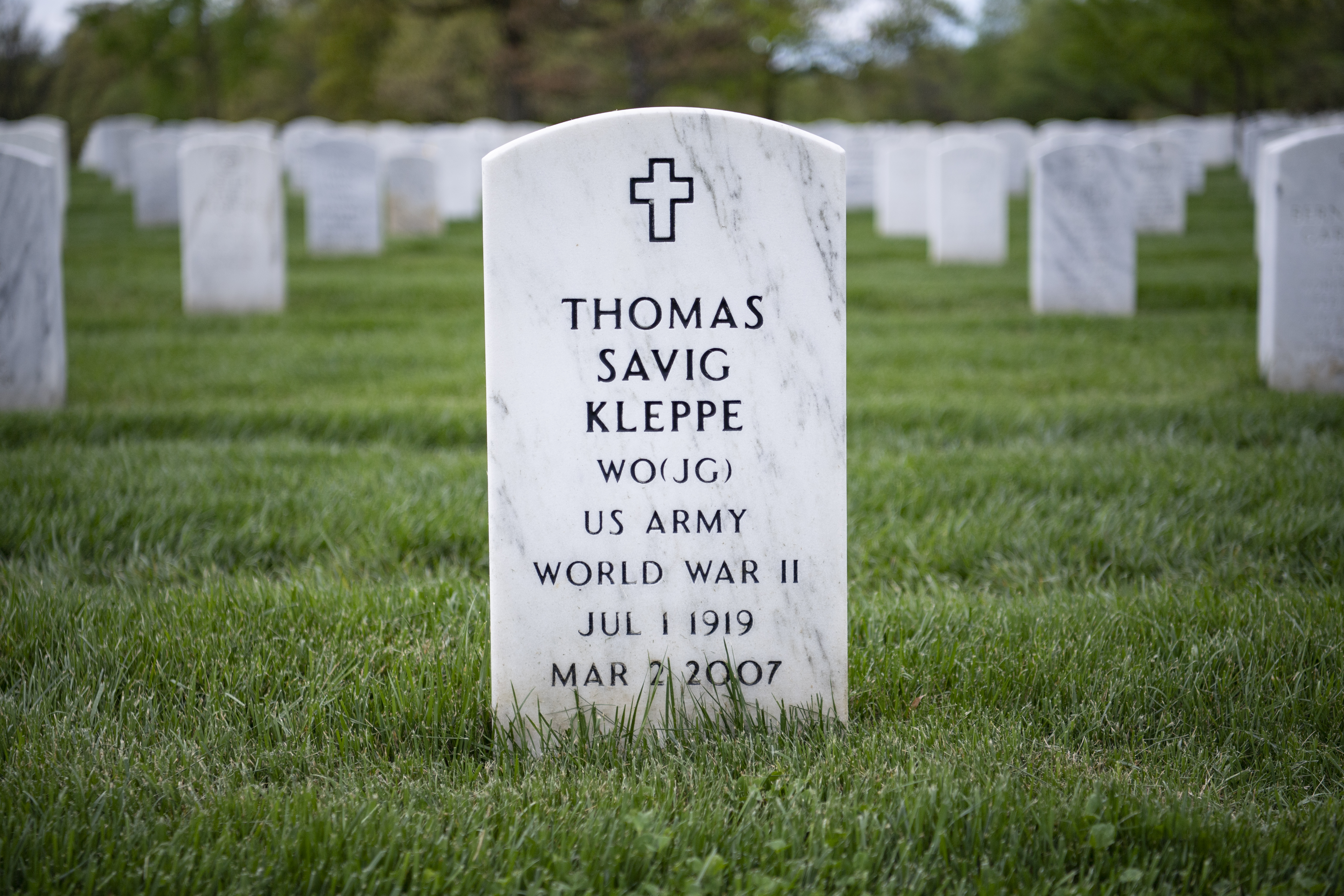
Grave at Arlington National Cemetery

His first wife, Frieda K. Kleppe, died in 1957. Kleppe married his second wife, Glendora Loew Gompf, on December 18, 1958. He had two children from his first marriage and two daughters from his second marriage. He resided in Bismarck, North Dakota. Kleppe died of Alzheimer's disease, in Bethesda, Maryland, on March 2, 2007. He was buried in Arlington National Cemetery in Arlington, Virginia.

== See also ==
- North Dakota United States Senate election, 1970
- North Dakota United States Senate election, 1964
- Sagebrush Rebellion
- Kleppe v. New Mexico

Party political offices
Preceded by John E. Davis	Republican nominee for U.S. Senator from North Dakota (Class 1); 1964, 1970	Succeeded by Robert Stroup
U.S. House of Representatives
Preceded by Rolland W. Redlin	Member of the U.S. House of Representatives from North Dakota's 2nd congressional district 1967–1971	Succeeded by Arthur A. Link
Political offices
Preceded by Hilary J. Sandoval Jr.	Administrator of the Small Business Administration; 1971–1975	Succeeded by Mitchell P. Kobelinski
Preceded by Stanley K. Hathaway	United States Secretary of the Interior; 1975–1977	Succeeded by Cecil D. Andrus
