= Kintyre, North Dakota =

- Unincorporated community
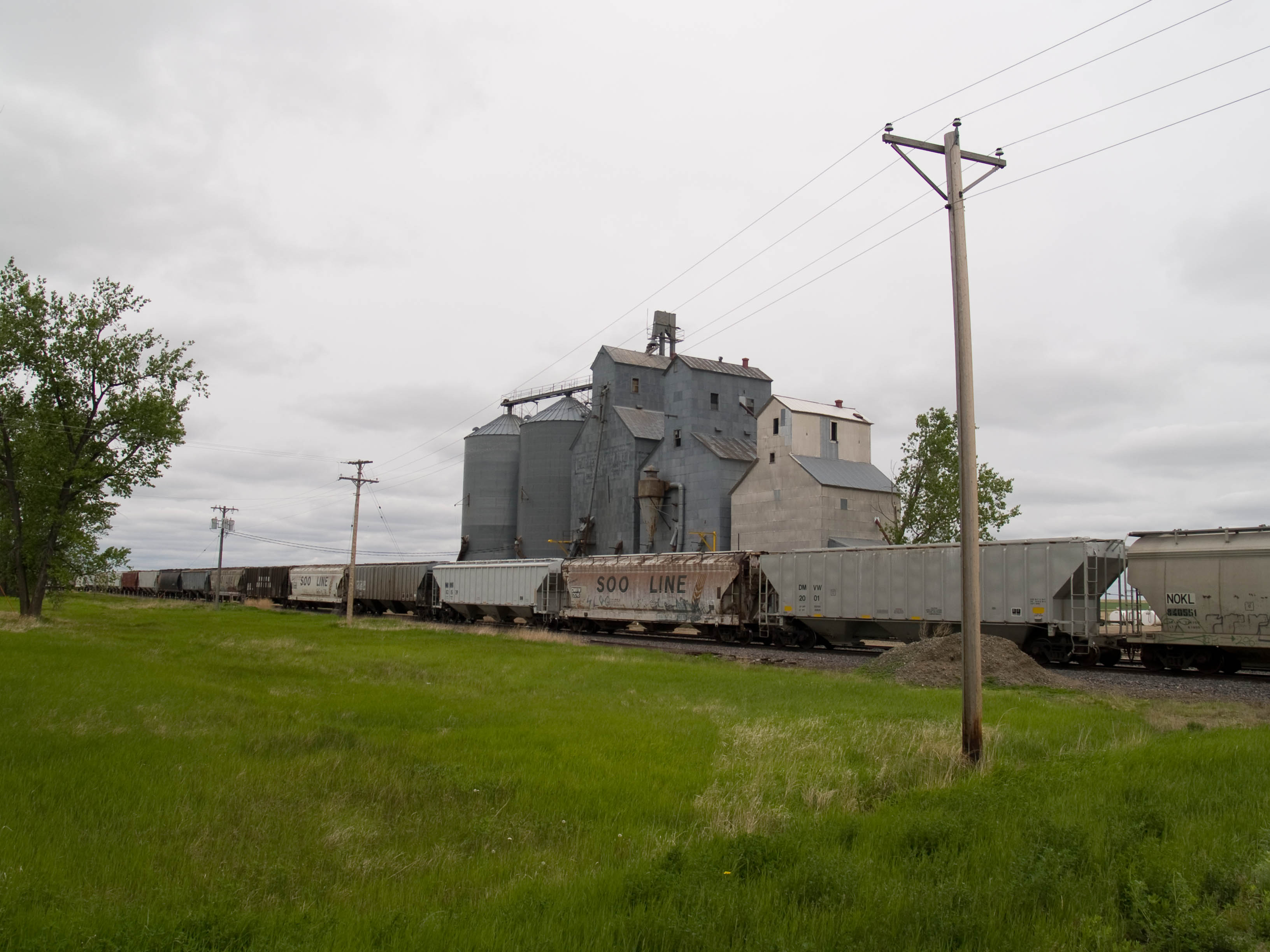
- The town's grain elevator, with a DMVW train parked at the terminal in the foreground

- Location within the state of North Dakota Kintyre (the United States)
- Coordinates: 46°32′59″N 99°56′58″W
- Country: United States
- State: North Dakota
- County: Emmons
- Elevation: 1,903 ft (580 m)
- Time zone: UTC-6 (Central (CST))
  - Summer (DST): UTC-5 (CDT)
- ZIP codes: 58549
- Area code: 701
- GNIS feature ID: 1029746

Kintyre (also Campbell) is an unincorporated community in northeastern Emmons County, North Dakota, United States. It lies northeast of the city of Linton, the county seat of Emmons County. The community was originally named Campbell for Dugald and Hugh Campbell, brothers who ranched there; it is now named Kintyre for the Kintyre Peninsula in Argyll, Scotland. It has a post office with the ZIP code 58549.

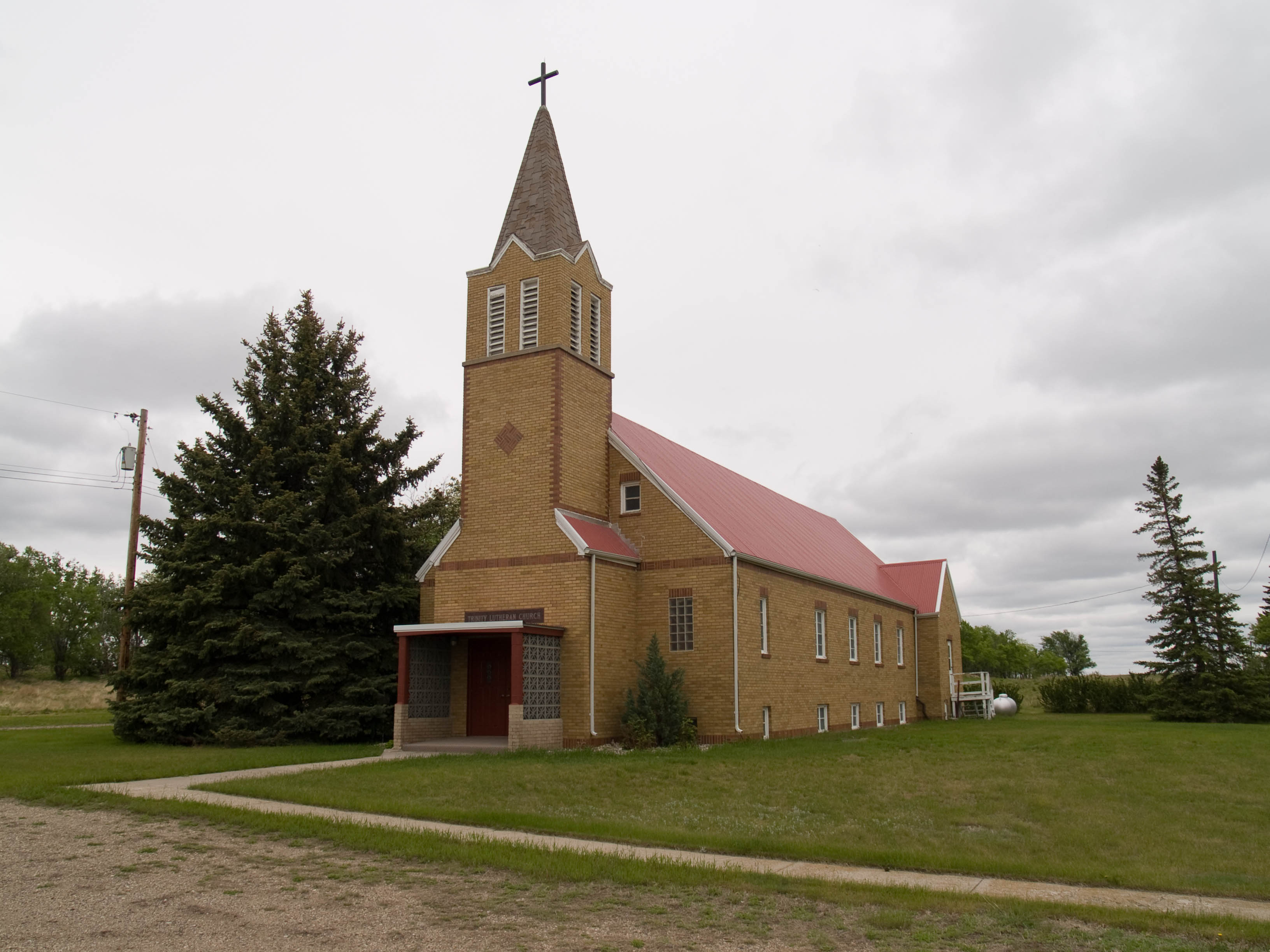
Trinity Lutheran Church

== Notable people ==
- Thomas S. Kleppe, mayor and U.S Secretary of the Interior
