= Libbie Riley Baer =

American poet (1849–1929)

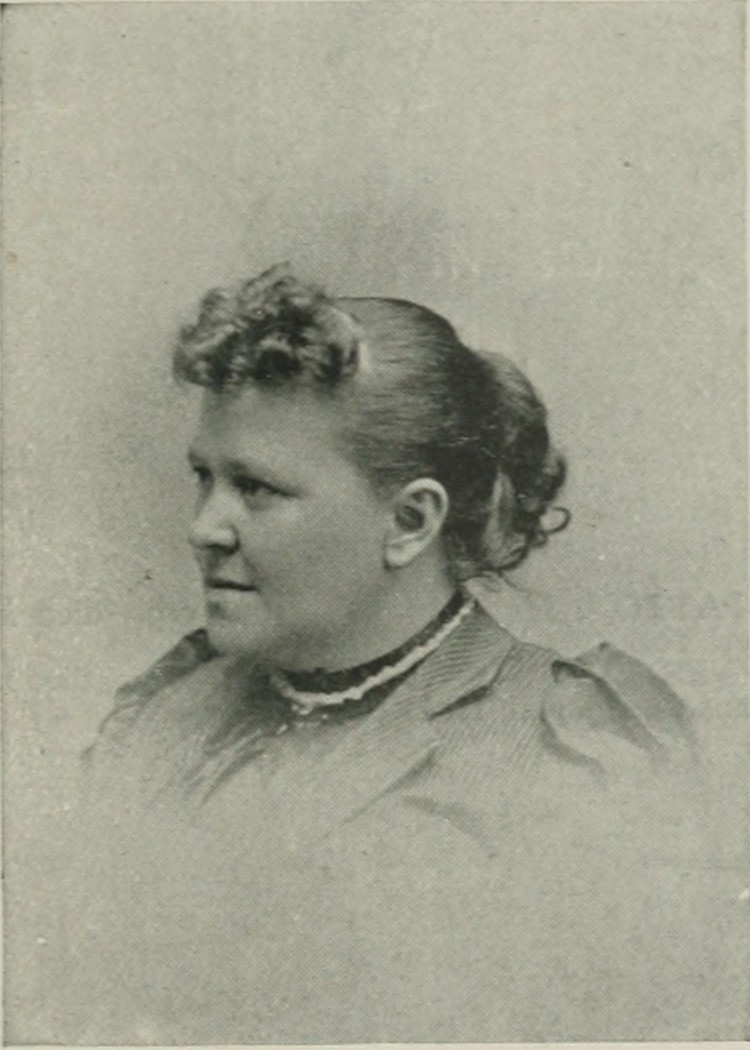
- Photo in A Woman of the Century
- Born: Elizabeth Caroline Riley; November 18, 1849; Bethel, Ohio, U.S.
- Died: February 27, 1929 (aged 79)
- Resting place: Riverside Cemetery, Appleton, Wisconsin, U.S.
- Other name: "Libbie"
- Occupation: Poet
- Spouse: John Mason Baer (m. 1867)
- Children: John Miller Baer
- Writing career
- Language: English
- Notable work: In the Land of Fancy

Signature
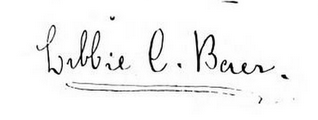

Libbie Riley Baer (née Riley; November 18, 1849 – February 27, 1929) was an American poet from Ohio. A relative of James Whitcomb Riley, she began writing poetry at the age of ten and later contributed works to various journals. Her poetry often reflected themes of patriotism and humanitarianism. She was the author of In the Land of Fancy. In addition to her writing, Baer was an active member of the Woman's Relief Corps (WRC) and held several leadership positions within the organization. Her son, John Miller Baer, served as a U.S. representative.

== Early life ==
Elizabeth (nickname, "Libbie") Caroline Riley was born near Bethel, Ohio, November 18, 1849. Her ancestors on the paternal side were the two families Riley and Swing. From the original family of the former descended the poet and humorist, James Whitcomb Riley, and from the latter, the philosopher and preacher, Prof. David Swing, of Chicago. On the maternal side, Baer was a descendant of the Blairs, an old family of Southern Ohio.

She wrote her first poem when she was ten.

== Career ==
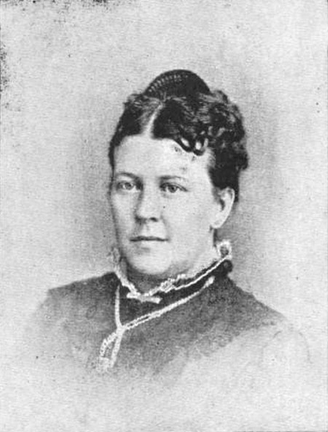
Libbie Baer

Upon the organization of the WRC, as allied with the Grand Army of the Republic, Baer took an important part in the benevolent work of that order, and held various responsible positions connected with it, devoting much time and energy to the cause. Though always proficient in poetical composition, she really began her literary career about 1883. Many of her poems published in various journals were inspired by the spirit of patriotism. Devotion to friends and to the cause of humanity, and warm sympathy for every deserving cause that needs assistance, were reflected in her poems. Her verse flowed smoothly, with an easy rhythm and unstudied grace, which seemed to indicate a spontaneous origin.

== Personal life ==
On November 14, 1867, she married Capt. John Mason Baer. She went with him to Appleton, Wisconsin. Their son, John Miller Baer, served as a U.S. Representative from North Dakota. She died February 27, 1929, and was buried at Riverside Cemetery, in Appleton.
