= Ralph Kilzer =

American politician

Member of the North Dakota Senate from the 47th district
- In office December 1, 1998 – December 1, 2018
- Preceded by: Evan Lips
- Succeeded by: Michael Dwyer

Member of the North Dakota House of Representatives
- In office 1996–1998

Personal details
- Born: March 30, 1935 (age 91)
- Party: Republican
- Education: Saint John's University (BS); Medical College of Wisconsin (MD, MPH)

Military service
- Branch/service: United States Army

Ralph L. Kilzer (born March 30, 1935) is an American politician and physician who served as a member of the North Dakota Senate for the 47th district from 1998 to 2018.

== Education ==
Kilzer earned a Bachelor of Science degree from Saint John's University, followed by a Doctor of Medicine and Master of Public Health from the Medical College of Wisconsin.

== Career ==
Kilzer served in the United States Army. He later worked as an orthopedic surgeon and as a clinical professor of surgery at the University of North Dakota School of Medicine and Health Sciences. He was also a medical consultant for the North Dakota Workers Compensation Bureau. From 1996 to 1998, he was a member of the North Dakota House of Representatives. Kilzer was elected to the North Dakota Senate in November 1998 and assumed office on December 1, 1998.
