= Olger B. Burtness =

American politician and judge

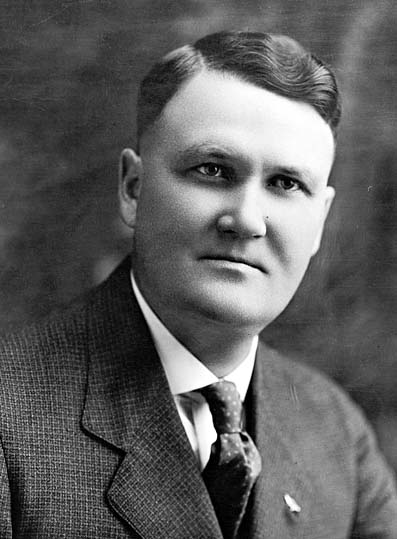
- Burtness in 1923

Member of the U.S. House of Representatives from North Dakota's 1st district
- In office March 4, 1921 – March 3, 1933
- Preceded by: John Miller Baer
- Succeeded by: William Lemke

Member of the North Dakota House of Representatives
- In office 1919–1920

Personal details
- Born: March 14, 1884 near Mekinock, Dakota Territory (now North Dakota)
- Died: January 20, 1960 (aged 75) Grand Forks, North Dakota
- Party: Republican
- Profession: Lawyer

Olger Burton Burtness (March 14, 1884 – January 20, 1960) was a U.S. representative from North Dakota and a North Dakota district court judge.

== Background ==
Olger Burton Burtness was born on a farm near Mekinock in the Dakota Territory. He was the son of Ole O. and Mary (Anderson) Burtness, both immigrants from Norway. Burtness graduated from the academic department of the University of North Dakota at Grand Forks in 1906 and from its law department in 1907. He represented the university in several intercollegiate debates and was also active in The Mimer Society, a Scandinavian literary society. He was also a member of the university football team and was editor in chief of the Dacotah annual. Burtness was one of the founders of the UND Alumni Association, and helped organize the UND Development Fund.

== Career ==
He was admitted to the bar the same year and commenced practice in Grand Forks. He served as prosecuting attorney of Grand Forks County 1911–1916. He served as delegate to the Republican National Conventions in 1916, 1936, and 1948.

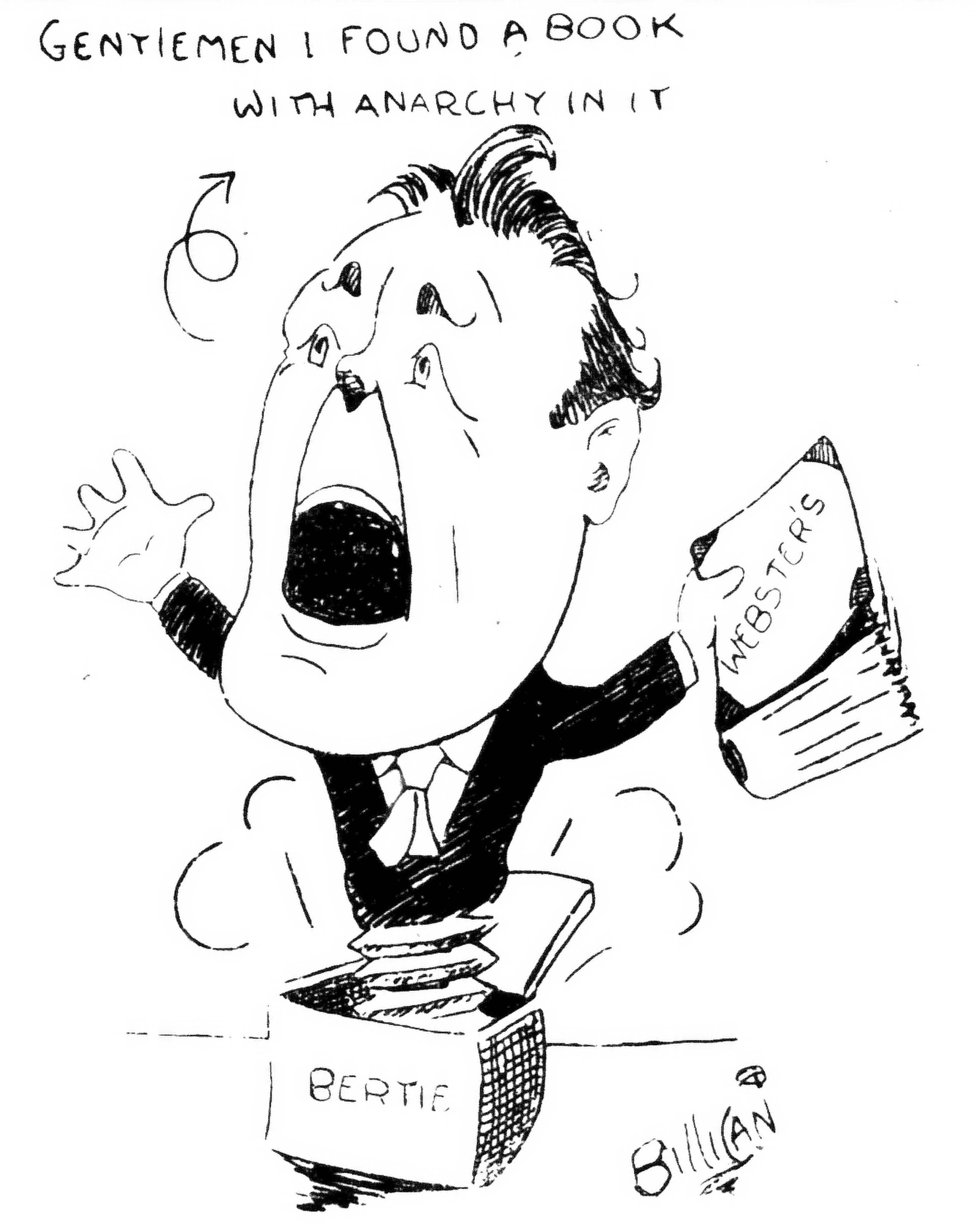
A 1919 pro-NPL cartoon from Billican (Wilfred Canan) depicting Rep. Burtness as a jack-in-the-box proclaiming he found a book with anarchy in it (a dictionary). The cartoon was published in the "Burleigh County Farmers Press" after Burtness had instigated a book scandal for the Board of Administration and NPL.

He served as member of the North Dakota State House of Representatives in 1919 and 1920. During this time, he was an opponent of the Nonpartisan League and was associated with the Independent Voters Association.

Burtness was elected as a Republican to the Sixty-seventh United States Congress and to the five succeeding Congresses (March 4, 1921 – March 3, 1933). He was an unsuccessful candidate for renomination in 1932.

In 1930 he was honored by the King of Denmark with an Order of the Falcon with a star. He also represented the President of the United States at the 100th anniversary of the Icelandic Parliament.

== Later years ==
He resumed the practice of law and served as City attorney of Grand Forks, in 1936 and 1937. He was appointed judge of the First Judicial District, North Dakota District Court, by Governor Fred G. Aandahl in 1950 and served from November 1950 until his death. He died in Grand Forks on January 20, 1960. He was interred in Memorial Park Cemetery.

== Personal life ==
He married Zoe Ensign on September 8, 1909, in Detroit Lakes, Minnesota. Following his death, Zoe Burtness donated funds to the University of North Dakota to construct an assembly hall for plays, lectures, and concerts, in honor of her husband. The Burtness Theater was dedicated on April 28, 1963.

== Olger B. Burtness Papers ==
The Olger B. Burtness Papers consist primarily of personal diaries for 1921 and 1927, as well as personal financial records. Correspondence and material concerning the Dakota Playmakers, and the Sock and Buskin Society at the University of North Dakota.

U.S. House of Representatives
Preceded by John Miller Baer	Member of the U.S. House of Representatives from North Dakota's 1st congressional district 1921–1933	Succeeded by William Lemke
