= Louisville Joint Stock Land Bank v. Radford =

- Supreme Court of the United States

Argued April 1–2, 1935 Decided May 27, 1935
- Full case name: Louisville Joint Stock Land Bank v. Radford
- Citations: 295 U.S. 555 (more) 55 S. Ct. 854; 79 L. Ed. 1593; 1935 U.S. LEXIS 1127

Case history
- Prior: Defendants convicted; Section 75 of the Bankruptcy Act [295 U.S. 555, 573] by the Frazier–Lemke Act, June 28, 1934, c. 869, 48 Stat. 1289, 11 U.S.C. § 203(s) upheld 8 F.Supp. 489 (United States District Court for Western Kentucky 1934); affirmed in 74 F.2d 576 (6th Cir. 1935); cert. granted, 294 U.S. 702 (1935)

Holding
- The Frazier–Lemke Act was unconstitutional because it took private property without a just compensation.

Court membership
- Chief Justice Charles E. Hughes Associate Justices Willis Van Devanter · James C. McReynolds; Louis Brandeis · George Sutherland; Pierce Butler · Harlan F. Stone; Owen Roberts · Benjamin N. Cardozo

Case opinion
- Majority: Brandeis, joined by unanimous

Laws applied
- U.S. Const. art. I; U.S. Const. amend. V; Frazier–Lemke Act, June 28, 1934, c. 869, 48 Stat. 1289, 11 U.S.C. § 203(s)

Louisville Joint Stock Land Bank v. Radford, 295 U.S. 555 (1935), was a decision by the Supreme Court of the United States that held that the Frazier–Lemke Farm Bankruptcy Act was an unconstitutional violation of the Fifth Amendment Takings Clause because it interfered with farmers' property rights in contracts they made with the United States. This unanimous decision was one of the Court's many rulings that overturned President Roosevelt's New Deal.

== Facts ==
In 1922 and 1924, Radford and his wife mortgaged a farm to the Louisville Joint Stock Land Bank in Christian County, Kentucky, comprising 170 acres (0.69 km^{2}), with an appraised value of at least $18,000 at that time (approximately $340,000 in 2025 dollars). Mortgages were given to secure loans totaling $9,000, to be repaid in installments over 34 years with interest at the rate of 6 per cent. In 1931 and subsequent years, the Radfords defaulted in payment of taxes. In 1932 and 1933, they defaulted in their promise to pay the installments of interest and principal. In 1933, they also defaulted in their covenant to keep the buildings insured. The Bank urged the Radfords to refinance the debt under the provisions of the Emergency Farm Mortgage Act, which they declined to do so. The Bank then declared the entire indebtedness immediately payable, and filed a suit in the circuit court for Christian county in June 1933, against the Radfords and their tenant to foreclose the mortgages. In addition, invoking a covenant in the mortgage expressly providing therefore, the bank sought to appoint a receiver to take possession and control of the premises and to collect the rents and profits.

The application for the appointment of a receiver was denied and all proceedings in the suit were suspended, upon request of the Conciliation Commissioner for Christian County appointed under section 75 of the Bankruptcy Act, stating that Radford desired to avail himself of the provisions of that section. Radford filed a petition asking for an opportunity to submit a composition of his debts, in the federal court for Western Kentucky. The petition was promptly approved and a meeting of the creditors was held, but Radford failed to obtain the acceptance of the requisite majority in number and amount to the composition proposed. Then, the Bank offered to accept a deed of the mortgaged property in full satisfaction of the indebtedness to it and to assume the unpaid taxes. Radford refused to execute the deed; on June 30, 1934, the state court ordered a foreclosure sale.

The Frazier–Lemke Emergency Farm Mortgage Act was passed on June 28, 1934. The act was designed to give aid to debt-ridden farmers, allowing them to reacquire farms they had lost from foreclosure, or to petition the Bankruptcy Court within their district to suspend foreclosure proceedings. The legislation's ultimate goal was to help those farmers scale down their mortgages. On August 6, 1934, and again on November 10, 1934, Radford filed amended petitions for relief thereunder. The second amended petition prayed that Radford be deemed bankrupt; that his property be appraised; and that he have the relief provided for in paragraphs 3 and 7 of subsection(s) of the Frazier–Lemke Amendment. That act provides, among other things, that a farmer who has failed to obtain the consents requisite to a composition under section 75 of the Bankruptcy Act, may, upon being adjudged a bankrupt, acquire alternative options in respect to mortgaged property:

1. By paragraph 3, the bankrupt may, if the mortgagee assents, purchase the property at its then appraised value, acquiring title as well as immediate possession, by agreeing to make deferred payments as follows: 2½ per cent. within two years; 2½ per cent. within three years; 5 per cent. within four years; 5 per cent. within five years; the balance within six years. All deferred payments to bear interest at the rate of 1 per cent. per annum.
2. By paragraph 7, the bankrupt may, if the mortgagee refuses the immediate purchase on the above basis, require the bankruptcy court to 'stay all proceedings for a period of five years, during which five years the debtor shall retain possession of all or any part of his property, under the control of the court, provided he pays a reasonable rental annually for that part of the property of which he retains possession; the first payment of such rental to be made within six months of the date of the order staying proceedings, such rental to be distributed among the secured and unsecured creditors, as their interests may appear, under the provisions of this Act (title). At the end of five years, or prior thereto, the debtor may pay into court the appraised price of the property of which he retains possession: Provided, That upon request of any lien holder on real estate the court shall cause a reappraisal of such real estate and the debtor may then pay the reappraised price, if acceptable to the lien holder, into the court, otherwise the original appraisal price shall be paid into court, and thereupon the court shall, by an order, turn over full possession and title of said property to the debtor and he may apply for his discharge as provided for by this Act (title): Provided, however, That the provisions of this Act (subsection) shall apply only to debts existing at the time this Act becomes effective (on June 28, 1934).

Answering the amended petition, the Bank claimed that the Frazier–Lemke Act was unconstitutional, and requested that Radford's amended petition be dismissed and that it be allowed to proceed with the foreclosure sale. It rejected the composition and extension proposal offered by Radford, and declined to consent to the proposed sale of that property to Radford at the appraised value or any value on the terms set forth in paragraph 3, and objected to his retaining possession thereof with the privilege of purchasing the same provided by paragraph 7. The federal court overruled the Bank's objections, adjudged Radford a bankrupt within the meaning of the Frazier–Lemke Act, and appointed a referee to take proceedings thereunder.

The referee ordered an appraisal of all of Radford's property, which found that 'the fair and reasonable value of the property of the debtor on which Louisville Joint Stock Bank has a mortgage' and also the 'market value of said land' was then $4,445. The referee approved the appraisal, although the Bank offered in open court to pay $9,205.09 in cash for the mortgaged property. Counsel for the bankrupt admitted that since the Bank had a valid lien upon it for the amount offered to be paid, if the Bank's offer to purchase the property were accepted, all the money paid in cash would be immediately returned to it in satisfaction of the mortgage indebtedness.

The Bank refused to sell the mortgaged property to Radford at the appraised value as prescribed by paragraph 3 of subsection (s). Thereupon, the referee ordered the suspension of all proceedings for the enforcement of the mortgages for five years, and that the possession of the mortgaged property, subject to liens, remain in Radford, under the control of the court, as provided in paragraph 7 of subsection (s). The referee fixed the rental for the first year at $325, and ordered that for each subsequent year the rental be fixed by the court. All the orders of the referee were, upon a petition for a review, approved by the District Court; and its decree was affirmed by the Circuit Court of Appeals on February 11, 1935.

== Decision ==
Justice Brandeis wrote for a unanimous Court in invalidating the Frazier–Lemke Act, holding that this act unfairly deprived the bank of private property without just compensation, in violation of the Fifth Amendment.

The Court had upheld a similar law in Home Building & Loan Ass'n v. Blaisdell, but the Court distinguished that case because the owner of the government contract in Blaisdell was able to apply for repayment on the government's debt to them.

The Court cited W.B. Worthen Co. v. Kavanaugh (1935) where the Court had held unconstitutional provisions of state legislation similar to the Frazier–Lemke Act, stating in that case that turning a mortgage into an undesirable investment for the mortgagee is an act of oppression by the government. The Court reversed the Circuit Court's decision, ruling that the Frazier–Lemke Act was unconstitutional in violation of the Fifth Amendment. "The Fifth Amendment," Brandeis declared, "commands that however great the Nation's need, private property shall not be thus taken over without just compensation."

However, the Supreme Court would not entirely rule against the policies which had been enforced under the Frazier Lemke Farm Bankruptcy Act, and recommended that the law could be re-enacted if it were fixed in a way which respected creditor property rights.

== Reaction ==
Along with Humphrey's Executor v. United States and A.L.A. Schechter Poultry Corp. v. United States, both decided in 1935, this Court decision was a major setback for the Roosevelt administration's New Deal program. Roosevelt became distressed upon learning the unanimity of these three court decisions. However, this would also be one of the few occasions where the court's three liberal judges agreed to overrule some of the New Deal legislation. The worst of Roosevelt's problems from the Supreme Court came from other decisions where Justice Owen Roberts sided with the court's four conservative justices to override other New Deal legislation. Roosevelt's setbacks with the Supreme Court eventually led to his attempt to pack the court.

In response to the Radford ruling, Congress soon afterwards re-enacted a new version of the Frazier–Lemke Farm Bankruptcy Act. The revised law, dubbed the "Farm Mortgage Moratorium Act," lowered the moratorium requirement for delaying foreclosure of a bankrupt farmer's property to a three-year period, in contrast to the previous five-year period.

After the end of the Lochner era, the court upheld an updated version of the law that the court interpreted as less of an infringement of the creditors' rights in Wright v. Vinton Branch.

An attempt made by Frazier-Lemke Act co-sponsor William Lemke to re-pass the original Frazier-Lemke Farm Bankruptcy Act in Congress as the refashioned, and even more sweeping, Frazier-Lemke Farm Refinance Act would be thwarted by President Roosevelt, which triggered Lemke's decision to run against Roosevelt in the 1936 United States presidential election on the ticket of the Charles Coughlin-led Union Party.

== See also ==
- A.L.A. Schechter Poultry Corp. v. United States (1935)
- Humphrey's Executor v. United States (1935)
