= 1963 United States House of Representatives elections =

Six members of the United States House of Representatives were elected in special elections in 1963.

== List of elections ==
District	Incumbent			This race	
District	Member	Party	First elected	Results	Candidates
California 1	Clem Miller	Democratic	1958	Incumbent member-elect died October 7, 1962, but was posthumously re-elected. New member elected January 22, 1963. Republican gain.	▌ ✓ Donald H. Clausen (Republican) 54.20%; ▌William F. Grader (Democratic) 44.66%; ▌John C. Stuart (Democratic) 1.14%
California 23	Clyde Doyle	Democratic	1944; 1946 (lost); 1948	Incumbent died March 14, 1963. New member elected June 11, 1963. Republican gain.	▌ ✓ Del M. Clawson (Republican) 53.19%; ▌Carley V. Porter (Democratic) 35.37%; ▌Maurice H. Quigley (Democratic) 4.69%; ▌Armand R. Porter (Democratic) 2.67%; ▌James E. Christo (Democratic) 1.41%; ▌Lynn W. Johnston (Democratic) 1.41%
Pennsylvania 15	Francis E. Walter	Democratic	1932	Incumbent died May 31, 1963. New member elected July 30, 1963. Democratic hold.	▌ ✓ Fred B. Rooney (Democratic) 53.55%; ▌Robert Bartlett (Republican) 46.45%
North Dakota 1	Hjalmar Nygaard	Republican	1960	Incumbent died July 18, 1963. New member elected October 22, 1963. Republican hold.	▌ ✓ Mark Andrews (Republican) 49.09%; ▌John Hove (Democratic-NPL) 44.30%; ▌John W. Scott (Conservative Republican) 6.25%
Pennsylvania 23	Leon H. Gavin	Republican	1942	Incumbent died September 15, 1963. New member elected November 5, 1963. Republican hold.	▌ ✓ Albert W. Johnson (Republican) 58.41%; ▌William T. Hagerty (Democratic) 41.60%
Texas 10	Homer Thornberry	Democratic	1948	Incumbent resigned December 20, 1963, to become a U.S. District Court judge. New member elected December 21, 1963. Democratic hold.	▌ ✓ J. J. Pickle (Democratic) 62.91%; ▌Jim Dobbs (Republican) 37.09

== See also ==
- List of special elections to the United States House of Representatives
