= Evan Lips =

American politician

Member of the North Dakota Senate from the 47th district
- In office December 1, 1960 – December 1, 1998
- Succeeded by: Ralph Kilzer

Personal details
- Born: October 17, 1918 Bismarck, North Dakota
- Died: January 9, 2005 (aged 86) Bismarck, North Dakota
- Party: Republican

Evan Lips (October 17, 1918 – January 9, 2005) was an American politician who served in the North Dakota Senate from the 47th district from 1960 to 1998.

He died on January 9, 2005, in Bismarck, North Dakota at age 86.
