= Charles R. Robertson =

American politician (1889–1951)

Charles Robertson

Member of the U.S. House of Representatives from North Dakota's at-large district
- In office January 3, 1945 – January 3, 1949 Serving with William Lemke
- Preceded by: Usher L. Burdick
- Succeeded by: Usher L. Burdick
- In office January 3, 1941 – January 3, 1943 Serving with Usher L. Burdick
- Preceded by: William Lemke
- Succeeded by: William Lemke

Personal details
- Born: September 5, 1889 Arlington, Wisconsin, U.S.
- Died: February 18, 1951 (aged 61) Bismarck, North Dakota, U.S
- Resting place: Lakewood Cemetery
- Party: Republican

Charles Raymond Robertson (September 5, 1889 – February 18, 1951) was a U.S. Republican politician.

Robertson was born to Scottish immigrants on a farm in Arlington, Wisconsin and attended Poynette High School. He attended Parker College in Winnebago, Minnesota, where he studied commerce, and he moved to Mandan, North Dakota in 1917. He was elected as a Republican to the United States House of Representatives from North Dakota and served from January 3, 1941, to January 3, 1943. He failed to be renominated to the House in 1942. He was elected to the House in 1944 and again in 1946 and served from January 3, 1945, to January 3, 1949. He died of a heart attack in Bismarck, North Dakota. He was buried in Lakewood Cemetery.

== Legacy ==
The Robertson Lignite Research Laboratory in Grand Forks, North Dakota was named after Robertson in 1951.

U.S. House of Representatives
Preceded by William Lemke	Member of the U.S. House of Representatives from North Dakota's at-large congressional district 1941–1943	Succeeded by William Lemke
Preceded by Usher L. Burdick	Member of the U.S. House of Representatives from North Dakota's at-large congressional district 1945–1949	Succeeded by Usher L. Burdick
