= Frazier–Lemke Farm Bankruptcy Act =

United States federal law

- Other short titles: Farm Mortgage Moratorium Act; Federal Farm Bankruptcy Act of 1934; Frazier-Lemke Act; Frazier-Lemke Farm-Mortgage Act
- Long title: An Act to amend an Act entitled "An Act to establish a uniform system of bankruptcy throughout the United States", approved 1 July 1898, and Acts amendatory thereof and supplementary thereto.
- Enacted by: the 73rd United States Congress
- Effective: 28 June 1934

Citations
- Public law: Pub. L. 73–486
- Statutes at Large: 48 Stat. 1289, Chapter 869

Legislative history
- Introduced in the House as S. 3580 on 1 June 1934; Passed the Senate on 13 June 1934 (passed); Passed the House on 15 June 1934 (passed, in lieu of H.R. 9865) with amendment; Reported by the joint conference committee on 16 June 1934; agreed to by the House on 18 June 1934 (agreed); Senate agreed to House amendment on 18 June 1934 (agreed); Signed into law by President Franklin D. Roosevelt on 28 June 1934

United States Supreme Court cases
- Louisville Joint Stock Land Bank v. Radford

The Frazier–Lemke Farm Bankruptcy Act was an Act of Congress passed in the United States in 1934 that restricted the ability of banks to repossess farms.

The U.S. 73rd Congressional Senate bill S. 3580 was signed into law by the 32nd President of the United States Franklin Roosevelt.

== Background ==
Between 1933 and 1936, the US Congress in conjunction with US President Franklin D. Roosevelt, passed several economic programs with the goals of giving work (relief) to the unemployed, reforming business and financial practices, and causing economic recovery during the Great Depression.

Roosevelt was interested in farm issues and believed that general prosperity would not return until farming was prosperous. Many different programs were directed at farmers. The first 100 days of his presidency produced a federal program to raise farm incomes by raising the prices farmers received, which was achieved by reducing total farm output. The Agricultural Adjustment Act created the Agricultural Adjustment Administration (AAA) in May 1933 and reflected the demands of leaders of major farm organizations, especially the Farm Bureau and debates among Roosevelt's farm advisers such as Secretary of Agriculture Henry A. Wallace, Rexford Tugwell, Lewis C. Gray and George Peek.

== Content ==
The Frazier–Lemke Farm Bankruptcy Act restricted the ability of banks to repossess farms, amended the previously voluntary Section 75, and added subsection (s), which delayed foreclosure of a bankrupt farmer's property for five years during which the farmer made rental payments. The farmer could then buy back the property at its currently-appraised value over six years at 1% interest or remain in possession as a paying tenant.

The S. 3580 bill was named for North Dakota Senator Lynn Frazier and North Dakota Representative William Lemke.

== Amendments to U.S. Bankruptcy Law ==
The 73rd Congress passed legislation in June 1934 to amend the Bankruptcy Act of 1898.

Congressional Amendments for U.S. Bankruptcy Laws

Date of Enactment	Public Law No.	Statute Citation	U.S. Bill No.	U.S. Presidential Administration
7 June 1934	P.L. 73-296	48 Stat. 911	H.R. 5884	Franklin Roosevelt
28 June 1934	P.L. 73-486	48 Stat. 1289	S. 3580	Franklin Roosevelt

== Court case ==
The law was challenged by secured creditors, and by May 1935, the US Supreme Court reviewed the law in Louisville Joint Stock Land Bank v. Radford. The Act was ruled unconstitutional because it deprived secured creditors of their property rights, in violation of the Fifth Amendment.

== Modification and renewal ==
Congress responded by enacting the revised Frazier–Lemke Act and naming it the "Farm Mortgage Moratorium Act" in 1935. The terms were modified to limit the moratorium to a three-year period. The revision also gave secured creditors the opportunity to force a public sale, but the farmer could redeem the sale by paying the same amount.

The law was challenged, but the Supreme Court upheld the law in Wright v. Vinton Branch of Mountain Trust Bank of Roanoke.

After expiring in 1938, the act was renewed four times until 1949, when it expired.

An attempt made by William Lemke to re-pass the original Frazier-Lemke Act in Congress as the refashioned, and even more sweeping, Frazier-Lemke Farm Refinance Act would be thwarted by President Roosevelt, which triggered Lemke's decision to run against Roosevelt in the 1936 United States presidential election on the ticket of the Charles Coughlin-led Union Party.

== See also ==
1933 Banking Act
Chapter 12 of the Bankruptcy Code
Dust Bowl
Federal Declaration of Taking Act of 1931
Great Depression
