= David Swing =

American sermon writer (1830–1894)

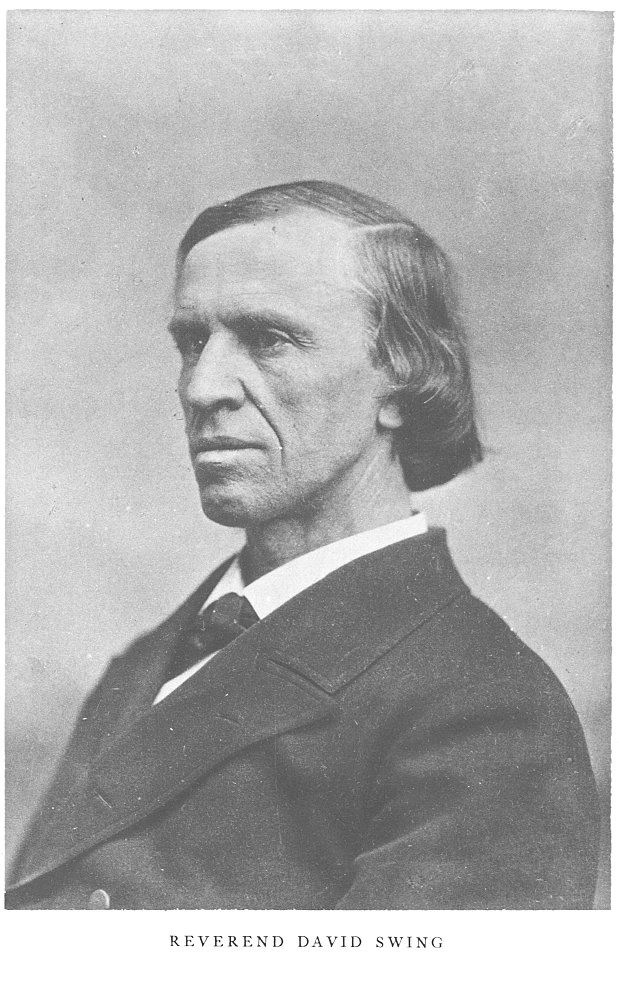
- Born: August 23, 1830; Cincinnati, Ohio, US
- Died: October 3, 1894 (aged 64); Chicago, Illinois, US
- Burial place: Rosehill Cemetery
- Education: Miami University
- Occupation: Clergyman

Signature
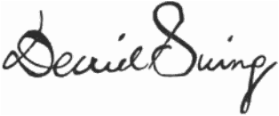

David Swing (August 23, 1830 – October 3, 1894) was a United States teacher and clergyman who was the most popular Chicago preacher of his time.

== Early life ==
Swing was born to Alsatian immigrant parents in Cincinnati, Ohio.

He spent most of his boyhood on a farm and earned his schooling. He graduated from Miami University in 1852, where was Phi Delta Theta fraternity brother of Benjamin Harrison and classmate of Whitelaw Reid. Swing studied theology at Lane Seminary; and was principal of the preparatory school at Miami in 1853-1866.

== Career ==
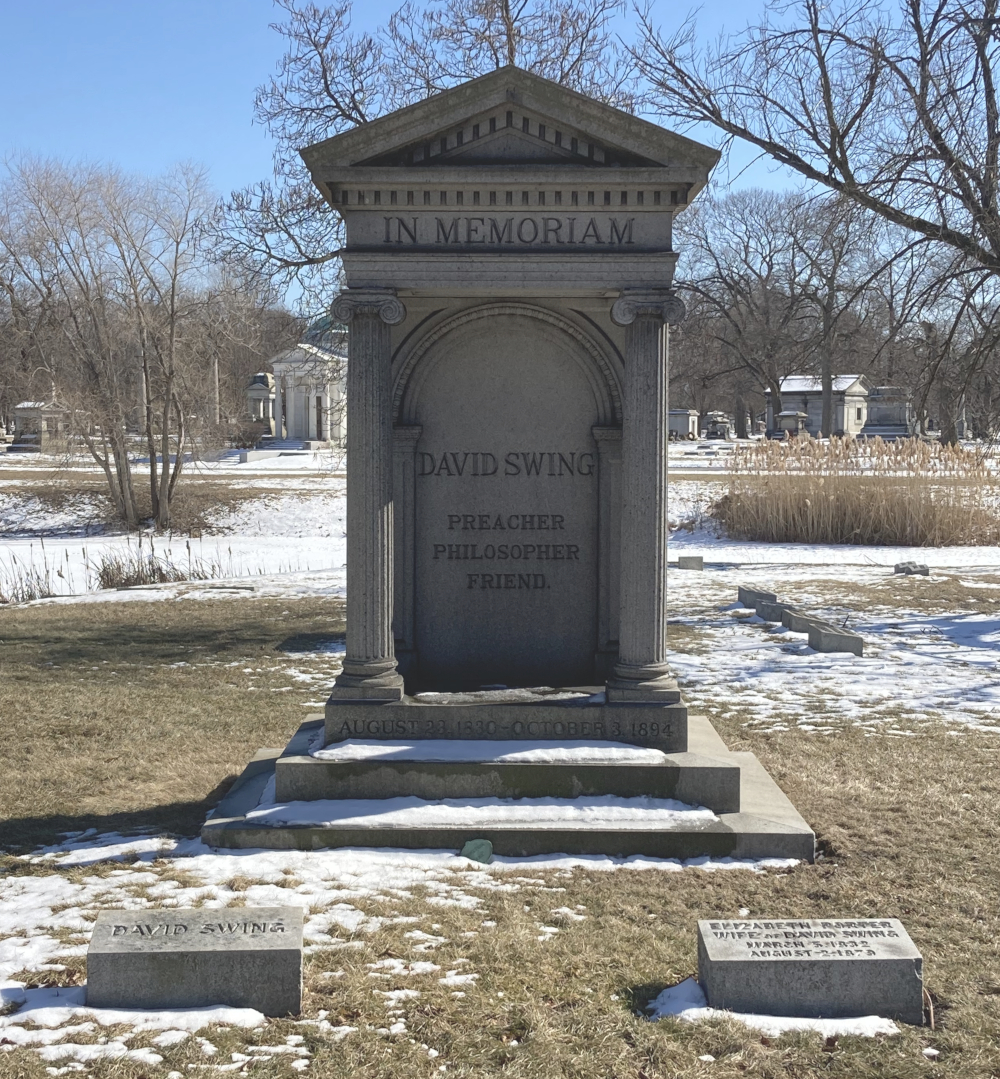
Swing's grave at Rosehill Cemetery

He became pastor in 1866 of the Westminster Presbyterian Church (after 1868 the Fourth Church) in Chicago, which was destroyed in the fire of 1871; he then preached in McVicker's Theatre until 1874, when a new building was completed.

In April 1874, he was tried before the Presbytery of Chicago on charges of heresy preferred by Dr Francis Landey Patton, who argued that Professor Swing preached that men were saved by works, that he held a "modal" Trinity, that he did not believe in plenary inspiration, that he unduly countenanced Unitarianism, etc. The presbytery acquitted Dr. Swing, who resigned from the presbytery when he learned that the case was to be appealed to the synod. As an action was taken against the church, of which he had remained pastor, he resigned the pastorate, again leased McVicker's theatre (and after 1880 leased Central Music Hall, which was built for the purpose), and in 1875 founded the Central Church, to which many of his former parishioners followed him, and in which he built up a large Sunday school, and established a kindergarten, industrial schools, and other charities.

He published Sermons (1874), including most of his "heretical" utterances, Truths for To-day (2 vols, 1874–1876), Motives of Life (1879), and Club Essays (1881).

He died in Chicago on October 3, 1894, and was buried at Rosehill Cemetery.

A residence hall is named in Swing's honor at Miami University.

== See also ==
- Libbie C. Riley Baer (1849–1929), poet
