= Milton, North Dakota =

- City
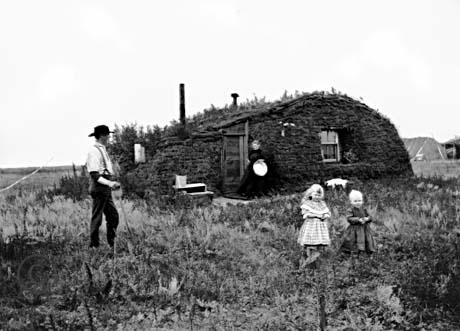
- Settlers in front of their sod house in Milton in 1898

- Location of Milton, North Dakota
- Coordinates: 48°37′33″N 98°02′45″W
- Country: United States
- State: North Dakota
- County: Cavalier
- Founded: 1887

Area
  - Total: 0.47 sq mi (1.22 km^{2})
  - Land: 0.47 sq mi (1.22 km^{2})
  - Water: 0 sq mi (0.00 km^{2})
- Elevation: 1,585 ft (483 m)

Population (2020)
  - Total: 39
  - Estimate (2022): 41
  - Density: 82.8/sq mi (31.97/km^{2})
- Time zone: UTC-6 (Central (CST))
  - Summer (DST): UTC-5 (CDT)
- ZIP code: 58260
- Area code: 701
- FIPS code: 38-53020
- GNIS feature ID: 1036163

Milton is a city in Cavalier County, North Dakota, United States. The population was 39 at the 2020 census. Milton was founded in 1887.

== Geography ==
According to the United States Census Bureau, the city has a total area of 0.51 square miles (1.32 km^{2}), all land.

== Demographics ==
Historical population
Census	Pop.	Note	%±
1890	202		—
1900	384		90.1%
1910	410		6.8%
1920	393		−4.1%
1930	329		−16.3%
1940	310		−5.8%
1950	322		3.9%
1960	264		−18.0%
1970	198		−25.0%
1980	195		−1.5%
1990	133		−31.8%
2000	85		−36.1%
2010	58		−31.8%
2020	39		−32.8%
2022 (est.)	41		5.1%
U.S. Decennial Census; 2020 Census

=== 2010 census ===
As of the census of 2010, there were 58 people, 28 households, and 17 families living in the city. The population density was 113.7 inhabitants per square mile (43.9/km^{2}). There were 40 housing units at an average density of 78.4 per square mile (30.3/km^{2}). The racial makeup of the city was 96.6% White and 3.4% Native American.

There were 28 households, of which 14.3% had children under the age of 18 living with them, 50.0% were married couples living together, 3.6% had a female householder with no husband present, 7.1% had a male householder with no wife present, and 39.3% were non-families. 17.9% of all households were made up of individuals, and 7.1% had someone living alone who was 65 years of age or older. The average household size was 2.07 and the average family size was 2.35.

The median age in the city was 50 years. 8.6% of residents were under the age of 18; 6.8% were between the ages of 18 and 24; 22.4% were from 25 to 44; 39.7% were from 45 to 64; and 22.4% were 65 years of age or older. The gender makeup of the city was 48.3% male and 51.7% female.

=== 2000 census ===
As of the census of 2000, there were 85 people, 40 households, and 22 families living in the city. The population density was 214.8 inhabitants per square mile (82.9/km^{2}). There were 60 housing units at an average density of 151.7 per square mile (58.6/km^{2}). The racial makeup of the city was 90.59% White, 2.35% Native American, and 7.06% from two or more races. Hispanic or Latino of any race were 3.53% of the population.

There were 40 households, out of which 25.0% had children under the age of 18 living with them, 45.0% were married couples living together, 7.5% had a female householder with no husband present, and 45.0% were non-families. 45.0% of all households were made up of individuals, and 27.5% had someone living alone who was 65 years of age or older. The average household size was 2.13 and the average family size was 3.00.

In the city, the population was spread out, with 25.9% under the age of 18, 3.5% from 18 to 24, 30.6% from 25 to 44, 20.0% from 45 to 64, and 20.0% who were 65 years of age or older. The median age was 40 years. For every 100 females, there were 97.7 males. For every 100 females age 18 and over, there were 90.9 males.

The median income for a household in the city was $33,542, and the median income for a family was $36,250. Males had a median income of $30,417 versus $48,750 for females. The per capita income for the city was $14,682. There were 13.6% of families and 11.4% of the population living below the poverty line, including 14.8% of under eighteens and 16.7% of those over 64.

== Notable people ==
- Henry T. Helgesen (1857–1917), U.S. representative from North Dakota
