= North Dakota's 1st congressional district =

- Obsolete district
- Created: 1910; 1960
- Eliminated: 1930; 1970
- Years active: 1913-1933

North Dakota's 1st congressional district is an obsolete congressional district in the state of North Dakota that existed from 1913 to 1933, and from 1963 to 1973.

== History ==
Prior to 1913, North Dakota elected two members of the United States House of Representatives at-large. Following the 1910 census, reapportionment gave North Dakota another seat and beginning with the 1912 congressional elections, North Dakota divided its delegation into three districts.

Following the 1930 census, North Dakota lost a seat and returned to electing two members at-large in 1933. In 1963, the state divided into two congressional districts. Following the 1970 redistricting cycle after the 1970 United States census, North Dakota lost another seat, and since 1973, has had only one member, elected at-large.

== List of members representing the district ==
Representative	Party	Years	Cong ress	Electoral history
District established March 4, 1913
Henry T. Helgesen (Milton)	Republican	March 4, 1913 – April 10, 1917	63rd 64th 65th	Redistricted from the at-large district and re-elected in 1912. Re-elected in 1914. Re-elected in 1916. Died.
Vacant		April 10, 1917 – August 10, 1917	65th	
John M. Baer (Fargo)	Nonpartisan League	August 10, 1917 – March 3, 1921	65th 66th	Elected to finish Helgesen's term. Re-elected in 1918. Lost re-election.
Olger B. Burtness (Grand Forks)	Republican	March 4, 1921 – March 3, 1933	67th 68th 69th 70th 71st 72nd	Elected in 1920. Re-elected in 1922. Re-elected in 1924. Re-elected in 1926. Re-elected in 1928. Re-elected in 1930. Redistricted to the at-large district and lost renomination.
District dissolved March 4, 1933
District re-established January 3, 1963
Hjalmar C. Nygaard (Enderlin)	Republican	January 3, 1963 – July 18, 1963	88th	Redistricted from the at-large district and re-elected in 1962. Died.
Vacant		July 18, 1963 – October 30, 1963	88th	
Mark Andrews (Mapleton)	Republican	October 30, 1963 – January 3, 1973	88th 89th 90th 91st 92nd	Elected to finish Nygaard's term. Re-elected in 1964. Re-elected in 1966. Re-elected in 1968. Re-elected in 1970. Redistricted to the at-large district.
District dissolved January 3, 1973

== Election results ==
Year	Candidate	Party	Votes	%
1912 (63rd Congress)	Henry T. Helgesen	Republican	17,156	61.1
1912 (63rd Congress)	V. R. Lovell	Democratic	9,609	34.2
1912 (63rd Congress)	Leon Durocher	Socialist	1,310	4.7
1914 (64th Congress)	Henry T. Helgesen	Republican	16,565	56.0
1914 (64th Congress)	Fred Bartholomew	Democratic	12,217	41.3
1914 (64th Congress)	Leon Durocher	Socialist	812	2.7
1916 (65th Congress)	Henry T. Helgesen	Republican	20,709	59.9
1916 (65th Congress)	George A. Bangs	Democratic	13,236	38.3
1916 (65th Congress)	V. Gram	Socialist	622	1.8
July 10, 1917 special election (65th Congress)	John M. Baer	NPL	13,211	50.9
July 10, 1917 special election (65th Congress)	Olger B. Burtness	Republican	8,969	34.6
July 10, 1917 special election (65th Congress)	George A. Bangs	Democratic	3,276	12.6
July 10, 1917 special election (65th Congress)	Hans H. Aaker	Progressive	212	0.8
July 10, 1917 special election (65th Congress)	Frederic T. Cuthbert	Republican	118	0.5
July 10, 1917 special election (65th Congress)	Henry G. Vick	Republican	75	0.3
July 10, 1917 special election (65th Congress)	Charles Plain	Republican	72	0.3
1918 (66th Congress)	John M. Baer	Republican-NPL	16,433	55.1
1918 (66th Congress)	Fred Bartholomew	Democratic	13,416	44.9
1920 (67th Congress)	Olger B. Burtness	Republican	43,530	57.6
1920 (67th Congress)	John M. Baer	NPL	32,072	42.4
1922 (68th Congress)	Olger B. Burtness	Republican	45,959	100.0
1924 (69th Congress)	Olger B. Burtness	Republican	44,573	75.4
1924 (69th Congress)	Walter Welford	Democratic	14,511	24.6
1926 (70th Congress)	Olger B. Burtness	Republican	37,326	79.9
1926 (70th Congress)	R. E. Smith	Democratic	6,136	13.1
1926 (70th Congress)	Donald McDonald	Farmer–Labor	3,246	7.0
1928 (71st Congress)	Olger B. Burtness	Republican	53,941	77.5
1928 (71st Congress)	W. S. Hooper	Democratic	15,646	22.5
1930 (72nd Congress)	Olger B. Burtness	Republican	42,598	75.0
1930 (72nd Congress)	J. E. Garvey	Democratic	14,208	25.0
1962 (88th Congress)	Hjalmar C. Nygaard	Republican	61,330	54.6
1962 (88th Congress)	Scott Anderson	Democratic-NPL	50,924	45.4
October 22, 1963 special election (88th Congress)	Mark Andrews	Republican	47,062	49.1
October 22, 1963 special election (88th Congress)	John Hove	Democratic-NPL	42,470	44.3
October 22, 1963 special election (88th Congress)	John W. Scott	Conservative Republican	5,995	6.3
October 22, 1963 special election (88th Congress)	Thomas W. Dewey	Independent	337	0.4
1964 (89th Congress)	Mark Andrews	Republican	69,575	52.1
1964 (89th Congress)	George A. Sinner	Democratic-NPL	63,208	47.4
1964 (89th Congress)	Eugene Van Der Hoeven	Independent	427	0.3
1964 (89th Congress)	Roger Vorachek	Independent	232	0.2
1966 (90th Congress)	Mark Andrews	Republican	66,011	66.2
1966 (90th Congress)	Sebastian F. Hoffner	Democratic-NPL	33,694	33.8
1968 (91st Congress)	Mark Andrews	Republican	84,114	71.9
1968 (91st Congress)	Bruce Hagen	Democratic-NPL	30,692	26.2
1968 (91st Congress)	Rosemary Landsberger	Independent	2,166	1.9
1970 (92nd Congress)	Mark Andrews	Republican	72,168	65.7
1970 (92nd Congress)	James E. Brooks	Democratic-NPL	37,688	34.3
