= Hjalmar Nygaard (politician) =

American politician (1906–1963)

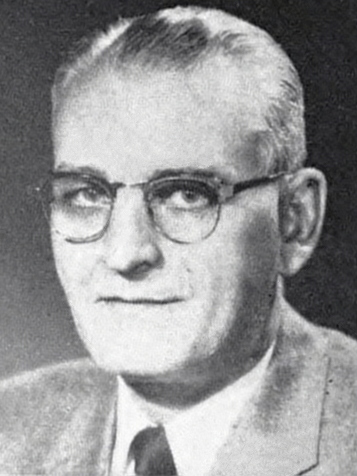

Member of the U.S. House of Representatives from North Dakota
- In office January 3, 1961 – July 18, 1963
- Preceded by: Quentin Burdick
- Succeeded by: Mark Andrews
- Constituency: At-large district (1961–1963); 1st district (1963)

Member of the North Dakota House of Representatives from the 14th district
- In office 1949–1960

Personal details
- Born: March 24, 1906 Sharon, North Dakota, U.S.
- Died: July 18, 1963 (aged 57) Washington, D.C., U.S.
- Party: Republican

Hjalmar Carl Nygaard (March 24, 1906 – July 18, 1963) was an American politician. He represented North Dakota in the United States House of Representatives as a Republican from 1961 until his death in 1963.

== Background ==
Nygaard was born on a farm near Sharon, Steele County, North Dakota. He was one of eight children born to Carl Nygaard and Anna Karene Grimson who had relocated from Decorah, Iowa. He attended the public schools of Sharon, Mayville State Teachers College and the University of North Dakota.

== Career ==
Nygaard taught in the rural schools of Emmons and Steele counties from 1932 to 1935 and was engaged in the grocery and hardware businesses from 1936 to 1960.

He served as mayor of Sharon and as a member of the school board and then as member of the North Dakota House of Representatives from 1949 to 1960. He served as majority leader of that body in 1955 and 1957 and as speaker in 1959. He was a member of the National Monument Commission from 1961 to 1963.

In 1960, Nygaard was elected to the United States House of Representatives as a Republican, one of two representatives from North Dakota's at-large congressional district. Starting in 1962, the state moved from an at-large district to two separate geographic districts, and Nygaard was elected to represent North Dakota's 1st congressional district. In all, he served in the chamber from January 3, 1961, until his death on July 18, 1963.

On July 18, 1963, Nygaard entered the United States Capitol office of Dr. George W. Calver, physician to Congress, complaining of chest pains. Nygaard then died of a heart attack in Calver's office. He was buried in City Cemetery in Enderlin, North Dakota.

== See also ==
- List of members of the United States Congress who died in office (1950–1999)

U.S. House of Representatives
Preceded by Quentin N. Burdick	Member of the U.S. House of Representatives from North Dakota's at-large congressional district January 3, 1961 – January 3, 1963	Succeeded by None; seat abolished
Preceded by New district	Member of the U.S. House of Representatives from North Dakota's 1st congressional district January 3, 1963 – July 18, 1963	Succeeded by Mark Andrews
