= William Lemke =

American politician (1878–1950)

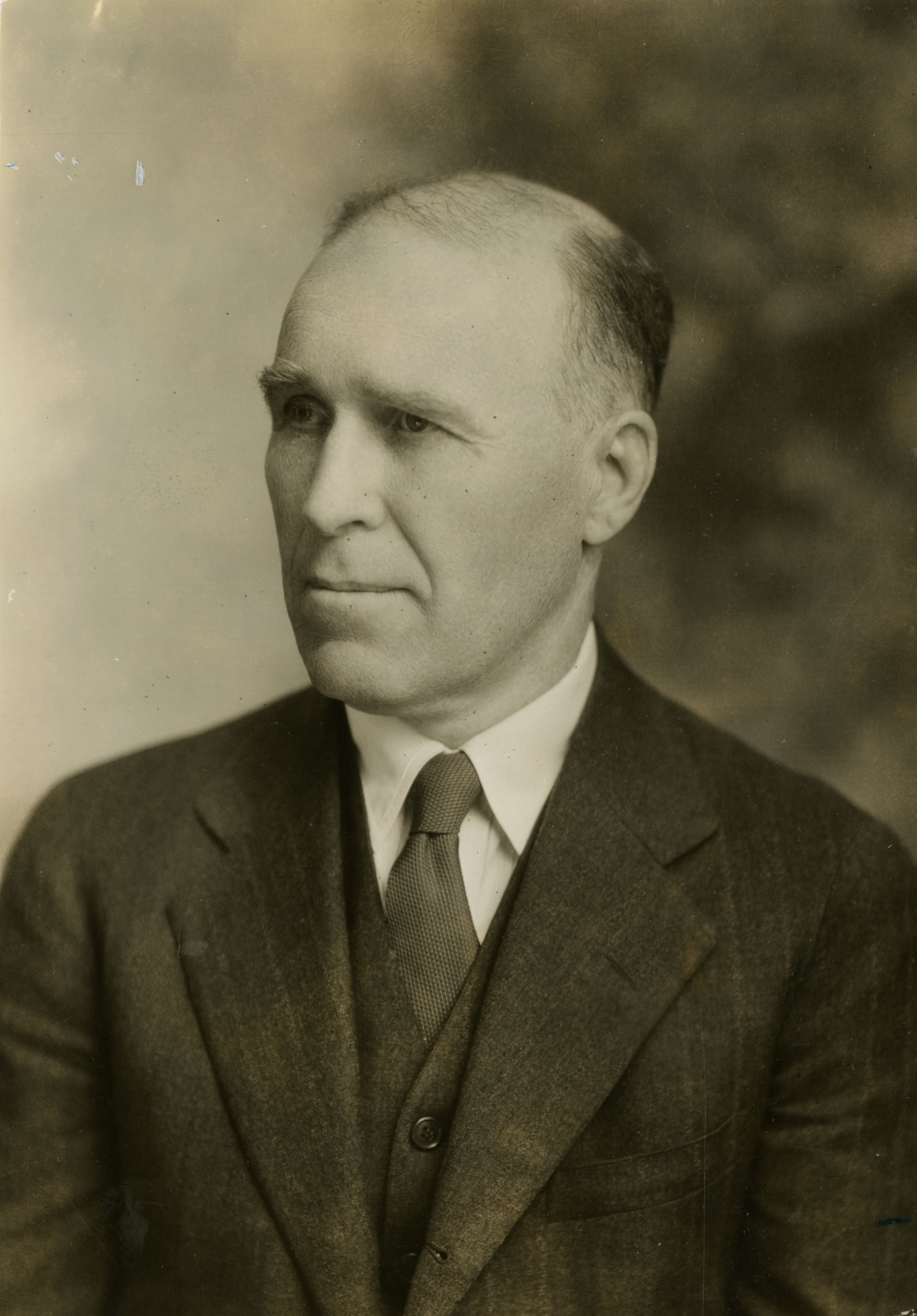
- Lemke c. 1930s

Member of the U.S. House of Representatives from North Dakota's at-large district
- In office January 3, 1943 – May 30, 1950
- Preceded by: Charles R. Robertson
- Succeeded by: Fred G. Aandahl
- In office March 4, 1933 – January 3, 1941
- Preceded by: Olger B. Burtness
- Succeeded by: Charles R. Robertson

11th Attorney General of North Dakota
- In office January 5, 1921 – November 23, 1921
- Governor: Lynn Frazier
- Preceded by: William Langer
- Succeeded by: Sveinbjorn Johnson

Personal details
- Born: William Frederick Lemke; August 13, 1878 Albany, Minnesota, U.S.
- Died: May 30, 1950 (aged 71) Fargo, North Dakota, U.S.
- Party: Republican (NPL faction); Independent (1940); Union (1935–1936); Progressive (1912)
- Spouse: Isabelle McIntyre
- Children: 3
- Education: University of North Dakota (BA); Georgetown University; Yale University (LLB)

William Frederick Lemke (August 13, 1878 – May 30, 1950) was an American attorney and politician from North Dakota. He represented that state in the United States House of Representatives for eight terms as a member of the Nonpartisan League and the North Dakota Republican Party. In the 1936 presidential election, he was the nominee of the national Union Party, finishing third behind Democratic incumbent Franklin D. Roosevelt and Republican challenger Alf Landon.

== Early life and education ==
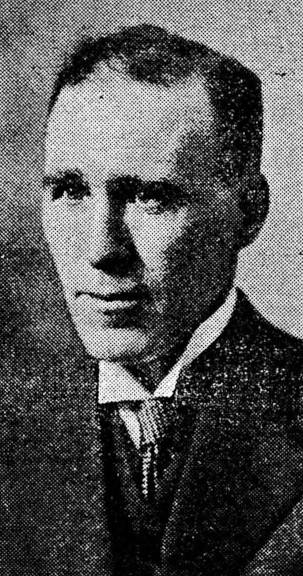
Lemke c. 1916

William Frederick Lemke was born on August 13, 1878 in Albany, Minnesota to Fred Lemke and Julia Anna Kleir. He was raised in Towner County, North Dakota, where his parents were pioneer farmers who owned some 2,700 acres (11 km^{2}) of land. As a boy, As a boy, Lemke worked long hours on the family farm, attending a common school for only three months in the summers. He lost his eye in an accident.

His family reserved enough money to send him to the University of North Dakota, where he was not only a superior student, but also well known for his ability to impersonate the professors. He graduated in 1902. He attended law school for one year before moving to Georgetown University and then Yale Law School, where finished his law degree and won the praise of the dean. He returned to his home state in 1905 to set up a practice at Fargo.

== Political career ==
During the 1910s, the Nonpartisan League (NPL) was formed and quickly gained significant traction in North Dakota. Lemke was heavily involved and quickly became one of its top leaders. He is considered by many to be the brains of the operation, often being called the "bishop" or "political bishop" of the NPL.

=== State politics ===
In 1920, Lemke was elected attorney general of North Dakota, although this violated the rule set by NPL leader A. C. Townley against NPL leaders running for office. By this time, the NPL was plagued with infighting and controversies and public support was declining. In 1921, a special recall election initiated by opponents of the NPL, the Independent Voters Association (IVA), successfully removed all three NPL members of the North Dakota Industrial Commission, including Lemke, from office and replaced them with IVA candidates. However, Lemke remained popular. In 1922, he received the NPL nomination for governor, but he was defeated by incumbent Ragnvald Nestos.

=== United States House of Representatives (1933–41) ===
In 1932, he was elected to the United States House of Representatives. He also campaigned for Franklin D. Roosevelt for president in North Dakota and other Midwestern states.

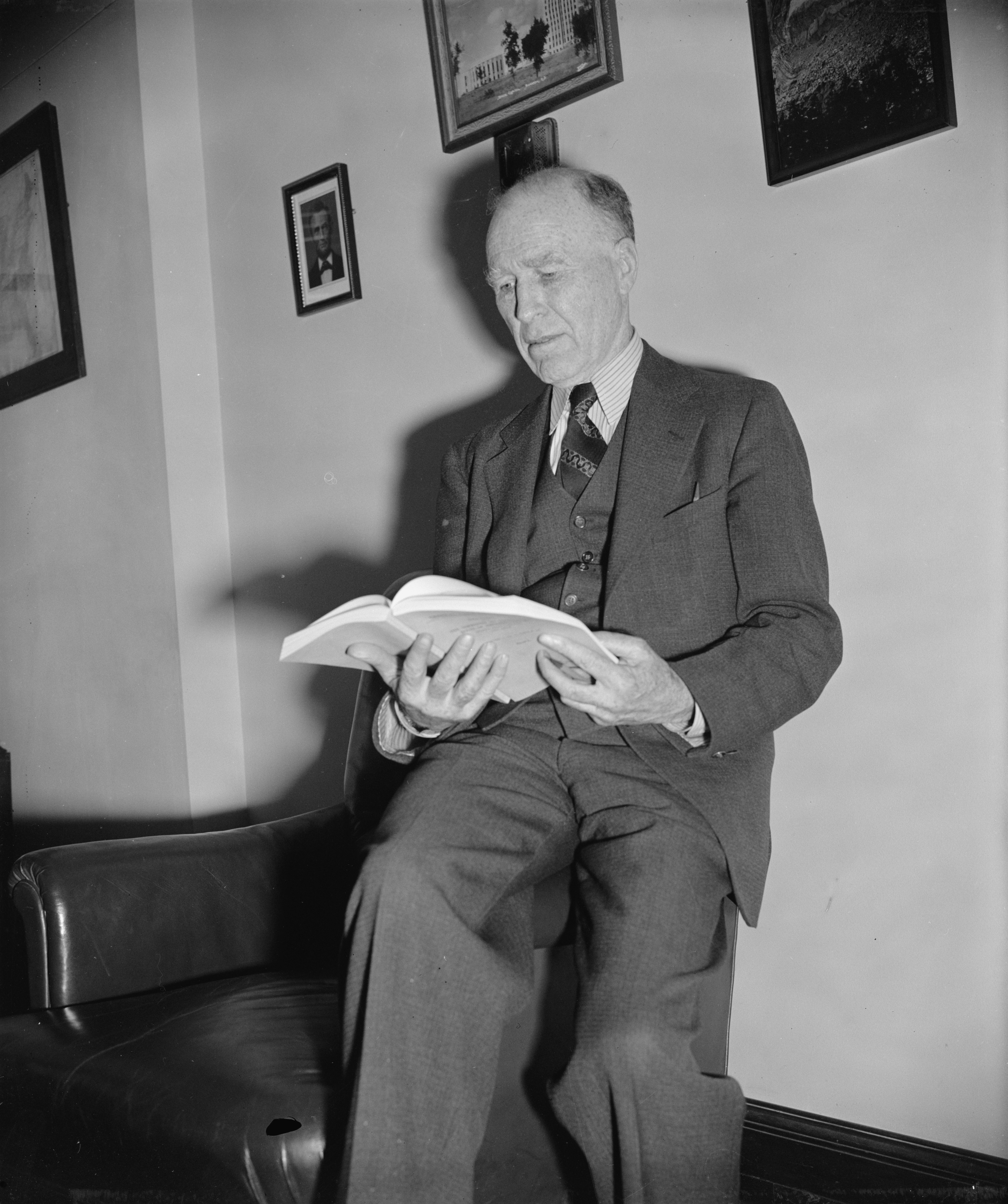
Lemke in 1939

While in Congress, Lemke earned a reputation as a progressive populist and supporter of the New Deal, championing the causes of family farmers and co-sponsoring legislation to protect farmers against foreclosures.

In 1934, Lemke co-sponsored the Frazier–Lemke Farm Bankruptcy Act, restricting the ability of banks to repossess farms. Roosevelt signed the act into law on June 28, 1934, but the Act was later struck down by the Supreme Court in Louisville Joint Stock Land Bank v. Radford (1935). Lemke attempted to pass the legislation again with even more sweeping reforms, as the Frazier–Lemke Farm Refinance Act, but he was now opposed by the Roosevelt administration. The Act was eventually re-passed as the Farm Mortgage Moratorium Act, which lowered the initial Act's five-year moratorium on repossessing farms to three years and was later held constitutional by the Supreme Court. The Act was renewed five times until finally expiring in 1949.

Lemke was a political friend and ally of Louisiana populist Huey Long prior to his assassination in 1935.

=== 1936 presidential campaign ===
In June 1936, Lemke accepted the nomination of the Union Party, a short-lived third party, as its candidate for president of the United States. Many believe Lemke's acceptance of the Union Party nomination in 1936 was a reaction against Roosevelt's opposition to his farm mortgage bill. Through the Union Party, Lemke befriended Charles Coughlin, a controversial Catholic radio priest and founder of the Union Party. Coughlin predicted that Lemke would receive at least 9 million votes. However, Lemke only received 892,378 votes, just under two percent of the vote nationally. While he won no electoral votes, Lemke outpolled Republican nominee Alf Landon in six North Dakota counties and remained the last candidate to outpoll a major-party nominee for president in any county outside of the former Confederate states until 1968. (Note: These six were Bottineau County, Burke County, Divide County, Mountrail County, Towner County and Williams County.) (Note: During this era, the political impact of Civil Rights Movement meant unpledged and "Dixiecrat" nominees frequently outpolled one or both major-party nominees in the Deep South and occasionally elsewhere in antebellum slave states.) He was simultaneously reelected to the House as a Republican.

=== 1940 United States Senate campaign ===
In 1940, having already received the Republican nomination for a fifth House term, he withdrew to launch an unsuccessful independent run for United States Senate.

=== Second stint in U.S. House (1943–50) ===
He ran again for the House in 1942 as a Republican and served four more terms until his death in 1950.

From 1943 to 1948, Lemke was the champion for establishment of the Theodore Roosevelt National Memorial Park (now Theodore Roosevelt National Park). The National Park Service did not support this proposal. Lemke was not considered an admirer of Theodore Roosevelt, but he appears to have pursued the park for the economic benefits it might bring to the region. His efforts were ultimately successful, and the park was established by act of Congress in June 1948.

== Personal life ==
Lemke was a Freemason.

Former Atlanta Braves baseball player Mark Lemke is Lemke's second cousin twice removed.

== Death and burial ==
Lemke died of a heart attack in Fargo, North Dakota on May 30, 1950 and is buried in Riverside Cemetery.

== Bibliography ==
- Edward C. Blackorby. "William Lemke: Agrarian Radical and Union Party Presidential Candidate," The Mississippi Valley Historical Review, Vol. 49, No. 1. (Jun., 1962), pp. 67–84. Available on JSTOR.
- William Lemke Papers at The University of North Dakota.
- "Lemke, William" in American National Biography. American Council of Learned Societies, 2000.

== See also ==
- List of members of the United States Congress who died in office (1950–1999)

== Notes ==
Legal offices
Preceded by William Langer	Attorney General of North Dakota; 1921–1922	Succeeded by Sveinbjorn Johnson
U.S. House of Representatives
Preceded by Olger B. Burtness	Member of the U.S. House of Representatives from North Dakota's at-large congressional district 1933–1941	Succeeded by Charles R. Robertson
Preceded by Charles R. Robertson	Member of the U.S. House of Representatives from North Dakota's at-large congressional district 1943–1950	Succeeded by Fred G. Aandahl
Party political offices
Preceded by William Langer	Republican nominee for North Dakota Attorney General; 1920	Succeeded by Sveinbjorn Johnson
First	Nonpartisan League nominee for North Dakota Attorney General; 1921	Succeeded by J. H. Ulsrud
Preceded by Lynn Frazier	Nonpartisan League nominee for Governor of North Dakota; 1922	Vacant Title next held by William Langer
New political party	Union nominee for President of the United States; 1936	Party dissolved
