= Henry T. Helgesen =

American politician (1857–1917)

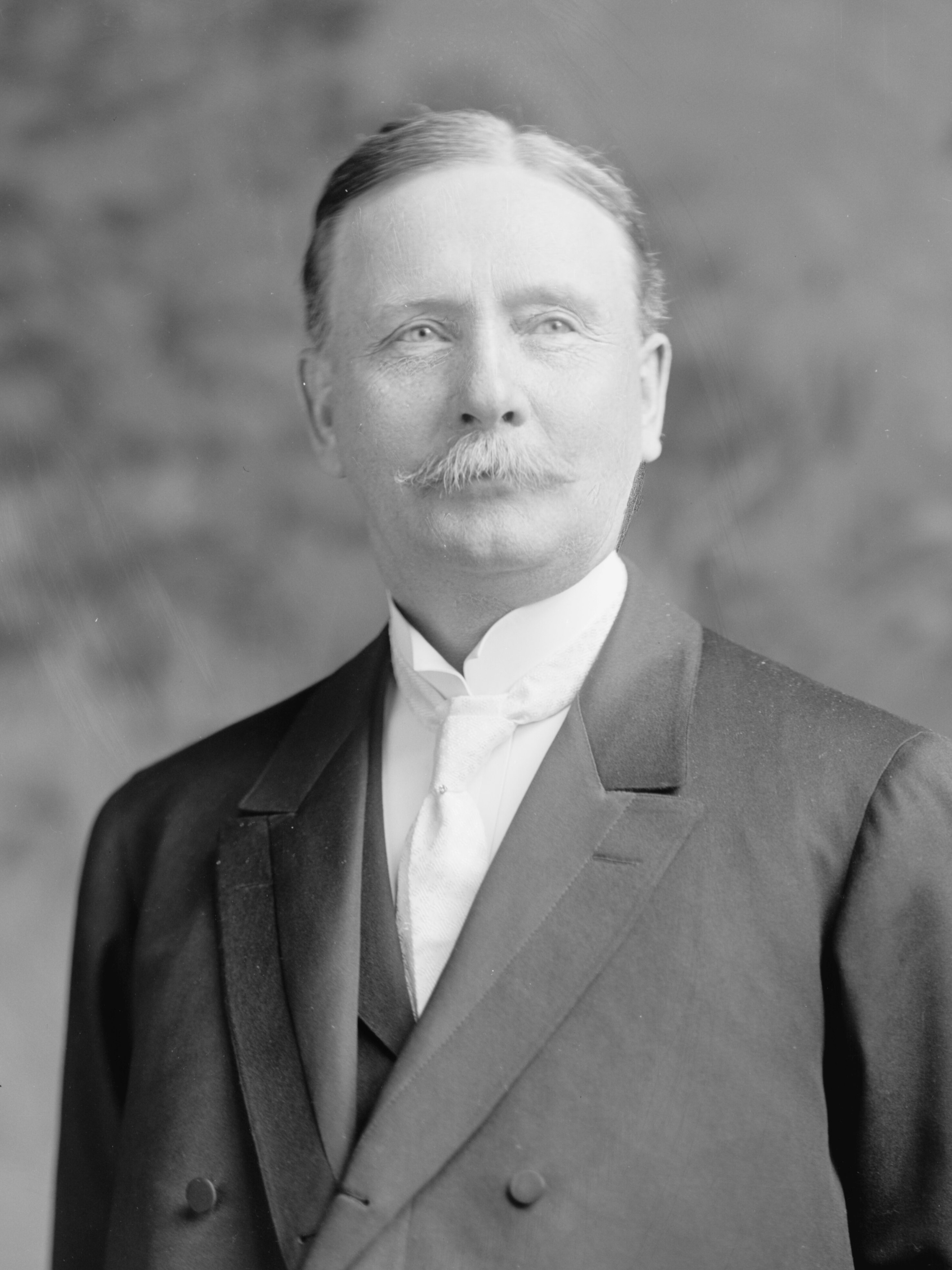

Member of the U.S. House of Representatives from North Dakota
- In office March 4, 1911 – April 10, 1917
- Preceded by: Asle Gronna
- Succeeded by: John M. Baer
- Constituency: At-large district (1911–1913); 1st district (1913–1917)

President of the Milton, North Dakota Board of Education
- In office 1893–1894

North Dakota Commissioner of Agriculture and Labor
- In office 1889–1892
- Governor: John Miller; Andrew H. Burke
- Preceded by: Office established
- Succeeded by: Nelson Williams

Personal details
- Born: June 26, 1857 near Decorah, Iowa, U.S.
- Died: April 10, 1917 (aged 59) Washington, D.C., U.S.
- Party: Republican

Henry Thomas Helgesen (June 26, 1857 – April 10, 1917) was a U.S. representative from North Dakota.

== Biography ==
Born near Decorah, Iowa, Helgesen attended the public schools, the John Breckenridge Normal Institute, and the J.R. Slack Business College at Decorah. He moved to Milton, Dakota Territory (now North Dakota), in 1887.

He engaged in the mercantile and lumber business and also in agricultural pursuits. He served as the North Dakota commissioner of agriculture and labor from 1889 and 1892; the first to hold the office. He served as member of the board of education of Milton from 1893 to 1896, serving as president of the board in 1893 and 1894. He served as member of the board of regents of the University of North Dakota between 1897 and 1901, and again between 1907 and 1913. He was an unsuccessful candidate for election to the Sixty-first Congress in 1908.

Helgesen was elected as a Republican to the Sixty-second and to the three succeeding Congresses and served from March 4, 1911, until his death in Washington, D.C., on April 10, 1917.

He was interred in Phelps Cemetery in his hometown of Decorah.

The most notable action of Helgesen in his congressional career was that he was a key figure between 1911 and 1916 in Congressional activity in support of the claims of Dr. Frederick Cook with regard to being the first explorer to reach the North Pole, and a corresponding demand to take back the promotion of Robert Peary to the rank of rear admiral. Research by William R. Hunt into this matter showed that Helgesen's staff in Washington included an aide, Ernest C. Rost, who was a professional photographer and a friend of Dr. Cook. Later it turned out that Rost was a hired lobbyist for Cook. Helgesen read into the Congressional Record of 1915 published pamphlets and newspaper articles in support of Cook. However, a year later Cook went on a trip to Asia, and Helgesen denounced Cook as a fraud. It cannot be ascertained if there is any connection but Cook was being sued for non-payment of salary owed to Rost at this time. Further activity by Helgesen ended with his death in April 1917.

== See also ==
- List of members of the United States Congress who died in office (1900–1949)

== Sources ==
- United States Congress. "Henry T. Helgesen (id: H000459)". Biographical Directory of the United States Congress.
- Henry T. Helgesen, late a representative from North Dakota, Memorial addresses delivered in the House of Representatives and Senate frontispiece 1919
- William R. Hunt To Stand at the Pole: The Dr. Cook - Admiral Peary North Pole Controversy (New York: Stein & Day, 1981) illus. p. 162, 167–169, 199. ISBN 0-8128-2773-2

Political offices
Preceded by none	North Dakota Commissioner of Agriculture and Labor; 1889–1892	Succeeded by Nelson Williams
U.S. House of Representatives
Preceded by Asle Gronna	Member of the U.S. House of Representatives from North Dakota's at-large congressional district 1911 – 1913	Succeeded by Seat abolished
Preceded by Seat established	Member of the U.S. House of Representatives from North Dakota's 1st congressional district 1913–1917	Succeeded by John Miller Baer
