= List of majority leaders of the North Dakota House of Representatives =

The following is a list of majority leaders of the North Dakota House of Representatives, a position that was created in 1930 and first filled in 1931.

Number of North Dakota House majority leaders by party affiliation
| Party | Leaders |
|---|---|
| Republican | 22 |
| Republican | 17 |
| Republican/NPL | 3 |
| Republican/IVA | 2 |
| Democratic | 2 |
| Democratic-NPL | 2 |

| # | Name | Term | Party | District |
|---|---|---|---|---|
| 1 | Luther L. Twichell | 1931–1932 | Republican-IVA | 9 |
| 2 | Herbert F. Swett | 1933–1934 | Republican/NPL | 35 |
| 3 | William J. Godwin | 1935–1938 | Republican/NPL | 30 |
| 4 | Reuben R. Scholl | 1939–1940 | Republican/NPL | 46 |
| 5 | Luther L. Twichell | 1941–1944 | Republican-IVA | 9 |
| 6 | Vernon M. Johnson | 1945–1946 | Republican | 12 |
| 7 | Winfred M. Smart | 1947–1948 | Republican | 29 |
| 8 | Arthur C. Johnson | 1949–1950 | Republican | 9 |
| 9 | Roy A. Holand | 1951–1954 | Republican | 24 |
| 10 | Hjalmar Carl Nygaard | 1955–1958 | Republican | 14 |
| 11 | Ben J. Wolf | 1959–1962 | Republican | 36 |
| 12 | Don Halcrow | 1963–1964 | Republican | 1 |
| 13 | Donald Griffey | 1965–1966 | Democratic-NPL | 46 |
| 14 | Bryce Streibel | 1967–1974 | Republican | 14 |
| 15 | Earl Strinden | 1975–1982 | Republican | 18 |
| 16 | Richard J. Backes | 1983–1984 | Democratic-NPL | 3 |
| 17 | Earl Strinden | 1985–1988 | Republican | 18 |
| 18 | Richard W. Kloubec | 1989–1992 | Republican | 51 |
| 20 | Robert W. Martinson | 1993–1994 | Republican | 49 |
| 21 | John Dorso | 1995–2000 | Republican | 46 |
| 22 | Wesley Belter | 2001–2002 | Republican | 22 |
| 23 | Rick Berg | 2003–2008 | Republican | 45 |
| 24 | Al Carlson | 2009–2018 | Republican | 41 |
| 25 | Chet Pollert | 2019–2022 | Republican | 29 |
| 25 | Mike Lefor | 2023–present | Republican | 37 |

== See also ==
- List of North Dakota Legislative Assemblies
