= List of speakers of the North Dakota House of Representatives =

The following is a list of speakers of the North Dakota House of Representatives, a position that was created with the state's constitution in 1889. The term indicated is the year of the legislative session in which the individual served as speaker. It is customary for the Speaker to serve for only one session. The Speaker is chosen from the party that has the majority in the given session.

| # | Name | Term | Party | District |
|---|---|---|---|---|
| 1 | David B. Wellman | 1889 | Republican | 22 |
| 2 | William B. Allen | 1891 | Republican | 25 |
| 3 | George H. Walsh | 1893 | Republican | 6 |
| 4 | James C. Gill | 1895 | Republican | 11 |
| 5 | Erastus A. Williams | 1897 | Republican | 27 |
| 6 | Thomas Baker, Jr. | 1899 | Republican | 9 |
| 7 | Robert M. Pollock | 1901 | Republican | 9 |
| 8 | Thomas Baker, Jr. | 1903 | Republican | 9 |
| 9 | George Piercy | 1905 | Republican | 23 |
| 10 | Treadwell Twichell | 1907 | Republican | 10 |
| 11 | Usher L. Burdick | 1909 | Republican | 18 |
| 12 | James M. Hanley | 1911 | Republican | 30 |
| 13 | John H. Fraine | 1913 | Republican | 4 |
| 14 | Alfred P. Hanson | 1915 | Republican | 38 |
| 15 | Howard R. Wood | 1917 | Republican | 29 |
| 16 | L. L. Stair | 1919 | Republican | 28 |
| 17 | Luther L. Twichell | 1921 | Republican | 9 |
| 18 | Roy Johnson | 1923 | Republican | 10 |
| 19 | Ben C. Larkin | 1925 | Republican | 32 |
| 20 | John W. Carr | 1927 | Republican | 23 |
| 21 | Edwin Traynor | 1929 | Republican | 21 |
| 22 | Charles V. Freeman | 1931 | Republican | 6 |
| 23 | Minnie D. Craig | 1933 | Republican-NPL | 20 |
| 24 | William Crockett | 1935 | Republican-NPL | 18 |
| 25 | Math Dahl | 1937 | Republican-NPL | 26 |
| 26 | Oscar W. Hagen | 1939 | Republican-NPL | 41 |
| 27 | Earl D. Symington | 1941 | Republican | 1 |
| 28 | Ralph Beede | 1943 | Republican | 47 |
| 29 | A. R. Bergesen | 1945 | Republican | 9 |
| 30 | Vernon M. Johnson | 1947 | Republican | 12 |
| 31 | Palmer Levin | 1949 | Republican | 3 |
| 32 | Leo Sticka | 1951 | Republican | 31 |
| 33 | Walter Bubel | 1953 | Republican | 48 |
| 34 | Kenneth A. Fitch | 1955 | Republican | 9 |
| 35 | Ben J. Wolf | 1957 | Republican | 36 |
| 36 | Hjalmar C. Nygaard | 1959 | Republican | 14 |
| 37 | R. Fay Brown | 1961 | Republican | 27 |
| 38 | Stanley Saugstad | 1963 | Republican | 29 |
| 39 | Arthur A. Link | 1965 | Democratic-NPL | 41 |
| 40 | Gordon S. Aamoth | 1967 | Republican | 21 |
| 41 | Ernest Norman Johnson | 1969 | Republican | 23 |
| 42 | Howard Bier | 1971 | Republican | 31 |
| 43 | Art Bunker | 1973 | Republican | 21 |
| 44 | Robert F. Reimers | 1975 | Republican | 29 |
| 45 | Oscar Solberg | 1977 | Democratic-NPL | 9 |
| 46 | Vernon E. Wagner | 1979 | Republican | 47 |
| 47 | James A. Peterson | 1981 | Republican | 40 |
| 48 | Patricia Kelly | 1983 | Democratic-NPL | 21 |
| 49 | LeRoy Hausauer | 1985 | Republican | 25 |
| 50 | Richard W. Kloubec | 1987 | Republican | 51 |
| 51 | William Kretschmar | 1989 | Republican | 28 |
| 52 | Ronald A. Anderson | 1991 | Republican | 39 |
| 53 | Rick Berg | 1993 | Republican | 45 |
| 54 | Clarence Martin | 1995 | Republican | 55 |
| 55 | Mike Timm | 1997 | Republican | 5 |
| 56 | Francis J. Wald | 1999 | Republican | 37 |
| 57 | LeRoy G. Bernstein | 2001 | Republican | 45 |
| 58 | Janet Wentz | 2003 | Republican | 3 |
| 59 | Matthew Klein | 2005 | Republican | 40 |
| 60 | Jeff Delzer | 2007 | Republican | 8 |
| 61 | David Monson | 2009 | Republican | 10 |
| 62 | David Drovdal | 2011 | Republican | 39 |
| 63 | Bill Devlin | 2013 | Republican | 23 |
| 64 | Wesley Belter | 2015 | Republican | 22 |
| 65 | Larry Bellew | 2017 | Republican | 38 |
| 66 | Lawrence Klemin | 2019 | Republican | 47 |
| 67 | Kim Koppelman | 2021 | Republican | 13 |
| 68 | Dennis Johnson | 2023 | Republican | 15 |
| 69 | Robin Weisz | 2025 | Republican | 14 |

== See also ==
- List of North Dakota Legislative Assemblies
