= Ben Koppelman =

American politician (born 1980)

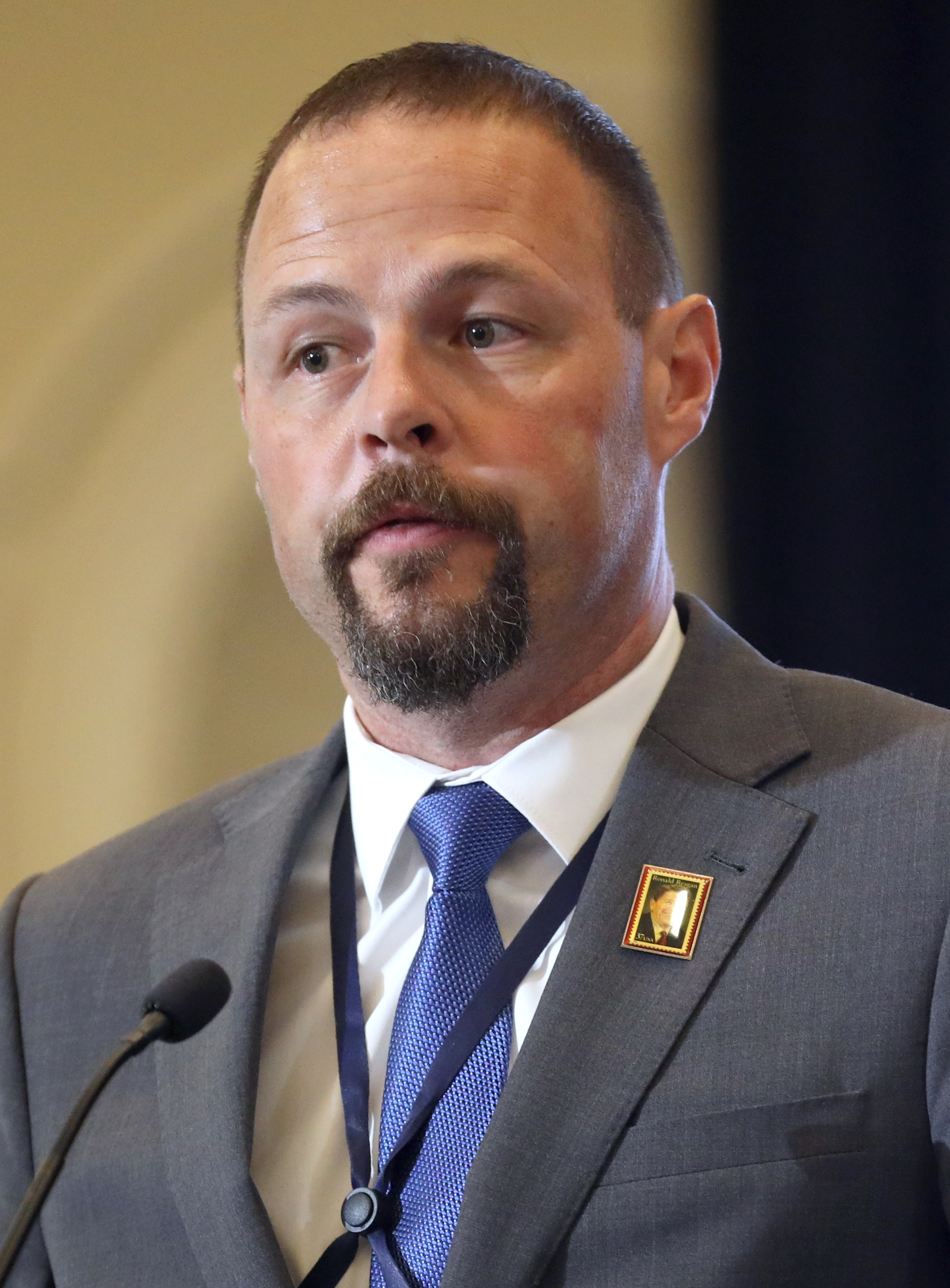

Member of the North Dakota House of Representatives from the 16th district
- Incumbent
- Assumed office December 1, 2012 Serving with Andrew Marschall
- Preceded by: Joyce Kingsbury

Personal details
- Born: January 2, 1980 (age 46) West Fargo, North Dakota, U.S.
- Party: Republican
- Spouse: Julie
- Children: 2
- Relatives: Kim Koppelman (father)
- Education: North Dakota State University (attended)

Ben Koppelman (born January 2, 1980) is an American politician and building contractor who has served in the North Dakota House of Representatives from the 16th district since 2012.

== Career ==
Koppelman graduated from West Fargo High School and attended North Dakota State University before moving on to business and contracting, later becoming president of Vision Construction LLC in 2003.

In 2008, Koppelman became a member of the West Fargo School Board and in 2011 moved up as President of the board. He would leave the board in 2012 to run for the North Dakota House of Representatives.

== North Dakota House of Representatives ==
Koppelman ran in 2012 for the state house as a Republican, unopposed in the primary. He would later win the election and became a member of the legislature alongside his father and Speaker of the House, Kim Koppelman. Koppelman would hold seat his subsequently in 2016, 2020, and 2024.

Koppelman served as a delegate for North Dakota in the 2016 United States Presidential election. According to an NPR article, Koppelman may have been the one to secure Trump’s nomination as the Republican candidate when he became an unbound delegate after Ted Cruz withdrew.

Koppelman’s tenure in the house has been defined with a mass of firearm related bills, all usually to cut regulation against guns and bills relating to transgender students in public schools. Along with that, Koppelman was also responsible for a bill to raise the speed limit in the state to 80 mph, which was vetoed by Governor Doug Burgum in 2023. Koppelman would submit an identical bill in 2025 session, which governor Kelly Armstrong would sign into law.

After being re-elected in 2024, Koppelman began a campaign to become the new house majority leader, hoping to replace the current leader Mike Lefor. Koppelman would lose his bid, and Lefor would remain the majority leader. Koppelman submitted and sponsored the most bills out of any representative during the 2025 session, a total of 21 that triples the average per representative.

== Political positions ==
Koppelman is a far-right conservative.

=== Abortion ===
Koppelman is pro-life and endorsed by the North Dakota chapter of the National Right to Life Committee.

=== Education ===
Koppelman voted to expand free school lunch in the state and lower the years requirement for teachers to obtain a lifetime teaching license. He also supported a controversial book ban policy and parents rights legislation, leading to criticism from the local education group North Dakota United.

Koppelman is a supporter of school choice and has attempted to create state sponsored educational savings accounts for private school students numerous times.

=== Elections ===
During the 2025 session, Koppelman submitted a new bill to ban ranked-choice voting and approval voting in the state, the latter being used in Fargo. The bill would be signed by governor Armstrong after a similar bill by Koppelman was vetoed by former governor Burgum in 2023.

Koppelman supported a bill that would require candidates to get a set number of signatures to get on the ballot, regardless of party endorsement, which automatically gets a candidate on the ballot under state law.

=== Guns ===
Koppelman is an avid supporter of the 2nd amendment and against gun-control. He has submitted bills over his tenure to allow firearm possession in religious institutions, ban red flag laws, allow constitutional carry on college campuses, and loosening stand your ground laws.

Koppelman has an A+ grade from the NRA Political Victory Fund, who endorsed him in 2020 and 2024.

=== LGBT Rights ===
Koppelman has, on numerous occasions, pushed for and submitted bills to restrict transgender students usage of bathrooms and sports participation that align with their gender identity.

== Personal life ==
Koppelman's father Kim Koppelman previously served in the North Dakota House of Representatives.

Koppelman is married to his wife, Julie, a paralegal. They have two children. Koppelman is a lutheran and attends Triumph Lutheran Brethren Church in West Fargo.
