= Kim Koppelman =

American politician

Speaker of the North Dakota House of Representatives
- In office December 14, 2020 – December 5, 2022
- Preceded by: Lawrence Klemin
- Succeeded by: Dennis Johnson

Member of the North Dakota House of Representatives from the 13th district
- In office 1994 – December 5, 2022
- Succeeded by: Jim Jonas

Personal details
- Born: October 16, 1956 (age 69) Breckenridge, Minnesota, U.S.
- Party: Republican
- Spouse: Torey
- Children: 3 (including Ben)
- Education: North Dakota State College of Science (BS)

Kim Koppelman is a former state legislator who served in North Dakota House of Representatives from 1994 to 2022 and a candidate for United States House of Representatives in 2012. He was also Speaker of the North Dakota House of Representatives for the last two years of his tenure. He was also the president and CEO of Koppelman & Associates, LLC, an advertising, marketing and public relations agency.

== Early life and education ==
Kim Koppelman was born on 16 October 1956 in Breckenridge, Minnesota. Koppelman received his BS from North Dakota State College of Science in 1976.

== Career ==
Koppelman held the position of director of advertising, marketing and public relations, C.R. Limited, from 1982 till 1984 when he would go on to serve as the president and CEO of his own advertising firm Koppelman and Associates from 1984 till it closed an unknown date.

Koppelman served as the national chair of the Council of State Governments in 2008.

== Political career ==
Koppelman served on the Riverside City Council from 1984 to 1988, as well as being both Emergency Management Coordinator from 1986-1988 and Representative for the Metropolitan Council of Governments from 1986-1988.

In 1994, Koppelman would run for and win a seat in the North Dakota House of Representatives. He would represent the 13th district, which covers most of northern West Fargo, North Dakota. He was subsequently re-elected till 2022, when he lost the endorsement of his district party, and subsequently retired. Koppelman was also elected Speaker of the North Dakota House of Representatives in 2020 and served till he retired.

On the subject of the mask-mandate and its removal, Koppelman said "It was the understanding, I think, of everyone involved that this was something we were going to do for a period of time. We didn’t know what the period of time was. We didn’t know when or if it would be suspended during the session. But I think most of us expected that we would change it or alter it."

Koppelman would run as a candidate in 2012 for the U.S. House after the announcement incumbent Rick Berg would retire to run for the senate. Koppelman would participate in a debate with fellow representative Bette Grande, senate staffer Shane Goettle, and public service commissioners Brian Kalk and Kevin Cramer He would withdraw from the race before the primaries.

== Personal life ==
Koppelman is married to his wife, Torey. They have 3 children including Ben Koppelman, who has served in the state house since 2012.

Political offices
Preceded by Lawrence Klemin	Speaker of the North Dakota House of Representatives; 2020–2022	Succeeded by Dennis Johnson
