= List of current United States presidents pro tempore =

The following is a list of senate presidents and senate presidents pro tempore (and their equivalent presiding officer roles) of the upper chambers of the federal, state and territorial legislatures in the United States.

== Senate Presidents ==
State	Name	Party	Start	Last Election	Next Election
United States	JD Vance (Note: Also serves as Vice President of the United States.)	Republican	January 20, 2025	2024	2028
Alabama	Will Ainsworth	Republican	January 14, 2019	2022	2026 (term limited)
Alaska	Gary Stevens	Republican/ Coalition	January 17, 2023	2022	2026 (retiring)
Arizona	Warren Petersen	Republican	January 9, 2023	2024	2026 (retiring)
Arkansas	Leslie Rutledge (Note: Also serves as Lieutenant Governor.)	Republican	January 10, 2023	2022	2026
California	Eleni Kounalakis	Democratic	January 7, 2019	2022	2026 (term limited)
Colorado	James Coleman	Democratic	January 8, 2025	2024	2028 (term limited)
Connecticut	Susan Bysiewicz	Democratic	January 9, 2019	2022	2026
Delaware	Kyle Gay	Democratic	January 21, 2025	2024	2028
Florida	Ben Albritton	Republican	November 19, 2024	2024	2028 (term limited)
Georgia	Burt Jones	Republican	January 9, 2023	2022	2026 (term limited)
Hawaii	Ron Kouchi	Democratic	May 5, 2015	2022	2026
Idaho	Scott Bedke	Republican	January 2, 2023	2022	2026
Illinois	Don Harmon	Democratic	January 19, 2020	2022	2026
Indiana	Micah Beckwith	Republican	January 13, 2025	2024	2028
Iowa	Amy Sinclair	Republican	January 9, 2023	2024	2028
Kansas	Ty Masterson	Republican	January 11, 2021	2024	2028
Kentucky	Bob Stivers	Republican	January 4, 2013	2024	2028
Louisiana	Cameron Henry	Republican	January 8, 2024	2023	2027
Maine	Mattie Daughtry	Democratic	December 4, 2024	2024	2026
Maryland	Bill Ferguson	Democratic	January 8, 2020	2022	2026
Massachusetts	Karen Spilka	Democratic	July 26, 2018	2024	2026
Michigan	Garlin Gilchrist	Democratic	January 1, 2019	2022	2026 (term limited)
Minnesota	Bobby Champion	Democratic	January 3, 2023	2022	2026
Mississippi	Del Hosemann	Republican	January 14, 2020	2023	2027
Missouri	David Wasinger	Republican	January 13, 2025	2024	2028
Montana	Matt Regier	Republican	January 6, 2025	2024	2028
Nebraska (Note: Nebraska legislators are formally nonpartisan.) (Note: Unicameral legislature.)	Joe Kelly	Republican	January 5, 2023	2022	2026
Nevada	Stavros Anthony	Republican	January 2, 2023	2022	2026
New Hampshire	Sharon Carson	Republican	December 4, 2024	2024	2026 (flipped)
New Jersey	Nick Scutari	Democratic	January 11, 2022	2023	2027
New Mexico	Howie Morales	Democratic	January 1, 2019	2022	2026 (term limited)
New York	Antonio Delgado	Democratic	May 25, 2022	2022	2026 (retiring)
North Carolina	Rachel Hunt	Democratic	January 1, 2025	2024	2028
North Dakota	Michelle Strinden	Republican	December 15, 2024	2024	2028
Ohio	Rob McColley	Republican	January 6, 2025	2022	2026 (retiring)
Oklahoma	Matt Pinnell	Republican	January 14, 2019	2022	2026 (term limited)
Oregon	Rob Wagner	Democratic	January 9, 2023	2022	2026
Pennsylvania	Austin Davis	Democratic	January 17, 2023	2022	2026 (flipped)
Rhode Island	Val Lawson	Democratic	April 29, 2025	2024	2026
South Carolina	Thomas Alexander	Republican	December 6, 2021	2024	2028
South Dakota	Tony Venhuizen (Note: Appointed.)	Republican	January 30, 2025	2022	2026
Tennessee	Randy McNally	Republican	January 10, 2017	2022	2026 (retiring)
Texas	Dan Patrick	Republican	January 20, 2015	2022	2026
Utah	Stuart Adams	Republican	January 28, 2019	2022	2026 (primaried)
Vermont	John Rodgers	Republican	January 9, 2025	2024	2026
Virginia	Ghazala Hashmi	Democratic	January 17, 2026	2025	2029
Washington	Denny Heck	Democratic	January 13, 2021	2024	2028
West Virginia	Randy Smith	Republican	January 8, 2025	2024	2028
Wisconsin	Mary Felzkowski	Republican	January 8, 2025	2024	2026 (flipped)
Wyoming	Bo Biteman	Republican	January 14, 2025	2022	2026 (retiring)
American Samoa	Tuaolo Fruean	Independent	January 8, 2021	2024	2028
District of Columbia	Phil Mendelson	Democratic	June 13, 2012	2022	2026
Guam	Frank Blas	Republican	January 6, 2025	2024	2026 (retiring)
Northern Mariana Islands	Karl King-Nabors	Republican	July 23, 2025	2024	2028
Puerto Rico	Thomas Rivera	New Progressive	January 2, 2025	2024	2028
Puerto Rico	Thomas Rivera	Republican	January 2, 2025	2024	2028
Virgin Islands	Milton Potter	Democratic	January 13, 2025	2024	2026 (retiring)

== Senate Presidents Pro Tempore ==
State	Name	Party	Start	Last Election	Next Election
United States	Chuck Grassley	Republican	January 3, 2025	2022	2028
Alabama	Garlan Gudger	Republican	February 5, 2025	2022	2026
Alaska	None				
Arizona	TJ Shope	Republican	January 9, 2023	2024	2026 (flipped)
Arkansas	Bart Hester	Republican	January 9, 2023	2024	2028 (term limited)
California	Monique Limón	Democratic	November 17, 2025	2024	2028 (term limited)
Colorado	Cathy Kipp	Democratic	February 23, 2026	2024	2028
Connecticut	Marty Looney	Democratic	January 13, 2021	2024	2026 (retiring)
Delaware	David Sokola	Democratic	November 4, 2020	2022	2026 (retiring)
Florida	Jason Brodeur	Republican	November 19, 2024	2022	2026
Georgia	Larry Walker	Republican	January 12, 2026	2024	2026
Hawaii (Note: As Senate Vice President.)	Lorraine Inouye	Democratic	September 1, 2026	2024	2028
Idaho	Kelly Anthon	Republican	December 5, 2024	2024	2026
Illinois	Bill Cunningham	Democratic	January 30, 2020	2022	2026 (retiring)
Indiana	Rod Bray	Republican	November 7, 2018	2024	2028
Iowa	Ken Rozenboom	Republican	January 8, 2025	2022	2026 (retiring)
Kansas	Tim Shallenburger	Democratic	January 10, 2025	2024	2028
Kentucky	David Givens	Republican	January 8, 2019	2024	2028
Louisiana	Regina Barrow	Democratic	January 8, 2024	2023	2027 (term limited)
Maine	None				
Maryland	Malcolm Augustine	Democratic	January 11, 2023	2022	2026
Massachusetts	Will Brownsberger	Democratic	March 20, 2019	2024	2026
Michigan	Jeremy Moss	Democratic	January 11, 2023	2022	2026 (retiring)
Minnesota	Ann Rest	Democratic	January 11, 2023	2022	2026 (retiring)
Mississippi	Dean Kirby	Republican	January 7, 2020	2023	2027
Missouri	Cindy O'Laughlin	Republican	January 8, 2025	2022	2026 (retiring)
Montana	Ken Bogner	Republican	January 2, 2023	2022	2026 (retiring)
Nebraska	John Arch	Republican	January 4, 2023	2022	2026 (term limited)
Nevada	Marilyn Dondero Loop	Democratic	February 3, 2025	2022	2026
New Hampshire	Daryl Abbas	Republican	December 4, 2024	2024	2026 (flipped)
New Jersey	Shirley Turner	Democratic	January 9, 2024	2023	2027
New Mexico	Mimi Stewart	Democratic	January 19, 2021	2024	2028
New York	Andrea Stewart-Cousins	Democratic	January 9, 2019	2024	2026
North Carolina	Phil Berger	Republican	January 26, 2011	2024	2026 (primaried)
North Dakota	Kyle Davison	Republican	April 10, 2025	2022	2026
Ohio	Bill Reineke	Republican	January 6, 2025	2024	2028 (term limited)
Oklahoma	Lonnie Paxton	Republican	January 7, 2025	2024	2028 (term limited)
Oregon	James Manning	Democratic	January 11, 2021	2022	2026
Pennsylvania	Kim Ward	Republican	November 30, 2022	2024	2026 (flipped)
Rhode Island	Hanna Gallo	Democratic	January 5, 2021	2024	2026
South Carolina	None				
South Dakota	Chris Karr	Republican	January 14, 2025	2024	2026
Tennessee	Ferrell Haile	Republican	January 19, 2018	2024	2028
Texas	Charles Perry	Republican	June 2, 2025	2022	2026
Utah	None				
Vermont	Phil Baruth	Democratic	January 4, 2023	2024	2026 (retiring)
Virginia	Louise Lucas	Democratic	January 8, 2020	2023	2027
Washington	Steve Conway	Democratic	January 13, 2025	2022	2026 (retiring)
West Virginia	Jay Taylor	Republican	January 14, 2026	2022	2026
Wisconsin	Patrick Testin	Republican	January 4, 2021	2024	2026 (flipped)
Wyoming	Tim Salazar	Republican	January 14, 2025	2024	2028
American Samoa	None				
District of Columbia	Anita Bonds	Democratic	January 20, 2026	2022	2026 (retiring)
Guam	Tony Ada	Republican	January 6, 2025	2024	2026
Northern Mariana Islands	Corina Magofna	Independent	July 31, 2025	2022	2026
Puerto Rico	Carmelo Ríos	New Progressive	January 2, 2025	2024	2028
Puerto Rico	Carmelo Ríos	Democratic	January 2, 2025	2024	2028
Virgin Islands	Kenny Gittens	Democratic	January 13, 2025	2024	2026

== See also ==
- List of state legislature speakers
