= List of state legislature speakers =

The following is a list of house speakers and house speakers pro tempore (and their equivalent presiding officer roles) of the lower chambers of the federal, state and territorial legislatures in the United States.

== House Speakers ==
State	Name	Party	Start	Last Election	Next Election
United States	Mike Johnson	Republican	October 25, 2023	2024	2026
Alabama	Nathan Ledbetter	Republican	January 10, 2023	2024	2026
Alaska	Bryce Edgmon	Independent/ Coalition	January 21, 2025	2024	2026 (retiring)
Arizona	Steve Montenegro	Republican	January 13, 2025	2024	2026 (flipped)
Arkansas	Brian Evans	Republican	January 13, 2025	2024	2026
California	Rob Rivas	Democratic	June 30, 2023	2024	2026
Colorado	Julie McCluskie	Democratic	January 9, 2023	2024	2026 (term limited)
Connecticut	Matt Ritter	Democratic	January 6, 2021	2024	2026
Delaware	Mimi Minor-Brown	Democratic	January 14, 2025	2024	2026
Florida	Wyman Duggan; Acting	Republican	August 21, 2026	2024	2026 (term limited)
Georgia	Jon Burns	Republican	January 9, 2023	2024	2026 (flipped)
Hawaii	Nadine Nakamura	Democratic	November 6, 2024	2024	2026
Idaho	Mike Moyle	Republican	December 1, 2022	2024	2026
Illinois	Chris Welch	Democratic	January 13, 2021	2024	2026 (retiring)
Indiana	Todd Huston	Republican	March 9, 2020	2024	2026 (defeated)
Iowa	Pat Grassley	Republican	January 13, 2020	2024	2026
Kansas	Dan Hawkins	Republican	January 9, 2023	2024	2026 (retiring)
Kentucky	David Osborne	Republican	November 5, 2017	2024	2026
Louisiana	Phillip DeVillier	Republican	January 8, 2024	2023	2027
Maine	Ryan Fecteau	Democratic	December 4, 2024	2024	2026
Maryland	Joseline Peña-Melnyk	Democratic	December 16, 2025	2024	2026
Massachusetts	Ron Mariano	Democratic	December 30, 2020	2024	2026
Michigan	Matt Hall	Republican	January 8, 2025	2024	2026 (flipped)
Minnesota	Lisa Demuth	Republican	February 6, 2025	2024	2026 (retiring)
Mississippi	Jason White	Republican	January 2, 2024	2023	2027
Missouri	Jon Patterson	Republican	January 8, 2025	2024	2026 (term limited)
Montana	Brandon Ler	Republican	January 6, 2025	2024	2026
Nebraska (Note: Nebraska legislators are formally nonpartisan.) (Note: Unicameral legislature.)	Joe Kelly*	Republican	January 5, 2023	2024	2026
Nevada	Steve Yeager	Democratic	April 28, 2022	2024	2026 (retiring)
New Hampshire	Sherm Packard	Republican	December 9, 2020	2024	2026 (flipped)
New Jersey	Craig Coughlin	Democratic	January 9, 2018	2025	2027
New Mexico	Javier Martínez	Democratic	January 17, 2023	2024	2026
New York	Carl Heastie	Democratic	February 3, 2015	2024	2026
North Carolina	Destin Hall	Republican	January 8, 2025	2024	2026 (flipped)
North Dakota	Robin Weisz	Republican	January 7, 2025	2024	2026 (retiring)
Ohio	Matt Huffman	Republican	January 6, 2025	2024	2026
Oklahoma	Kyle Hilbert	Republican	January 7, 2025	2024	2026
Oregon	Julie Fahey	Democratic	March 7, 2024	2024	2026
Pennsylvania	Joanna McClinton	Democratic	February 28, 2023	2024	2026
Rhode Island	Chris Blazejewski	Democratic	May 7, 2026	2024	2026
South Carolina	Murrell Smith	Republican	May 12, 2022	2024	2026
South Dakota	Jon Hansen	Republican	January 14, 2025	2024	2026 (term limited)
Tennessee	Cameron Sexton	Republican	August 23, 2019	2024	2026
Texas	Dustin Burrows	Republican	January 14, 2025	2024	2026 (flipped)
Utah	Mike Schultz	Republican	November 15, 2023	2024	2026
Vermont	Jill Krowinski	Democratic	January 6, 2021	2024	2026 (retiring)
Virginia	Don Scott	Democratic	January 10, 2024	2025	2027
Washington	Laurie Jinkins	Democratic	January 13, 2020	2024	2026
West Virginia	Roger Hanshaw	Republican	August 29, 2018	2024	2026
Wisconsin	Robin Vos	Republican	January 7, 2013	2024	2026 (retiring)
Wyoming	Chip Neiman	Republican	January 14, 2025	2024	2026 (retiring)
American Samoa	Savali Ale	Republican	January 4, 2007	2024	2026
District of Columbia	Phil Mendelson	Democratic	June 13, 2012	2022	2026
Guam	Frank Blas	Democratic	January 6, 2025	2024	2026 (retiring)
Northern Mariana Islands	Ed Villagomez	Independent	January 13, 2021	2024	2026 (retiring)
Puerto Rico	Johnny Méndez	New Progressive	January 2, 2025	2024	2028
Puerto Rico	Johnny Méndez	Republican	January 2, 2025	2024	2028
Virgin Islands	Milton Potter	Democratic	January 13, 2025	2024	2026 (retiring)

== House Speakers Pro Tempore ==
State	Name	Party	Start	Last Election	Next Election
United States	None				
Alabama	Chris Pringle	Republican	January 10, 2023	2024	2026
Alaska	None				
Arizona	Neal Carter	Republican	January 13, 2025	2024	2026 (flipped)
Arkansas	Vacant		September 30, 2025	2024	2026
California	Josh Lowenthal	Democratic	December 2, 2024	2024	2026
Colorado	Andrew Boesenecker	Democratic	January 8, 2025	2024	2026
Connecticut	Bob Godfrey	Democratic	January 3, 2017	2024	2026
Delaware	None				
Florida	Wyman Duggan	Republican	November 19, 2024	2024	2026 (term limited)
Georgia	Jan Jones	Republican	January 11, 2010	2024	2026 (retiring)
Hawaii (Note: As House Vice Speaker.)	Linda Ichiyama	Democratic	November 6, 2024	2024	2026
Idaho	None				
Illinois	Kam Buckner	Democratic	January 10, 2025	2024	2026
Indiana	Michael Karickhoff	Republican	January 3, 2019	2024	2026 (retiring)
Iowa	John Wills	Republican	January 13, 2020	2024	2026
Kansas	Blake Carpenter	Republican	January 9, 2023	2024	2026
Kentucky	David Meade	Republican	January 8, 2019	2024	2026
Louisiana	Mike Johnson	Republican	January 8, 2024	2023	2027 (term limited)
Maine	None				
Maryland	Luke Clippinger	Democratic	January 14, 2026	2024	2026
Massachusetts	Kate Hogan	Democratic	February 11, 2021	2024	2026
Michigan	Rachelle Smit	Republican	January 8, 2025	2024	2026 (flipped)
Minnesota	Bjorn Olson	Republican	February 6, 2025	2024	2026
Mississippi	Manly Barton	Republican	January 2, 2024	2023	2027
Missouri	Chad Perkins	Republican	January 8, 2025	2024	2026
Montana	Katie Zolnikov	Republican	January 6, 2025	2024	2026
Nebraska	John Arch	Republican	January 4, 2023	2022	2026 (term limited)
Nevada	Daniele Monroe-Moreno	Democratic	February 6, 2023	2024	2026 (retiring)
New Hampshire	Jim Kofalt	Republican	March 10, 2025	2024	2026 (flipped)
New Jersey	Annette Quijano	Democratic	January 30, 2025	2025	2027
New Mexico	None				
New York	Pam Hunter	Democratic	January 9, 2025	2024	2026
North Carolina	Mitchell Setzer	Republican	January 8, 2025	2024	2026 (flipped)
North Dakota	None				
Ohio	Gayle Manning	Republican	January 6, 2025	2024	2026 (term limited)
Oklahoma	Anthony Moore	Republican	January 7, 2025	2024	2026
Oregon	David Gomberg	Democratic	January 13, 2025	2024	2026
Pennsylvania	None				
Rhode Island	Brian Kennedy	Democratic	January 12, 2017	2024	2026
South Carolina	Tommy Pope	Republican	December 2, 2014	2024	2026
South Dakota	Karla Lems	Republican	January 14, 2025	2024	2026 (retiring)
Tennessee	Pat Marsh	Republican	January 21, 2021	2024	2026
Texas	Joe Moody	Democratic	February 13, 2025	2024	2026
Utah	James Dunnigan	Republican	January 17, 2023	2024	2026
Vermont	None				
Virginia	None				
Washington	Chris Stearns	Democratic	January 13, 2025	2024	2026
West Virginia	Matt Rohrbach	Republican	January 8, 2025	2024	2026
Wisconsin	Kevin Petersen	Republican	January 3, 2023	2024	2026 (retiring)
Wyoming	Jeremy Haroldson	Republican	January 14, 2025	2024	2026
American Samoa	None				
District of Columbia	Anita Bonds	Democratic	January 20, 2026	2022	2026 (retiring)
Guam	Tony Ada	Republican	January 6, 2025	2024	2026
Northern Mariana Islands	Diego Camacho	Democratic	January 13, 2025	2024	2026
Puerto Rico	Angel Peña	New Progressive	January 2, 2025	2024	2028
Puerto Rico	Angel Peña	Democratic	January 2, 2025	2024	2028
Virgin Islands	Kenny Gittens	Democratic	January 13, 2025	2024	2026

== Records ==
Mike Madigan is cumulatively the longest-serving state legislative speaker in U.S. history (serving from 1983 to 1995 and again from 1997 to 2021). Tom Murphy served the longest consecutive tenure as state house speaker from 1973 to 2002. Tina Kotek is the longest-serving female state house speaker in U.S. history (serving from 2013 to 2022).

== See also ==
- List of current United States presidents pro tempore
