= Jim Jonas =

American politician

Member of the North Dakota House of Representatives from the 13th district
- Incumbent
- Assumed office December 1, 2022 Serving with Austen Schauer
- Preceded by: Kim Koppelman

Personal details
- Party: Republican

Jim Jonas is an American politician. He is serving as a member of the North Dakota House of Representatives from the 13th district, alongside Austen Schauer. He is a member of the Republican Party.

Jonas previously served as president of the West Fargo, North Dakota school board.
