= Michelle Strinden =

American politician (born 1968/69)

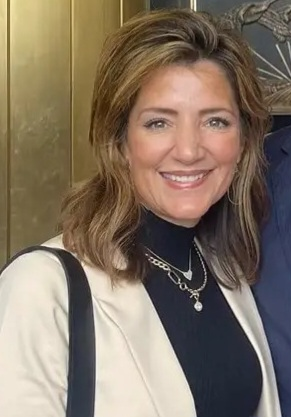

40th Lieutenant Governor of North Dakota
- Incumbent
- Assumed office December 15, 2024
- Governor: Kelly Armstrong
- Preceded by: Tammy Miller

Member of the North Dakota House of Representatives from the 41st district
- In office December 1, 2018 – December 1, 2024
- Preceded by: Al Carlson
- Succeeded by: Karen Grindberg

Personal details
- Born: Michelle Strecker; 1968 or 1969 (age 56–57) Grand Forks, North Dakota, U.S.
- Party: Republican
- Spouse: Tom Strinden (m. 1996; died 2025)
- Children: 4
- Relatives: Karen Grindberg (sister-in-law); Earl Strinden (father-in-law)
- Education: University of North Dakota (BA); Minnesota State University Moorhead (MS)

Michelle Strinden (née Strecker; born 1968/69) is an American politician who has served as the 40th lieutenant governor of North Dakota since 2024, having been elected in 2024, on a ticket with U.S. Representative Kelly Armstrong, the candidate for governor. She served as a member of the North Dakota House of Representatives from the 41st district. Elected in November 2018, she assumed office on December 1, 2018 serving until 2024.

== Early life and education ==
Strinden was born in Grand Forks, North Dakota to George and Betty Lou (Hafner) Strecker. She graduated from Bismarck Century High School in 1987. She earned a Bachelor of Science degree in secondary education from the University of North Dakota in 1991 and a Master of Science in counseling from Minnesota State University Moorhead in 1995. During her studies at the University of North Dakota, she worked on her future father-in-law Earl Strinden's campaign for the U.S. Senate election in 1988.

== Career ==
Strinden worked as a school counselor in the West Fargo Public Schools. She was elected to the North Dakota House of Representatives in November 2018 and assumed office on December 1, 2018. Strinden is an advocate for school choice.

In the 2024 North Dakota gubernatorial election, U.S. Representative Kelly Armstrong chose Strinden as his running mate, both winning the endorsement of the state Republican Party. They won the Republican primary on June 11, defeating lieutenant governor Tammy Miller and commerce commissioner Josh Teigen.

During her tenure as Lt. Governor, she and Armstrong stated that one of their goals was to make North Dakota the most military friendly state in the country, working alongside state agencies to accomplish this goal. Additionally, Strinden stated that in her role, she would prioritize family time for herself and her staff.

North Dakota House of Representatives
| Preceded by Al Carlson | Member of the North Dakota House of Representatives from the 41st district 2018–2024; Served alongside: Pamela Anderson, Jorin Johnson | Succeeded by Karen Grindberg |
Party political offices
| Preceded by Brent Sanford | Republican nominee for Lieutenant Governor of North Dakota; 2024 | Most recent |
Political offices
| Preceded by Tammy Miller | Lieutenant Governor of North Dakota; 2024–present | Incumbent |
