= Francis J. Wald =

American politician (1935–2011)

Member of the North Dakota House of Representatives from the 37th district
- In office December 1, 1984 – December 1, 2010
- Succeeded by: Vicky Steiner
- In office December 1, 1978 – December 1, 1982

56th Speaker of the North Dakota House of Representatives
- In office December 1, 1998 – December 1, 2000
- Preceded by: Mike Timm
- Succeeded by: LeRoy G. Bernstein

Personal details
- Born: April 8, 1935 Logan County, North Dakota
- Died: May 3, 2011 (aged 76) Dickinson, North Dakota
- Party: Republican

Francis J. Wald (April 8, 1935 – May 3, 2011) was an American politician who served in the North Dakota House of Representatives from the 37th district from 1978 to 1982 and from 1984 to 2010. He served as Speaker of the North Dakota House of Representatives from 1998 to 2000.

He died of lung cancer on May 3, 2011, in Dickinson, North Dakota at age 76.
