= Richard W. Kloubec =

American politician (1931–2023)

Member of the North Dakota House of Representatives
- In office 1973–1974
- In office 1977–1992

Speaker of the North Dakota House of Representatives
- In office 1987–1988
- Preceded by: LeRoy Hausauer
- Succeeded by: William Kretschmar

Personal details
- Born: February 2, 1931 Fargo, North Dakota, U.S.
- Died: June 7, 2023 (aged 92)
- Party: Republican
- Education: North Dakota State University

Richard William Kloubec (February 2, 1931 – June 7, 2023) was an American politician. He served as a Republican member of the North Dakota House of Representatives.

== Life and career ==
Kloubec was born in Fargo, North Dakota to William and Vera Kloubec. He attended North Dakota State University. He served in the Korean War from 1952 to 1954.

Kloubec served in the North Dakota House of Representatives from 1973 to 1974 and again from 1977 to 1992. He was speaker of the house from 1987 until 1988 and was the majority leader from 1989 until 1992.

Kloubec died on June 7, 2023, at the age of 92.
