= Clarence Martin (disambiguation) =

Clarence D. Martin (1886–1955) was an American politician who served as the 11th governor of Washington. Clarence Martin may also refer to:

- Clarence A. Martin (1896–1986), major general in the United States Army
- Clarence R. Martin (1886–1972), justice of the Indiana Supreme Court
- Clarrie Martin (born Clarence Edward Martin; 1900–1953), Australian politician and a member of the New South Wales Legislative Assembly
- Clare Martin (ice hockey) (born George Clarence Martin; 1922–1980), Canadian ice hockey defenceman
- Clarence Martin (North Dakota politician) (1929–1997), speaker of the North Dakota House of Representatives
