= Bette Grande =

American politician (born 1961)

Member of the North Dakota House of Representatives from the 41st district
- In office 1996–2014
- Preceded by: Dan Austin
- Succeeded by: Pamela Anderson

Personal details
- Born: January 25, 1961 (age 65) Williston, North Dakota, U.S.
- Party: North Dakota Republican Party
- Spouse: Don Grande
- Education: University of North Dakota (BS)
- Profession: Office manager, Substitute teacher, Politician

Bette B. Grande (born January 25, 1961) is a North Dakota Republican Party politician who represented the 41st district alongside Al Carlson in the North Dakota House of Representatives from 1997 to 2014.

Grande is a member of the American Legislative Exchange Council (ALEC), serving as North Dakota state leader, also with Carlson.

== Early life, education, and early career ==
Grande has a B.S. in education and a minor in sports medicine from the University of North Dakota. She has been the Director of Christian Education, a substitute teacher, and an office manager.

== North Dakota House of Representatives ==
=== Elections ===
She was elected in 1996 and was re-elected in 2000, 2002, 2006, and 2010.

=== Committee assignments ===
Grande is a member of the House Appropriations committee, and serves on the Education and Environment subsection.

== 2012 legislative election ==
In October 2011, she announced she would run for the seat being vacated by U.S. Congressman Rick Berg, who ran for the U.S. Senate.

== 2014 legislative election ==
Grande ran for reelection in 2014, but lost her bid to retired banker Pamela Anderson.

== Personal life ==
Grande lives in Fargo, North Dakota with her husband Don and her three children. She is a member of the Calvary United Methodist Church.
