= Janet Wentz =

American politician (1937–2003)

Member of the North Dakota House of Representatives from the 3rd district
- In office 1975–2003

Speaker of the North Dakota House of Representatives
- In office January 7, 2003 – September 15, 2003
- Preceded by: LeRoy G. Bernstein
- Succeeded by: Matthew Klein

Personal details
- Born: July 21, 1937 McClusky, North Dakota
- Died: September 15, 2003 (aged 66) Minot, North Dakota
- Party: Republican
- Spouse: Thomas A. Wentz
- Education: Minot State University

Janet Wentz (née Neff, July 21, 1937 – September 15, 2003) was the speaker of the North Dakota House of Representatives from January 7, 2003, until her death. She was elected in December 2002 to serve from January 2003 and was the second woman to become speaker of the North Dakota legislature. Representative Matthew Klein succeeded her as speaker.

== Early life ==
She was born Janet Marie Neff on July 21, 1937, to her parents, Charles and Martha Neff, in McCulsky, North Dakota. She attended McClusky High School and graduated in 1955. Wentz went on to study at Westmar College, in Le Mars, Iowa, the University of Minnesota, in Minneapolis, and Minot State University in North Dakota. She married Thomas Wentz in 1957.

== Career ==
Wentz first won election to the North Dakota House of Representatives in 1974. In her time at the legislature, she served as Chair of the House Judiciary Committee.

In December 2002, she became Speaker of the North Dakota House of Representatives. She remained speaker until she died in office, on September 15, 2003.

== See also ==
- List of female speakers of legislatures in the United States

| Preceded by LeRoy G. Bernstein | Speaker of the North Dakota House of Representatives; 2003 | Succeeded by Matthew Klein |
