= Litchville, North Dakota =

City in North Dakota, United States

- City
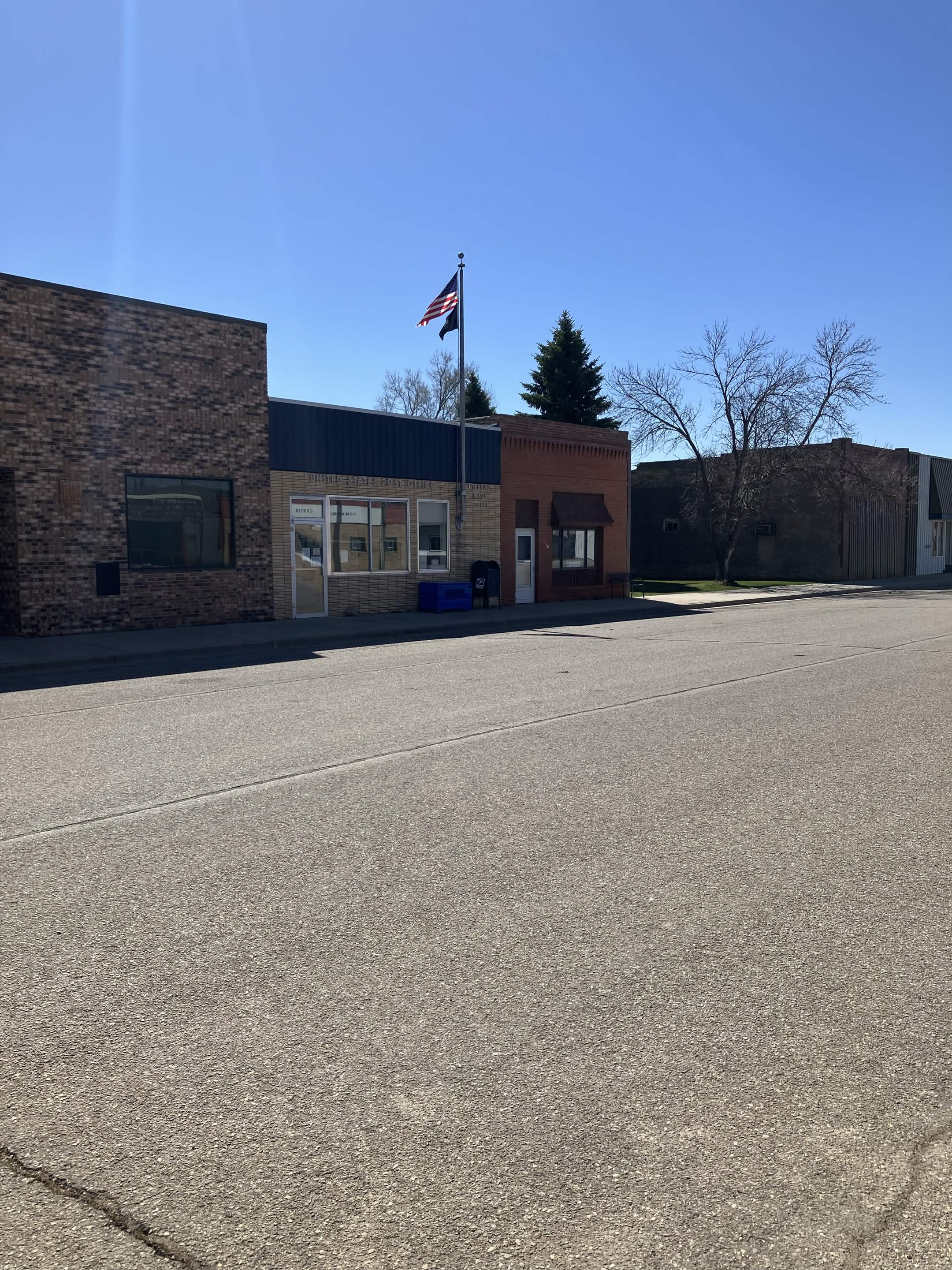
- Post office in Litchville, North Dakota

- Location of Litchville, North Dakota
- Coordinates: 46°39′13″N 98°11′26″W
- Country: United States
- State: North Dakota
- County: Barnes
- Founded: 1900

Area
  - Total: 2.26 sq mi (5.85 km^{2})
  - Land: 2.26 sq mi (5.85 km^{2})
  - Water: 0 sq mi (0.00 km^{2})
- Elevation: 1,470 ft (448 m)

Population (2020)
  - Total: 169
  - Estimate (2022): 165
  - Density: 74.8/sq mi (28.89/km^{2})
- Time zone: UTC-6 (Central (CST))
  - Summer (DST): UTC-5 (CDT)
- ZIP code: 58461
- Area code: 701
- FIPS code: 38-47140
- GNIS feature ID: 1029921

Litchville is a city in Barnes County, North Dakota, United States. The population was 169 at the 2020 census. Litchville was founded in 1900.

== Geography ==
Litchville is located at 46°39′13″N 98°11′26″W (46.653683, -98.190604).

According to the United States Census Bureau, the city has a total area of 1.48 square miles (3.83 km^{2}), all land.

== Demographics ==
Historical population
Census	Pop.	Note	%±
1910	484		—
1920	528		9.1%
1930	410		−22.3%
1940	430		4.9%
1950	408		−5.1%
1960	345		−15.4%
1970	294		−14.8%
1980	251		−14.6%
1990	205		−18.3%
2000	191		−6.8%
2010	172		−9.9%
2020	169		−1.7%
2022 (est.)	165		−2.4%
U.S. Decennial Census; 2020 Census

=== 2010 census ===
As of the census of 2010, there were 172 people, 78 households, and 53 families living in the city. The population density was 116.2 inhabitants per square mile (44.9/km^{2}). There were 98 housing units at an average density of 66.2 per square mile (25.6/km^{2}). The racial makeup of the city was 94.8% White, 0.6% African American, 0.6% Native American, 0.6% from other races, and 3.5% from two or more races. Hispanic or Latino of any race were 0.6% of the population.

There were 78 households, of which 23.1% had children under the age of 18 living with them, 62.8% were married couples living together, 1.3% had a female householder with no husband present, 3.8% had a male householder with no wife present, and 32.1% were non-families. 30.8% of all households were made up of individuals, and 14.1% had someone living alone who was 65 years of age or older. The average household size was 2.21 and the average family size was 2.72.

The median age in the city was 49.2 years. 17.4% of residents were under the age of 18; 6.4% were between the ages of 18 and 24; 16.9% were from 25 to 44; 34.9% were from 45 to 64; and 24.4% were 65 years of age or older. The gender makeup of the city was 51.2% male and 48.8% female.

=== 2000 census ===
As of the census of 2000, there were 191 people, 88 households, and 55 families living in the city. The population density was 129.2 inhabitants per square mile (49.9/km^{2}). There were 110 housing units at an average density of 74.4 per square mile (28.7/km^{2}). The racial makeup of the city was 97.91% White, 0.52% Native American, 0.52% Asian, and 1.05% from two or more races.

There were 88 households, out of which 25.0% had children under the age of 18 living with them, 55.7% were married couples living together, 4.5% had a female householder with no husband present, and 37.5% were non-families. 36.4% of all households were made up of individuals, and 21.6% had someone living alone who was 65 years of age or older. The average household size was 2.17 and the average family size was 2.85.

In the city, the population was spread out, with 23.6% under the age of 18, 5.2% from 18 to 24, 27.2% from 25 to 44, 16.2% from 45 to 64, and 27.7% who were 65 years of age or older. The median age was 41 years. For every 100 females, there were 91.0 males. For every 100 females age 18 and over, there were 102.8 males.

The median income for a household in the city was $23,393, and the median income for a family was $30,625. Males had a median income of $25,625 versus $16,250 for females. The per capita income for the city was $13,657. About 3.8% of families and 5.6% of the population were below the poverty line, including none of those under the age of eighteen or sixty five or over.

== Education ==
It is in the Litchville-Marion School District. The district was formed in 2002.

== Notable people ==
- Fred G. Aandahl, 23rd governor of North Dakota
- Earl Strinden, North Dakota state legislator
- Theron Strinden, North Dakota state legislator
- Frank White, 8th Governor of North Dakota
- Ralph M. Winge, North Dakota Politician, State Legislator

== Climate ==
This climatic region is typified by large seasonal temperature differences, with warm to hot (and often humid) summers and cold (sometimes severely cold) winters. According to the Köppen Climate Classification system, Litchville has a humid continental climate, abbreviated "Dfb" on climate maps.
