= Venturia, North Dakota =

- City
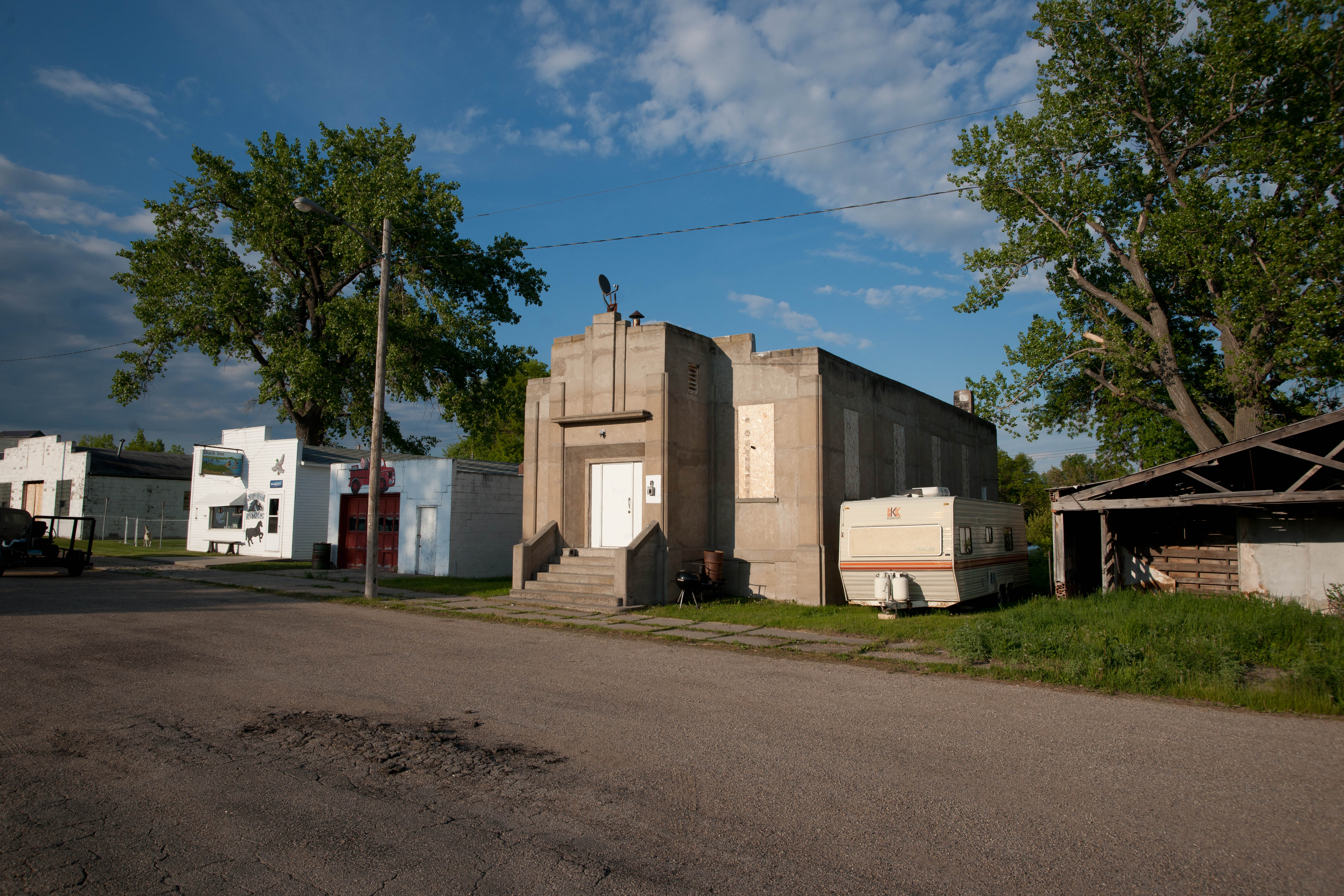
- Buildings in Venturia

- Location of Venturia, North Dakota
- Coordinates: 45°59′50″N 99°33′03″W
- Country: United States
- State: North Dakota
- County: McIntosh
- Founded: 1901

Area
  - Total: 0.11 sq mi (0.29 km^{2})
  - Land: 0.11 sq mi (0.29 km^{2})
  - Water: 0 sq mi (0.00 km^{2})
- Elevation: 2,080 ft (630 m)

Population (2020)
  - Total: 21
  - Estimate (2022): 20
  - Density: 189/sq mi (72.8/km^{2})
- Time zone: UTC-6 (Central (CST))
  - Summer (DST): UTC-5 (CDT)
- ZIP code: 58413
- Area code: 701
- FIPS code: 38-81700
- GNIS feature ID: 1036308

Venturia is a city in McIntosh County, North Dakota, United States. The population was 21 at the 2020 census. Venturia was founded in 1901.

== Geography ==
According to the United States Census Bureau, the city has a total area of 0.06 square miles (0.16 km^{2}), all land.

== Demographics ==
Historical population
Census	Pop.	Note	%±
1920	207		—
1930	233		12.6%
1940	257		10.3%
1950	190		−26.1%
1960	148		−22.1%
1970	77		−48.0%
1980	40		−48.1%
1990	30		−25.0%
2000	23		−23.3%
2010	10		−56.5%
2020	21		110.0%
2022 (est.)	20		−4.8%
U.S. Decennial Census; 2020 Census

=== 2010 census ===
As of the census of 2010, there were 10 people, 7 households, and 3 families residing in the city. The population density was 166.7 inhabitants per square mile (64.4/km^{2}). There were 12 housing units at an average density of 200.0 per square mile (77.2/km^{2}). The racial makeup of the city was 100.0% White.

There were 7 households, of which 28.6% were married couples living together, 14.3% had a female householder with no husband present, and 57.1% were non-families. 57.1% of all households were made up of individuals, and 28.6% had someone living alone who was 65 years of age or older. The average household size was 1.43 and the average family size was 2.00.

The median age in the city was 59.5 years. 0.0% of residents were under the age of 18; 0.0% were between the ages of 18 and 24; 20% were from 25 to 44; 40% were from 45 to 64; and 40% were 65 years of age or older. The gender makeup of the city was 50.0% male and 50.0% female.

=== 2000 census ===
As of the census of 2000, there were 23 people, 10 households, and 8 families residing in the city. The population density was 343.0 inhabitants per square mile (132.4/km^{2}). There were 14 housing units at an average density of 208.8 per square mile (80.6/km^{2}). The racial makeup of the city was 100.00% White.

There were 10 households, out of which 20.0% had children under the age of 18 living with them, 70.0% were married couples living together, 10.0% had a female householder with no husband present, and 20.0% were non-families. 20.0% of all households were made up of individuals, and 10.0% had someone living alone who was 65 years of age or older. The average household size was 2.30 and the average family size was 2.63.

In the city, the population was spread out, with 17.4% under the age of 18, 4.3% from 18 to 24, 21.7% from 25 to 44, 30.4% from 45 to 64, and 26.1% who were 65 years of age or older. The median age was 48 years. For every 100 females, there were 91.7 males. For every 100 females age 18 and over, there were 90.0 males.

The median income for a household in the city was $28,125, and the median income for a family was $26,875. Males had a median income of $23,750 versus $0 for females. The per capita income for the city was $16,861. None of the population and none of the families were below the poverty line.

== Climate ==
This climatic region is typified by large seasonal temperature differences, with warm to hot (and often humid) summers and cold (sometimes severely cold) winters. According to the Köppen Climate Classification system, Venturia has a humid continental climate, abbreviated "Dfb" on climate maps.

== Notable person ==
- William Kretschmar (1933-2017), lawyer and North Dakota state legislator, lived in Venturia.
