= Jeff Delzer =

American politician (born 1959)

Speaker of the North Dakota House of Representatives
- In office 2007–2009
- Preceded by: Matthew Klein
- Succeeded by: David Drovdal

Member of the North Dakota House of Representatives from the 8th district
- In office December 1, 1995 – December 1, 2022
- Succeeded by: Brandon Prichard

Personal details
- Party: Republican
- Profession: Farmer

Jeffrey W. Delzer is an American politician in the state of North Dakota. He is a member of the North Dakota House of Representatives, representing the 8th district. A Republican, he was first elected in 1992. He is an alumnus of Dawson Community College and a farmer. He was Speaker of the North Dakota House of Representatives from 2007 to 2009.
