= Mike Timm =

American politician (1937–2018)

Member of the North Dakota House of Representatives from the 5th district
- In office December 1, 1988 – December 1, 2006
- Succeeded by: Louis Pinkerton
- In office December 1, 1972 – December 1, 1986

55th Speaker of the North Dakota House of Representatives
- In office December 1, 1996 – December 1, 1998
- Preceded by: Clarence F. Martin
- Succeeded by: Francis J. Wald

Personal details
- Born: May 20, 1937 Minot, North Dakota
- Died: August 17, 2018 (aged 81) Minot, North Dakota
- Party: Republican

Mike Timm (May 20, 1937 – August 17, 2018) was an American politician who served in the North Dakota House of Representatives from the 5th district from 1972 to 1986 and from 1988 to 2006. He served as Speaker of the North Dakota House of Representatives from 1996 to 1998.

He died on August 17, 2018, in Minot, North Dakota at age 81.
