= Matthew Klein =

American politician (1933–2023)

Member of the North Dakota House of Representatives from the 40th district
- In office 1993–2016
- Succeeded by: Randy Schobinger

Speaker of the North Dakota House of Representatives
- In office 2005–2007
- Preceded by: Janet Wentz
- Succeeded by: Jeff Delzer

Personal details
- Born: December 28, 1933 Zeeland, North Dakota, U.S.
- Died: January 30, 2023 (aged 89) Minot, North Dakota, U.S.
- Party: Republican
- Spouse: Isabell

Military service
- Branch/service: United States Air Force

Matthew M. Klein (December 28, 1933 – January 30, 2023) was an American politician who served as member of the North Dakota House of Representatives from 1993 to 2016. He was also the speaker of the House during the 2005 legislative session. He was succeeded as speaker by Rep. Jeff Delzer. Klein was an engineering consultant by trade.

Klein graduated from North Dakota State University with a degree in Electrical Engineering and did graduate studies at USC and UCLA. He served in the United States Air Force and was a member of the American Legion. Klein died in Minot, North Dakota on January 30, 2023, at the age of 89.

Preceded by Janet Wentz	Speaker of the North Dakota House of Representatives; 2005	Succeeded by Jeff Delzer
