= Joyce Kingsbury =

American politician

Member of the North Dakota House of Representatives from the 16th district
- In office December 1, 2000 – December 1, 2012
- Preceded by: William E. Gorder
- Succeeded by: Ben Koppelman

Personal details
- Born: December 13, 1941 (age 84) Larimore, North Dakota
- Party: Republican

Joyce Kingsbury (born December 13, 1941) is an American politician who served in the North Dakota House of Representatives from the 16th district from 2000 to 2012.
