= Jon Lee (politician) =

American politician

Member-elect of the North Dakota House of Representatives from the 47th district
- Assuming office December 2026
- Succeeding: Lawrence Klemin

Personal details
- Party: Republican

Jon Lee is an American politician. A member of the Republican Party, he is the member-elect for the 47th district of the North Dakota House of Representatives.
