= List of female speakers of legislatures in the United States =

This is a list of women who have served as speakers and leaders of federal, state, and territorial legislatures in the United States.

== Congress ==
Denotes incumbent speaker

Name	Image	Country	Legislative Body	Party	Mandate start	Mandate end	Term length
Nancy Pelosi		United States	House of Representatives	Democratic	January 4, 2007	January 3, 2011	3 years, 364 days
Nancy Pelosi		United States	House of Representatives	Democratic	January 3, 2019	January 3, 2023	4 years, 0 days

== State ==
Denotes incumbent speaker

Name	Image	State	Legislative Body	Party	Mandate start	Mandate end	Term length
Minnie D. Craig		North Dakota	House of Representatives	Republican/NPL	January 3, 1933	January 8, 1935	2 years, 5 days
Consuelo N. Bailey		Vermont	House of Representatives	Republican	January 8, 1953	January 6, 1955	1 year, 363 days
Marion West Higgins		New Jersey	General Assembly	Republican	January 12, 1965	January 11, 1966	364 days
Edness Kimball Wilkins		Wyoming	House of Representatives	Democratic	May 30, 1966	January 9, 1967	224 days
Verda James		Wyoming	House of Representatives	Republican	January 14, 1969	January 12, 1971	1 year, 363 days
Vera Katz		Oregon	House of Representatives	Democratic	January 14, 1985	November 10, 1990	5 years, 300 days
Debra R. Anderson		South Dakota	House of Representatives	Republican	January 13, 1987	January 12, 1988	364 days
Jane Dee Hull		Arizona	House of Representatives	Republican	January 2, 1989	July, 1992	3 years, 181 days
Dee Long		Minnesota	House of Representatives	Democratic–Farmer–Labor	January 6, 1992	September 15, 1993	1 year, 252 days
Ramona Barnes		Alaska	House of Representatives	Republican	January 11, 1993	January 16, 1995	2 years, 5 days
Gail Phillips		Alaska	House of Representatives	Republican	January 16, 1995	January 19, 1999	4 years, 3 days
Jo Ann Davidson		Ohio	House of Representatives	Republican	January 3, 1995	December 31, 2000	5 years, 363 days
Bev Clarno		Oregon	House of Representatives	Republican	January 9, 1995	January 13, 1997	2 years, 4 days
Doris Allen (Note: First woman elected Speaker across party lines; she took a position with the support of Democrats, acting as a proxy to tip control away from the Republicans who held a one seat majority)		California	State Assembly	Republican	June 5, 1995	September 14, 1995	70 days
Libby Mitchell		Maine	House of Representatives	Democratic	December 4, 1996	December 2, 1998	1 year, 363 days
Donna Sytek		New Hampshire	House of Representatives	Republican	December 4, 1996	December 6, 2000	4 years, 2 days
Moira K. Lyons		Connecticut	House of Representatives	Democratic	January 6, 1999	January 5, 2005	5 years, 365 days
Lynn Snodgrass		Oregon	House of Representatives	Republican	January 11, 1999	January 8, 2001	1 year, 363 days
Janet Wentz		North Dakota	House of Representatives	Republican	January 7, 2003	September 15, 2003	251 days
Catherine Hanaway		Missouri	House of Representatives	Republican	January 8, 2003	January 5, 2005	1 year, 363 days
Lola Spradley		Colorado	House of Representatives	Republican	January 8, 2003	January 12, 2005	2 years, 4 days
Karen Minnis		Oregon	House of Representatives	Republican	January 13, 2003	January 3, 2007	3 years, 355 days
Gaye Symington		Vermont	House of Representatives	Democratic	January 5, 2005	January 8, 2009	4 years, 3 days
Terie Norelli		New Hampshire	House of Representatives	Democratic	December 6, 2006	December 1, 2010	3 years, 360 days
Terie Norelli		New Hampshire	House of Representatives	Democratic	December 5, 2012	December 3, 2014	1 year, 363 days
Margaret Anderson Kelliher		Minnesota	House of Representatives	Democratic–Farmer–Labor	January 3, 2007	January 4, 2011	4 years, 1 day
Barbara Buckley		Nevada	Assembly	Democratic	February 5, 2007	February 7, 2011	4 years, 2 days
Karen Bass (Note: First African-American woman elected Speaker of a state legislative body First woman of color elected Speaker of a state legislative body)		California	State Assembly	Democratic	May 13, 2008	March 1, 2010	1 year, 292 days
Hannah Pingree		Maine	House of Representatives	Democratic	December 3, 2008	December 6, 2010	2 years, 3 days
Sheila Oliver		New Jersey	General Assembly	Democratic	January 12, 2010	January 14, 2014	4 years, 2 days
Beth Harwell		Tennessee	House of Representatives	Republican	January 13, 2011	January 8, 2019	7 years, 360 days
Rebecca D. Lockhart		Utah	House of Representatives	Republican	January 24, 2011	January 17, 2015	3 years, 358 days
Tina Kotek (Note: First openly LGBT (lesbian) woman elected Speaker of a state legislative body)		Oregon	House of Representatives	Democratic	January 14, 2013	January 16, 2022	9 years, 2 days
Marilyn Kirkpatrick		Nevada	Assembly	Democratic	February 4, 2013	February 2, 2015	1 year, 363 days
Toni Atkins		California	State Assembly	Democratic	May 12, 2014	March 7, 2016	1 year, 300 days
Dickey Lee Hullinghorst		Colorado	House of Representatives	Democratic	January 7, 2015	January 11, 2017	2 years, 4 days
Linda Upmeyer		Iowa	House of Representatives	Republican	January 14, 2016	January 13, 2020	3 years, 364 days
Sara Gideon		Maine	House of Representatives	Democratic	December 7, 2016	December 2, 2020	3 years, 361 days
Mitzi Johnson		Vermont	House of Representatives	Democratic	January 4, 2017	January 6, 2021	4 years, 2 days
Crisanta Duran (Note: First Hispanic and Latina American woman elected Speaker of a state legislative body)		Colorado	House of Representatives	Democratic	January 11, 2017	January 4, 2019	1 year, 358 days
KC Becker		Colorado	House of Representatives	Democratic	January 4, 2019	January 13, 2021	2 years, 9 days
Melissa Hortman		Minnesota	House of Representatives	Democratic–Farmer–Labor	January 8, 2019	January 14, 2025	6 years, 6 days
Adrienne A. Jones		Maryland	House of Delegates	Democratic	April 7, 2019	December 4, 2025	6 years, 241 days
Eileen Filler-Corn		Virginia	House of Delegates	Democratic	January 8, 2020	January 11, 2022	2 years, 3 days
Laurie Jinkins		Washington	House of Representatives	Democratic	January 13, 2020	Incumbent	6 years, 303 days
Jill Krowinski		Vermont	House of Representatives	Democratic	January 6, 2021	Incumbent	5 years, 310 days
Louise Stutes		Alaska	House of Representatives	Republican (Bipartisan Coalition)	February 11, 2021	January 17, 2023	1 year, 340 days
Jan Jones		Georgia	House of Representatives	Republican	November 16, 2022	January 9, 2023	54 days
Rachel Talbot Ross		Maine	House of Representatives	Democratic	December 7, 2022	December 4, 2024	1 year, 363 days
Julie McCluskie		Colorado	House of Representatives	Democratic	January 9, 2023	Incumbent	3 years, 307 days
Cathy Tilton		Alaska	House of Representatives	Republican	January 18, 2023	January 21, 2025	2 years, 3 days
Joanna McClinton		Pennsylvania	House of Representatives	Democratic	February 28, 2023	Incumbent	3 years, 257 days
Valerie Longhurst		Delaware	House of Representatives	Democratic	June 30, 2023	November 5, 2024	1 year, 128 days
Julie Fahey		Oregon	House of Representatives	Democratic	March 7, 2024	Incumbent	2 years, 250 days
Nadine Nakamura		Hawaii	House of Representatives	Democratic	November 6, 2024	Incumbent	2 years, 6 days
Melissa Minor-Brown		Delaware	House of Representatives	Democratic	January 14, 2025	Incumbent	1 year, 302 days
Lisa Demuth		Minnesota	House of Representatives	Republican	February 6, 2025	Incumbent	1 year, 279 days
Joseline Peña-Melnyk		Maryland	House of Delegates	Democratic	December 16, 2025	Incumbent	331 days

== Territorial and the District of Columbia ==
Denotes incumbent speaker

Name	Image	Territory	Legislative Body	Party	Mandate start	Mandate end	Term length
María Libertad Gómez Garriga		Puerto Rico	House of Representatives	Liberal	1945	1945	?
Ruby M. Rouss		United States Virgin Islands	Legislature	Democratic	January 12, 1981	January 11, 1982	364 days
Ruby M. Rouss		United States Virgin Islands	Legislature	Democratic	January 12, 1987	March 9, 1987	56 days
Lorraine Berry		United States Virgin Islands	Legislature	Democratic	January 13, 1997	January 12, 1998	364 days
Lorraine Berry		United States Virgin Islands	Legislature	Democratic	January 10, 2005	January 8, 2007	1 year, 363 days
Linda W. Cropp		District of Columbia	Council	Democratic	July 22, 1997	January 3, 2007	9 years, 165 days
Judith Won Pat		Guam	Legislature	Democratic	March 7, 2008	January 2, 2017	8 years, 301 days
Jenniffer González		Puerto Rico	House of Representatives	New Progressive/ Republican	January 12, 2009	January 1, 2013	3 years, 355 days
Tina Rose Muña Barnes		Guam	Legislature	Democratic	January 7, 2019	January 4, 2021	1 year, 363 days
Therese M. Terlaje		Guam	Legislature	Democratic	January 4, 2021	January 6, 2025	4 years, 2 days
Donna Frett-Gregory		United States Virgin Islands	Legislature	Democratic	January 11, 2021	January 13, 2023	2 years, 2 days
