= Larry Bellew =

American politician (born 1952)

Speaker of the North Dakota House of Representatives
- In office December 5, 2016 – December 3, 2018
- Preceded by: Wesley Belter
- Succeeded by: Lawrence Klemin

Member of the North Dakota House of Representatives from the 38th district
- In office December 1, 2000 – December 31, 2023
- Preceded by: Stacey Mickelson
- Succeeded by: JoAnne Rademacher

Personal details
- Born: July 5, 1952 (age 74) Havre, Montana, U.S.
- Party: Republican
- Education: University of Guelph

Larry Bellew (born July 5, 1952) is an American politician. He is a former member of the North Dakota House of Representatives from the 38th District, serving from 2000 to 2023, and is a member of the Republican party. He served as Speaker of the North Dakota House of Representatives during the 2017-19 biennium.

Bellew was born in Montana and currently lives in Minot, North Dakota in District 38. He holds an A.A. degree in horticulture from the University of Guelph. He served in the United States Air Force from 1971 to 1975.

Bellew resigned from the North Dakota House in December 2023 in order to move out of the state.

Political offices
Preceded by Wesley Belter	Speaker of the North Dakota House of Representatives; 2016–2018	Succeeded by Lawrence Klemin
