= Pamela Anderson (politician) =

American politician

Member of the North Dakota House of Representatives from the 41st district
- In office December 1, 2014 – December 1, 2022
- Preceded by: Bette Grande
- Succeeded by: Jorin Johnson

Personal details
- Born: October 23, 1950 (age 76) Fargo, North Dakota, U.S.
- Party: Democratic
- Spouse: Wayne T. Anderson (died 2013)
- Children: 3
- Education: University of North Dakota (BA, MA)

Pamela Anderson (born October 23, 1950) is an American politician and former banker serving as a member of the North Dakota House of Representatives from the 41st district.

== Early life and education ==
Pamela Anderson was born in Fargo, North Dakota. Growing up in Minnewaukan, North Dakota, she became class president in her junior and senior years and graduated valedictorian of her class. She studied at the University of North Dakota and obtained both her bachelor's and master's in economics.

== Career ==
=== Banking ===
In 1973, she moved back to Fargo where she pursued a career in banking. From 1973 to 1990, she was the vice president of U.S. Bank. She left U.S. bank in 1990 and started a career at Wells Fargo the same year. She worked at Wells Fargo from 1990 to 2005 where she was the senior vice president regional trust manager. In 2005, she retired from Wells Fargo and in 2014 she was elected to the North Dakota House of Representatives.

=== Politics ===
Anderson first ran for North Dakota's 41st district for the Democratic ticket in 2014 and defeated incumbent Republican Bette Grande. Anderson won re-election in 2018. Anderson introduced a bill to increase the legal age of using tobacco products to 19 years of age unless the individual is active military and penned a letter explaining her ideas on how to help small businesses that are being affected by COVID-19.

== Personal life ==
She married Wayne T. Anderson, a practicing lawyer in Fargo for 35 years, and had three children. Wayne died on July 12, 2013. She has four grandchildren.
