= Dennis Johnson (North Dakota politician) =

American politician (born 1949)

Speaker of the North Dakota House of Representatives
- In office December 5, 2022 – December 1, 2024
- Preceded by: Kim Koppelman
- Succeeded by: Robin Weisz

Member of the North Dakota House of Representatives
- In office 1992 – December 1, 2024
- Constituency: 12th district (1992-2002); 15th district (2002-2024)

Personal details
- Born: 1949 (age 76–77) Oberon, North Dakota, U.S.
- Party: Republican

Dennis Johnson (born 1949) is an American politician. He is a former member of the North Dakota House of Representatives from the 15th District, serving from 1992 to 2024. He is a member of the Republican party.

Johnson did not seek re-election in 2024.

Political offices
Preceded by Kim Koppelman	Speaker of the North Dakota House of Representatives; 2022–2024	Succeeded by Robin Weisz
