= Minnie D. Craig =

American politician (1883–1966)

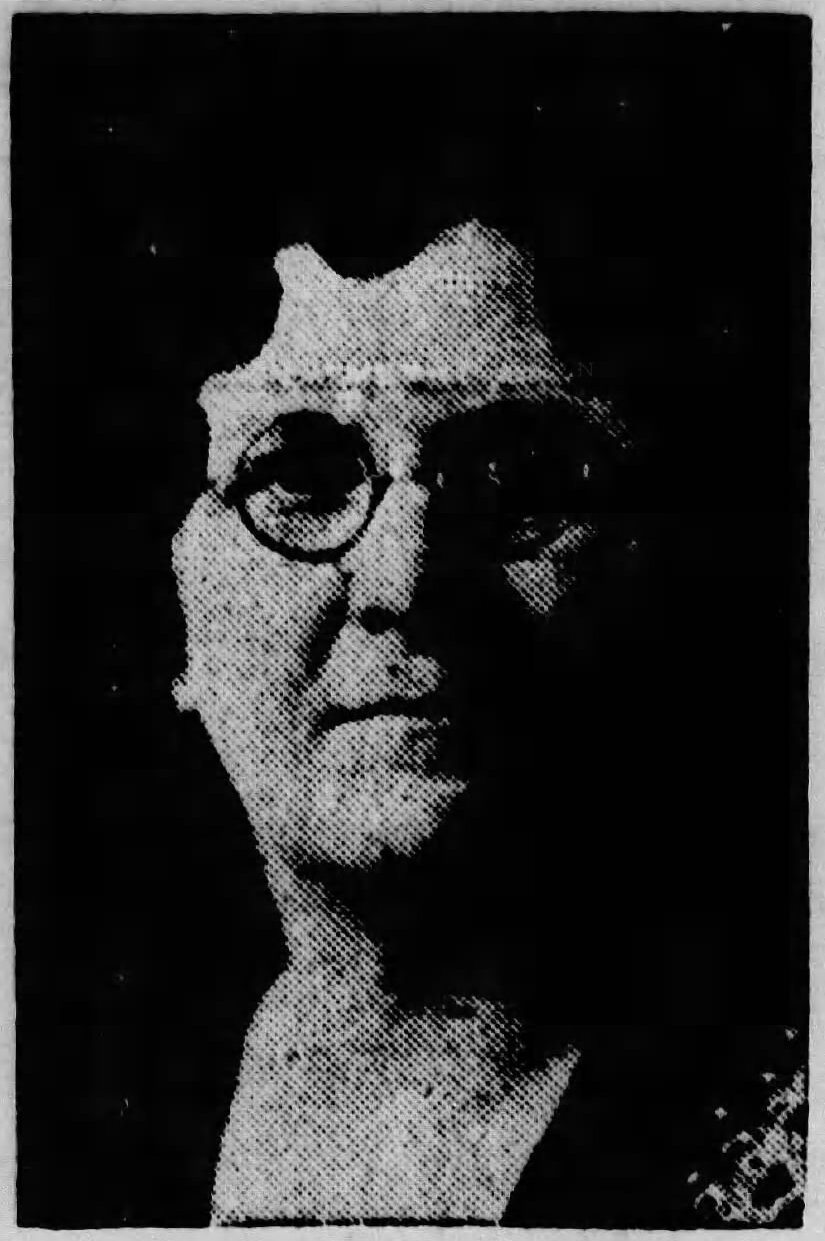

23rd Speaker of the North Dakota House of Representatives
- In office January 3, 1933 – January 8, 1935
- Preceded by: Charles V. Freeman
- Succeeded by: William Crockett

Member of the North Dakota House of Representatives from the 20th district
- In office 1922–1939

Personal details
- Born: November 4, 1883 Phillips, Maine
- Died: July 2, 1966 (aged 82) Farmington, Maine
- Party: Republican/NPL
- Spouse: Edward Craig
- Education: New England Conservatory of Music
- Profession: Politician

Minnie Craig (née Davenport, November 4, 1883 – July 2, 1966) was an American legislator, notable as the first female speaker of a state House of Representatives in the United States.

Born in Phillips, Maine on November 4, 1883 to Marshall and Aura (Prescott) Davenport, Minnie Davenport was a bright student. After graduating from the Farmington State Normal School she attended the New England Conservatory of Music and became a school teacher. She married Edward Craig in July, 1908, and they moved from Maine to Esmond, North Dakota where Edward was president of a bank. Both Craig and her husband became involved in the Nonpartisan League, and in 1923, just three years after women won the right to vote, she was elected to the North Dakota House of Representatives. She became known by the affectionate nickname, "Min", but also had a reputation as a serious and meticulous legislator. A 1927 report noted, 1

Mrs. M. Craig watches every move that is made and is ready to blast any presumptuous member with that cold, withering glance that the members know so well and dread so much.

Craig served six consecutive sessions in the State legislature. During this time she also held the position of state president of the Non-Partisan League, and was a Republican National Committee woman from 1928 to 1932. In addition to forging her own political career, Craig encouraged other women to become politically active:

There's a field – a grand one for women – in politics, but women must ... play politics as women and not as weak imitations of their 'lords and masters.' Men are all to inclined to 'stuff' a lady full of nonsense, treat her with not to much respect for her intellect and be far happier when she's nicely tucked away in some corner where she can do them no harm – and herself no good. But it doesn't have to be that way. ... She has certain natural talents which men don't have. Women are naturally given to detail ... If they weren't, they couldn't make pies or sew dresses. Men don't like details. Because of woman's training ... she's more thorough than man and right there she has a splendid opportunity for politics.

On January 3, 1933, she made history when she was elected Speaker of the House, the first time a woman had led a legislative body in the USA (in a permanent capacity). However, the session proved challenging for Craig. The House assembled in a temporary auditorium as the State Capitol had been consumed by fire. In addition, North Dakota was suffering from an agricultural depression caused by drought. Her tenure as an elected member of the legislature ended with that session, when she left to become a state worker for the Federal Emergency Relief Administration. The following year she returned to the House in an administrative role, as assistant to the chief clerk. In the 1937 and 1939 sessions she fulfilled the role of chief clerk.

On her retirement, Craig and her husband moved to California. She began writing an autobiography but, at 99 pages, left it unfinished around the time of the death of her husband in 1947. Craig moved back to Phillips, Maine, in 1959 and died in Farmington on July 2, 1966.

Minnie D. Craig's collected papers, consisting of her handwritten autobiography, correspondence, pamphlets and scrapbooks detailing her political and family life, are held at the North Dakota State University Institute for Regional Studies. The United Nations declared 1975 "International Women's Year" and North Dakota chose the occasion to honor Craig for her pioneering work.

== See also ==
- List of speakers of the North Dakota House of Representatives
- List of female speakers of legislatures in the United States
