= Lawrence Klemin =

American politician and lawyer

Speaker of the North Dakota House of Representatives
- In office December 3, 2018 – December 14, 2020
- Preceded by: Larry Bellew
- Succeeded by: Kim Koppelman

Member of the North Dakota House of Representatives from the 47th district
- Incumbent
- Assumed office December 1, 1998
- Preceded by: Ralph Kilzer
- Succeeded by: Jon Lee (elect)

Personal details
- Born: March 31, 1945 (age 81) New Rockford, North Dakota, U.S.
- Party: Republican
- Spouse: Rita
- Education: University of North Dakota (BA, JD)

Lawrence R. Klemin (born March 31, 1945) is an American politician and lawyer in the state of North Dakota. He is a member of the North Dakota House of Representatives, representing the 47th district. A Republican, he was first elected in 1998. Klemin attended the University of North Dakota where earned a Bachelor of Arts degree, and the University of North Dakota School of Law. Admitted to the bar in 1978, he later worked as an attorney in the practice Bucklin, Klemin and McBride. Klemin is also a veteran of the Vietnam War, serving in the United States Army's 101st Airborne Division.

Political offices
Preceded by Larry Bellew	Speaker of the North Dakota House of Representatives; 2018–2020	Succeeded by Kim Koppelman
