= LeRoy Hausauer =

American politician (1920–2002)

Member of the North Dakota House of Representatives
- In office 1971–1998

Speaker of the North Dakota House of Representatives
- In office 1985–1986
- Preceded by: Patricia Kelly
- Succeeded by: Richard W. Kloubec

Personal details
- Born: April 12, 1920 Ortonville, Minnesota, U.S.
- Died: September 24, 2002 (aged 82) Lake Havasu City, Arizona, U.S.
- Party: Republican
- Education: University of North Dakota

LeRoy Hausauer (April 12, 1920 – September 24, 2002) was an American politician. He served as a Republican member of the North Dakota House of Representatives.

== Life and career ==
Hausauer was born in Ortonville, Minnesota. He attended Wahpeton High School and the University of North Dakota. He served in the United States Army during World War II.

Hausauer served in the North Dakota House of Representatives from 1971 to 1998.

Hausauer died on September 24, 2002, in Lake Havasu City, Arizona, at the age of 82.
