= Theron Strinden =

American politician

Theron Strinden (May 26, 1919 – March 3, 2011) was an American politician and businessman from North Dakota.

Born in Litchville, North Dakota, Strinden went to college and then served in the United States Army during World War II. After the war, he returned to Litchville to work in his family's hardware and farm implement business. From 1963 to 1967 and 1969 to 1981, he served in the North Dakota State Senate and was President Pro Tempore of the North Dakota Senate. His younger brother Earl Strinden served in the North Dakota House of Representatives.
