= Vicky Steiner =

American politician (born 1956)

Member of the North Dakota House of Representatives from the 37th district
- Incumbent
- Assumed office December 1, 2010
- Preceded by: Francis J. Wald

Personal details
- Born: January 1, 1956 (age 70) Dickinson, North Dakota, U.S.
- Party: Republican

Vicky Steiner (born January 1, 1956) is an American politician who has served in the North Dakota House of Representatives from the 37th district since 2010.
