= Treadwell Twichell =

American politician (1864–1937)

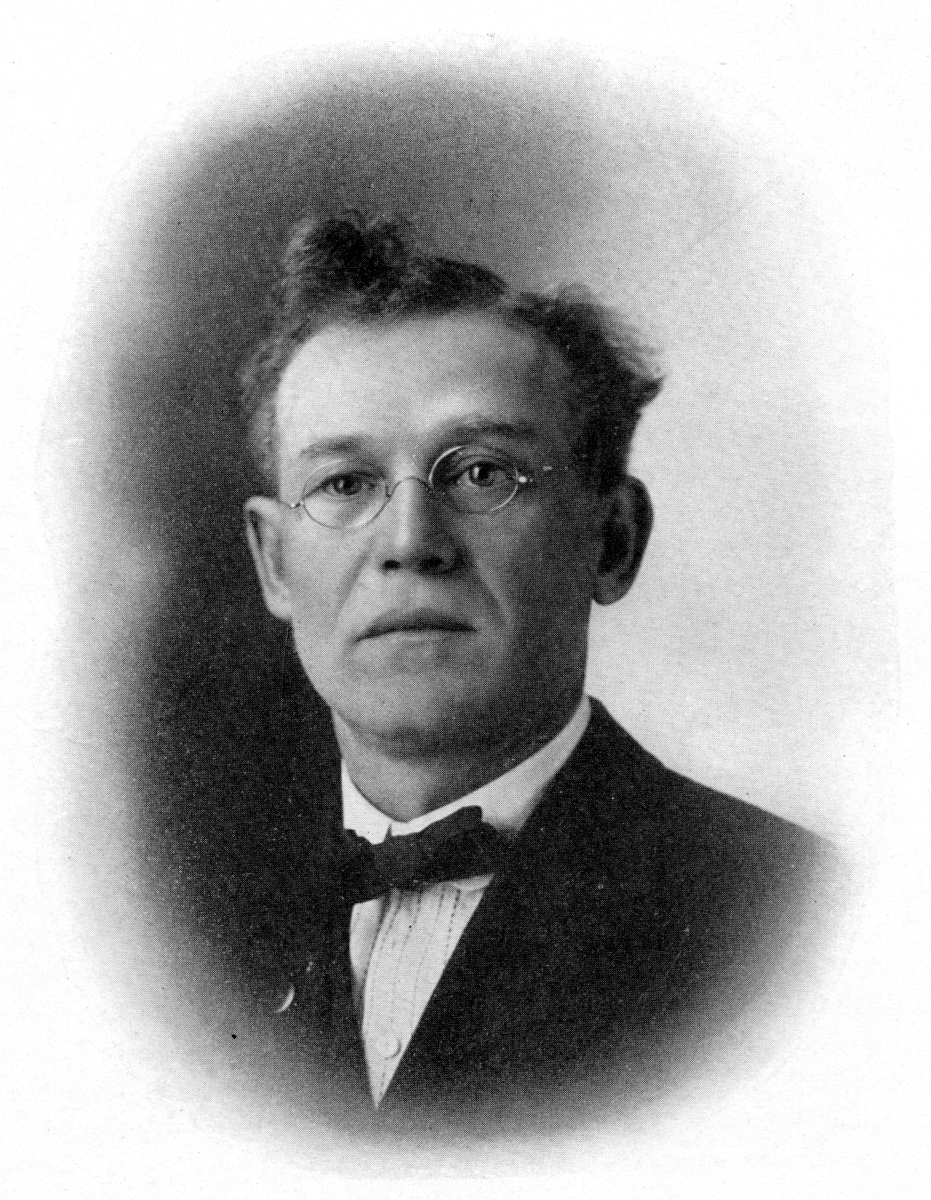

Speaker of the North Dakota House of Representatives
- In office 1907–1909

Member of the North Dakota Senate
- In office 1899–1901
- In office 1915–1917

Member of the North Dakota House of Representatives
- In office 1895–1899
- In office 1907–1909
- In office 1913–1915

Sheriff of Cass County
- In office 1901–1905

Personal details
- Party: Republican
- Spouse: Grace B. Dill
- Children: Four
- Parent(s): Luther L. Twichell; Sally Twichell

Treadwell Twichell (November 19, 1864 – December 24, 1937) was an American politician who served in both the North Dakota Senate and the House of Representatives and was also elected as North Dakota Speaker in 1907.

== Early life ==
Twichell was born on November 19, 1864, in Hastings, Minnesota, United States, the son of Luther L. and Sally Twichell. After his father's death in 1880, Treadwell, then 17, left high school and went to Dakota Territory to manage his late father's land holdings near Mapleton, North Dakota. Treadwell would remain involved in agriculture for the rest of his life. Treadwell had a sibling, Luther Lathrop, who would also be elected as Speaker in 1921. On November 26, 1890, Treadwell married Grace B. Dill of Prescott, Wisconsin, with whom he had four children.

== Political career ==
Twichell was elected to two terms in the North Dakota House of Representatives, in 1895 and 1897. In 1899, he was elected to the North Dakota Senate. From 1901 to 1905, Treadwell served as Sheriff of Cass County. In 1907, he was once again elected to the House of Representatives where he became Speaker. In 1908, Twichell was nominated for governor at the Progressive Republican Convention but lost to his opponent in the primary. Mr. Twichell was again elected to the House of Representatives in 1913 and the Senate in 1915. He was known as an advocate of reform legislation and battled aggressively against boss rule in state politics. He was a delegate to the 1912 national Republican convention and a longtime township official. He is credited with building the first gravel highway in North Dakota and organizing the first cooperative grain elevator enterprise in the state.

== Death ==
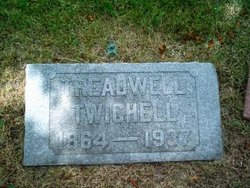
The grave of Treadwell Twichell

Twichell died on December 24, 1937, in Mapleton, North Dakota, where he was buried.
