= Denton Zubke =

American politician (born 1954)

Member of the North Dakota House of Representatives from the 39th district
- Incumbent
- Assumed office December 1, 2014
- Preceded by: David Drovdal

Personal details
- Born: August 21, 1954 (age 71) Grassy Butte, North Dakota, U.S.
- Party: Republican

Denton Zubke (born August 21, 1954) is an American politician who has served in the North Dakota House of Representatives from the 39th district since 2014.
