= Kylan Klauzer =

American politician

Member-elect of the North Dakota House of Representatives from the 37th district
- Assuming office December 2026
- Succeeding: Mike Lefor

Personal details
- Party: Republican

Kylan Klauzer is an American politician. A member of the Republican Party, he is the member-elect for the 37th district of the North Dakota House of Representatives.
