= Riverside (New England, North Dakota) =

- U.S. National Register of Historic Places
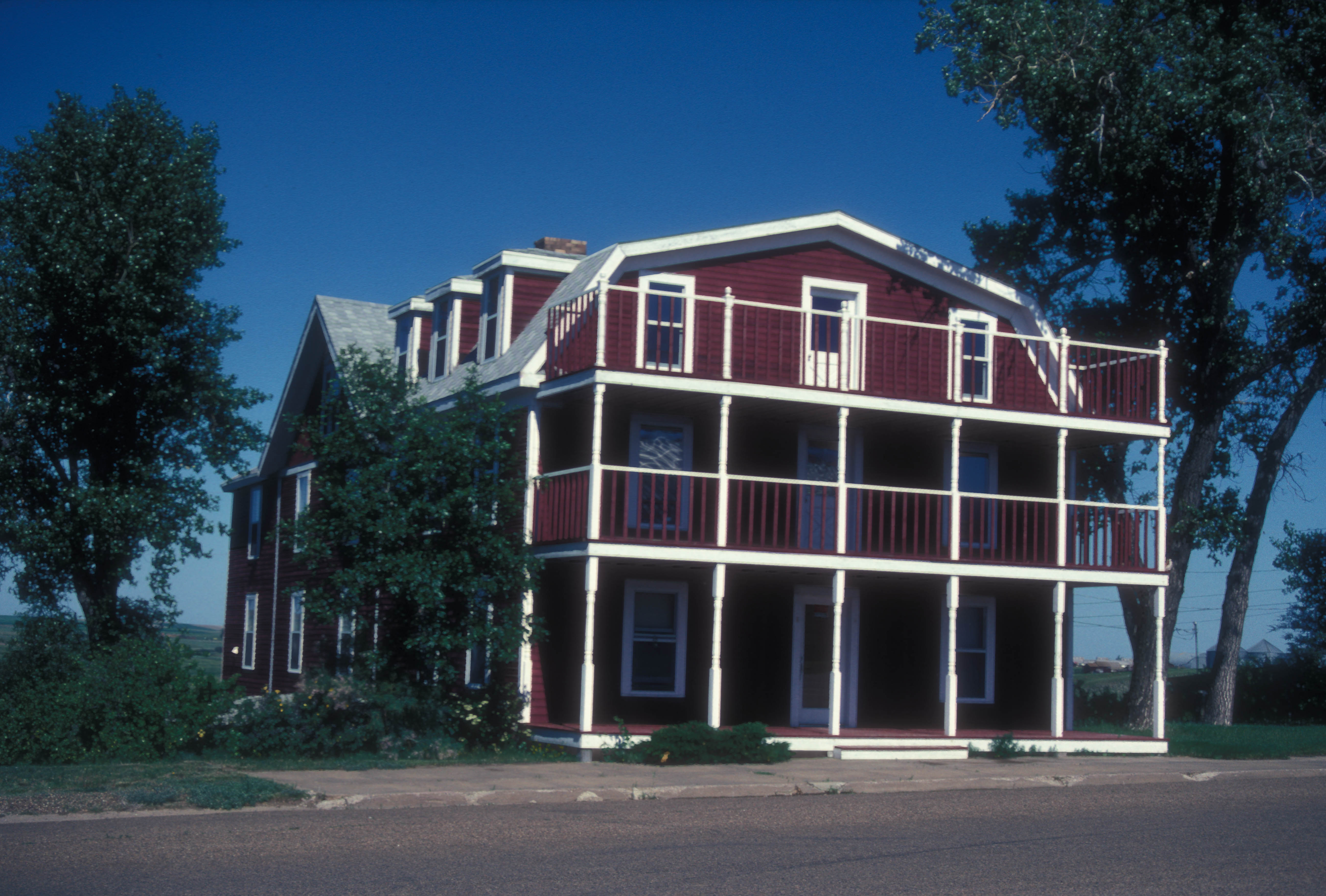

- Location within North Dakota Location within the United States
- Location: 418 Main St., New England, North Dakota
- Coordinates: 46°32′6″N 102°52′3″W
- Area: 3.2 acres (1.3 ha)
- Built: 1887
- NRHP reference No.: 83001937
- Added to NRHP: May 12, 1983

Riverside on Main St. in New England, North Dakota, was built in 1887. It has also been known as McKenzie Hotel. It was listed on the National Register of Historic Places in 1983. The listing included two contributing buildings on 3.2 acres (1.3 ha).

The original part of the hotel was one of New England's first buildings, built in 1887. It was later expanded by William C. McKenzie.
