= Presiding Officer =

In a general sense, presiding officer is synonymous with chairperson.

== Politics ==
- Llywydd of the Senedd, Presiding Officer of the Welsh Parliament
- Presiding Officer of the Northern Ireland Assembly
- Presiding Officer of the Scottish Parliament, the speaker of the Scottish Parliament
- Presiding Officer of the United States Senate, the person who presides over the United States Senate
- Presiding officer, a person responsible for overseeing a polling station
- List of current presidents of assembly

== Military ==
- Presiding Officer (ARB), is the officer in charge of one of the Administrative Review Boards run by the United States Office for the Administrative Review of Detained Enemy Combatants, at the Guantanamo Bay detention camps, in Cuba
- Presiding Officer (Guantanamo Military Commissions), the U.S. officer acting in a judge-like role for Guantanamo Military Commissions

== See also ==
- Moderator (disambiguation)
- Presiding bishop
- Speaker (politics)
