= 1988 United States Senate election in North Dakota =

- November 8, 1988
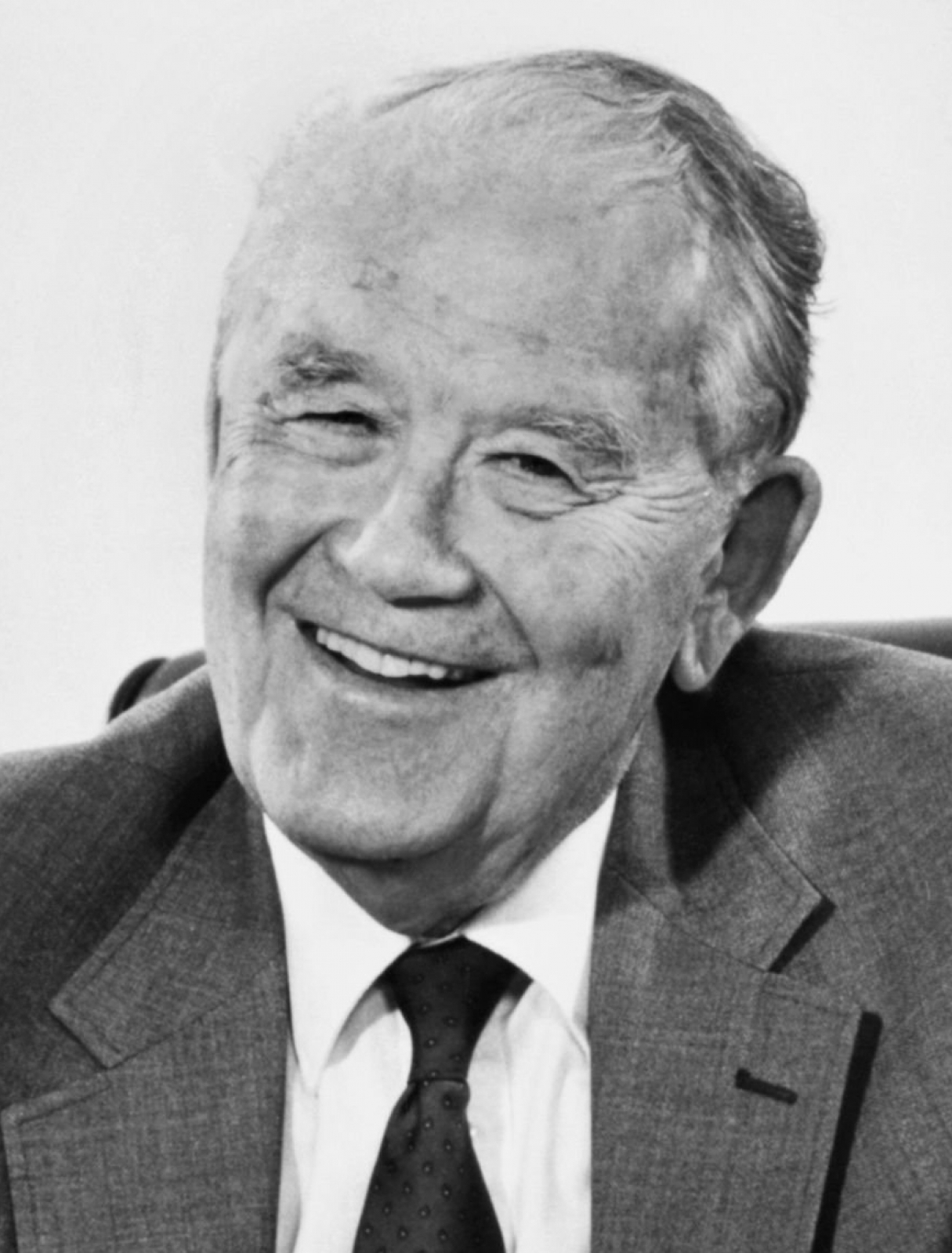

Nominee	Quentin Burdick	Earl Strinden
Party	Democratic–NPL	Republican
Popular vote	171,899	112,937
Percentage	59.45%	39.06%
- County results Burdick: 50–60% 60–70% 70–80% Strinden: 40–50% 50–60%
U.S. Senator before election
Quentin Burdick
Democratic
Elected U.S. Senator
Quentin Burdick
Democratic

The 1988 U.S. Senate election for the state of North Dakota was held November 8, 1988. Incumbent Democratic-NPL Senator Quentin Burdick won re-election to his sixth term, defeating Republican candidate Earl Strinden.

Only Burdick filed as a Dem-NPLer, and the endorsed Republican candidate was Earl Strinden of Grand Forks, North Dakota, who was President of the University of North Dakota Alumni Association. As in the Burdick's previous re-election campaign, the senator's age became an issue for voters as he was 80 years old during the campaign. However, challenger Strinden commented that he did not want to raise the age issue. Burdick and Strinden won the primary elections for their respective parties.

The Burdick campaign hired high-profile Washington, D.C. campaign consultant Bob Squire of Squire Eskew Communications. To counter the potential age issue, Burdick successfully focused the message on the "clout" he had earned over decades in the Senate, as well as his Chairmanship of Senate Agricultural Appropriations sub-committee and his Chairmanship of the Senate Environment and Public Works Committee.

One independent candidate, Kenneth C. Gardner, also filed before the deadline, officially calling himself a libertarian. Gardner had previously run for North Dakota's other United States Senate seat as an independent in 1974, challenging Milton Young. He only received 853 votes in that election.

== Election results ==
1988 United States Senate election in North Dakota
Party	Candidate	Votes	%
Democratic–NPL	Quentin Burdick (incumbent)	171,899	59.45%
Republican	Earl Strinden	112,937	39.06%
Libertarian	Kenneth C. Gardner	4,334	1.50%
Total votes		289,170	100.00%
Democratic–NPL hold			

== See also ==
- 1988 United States Senate elections
