= Chet Pollert =

American politician (born 1955)

Majority Leader of the North Dakota House of Representatives
- In office December 3, 2018 – December 5, 2022
- Preceded by: Al Carlson
- Succeeded by: Mike Lefor

Member of the North Dakota House of Representatives from the 29th district
- Incumbent
- Assumed office December 1998

Personal details
- Born: April 20, 1955 (age 71) Valley City, North Dakota, U.S.
- Party: Republican
- Education: Valley City State University (BA)

Chet Pollert (born April 20, 1955) is an American politician. He is a member of the North Dakota House of Representatives from the 29th District, serving since 1998. He is a member of the Republican party.

In November 2018, members of the House Majority Republican party chose Pollert as their Majority Leader. In the North Dakota legislature, the Majority Leader holds the most powerful position in the chamber (as opposed to most states, where the Speaker of the House holds this position). The previous leader, Representative Al Carlson was defeated in his reelection campaign.

North Dakota House of Representatives
Preceded by Al Carlson	Majority Leader of the North Dakota House of Representatives; 2018–2022	Succeeded by Mike Lefor
