= Jorin Johnson =

American politician

Member of the North Dakota House of Representatives from the 41st district
- Incumbent
- Assumed office December 1, 2022 Serving with Michelle Strinden

Personal details
- Party: Republican

Jorin Johnson is an American politician. He is serving as a member of the North Dakota House of Representatives from the 41st district, alongside Michelle Strinden. He is a member of the Republican Party. In 2025, Johnson sponsored a bill which would defund Prairie Public Broadcasting with Johnson stating that "public money could be better spent on education, health care or infrastructure."

In 2026, Johnson did not seek reelection.
