= Maddock, North Dakota =

- City
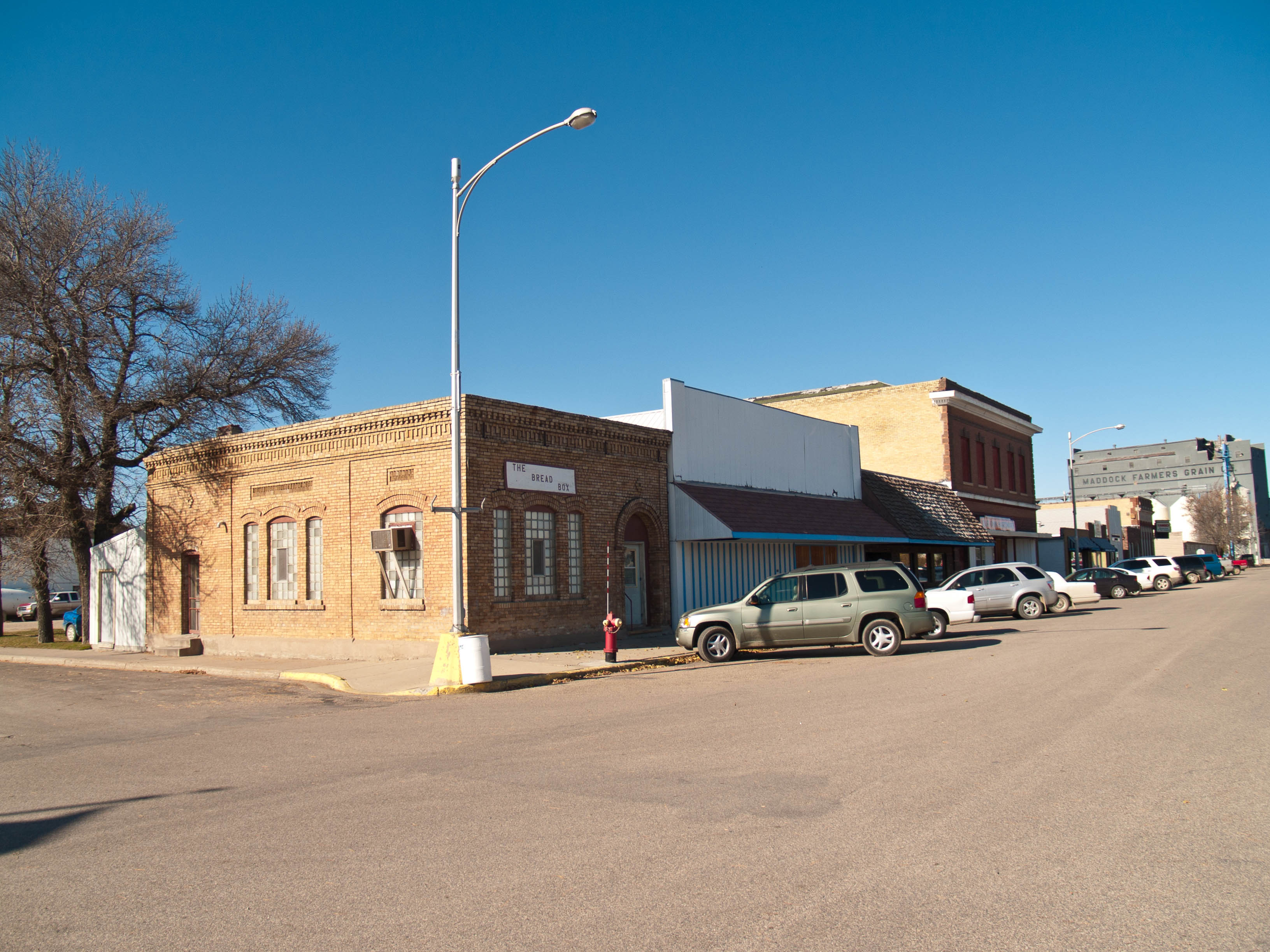

- Logo

- Location of Maddock, North Dakota

- Location within North Dakota Location within the United States
- Coordinates: 47°57′45″N 99°31′45″W
- Country: United States
- State: North Dakota
- County: Benson
- Founded: 1901

Area
  - Total: 0.88 sq mi (2.28 km^{2})
  - Land: 0.88 sq mi (2.28 km^{2})
  - Water: 0 sq mi (0.00 km^{2})
- Elevation: 1,581 ft (482 m)

Population (2020)
  - Total: 402
  - Estimate (2022): 385
  - Density: 455.8/sq mi (175.99/km^{2})
- Time zone: UTC-6 (Central (CST))
  - Summer (DST): UTC-5 (CDT)
- ZIP code: 58348
- Area code: 701
- FIPS code: 38-49620
- GNIS feature ID: 1036144
- Website: www.maddocknd.com

Maddock is a city in Benson County, North Dakota, United States. The population was 402 at the 2020 census. Maddock was founded in 1901.

== Geography ==
According to the United States Census Bureau, the city has a total area of 0.89 square miles (2.31 km^{2}), all land.

== Demographics ==
Historical population
Census	Pop.	Note	%±
1910	374		—
1920	557		48.9%
1930	631		13.3%
1940	691		9.5%
1950	741		7.2%
1960	740		−0.1%
1970	708		−4.3%
1980	677		−4.4%
1990	559		−17.4%
2000	498		−10.9%
2010	382		−23.3%
2020	402		5.2%
2022 (est.)	385		−4.2%
U.S. Decennial Census; 2020 Census

=== 2010 census ===
As of the census of 2010, there were 382 people, 196 households, and 103 families living in the city. The population density was 429.2 inhabitants per square mile (165.7/km^{2}). There were 253 housing units at an average density of 284.3 per square mile (109.8/km^{2}). The racial makeup of the city was 95.5% White, 0.3% African American, 3.1% Native American, 0.3% Asian, and 0.8% from two or more races. Hispanic or Latino of any race were 1.6% of the population.

There were 196 households, of which 19.4% had children under the age of 18 living with them, 42.9% were married couples living together, 7.1% had a female householder with no husband present, 2.6% had a male householder with no wife present, and 47.4% were non-families. 43.4% of all households were made up of individuals, and 21.4% had someone living alone who was 65 years of age or older. The average household size was 1.95 and the average family size was 2.69.

The median age in the city was 49.3 years. 18.6% of residents were under the age of 18; 6.9% were between the ages of 18 and 24; 19.3% were from 25 to 44; 30.7% were from 45 to 64; and 24.6% were 65 years of age or older. The gender makeup of the city was 50.8% male and 49.2% female.

=== 2000 census ===
As of the census of 2000, there were 498 people, 238 households, and 127 families living in the city. The population density was 564.7 inhabitants per square mile (218.0/km^{2}). There were 276 housing units at an average density of 313.0 per square mile (120.8/km^{2}). The racial makeup of the city was 99.60% White, 0.20% Native American, and 0.20% from two or more races. Hispanic or Latino of any race were 0.20% of the population.

There were 238 households, out of which 19.7% had children under the age of 18 living with them, 41.6% were married couples living together, 7.1% had a female householder with no husband present, and 46.6% were non-families. 45.0% of all households were made up of individuals, and 31.5% had someone living alone who was 65 years of age or older. The average household size was 1.92 and the average family size was 2.67.

In the city, the population was spread out, with 16.9% under the age of 18, 3.0% from 18 to 24, 20.5% from 25 to 44, 18.9% from 45 to 64, and 40.8% who were 65 years of age or older. The median age was 53 years. For every 100 females, there were 85.1 males. For every 100 females age 18 and over, there were 78.4 males.

The median income for a household in the city was $23,636, and the median income for a family was $32,500. Males had a median income of $23,750 versus $16,042 for females. The per capita income for the city was $15,662. About 9.6% of families and 13.0% of the population were below the poverty line, including 8.2% of those under age 18 and 13.1% of those age 65 or over.

== Climate ==
This climatic region is typified by large seasonal temperature differences, with warm to hot (and often humid) summers and cold (sometimes severely cold) winters. According to the Köppen Climate Classification system, Maddock has a humid continental climate, abbreviated "Dfb" on climate maps.
