= Ernest Norman Johnson =

American politician

Member of the North Dakota House of Representatives
- In office 1959–1971

Speaker of the North Dakota House of Representatives
- In office 1969–1971
- Preceded by: Gordon Aamoth
- Succeeded by: Howard Bier

Personal details
- Born: May 9, 1915 Cooperstown, North Dakota, U.S.
- Died: April 4, 2015 (aged 99) Cape Cod, Massachusetts, U.S.
- Party: Republican
- Spouse: Della Nelson (m. 1938)
- Children: 2
- Occupation: farmer

Ernest Norman Johnson (May 9, 1915 – April 4, 2015) was an American politician in the state of North Dakota. He served in the North Dakota House of Representatives from 1959 to 1971, and as Speaker of the House in 1969. He died at the age of 99 in 2015.
