= Wesley Belter =

American politician (born 1945)

Speaker of the North Dakota House of Representatives
- In office December 1, 2014 – December 1, 2016
- Preceded by: David Drovdal
- Succeeded by: Larry Bellew

Member of the North Dakota House of Representatives from the 22nd district
- In office January 1985 – December 2016
- Succeeded by: Michael Howe

Personal details
- Born: April 18, 1945 (age 81) Leonard, North Dakota, U.S.
- Party: Republican
- Spouse: Judy
- Education: North Dakota State University

Military service
- Branch/service: United States Air Force
- Unit: Air National Guard

Wesley R. Belter (born April 18, 1945) is an American politician who served as a member of the North Dakota House of Representatives, representing the 22nd district. A Republican, he was first elected in 1984. An alumnus of North Dakota State University, he also worked as a farmer. He has also served in the United States Air Force and Air National Guard.
