= Robin Weisz =

American politician

Speaker of the North Dakota House of Representatives
- Incumbent
- Assumed office January 7, 2025
- Preceded by: Dennis Johnson

Member of the North Dakota House of Representatives from the 14th district
- Incumbent
- Assumed office 1996

Personal details
- Born: May 30, 1956 (age 69) Bismarck, North Dakota, U.S.
- Party: Republican
- Education: University of North Dakota (attended)

Robin Weisz (born May 30, 1956) is an American politician. He is a member of the North Dakota House of Representatives from the 14th District, serving since 1996. He is a member of the Republican party.

Political offices
Preceded by Dennis Johnson	Speaker of the North Dakota House of Representatives; 2025–present	Incumbent
