= Al Carlson (politician) =

Republican politician in North Dakota

Majority Leader of the North Dakota House of Representatives
- In office January 3, 2009 – December 3, 2018
- Preceded by: Rick Berg
- Succeeded by: Chet Pollert

Member of the North Dakota House of Representatives from the 41st district
- In office December 1992 – December 3, 2018
- Succeeded by: Michelle Strinden

Personal details
- Born: November 21, 1948 (age 77) Breckenridge, Minnesota, U.S.
- Party: Republican
- Education: North Dakota State College of Science; North Dakota State University (BA)

Al Carlson (born November 21, 1948) is a Republican politician in North Dakota. He was a member of the North Dakota House of Representatives from the 41st district, serving from 1992 to 2018. Carlson was the chamber's majority leader from 2009 to 2018.

Carlson was defeated in the 2018 general election by Michelle Strinden.

North Dakota House of Representatives
Preceded by Rick Berg	Majority Leader of the North Dakota House of Representatives; 2009–2018	Succeeded by Chet Pollert
