= Clarence Martin (North Dakota politician) =

American politician

Member of the North Dakota House of Representatives
- In office 1975–1997

Speaker of the North Dakota House of Representatives
- In office 1995–1996
- Preceded by: Rick Berg
- Succeeded by: Mike Timm

Personal details
- Born: May 3, 1929 Lefor, North Dakota, U.S.
- Died: February 9, 1997 (aged 67)
- Party: Republican

Clarence Martin (May 3, 1929 – February 9, 1997) was an American politician. He served as a Republican member of the North Dakota House of Representatives.

== Life and career ==
Martin was born in Lefor, North Dakota. He attended Lefor High School.

Martin served in the North Dakota House of Representatives from 1975 to 1997.

Martin died on February 9, 1997, at the age of 67.
