= Austen Schauer =

American politician

Austen Schauer is an American politician. He is a member of the North Dakota House of Representatives from District 13. He is a member of the Republican Party. He currently lives in West Fargo, North Dakota. He is married to Angela Tracy, whom he had three children with.

== Life ==
Austen was born in Turtle Lake. However, he went to school in Portland and Sacramento. After graduating high school, he moved back to North Dakota. While in North Dakota, Austen's father took a job as a pastor at Hebron Baptist Church. He got his Associate Arts degree in broadcasting at Dickinson State College. He would then transfer to University of North Dakota, where he would get his Bachelor in Science in speech. He started his news broadcasting career in 1977, and ended it in 2013. After leaving his news broadcasting career, he worked in the fundraising and development field. Then, he got a job at ProSource, a recruiting team in Fargo.
