= Howard Bier =

American politician (1919–2025)

Speaker of the North Dakota House of Representatives
- In office 1971–1972
- Preceded by: Ernest Johnson
- Succeeded by: A. G. "Art" Bunker

Member of the North Dakota House of Representatives
- In office 1959–1972

Personal details
- Born: Howard Floyd Bier; August 20, 1919 Bismarck, North Dakota, United States
- Died: May 16, 2025 (aged 105) Bismarck, North Dakota, United States
- Party: Republican
- Spouses: Irene Foell (m. 1943; died 1988); Melvena McLeish (m. 1988; died 2025)
- Children: 2 sons and 1 daughter
- Education: North Dakota State College of Science

Military service
- Allegiance: United States
- Years of service: 1942-1945

Howard Floyd Bier (August 20, 1919 – May 16, 2025) was an American politician in the state of North Dakota and World War 2 veteran.

== Life and career ==
During World War 2, he was stationed in Italy and fixed airplanes for the United States Army Air Forces.

He served in the North Dakota House of Representatives from 1959 to 1972, and as Speaker of the House from 1971 to 1972.

Bier married Melvena Beahm McLeish (1920–2025) in October 1988. They split between living in Hazelton, North Dakota most of the year and Mesa, Arizona, in the winter until 2000, when they moved to Bismarck, North Dakota full-time.

He turned 100 in August 2019. In 2023, he was said to be in good health and sharp, albeit with some hearing loss.

Bier died on May 16, 2025, at the age of 105.
