= Moderator =

Moderator may refer to:

== Government ==
- Moderator (town official), elected official who presides over the Town Meeting form of government in various American states.

== Internet ==
- Internet forum moderator, a person given special authority to enforce the rules on a forum or social media platforms
- Game moderator
- Moderator of a Usenet newsgroup
- Google Moderator, an application to assist chairmen of online meetings

== Religion ==
- Moderator of the General Assembly, the chairperson of the highest court in Presbyterian and Reformed churches
- Moderators and clerks in the Church of Scotland, the chairperson of any of the courts of the Church of Scotland
- Moderator of the curia, an administrative position in the Catholic church

== Nuclear engineering ==
- Neutron moderator, a medium that reduces the velocity of fast neutrons, for example in a nuclear reactor

== Other uses ==
- Moderator variable, in statistics, a qualitative or quantitative variable that affects the direction and/or strength of the relation between dependent and independent variables
- Sound moderator, a suppressor attached to a firearm
- A faction in the Regulator–Moderator War
- Discussion moderator, a person who controls the tone of a discussion or debate
