= William Kretschmar =

American politician (1933–2017)

William E. Kretschmar

Member of the North Dakota House of Representatives
- In office 2000–2016
- Succeeded by: Jeffery Magrum
- Constituency: 28th district
- In office 1973–1998
- Constituency: 30th district

Personal details
- Born: August 21, 1933 Saint Paul, Minnesota, US
- Died: August 18, 2017 (aged 83) Bismarck, North Dakota, US
- Party: Republican
- Profession: Attorney

William Edward Kretschmar (August 21, 1933 – August 18, 2017) was an American politician who was a member of the North Dakota House of Representatives. He represented the 28th district as a Republican, having been re-elected in 2000 and serving until 2016. He also served another term in the House, from 1973 to 1998. During his first term, he was Speaker of the House briefly from 1988 to 1990. Kretschmar lived in Venturia, North Dakota. He was alumnus of the College of Saint Thomas, of Saint Paul, Minnesota, and the University of Minnesota, and was an attorney by profession. He was of German descent. He was a self-described "Rockefeller Republican" and died on August 18, 2017.
