= David Drovdal =

American politician (born 1945)

Member of the North Dakota House of Representatives from the 39th district
- In office January 5, 1993 – 2013
- Succeeded by: Denton Zubke

Personal details
- Born: March 29, 1945 (age 81) Portland, Oregon, U.S.
- Party: Republican
- Education: Minot State University

David Drovdal (born March 29, 1945) is an American politician from the state of North Dakota. A member of the Republican Party, Drovdal represents District 39 in the North Dakota House of Representatives.

Drovdal was elected to the North Dakota House in 1992. He was elected as Speaker following the 2010 elections, and served in the role through 2012.
