= Mike Lefor =

American politician

Majority Leader of the North Dakota House of Representatives
- Incumbent
- Assumed office December 5, 2022
- Preceded by: Chet Pollert

Member of the North Dakota House of Representatives
- Succeeded by: Kylan Klauzer (elect)

Personal details
- Party: Republican
- Education: Dickinson State College (BS)

Michael Lefor is an American politician. First elected in 2014, he sits in the North Dakota House of Representatives, where he serves as Majority Leader. Prior to his election as Majority Leader, he chaired the House Industry, Business, and Labor Committee as well as the interim Retirement Committee. Lefor is also the president of Blackridge Enterprises LLC.

Lefor is married to Sherryl Lefor with three children (Brett, Scott, and Andi) and two grandsons (Kai and Jaxx). He is an alumnus of Dickinson State University.

North Dakota House of Representatives
Preceded by Chet Pollert	Majority Leader of the North Dakota House of Representatives; 2022–present	Incumbent
