= Earl Strinden =

American politician (1931–2022)

Earl Strinden (November 28, 1931 – October 18, 2022) was an American Republican politician in the state of North Dakota and president of the University of North Dakota Alumni Association, serving from 1974 until his retirement in 2000. He served as House Majority Leader in the North Dakota House of Representatives for several years and then ran for the United States Senate against Quentin Burdick in 1988, but was unsuccessful. He also served on the Grand Forks, North Dakota City Council. He also was the founder of the UND Foundation.

His older brother was Theron Strinden, who served in the North Dakota State Senate. His grandson, Thomas Beadle, served in the North Dakota House until his election as State Treasurer in 2020. His daughter-in-law, Michelle Strinden, has served as the Lieutenant Governor of North Dakota since 2024.

Strinden died on October 18, 2022, at the age of 90.

== See also ==
- 1988 United States Senate election in North Dakota

== Notes ==
Party political offices
Preceded by Gene Knorr	Republican nominee for U.S. Senator from North Dakota (Class 1); 1988	Succeeded by Jack Dalrymple
