= LeRoy G. Bernstein =

American politician (1930–2017)

Member of the North Dakota House of Representatives from the 45th district
- In office 1989–2006

Personal details
- Born: May 16, 1930 Minneapolis, Minnesota, U.S.
- Died: January 4, 2017 (aged 86) Fargo, North Dakota, U.S.
- Party: Republican
- Spouse: Kathy

LeRoy George Bernstein (May 16, 1930 – January 4, 2017) was an American politician who was a member of the North Dakota House of Representatives. He served from 1989 to 2006. Bernstein was president of a moving company and a veteran of the Korean War. He was Speaker of the North Dakota House of Representatives from 2001 to 2003. Bernstein died in Fargo, North Dakota on January 4, 2017, at the age of 86.
