= Rick Berg =

American politician (born 1959)

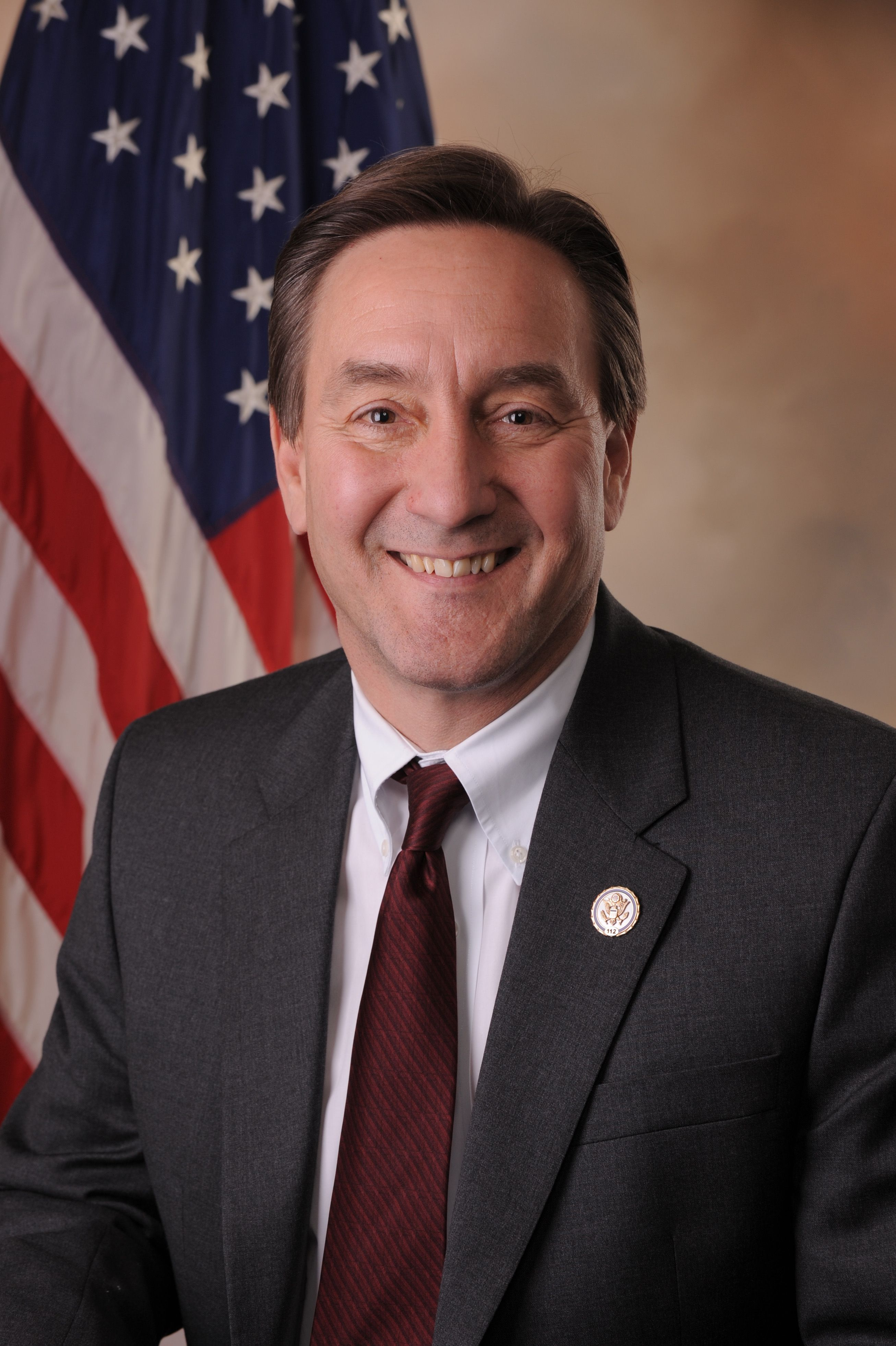

President of North Dakota State University
- Acting
- In office February 9, 2026 – May 25, 2026
- Preceded by: David Cook
- Succeeded by: Marshall Stewart

Chair of the North Dakota Republican Party
- In office March 20, 2018 – June 21, 2021
- Preceded by: Jim Poolman (acting)
- Succeeded by: Perrie Schafer

Member of the U.S. House of Representatives from North Dakota's at-large district
- In office January 3, 2011 – January 3, 2013
- Preceded by: Earl Pomeroy
- Succeeded by: Kevin Cramer

Majority Leader of the North Dakota House of Representatives
- In office January 3, 2003 – January 3, 2009
- Preceded by: Wesley Belter
- Succeeded by: Al Carlson

Speaker of the North Dakota House of Representatives
- In office January 1993 – January 1995
- Preceded by: Ronald Anderson
- Succeeded by: Clarence Martin

Member of the North Dakota House of Representatives from the 45th district
- In office January 3, 1985 – January 3, 2011
- Preceded by: Steve Swiontek
- Succeeded by: Joe Heilman

Personal details
- Born: Richard Alan Berg; August 16, 1959 (age 67) Maddock, North Dakota, U.S.
- Party: Republican
- Spouse: Tracy Martin
- Education: North Dakota State College of Science; North Dakota State University (BA)

Richard Alan Berg (born August 16, 1959) is an American businessman and politician who previously served as the U.S. representative for North Dakota's at-large congressional district from 2011 to 2013. Berg served on the House Ways and Means Committee. He is a member of the Republican Party. Before his election to Congress in 2010, he served in the state North Dakota House of Representatives, with stints as majority leader and speaker. On May 16, 2011, Berg announced his run for the United States Senate seat being vacated by Democratic incumbent Kent Conrad but lost narrowly to Democrat Heidi Heitkamp on November 6, 2012. Berg also served as interim president of North Dakota State University from February to May of 2026.

== Early life and education ==
Berg was born in Maddock and raised on a farm in Hettinger. His father was a large animal veterinarian and his mother was a writer. His grandfather immigrated to the United States from Norway.

Berg graduated from Hettinger High School. He earned a wrestling scholarship to the North Dakota State College of Science. He attended for a year before transferring to North Dakota State University, where he graduated with a Bachelor of Arts degree in agricultural economics.

== Early career ==
In 1982, after college he co-founded Midwest Management Company (which became Goldmark Property Management in 1994), a real-estate management firm in Fargo. In 1987 he moved on to an affiliate commercial real estate company spun off from Midwest. In 1996 along with other early partners in Midwest he founded Goldmark Commercial Corporation which has since been renamed to Goldmark Schlossman Commercial Real Estate.

=== North Dakota House of Representatives ===
==== Elections ====
Berg first ran for the North Dakota House of Representatives in 1984 in the 10th House District, based in Fargo. He won and was re-elected every four years after, until his congressional run in 2010.

In 2002, after redistricting he decided to run in the newly redrawn 45th House District, and won a seat with 31%. In 2006, he won re-election with 28%.

==== Tenure ====
In 1991, he became the chair of the House Republican caucus. In 1993, he briefly served as speaker of the House. In 2003, he became the House majority leader.

As speaker, he proposed a controversial new education funding system aimed at making payments more equitable.

Berg supported President George W. Bush's plan to partially privatize Social Security through private accounts in 2005.

In 2007, Berg voted on ND House Bill 1489, which proposed making abortion a class AA felony, even in the case of rape and incest.

In 2009, he earned the Petroleum Council's Legislator of the Year and the North Dakota Chamber of Commerce's Greater North Dakotan award.

== U.S. House of Representatives ==
=== Election ===
On January 20, 2010, Berg officially announced he was seeking the GOP endorsement to run for the United States House of Representatives. In March 2010, Berg won the GOP nomination at the Republican state convention to challenge incumbent Democratic Representative Earl Pomeroy for the state's at-large seat in the United States House of Representatives. In the general election Berg unseated Pomeroy 55% to 45% becoming the first Republican since 1980 to represent North Dakota's at-large congressional district. At the time of his election, Berg was the 13th wealthiest member of Congress.

The biggest donor to Berg's campaign was Goldmark Property Management, Inc. As of 2011, Berg worked at Goldmark since 1981 and was promoted to Senior Vice President of Goldmark Schlossman Commercial Real Estate Services in 2005.

=== Tenure ===
Berg voted for the Paul Ryan budget, which would restructure Medicare and Medicaid.

Berg strongly supports a balanced-budget amendment to the Constitution.

He voted in favor of the National Right-to-Carry Reciprocity Act and has received "A" and "A+" ratings from the NRA Political Victory Fund for his stance on gun rights.

Berg joined almost 60 other members of Congress in a letter to the Joint Select Committee on Deficit Reduction that urged committee members not to cut the critical access hospital (CAH) program. The CAH program provides assistance to rural hospitals. 36 CAHs exist in North Dakota, including one in Hettinger, Berg's hometown.

Berg has voted to curtail EPA regulations, stating: "In North Dakota, we know the damaging effects that overreaching government regulations can have on our small businesses and their ability to create jobs." He has also proposed drilling for oil in federal lands, including North Dakota's own Theodore Roosevelt National Park, as a way to provide funding for Social Security. In 2009, he was presented with the Greater North Dakotan Award by the North Dakota Chamber of Commerce for his support of business interests.

Berg is anti-abortion and has voted to prohibit federal funds from being used for health care plans that cover abortions. He is a member of the Congressional Prayer Caucus.

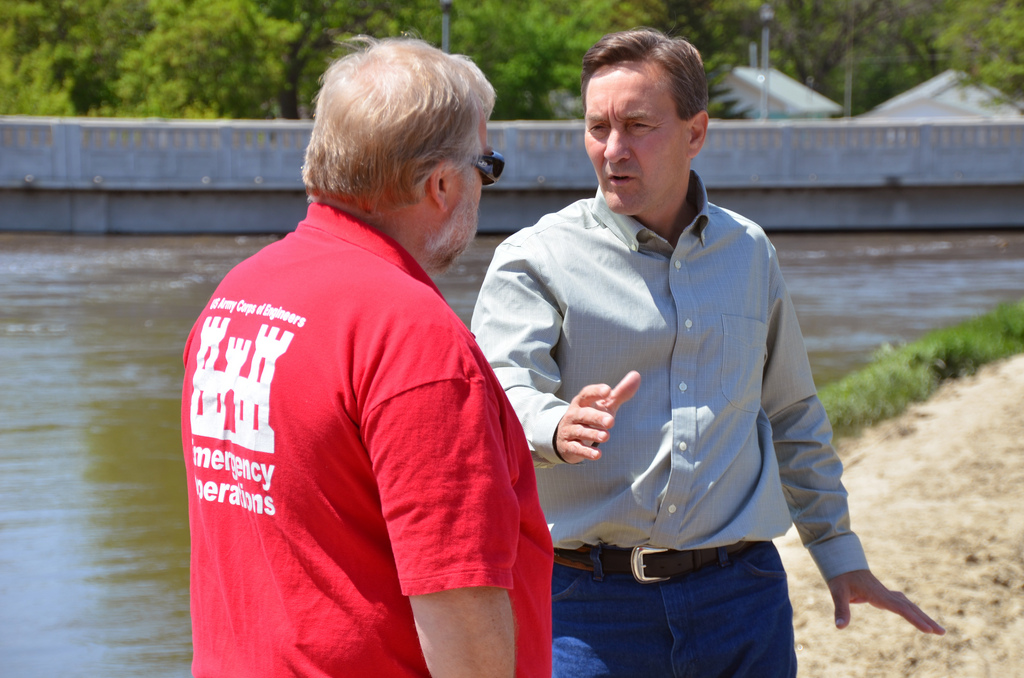
Berg talking with U.S. Army Corps of Engineers official Roland Hamborg during the 2011 Souris River flood

=== Committee assignments ===
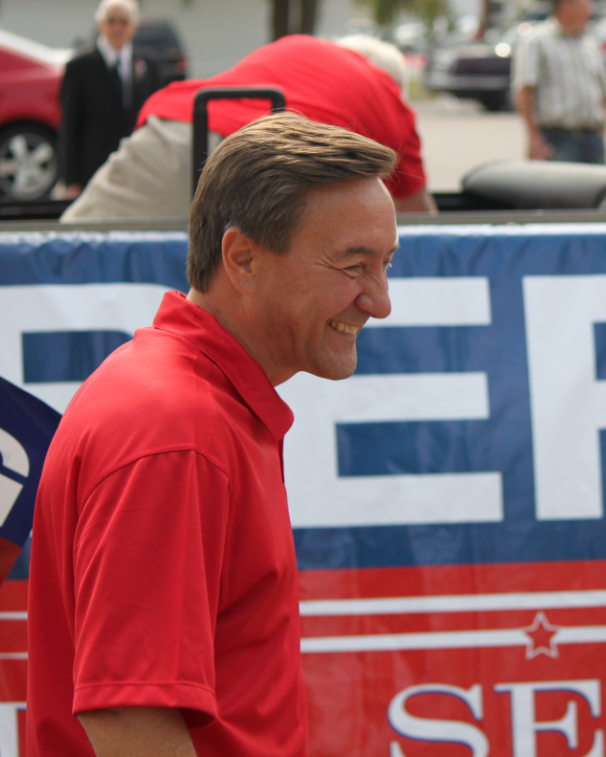
Berg, at a parade in West Fargo.

Berg was a member of the U.S. House Ways & Means Committee.

Caucus Memberships

- Congressional Western Caucus
- Unmanned Systems Caucus
- General Aviation Caucus
- Coal Caucus
- Friends of Norway Caucus
- Job Creators Caucus
- E-911 Caucus
- National Archives Caucus
- Rural Health Care Coalition
- Sportsman Caucus
- Sugar Caucus
- Congressional Prayer Caucus
- House National Guard and Reserve Caucus

== 2012 U.S. Senate election ==
On May 16, 2011, Berg announced he would run for the United States Senate seat being vacated by Democratic incumbent Kent Conrad.

Election night results indicated that Berg had lost to former state Attorney General Heidi Heitkamp by 2,936 votes. As the difference was less than 1% of the ballots cast, Berg declined to concede immediately. The next day, however, Berg acknowledged Heitkamp's victory.

Political offices
Preceded by Ronald Anderson	Speaker of the North Dakota House of Representatives; 1993–1995	Succeeded by Clarence Martin
North Dakota House of Representatives
Preceded by Wesley Belter	Majority Leader of the North Dakota House of Representatives; 2003–2009	Succeeded by Al Carlson
U.S. House of Representatives
Preceded by Earl Pomeroy	Member of the U.S. House of Representatives from North Dakota's at-large congressional district 2011–2013	Succeeded by Kevin Cramer
Party political offices
Preceded by Dwight Grotberg	Republican nominee for U.S. Senator from North Dakota (Class 1); 2012	Succeeded by Kevin Cramer
Preceded by Jim Poolman; Acting	Chair of the North Dakota Republican Party; 2018–2021	Succeeded by Perrie Schafer
U.S. order of precedence (ceremonial)
Preceded by Yadira Caraveo as Former U.S. Representative	Order of precedence of the United States as Former U.S. Representative	Succeeded by Mike Kreidler as Former U.S. Representative
