= List of United States political families (S) =

The following is an alphabetical list of political families in the United States whose last name begins with S.

== Sabos ==
- Martin Olav Sabo (1938–2016), Minnesota state representative 1961–1978, U.S. Representative from Minnesota 1979–2007, delegate to the Democratic National Convention 1984 2000 2004. Father of Julie Sabo.
  - Julie Sabo (born 1966), Minnesota state senator 2001–2003. Daughter of Martin Olav Sabo.

== Salazars ==
- John Salazar (born 1953), Colorado state representative 2003–2004, U.S. Representative from Colorado 2005–2011, Colorado Commissioner of Agriculture 2011–2014. Brother of Ken Salazar.
- Ken Salazar (born 1955), Attorney General of Colorado 1999–2005, U.S. Senator from Colorado 2005–2009, U.S. Secretary of the Interior 2009–2013, U.S. Ambassador to Mexico 2021-2025. Brother of John Salazar.

== Salmons ==
- Thomas P. Salmon (1932–2025), Municipal Court Judge in Vermont 1963, Vermont state representative 1965, Governor of Vermont 1973–1977, candidate for U.S. Senate from Vermont 1976. Father of Thomas M. Salmon.
  - Thomas M. Salmon (born 1963), Auditor of Vermont 2007–2013. Son of Thomas P. Salmon.

== Salomons ==
- Edward Salomon (1828–1909), Lieutenant Governor of Wisconsin 1860–1862, Governor of Wisconsin 1862–1864, delegate to the 1868 Republican National Convention. Cousin of Edward S. Salomon.
- Edward S. Salomon (1836–1913), Governor of Washington Territory 1870–1872, California Assemblyman 1889–1891. Cousin of Edward Salomon.

== Saltonstalls ==
See Saltonstall family

== Samfords ==
- William J. Samford (1844–1901), U.S. Representative from Alabama 1879–1881, Governor of Alabama 1900–1901. Father of William Hodges Samford and Thomas D. Samford.
  - William Hodges Samford (1866–1940), delegate to the Alabama Constitutional Convention 1901, Judge of the Alabama Court of Appeals 1917. Son of William J. Samford.
  - Thomas D. Samford, Alabama Democratic Executive Committeeman 1896–1898, U.S. Attorney in Alabama 1913–1924 1934–1942. Son of William J. Samford.

== Sammons and Starins ==
- Thomas Sammons (1762–1838), U.S. Representative from New York 1803–1807 1809–1813. Grandfather of John H. Starin.
  - John H. Starin (1825–1909), Postmaster of Fultonville, New York 1848–1852; U.S. Representative from New York 1877–1881. Grandson of Thomas Sammons.

== Sanchezes ==
- Linda Sánchez, Congresswoman from California.
- Loretta Sanchez, Congresswoman from California. Sister of Linda Sánchez.

== Sanders of Louisiana ==
- Jared Y. Sanders Sr. (1869–1944), Louisiana state representative 1892–1896 1898–1904, delegate to the Louisiana Constitutional Convention 1898 1921, Lieutenant Governor of Louisiana 1904–1908, Governor of Louisiana 1908–1912, U.S. Representative from Louisiana 1917–1921, candidate for Democratic nomination for U.S. Senate from Louisiana 1920 1926, delegate to the Democratic National Convention 1924. Father of Jared Y. Sanders Jr.
  - Jared Y. Sanders Jr. (1892–1960), Louisiana state representative 1928–1932, Louisiana state senator 1932–1934, U.S. Representative from Louisiana 1934–1937 1941–1943, delegate to the Democratic National Convention 1940 1944. Son of Jared Y. Sanders Sr.

NOTE: Jared Y. Sanders Sr. was also cousin of U.S. Senator Murphy J. Foster.

== Sanders of New York ==
- John Sanders, New York Assemblyman. Father of Archie D. Sanders.
  - Archie D. Sanders (1857–1941), New York Assemblyman 1895–1896, delegate to the Republican National Convention 1896 1924 1932, Collector of Internal Revenue in New York 1898–1913, New York Republican Committeeman 1900–1901, New York state senator 1914–1915, U.S. Representative from New York 1917–1933, chairman of the Genesee County, New York Republican Committee. Son of John Sanders.
    - Harry D. Sanders (1874–1953), delegate to the New York Constitutional Convention 1915. Nephew of Archie D. Sanders.

== Sanders of Vermont ==
- Bernie Sanders (born 1941), Mayor of Burlington 1981–1989, U.S. Representative from Vermont 1991–2007, U.S. Senator from Vermont since 2007. Father of Levi Sanders and stepfather of Carina Driscoll.
  - Carina Driscoll (born 1973), Vermont state representative 2001–2003, candidate for Mayor of Burlington 2018. Stepdaughter of Bernie Sanders.
  - Levi Sanders (born 1969), candidate for U.S. Representative from New Hampshire 2018. Son of Bernie Sanders.
- Larry Sanders (born 1935), British politician, Democratic Party National Delegate for Democrats Abroad. Brother of Bernie Sanders.

== Sandlins and the Learys ==
- Nicholas J. Sandlin (1832–1896), district attorney in North Louisiana, member of the Webster Parish Police Jury, the parish governing body, from Ward 3 near Minden, Louisiana, 1877–1888; member of the Louisiana House of Representatives 1892–1893, postmaster in Minden, father of McIntyre H. Sandlin and John N. Sandlin and first cousin once removed and uncle by marriage of A. M. Leary
  - McIntyre H. Sandlin (1870–1955), mayor of Minden, Louisiana, 1894–1896; member of the Louisiana House of Representatives, 1896–1900, son of Nicholas J. Sandlin, brother of John N. Sandlin, and cousin of A. M. Leary
  - John N. Sandlin (1872–1957), postmaster in Minden, member of the Minden City Council, district attorney of Bossier and Webster parishes, member of the United States House of Representatives from Louisiana's 4th congressional district, son of Nicholas J. Sandlin and brother of McIntyre H. Sandlin
  - Alexander McIntyre Leary Sr., mayor of Minden, 1903–1905, cousin of Nicholas, McIntyre, and John Sandlin

== Sanfords ==
- Jonah Sanford (1790–1867), Justice of the Peace in New York 1818–1840, Supervisor of Hopkinton, New York 1823–1826; New York Assemblyman 1829–1830; U.S. Representative from New York 1830–1831; Judge of Court of Common Pleas in New York 1831–1837; delegate to the New York Constitutional Convention 1846. Great-grandfather of Rollin B. Sanford.
  - Rollin B. Sanford (1874–1957), Prosecuting Attorney of Albany County, New York 1908–1914; U.S. Representative from New York 1915–1921. Great-grandson of Jonah Sanford.

== Sanfords of Connecticut and New York ==
- Nehemiah Curtis Sanford (1792–1841), Connecticut state senator. Brother of John Sanford.
- John Sanford (1803–1857), U.S. Representative from New York 1841–1843. Brother of Nehemiah Curtis Sanford.
  - Henry Shelton Sanford (1823–1891), U.S. Chargé d'Affaires to France 1853–1854, U.S. Minister to Belgium 1861–1869. Son of Nehemiah Curits Sanford.
  - Stephen Sanford (1826–1913), U.S. Representative from New York 1869–1871, delegate to the Republican National Convention 1876. Son of John Sanford.
    - John Sanford (1851–1939), U.S. Representative from New York 1889–1893, delegate to the Republican National Convention 1892. Son of Stephen Sanford.

NOTE: Nehemiah Curtis Sanford's wife, Nancy Bateman Shelton, was also a descendant of Connecticut Colony Governor Thomas Welles.

== Sanfords of Rhode Island ==
- John Sanford (1605–1654), Governor of Newport and Portsmouth 1653–1654. Father of Peleg Sanford.
  - Peleg Sanford (1639–1701), Governor of Rhode Island Colony 1680–1683. Son of John Sanford.

NOTE: Peleg Sanford was also son-in-law of Rhode Island Colony Governor William Coddington.

== Sapps ==
- William R. Sapp (1804–1875), U.S. Representative from Ohio 1853–1857. Uncle of William Fletcher Sapp.
  - William Fletcher Sapp (1824–1890), candidate for Prosecuting Attorney of Knox County, Ohio 1850; Prosecuting Attorney of Knox County, Ohio; Adjutant General of Nebraska Territory; Nebraska Territory Councilman; Iowa state representative 1865; District Attorney of Iowa 1869–1873; U.S. Representative from Iowa 1877–1881. Nephew of William R. Sapp.

== Sarbanes ==
- Paul Sarbanes (1933–2020), Clerk of U.S. Court of Appeals in Maryland 1960–1961, Maryland House Delegate 1967–1971, U.S. Representative from Maryland 1971–1977, U.S. Senator from Maryland 1977–2007, delegate to the Democratic National Convention 2000 2004. Father of John Sarbanes and Michael Sarbanes.
  - John Sarbanes (born 1962), U.S. Representative from Maryland 2007–2025, delegate to the Democratic National Convention 2008. Son of Paul Sarbanes and older brother of Michael Sarbanes.
  - Michael Sarbanes (born 1964), candidate for president of Baltimore, Maryland City Council (2007). Son of Paul Sarbanes, younger brother of John Sarbanes.

== Satterfields ==
- Dave E. Satterfield Jr. (1894–1946), Commonwealth Attorney of Richmond, Virginia 1922–1933; U.S. Representative from Virginia 1937–1945. Father of David E. Satterfield III.
  - David E. Satterfield III (1920–1988), Virginia House Delegate 1960–1964, U.S. Representative from Virginia 1965–1981. Son of David E. Satterfield Jr.

== Saulsburys ==
- Gove Saulsbury (1815–1881), Delaware state senator 1863–1864 1865–1866, Governor of Delaware 1865–1871, candidate for U.S. Senate from Delaware, delegate to the Democratic National Convention 1876. Brother of Eli Saulsbury and Willard Saulsbury Sr.
- Eli Saulsbury (1817–1893), Delaware state representative 1853–1854, U.S. Senator from Delaware 1871–1889. Brother of Gove Saulsbury and Willard Saulsbury Sr.
- Willard Saulsbury Sr. (1820–1892), Attorney General of Delaware 1850–1855, U.S. Senator from Delaware 1859–1871, Chancellor of Delaware 1879–1892. Brother of Gove Saulsbury and Eli Saulsbury.
  - Willard Saulsbury Jr. (1861–1927), Democratic National Committeeman 1908–1920, candidate for U.S. Senate from Delaware 1899, U.S. Senator from Delaware 1913–1919. Son of Willard Saulsbury Sr.

NOTE: William Saulsbury Sr. was also brother-in-law of Delaware Governor James Ponder.

== Saxbes ==
- William B. Saxbe (1916–2010), Ohio state representative 1947–1954, Attorney General of Ohio 1957–1958 1963–1968, U.S. Senator from Ohio 1969–1974, Attorney General of the United States 1974–1975, U.S. Ambassador to India 1975–1976. Father of Charles R. Saxbe.
  - Charles R. Saxbe (born 1946), Ohio state representative 1975–1982, candidate for Attorney General of Ohio 1982. Son of William B. Saxbe.

== Saylers ==
- Milton Sayler (1831–1892), Ohio state representative 1862–1863, Cincinnati, Ohio Councilman 1864–1865; U.S. Representative from Ohio 1873–1879. Cousin of Henry B. Sayler.
- Henry B. Sayler (1836–1900), U.S. Representative from Indiana 1873–1875, Circuit Court Judge in Indiana 1875–1900. Cousin of Milton Sayler.

== Saylors ==
- Tillman K. Saylor, delegate to the Republican National Convention 1924. Father of John P. Saylor.
  - John P. Saylor (1908–1973), U.S. Representative from Pennsylvania 1949–1973, delegate to the Republican National Convention 1972. Son of Tillman K. Saylor.

== Scalias ==
- Antonin Scalia (1936–2016), Chair of the Administrative Conference of the United States 1972–1974, United States Assistant Attorney General for the Office of Legal Counsel 1974–1977, Judge of the United States Court of Appeals for the District of Columbia Circuit 1982–1986, Associate Justice of the Supreme Court of the United States 1986–2016.
  - Eugene Scalia (born 1963), United States Solicitor of Labor 2002–2003, United States Secretary of Labor 2019–2021. Son of Antonin Scalia.

== Schells ==
- Richard Schell (1810–1879), New York state senator 1858–1859, U.S. Representative from New York 1874–1875. Brother of Augustus Schell.
- Augustus Schell (1812–1884), chairman of the New York Democratic Party 1853–1855, delegate to the Democratic National Convention 1856 1860 1876, U.S. Collector of Customs of New York City 1857–1861, chairman of the Democratic National Committee 1872, candidate for New York State Senate 1877, candidate for Mayor of New York City 1878. Brother of Richard Schell.

== Schencks and Tellers ==
- Abraham Schenck (1775–1831), New York Assemblyman 1804–1806, U.S. Representative from New York 1815–1817. Uncle of Isaac Teller.
  - Isaac Teller (1799–1868), U.S. Representative from New York 1854–1855. Nephew of Abraham Schenck.

== Schleichers and Stockdales ==
- Gustav Schleicher (1823–1879), Texas state representative 1953–1954, Texas state senator 1959–1961, U.S. Representative from Texas 1975–1979. Father-in-law of Fletcher Stockdale.
  - Fletcher Stockdale (1823–1890), Texas state senator 1857–1861, delegate to the Texas Democratic Convention 1859 1860, Lieutenant Governor of Texas 1863–1865, Governor of Texas 1865. Son-in-law of Gustav Schleicher.

== Schmitzes ==
- John G. Schmitz (1930–2001), California state senator 1964–1970 1978–1982, U.S. Representative from California 1970–1973, candidate for President of the United States 1972, candidate for Republican nomination for U.S. Representative from California 1976. Father of Joseph E. Schmitz.
  - Joseph E. Schmitz, Inspector General of the U.S. Defense Department 2002–2005. Son of John G. Schmitz.

== Schoonmakers ==
- Cornelius C. Schoonmaker (1745–1796), New York Assemblyman 1777–1790, U.S. Representative from New York 1791–1793. Grandfather of Marius Schoomaker.
  - Marius Schoonmaker (1811–1894), New York state senator 1850–1851, U.S. Representative from New York 1851–1853, president of the Kingston, New York Board of Education 1854–1856; president of Kingston, New York 1866 1869–1870; delegate to the New York Constitutional Convention 1867. Grandson of Cornelius C. Schoonmaker.

== Schreibers ==
- Martin E. Schreiber (1904–1997), candidate for Milwaukee, Wisconsin Alderman 1940; candidate for Wisconsin Assembly 1940; Wisconsin Assemblyman 1942–1944; Milwaukee, Wisconsin Alderman 1944–1976. Father of Martin J. Schreiber.
  - Martin J. Schreiber (born 1939), Wisconsin state senator 1963–1971, Lieutenant Governor of Wisconsin 1971–1977, Governor of Wisconsin 1977–1979, candidate for the Democratic nomination for Governor of Wisconsin 1982. Son of Martin E. Schreiber.

== Schuylers ==
- Pieter Schuyler (1657–1724), first mayor of Albany, New York.
- Johannes Schuyler (1668–1747), Mayor of Albany, New York 1703–1706. Father of Johannes Schuyler.
  - Johannes Schuyler (1697–1746), Mayor of Albany, New York 1741–1742. Son of Johannes Schuyler.
    - Philip Schuyler, United States Senator from New York
      - Alexander Hamilton, United States Secretary of the Treasury, son-in-law of Philip Schuyler.
      - Philip Jeremiah Schuyler, United States Congressman from New York, son of Philip Schuyler.
        - William S. Hamilton (1797–1850), Illinois state representative 1824, Wisconsin Territory Assemblyman 1842–1843, candidate for delegate to U.S. Congress from Wisconsin Territory 1843, candidate for delegate to Wisconsin Constitutional Convention 1848, U.S. Deputy Surveyor of Public Lands. Son of Alexander Hamilton.
          - Schuyler Colfax, Vice President of the United States, grandson of Philip Schuyler's cousin Hester Schuyler.
            - Sidney Breese (1800–1878), a descendant of Alida Schuyler (sister of Johannes Schuyler (1668–1747)). Appointed by President John Quincy Adams as United States Attorney for the State of Illinois 1827, Justice in the Illinois Supreme Court 1841, Democrat United States Senator from Illinois 1843–1849, Speaker of the Illinois House of Representatives 1850–1852, Justice of Supreme Court of Illinois 1841–1843, 1857–1878
            - Elias Kane (1794–1835), descendant of David Pieterse Schuyler. First Illinois Secretary of State and one of Illinois' first United States Senators 1825–1835. Kane County, Illinois is named in his honor

See the Livingston family for other Schuyler political descendants from Alida Schuyler and her husband Robert Livingston the Elder, including the Bush Family, Hamilton Fish and his descendants, and John Kean (New Jersey) and his descendants, among others.

== Schwabe ==
- George B. Schwabe (1886–1952), Mayor of Nowata, Oklahoma 1913–1814; Oklahoma state representative 1918–1922; U.S. Representative from Oklahoma 1945–1948 1951–1952. Brother of Max Schwabe.
- Max Schwabe (1905–1983), U.S. Representative from Missouri 1943–1949. Brother of George B. Schwabe.

== Schwegmanns ==
- John G. Schwegmann (1911–1995), member of the Louisiana House of Representatives 1960–1968, Louisiana state senator 1968–1972, member of the Louisiana Public Service Commission 1975–1980, grocery magnate in Metairie in Jefferson Parish, father of John F. Schwegmann and father-in-law of Melinda B. Schwegmann
  - John F. Schwegmann (born 1945), member of the Louisiana Public Service Commission (1981–1996), son of John G. Schwegmann and husband of Melinda B. Schwegmann
  - Melinda B. Schwegmann (born 1946), first female Lieutenant Governor of Louisiana 1992–1996, member of the Louisiana House 1997–2004, wife of John F. Schwegmann, daughter-in-law of John G. Schwegmann

== Schweinhauts ==
- Henry Albert Schweinhaut (1902–1970), Judge of the United States District Court for the District of Columbia 1944–1956.
- Margaret Schweinhaut (1903–1997), Maryland State Delegate 1955–1961, Maryland State Senator 1961–1963 1967–1991. Wife of Henry Albert Schweinhaut.

== Schwellenbachs ==
- Edgar W. Schwellenbach (1887–1957), Justice of the Washington Supreme Court 1946–1957.
- Lewis B. Schwellenbach (1894–1948), U.S. Senator from Washington 1935–1940, Judge of the United States District Court for the Eastern District of Washington 1940–1945, United States Secretary of Labor 1945–1948. Brother of Edgar W. Schwellenbach.

== Scotts ==
- Robert Walter Scott (I), member of the North Carolina General Assembly.
  - W. Kerr Scott (1896–1958), son of Robert Walter Scott, U.S. Senator from North Carolina from 1954 to 1958. He also served as the Governor of North Carolina from 1949 to 1953.
  - Mary White Scott (1897–1972), First Lady of North Carolina 1949–1953, wife of W. Kerr Scott
  - Ralph Scott, brother of W. Kerr Scott, member of the North Carolina General Assembly.
    - Robert W. "Bob" Scott (1929–2009), the son of W. Kerr Scott and nephew of Ralph, he served as Lieutenant Governor of North Carolina from 1965 to 1969 and as the state's Governor from 1969 to 1973. He unsuccessfully ran for a new term as governor in 1980, and later spent many years as the president of the North Carolina Community College System.
    - Jessie Rae Scott (1929–2010), Second Lady of North Carolina 1965–1969, First Lady of North Carolina (1969–1973). Wife of Bob Scott
      - Meg Scott Phipps (born 1956), the daughter of Bob Scott and Jessie Rae Scott and granddaughter of W. Kerr Scott, she was elected North Carolina Commissioner of Agriculture in 2000. In 2003 she was convicted of perjury, obstruction of justice, and other crimes. She subsequently resigned as commissioner and spent three years in prison before being released in April 2007.
    - Amy Scott Galey (born 1967), the daughter of Sam Scott granddaughter of Samuel F. Scott, was elected to the Alamance County board of commissioners in 2016, serving as chair.

== Scotts and the Provostys of Louisiana ==
- Albin Provosty (1865–1932), member of the Louisiana State Senate, brother of Olivier Provosty, grandfather of Nauman Scott and great-grandfather of Jock Scott
- Olivier Provosty, Chief Justice of the Louisiana Supreme Court 1920–1922, brother of Albin Provosty, great-uncle of Nauman Scott and great-great-uncle of Jock Scott
  - Nauman Scott (1916–2001), judge of the United States District Court for the Western District of Louisiana, based in Alexandria 1970–2001, ordered cross-parish busing to foster school desegregation, grandson of Albin Provosty, great-nephew of Olivier Provosty, father of Jock Scott
    - Jock Scott (1947–2009), member of the Louisiana House of Representatives 1976–1988, lawyer and historian, two-time unsuccessful candidate for the United States House of Representatives, son of Nauman Scott, great-grandson of Albin Provosty, great-great-nephew of Olivier Provosty

== Scotts of Maryland and Pennsylvania ==
- Gustavus Scott (1753–1800), delegate to the Maryland Constitutional Convention 1776, Maryland House Delegate 1780, delegate to the Continental Congress from Maryland 1784. Grandfather of William Lawrence Scott.
  - William Lawrence Scott (1828–1891), Mayor of Erie, Pennsylvania 1866 1871; Democratic National Committeeman; Delegate to the Democratic National Convention 1868 1876 1880 1888; U.S. Representative from Pennsylvania 1885–1889. Grandson of Gustavus Scott.

== Scotts of Pennsylvania and Florida ==
- John Scott (1784–1850), Pennsylvania state representative 1819–1820, U.S. Representative from Pennsylvania 1829–1831. Father of John Scott and George W. Scott.
  - John Scott (1824–1896), Pennsylvania state representative 1862, U.S. Senator from Pennsylvania 1869–1875. Son of John Scott.
  - George W. Scott, candidate for Governor of Florida 1868. Son of John Scott.

== Scrantons ==
See The Scranton family

== Scudders ==
- Henry Joel Scudder (1825–1886), U.S. Representative from New York 1873–1875. Uncle of Townsend Scudder.
  - Townsend Scudder (1865–1960), U.S. Representative from New York 1899–1901 1903–1905, Justice of the New York Supreme Court 1907–1920 1927–1936. Nephew of Henry Joel Scudder.

== Seavers ==
- Ebenezer Seaver (1763–1844), Massachusetts state representative 1794–1802 1822 1823 1826, U.S. Representative from Massachusetts 1803–1813, delegate to the Massachusetts Constitutional Convention 1820. Third cousin once removed of James Warren Sever.
  - James Warren Sever (1797–1871), Massachusetts state representative 1853 1856. Third cousin once removed of Ebenezer Seaver.
    - Benjamin Seaver (1795–1856), Massachusetts state representative 1846–1848, Massachusetts state senator 1850–1851, Mayor of Boston, Massachusetts 1852–1853. Third cousin twice removed of Ebenezer Seaver.

== Seelyes ==
- Julius Hawley Seelye (1824–1895), U.S. Representative from Massachusetts 1875–1877. Great-grandfather of Talcott Williams Seelye.
  - Talcott Williams Seelye (1922–2006), U.S. Ambassador to Tunisia 1972–1976, U.S. Ambassador to Syria 1977–1981. Great-grandson of Julius Hawley Seelye.

== Seiberlings ==
- Francis Seiberling (1870–1945), U.S. Representative from Ohio 1929–1933. Cousin of John F. Seiberling.
- John F. Seiberling (1918–2008), U.S. Representative from Ohio 1971–1987. Cousin of Francis Seiberling.

== Seitzes ==
- Collins J. Seitz (1914–1998), Judge of the United States Court of Appeals for the Third Circuit 1966–1989, Presiding Judge of the United States Foreign Intelligence Surveillance Court of Review 1987–1994.
  - Virginia A. Seitz (born 1956), United States Assistant Attorney General for Legal Counsel 2011–2013. Daughter of Collins J. Seitz.
  - Collins J. Seitz Jr. (born 1957), Associate Justice of the Delaware Supreme Court 2015–2019, Chief Justice of the Delaware Supreme Court 2019–present. Son of Collins J. Seitz.

== Semples ==
- James Semple (1798–1866), Illinois state representative 1828–1833, Attorney General of Illinois 1833–1834, U.S. Chargé d'Affaires to New Granada 1837–1842, Justice of the Illinois Supreme Court 1843, U.S. Senator from Illinois 1843–1847. Father of Eugene Semple.
  - Eugene Semple (1840–1908), Governor of Washington Territory 1887–1889, candidate for Governor of Washington 1889. Son of James Semple.

== Sensenbrenners ==
- F. James Sensenbrenner Jr. (born 1943), Wisconsin Assemblyman 1969–1975, Wisconsin state senator 1975–1979, U.S. Representative from Wisconsin 1979–2021. Cousin of F. Joseph Sensenbrenner.
- F. Joseph Sensenbrenner Jr. (born 1948), Mayor of Madison, Wisconsin 1983–1989. Cousin of F. James Sensenbrenner Jr.

NOTE: F. James "Jim" Sensenbrenner is the paternal great-grandson of James C. Kerwin, who served as a justice of the Wisconsin Supreme Court from 1905-1921. Jim Sensenbrenner is also the son-in-law of Robert W. Warren, who served in the Wisconsin Senate from 1965-1969, the Attorney General of Wisconsin from 1969-1974, a Judge of the U.S. District Court for the Eastern District of Wisconsin from 1974-1991, a Senior Judge on that court from 1991-1998, and a Judge of the U.S. Foreign Intelligence Surveillance Court of Review from 1989-1996.

== Serranos ==
- José Serrano (born 1943), New York Assemblyman 1974–1990, U.S. Representative from New York 1990–2021. Father of José M. Serrano.
  - José M. Serrano (born 1972), New York City Councilman 2001–2004, New York state senator 2005–present. Son of José Serrano.

== Sessions ==
- William S. Sessions (1930–2020), U.S. Attorney in Texas 1971–1974, U.S. District Judge in Texas 1974–1987. Father of Peter A. Sessions.
  - Peter A. Sessions (born 1955), candidate for U.S. Representative from Texas 1991 1993, U.S. Representative from Texas 1997–2019, 2021–present. Son of William S. Sessions.

== Sevarios ==
- Joe Sevario (born 1944), Democratic member of the Louisiana State Senate for five parishes about Baton Rouge, including his own Ascension Parish, 1976–1994; unsuccessful candidate in 1986 for Louisiana's 8th congressional district, since disbanded, father of Shawn Kirk Sevario
  - Shawn Kirk Sevario (born 1967, Independent member of the Ascension Parish School Board since 2014, son of Joe Sevario.

== Sewalls ==
- Samuel Sewall (1652–1730), Chief Justice of Massachusetts. Great-grandfather of Samuel Sewall.
  - Samuel Sewall (1757–1840), U.S. Representative from Massachusetts 1797–1800, Judge of Massachusetts Supreme Court 1800–1814. Great-grandson of Samuel Sewall.

== Sewalls of Maine and New Jersey ==
- Arthur Sewall (1835–1900), delegate to the Democratic National Convention 1876, Democratic National Committeeman 1888–1896, candidate for Vice President of the United States 1896. Father of Harold M. Sewall.
  - Harold M. Sewall (1860–1924), Maine state representative 1896 1903–1907, delegate to the Republican National Convention 1896 1916, U.S. Minister to the Hawaiian Islands 1897–1898, Maine state senator 1907–1909, candidate for U.S. Representative from Maine 1914, Republican National Committeeman 1924. Son of Arthur Sewall.
    - Sumner Sewall (1897–1965), Governor of Maine 1941–1945, delegate to the Republican National Convention 1944. Grandson of Arthur Sewall.
    - Walter E. Edge (1873–1956), New Jersey Assemblyman 1910, New Jersey state senator 1911–1916, Governor of New Jersey 1917–1919 1944–1947, U.S. Senator from New Jersey 1919–1929, delegate to the Republican National Convention 1920 1924 1928 1932 1936 1940 1944 1948 1952 1956, U.S. Ambassador to France 1929–1933, candidate for the Republican nomination for Vice President of the United States 1936. Son-in-law of Harold M. Sewall.

== Sewards and Millers ==
- Elijah Miller (1772–1861), judge. Father-in-law of William H. Seward.
- Samuel S. Seward (1768–1849), judge, member of the New York State Assembly 1804. Father of William H. Seward.
  - William H. Seward (1801–1872), Governor of New York 1839–1842, U.S. Senator from New York 1849–1861, U.S. Secretary of State 1861–1869. Son-in-law of Elijah Miller.
    - Frederick W. Seward (1830–1915), U.S. Assistant Secretary of State 1861–1869 1877–1879. Son of William H. Seward.

== Sewells ==
- John Sewell (1867–1938), Mayor of Miami, Florida 1903–1907. Brother of E. George Sewell.
- E. George Sewell (1875–1940), Mayor of Miami, Florida 1927–1929 1933–1935 1939–1940. Brother of John Sewell.

== Seymours ==
- Thomas Seymour (1735–1829), Mayor of Hartford, Connecticut 1774–1812; Connecticut state representative 1789–1812; County Judge in Connecticut 1798–1803. Grandfather of Thomas H. Seymour.
  - Thomas H. Seymour (1807–1868), Probate Court Judge in Connecticut 1836–1838, U.S. Representative from Connecticut 1843–1845, Governor of Connecticut 1850–1853, U.S. Minister to Russia 1853–1858, candidate for Governor of Connecticut 1863, candidate for the Democratic nomination for President of the United States 1864. Grandson of Thomas Seymour.

== Seymours and Conklings ==
- Horatio Seymour 1778–1857, U.S. Senator from Vermont 1821–1833.
- Henry Seymour 1780–1837, New York state senator 1815–1919 1821–1822. Brother of US Senator Horatio Seymour.
  - Origen S. Seymour 1804–1881, Connecticut state representative 1842 1849–1850 1880, U.S. Representative from Connecticut 1851–1855, Judge in Connecticut 1855–1863, candidate for Governor of Connecticut 1864 1865, Justice of the Connecticut Supreme Court 1870–1874, Chief Justice of the Connecticut Supreme Court 1873–1874. Nephew of Gov. Horatio Seymour and Henry Seymour.
  - Horatio Seymour 1810–1886, New York Assemblyman 1842 and 1844–1846, Mayor of Utica, New York 1843; candidate for Governor of New York 1850; Governor of New York 1853–1854 1863–1864; candidate for the Democratic nomination for President of the United States 1860; delegate to the Democratic National Convention 1864; candidate for President of the United States 1868; Presidential Elector for New York 1876. Son of Henry Seymour.
  - Horatio Seymour (1813–1872), New York assemblyman 1862 and 1863; surrogate of Erie County 1868–1872. Son of US Senator Horatio Seymour.
    - Edward W. Seymour 1832–1892, Connecticut state senator 1876, U.S. Representative from Connecticut 1873–1877. Son of Origen Storrs Seymour.
    - Horatio Seymour Jr., New York State Engineer 1878–1881. Nephew of Gov. Horatio Seymour.
- Alfred Conkling 1789–1874, U.S. Representative from New York 1821–1823, Judge of U.S. District Court of Northern District of New York 1825–1852, U.S. Minister to Mexico 1852–1853.
  - Frederick A. Conkling 1816–1891, U.S. Representative from New York 1861–1863. Son of Alfred Conkling.
  - Roscoe Conkling 1829–1888, Mayor of Utica, New York 1858–1859; U.S. Representative from New York 1859–1863 1865–1867; U.S. Senator from New York 1867 1869–1881; candidate for the Republican nomination for President of the United States 1876; delegate to the Republican National Convention 1880. Son of Alfred Conkling, brother-in-law of Horatio Seymour.
  - Alfred Conkling Coxe 1847–1923, Judge of U.S. District Court of Northern District of New York 1882, Judge of U.S. Court of Appeals 1902–1917. Grandson of Alfred Conkling.

== Shaheens ==
- Jeanne Shaheen, New Hampshire state senator 1990-96, Governor of New Hampshire 1997-2003, U.S. Senator from New Hampshire 2009-present
  - Stefany Shaheen, U.S. Representative-elect from New Hampshire. Daughter of Jeanne Shaheen

== Shannons ==
- George Shannon (1785–1836), Kentucky state representative 1820–1824, Circuit Court Judge in Kentucky, U.S. District Attorney in Missouri 1829. Brother of Thomas Shannon, James Shannon, and Wilson Shannon.
  - George R. Shannon (1818–1891), Texas state senator 1870–1872. Son of George Shannon.
- Thomas Shannon (1786–1843), Ohio state representative 1819–1822 1824–1825, U.S. Representative from Ohio 1826–1827, Ohio state senator 1829 1837–1841. Brother of George Shannon, James Shannon, and Wilson Shannon.
- James Shannon (1791–1832), U.S. Chargé d'Affaires to Central America 1832. Brother of George Shannon, Thomas Shannon, and Wilson Shannon.
- Wilson Shannon (1802–1877), candidate for U.S. Representative from Ohio 1832, Governor of Ohio 1838–1840 1842–1844, U.S. Minister to Mexico 1844–1845, U.S. Representative from Ohio 1853–1855, Governor of Kansas Territory 1855–1856. Brother of George Shannon, Thomas Shannon, and James Shannon.
  - Isaac C. Parker (1838–1896) Circuit Court Judge in Missouri 1868–1870, U.S. Representative from Missouri 1871–1875, Judge of U.S. District Court in Arkansas 1875. Grandnephew of George Shannon, Thomas Shannon, James Shannon, and Wilson Shannon.

NOTE: James Shannon was also son-in-law of Kentucky Governor Isaac Shelby. David Shannon 1793-1823 General Andrew Jackson's private secretary. Territorial Governor of Florida

== Shaws ==
- Samuel Shaw (1768–1827), Vermont state representative 1800–1807, U.S. Representative from Vermont 1808–1813. Father of Henry Shaw.
  - Henry Shaw (1788–1857), U.S. Representative from Massachusetts 1817–1821, Massachusetts state representative 1824–1830 1833, Massachusetts state senator 1835, candidate for Governor of Massachusetts 1845, member of the New York City Board of Education 1849, New York City Common Councilman 1850–1851, New York Assemblyman 1853. Son of Samuel Shaw.

== Sheffields ==
- William Paine Sheffield (1820–1907), delegate to the Rhode Island Constitutional Convention 1841 1842, Rhode Island state representative 1842–1845 1849–1853 1857–1861 1875–1884, U.S. Representative from Rhode Island 1861–1863, U.S. Senator from Rhode Island 1884–1885. Father of William Paine Sheffield.
  - William Paine Sheffield (1857–1919), Rhode Island state representative 1885–1887 1889 1890 1894–1896 1899–1901, U.S. Representative from Rhode Island 1909–1911, candidate for U.S. Representative from Rhode Island 1912, Republican National Committeeman 1913. Son of William Paine Sheffield.

== Sheffields and Tods ==
- David Tod (1805–1868), candidate for Governor of Ohio 1844 1846, U.S. Minister to Brazil 1847–1851, delegate to the Democratic National Convention 1860, Governor of Ohio 1862–1864. Grandfather-in-law of James R. Sheffield.
  - James R. Sheffield (1864–1938), New York Assemblyman 1904, delegate to the Republican National Convention 1916 1920 1924 1936, U.S. Ambassador to Mexico 1924–1927. Great grandson-in-law of David Tod.

== Sheldons ==
- Lawson Sheldon (1827–1905), delegate to the Nebraska Constitutional Convention 1864. Father of George L. Sheldon.
  - George L. Sheldon (1870–1960), Governor of Nebraska 1907–1909, candidate for Republican nomination for Vice President of the United States 1908, delegate to the Republican National Convention 1908. Son of Lawson Sheldon.
    - Anson H. Sheldon, Mississippi Republican Committeeman 1944–1967, chairman of the Mississippi Republican Party 1948–1952, vice chairman of the Republican National Committee 1952–1967, delegate to the Republican National Convention 1956 1960. Son of George Sheldon.

== Shelleys ==
- John Shelley (1905–1974), California state senator 1938–1946, candidate for Lieutenant Governor of California 1946, delegate to the Democratic National Convention 1948, U.S. Representative from California 1949–1964, Mayor of San Francisco, California 1964–1968. Father of Kevin Shelley.
  - Kevin Shelley (born 1955), member of the San Francisco, California Board of Supervisors; California Assemblyman 1996–2002; delegate to the Democratic National Convention 2000 2004; California Secretary of State 2003–2005. Son of John Shelley.

== Shepleys ==
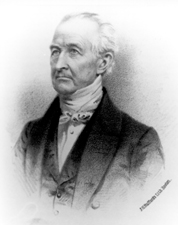
Ether Sheply

- Ether Shepley (1789–1877), member of the Massachusetts General Court 1819, delegate to the Maine Constitutional Convention 1820, U.S. Attorney of Maine 1821–1833, U.S. Senator from Maine 1833–1836, Justice of the Maine Supreme Court 1836–1848, Chief Justice of the Maine Supreme Court 1848–1855. Father of George F. Shepley.
  - George F. Shepley (1819–1878), Mayor of New Orleans, Louisiana 1862; Governor of Louisiana 1862–1864; Governor of Richmond, Virginia 1865. Son of Ether Shepley.

== Sheppards and Macks ==
- John Levi Sheppard (1852–1902), U.S. Representative from Texas, 1899–1902.
  - Morris Sheppard (1875–1941), U.S. Representative from Texas, 1902–1913; U.S. Senator from Texas, 1913–1941; son of John Levi Sheppard.
    - Richard S. Arnold (1936–2004), Judge of the United States District Court for the Eastern District of Arkansas and the United States District Court for the Western District of Arkansas, 1978–1980; Judge of the United States Court of Appeals for the Eighth Circuit, 1980–2001; grandson of Morris Sheppard.
    - Morris S. Arnold (born 1941), Judge of the United States District Court for the Western District of Arkansas, 1985–1992; Judge of the United States Court of Appeals for the Eighth Circuit, 1992–2006; grandson of Morris Sheppard, brother of Richard S. Arnold.
    - Connie Mack III (born 1940), U.S. Representative from Florida, 1983–1989; senator from Florida 1989–2001; grandson of Morris Sheppard.
      - Connie Mack IV (born 1967), U.S. Representative from Florida, 2005–2013; son of Connie Mack III.
      - Mary Bono Mack (born 1961), U.S. Representative from California 1998–2013. Wife of Connie Mack IV.

NOTE: Connie Mack III is also step-grandson of U.S. Senator Tom T. Connally, who was the father of federal judge Ben Clarkson Connally. Mary Bono Mack is also widow of U.S. Representative Sonny Bono.

== Sheppards and Wallaces ==
- William H. Wallace, South Carolina state representative, Circuit Court Judge in South Carolina. Father-in-law of John Calhoun Sheppard.
  - John Calhoun Sheppard (1850–1931), delegate to the Democratic National Convention 1876, South Carolina state representative, Governor of South Carolina 1886. Son-in-law of William H. Wallace.

== Shermans ==
- Richard U. Sherman (1819–1895), New York Assemblyman 1857 1875–1876, delegate to the 1867 New York Constitutional Convention, Secretary of the New York Fish and Game Commission 1879–1890. Father of Richard W. Sherman and James S. Sherman.
  - Richard W. Sherman, Mayor of Utica, New York. Son of Richard U. Sherman.
  - James S. Sherman (1855–1912), U.S. Representative from New York 1887-1891 1893-1909, Vice President of the United States 1909–1912. Son of Richard U. Sherman.
- Stuart Sherman (1965–present), Birmingham, Michigan mayor 2009, 2015.

== Shermans of Ohio ==
- Charles Robert Sherman (1788–1829), Justice of the Ohio Supreme Court 1823–1829. Father of Charles Taylor Sherman, William Tecumseh Sherman, John Sherman, and Hoyt Sherman.
  - Charles Taylor Sherman (1811–1879), Judge of U.S. District Court in Ohio 1867–1872. Son of Charles Robert Taylor.
  - William Tecumseh Sherman (1820–1891), U.S. Secretary of War 1869. Son of Charles Robert Sherman.
  - John Sherman (1823–1900), delegate to the Whig Party National Convention 1848 1852, U.S. Representative from Ohio 1855–1861, U.S. Senator from Ohio 1861–1877 1881–1897, U.S. Secretary of the Treasury 1877–1881, candidate for Republican nomination for President of the United States 1881, U.S. Secretary of State 1897–1898. Son of Charles Robert Sherman.
  - Hoyt Sherman (1827–1904), Postmaster of Des Moines, Iowa 1849–1850; Clerk of the Iowa District Court; Iowa Assemblyman 1866. Son of Charles Robert Sherman.
  - Thomas W. Bartley (1812–1885), Ohio State Representative 1829–1831, Ohio State Senator 1841–1845, Governor of Ohio 1844, Justice of the Ohio Supreme Court 1852–1859. Son-in-law of Charles Robert Sherman.
    - J. Donald Cameron (1813–1918), U.S. Secretary of War 1876–1877, U.S. Senator from Pennsylvania 1877–1897, chairman of the Republican National Committee 1879–1880. Son-in-law of Charles Taylor Sherman.
    - Nelson A. Miles (1839–1925), Governor of Puerto Rico 1898. Son-in-law of Hoyt Sherman.

NOTE: J. Donald Cameron was also son of U.S. Secretary of War Simon Cameron. William Tecumseh Sherman was also adoptive son of U.S. Secretary of the Interior Thomas Ewing. Thomas W. Bartley was also son of Ohio Governor Mordecai Bartley.

== Shields ==
- James Shields (1762–1831), Ohio state representative 1806–1827, U.S. Representative from Ohio 1829–1831. Uncle of James Shields.
- James Shields (1806–1879), Illinois state representative, Justice of the Illinois Supreme Court, U.S. Senator from Illinois 1849–1855, U.S. Senator from Minnesota 1858–1859, U.S. Senator from Missouri 1879. Nephew of James Shields.

== Shippens ==
- Edward Shippen (1639–1712), second mayor of Philadelphia, Chief Justice of the Supreme Court of Pennsylvania, 1699. Grandfather of William Shippen and Edward Shippen, III.
  - Joseph Shippen
    - Edward Shippen, III (1703–1781), mayor of Philadelphia, judge of the Pennsylvania Courts of Common Pleas, prothonotary, founder of Shippensburg, Pennsylvania
      - Edward Shippen, IV (1729–1806), member of the Pennsylvania Provincial Council, Chief Justice of the Supreme Court of Pennsylvania 1799–1804
        - Peggy Shippen (1760–1804), loyalist and second wife of Benedict Arnold
    - William Shippen (1712–1801), delegate to the Second Continental Congress
      - William Shippen Jr. (1736–1808), second Surgeon General of the Continental Army

== Shiras ==
- George Shiras Jr. (1832–1924), Justice of the U.S. Supreme Court 1892–1903. Father of George Shiras III.
  - George Shiras III (1859–1942), Pennsylvania state representative 1889–1890, candidate for Republican nomination for U.S. Representative from Pennsylvania 1890, U.S. Representative from Pennsylvania 1903–1905. Son of George Shiras Jr.

== Shobers ==
- Francis Edwin Shober (1831–1896), member of the North Carolina House of Commons 1862 1864, North Carolina state senator 1865 1887, U.S. Representative from North Carolina 1869–1873, delegate to the North Carolina Constitutional Convention 1875, Judge of Rowan County, North Carolina 1877–1878; delegate to the Democratic National Convention 1880 1884. Father of Francis Emanuel Shober.
  - Francis Emanuel Shober (1860–1919), U.S. Representative from New York 1903–1905. Son of Francis Edwin Shober.

== Shonks ==
- George W. Shonk (1850–1900), U.S. Representative from Pennsylvania 1891–1893. Father of Herbert B. Shonk.
  - Herbert B. Shonk (1881–1930), New York Assemblyman 1923–1930. Son of George W. Shonk.

NOTE: Herbert B. Shonk was also son-in-law of Buffalo, New York Mayor Erastus C. Knight.

== Shotts ==
- Hugh Shott (1866–1953), Postmaster of Bluefield, West Virginia 1903–1912; U.S. Representative from West Virginia 1929–1933; candidate for U.S. Senate from West Virginia 1936; U.S. Senator from West Virginia 1942–1943. Father of Hugh Shott Jr. and James H. Shott.
  - Hugh Shott Jr., delegate to the Republican National Convention 1952 1972. Son of Hugh Shott.
  - James H. Shott, chairman of the West Virginia Republican Party 1944–1948. Son of Hugh Shott.
    - John C. Shott (born 1926), West Virginia Republican Executive Committeeman 1957–1967, chairman of the West Virginia Republican Party 1965–1967. Son of James H. Shott.

== Sholes of Wisconsin ==
- Charles Sholes (1816–1867), member of the Wisconsin State Assembly 1855, Wisconsin State Senate 1866–1867, Mayor of Kenosha, Wisconsin. Brother of Christopher Sholes.
- Christopher Sholes (1819–1890), inventor of the typewriter, Wisconsin State Senate 1848–1849, 1856–1857, Wisconsin Assembly, 1852–1853. Brother of Charles Sholes.

== Shoups ==
- George Laird Shoup (1836–1904), Idaho Territory Representative 1874, Idaho Territory Councilman 1878, Republican National Committeeman 1880–1904, Governor of Idaho Territory 1889–1890, Governor of Idaho 1890, U.S. Senator from Idaho 1890–1901. Great-grandfather of Richard G. Shoup.
  - Richard G. Shoup (1923–1995), Missoula, Montana Alderman 1963–1967; Mayor of Missoula, Montana 1967–1970; U.S. Representative from Montana 1971–1975. Great-grandson of George Laird Shoup.

Jack Shoup (1990–present), [Orange County, California] Mayor of Salina, Kansas (1991)

== Shrivers ==
- David Shriver, a delegate of the Maryland state legislature in 1776.
  - (Robert) Sargent Shriver Jr., Peace Corps director, director of the war on poverty, U.S. Ambassador to France 1968–1970, Democratic vice-presidential candidate in 1972 and Democratic presidential candidate in 1976. A descendant of David Shriver. Married Eunice Kennedy.
    - Maria Shriver, television journalist, is married to Arnold Schwarzenegger, Governor of California. Daughter of Sargent Shriver.
    - Mark Kennedy Shriver, Maryland state legislature; ran unsuccessfully for the U.S. House in 2002. Son of Sargent Shriver.
    - Robert Sargent Shriver III, City Councilmember of Santa Monica, California since 2004. Son of Sargent Shriver.

== Shunks and Browns ==
- William Findlay (1768–1846), Pennsylvania state representative 1797, treasurer of Pennsylvania 1807–1817, Governor of Pennsylvania 1817–1820, U.S. Senator from Pennsylvania 1821–1827. Father-in-law of Francis R. Shunk.
  - Francis R. Shunk (1788–1848), Secretary of Pennsylvania 1839–1842, Governor of Pennsylvania 1845–1848. Son-in-law of William Findlay.
    - Henry Chapman (1804–1891), Pennsylvania state senator, 1843, U.S. representative, 1857–1859, judge, son-in-law of Francis R. Shunk (by daughter Nancy).
    - Charles Brown (1797–1883), Pennsylvania state representative 1830–1833, delegate to the Pennsylvania Constitutional Convention 1834, Pennsylvania state senator 1838–1841, U.S. Representative from Pennsylvania 1841–1843 1847–1849. Son-in-law of Francis R. Shunk (by daughter Elizabeth).
      - Francis Shunk Brown, Attorney General of Pennsylvania 1915–1919, delegate to the Republican National Convention 1924 1928. Son of Charles Brown.
        - Francis Shunk Brown Jr., Common Pleas Court Judge in Pennsylvania 1927–1939. Son of Francis Shunk Brown.

NOTE: William Findlay was also brother of U.S. Representatives John Findlay and James Findlay and grandfather of U.S. Representative John Van Lear Findlay.

== Shusters ==
- Elmer G. Shuster (1932–2023), U.S. Representative from Pennsylvania 1972–2001. Father of William Shuster.
  - William Shuster (born 1961), U.S. Representative from Pennsylvania 2001–2019. Son of Elmer G. Shuster.

== Sibleys and Trowbridges ==
- Solomon Sibley (1769–1846), member of the Northwest Territory Legislature, U.S. Attorney of Michigan Territory 1815–1823, U.S. Congressional Delegate from Michigan Territory 1820–1823, Justice of the Michigan Territory Supreme Court 1824–1827, Chief Justice of the Michigan Territory Supreme Court 1827–1837. Father of Henry Hastings Sibley.
  - Henry Hastings Sibley (1811–1891), Justice of the Peace in Iowa Territory, U.S. Congressional Delegate from the Wisconsin Territory 1848–1849, member of the Minnesota Territory Legislature 1855, delegate to the Minnesota Constitutional Convention 1857, Governor of Minnesota 1858–1860. Son of Solomon Sibley.
  - Charles Christopher Trowbridge, Mayor of Detroit, Michigan 1834; candidate for Governor of Michigan 1837. Son-in-law of Solomon Sibley.

NOTE: Henry Hastings Sibley was also son-in-law of Pennsylvania state representative James Steele and brother-in-law of U.S. Representative James Leeper Johnson.

== Silbermans ==
- Laurence Silberman, (1935–2022), United States Under Secretary of Labor 1970–1973, United States Deputy Attorney General 1974–1975, United States Ambassador to Yugoslavia 1975–1976, Judge of the United States Court of Appeals for the District of Columbia Circuit 1985–2000, Judge of the United States Foreign Intelligence Surveillance Court of Review 1996–2003, Chair of the Iraq Intelligence Commission 2004–2005.
  - Robert S. Silberman (born 1957), Assistant Secretary of the Army (Manpower and Reserve Affairs) 1992–1993. Son of Laurence Silberman.

== Sillers ==
- Walter Sillers (1852–1931), Member of the Mississippi House of Representatives, Chairman of the Mississippi Levee Board of Commissioners. Husband of Florence Warfield Sillers and father of Walter Sillers Jr. and Florence Sillers Ogden.
- Florence Warfield Sillers (1869–1958), socialite and historian. Wife of Walter Sillers and mother of Walter Sillers Jr. and Florence Sillers Ogden.
  - Walter Sillers Jr. (1888–1966), 56th Speaker of the Mississippi House of Representatives, delegate to the Democratic National Convention. Son of Walter Sillers and Florence Warfield Sillers.
  - Florence Sillers Ogden (1891–1971), conservative political activist, political columnist, segregationist. Daughter of Walter Sillers and Florence Warfield Sillers.

== Silvesters ==
- Peter Silvester (1734–1808), Albany, New York Common Councilman 1772; New York Colony Representative 1774–1775; Judge of Court of Common Pleas of Columbia County, New York; U.S. Representative from New York 1789–1793; New York Assemblyman 1788 1803–1806; New York state senator 1796–1800. Grandfather of Peter H. Silvester.
  - Peter H. Silvester (1807–1882), U.S. Representative from New York 1847–1851. Grandson of Peter Silvester.

== Simms ==
- John F. Simms (1885–1954), Justice of the New Mexico Supreme Court 1929–1931. Father of John F. Simms.
  - John F. Simms (1916–1975), Governor of New Mexico 1955–1957. Son of John F. Simms.

== Simmons and Urners ==
- Milton Urner (1839–1926), Maryland State Attorney 1871–1875, U.S. Representative from Maryland 1879–1883, Maryland state senator 1888–1890. Uncle of James S. Simmons.
  - James S. Simmons (1861–1935), chairman of the Niagara Falls, New York Republican Committee 1907–1908; U.S. Representative from New York 1909–1913; delegate to the Republican National Convention 1912. Nephew of Milton Urner.

== Simons ==
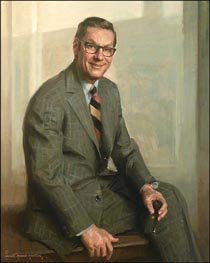
Hanging portrait of William Simon

- William E. Simon (1927–2000), Deputy U.S. Secretary of the Treasury 1973–1974, U.S. Secretary of the Treasury 1974–1977, chairman of the East-West Foreign Trade Board 1975–1977. Father of William Simon Jr..
  - William Simon Jr. (born 1951), candidate for Governor of California 2002, candidate for Republican nomination for Governor of California 2003, withdrew nomination. Son of William E. Simon.

== Simons of Illinois ==
- Paul Simon (1928–2003), Illinois state representative 1955–1963, Illinois state senator 1963–1968, Lieutenant Governor of Illinois 1969–1973, U.S. Representative from Illinois 1975–1985, U.S. Senator from Illinois, 1985–1997. Husband of Jeanne Hurley Simon, father of Sheila Simon.
- Jeanne Hurley Simon (1923–2000), Illinois state representative 1957–1961. Wife of Paul Simon, mother of Sheila Simon
  - Sheila Simon (born 1961), Carbondale, Illinois city council member 2003–2007, Lieutenant Governor of Illinois 2011–2015. Daughter of Paul and Jeanne Simon.

== Simpsons ==
- Milward L. Simpson (1897–1993), Wyoming state representative 1926–1927, Governor of Wyoming 1955–1959, U.S. Senator from Wyoming 1962–1967. Father of Alan K. Simpson.
  - Peter K. Simpson (born 1930), Emeritus Vice President for University Advancement, Distinguished Simpson Professor of Political Science (University of Wyoming, Laramie, Wyoming). Wyoming state representative 1980–1984. Son of Milward L. Simpson.
  - Alan K. Simpson (1931-2025), Attorney of Cody, Wyoming; Wyoming state representative 1964–1977; U.S. Senator from Wyoming 1979–1997. Son of Milward L. Simpson.
    - Colin M. Simpson (born 1959), Attorney of Cody, Wyoming; Wyoming state representative 1998–2011 (Speaker of the House, 2009–2010). Son of Alan K. Simpson.
    - Milward A. Simpson (born 1962), director of the Wyoming government Department of State Parks and Cultural Resources 2006–present. Son of Peter K. Simpson.

== Simpsons of Illinois ==
- S. Elmer Simpson, Illinois Republican Committeeman 1919. Father of Sidney E. Simpson.
  - Sidney E. Simpson (1894–1958), U.S. Representative from Illinois 1943–1958, chairman of the Greene County, Illinois Republican Party 1958. Son of S. Elmer Simpson.
  - Edna Oakes Simpson (1891–1984), U.S. Representative from Illinois 1959–1961, delegate to the Republican National Convention 1960. Wife Sidney E. Simpson.

== Sinnicksons ==
- Thomas Sinnickson (1744–1817), New Jersey Assemblyman 1777 1782 1784–1785 1787–1788, U.S. Representative from New Jersey 1789–1791 1797–1799. Uncle of Thomas Sinnickson.
  - Thomas Sinnickson (1786–1783), Judge of New Jersey Court of Errors and Appeals, New Jersey Assemblyman, Judge of Court of Common Pleas in New Jersey, U.S. Representative from New Jersey 1828–1829. Nephew of Thomas Sinnickson.
    - Clement Hall Sinnickson (1834–1919), U.S. Representative from New Jersey 1875–1879, delegate to the Republican National Convention 1880, Judge of Court of Common Pleas in New Jersey. Grandnephew of Thomas Sinnickson.

== Skinners ==
- Thomas Gregory Skinner (1842–1907), U.S. Representative from North Carolina 1883–1887 1889–1891, delegate to the Democratic National Convention 1892 1904, North Carolina state senator 1899–1900. Brother of Harry Skinner.
- Harry Skinner (1855–1929), chairman of the Democratic Executive Committee in North Carolina 1880–1890, chairman of the Pitt County, North Carolina Democratic Committee 1880–1892; North Carolina state representative 1891–1892; chairman of the Pitt County, North Carolina Populist Party Committee 1892–1896; North Carolina Populist Party Committeeman 1892–1896; U.S. Representative from North Carolina 1895–1899; U.S. District Attorney in North Carolina 1902–1910. Brother of Thomas Gregory Skinner.

== Slaters ==
- James H. Slater (1826–1899), District Court Clerk of Benton County, Oregon 1853–1856; Oregon Territory Representative 1857–1858; Oregon state representative 1859–1860; Postmaster of Corvallis, Oregon 1859–1860; district attorney in Oregon 1868; U.S. Representative from Oregon 1871–1873; U.S. Senator from Oregon 1879–1885. Father of Woodson T. Slater.
  - Woodson T. Slater (1858–1928), Justice of the Oregon Supreme Court 1909–1911. Son of James H. Slater.

== Slays ==
- Francis R. Slay, Missouri state representative. Father of Francis G. Slay.
  - Francis G. Slay (born 1955), St. Louis, Missouri Alderman; Mayor of St. Louis, Missouri 2001–2017; delegate to the Democratic National Convention 2004 2008. Son of Francis R. Slay.

== Slemps ==
- Campbell Slemp (1839–1907), Virginia House Delegate 1879–1882, candidate for Lieutenant Governor of Virginia 1889, U.S. Representative from Virginia 1903–1907. Father of C. Bascom Slemp.
  - C. Bascom Slemp (1870–1943), chairman of the Virginia Republican Committee 1905–1918, U.S. Representative from Virginia 1907–1923, Republican National Committeeman. Son of Campbell Slemp.

== Slidells and Emmets ==
- John Slidell (1793–1871), candidate for U.S. Representative from Louisiana 1828, U.S. Attorney in Louisiana 1829–1833, member of the Louisiana Legislature, candidate for U.S. Senate from Louisiana 1836 1838 1848, U.S. Representative from Louisiana 1843–1845, U.S. Senator from Louisiana 1853–1861, Confederate States Envoy to France 1861. Brother of Thomas Slidell.
- Thomas Slidell, U.S. Attorney in Louisiana 1837–1838, Chief Justice of the Louisiana Supreme Court. Brother of John Slidell.
  - William C. Emmet (1836–1901), U.S. Consul in Smyrna, Anatolia 1885–1893; U.S. Consul in Aix-la-Chapelle, France 1893–1897. Grandnephew by marriage of John Slidell.

NOTE: William C. Emmet was also grandson of New York Attorney General Thomas Addis Emmet and first cousin once removed of U.S. Minister Greenville T. Emmet.

== Sloans ==
- A. Scott Sloan (1820–1895), Wisconsin Assemblyman 1857, Mayor of Beaver Dam, Wisconsin 1857–1858 1879; Wisconsin Circuit Court Judge 1858–1861 1882–1895; U.S. Representative from Wisconsin 1861–1863; Judge of Dodge County, Wisconsin 1868–1874; Attorney General of Wisconsin 1874–1878. Brother of Ithamar Sloan.
- Ithamar Sloan (1822–1898), district attorney of Rock County, Wisconsin 1858–1862; U.S. Representative from Wisconsin 1863–1867. Brother of A. Scott Sloan.
  - Henry Clay Sloan, City Attorney of Appleton, Wisconsin; Wisconsin State Assemblyman; City Attorney of Superior, Wisconsin; president of the board of education of Superior, Wisconsin; district attorney 1895–1899. Son of A. Scott Sloan.

== Smatherses ==
- William Howell Smathers; U.S. Senator from New Jersey (1937–1943); brother of Frank Smathers.
- Frank Smathers; New Jersey state court judge; brother of William Smathers and father of George Smathers.
  - George Smathers; assistant U.S. Attorney (1940–1942); U.S. Representative from Florida (1947 to 1951); U.S. Senator from Florida (1951 to 1969); candidate for the Democratic presidential nomination in 1960; son of Frank Smathers and father of Bruce Smathers.
    - Bruce Smathers; assistant State Attorney in Florida; Florida state senator; Secretary of State of Florida (1975–1978); candidate for Governor of Florida; son of George Smathers.

== Smiths ==
- Samuel Smith (1752–1839), Maryland House Delegate 1790–1792, U.S. Representative from Maryland 1793–1803 1816–1822, U.S. Senator from Maryland 1803–1815 1822–1833, Mayor of Baltimore, Maryland 1835–1838. Brother of Robert Smith.
- Robert Smith (1757–1842), Maryland Presidential Elector 1789, Maryland state senator 1793–1795, Maryland House Delegate 1796–1800, U.S. Secretary of the Navy 1801–1809, Attorney General of the United States 1805, U.S. Secretary of State 1809–1811. Brother of Samuel Smith.

== Smiths of Connecticut ==
- Nathaniel Smith (1762–1822), Connecticut state representative, U.S. Representative from Connecticut 1795–1799, Connecticut state senator 1800–1805, Justice of the Connecticut Supreme Court. Brother of Nathan Smith.
- Nathan Smith (1770–1835), delegate to the Connecticut Constitutional Convention 1818, candidate for Governor of Connecticut 1825, U.S. Attorney of Connecticut 1828–1829, U.S. Representative from Connecticut 1833–1835. Brother of Nathaniel Smith.
  - Truman Smith (1791–1884), U.S. Representative from Connecticut 1839–1843 1845–1849, U.S. Senator from Connecticut 1849–1854. Nephew of Nathaniel Smith and Nathan Smith.

== Smiths of Louisiana ==
- Dorothy Garrett Smith (1932–1990), first woman president of the Louisiana Board of Elementary and Secondary Education, 1989 to 1990; member of the Webster Parish School Board, 1970–1987, based in Springhill; wife of Gerald B. Smith
- Gerald B. Smith, contractor in Springhill, Louisiana; member of the Webster Parish Police Jury prior to 1984, widower of Dorothy Garrett Smith

== Smiths of Maine ==
- Clyde H. Smith (1876–1940), Maine State Representative 1899-1903 1919–1923, Maine Senator 1923–1929, U.S. Representative from Maine 1937–1940.
- Margaret Chase Smith (1897–1995), U.S. Representative from Maine 1940–1949, U.S. Senator from Maine 1949–1973. Wife of Clyde H. Smith.

NOTE: Margaret Chase Smith was also descended from the Chase family.

== Smiths of Michigan ==
- Nick Smith (born 1934), member of the Somerset Township, Michigan Board of Trustees 1962–1968; member of the Hillsdale County, Michigan Board of Supervisors 1966–1968; Michigan state representative 1979–1982; Michigan state senator 1983–1993; U.S. Representative from Michigan 1993–2005. Father of Brad Smith.
  - Brad Smith, candidate for Democratic nominations for U.S. Representative from Michigan 2004. Son of Nick Smith.

== Smiths of New Hampshire and Illinois ==
- Jeremiah Smith (1759–1842), New Hampshire state representative 1788–1791, Governor of New Hampshire 1809–1810. Brother of Samuel Smith.
- Samuel Smith (1765–1842), U.S. Representative from New Hampshire 1813–1815. Brother of Jeremiah Smith.
  - Robert Smith (1802–1867), Illinois state representative 1836–1840, U.S. Representative from Illinois 1843–1849 1857–1859. Nephew of Jeremiah Smith and Samuel Smith.

== Smiths of Oregon ==
- Milan Smith (born 1942), U.S. Circuit Court Judge in Oregon 2006–present. Brother of Gordon Smith.
- Gordon Smith (born 1952), Oregon state senator 1992–1997, candidate for Republican nomination for U.S. Senate from Oregon 1996, U.S. Senator from Oregon 1997–2009. Brother of Milan Smith.

Note: Milan and Gordon Smith are also related to the Udall family.

== Smiths of Oregon (II) ==
- Elmo Smith (1909–1968), mayor, Ontario. Oregon state senator, 1948–1956. Governor of Oregon, 1956–1957. Republican candidate for Oregon governor, 1956. Republican candidate for U.S. Senate, 1960. Chair, Oregon Republican Party. Father of Denny Smith.
  - Denny Smith (born 1938), U.S. Representative from Oregon, 1981–1991. Republican candidate for Oregon governor, 1994. Son of Elmo Smith.
  - Steve Symms (1938–2024), U.S. Representative from Idaho, 1973–1981, U.S. Senator from Idaho 1981–1993. Cousin of Denny Smith.

== Smiths of Vermont ==
- John Smith (1789–1858), State's Attorney of Franklin County, Vermont 1826–1832; Vermont House of Representatives 1827–1837; Speaker, 1831–1833; U.S. Representative from Vermont 1839–1841. Father of Worthington Curtis Smith and J. Gregory Smith. Great-great-grandfather of William Scranton.
  - Worthington Curtis Smith (1823–1894), Vermont state representative 1863, Vermont State Senate 1864–1865, U.S. Representative from Vermont 1867–1873. Son of John Smith. Great-grandfather of William Scranton.
  - J. Gregory Smith (1818–1891), Vermont House of Representatives 1860–1863; Speaker 1862–1863; Governor of Vermont 1863–1865, delegate to the Republican National Convention 1872, 1880, 1884. Father of Edward Curtis Smith. Son-in-law of Lawrence Brainerd. Brother-in-law of F. Stewart Stranahan.
    - Edward Curtis Smith (1854–1925), Governor of Vermont 1898–1900. Son of J. Gregory Smith. Son-in-law of Amaziah Bailey James.

== Smiths of Vermont (II) ==
- Levi P. Smith Vermont state senator, lawyer, and banker. Father of Frederick Plympton Smith.
  - Frederick Plympton Smith, Vermont state senator, lawyer, and banker. Father of Peter Plympton Smith and Charles Plympton Smith.
    - Peter Plympton Smith (born 1945), Vermont state senator 1981–1982, Lieutenant Governor of Vermont 1983–1986, candidate for Governor of Vermont 1986, U.S. Representative from Vermont 1989–1991. Son of Frederick Plympton Smith.
    - Charles Plympton Smith (born 1954), Vermont state representative 1975–1978. Son of Frederick Plympton Smith.

== Smiths of West Virginia ==
- Joseph L. Smith (1880–1962), Mayor of Beckley, West Virginia 1904–1909; West Virginia state senator 1909–1912; U.S. Representative from West Virginia 1929–1945; chairman of the West Virginia Democratic Party 1944–1947. Father of Hulett C. Smith.
  - Hulett C. Smith (1918–2012), chairman of the West Virginia Democratic Party 1956–1962, Governor of West Virginia 1965–1969, Democratic National Committeeman 1969, delegate to the Democratic National Convention 1972 2000. Son of Joseph L. Smith.

== Smiths and Symms ==
- Elmo Smith (1909–1968), Mayor of Ontario, Oregon 1940–1943 1945–1948; Oregon state senator 1949–1956; Governor of Oregon 1956–1957. Father of Dennis A. Smith.
  - Dennis A. Smith (born 1938), U.S. Representative from Oregon 1981–1991. Son of Elmo Smith.
  - Steven D. Symms (born 1938), U.S. Representative from Idaho 1973–1981, U.S. Senator from Idaho 1981–1993. Cousin of Dennis A. Smith.

== Smoots ==
- Joseph Rowlett, Kentucky state representative 1838–1850. Uncle of Abraham O. Smoot.
  - Abraham O. Smoot (1815–1895), Mayor of Salt Lake City, Utah 1857–1866; Mayor of Provo, Utah 1868–1881. Nephew of Joseph Rowlett.
    - Abraham Owen Smoot (1856–1911), Utah state senator. Son of Abraham O. Smoot.
    - Reed Smoot (1862–1941), U.S. Senator from Utah 1903–1933, delegate to the Republican National Convention 1908 1912 1920 1924 1928 1932, Republican National Committeeman 1912–1920. Son of Abraham O. Smoot.
      - A.O. Smoot (1879–1937), Mayor of Provo, Utah 1934–1935. Son of Abraham Owen Smoot.
      - Isaac Albert Smoot, Utah state representative 1928–1932. Son of Abraham Owen Smoot.

NOTE: Joseph Rowlett was also brother of Texas Republic politician Daniel Rowlett.

== Snapps ==
- Henry Snapp (1822–1895), Illinois state senator 1869–1871, U.S. Representative from Illinois 1871–1873. Father of Howard M. Snapp.
  - Howard M. Snapp (1855–1938), Master in Chancery of Will County, Illinois 1894–1903; delegate to the Republican National Convention 1896 1908; U.S. Representative from Illinois 1903–1911. Son of Henry Snapp.

== Sneeds ==
- Joseph Tyree Sneed III (1920–2008), United States Deputy Attorney General 1973, Judge of the United States Court of Appeals for the Ninth Circuit 1973–1987.
  - Carly Fiorina (born 1954), candidate for United States Senator 2010 and the Republican presidential nomination 2016. Daughter of Joseph Tyree Sneed III.

== Snellings ==
- Richard A. Snelling (1927–1991), Vermont state representative 1959–1960 1973–1976, delegate to the Republican National Convention 1960 1968 1980, chairman of the Chittenden County, Vermont 1963–1966; Vermont Republican Executive Committeeman 1963–1966; candidate for Lieutenant Governor of Vermont 1964; candidate for Governor of Vermont 1966; Governor of Vermont 1977–1985 1991; candidate for U.S. Senate from Vermont 1986. Husband of Barbara W. Snelling.
- Charles D. Snelling (born 1931), former president of the City Council of Allentown; delegate to the Republican National Convention; former chairman of the Republican Finance Committee of Pennsylvania; and serves on the Pennsylvania Republican State Committee. Brother of Richard A. Snelling. Son of Walter Oathman Snelling.
- Barbara W. Snelling (1928–2015), Lieutenant Governor of Vermont 1992–1997, Vermont state senator 1999–2002. Wife of Richard A. Snelling.
  - Mark Snelling (born 1950), treasurer of the Vermont Republican Party (2011–2014); candidate for Republican nomination for Lieutenant Governor of Vermont (2010). Son of Richard A. Snelling and Barbara W. Snelling.
  - Diane B. Snelling (born 1952), member of the Hinesburg, Vermont School Board 1985–1991; Vermont state senator 2002–2016. Daughter of Richard A. Snelling and Barbara W. Snelling.

== Snodgrass ==
- Henry C. Snodgrass (1848–1931), Attorney General in Tennessee 1878–1884, U.S. Representative from Tennessee 1891–1895, delegate to the Democratic National Convention 1896. Uncle of Charles Edward Snodgrass.
  - Charles Edward Snodgrass (1866–1936), U.S. Representative from Tennessee 1899–1903, Circuit Court Judge in Tennessee, Judge of the Tennessee Court of Appeals 1925–1934. Nephew of Henry C. Snodgrass.

== Snowes ==
- Peter Snowe (1943–1973), Maine State Representative 1967–1973. First husband of Olympia Snowe.
- Olympia Snowe (born 1947), Maine State Representative 1973–1977, Maine State Senator 1977–1979, U.S. Representative from Maine 1979–1995, U.S. Senator from Maine 1995–2013. Wife of Peter Snowe and later John R. McKernan Jr.
- John R. McKernan Jr. (born 1948), Maine State Representative 1973–1977, U.S. Representative from Maine 1983–1987, Governor of Maine 1987–1995. Second husband of Olympia Snowe.

== South, Cockrells, and Hargises ==
See South-Cockrell-Hargis Family

== Southards ==
- Henry Southard (1747–1842), Justice of the Peace in New Jersey 1787–1792, New Jersey Assemblyman 1797–1799 1811, U.S. Representative from New Jersey 1801–1811 1815–1821. Father of Isaac Southard and Samuel L. Southard.
  - Isaac Southard (1783–1853), Justice of the Peace in New Jersey, Clerk of Somerset County, New Jersey 1820–1830; U.S. Representative from New Jersey 1831–1833; Treasurer of New Jersey 1837–1843. Son of Henry Southard.
  - Samuel L. Southard (1787–1842), New Jersey Assemblyman 1815, Justice of the New Jersey Supreme Court 1815–1820, Presidential Elector for New Jersey 1820, U.S. Senator from New Jersey 1821–1823 1833–1842, U.S. Secretary of the Navy 1823–1829, Attorney General of New Jersey 1829–1833, Governor of New Jersey 1832–1833. Son of Henry Southard.

== Southgates ==
- Richard Southgate, Commonwealth Attorney of Campbell County, Kentucky; Kentucky state representative 1803; Kentucky state senator 1817–1821. Father of William Wright Southgate.
  - William Wright Southgate (1800–1849), Kentucky state representative 1827 1832 1836, U.S. Representative from Kentucky 1837–1839. Son of Richard Southgate.

== Spaights and Donnells ==
- Richard Dobbs Spaight (1758–1802), member of the North Carolina House of Commons 1779–1783 1795–1797, North Carolina Assemblyman 1781–1783, delegate to the Continental Congress from North Carolina 1783–1785, Governor of North Carolina 1792–1795, U.S. Representative from North Carolina 1798–1801, North Carolina state senator 1801–1802. Father of Richard Dobbs Spaight Jr.
  - Richard Dobbs Spaight Jr. (1796–1850), member of the North Carolina House of Commons 1819, North Carolina state senator 1820–1822 1825–1835, U.S. Representative from North Carolina 1823–1825, candidate for Governor of North Carolina 1827 1828 1830 1831 1832, Governor of North Carolina 1835–1836, delegate to the North Carolina Democratic Convention 1835. Son of Richard Dobbs Spaight.
    - Richard Spaight Donnell (1820–1867), U.S. Representative from North Carolina 1847–1849, member of the North Carolina House of Commons 1862–1864, delegate to the North Carolina Constitutional Convention 1865. Grandson of Richard Dobbs Spaight.

== Spauldings ==
- Huntley N. Spaulding (1869–1955), Governor of New Hampshire 1927–1929, delegate to the 1928 1932 1936 1940 1944. Brother of Rolland Spaulding.
- Rolland Spaulding (1873–1942), delegate to the Republican National Convention 1912, Governor of New Hampshire 1915–1917. Brother of Huntley N. Spaulding.

== Spauldings and Swegles ==
- John Swegles Jr. (1819–1861), Auditor General of Michigan 1851–1854. Father-in-law of Oliver Lyman Spaulding.
  - Oliver Lyman Spaulding (1833–1922), Michigan Secretary of State 1867–1870, U.S. Representative from Michigan 1881–1883. Son-in-law of John Swegles Jr.

== Specters ==
- Arlen Specter (1930–2012), district attorney of Philadelphia, Pennsylvania 1966–1974; candidate for Mayor of Philadelphia, Pennsylvania 1967; delegate to the Republican National Convention 1972; U.S. Senator from Pennsylvania 1981–2011. Husband of Joan Specter.
- Joan Specter, Philadelphia, Pennsylvania Councilwoman. Wife of Arlen Specter.
  - Tracey Specter, delegate to the Republican National Convention 2000. Daughter-in-law of Arlen Specter and Joan Specter.

== Speeds and Adams ==
- Thomas Adams (1730–1788), Clerk of Henrico County, Virginia; member of the Virginia House of Burgesses; delegate to the Continental Congress from Virginia 1778–1779; Virginia state senator 1783–1786. Great granduncle of James Speed.
  - James Speed (1812–1887), Kentucky state representative 1847, Louisville, Kentucky Alderman 1851–1854; Kentucky state senator 1861–1864; U.S. Attorney General 1864–1866; candidate for U.S. Senate from Kentucky 1867; candidate for the Republican nomination for Vice President of the United States 1868; candidate for U.S. House of Representatives from Kentucky 1870; delegate to the Republican National Convention 1872. Great grandnephew of Thomas Adams.

== Spences ==
- John S. Spence (1788–1840), Maryland House Delegate, Maryland state senator, U.S. Representative from Maryland 1823–1825 1831–1833, U.S. Senator from Maryland 1836–1840. Uncle of Thomas Ara Spence.
  - Thomas Ara Spence (1810–1877), U.S. Representative from Maryland 1843–1845, Circuit Court Judge in Maryland. Nephew of John S. Spence.

== Spencers ==
- Ambrose Spencer (1765–1848), City Clerk of Hudson, New York 1786–1793, New York Assemblyman 1793–1795, New York state senator 1795–1804, Assistant Attorney General of New York 1796, Attorney General of New York 1802–1804, Justice of the New York Supreme Court 1804–1819, Chief Justice of the New York Supreme Court 1819–1823, U.S. Representative from New York 1829–1831, Mayor of Albany, New York 1824–1826; president of the Whig National Convention 1844. Father of John C. Spencer.
  - John C. Spencer (1788–1855), Postmaster of Canandaigua, New York 1814; Assistant Attorney General 1815; U.S. Representative from New York 1817–1819; candidate for U.S. Senate from New York 1818; New York Assemblyman 1820–1822; New York state senator 1824–1828; U.S. Secretary of War 1841–1843; U.S. Secretary of the Treasury 1843–1844. Son of Ambrose Spencer.

NOTE: Ambrose Spencer was also brother-in-law of U.S. Senator De Witt Clinton.

== Spooners ==
- John Coit Spooner (1843–1919), Wisconsin Assemblyman 1872, U.S. Senator from Wisconsin 1885–1891 1897–1907, delegate to the Republican National Convention 1888 1891, Governor of Wisconsin 1892. Brother of Philip L. Spooner Jr.
- Philip L. Spooner Jr. (1847–1918), Mayor of Madison, Wisconsin 1880–1881. Brother of John Coit Spooner.

== Spragues (Massachusetts) ==
- Peleg Sprague (1793–1880), Massachusetts state representative 1821–1822, U.S. Representative from Massachusetts 1825–1829, U.S. Senator from Massachusetts 1829–1835, U.S. District Court Judge of Massachusetts 1841–1865. Grandfather of Charles F. Sprague.
  - Charles F. Sprague (1857–1902), Boston, Massachusetts Common Councilman 1889–1890; Massachusetts state representative 1891–1892; Massachusetts state senator 1895–1896; U.S. Representative from Massachusetts 1897–1901. Grandson of Peleg Sprague.

== Spragues (Rhode Island) ==
- Amasa Sprague (1798–1843), Rhode Island state representative (1832, 1840, and 1841)
  - Amasa Sprague Jr. (1828–1902), Rhode Island state representative (1864–1865 and 1884–1885), Democratic nominee for Governor of Rhode Island (1886), sheriff of Kent County, Rhode Island (1890–1902). Son of Amasa Sprague.
  - William Sprague IV (1830–1915), United States Senator from Rhode Island (1863–1875), Governor of Rhode Island (1860–1863). Son of Amasa Sprague and son-in-law of Salmon P. Chase.
  - Thomas A. Doyle (1827–1886), Mayor of Providence, Rhode Island (1864–1869, 1870–1881, 1884–1886). Son-in-law of Amasa Sprague.
- William Sprague III (1799–1856), United States Senator from Rhode Island (1842–1844), Governor of Rhode Island (1838–1839), member of the U.S. House of Representatives (1835–1837), Speaker of the Rhode Island House of Representatives (1832–1835). Brother of Amasa Sprague.

== Sprengs ==
- Michael Spreng (1947–2022), Missouri state representative (2003–2011)
- Churie Spreng, Missouri state representative (2011–2013). Wife of Michael Spreng.

== Spriggs ==
- Michael Sprigg (1791–1845), Maryland House Delegate 1821 1823 1837 1840 1844, U.S. Representative from Maryland 1827–1831. Brother of James Sprigg.
- James Sprigg (1802–1852), Kentucky state representative 1830–1834 1837–1840 1852, U.S. Representative from Kentucky 1841–1843. Brother of Michael Sprigg.

== Staeblers ==
- Edward W. Staebler (1872–1946), Mayor of Ann Arbor, Michigan 1927–1931; candidate for Michigan state representative 1932. Father of Neil Staebler.
  - Neil Staebler (1905–2000), chairman of the Michigan Democratic Party 1950–1961, delegate to the Democratic National Convention 1952 1956 1960 1964 1968, U.S. Representative from Michigan 1963–1965, Democratic National Committeeman 1963–1967 1972–1975, candidate for Governor of Michigan 1964. Son of Edward W. Staebler.

== Staggers ==
- Harley Orrin Staggers (1907–1991), Sheriff of Mineral County, West Virginia 1937–1941; U.S. Representative from West Virginia 1949–1981. Father of Harley O. Staggers Jr.
  - Harley O. Staggers Jr. (born 1951), West Virginia state senator 1980–1982, U.S. Representative from West Virginia 1983–1993. Son of Harley Orrin Staggers.
  - Margaret Anne Staggers (born 1945), delegate to the 1976 Democratic National Convention; West Virginia House Delegate 2007–2014. Daughter of Harley Orrin Staggers.

== Stanfords ==
- Charles Stanford (1819–1885), New York Assemblyman 1864–1865, New York state senator 1866–1869. Brother of Leland Stanford.
- Leland Stanford (1824–1893), candidate for Governor of California 1859, Governor of California 1862–1863, U.S. Senator from California 1885–1893. Brother of Charles Stanford.

== Stanfords and Webbs ==
- Richard Stanford (1767–1816), U.S. Representative from North Carolina 1797–1816. Grandfather of William R. Webb.
  - William R. Webb (1842–1926), U.S. Senator from Tennessee 1913. Grandson of Richard Stanford.

== Stanlys ==
- John Stanly (1774–1834), member of the North Carolina House of Commons 1798–1799 1812–1815 1818–1819 1823–1825, U.S. Representative from North Carolina 1801–1803 1809–1811. Father of Edward Stanly.
  - Edward Stanly (1810–1872), U.S. Representative from North Carolina 1837–1843 1849–1853, North Carolina state representative 1844–1846 1848–1849, candidate for Governor of California 1857, governor in North Carolina 1862–1863. Son of John Stanly.

== Stapletons ==
- Benjamin F. Stapleton (1869–1950), Mayor of Denver 1923–1931 and 1935–1947. Grandfather of Craig Roberts Stapleton.
  - Craig Roberts Stapleton (born 1945), United States Ambassador to the Czech Republic 2001–2004, United States Ambassador to France 2005–2009. Grandson of Benjamin F. Stapleton, father of Walker Stapleton.
    - Walker Stapleton (born 1974), Colorado State Treasurer 2011–2019. Son of Craig Roberts Stapleton.

Note: Walker Stapleton is related to the Bush–Davis–Walker family political line.

== Starkweathers ==
- George A. Starkweather (1794–1879), U.S. Representative from New York 1847–1849. Uncle of George Anson Starkweather.
  - George Anson Starkweather (1826–1907), member of the Michigan Legislature. Nephew of George A. Starkweather.
  - George A. Starkweather (1821–1904), Auditor of Wayne County, Pennsylvania; Clerk of South Canaan Township, Pennsylvania; Justice of the Peace in Pennsylvania. Third cousin once removed of George A. Starkweather.

== Starrs ==
- Charles Starr (born 1933), Member of the Oregon House of Representatives 1993–1999, Member of the Oregon State Senate 1999–2007
  - Bruce Starr (born 1969), Member of the Oregon House of Representatives 1999–2003, Member of the Oregon State Senate 2003–2015. Son of Charles Starr.

== Stassens ==
- Harold Stassen (1907–2001), Governor of Minnesota 1939–1943, district attorney of Dakota County, Minnesota 1931–1939, director of United States Foreign Operations Administration 1953–1955, president of the University of Pennsylvania 1948–1953, candidate for President of the United States at Republican Convention 1944, 1948, 1952, 1964, 1968, 1980, 1984, 1988, 1992, candidate for Governor of Minnesota 1982, candidate for United States Senate 1978 and 1994, candidate for Governor of Pennsylvania 1958 and 1966, candidate for Mayor of Philadelphia 1959, candidate for Congress 1986. Uncle of J. Robert Stassen
  - J. Robert Stassen (1927–2015), Member of Minnesota State Senate 1973–1976, Member of Metropolitan Airports Commission from 1981. Nephew of Harold Stassen

== Steagalls ==
- William Collinsworth Steagall, Alabama state senator. Father of Henry B. Steagall.
  - Henry B. Steagall (1873–1943), Alabama state representative 1906–1907, U.S. Representative from Alabama 1915–1943, delegate to the Democratic National Convention 1940. Son of William Collinsworth Steagall.

== Steelmans ==
- Dorman L. Steelman former state representative and as chairman of the Missouri Republican Party.
  - David Steelman, former state representative and Missouri Assistant Attorney General.
  - Sarah Steelman (born 1958), State Treasurer of Missouri and former candidate for governor.

== Stephens ==
- Alexander H. Stephens (1812–1883), Georgia state representative 1836–1841, Georgia state senator 1842, U.S. Representative from Georgia 1843–1859 1873–1882, delegate to the Confederate States Provisional Congress from Georgia 1861–1862, Vice President of the Confederate States 1861–1865, candidate for U.S. Senate from Georgia 1872, Governor of Georgia 1882–1883. Brother of Linton Stephens.
- Linton Stephens (1823–1872), Georgia state representative 1849 1863, Georgia state senator 1853–1855, candidate for U.S. Representative from Georgia 1855 1857, Justice of the Georgia Supreme Court 1859–1860. Brother of Alexander H. Stephens.
  - Robert G. Stephens Jr. (1913–2003), Attorney of Athens, Georgia 1947–1950; Georgia state senator 1951–1953; Georgia state representative 1953–1959; delegate to the Democratic National Convention 1964; U.S. Representative from Georgia 1961–1977. Great-grandnephew of Alexander H. Stephens.

== Stephens of California ==
- Albert Lee Stephens Sr. (1874–1965), Associate Justice of the California Court of Appeal, Second District, Division Two 1932–1935, Judge of the United States District Court for the Southern District of California 1935–1937, Judge of the United States Court of Appeals for the Ninth Circuit 1937–1961.
  - Albert Lee Stephens Jr. (1913–2001), Judge of the United States District Court for the Southern District of California 1961–1966, Judge of the United States District Court for the Central District of California 1966–1979. Son of Albert Lee Stephens Sr.

== Stephensons ==
- Isaac Stephenson (1829–1918), Wisconsin Assemblyman 1866 1868, U.S. Representative from Wisconsin 1883–1889, U.S. Senator from Wisconsin 1907–1915. Brother of Samuel M. Stephenson.
- Samuel M. Stephenson (1831–1907), chairman of the board of Menominee County, Michigan; Michigan state representative 1877–1878; Michigan state senator 1879–1880 1885–1886; delegate to the Republican National Convention 1884 1888; U.S. Representative from Michigan 1889–1897. Brother of Isaac Stephenson.

== Stepoviches ==
- Michael Anthony Stepovich (1919–2014), Alaska Territory Representative 1951–1953, Alaska Territory Senator 1953–1957, Governor of Alaska Territory 1957–1958, candidate for U.S. Senate from Alaska 1958, candidate for Governor of Alaska 1962 1966, delegate to the Republican National Convention 1964. Father of Nick Stepovich.
  - Nick Stepovich (born 1957), Alaska state representative 2003–2005. Son of Michael Anthony Stepovich.

== Sterlings ==
- Thomas Sterling (1851–1930), district attorney of Spink County, South Dakota 1886–1888; U.S. Senator from South Dakota 1913–1925. Brother of John A. Sterling.
- John A. Sterling (1857–1918), Illinois State Attorney of McLean County, Illinois 1892–1896; U.S. Representative from Illinois 1903–1913 1915–1918. Brother of Thomas Sterling.

== Sterlings of Connecticut and New York ==
- Ansel Sterling (1782–1853), Connecticut state representative 1815 1818–1821 1825–1826 1829 1835–1837, U.S. Representative from Connecticut 1821–1825, Chief Justice of the Litchfield, Connecticut Court of Common Pleas 1838–1840. Brother of Micah Sterling.
- Micah Sterling (1784–1844), Treasurer of Watertown, New York 1816; U.S. Representative from New York 1821–1823; New York state senator 1836–1839. Brother of Ansel Sterling.

== Stetsons and Wilsons ==
- Charles Stetson (1801–1883), Judge of the Bangor, Maine Municipal Court 1834–1839; Bangor, Maine Councilman 1843–1844; Maine Executive Councilman 1845–1848; U.S. Representative from Maine 1849–1851. Brother of Isiah Stetson.
- Isiah Stetson (1812–1880), Mayor of Bangor, Maine 1859–1862. Brother of Charles Stetson.
  - Charles S. Wilson (1873–1947), U.S. Minister to Bulgaria 1921–1928, U.S. Minister to Romania 1928–1933, U.S. Minister to Yugoslavia 1933. Grandson of Charles Stetson.

== The Steubes ==
- Brad Steube, Sheriff of Manatee County, Florida. Father of Greg Steube.
  - Greg Steube (born 1978), Florida State Representative 2010–2016, Florida State Senator 2016–2018, U.S. Representative from Florida 2019–present. Son of Brad Steube.

== Stevens ==
- Theodore F. Stevens (1923–2010), U.S. Attorney for Alaska Territory 1954–1956, candidate for U.S. Senate from Alaska 1962, delegate to the Republican National Convention 1964, chair of the Alaska delegation to the Republican National Convention 1972, Alaska state representative 1964–1968, candidate for Republican nomination for U.S. Senate from Alaska 1968, U.S. Senator from Alaska 1968–2009, President pro tempore of U.S. Senate 2003-2007. Father of Benjamin A. Stevens.
  - Benjamin A. Stevens (1959–2022), Alaska state senator 2001–2007, Republican National Committeeman 2004–2008, delegate to the Republican National Convention 2008. Son of Theodore F. Stevens.

== Stevens of Massachusetts and Washington ==
- Charles A. Stevens (1816–1892), Massachusetts state representative 1853, delegate to the Republican National Convention 1860 1868, Massachusetts Governor's Councilman 1867–1870, U.S. Representative from Massachusetts 1874, U.S. Representative from Massachusetts 1875. Brother of Moses T. Stevens.
- Moses T. Stevens (1825–1907), Massachusetts state representative 1861, Massachusetts state senator 1868, U.S. Representative from Massachusetts 1891–1895. Brother of Charles A. Stevens.
- Isaac Stevens (1818–1862), Governor of Washington Territory 1853–1857, candidate for Democratic nominations for U.S. Congressional Delegate from Washington Territory 1855, withdrew nomination; U.S. Congressional Delegate from Washington Territory 1857–1861; delegate to the Democratic National Convention 1860. Cousin of Charles A. Stevens and Moses T. Stevens.
  - Hazard Stevens (1842–1918), member of the Massachusetts Legislature, candidate for U.S. Representative from Massachusetts. Son of Isaac Stevens.

== Stevensons ==
The Stevensons of Illinois have produced a number of important political figures:

- Adlai E. Stevenson I (1835–1914), U.S. Representative from Illinois, 1875–1877 and 1879–1881; U.S. vice president under Grover Cleveland, 1893–1897
  - Lewis G. Stevenson (1868–1929), Secretary of State of Illinois, 1914–1917; son of Adlai Stevenson I
    - Adlai Stevenson II (1900–1965), Governor of Illinois, 1949–1953; Democratic nominee for president, 1952 and 1956; ambassador to the United Nations, 1961–1965; son of Lewis G. Stevenson
      - Adlai Stevenson III (1930–2021), Illinois state treasurer, U.S. Senator from Illinois, 1970–1981; Democratic Nominee for Governor of Illinois, 1982 & 1986; son of Adlai Stevenson II
- James Stevenson Ewing (1835–1918), U.S. Minister to Belgium, 1893–1897; cousin of Adlai Stevenson I
- Sydenham B. Alexander (1840–1921), U.S. Representative from North Carolina, 1891–1895, cousin of Adlai Stevenson I and James Stevenson Ewing

NOTE: James Stevenson Ewing was also son of Bloomington, Illinois Mayor John Wallis Ewing and brother of Illinois State Judge William Gillespie Ewing. Sydenham B. Alexander was also cousin of U.S. Senator John Sharp Williams.

== Stevensons of California, Idaho, and Nevada ==
- Charles C. Stevenson (1826–1890), Nevada state senator, Governor of Nevada 1887-1890. Brother of Edward A. Stevenson.
- Edward A. Stevenson (1831–1895), California Assemblyman 1854–1856 1860–1861, Idaho Territory Councilman 1866–1868 1876–1878, Governor of Idaho Territory 1885–1889, candidate for Governor of Idaho 1894. Brother of Charles C. Stevenson.

== Stewarts ==
- Andrew Stewart (1791–1872), Pennsylvania state representative 1815–1818, U.S. Attorney in Pennsylvania 1818–1820, U.S. Representative from Pennsylvania 1821-1823 1823-1829 1831-1833 1833-1835 1843–1849, delegate to the Republican National Convention 1860, candidate for U.S. Representative from Pennsylvania 1870. Father of Andrew Stewart.
  - Andrew Stewart (1836–1903), candidate for U.S. Representative from Pennsylvania, U.S. Representative from Pennsylvania 1891–1892. Son of Andrew Stewart.

== Stewarts of Ohio ==
- James Garfield Stewart (1880–1959), Mayor of Cincinnati 1938–1947, Associate Justice of the Ohio Supreme Court 1947–1959.
  - Potter Stewart (1915–1985), Judge of the United States Court of Appeals for the Sixth Circuit 1954–1958, Associate Justice of the Supreme Court of the United States 1958–1981. Son of James Garfield Stewart.

== Stewarts of Utah ==
- Ted Stewart (born 1948), Judge of the United States District Court for the District of Utah 1999–2014.
- Chris Stewart (born 1960), U. S. Representative from Utah 2013–2023.

== Stines ==
- Dennis Stine, former Louisiana state representative and state commissioner of administration from 1988 to 1992, businessman who resides in Lake Charles, brother of Tim Stine
- Tim Stine, businessman, former Louisiana state representative, and city council member in his native Sulphur, Louisiana, brother of Dennis Stine

== Stinsons ==
- Ford E. Stinson, member of the Louisiana House of Representatives 1940 to 1948 and 1952 to 1972 from Bossier Parish, lawyer and father of Ford E. Stinson Jr.
    - Douglas Matthew Stinson (born 1982), assistant district attorney for juvenile cases for the 26th Judicial District Court in Bossier and Webster parishes, son of Ford E. Stinson Jr., and grandson of Ford E. Stinson

== Stocktons ==
- Richard Stockton (1730–1781), Justice of the New Jersey Supreme Court. Brother-in-law of Elias Boudinot.
- Elias Boudinot (1740–1821), New Jersey Colony Assemblyman, delegate to the Continental Congress from New Jersey 1778 1781–1783, U.S. Representative from New Jersey 1789–1795. Brother-in-law of Richard Stockton.
- Elisha Boudinot, Chief Justice of the New Jersey Supreme Court. Brother of Elias Boudinot.
  - Richard Stockton (1764–1828), U.S. Attorney of New Jersey 1789–1791, U.S. Senator from New Jersey 1796–1799, candidate for Governor of New Jersey 1801 1803 1804, U.S. Representative from New Jersey 1813–1815. Son of Richard Stockton.
    - Robert F. Stockton (1795–1866), Governor of California 1846–1847, U.S. Senator from New Jersey 1851–1853. Son of Richard Stockton.
    - Richard Stockton Field (1803–1870), New Jersey Assemblyman 1837, Attorney General of New Jersey 1838–1841, delegate to the New Jersey Constitutional Convention 1844, U.S. Senator from New Jersey 1862–1863, Judge of the U.S. District Court of New Jersey 1863–1870. Son of Richard Stockton.
      - John P. Stockton (1826–1900), U.S. Minister to Papal States 1858–1861, U.S. Senator from New Jersey 1865–1866 1869–1875, Attorney General of New Jersey 1877–1897. Son of Robert F. Stockton.

NOTE: Elias Boudinot was also father-in-law of U.S. Attorney General William Bradford.

== Stocktons of Delaware and Michigan ==
- Thomas Stockton (1781–1846), Governor of Delaware 1845–1846. Second cousin of John Stockton.
- John Stockton (1797–1878), Michigan Territory Councilman 1824–1831 1834–1835. Second cousin of Thomas Stockton.

== Stokes ==
- Louis Stokes (1925–2015), U.S. Representative from Ohio 1969–1999, delegate to the Democratic National Convention 1972. Brother of Carl Stokes.
- Carl Stokes (1927–1996), Ohio state representative 1962, candidate for Mayor of Cleveland, Ohio 1965; Mayor of Cleveland, Ohio 1967–1971; delegate to the Democratic National Convention 1972; Municipal Court Judge in Ohio 1983–1994; U.S. Ambassador to Seychelles 1994–1995. Brother of Louis Stokes.
  - Angela Stokes, Municipal Court Judge in Ohio. Daughter of Louis Stokes.

== Stokes and Wellborns ==
- Montfort Stokes (1762–1842), U.S. Senator from North Carolina 1816–1823, Governor of North Carolina 1830–1832. Brother-in-law of James Wellborn.
- James Wellborn (1767–1854), North Carolina state senator 1795–1811 1818–1821 1823–1824 1828–1829 1832 1834. Brother-in-law of Montfort Stokes.

== Stones ==
- William Stone (1603–1695), Governor of Maryland Colony 1649–1655. Great-great grandfather of Thomas Stone, Michael J. Stone, and John Hoskins Stone.
  - Thomas Stone (1743–1787), Maryland state senator 1779–1783, delegate to the Continental Congress from Maryland 1775–1776 1778 1784. Great-great grandson of William Stone.
  - Michael J. Stone (1747–1812), Maryland House Delegate 1781–1783, U.S. Representative from Maryland 1789–1791. Great-great grandson of William Stone.
  - John Hoskins Stone (1750–1804), Maryland Executive Councilman 1779–1785 1791–1792, Maryland House Delegate 1785–1787 1790, Governor of Maryland 1794–1797. Great-great grandson of William Stone.
    - Frederick Stone (1820–1899), Maryland House Delegate 1864–1865, U.S. Representative from Maryland 1867–1871, Judge of the Maryland Court of Appeals 1881–1890. Grandson of Michael J. Stone.
    - John Moncure Daniel (1825–1865), U.S. Chargé d'Affaires to Sardinia 1853–1854, U.S. Minister to Sardinia 1854–1861. Grandson of Thomas Stone.

== Stonemans ==
- George Stoneman (1822–1894), Governor of California 1883–1887. Brother of John Thompson Stoneman.
- John Thompson Stoneman (1931–1905), Iowa state senator 1876–1880. Brother of George Stoneman.

== Storers ==
- Bellamy Storer (1796–1875), U.S. Representative from Ohio 1835–1837, Judge of the Cincinnati, Ohio Superior Court 1854–1872. Father of Bellamy Storer.
  - Bellamy Storer (1847–1922), U.S. Attorney in Ohio 1869–1870, U.S. Representative from Ohio 1891–1895, U.S. Minister to Belgium 1897–1899, U.S. Minister to Spain 1899–1902, U.S. Minister to Austria-Hungary 1902–1906. Son of Bellamy Storer.
    - Nicholas Longworth (1869–1931), Ohio state representative 1899, Ohio state senator 1901, U.S. Representative from Ohio 1903–1913 1915–1931, Speaker of the U.S. House of Representatives 1925–1931. Nephew of Bellamy Storer.
    - Alice Roosevelt Longworth (1884–1980), delegate to the Republican National Convention 1936 1940. Wife of Nicholas Longworth.

NOTE: Alice Lee Roosevelt was also daughter to U.S. President Theodore Roosevelt, sister of Puerto Rico Governor Theodore Roosevelt Jr., and first cousin of Connecticut state representative Corinne Alsop Cole.

== Storkes ==
- Charles A. Storke (1847–1936), California Assemblyman 1883–1885 1889–1891, Mayor of Santa Barbara, California 1900–1902. Father of Thomas M. Storke.
  - Thomas M. Storke (1876–1971), Postmaster of Santa Barbara, California 1914–1921; U.S. Senator from California 1938–1939. Son of Charles A. Storke.

== Storrs ==
- Henry R. Storrs (1787–1837), U.S. Representative from New York 1817–1821 1823–1831, Judge of the Court of Common Pleas in Oneida County, New York 1825–1829. Brother of William L. Storrs.
- William L. Storrs (1795–1861), Connecticut 1827–1829 1834, U.S. Representative from Connecticut 1829–1833 1839–1840, Justice of the Connecticut Supreme Court 1840–1856, Chief Justice of the Connecticut Supreme Court 1856–1861. Brother of Henry R. Storrs.

== Storys ==
- Joseph Story (1779–1845), Massachusetts state representative 1805–1807, U.S. Representative from Massachusetts 1808–1809, Justice of the U.S. Supreme Court 1811–1845. Granduncle of Bert J. Storey.
  - Bert J. Storey (1880–1958), Michigan state representative 1939–1950, chairman of the Ionia County, Michigan Republican Party 1950; candidate for the Republican nomination for Michigan State Senate 1952; Michigan state senator 1955–1958. Grandnephew of Joseph Story.

== Stoughtons, Nelsons, and Tailers ==
- William Stoughton (1631–1701), Deputy Governor of Massachusetts Bay Colony, Chief Magistrate of Massachusetts Bay Colony, Chief Justice of the Massachusetts Bay Colony Supreme Court, acting Governor of Massachusetts Bay Colony 1694–1699 1700–1701. Uncle of William Tailer.
  - William Tailer (1676–1732), Lieutenant Governor of Massachusetts Bay Colony, acting Governor of Massachusetts Bay Colony 1715–1716 1730. Nephew of William Stoughton.
  - John Nelson (1654–1734), Lieutenant Governor of Massachusetts Bay Colony. Brother-in-law of William Tailer.

== Strattons ==
- Samuel S. Stratton (1916–1990), Schenectady, New York Councilman; Mayor of Schenectady, New York 1956–1959; U.S. Representative from New York 1959–1989. Father of Brian Stratton.
  - Brian Stratton, Mayor of Schenectady, New York. Son of Samuel S. Stratton.

== Strattons of Illinois ==
- William J. Stratton (1886–1938), Illinois Secretary of State 1929–1933, candidate for Illinois Secretary of State 1936. Father of William Stratton.
  - William Stratton (1914–2001), U.S. Representative from Illinois 1941–1943 1947–1949, Treasurer of Illinois 1843–1945 1951–1953, candidate for the Republican nomination for Illinois Secretary of States 1944, candidate for Michigan Secretary of State 1948, delegate to the Republican National Convention 1952 1956 1960, Governor of Illinois 1953–1961, candidate for the Republican nomination for Vice President of the United States 1960, candidate for the Republican nomination for Governor of Illinois 1968. Son of William J. Stratton.

== Straus ==
- Isidor Straus (1845–1912), U.S. Representative from New York 1894–1895. Brother of Oscar Straus.
  - Jesse I. Straus (1872–1936), U.S. Ambassador to France 1933–1936. Son of Isidor Straus.
    - Robert K. Straus (1905–1997), New York City Councilman 1938–1941. Grandson of Isidor Straus.
    - Stuart Scheftel (1911–1994), candidate for U.S. Representative from New York 1942. Grandson of Isidor Straus.
- Nathan Straus (1848–1931), Parks Commissioner of New York City 1889–1893, president of the Board of Health and Commissioner of the Department of Health 1898, Tammany Candidate for Mayor of New York City in 1894, United States delegate to the International Congress for Protection of Infants 1911, United States delegate to the Congress of Tuberculosis 1912. Brother of Isidor Straus and Oscar Straus.
  - Nathan Straus Jr. 1889–1961, delegate to the Democratic National Convention 1920, 1924, 1944, New York state senator 1921–1926. Nephew of Isidor Straus and Oscar Straus.
    - R. Peter Straus (1924–2012), delegate to the Democratic National Convention 1960, 1964. Director of Voice of America under Jimmy Carter. Son of Nathan Straus Jr.
- Oscar Straus (1850–1926), U.S. Minister to Ottoman Empire 1887–1889 1898–1899, U.S. Secretary of Commerce and Labor 1906–1909, U.S. Ambassador to Ottoman Empire 1909–1910, candidate for Governor of New York 1912. Brother of Isidor Straus.

NOTE: Nathan Straus Jr. was also brother-in-law of New York Supreme Court Justice Irving Lehman and U.S. Senator Herbert H. Lehman.

== Streets ==
- John F. Street (born 1943), Philadelphia, Pennsylvania Councilman 1980–1998; Mayor of Philadelphia, Pennsylvania 2000–2008; delegate to the Democratic National Convention 2000 2004 2008. Brother of Milton Street.
  - Sharif Street (born 1974), Pennsylvania State Senator 2022–present, delegate to the Democratic National Convention 2004, candidate for Philadelphia, Pennsylvania Councilman 2007. Son of John F. Street.
- Milton Street (1941–2022), Pennsylvania state representative 1979–1980, Pennsylvania state senator 1981–1984, candidate for U.S. Representative from Pennsylvania 1982, candidate for Mayor of Philadelphia, Pennsylvania 2007; candidate for the Democratic nomination for Philadelphia, Pennsylvania Councilman 2007. Brother of John F. Street.

== Strindens ==
- Earl S. Strinden (1931–2022) was born and raised in Litchville, North Dakota. In his career he served 26 years in elected office, starting with the Grand Forks city council and ending with 22 years in the North Dakota House of Representatives. For 11 of those years, Earl was House Majority Leader. This tenure makes him the longest serving House Majority Leader in North Dakota history. He was the Republican nominee for U.S. Senate in 1988 but was unsuccessful in unseating Quentin Burdick. He additionally served as president of the University of North DakotaAlumni Association from 1974 to 2000 and founded the UND Foundation. Earl and his wife of nearly 70 years, Janice, have five children, 14 grandchildren, and 8 great-grandchildren.
  - Michelle Strinden (born 1969) is married to Earl's son Tom. She currently serves in the North Dakota State House from south Fargo's 41st district. She was elected in 2018 and serves on the Appropriations Committee.
  - Thomas Beadle (born 1987) is Earl's grandson and North Dakota's current State Treasurer. He was elected in 2020 with over 65% of the vote. Prior to that role, he served in the North Dakota State House for 10 years from south Fargo's 27th district. He concluded his time in the house on the Appropriations Committee.
  - Tony Grindberg (born 1960) is married to Earl's daughter Karen, and served in the North Dakota Senate from the 41st district from 1992 to 2014. He then served on the Fargo City Commission from 2016 to 2020. He now works as Principal Manager for Xcel Energy in North Dakota.
- Theron Strinden (1919–2011) served in the U.S. Army during World War II. From 1963-1967 and 1969-1981 he served in the North Dakota State Senate and was President Pro Tempore. He was nicknamed "Senator No" by his younger brother Earl in recognition of his staunchly conservative voting record.
  - Marie Strinden is Theron's granddaughter who represented Grand Fork's 18th district in the North Dakota House from 2013 to 2016. She was only elected Democrat in a family of prominent Republicans.

== Strongs ==
- Theron R. Strong (1802–1873), district attorney of Wayne County, New York 1835–1839; U.S. Representative from New York 1839–1841; New York Assemblyman 1842; Justice of the New York Supreme Court 1851–1859; Judge of Court of Appeals in New York 1859. Cousin of William Strong.
- William Strong (1808–1895), U.S. Representative from Pennsylvania 1847–1851, Justice of the Supreme Court of Pennsylvania 1857–1868, Justice of the U.S. Supreme Court 1870–1880. Cousin of Theron R. Strong.
- Newton Deming Strong (1809–1866), member of the Illinois House of Representatives. Brother of William Strong.

== Strothers ==
- French Strother (1730–1800), Virginia lawyer, delegate to the Virginia Convention of 1776, member of the Virginia House of Delegates for fifteen years, member of the Virginia Senate for eight years, delegate to the Virginia Ratifying Convention. Father of George F. Strother.
  - George French Strother (1783–1840), member of the Virginia House of Delegates 1806–1809, U.S. Representative from Virginia 1817–1820, Receiver of Public Moneys of St. Louis, Missouri. Father of James F. Strother.
    - James F. Strother (1811–1860), member of the Virginia House of Delegates 1840–1851, delegate to the Virginia Constitutional Convention 1850, U.S. Representative from Virginia 1851–1853. Son of George Strother.
      - James F. Strother (1868–1930), Judge of McDowell County, West Virginia Criminal Court 1905–1924; U.S. Representative from West Virginia 1925–1929. Grandson of James F. Strother.

== Strubles ==
- George R. Struble (1836–1918), Judge in Iowa 1870–1872, Iowa Assemblyman. Brother of Isaac S. Struble.
- Isaac S. Struble (1843–1913), U.S. Representative from Iowa 1883–1891. Brother of George R. Struble.

== Stuarts ==
- Archibald Stuart (1795–1855), delegate to the Virginia Constitutional Convention 1829 1830 1850 1851, Virginia House Delegate 1830–1831, U.S. Representative from Virginia 1837–1839, Virginia state senator 1853–1854. Cousin of Alexander H.H. Stuart.
- Alexander H.H. Stuart (1807–1891), member of the Virginia House of Burgesses 1836–1839, U.S. Representative from Virginia 1841–1843, U.S. Secretary of the Interior 1850–1853, Virginia state senator 1857–1861, Virginia Assemblyman 1874–1877. Cousin of Archibald Stuart.

== Sturges ==
- Jonathan Sturges (1740–1819), Connecticut state representative 1772–1784, Justice of the Peace in Fairfield County, Connecticut; Delegate to the Constitutional Convention from Connecticut 1786; U.S. Representative from Connecticut 1789–1793; Justice of the Connecticut Supreme Court 1793–1805. Father of Lewis B. Sturges.
  - Lewis B. Sturges (1763–1844), Connecticut state representative 1794–1803, U.S. Representative from Connecticut 1803–1817. Son of Jonathan Sturges.

== Sullivans ==
- John Sullivan (1740–1795), delegate to the Continental Congress from New Hampshire 1774–1775 1780–1781, Attorney General of New Hampshire 1782–1786, New Hampshire Assemblyman, President of New Hampshire 1786–1788 1789–1790, Judge of the U.S. District Court of New Hampshire 1789–1795. Brother of James Sullivan.
- James Sullivan (1744–1808), Massachusetts Colony Representative 1774–1775, member of the Massachusetts General Court 1775–1776, Justice of the Massachusetts Superior Court 1776–1782, delegate to the Continental Congress from Massachusetts 1782–1783, Attorney General of Massachusetts 1790–1807, Governor of Massachusetts 1807–1808. Brother of John Sullivan.
  - George Sullivan (1771–1838), New Hampshire state representative 1805 1813, Attorney General of New Hampshire 1805–1806 1816–1835, U.S. Representative from New Hampshire 1811–1813, New Hampshire state senator 1814–1815. Son of John Sullivan.

== Sullivans of Indiana ==
- Oliver H. Smith (1794–1859), Indiana state representative 1822–1824, U.S. Representative from Indiana 1827–1829, U.S. Senator from Indiana 1837–1843. Father-in-law of Thomas L. Sullivan Sr.
- Jeremiah Sullivan (1794–1870), Indiana state representative 1819–1821, candidate for U.S. Representative from Indiana 1824 1826, Justice of the Indiana Supreme Court 1837–1846, County Judge in Indiana 1869–1870. Father of Thomas L. Sullivan Sr.
  - Thomas L. Sullivan Sr. (1819–1878), Indiana state representative 1844–1845. Son of Jeremiah Sullivan.
    - Thomas L. Sullivan (1846–1936), Circuit Court Judge in Indiana 1888, Mayor of Indianapolis, Indiana 1890–1893; candidate for Superior Court Judge in Indiana 1899. Son of Thomas L. Sullivan Sr.
      - Reginald H. Sullivan (1876–1980), Indiana state senator 1911–1913, Mayor of Indianapolis, Indiana 1930–1934 1939–1942; delegate to the Democratic National Convention 1932 1940. Son of Thomas L. Sullivan.

== Sullivans of Missouri ==
- John B. Sullivan (1897–1951), U.S. Representative from Missouri 1941–1943 1945-1947 1949–1951.
- Leonor Sullivan (1902–1988), U.S. Representative from Missouri 1953–1977. Wife of John B. Sullivan.

== Sulzers ==
- William Sulzer (1863–1941), New York Assemblyman, delegate to the Democratic National Convention 1892 1896 1900 1904 1908 1912, U.S. Representative from New York 1895–1912, Governor of New York 1913, candidate for Governor of New York 1914. Brother of Charles August Sulzer.
- Charles August Sulzer (1879–1919), Alaska Territory Senator 1914, U.S. Congressional Delegate from Alaska Territory 1917–1919 1919. Brother of William Sulzer.

== Sumters ==
- Thomas Sumter (1734–1832), Justice of the Peace in South Carolina, South Carolina state representative, South Carolina state senator 1781–1782, U.S. Representative South Carolina 1789–1793 1797–1801, U.S. Senator from South Carolina 1801–1810. Grandfather of Thomas De Lage Sumter.
  - Thomas De Lage Sumter (1809–1874), U.S. Representative from South Carolina 1839–1843. Grandson of Thomas Sumter.

== Sunias ==
- Fofo Iosefa Fiti Sunia (born 1937), American Samoa Territory Senator 1970–1978, U.S. Congressional Delegate from American Samoa 1981–1988. Brother of Tauese Sunia and Ipulasi Sunia.
- Tauese Sunia (1941–2003), Governor of American Samoa 1997–2003. Brother of Fofo Iosefa Fiti Sunia and Ipulasi Sunia.
- Ipulasi Sunia (born 1943), Treasurer of American Samoa, Lieutenant Governor of American Samoa. Brother of Fofo Iosefa Fiti Sunia and Tauese Sunia.
- Eni Faleomavaega (1943–2017), Lieutenant Governor of American Samoa 1985–1989, U.S. Congressional Delegate from American Samoa 1989–2015, delegate to the Democratic National Convention 1996 2000 2004. Cousin of Fofo Iosefa Fiti Sunia, Tauese Sunia, and Ipulasi Sunia.

== Sununus ==
- John H. Sununu (born 1939), New Hampshire state representative 1973–1974, candidate for U.S. Senate from New Hampshire 1980, Governor of New Hampshire 1983–1989, delegate to the Republican National Convention 1988, White House Chief of Staff 1989–1991, chairman of the New Hampshire Republican Party 2009–2011. Father of John E. Sununu and Chris Sununu.
  - John E. Sununu (born 1964), U.S. Representative from New Hampshire 1997–2003, U.S. Senator from New Hampshire 2003–2009. Son of John H. Sununu and older brother of Chris Sununu.
  - Chris Sununu (born 1974), 82nd Governor of New Hampshire 2017–2025. Son of John H. Sununu and younger brother of John E. Sununu.

== Suozzis ==
- Joseph A. Suozzi (1921–2016), Glen Cove, New York City Judge 1950–1955, Mayor of Glen Cove, New York 1956–1960, candidate for County Executive of Nassau County, New York 1958, Justice of Supreme Court of the State of New York 1961–1976, associate justice of the Appellate Division, Second Department 1976–1980, senior partner in Meyer, Suozzi, English & Klein, P.C 1980–unknown, Father of Thomas R. Suozzi, Brother of Vincent "Jimmy" Suozzi, Uncle of Ralph Suozzi.
  - Thomas R. Suozzi (born 1962), Mayor of Glen Cove, New York 1994–2001, candidate for Mayor of Glen Cove 1991, delegate to Democratic National Convention from New York 1996, 2000, 2008, Nassau County, New York County Executive 2002–2009, candidate for Nassau County Executive 2013, candidate for Governor of New York in Democratic Primary 2006, candidate for Congress in New York's 3rd District 2016, Congressman from New York's 3rd Congressional District 2017–2023, 2024–present, lawyer at Harris Beach Suozzi, son of Joseph Suozzi, Cousin of Ralph Suozzi, Nephew of Vincent Suozzi.
- Vincent A. "Jimmy" Suozzi (1926–2006), Mayor of Glen Cove, New York 1973–1979, 1984–1987, candidate for New York Assembly District 11 1965, Deputy Treasurer for County Executive Eugene Nickerson mid-1960s, Glen Cove City Comptroller 2001–2004, candidate for Nassau County, New York Comptroller 1989, candidate for Nassau County Assessor 1997, brother of Joseph Suozzi, father of Ralph Suozzi, Uncle of Tom Suozzi.
  - Ralph V. Suozzi (born 1956), Mayor of Glen Cove, New York 2006–2013, Garden City, New York Village Administrator 2014–present, son of Vincent Suozzi, Cousin of Tom Suozzi, Nephew of Joseph Suozzi.

== Sutherlands ==
- John Sutherland (1827–1889), Missouri state senator. Father of Howard Sutherland.
  - Howard Sutherland (1865–1950), West Virginia state senator 1909–1912, U.S. Representative from West Virginia 1913–1917, U.S. Senator from West Virginia 1917–1923, delegate to the Republican National Convention 1924 1932 1936. Son of John Sutherland.

== Sutherlins and Williamsons ==
- George Williamson (1829–1882), U.S. Minister to Costa Rica 1873–1879, U.S. Minister to Salvador 1873–1879, U.S. Minister to Guatemala 1873–1879, U.S. Minister to Honduras 1873–1879, U.S. Minister to Nicaragua 1873–1879. Father-in-law of Edgar Williamson Sutherlin.
  - Edgar Williamson Sutherlin, Louisiana state senator. Son-in-law of George Williamson.

== Swaynes ==
- Noah Haynes Swayne (1804–1884), Associate Justice of the Supreme Court of the United States 1862–1881.
  - Wager Swayne (1834–1902), Military Governor of Alabama 1867–1868. Son of Noah Haynes Swayne.

== Sweeneys ==
- Martin L. Sweeney (1885–1960), Ohio state representative 1913–1914, Judge of the Cleveland, Ohio Municipal Court 1924–1932; delegate to the Republican National Convention 1932; U.S. Representative from Ohio 1931–1943; candidate for Democratic nomination for Mayor of Cleveland, Ohio 1933 1941; candidate for Democratic nomination for Governor of Ohio 1944. Father of Robert E. Sweeney.
  - Robert E. Sweeney (1924–2007), candidate for Attorney General of Ohio 1962 1966, U.S. Representative from Ohio 1965–1967, Commissioner of Cuyahoga County, Ohio 1976–1980. Son of Martin L. Sweeney.

== Sweetsers and Hitchingses ==
- Charles Sweetser (1793–1865), member of the Massachusetts House of Representatives (1839, 1851).
  - George H. Sweetser (1823–1870), member of the Massachusetts Senate (1867, 1869), member of the Massachusetts House of Representatives (1852). Son of Charles Sweetser.
    - Albert H. Sweetser (1848–1889), member of the Massachusetts House of Representatives (1883). Son of George H. Sweetser.
      - George A. Sweetser (1872–1961), member of the Wellesley, Massachusetts board of selectmen (1907–1911). Son of Albert H. Sweetser.
  - John B. Hitchings (1815–1887), member of the Massachusetts House of Representatives (1853). Son-in-law of Charles Sweetser.
    - Charles S. Hitchings (1844–1894), member of the Massachusetts House of Representatives (1886–1887). Son of John B. Hitchings.
  - Benjamin Hitchings Jr. (1813–1893), member of the Massachusetts House of Representatives (1841). Brother of John B. Hitchings.
  - Otis M. Hitchings (1822–1894), member of the Massachusetts House of Representatives (1876). Brother of John B. Hitchings.

== Swensons ==
- Swen Swenson (1836–1905), Minnesota state representative 1887. Brother of Lars Swenson.
- Lars Swenson (1842–1904), Minnesota state senator 1887–1889. Brother of Swen Swenson.
  - Lauritz S. Swenson (1865–1947), delegate to the Republican National Convention 1896, U.S. Minister to Denmark 1897–1905, U.S. Minister to Switzerland 1910–1911, U.S. Minister to Norway 1911–1913 1921–1930, U.S. Minister to the Netherlands 1931–1934. Son of Swen Swenson.
  - Oscar A. Swenson (1877–1951), Minnesota state representative 1913–1931, Minnesota state senator 1937–1949. Son of Swen Swenson.
  - Alfred J. Pearson (1869–1939), U.S. Minister to Poland 1924–1925, U.S. Minister to Finland 1925–1930. Son-in-law of Lars Swenson.

== Sykes ==
- James Sykes (1725–1792), delegate to the Continental Congress from Delaware 1777, Delaware State Court Judge. Father of James Sykes.
  - James Sykes (1761–1822), Delaware state senator, Governor of Delaware. Son of James Sykes.

== Symingtons ==
See Symington family
