= Spreng =

Spreng may refer to:

- 30 cm Wurfkörper 42 Spreng, a rocket
- Michael Spreng (1947–2022), American politician
- Churie Spreng, American politician
- Sebastian Spreng (born 1956), Argentine-born American visual artist and music journalist
- Liselotte Spreng (1912–1992), Swiss women's rights activist
- Spreng., taxonomic author abbreviation of Kurt Polycarp Joachim Sprengel (1766–1833), German botanist and physician
