= Senator Shannon =

Senator Shannon may refer to:

- Charles E. Shannon Jr. (1943–2005), Massachusetts State Senate
- George R. Shannon (1818–1891), Texas State Senate
- Thomas Bowles Shannon (1827–1897), California State Senate
- Thomas Shannon (Ohio politician) (1786–1846), Ohio State Senate
