= Wilson Shannon =

American politician; governor of Ohio and Kansas Territory

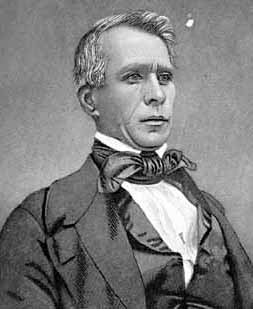

2nd Territorial Governor of Kansas
- In office September 7, 1855 – August 18, 1856
- Preceded by: Andrew Reeder
- Succeeded by: John W. Geary

14th and 16th Governor of Ohio
- In office December 13, 1838 – December 16, 1840
- Preceded by: Joseph Vance
- Succeeded by: Thomas Corwin
- In office December 14, 1842 – April 15, 1844
- Preceded by: Thomas Corwin
- Succeeded by: Thomas W. Bartley

Member of the U.S. House of Representatives from Ohio's 17th district
- In office March 4, 1853 – March 3, 1855
- Preceded by: Joseph Cable
- Succeeded by: Charles J. Albright

Personal details
- Born: Wilson Shannon; February 24, 1802 Belmont County, Northwest Territory
- Died: August 30, 1877 (aged 75) Lawrence, Kansas, U.S.
- Resting place: Oak Hill Cemetery
- Party: Democratic
- Spouse(s): Elizabeth Ellis, Sarah Osbun
- Education: Ohio University; Transylvania University
- Profession: attorney, politician

Wilson Shannon (February 24, 1802 – August 30, 1877) was an American attorney and Democratic Party politician from Ohio. He served one term in the U.S. House of Representatives and was the 14th and 16th governor of Ohio. He was the first Ohio governor born in the state. He was the second governor of the Kansas Territory. He failed to stop an attack by pro-slavery forces and retaliation ensued. He fled and submitted a resignation letter before receiving official news of his firing. Earlier in his career he filed sued for past due loans against Franklin College and helped bankrupt and close down the abolitionist institution before starting a rival institution which failed. Franklin College was re-established.

== Early life ==
Shannon was born in Belmont County in the Northwest Territory, the son of an Irish immigrant, George Shannon, who fought in the Revolutionary War. Wilson Shannon's elder brother, Thomas Shannon, served a partial term in the United States House of Representatives from 1826–1827. His oldest brother, George Shannon, was the youngest member of the Lewis and Clark Expedition.

== Ohio politics ==
After attending Ohio University, Franklin College in New Athens, Ohio and Transylvania University in Kentucky. Shannon was admitted to the bar and began practicing law in 1830. He was prosecuting attorney for Belmont County from 1833 to 1835.

Shannon ran for the U.S. House of Representatives in 1832, losing by only 37 votes. Shannon then served as a prosecutor in Belmont County before winning election to the governorship in 1838. He lost a re-election bid to the Whig candidate, Thomas Corwin, in 1840, but defeated Corwin for a second term two years later.

== Federal appointments ==
Shannon resigned on April 15, 1844, to take up an appointment from President John Tyler as Minister to Mexico. Shannon spent a year in the post before being recalled.

Shannon went to California in the 1849 gold rush but returned and later won election to the U.S. House of Representatives in 1852. He served a single term before taking up an appointment from President Franklin Pierce as Governor of the Kansas Territory in 1855.

== Kansas Territory ==
Shannon was commissioned by President Pierce on August 10, 1855. He took the oath of office on September 7, 1855, and served until June 24, 1856, having been sworn into office a second time on June 13, 1856. He then served from July 7 through August 18, 1856, when he was removed from office by the President. Shannon was known for his Southern sympathies, so much so that he was described by a contemporary as "an extreme Southern man in politics, of the border ruffian type." Shannon frequently used federal troops to bring peace to areas of the territory where violence was commonplace. However, the problems of government administration he experienced while Minister to Mexico plagued him in Kansas, and he stumbled into one political crisis after another.

In May 1856, a large proslavery force entered Lawrence and destroyed many buildings and printing presses in what became known as the "Sacking of Lawrence." Shannon failed to intervene to protect the citizens and their property. In retaliation, John Brown and a small group of followers moved along Pottawatomie Creek, 40 miles south of Lawrence, killing five proslavery settlers. The "Pottawatomie massacre", as it came to be known, brought even more violence into the territory. Shannon lost complete control of the territory and left for St. Louis on June 23, 1856, leaving Daniel Woodson as acting governor.

While at Lecompton, Shannon offered President Pierce his resignation on August 18, 1856, but Pierce had already determined to fire him. In his resignation he wrote that he had

received unofficial information of my removal from office, and finding myself here without the moral power which my official station confers, and being destitute of any adequate military force to preserve the peace of the country, I feel it due to myself, as well as to the government, to notify you that I am unwilling to perform the duties of government of this territory any longer. You will therefore consider my official connection at an end.

Shannon feared for his life and returned east. He met John Geary, the next territorial governor, on September 7 at Glasgow, Missouri, though their meeting was brief.

Despite his troubled term as territorial governor of Kansas, Shannon served the longest continuous term of any Kansas territorial governor, more than nine-and-one-half months of an eleven-month term.

== Later life ==
Shannon returned to Kansas soon after leaving office. He set up a law practice in Lecompton, and later a practice in Lawrence and Topeka. To visitors he frequently stated: "Govern Kansas in 1855 and '56! You might as well attempt to govern the devil in hell."

== Death and legacy ==
Shannon died in Lawrence on August 30, 1877, and is buried in Oak Hill Cemetery in Lawrence.

Shannon, Kansas, the first county seat of Anderson County, was named for Shannon. The town ceased to exist in 1860.

== See also ==
- Shannon Political Family

U.S. House of Representatives
Preceded by Joseph Cable	United States Representative from Ohio's 17th congressional district 1853–1855	Succeeded by Charles J. Albright
Diplomatic posts
Preceded by Waddy Thompson	United States Ambassador to Mexico; 1844–1845	Succeeded by John Slidell
Party political offices
Preceded by Eli Baldwin	Democratic Party nominee for Governor of Ohio; 1838, 1840, 1842	Succeeded by David Tod
