= George Shannon (explorer) =

American explorer (1785–1836)

- Born: c. 1785; Pennsylvania, U.S.
- Died: August 30, 1836 (aged 51)
- Resting place: Massie Mill Cemetery, Palmyra, Missouri
- Known for: Accompanied the Lewis and Clark Expedition
- Spouse: Ruth Snowden Price

George Shannon (c. 1785–August 30, 1836), was an American explorer, lawyer, and politician. He was the youngest member of the Lewis and Clark Expedition (not counting the infant Jean Baptiste Charbonneau), joining at the age of 17, was born in Pennsylvania of Irish ancestry. He joined the Corps of Discovery in August 1803, as one of the three men (and Seaman) from Pittsburgh recruited by Lewis as he was waiting for the completion of the voyage's vessels in the city.

George Shannon was one of the "Nine men from Kentucky". He was lost for 16 days.

His father had died in February 1803 by freezing. His brothers include Congressman Thomas Shannon, Ohio/Kansas Governor Wilson Shannon, David Shannon, and lawyer James Shannon. He had nine siblings, six of them being brothers, and was the eldest of them. Soon after his father's death, he went to Philadelphia in search of employment to support his family, before returning home. He had seven children with Ruth Snowden Price, one of them including Texas Senate member George Ross Shannon.

== Lewis and Clark Expedition ==
On August 26, 1804, he was sent to retrieve two pack horses; he was separated from the party for sixteen days and nearly starved, as he went without food for twelve days except for some grapes and rabbits. At first, he thought he was behind the expedition, so he sped up thinking he could catch up. Then, getting hungry, he went downstream to look for a trading party he could stay with.

Shannon got lost again August 6, 1805, when the expedition was at the Three Forks. He was dispatched up a fork the party had named Wisdom (the middle fork was named Jefferson and the placid fork, Philanthropy). He rejoined the party after three days by backtracking to the forks and following the trail of the others.

In 1807, he was with a party led by Nathaniel Pryor that was attempting to return the Mandan chief Sheheke to his people. He was wounded in an encounter with the Arikaras and lost a leg; he would eventually receive a government pension.

== Later life ==
In 1808, Shannon had moved to Lexington, Kentucky, to study law at Transylvania University.

In 1810, he assisted in Nicholas Biddle's history of the expedition. Later, Clark asked him to join a fur trading enterprise, but Shannon chose to continue studying law instead. By 1818 he had a law practice in Lexington, Kentucky with Thomas T. Barr, a former Transylvania University trustee and Kentucky state legislator. That year, his assets included $700, one cow, and two enslaved people. By 1822, he owned his home, one horse, three cows, $2,480, and six enslaved people.

On September 19, 1813, he married Ruth Snowden Price, whom he met while in college, and the two had seven children between 1814 and 1825.

He served three consecutive one year terms in the Kentucky House of Representatives from 1820 to 1823. In 1832, he ran for senator from Missouri. He was elected to the Missouri House of Representatives soon before his death. He died on August 30, 1836, of illness, aged 51, and was buried in Massie Mill Cemetery in Palmyra, Missouri. His wife had also died soon afterwards.

== Legacy ==
George Shannon is the namesake of Shannon County, Missouri.

In 2001, a number of northeastern Nebraska communities formed Shannon Trail Promoters, with the goal of increasing tourism in the forthcoming bicentennial year of the Lewis and Clark Expedition. The organization commissioned thirteen wooden chainsaw sculptures of Shannon, which were placed in participating communities along a 240-mile (390 km) Shannon Trail. Sixteen wayside markers recounting aspects of Shannon's career were also placed along the trail, which runs through the region in which Shannon is thought to have wandered during his 1804 separation from the expedition. In keeping with Shannon's claim to fame, a scavenger hunt was held, with tourists urged to "Find Private Shannon" by visiting all sixteen markers. The organization continues to stage Shannon-themed events.

In 2007, when a new bridge was under construction to carry U.S. Highway 81 across the Missouri River from Cedar County, Nebraska to Yankton, South Dakota, one of the names proposed for it was the Private Shannon Bridge. In an online poll, the name was selected by a plurality of those responding, garnering 26% of the votes. However, the Yankton-based committee responsible for naming the bridge elected to call it the Yankton Discovery Bridge, a choice that did not sit well with Nebraskans. The "Yankton" was eventually dropped from the name, and the bridge is now known as the Discovery Bridge.

Shannon is the subject of the poet Campbell McGrath's 2009 work Shannon: A Poem of the Lewis and Clark Expedition. Shannon has been featured elsewhere in literature, film and television including Ken Burn's Lewis and Clark where he was voiced by Tim Clark, Leon Martell's Bea[u]tiful in the Extreme where he was portrayed by Andrew David James. He is also the central character in the historical fiction book My Travels with Capts. Lewis & Clark, by George Shannon written by Kate McMullan. McMullan, a descendant of Shannon's, based the work on his actual journals.

== See also ==
- Shannon Political Family
