= Levi P. Smith =

American politician

Levi P. Smith (August 30, 1885 – June 18, 1970) was a Vermont lawyer, banker and politician who served as President of the Vermont State Senate.

== Biography ==
Levi Pease Smith was born in Burlington, Vermont on August 30, 1885. He attended the schools of Burlington, and was a 1904 graduate of Burlington High School. Smith graduated from the University of Vermont in 1908 and Harvard Law School in 1911. Smith practiced law in Burlington before becoming an executive of the Burlington Savings Bank, an institution managed by members of his family for several generations. He rose through the ranks to become president and chairman of the board.

A Republican, Smith served in the Vermont House of Representatives from 1923 to 1925. From 1925 to 1931 he served in the Vermont Senate, and he was Senate President from 1927 to 1931.

Smith died in Burlington on June 18, 1970.

== Family ==
In 1914, Smith married Julia Spear Pease of Burlington. They were the parents of sons Frederick Plympton Smith, Robert Pease Smith, and Levi Pease Smith. Smith was the grandfather of Peter Plympton Smith and Charles Plympton Smith.

Political offices
Preceded by Edward H. Edgerton	President pro tempore of the Vermont State Senate; 1927 – 1931	Succeeded by William H. Wills
