= Marie Strinden =

American politician

Marie J. Strinden

Member of the North Dakota House of Representatives from the 18th district
- In office 2013–Present

Personal details
- Party: Democratic-NPL
- Education: University of North Dakota

Marie Strinden is a Democratic member of the North Dakota House of Representatives, representing the 18th district. Strinden was the executive director of the North Valley Arts Council, stepping down in 2014 after financial irregularities were discovered.
