= Frederick Plympton Smith =

American lawyer, banker and politician (1915–1985)

Frederick P. Smith (1915 – 1985) was an American lawyer, banker, and politician. He was born in Vermont to Levi P. Smith and Julia Pease Smith and attended school in Burlington, Vermont. After graduation from Princeton University in 1937 he received a law degree from Harvard Law School. He served in the United States Navy during World War II.

From 1959 to 1976 Smith was President of the Burlington Savings Bank, a position also held by his father and grandfather. He was Chairman of the bank's board from 1976 until 1985. He was President of the Vermont Bankers Association and the National Association of Mutual Savings Banks, as well as a member of the Federal Savings and Loan Advisory Council.

Smith was a member of the Vermont House of Representatives from 1946 to 1948 and of the Vermont State Senate from 1972 to 1974. He served two terms as Chairman of the Vermont Republican Party.

Smith served on the boards of trustees of the University of Vermont, Bennington College and Champlain College and as a director of the Mount Mansfield Company, the National Life Insurance Company, and the New England Telephone Company.

Smith was married to Marjorie Hewitt Smith (1915-1996) for 48 years from 1938 until his death. They had five children, including Peter Plympton Smith and Charles Plympton Smith.
