= George R. Shannon =

American politician

George Ross Shannon (December 14, 1818 – 1891) was a member of the Texas Senate. He was born in Lexington, Kentucky, the son of George Shannon of the Lewis and Clark Expedition. Shannon along with his brother, William, and sister, Sophie, settled in Johnson County in the 1850s. He became chief justice of the county and was elected to the Texas Senate in 1870. Shannon later moved to Fowler, California where he died in 1891.

== See also ==
- Shannon Political Family

Texas Senate
Preceded by James W. McDade	Texas State Senator from District 23; 1870–1872	Succeeded by Andrew J. Ball
