= Thomas Shannon (Ohio politician) =

American politician

Member of the U.S. House of Representatives from Ohio's 10th district
- In office December 4, 1826 – March 3, 1827
- Preceded by: David Jennings
- Succeeded by: John Davenport

Member of the Ohio House of Representatives from Belmont County
- In office 1824–1825
- Preceded by: New district
- Succeeded by: William Dunn; William Perrine

Member of the Ohio House of Representatives from Belmont and Monroe counties
- In office 1819–1823
- Preceded by: William Dunn; Charles Hammond; George Paull
- Succeeded by: Isaac Atkinson; William Perrine; John Scatterday

Member of the Ohio Senate from Belmont County
- In office December 7, 1829 – December 4, 1831
- Preceded by: William Blackstone Hubbard
- Succeeded by: William Dunn
- In office 1837-1843

Personal details
- Born: November 15, 1786 Washington County, Pennsylvania, US
- Died: March 16, 1843 (aged 56) Barnesville, Ohio, US
- Resting place: Green Mount Cemetery
- Party: Adams

Thomas Shannon (November 15, 1786 – March 16, 1843) was an American politician. He served briefly as a U.S. representative from Ohio from December 1826 to January 1827.

== Biography ==
Born in Washington County, Pennsylvania, he attended public schools and moved to Ohio with his parents, who settled in Belmont County, Ohio in 1800. He engaged in agricultural pursuits and later moved to Barnesville in Belmont County in 1812 where he entered the mercantile business. During the War of 1812 served as captain of Belmont County Company in Colonel John Delong's regiment.

=== Congress ===
He served as a member of the Ohio House of Representatives from 1819 to 1822 and again in 1824 and 1825. In 1826, he was elected as an Adams candidate to the 19th Congress to fill the vacancy caused by the resignation of David Jennings and served from December 4, 1826, to March 3, 1827.

=== Later career ===
He did not seek renomination in 1827 and returned to Barnesville, Ohio, where he became a leaf-tobacco merchant. He was elected to and served in the Ohio State Senate in 1829 and again from 1837 to 1843. He died in Barnesville and is interred in Green Mount Cemetery.

Thomas Shannon was the brother of Wilson Shannon, Governor of Ohio and Territorial Governor of Kansas Territory. He was also brother of George Shannon, who participated in the Lewis and Clark Expedition and was also a politician and lawyer.

=== Death ===
Shannon died in Barnesville, Ohio March 16, 1943 at the age of 56.

== See also ==
- Shannon Political Family

Ohio House of Representatives
Preceded by William Dunn; Charles Hammond; George Paull	Representative from Belmont and Monroe Counties; 1819–1823; Served alongside: Alexander Armstrong (1821–1823), William Dunn (1819–1823), Charles Hammond (1820–1821), John Smith (1819–1820)	Succeeded by Isaac Atkinson; William Perrine; John Scatterday
New district	Representative from Belmont County; 1824–1825; Served alongside: John Davenport	Succeeded by William Dunn; William Perrine
U.S. House of Representatives
Preceded by David Jennings	Member of the U.S. House of Representatives from Ohio's 10th congressional district December 4, 1826–March 3, 1827	Succeeded by John Davenport
Ohio Senate
Preceded by William Blackstone Hubbard	Senator from Belmont County; December 7, 1829 - December 4, 1831	Succeeded by William Dunn
