= Flynn Center for the Performing Arts =

Arts venue in Burlington, VT, US

Coordinates: 44°28′31″N 73°12′47″W

The Flynn Center for the Performing Arts known as The Flynn is an arts venue in Burlington, Vermont. It is based in a refurbished Art Deco movie palace.
