= Churie Spreng =

American politician

Member of the Missouri House of Representatives from the 76th district
- In office 2011–2013
- Preceded by: Michael Spreng

Personal details
- Party: Democratic
- Spouse: Michael Spreng

Churie Spreng is an American politician. She was member of the Missouri House of Representatives for the 76th district.
