= Michael Spreng =

American politician (1947–2022)

Member of the Missouri House of Representatives from the 76th district
- In office 2003–2011
- Succeeded by: Churie Spreng

Personal details
- Born: December 28, 1947
- Died: September 10, 2022 (aged 74)
- Party: Democratic
- Spouse: Churie Spreng

Michael Spreng (December 28, 1947 – September 10, 2022) was an American politician. He was member of the Missouri House of Representatives for the 76th district.

Spreng died in 2022.
