= 2020 North Dakota Senate election =

- November 3, 2020

23 of the 47 seats in the North Dakota Senate 24 seats needed for a majority
- Turnout: 62.69%
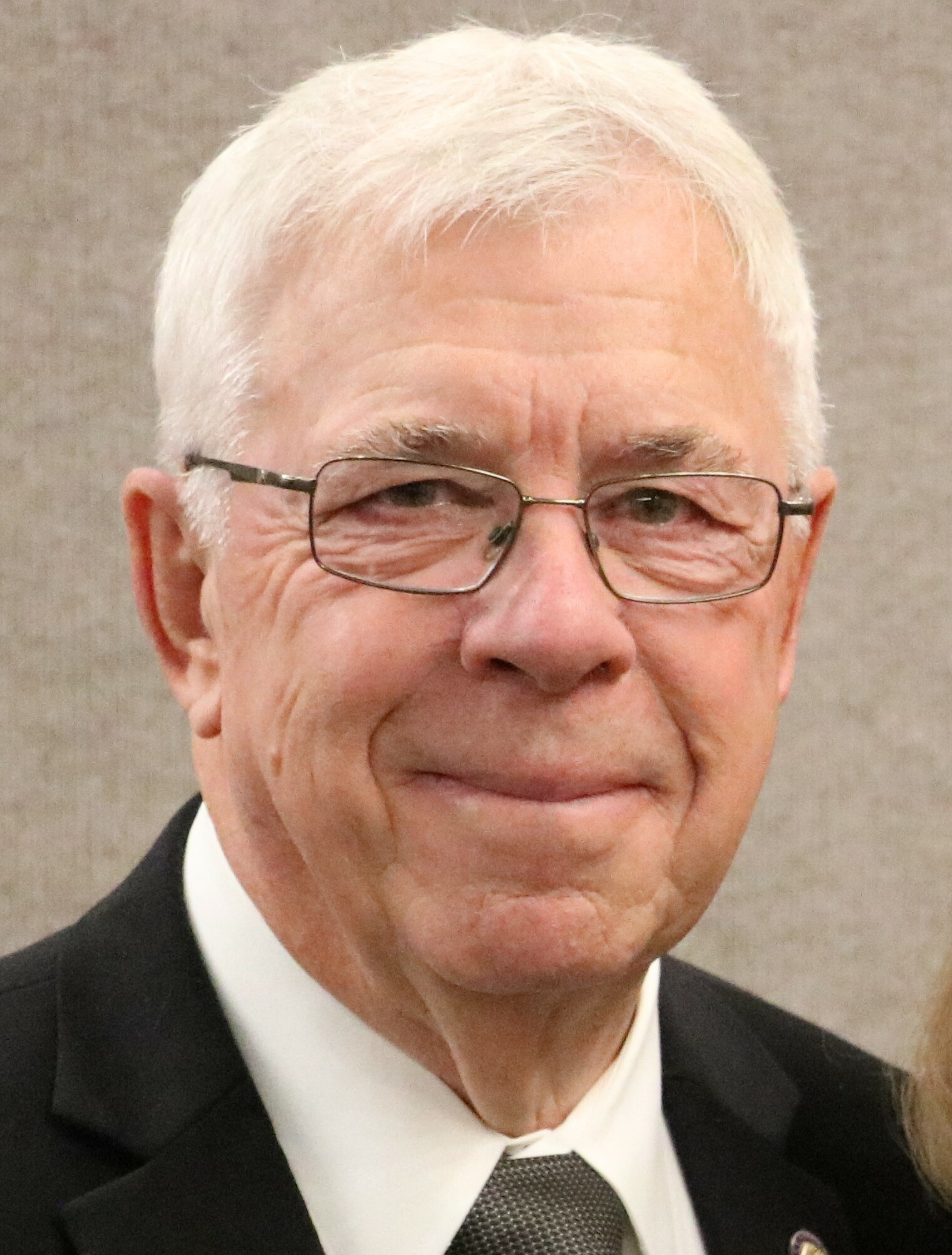

	Majority party	Minority party
Leader	Rich Wardner	Joan Heckaman
Party	Republican	Democratic–NPL
Leader's seat	37th district	23rd district
Seats before	37	10
Seats won	40	7
Seat change	▲3	▼3
Popular vote	122,164	43,836
Percentage	73.10%	26.23%
- Results of the elections: Republican gain Democratic hold Republican hold No election

The 2020 North Dakota Senate election was held on November 3, 2020, to elect members from all even-numbered seats of the North Dakota Senate. Primary elections were held on June 9, 2020.

== Retirements ==
=== Republicans ===
1. District 22: Gary Lee retired.
2. District 34: Dwight Cook retired.

== Incumbents defeated ==
=== In the general election ===
==== Democrats ====
1. District 12: John Grabinger lost re-election to Cole Conley.
2. District 24: Larry Robinson lost re-election to Michael Wobbema.
3. District 26: Jim Dotzenrod lost re-election to Jason Heitkamp.

== Predictions ==
Source	Ranking	As of
The Cook Political Report	Safe R	October 21, 2020

== Close races ==
Districts where the margin of victory was under 10%:

1. District 24, 1.95% (gain)
2. District 16, 4.46%
3. District 26, 5.76% (gain)
4. District 42, 6.9%
5. District 18, 7.69%
6. District 46, 8.2%
7. District 44, 8.52%

== Election results ==
=== District 2 ===
North Dakota Senate District 2 general election
Party	Candidate	Votes	%
Republican	David Rust (incumbent)	9,954	98.96%
Write-in		105	1.04%
Total votes		10,059	100.0%
Republican hold			

=== District 4 ===
North Dakota Senate District 4 general election
Party	Candidate	Votes	%
Republican	Jordan Kannianen (incumbent)	4,960	67.76%
Democratic–NPL	Lisa Finley-DeVille	2,353	32.14%
Write-in		7	0.10%
Total votes		7,320	100.0%
Republican hold			

=== District 6 ===
North Dakota Senate District 6 general election
Party	Candidate	Votes	%
Republican	Shawn Vedaa (incumbent)	5,598	72.68%
Democratic–NPL	Morris Holen Jr	2,098	27.24%
Write-in		6	0.08%
Total votes		7,702	100.0%
Republican hold			

=== District 8 ===
North Dakota Senate District 8 election
Party	Candidate	Votes	%
Republican	Howard C. Anderson Jr. (incumbent)	7,984	98.42%
Write-in		128	1.58%
Total votes		8,112	100.0%
Republican hold			

=== District 10 ===
North Dakota Senate District 10 general election
Party	Candidate	Votes	%
Republican	Janne Myrdal (incumbent)	5,067	74.31%
Democratic–NPL	Charlie Hart	1,744	25.58%
Write-in		8	0.12%
Total votes		6,819	100.0%
Republican hold			

=== District 12 ===
North Dakota Senate District 10 general election
Party	Candidate	Votes	%
Republican	Cole Conley	3,258	56.01%
Democratic–NPL	John Grabinger (incumbent)	2,549	43.82%
Write-in		10	0.17%
Total votes		5,817	100.0%
Republican gain from Democratic–NPL			

=== District 14 ===
North Dakota Senate District 14 general election
Party	Candidate	Votes	%
Republican	Jerry Klein (incumbent)	6,152	79.17%
Democratic–NPL	Jenna Vanhorne	1,612	20.74%
Write-in		7	0.09%
Total votes		7,771	100.0%
Republican hold			

=== District 16 ===
North Dakota Senate District 16 general election
Party	Candidate	Votes	%
Republican	David Clemens (incumbent)	5,439	52.14%
Democratic–NPL	Kari Breker	4,973	47.68%
Write-in		19	0.18%
Total votes		10,431	100.0%
Republican hold			

=== District 18 ===
North Dakota Senate District 18 general election
Party	Candidate	Votes	%
Republican	Scott Meyer (incumbent)	2,949	53.77%
Democratic–NPL	Kyle Thorson	2,527	46.08%
Write-in		8	0.15%
Total votes		5,484	100.0%
Republican hold			

=== District 20 ===
North Dakota Senate District 20 general election
Party	Candidate	Votes	%
Republican	Randy Lemm (incumbent)	4,654	68.81%
Democratic–NPL	Paul Hanson	2,106	31.14%
Write-in		4	0.06%
Total votes		6,764	100.0%
Republican hold			

=== District 22 ===
North Dakota Senate District 22 general election
Party	Candidate	Votes	%
Republican	Mark Weber	7,541	68.24%
Democratic–NPL	Laetitia Hellerud	3,505	31.72%
Write-in		5	0.05%
Total votes		11,051	100.0%
Republican hold			

=== District 24 ===
North Dakota Senate District 24 general election
Party	Candidate	Votes	%
Republican	Michael Wobbema	3,572	50.90%
Democratic–NPL	Larry Robinson (incumbent)	3,435	48.95%
Write-in		10	0.14%
Total votes		7,017	100.0%
Republican gain from Democratic–NPL			

=== District 26 ===
North Dakota Senate District 26 general election
Party	Candidate	Votes	%
Republican	Jason Heitkamp	3,683	52.75%
Democratic–NPL	Jim Dotzenrod (incumbent)	3,295	47.19%
Write-in		4	0.06%
Total votes		6,982	100.0%
Republican gain from Democratic–NPL			

=== District 28 ===
North Dakota Senate District 28 general election
Party	Candidate	Votes	%
Republican	Robert Erbele (incumbent)	6,770	98.47%
Write-in		105	1.53%
Total votes		6,875	100.0%
Republican hold			

=== District 30 ===
North Dakota Senate District 30 general election
Party	Candidate	Votes	%
Republican	Diane Larson (incumbent)	6,307	97.80%
Write-in		142	2.20%
Total votes		6,449	100.0%
Republican hold			

=== District 32 ===
North Dakota Senate District 32 general election
Party	Candidate	Votes	%
Republican	Dick Dever (incumbent)	4,352	65.11%
Democratic–NPL	Amelia Doll	2,312	34.59%
Write-in		20	0.30%
Total votes		6,684	100.0%
Republican hold			

=== District 34 ===
North Dakota Senate District 34 general election
Party	Candidate	Votes	%
Republican	Doug Larsen	6,062	73.02%
Democratic–NPL	Adam Michal	2,224	26.79%
Write-in		16	0.19%
Total votes		8,302	100.0%
Republican hold			

=== District 36 ===
North Dakota Senate District 36 general election
Party	Candidate	Votes	%
Republican	Jay Elkin (incumbent)	7,964	97.38%
Write-in		214	2.62%
Total votes		8,178	100.0%
Republican hold			

=== District 38 ===
North Dakota Senate District 38 general election
Party	Candidate	Votes	%
Republican	David Hogue (incumbent)	6,254	98.13%
Write-in		119	1.87%
Total votes		6,373	100.0%
Republican hold			

=== District 40 ===
North Dakota Senate District 40 general election
Party	Candidate	Votes	%
Republican	Karen Krebsbach (incumbent)	4,255	96.66%
Write-in		147	3.34%
Total votes		4,402	100.0%
Republican hold			

=== District 42 ===
North Dakota Senate District 42 general election
Party	Candidate	Votes	%
Republican	Curt Kreun (incumbent)	1,856	53.38%
Democratic–NPL	Melissa Gjellstad	1,616	46.48%
Write-in		5	0.14%
Total votes		3,477	100.0%
Republican hold			

=== District 44 ===
North Dakota Senate District 44 general election
Party	Candidate	Votes	%
Democratic–NPL	Merrill Piepkorn (incumbent)	3,847	54.17%
Republican	Tim Flakoll	3,242	45.65%
Write-in		13	0.18%
Total votes		7,102	100.0%
Democratic–NPL hold			

=== District 46 ===
North Dakota Senate District 46 general election
Party	Candidate	Votes	%
Republican	Jim Roers (incumbent)	4,291	54.06%
Democratic–NPL	Terri Hedman	3,640	45.86%
Write-in		7	0.09%
Total votes		7,938	100.0%
Republican hold			

== See also ==
- 2020 North Dakota elections
- 2020 United States state legislative elections
