= 2024 North Dakota Senate election =

- November 5, 2024

25 of 47 seats in the North Dakota Senate (even-numbered districts plus two special elections in the 9th and 15th districts).
	Majority party	Minority party
Leader	Donald Schaible	Kathy Hogan
Party	Republican	Democratic–NPL
Leader since	January 3, 2023	January 3, 2023
Leader's seat	31st district	21st district
Seats before	43	4
Seats after	42	5
Seat change	▼1	▲1
Popular vote	134,438	40,532
Percentage	75.34%	22.69%
- Democratic–NPL gain Republican hold Democratic–NPL hold No election Republican: 50–60% 60–70% 70–80% 80–90% 90–100% Democratic–NPL: 50–60% 60–70% 90–100%
President pro tempore before election
Donald Schaible
Republican
Elected President pro tempore
Brad Bekkedahl
Republican

The 2024 North Dakota Senate election took place on November 5, 2024, as part of the 2024 United States elections. Senators serve four-year terms. Elections are staggered such that half the senate districts have elections every two years (even-numbered seats are up on presidential election years.)

In the 2022 North Dakota elections, a ballot measure created term limits of eight years in the North Dakota Senate, which was put into effect starting January 2023. However, no candidate up for election will be affected by the term limits.

In January 2024, Federal District Court Judge Peter Welte required North Dakota to substantially alter Legislative District 9 in response to a lawsuit by the Turtle Mountain Band of Chippewa Indians and the Spirit Lake Tribe. The tribes alleged that the House of Representatives districts established by the North Dakota legislature violated the voting rights act by preventing members of the Spirit Lake Tribe from electing a candidate of their choice to the legislature. The court-ordered new District 9, which the Turtle Mountain and Spirit Lake tribes had proposed, includes both the Turtle Mountain and Spirit Lake reservations.

== Summary ==
Summary of the 2024 North Dakota Senate election results
Party	Candidates	Votes	%	Seats				
Party	Candidates	Votes	%	Before 68th Leg.	Up	Won	After 69th Leg.	+/–
Republican	24	134,438	75.33	43	23	22	42	▼1
Democratic–NPL	15	40,532	22.71	4	2	3	5	▲1
Independents	1	1,533	0.86	0	0	0	0	0
Write-in		1,974	1.11	—				
Total		178,477	100%	47	25		47	Steady

Popular vote
Republican	75.33%
Democratic–NPL	22.71%
Independents	0.86%
Write-ins	1.11%

Seats won
Republican	88.00%
Democratic–NPL	12.00%

Total senate seats
Republican	89.36%
Democratic–NPL	10.64%

== Predictions ==
Source	Ranking	As of
Sabato's Crystal Ball	Safe R	October 23, 2024

== Partisan Background ==
In the 2020 presidential election, Donald Trump won the most votes in 41 of North Dakota's State Senate districts and Democrat Joe Biden won 6. Out of the 24 districts with elections in 2024, Donald Trump won the most votes in 20 districts and Joe Biden won the most votes in 4. There are 2 Biden-won districts which Republicans represented going into the 2024 North Dakota Senate election: District 9 ( Biden + 21%) and Fargo-based District 46 ( Biden + 0.2%).

Biden 40–50% 50–60% 60–70% / Trump 40–50% 50–60% 60–70% 70–80% 80–90%

== Retirements ==
=== Democrats ===
1. District 44: Merrill Piepkorn is retiring to run for Governor.

=== Republicans ===
1. District 2: David Rust is retiring.
2. District 4: Jordan Kannianen is retiring.
3. District 6: Shawn Vedaa is retiring.
4. District 36: Jay Elkin is retiring.
5. District 40: Karen Krebsbach is retiring.
6. District 42: Curt Kreun is retiring.
7. District 46: Jim Roers is retiring.

== District Races ==
District	Incumbent	Party	First elected	Result	General election	Primary election candidates
2	David Rust	Republican	2014	Republican hold.	▌ ✓ Mark Enget; ▌Rosemary Tanberg	Democratic–NPL: ▌Rosemary Tanberg; Republican: ▌ ✓ Mark Enget; ▌Robert Harms
4	Jordan Kannianen	Republican	2016	Republican hold.	▌Chuck Walen	Republican: ▌Chuck Walen
6	Shawn Vedaa	Republican	2016	Republican hold.	▌ ✓ Paul Thomas; ▌Robert Tolar	Republican: ▌ ✓ Paul Thomas; ▌Zach Lessig
8	Jeffery Magrum	Republican	2016	Incumbent re-elected.	▌Jeffery Magrum (inc.)	Republican: ▌Jeffery Magrum (inc.)
9 (Note: Election for an unexpired 2-year term.)	Kent Weston (redistricted)	Republican	2022	Incumbent defeated. Democratic–NPL gain.	▌ ✓ Richard Marcellais; ▌Judy Estenson (inc.)	Democratic–NPL: ▌Richard Marcellais; Republican: ▌Judy Estenson (inc.)
10	Ryan Braunberger	Democratic-NPL	2022	Incumbent re-elected.	▌ ✓ Ryan Braunberger (inc.); ▌Curtis Olafson	Democratic–NPL: ▌Ryan Braunberger (inc.); Republican: ▌Curtis Olafson
12	Cole Conley	Republican	2020	Incumbent re-elected.	▌Olivia Schloegel; ▌ ✓ Cole Conley (inc.)	Democratic–NPL: ▌Olivia Schloegel; Republican: ▌Cole Conley (inc.)
14	Jerry Klein	Republican	1996	Incumbent re-elected.	▌Mark Nelson; ▌ ✓ Jerry Klein (inc.)	Democratic–NPL: ▌Mark Nelson; Republican: ▌ ✓ Jerry Klein (inc.); ▌Karisa Grothe
15	Judy Estenson (redistricted)	Republican	2022	Incumbent re-elected.	▌Kent Weston (inc.)	Republican: ▌Kent Weston (inc.)
16	David Clemens	Republican	2016	Incumbent re-elected.	▌Heather Tyulyandin; ▌ ✓ David Clemens (inc.)	Democratic–NPL: ▌Heather Tyulyandin; Republican: ▌David Clemens (inc.)
18	Scott Meyer	Republican	2016	Incumbent re-elected.	▌Kyle Thorson; ▌ ✓ Scott Meyer (inc.)	Democratic–NPL: ▌Kyle Thorson; Republican: ▌Scott Meyer (inc.)
20	Randy Lemm	Republican	2016	Incumbent re-elected.	▌Paul R. Hanson; ▌ ✓ Randy Lemm (inc.)	Democratic–NPL: ▌Paul R. Hanson; Republican: ▌Randy Lemm (inc.)
22	Mark Weber	Republican	2020	Incumbent re-elected.	▌Mark Weber (inc.)	Republican: ▌Mark Weber (inc.)
24	Michael Wobbema	Republican	2020	Incumbent re-elected.	▌Knut Gjovik; ▌ ✓ Michael Wobbema (inc.)	Democratic–NPL: ▌Knut Gjovik; Republican: ▌Michael Wobbema (inc.)
26	Dale Patten	Republican	2018	Incumbent re-elected.	▌Dale Patten (inc.)	Republican: ▌Dale Patten (inc.)
28	Robert Erbele	Republican	2000	Incumbeng re-elected.	▌Richard Schlosser; ▌ ✓ Robert Erbele (inc.)	Democratic–NPL: ▌Richard Schlosser; Republican: ▌Robert Erbele (inc.)
30	Diane Larson	Republican	2020	Incumbent re-elected.	▌Matthew Zimny; ▌ ✓ Diane Larson (inc.)	Democratic–NPL: ▌Matthew Zimny; Republican: ▌ ✓ Diane Larson (inc.); ▌Adam Rose
32	Dick Dever	Republican	2016	Incumbent re-elected.	▌Dick Dever (inc.)	Republican: ▌Dick Dever (inc.)
34	Justin Gerhardt	Republican	(appointed)	Incumbent re-elected.	▌Joshua Johnson; ▌ ✓ Justin Gerhardt (inc.)	Democratic–NPL: ▌Joshua Johnson; Republican: ▌Justin Gerhardt (inc.)
36	Jay Elkin	Republican	2018	Republican hold.	▌Desiree Van Oosting	Republican: ▌Desiree Van Oosting
38	David Hogue	Republican	2008	Incumbent re-elected.	▌David Hogue (inc.)	Republican: ▌David Hogue (inc.)
40	Karen Krebsbach	Republican	1988	Republican hold.	▌Jose L. Castaneda	Republican: ▌Jose L. Castaneda
42	Curt Kreun	Republican	2016	Republican hold.	▌Rodney Gigstad; ▌ ✓ Claire Cory	Democratic–NPL: ▌Rodney Gigstad; Republican: ▌ ✓ Claire Cory; ▌Dustin McNally
44	Merrill Piepkorn	Democratic–NPL	2016	Democratic–NPL hold.	▌Joshua Boschee	Democratic–NPL: ▌Joshua Boschee
46	Jim Roers	Republican	2016	Republican hold.	▌Jess Arneson; ▌ ✓ Michelle Powers	Democratic–NPL: ▌Jess Arneson; Republican: ▌Michelle Powers

Primary election results source:

General election results source:

== Detailed results ==
District 2 • District 4 • District 6 • District 8 • District 10 • District 12 • District 14 • District 16 • District 18 • District 20 • District 22 • District 24 • District 26 • District 28 • District 30 • District 32 • District 34 • District 36 • District 38 • District 40 • District 42 • District 44 • District 46

Primary election results source:

General election results source:

=== District 2 ===
2024 North Dakota Senate General Election, district 2
Party	Candidate	Votes	%
Republican	Mark Enget	6,615	84.86%
Democratic–NPL	Rosemary Tanberg	1,154	14.8%
Total votes		7,795	100%

=== District 4 ===
2024 North Dakota Senate General Election, district 4
Party	Candidate	Votes	%
Republican	Chuck Walen	5,599	96.57%
Total votes		5,798	100%

=== District 6 ===
2024 North Dakota Senate General Election, district 6
Party	Candidate	Votes	%
Republican	Paul Thomas	7,331	82.1%
Independent	Robert Tolar	1,533	17.17%
Total votes		8,929	100%

=== District 8 ===
2024 North Dakota Senate General Election, district 8
Party	Candidate	Votes	%
Republican	Jeffery Magrum	8,907	97.66%
Total votes		9,120	100%

=== District 9 ===
2024 North Dakota Senate General Election, district 9
Party	Candidate	Votes	%
Republican	Judy Estenson	2,134	38.56%
Democratic–NPL	Richard Marcellais	3,395	61.35%
Total votes		5,534	100%

=== District 10 ===
2024 North Dakota Senate General Election, district 10
Party	Candidate	Votes	%
Republican	George Roughead	2,955	49.00%
Democratic–NPL	Ryan Braunberger	3,064	50.81%
Total votes		6,030	100%

=== District 12 ===
2024 North Dakota Senate General Election, district 12
Party	Candidate	Votes	%
Republican	Cole Conley	4,417	66.79%
Democratic–NPL	Olivia Schloegel	2,183	33.01%
Total votes		6,613	100%

=== District 14 ===
2024 North Dakota Senate General Election, district 14
Party	Candidate	Votes	%
Republican	Jerry Klein	6,813	78.70%
Democratic–NPL	Mark Nelson	1,784	20.61%
Total votes		8,657	100%

=== District 15 ===
2024 North Dakota Senate General Election, district 15
Party	Candidate	Votes	%
Republican	Kent Weston	6,777	98.49%
Total votes		6,881	100%

=== District 16 ===
2024 North Dakota Senate General Election, district 16
Party	Candidate	Votes	%
Republican	David Clemens	4,898	61.55%
Democratic–NPL	Heather Tyulyandin	3,044	38.25%
Total votes		7,958	100%

=== District 18 ===
2024 North Dakota Senate General Election, district 18
Party	Candidate	Votes	%
Republican	Scott Meyer	3,492	53.95%
Democratic–NPL	Kyle Thorson	2,971	45.90%
Total votes		6,473	100%

=== District 20 ===
2024 North Dakota Senate General Election, district 20
Party	Candidate	Votes	%
Republican	Randy Lemm	6,151	70.92%
Democratic–NPL	John Pederson	2,505	28.88%
Total votes		8,673	100%

=== District 22 ===
2024 North Dakota Senate General Election, district 22
Party	Candidate	Votes	%
Republican	Mark F. Weber	8,547	97.57%
Total votes		8,760	100%

=== District 24 ===
2024 North Dakota Senate General Election, district 24
Party	Candidate	Votes	%
Republican	Michael Wobbema	5,047	64.86%
Democratic–NPL	Knut Gjovik	2,722	34.98%
Total votes		7,781	100%

=== District 26 ===
2024 North Dakota Senate General Election, district 26
Party	Candidate	Votes	%
Republican	Dale Patten	6,168	98.91%
Total votes		6,236	100%

=== District 28 ===
2024 North Dakota Senate General Election, district 28
Party	Candidate	Votes	%
Republican	Robert Erbele	6,528	74.49%
Democratic–NPL	Richard F. Schlosser	2,217	25.30%
Total votes		8,764	100%

=== District 30 ===
2024 North Dakota Senate General Election, district 30
Party	Candidate	Votes	%
Republican	Diane Larson	5,454	73.49%
Democratic–NPL	Matthew Zimny	1,921	25.89%
Total votes		7,421	100%

=== District 32 ===
2024 North Dakota Senate General Election, district 32
Party	Candidate	Votes	%
Republican	Dick Dever	6,141	96.62%
Total votes		6,356	100%

=== District 34 ===
2024 North Dakota Senate General Election, district 34
Party	Candidate	Votes	%
Republican	Justin Gerhardt	5,918	73.64%
Democratic–NPL	Joshua Johnson	2,101	26.14%
Total votes		8,036	100%

=== District 36 ===
2024 North Dakota Senate General Election, district 36
Party	Candidate	Votes	%
Republican	Desiree Van Oosting	6,314	99.12%
Total votes		6,370	100%

=== District 38 ===
2024 North Dakota Senate General Election, district 38
Party	Candidate	Votes	%
Republican	David Hogue	6,183	97.83%
Total votes		6,320	100%

=== District 40 ===
2024 North Dakota Senate General Election, district 40
Party	Candidate	Votes	%
Republican	Jose L. Castaneda	4,057	97.31%
Total votes		4,169	100%

=== District 42 ===
2024 North Dakota Senate General Election, district 42
Party	Candidate	Votes	%
Republican	Claire Cory	2,890	60.57%
Democratic–NPL	Rodney John Gigstad	1,867	39.13%
Total votes		4,771	100%

=== District 44 ===
2024 North Dakota Senate General Election, district 44
Party	Candidate	Votes	%
Democratic–NPL	Joshua Boschee	5,362	94.58%
Total votes		5,669	100%

=== District 46 ===
2024 North Dakota Senate General Election, district 46
Party	Candidate	Votes	%
Republican	Michelle Powers	5,102	54.49%
Democratic–NPL	Jess Arneson	4,242	45.31%
Total votes		9,363	100%
