= List of presidents pro tempore of the North Dakota Senate =

The following is a list of presidents pro tempore of the North Dakota Senate, a position that was created with the state's constitution in 1889. The term indicated is the year of the legislative session in which the individual served as president pro tempore.

#	Name	Term	Party	District
1	David S. Dodds	1889	Republican	17
2	Nahum B. Pinkham	1891	Republican	10
3	John H. Worst	1893	Republican	26
4	John E. Haggart	1895	Republican	9
5	Clarence B. Little	1897	Republican	27
6	Alexander C. McGillivray	1899	Republican	31
7	Judson LaMoure	1901	Republican	1
8	James B. Sharpe	1903	Republican	24
9	Frank S. Talcott	1905	Republican	11
10	John A. Regan	1907	Republican	33
11	Leslie A. Simpson	1909	Republican	31
12	Charles W. Plain	1911	Republican	40
13	Erland F. Gilbert	1913	Republican	10
14	Alfred Steele	1915	Republican	23
15	Henry McLean	1917	Republican	18
16	Richard McCarten	1919	Republican	13
17	Eric A. Bowman	1921	Republican	24
18	Frank E. Ployhar	1923	Republican	15
19	P. J. Murphy	1925	Republican	4
20	Walter Bond	1927	Republican	29
21	Ole H. Olson	1929	Republican	32
22	William H. Porter	1931	Republican	18
23	David H. Hamilton	1933	Republican	34
24	Albert S. Marshall	1935	Republican	25
25	Gust Wog	1937	Republican	39
26	William Watt	1939	Republican	11
27	Milton R. Young	1941	Republican-IVA	24
28	Clarence N. Brunsdale	1943	Republican-IVA	8
29	Everett H. Brant	1945	Republican	26
30	Jonathan L. Flatt	1947	Republican	14
31	Joseph B. Bridston	1949	Republican	7
32	Milton Rue	1951	Republican	27
33	Reinhold M. Streibel	1953	Republican-NPL	33
34	Oliver E. Bilden	1955	Republican-NPL	5
35	Emil Torno	1957	Republican	34
36	Amos Freed	1959	Republican	31
37	Arthur W. Luick	1961	Republican	12
38	Roland E. Meidinger	1963	Republican	23
39	George Saumur	1965	Republican	6
40	George Longmire	1967	Republican	18
41	Leland Roen	1969	Republican	39
42	Evan E. Lips	1971	Republican	32
43	Elton W. Ringsak	1973	Republican	16
44	Robert Melland	1975	Republican	29
45	Howard A. Freed	1977	Republican	37
46	Theron Strinden	1979	Republican	24
47	Stanley A. Wright	1981	Republican	4
48	Russell T. Thane	1983	Republican	25
49	Chester Reiten	1985	Republican	40
50	Rolland W. Redlin	1987	Democrat-NPL	40
51	Herschel Lashkowitz	1989	Democrat-NPL	21
52	Bonnie L. Heinrich	1991	Democrat-NPL	32
53	Corliss Mushik	1993	Democrat-NPL	34
54	Bryce S. Streibel	1995	Republican	14
55	Raymon F. Holmberg	1997	Republican	17
56	Layton Freborg	1999	Republican	8
57	Karen K. Krebsbach	2001	Republican	40
58	Herb Urlacher	2003	Republican	36
59	John Andrist	2005	Republican	2
60	Judy Lee	2007	Republican	13
61	Jerry Klein	2009	Republican	14
62	Rich Wardner	2011	Republican	37
63	Ralph Kilzer	2011-2013	Republican	47
64	Terry Wanzek	2013	Republican	29
65	Tim Flakoll	2013-2015	Republican	44
66	Dick Dever	2015-2017	Republican	32
67	Gary Lee	2017-2019	Republican	22
68	David Hogue	2019-2019	Republican	38
69	Oley Larsen	2019-2020	Republican	3
70	Randy Burckhard	2021-2021	Republican	5
71	Larry Luick	2021-2022	Republican	25
72	Donald Schaible	2023-2024	Republican	31
73	Brad Bekkedahl	2025	Republican	1
74	Kyle Davison	2025-present	Republican	1

== See also ==
- List of North Dakota Legislative Assemblies
