= 2014 United States House of Representatives election in North Dakota =

2014 United States House of Representatives election in North Dakota's at-large district
- November 4, 2014
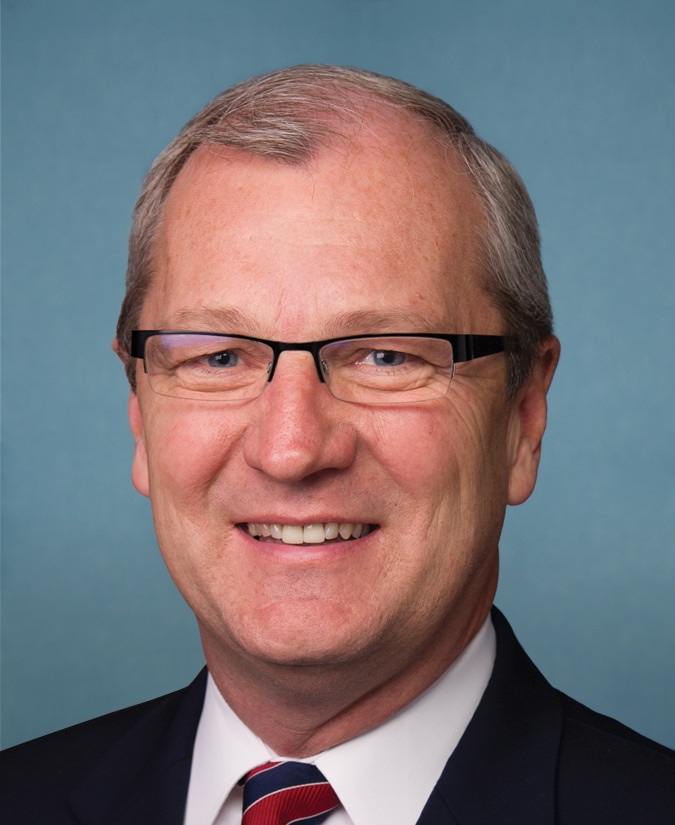

| Nominee | Kevin Cramer | George B. Sinner | Jack Seaman |
| Party | Republican | Democratic–NPL | Libertarian |
| Popular vote | 138,100 | 95,678 | 14,531 |
| Percentage | 55.54% | 38.48% | 5.84% |
- County results Cramer: 40–50% 50–60% 60–70% 70–80% Sinner: 40–50% 50–60% 60–70%
U.S. Representative before election
Kevin Cramer
Republican
Elected U.S. Representative
Kevin Cramer
Republican

The 2014 United States House of Representatives election in North Dakota was held on Tuesday, November 4, 2014, to elect the U.S. representative from North Dakota's at-large congressional district for the 114th United States Congress. The election coincided with all other states' House of Representatives elections. Incumbent Republican representative Kevin Cramer, who had served in the seat since 2013, won re-election to a second two-year term in office, becoming the first Republican U.S. Representative to be re-elected in North Dakota since 1978.

== Republican primary ==
=== Candidates ===
==== Declared ====
- Kevin Cramer, incumbent U.S. Representative

==== Withdrew ====
- DuWayne Hendrickson (did not make the ballot)

=== Results ===
Republican primary results
| Party | Candidate | Votes | % |
|---|---|---|---|
| Republican | Kevin Cramer | 50,188 | 99.70 |
| Republican | Write-in | 151 | 00.30 |
| Total votes | | 50,339 | 100 |

== Democratic-Nonpartisan League primary ==
=== Candidates ===
==== Declared ====
- George B. Sinner, state senator and son of former governor of North Dakota George A. Sinner

==== Declined ====
- Tom Fiebiger, former state senator
- Jasper Schneider, state director of the USDA Rural Development and former state representative
- Mac Schneider, Minority Leader of the North Dakota Senate
- Ryan Taylor, rancher, former Minority Leader of the North Dakota Senate and nominee for governor in 2012 (running for Agriculture Commissioner)

=== Results ===
Democratic primary results
| Party | Candidate | Votes | % |
|---|---|---|---|
| Democratic–NPL | George B. Sinner | 30,102 | 99.83 |
| Democratic–NPL | Write-in | 52 | 0.17 |
| Total votes | | 30,154 | 100 |

== Libertarian nomination ==
=== Candidates ===
==== Declared ====
- Jack Seaman, businessman

=== Results ===
Libertarian primary results
| Party | Candidate | Votes | % |
|---|---|---|---|
| Libertarian | Robert J. "Jack" Seaman | 1,548 | 99.55 |
| Libertarian | Write-in | 7 | 0.45 |
| Total votes | | 1,555 | 100 |

== General election ==
=== Predictions ===
| Source | Ranking | As of |
|---|---|---|
| The Cook Political Report | Likely R | November 3, 2014 |
| Rothenberg | Safe R | October 24, 2014 |
| Sabato's Crystal Ball | Likely R | October 30, 2014 |
| RCP | Safe R | November 2, 2014 |
| Daily Kos Elections | Likely R | November 4, 2014 |

=== Polling ===
| Poll source | Date(s) administered | Sample size | Margin of error | Kevin Cramer (R) | George B. Sinner (D-NPL) | Jack Seaman (L) | Undecided |
|---|---|---|---|---|---|---|---|
| DFM Research | October 13–16, 2014 | 430 | ± 4.7% | 46% | 39% | 3% | 12% |
| Forum Communications | September 26–October 3, 2014 | 505 | ± 5% | 46% | 27% | 4% | 23% |
| WPA Opinion Research (R-Cramer) | September 29–30, 2014 | 400 | ± 4.9% | 48% | 38% | — | 12% |
| The Mellman Group (D-Sinner) | September 20–22, 2014 | 400 | ± 4.9% | 38% | 40% | 5% | 17% |

=== Results ===
North Dakota's at-large congressional district, 2014
| Party | Candidate | Votes | % | ±% |
|---|---|---|---|---|
| Republican | Kevin Cramer (incumbent) | 138,100 | 55.54% | +0.67% |
| Democratic–NPL | George B. Sinner | 95,678 | 38.48% | −3.24% |
| Libertarian | Jack Seaman | 14,531 | 5.84% | +2.59% |
| n/a | Write-ins | 361 | 0.15% | −0.01% |
| Total votes | | 248,670 | 100.0% | N/A |
| Republican hold | | | | |

==== Counties that flipped from Democratic to Republican ====
- Foster (largest city: Carrington)
- Richland (largest city: Wahpeton)
