= Judy Lee =

American politician (born 1942)

President Pro Tempore of the North Dakota Senate
- In office December 4, 2006 – December 1, 2008
- Preceded by: John M. Andrist
- Succeeded by: Jerry Klein

Member of the North Dakota Senate from the 13th district
- Incumbent
- Assumed office December 6, 1994
- Preceded by: Jay Lindgren

Personal details
- Born: March 7, 1942 (age 84) Redding, California, U.S.
- Party: Republican
- Children: 2
- Education: University of North Dakota (BS)

Judy Lee (born March 7, 1942) is an American politician. She is a member of the North Dakota Senate from the 13th District.

== Political career ==
Lee was first elected as a Republican to the North Dakota Senate in 1994 to represent the 13th district, based in West Fargo. She is the Chair of the Human Services Committee, a standing member of the Political Subdivisions Committee, a procedural member of the Rules Committee, and an interim member of the Legislative Audit and Fiscal Review Committee. She served as the President Pro Tempore of the North Dakota State Senate during the 60th Legislative Assembly in 2007. Since 2015, the American Conservative Union has ranked Lee as the most moderate Republican in the North Dakota Senate.

In 2026, Lee faced a primary challenger from Phillip Sallberg, who was aligned with the populist right wing of the Republican Party. Lee, alongside her fellow moderate Republican counterparts in the House of Representatives, prevailed, with Lee receiving 57% of the vote.

== Personal life ==
Lee has a Bachelor of Science in Medical Technology from the University of North Dakota.
