= Mac Schneider =

American politician & lawyer (born 1979)

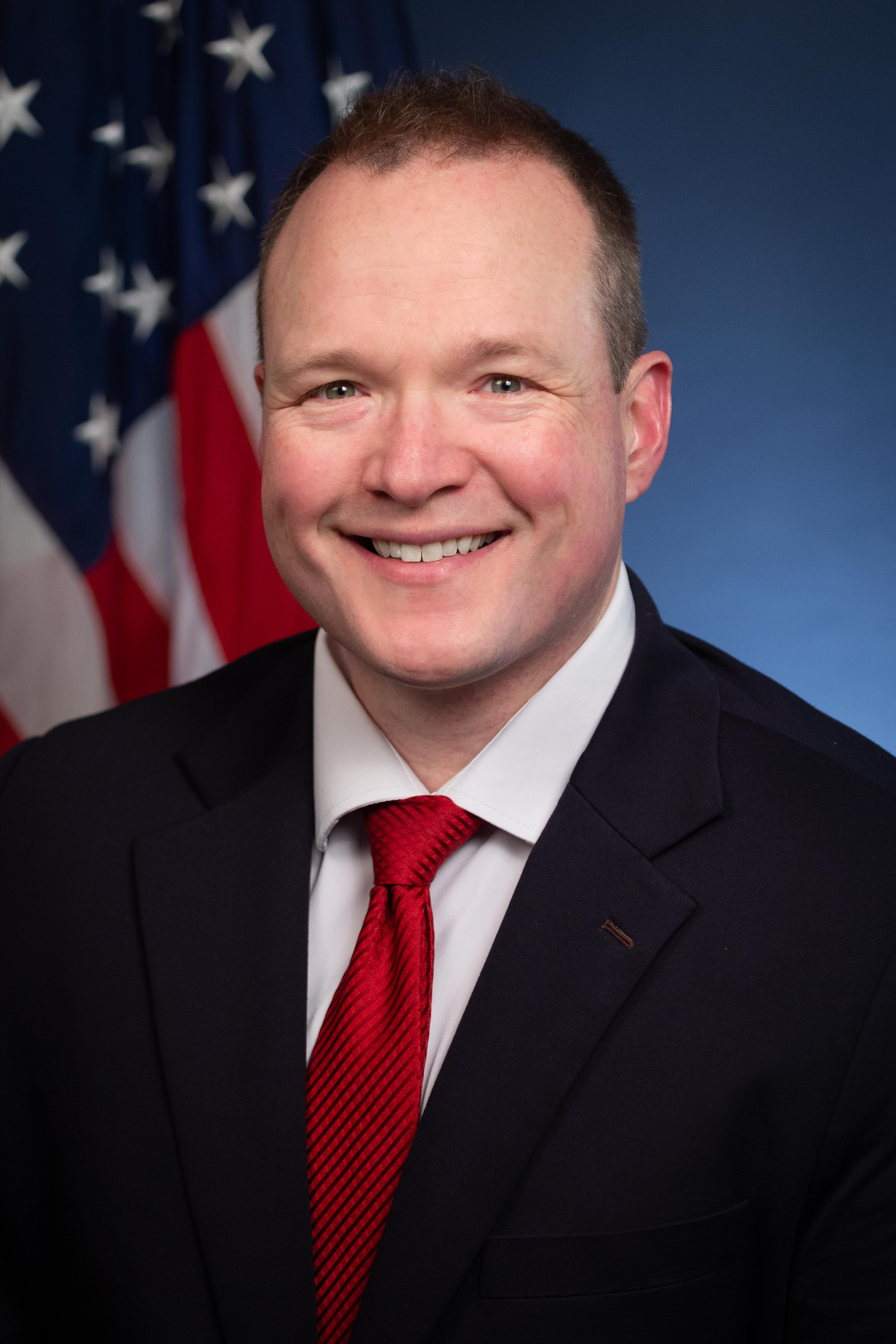

United States Attorney for the District of North Dakota
- In office December 12, 2022 – February 16, 2025
- President: Joe Biden; Donald Trump
- Preceded by: Drew Wrigley
- Succeeded by: Jennifer Puhl

Minority Leader of the North Dakota Senate
- In office January 8, 2013 – December 5, 2016
- Preceded by: Ryan Taylor
- Succeeded by: Joan Heckaman

Member of the North Dakota Senate from the 42nd district
- In office January 6, 2009 – December 5, 2016
- Preceded by: Nicholas Hacker
- Succeeded by: Curt Kreun

Personal details
- Born: McLain Joseph Schneider; March 27, 1979 (age 47) Fargo, North Dakota, U.S.
- Party: Democratic-NPL
- Spouse: Crystal Schneider
- Education: University of North Dakota (BA); Georgetown University (JD)

McLain Joseph "Mac" Schneider (born March 27, 1979) is an American attorney and politician who served as the United States attorney for the District of North Dakota from December 2022 to January 2025. He previously represented the 42nd district in the North Dakota Senate from 2009 until his reelection defeat in 2016. A member of the North Dakota Democratic-NPL Party, he served as the Senate Minority Leader from 2013 until the end of his Senate tenure. He was the Democratic-NPL endorsed candidate for the 2018 United States House of Representatives election in North Dakota.

== Early life and education ==
Schneider was born and raised in Fargo, North Dakota.

Schneider comes from a political family. His father, Mark, was the Democratic-NPL Party chairman in 2009; his mother, Mary, serves as a North Dakota State Representative from the 21st district; his uncle, John Schneider, is a former North Dakota state representative; and he campaigned for other Democratic state senators as a child.

Schneider graduated from Fargo South High School in 1997. In 2002, he received a degree in history from the University of North Dakota. Schneider was a starting center on UND's 2001 national championship football team and served as team captain his senior season. He graduated from Georgetown University with his Juris Doctor in 2008.

== North Dakota Senate ==
In 2008, Schneider was first elected to the North Dakota Senate from the 42nd district, which includes parts of northern Grand Forks and the University of North Dakota campus. He was reelected in 2012, and ran again in 2016, but lost to Republican Curt Kreun.

In the 2011 legislative session, he was elected to serve as Assistant Minority Leader of the North Dakota Senate, before serving as Minority Leader in the 2013 and 2015 legislative sessions.

Schneider's committee assignments during his tenure included the Standing Judiciary, Natural Resources, and Industry, Business, and Labor committees. He also served on the Interim Judiciary Committee, Budget Section Committee, Economic Impact Committee, Legislative Management Committee, and the Legislative Procedure and Arrangements Committee.

== 2018 congressional election ==
On March 6, 2018, Schneider announced his candidacy for that year's U.S. House of Representatives election for North Dakota's at-large congressional district. Schneider won the endorsement of the North Dakota Democratic-NPL Party at their 2018 state convention on March 17, 2018, defeating former state representative Ben W. Hanson and State Senator John Grabinger. Schneider was defeated in the general election by Republican Kelly Armstrong, who won 60% of the vote to Schneider's 36%.

== U.S. attorney ==
On September 15, 2022, President Joe Biden announced his intent to nominate Schneider to be the United States attorney for the District of North Dakota. The same day, his nomination was sent to the United States Senate.

On November 17, 2022, Schneider's nomination was reported of committee by a voice vote, with Senators Mike Lee, Josh Hawley, and Marsha Blackburn voting "no" on record. On December 6, 2022, his nomination was confirmed in the Senate by voice vote. He was sworn in on December 12, 2022.

On February 16, 2025, Schneider resigned from his office and his First Assistant Jennifer Puhl replaced him as acting secretary.

== Electoral history ==
2008 North Dakota Senate District 42 election
Party	Candidate	Votes	%
Democratic–NPL	Mac Schneider	3,499	56.4%
Republican	Nate Martindale	2,705	43.6%
Total votes		6,204	100.0%

2012 North Dakota Senate District 42 election
Party	Candidate	Votes	%
Democratic–NPL	Mac Schneider (inc.)	2,855	57.2%
Republican	Ross Lien	2,110	42.3%
Total votes		4,988	100.0%

2016 North Dakota Senate District 42 election
Party	Candidate	Votes	%
Republican	Curt Kreun	2,281	52.3%
Democratic–NPL	Mac Schneider (inc.)	2,073	47.5%
Total votes		4,365	100.0%

2018 North Dakota's at-large congressional district
Party	Candidate	Votes	%
Republican	Kelly Armstrong	193,568	60.20%
Democratic–NPL	Mac Schneider	114,377	35.57%
Independent	Charles Tuttle	13,066	4.06%
Write-in		521	0.16%
Total votes		321,532	100.0%

North Dakota Senate
Preceded by Ryan Taylor	Minority Leader of the North Dakota Senate; 2013–2016	Succeeded by Joan Heckaman
Legal offices
Preceded by Nick Chase; Acting	United States Attorney for the District of North Dakota; 2022–2025	Succeeded by Jennifer Puhl; Acting
