= 2018 United States House of Representatives election in North Dakota =

2018 United States House of Representatives election in North Dakota's at-large district
- November 6, 2018
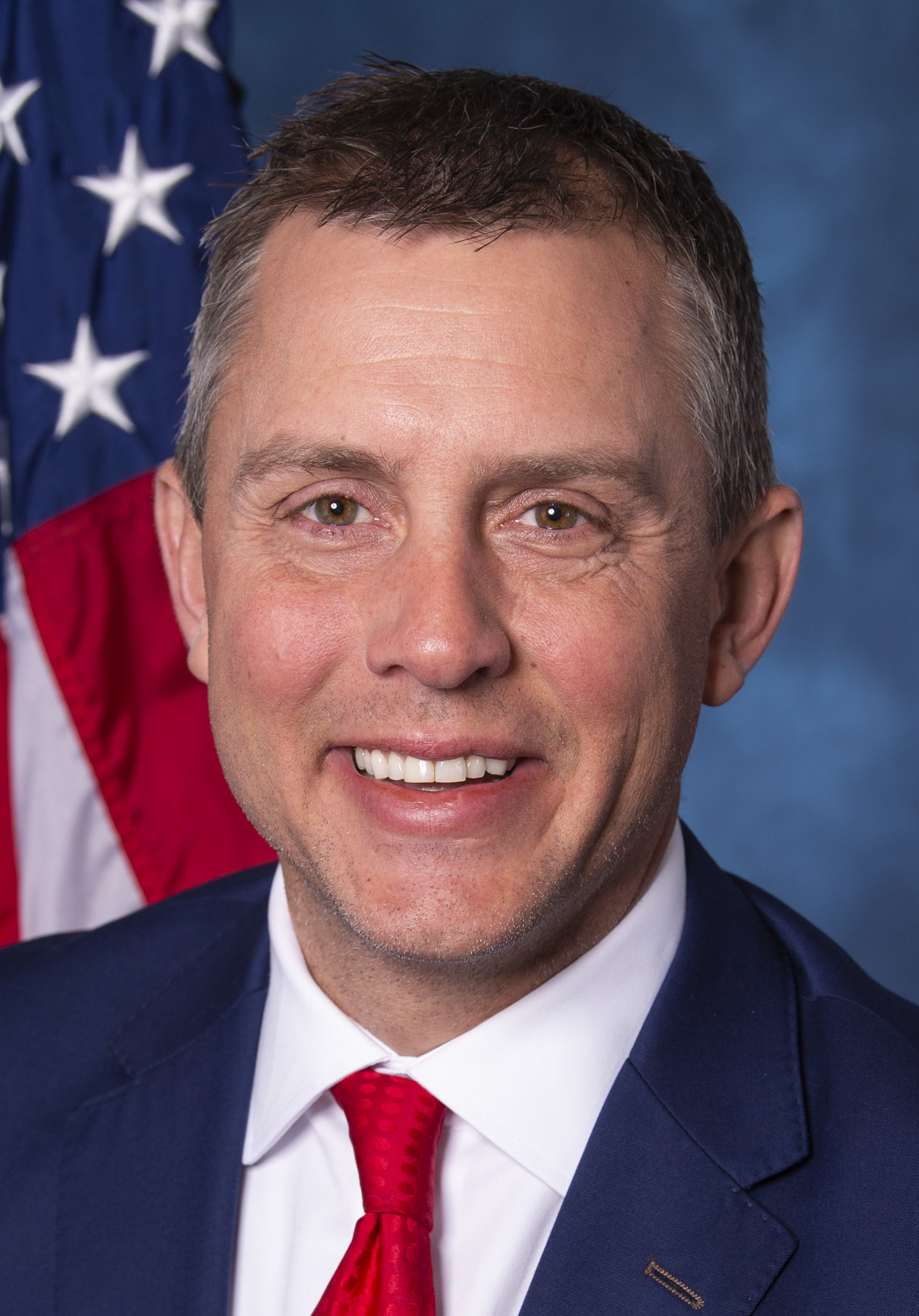

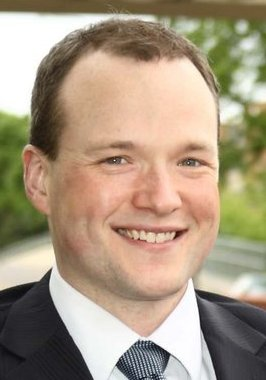
Nominee	Kelly Armstrong	Mac Schneider
Party	Republican	Democratic–NPL
Popular vote	193,568	114,377
Percentage	60.20%	35.57%
- County results Armstrong: 40–50% 50–60% 60–70% 70–80% 80–90% Schneider: 40–50% 50–60% 60–70%
U.S. Representative before election
Kevin Cramer
Republican
Elected U.S. Representative
Kelly Armstrong
Republican

The 2018 United States House of Representatives election in North Dakota was held on November 6, 2018, to elect the U.S. representative for North Dakota's at-large congressional district. The election coincided with the U.S. Senate election, as well as other statewide, legislative, and local elections.

Though incumbent Republican U.S. Representative Kevin Cramer announced on January 11, 2018 that he would run for re-election to a fourth term, he later expressed an intention to run for the United States Senate instead. On February 16, 2018, Cramer announced his Senate campaign.

== Republican primary ==
State Senator Tom Campbell stated that he intended to run for the U.S. Senate if Cramer ran for re-election, and to run for the U.S. House if Cramer did not run for re-election. Campbell declared for the seat following Cramer's run for Senate. However, on April 11, Campbell dropped out of the race to endorse Armstrong.

=== Candidates ===
==== Nominated ====
- Kelly Armstrong, state senator

==== Declared ====
- Tiffany Abentroth, U.S. Marine Corps veteran
- Paul Schaffner, oil field employee

==== Withdrew ====
- Tom Campbell, state senator

==== Declined ====
- Kevin Cramer, incumbent U.S. Representative (running for U.S. Senate)
- Gary Emineth, former chairman of the North Dakota Republican Party

=== Polling ===
Hypothetical polling

Poll source	Date(s) administered	Sample size	Margin of error	Tiffany Abentroth	Kelly Armstrong	Tom Campbell	Julie Fedorchak	DuWayne Hendrickson	Undecided
Gravis Marketing	February 21–24, 2018	385	± 5.0%	1%	13%	28%	9%	1%	47%

=== Results ===
Results by county: Armstrong—80–90% Armstrong—70–80% Armstrong—60–70% Armstrong—50–60% Armstrong—40–50% Abentroth—30–40%

Republican primary results
Party	Candidate	Votes	%
Republican	Kelly Armstrong	37,054	56.23
Republican	Tom Campbell (withdrawn)	17,692	26.85
Republican	Tiffany Abentroth	5,877	8.92
Republican	Paul Schaffner	5,203	7.90
Republican	Write-Ins	75	0.11
Total votes		65,901	100.00

== Democratic-NPL primary ==
The Democratic-NPL Party held their state convention on March 16 and 17, during which delegates voted to endorse Mac Schneider. Although general election ballot access was actually controlled by a primary election to be held June 12, both other candidates decided to withdraw from the race, rather than challenge Schneider in the primary.

=== Candidates ===
==== Endorsed ====
- Mac Schneider, former Minority Leader of the North Dakota Senate

==== Withdrawn ====
- John Grabinger, state senator
- Ben Hanson, former state representative

=== Results ===
Results by county: Schneider—100% Schneider—≥90%

Democratic primary results
Party	Candidate	Votes	%
Democratic–NPL	Mac Schneider	33,545	99.78
Democratic–NPL	Write-Ins	74	0.22
Total votes		33,619	100.00

== General election ==
=== Predictions ===
Source	Ranking	As of
The Cook Political Report	Solid R	June 1, 2018
The Rothenberg Political Report	Solid R	June 1, 2018
Sabato's Crystal Ball	Safe R	June 6, 2018

=== Debates ===
Host network/sponsors	Date	Link(s)	Participants	
Host network/sponsors	Date	Link(s)	Mac Schneider (D)	Kelly Armstrong (R)
KFYR-TV	August 16, 2018		Invited	Invited
Prairie Public	September 11, 2018		Invited	Invited
KFGO	September 19, 2018		Invited	Invited

=== Polling ===
Poll source	Date(s) administered	Sample size	Margin of error	Kelly Armstrong (R)	Mac Schneider (D)	Other	Undecided
FOX News	October 27–30, 2018	789 LV	± 3.0%	55%	33%	2%	10%
FOX News	October 27–30, 2018	851 RV	± 3.0%	52%	32%	3%	12%
Strategic Research Associates	October 12–19, 2018	650	± 3.8%	56%	35%	–	9%
FOX News	September 29 – October 2, 2018	704 LV	± 3.5%	51%	34%	2%	12%
FOX News	September 29 – October 2, 2018	801 V	± 3.5%	49%	33%	2%	14%
Strategic Research Associates	September 17–27, 2018	650	± 3.8%	55%	31%	–	14%
FOX News	September 8–11, 2018	701 LV	± 3.5%	48%	34%	2%	15%
FOX News	September 8–11, 2018	804 V	± 3.5%	47%	32%	2%	17%
Axis Research (R-Armstrong)	August 26–28, 2018	506	± 4.5%	53%	32%	–	15%
Mason-Dixon	June 13–15, 2018	625	± 4.0%	46%	35%	–	19%
Axis Research (R-Armstrong)	May 13–14, 2018	509	± 4.5%	48%	26%	–	26%

=== Results ===
North Dakota's at-large congressional district, 2018
Party	Candidate	Votes	%	±%
Republican	Kelly Armstrong	193,568	60.20%	−8.93%
Democratic–NPL	Mac Schneider	114,377	35.57%	+11.82%
Independent	Charles Tuttle	13,066	4.06%	N/A
n/a	Write-ins	521	0.16%	N/A
Total votes		321,532	100.00%	N/A
Republican hold				

==== By county ====
County	Kelly Armstrong Republican		Mac Schneider Democratic-NPL		All others		Margin		Total
County	#	%	#	%	#	%	#	%	Total
Adams	878	75.8%	236	20.4%	44	3.8%	642	55.4%	1,158
Barnes	2,785	55.9%	1,992	40.0%	208	4.1%	793	15.9%	4,985
Benson	909	40.5%	1,225	54.6%	109	4.9%	-316	-14.1%	2,243
Billings	469	82.9%	76	13.4%	21	3.7%	393	69.5%	566
Bottineau	2,316	71.2%	806	24.8%	132	4.0%	1,510	46.4%	3,254
Bowman	1,331	81.3%	253	15.4%	54	3.3%	1,078	65.9%	1,638
Burke	779	81.6%	151	15.8%	25	2.6%	628	65.8%	955
Burleigh	30,977	68.2%	12,623	27.8%	1,846	4.0%	18,354	40.4%	45,446
Cass	35,255	46.3%	37,664	49.4%	3,270	4.3%	-2,409	-3.1%	76,189
Cavalier	1,216	63.1%	643	33.4%	68	3.5%	573	29.7%	1,927
Dickey	1,375	63.8%	718	33.3%	61	2.8%	657	30.5%	2,154
Divide	859	71.9%	290	24.3%	45	3.8%	569	47.6%	1,194
Dunn	1,603	79.2%	379	18.7%	43	2.1%	1,224	60.5%	2,025
Eddy	718	58.6%	459	37.4%	49	4.0%	259	21.2%	1,226
Emmons	1,508	82.6%	262	14.3%	56	4.0%	1,246	68.3%	1,826
Foster	1,132	69.1%	450	27.5%	57	3.4%	682	41.6%	1,639
Golden Valley	721	82.8%	123	14.1%	27	3.1%	598	68.7%	871
Grand Forks	13,137	47.9%	12,293	48.5%	1,007	3.6%	-156	-0.6%	27,437
Grant	1,011	80.0%	210	16.6%	43	3.4%	801	63.4%	1,264
Griggs	782	64.3%	407	33.5%	27	2.2%	375	30.8%	1,216
Hettinger	1,055	82.8%	184	14.4%	35	2.8%	871	68.4%	1,274
Kidder	989	77.2%	235	18.3%	57	4.5%	754	58.9%	1,281
LaMoure	1,307	64.0%	674	33.0%	62	3.0%	633	31.0%	2,043
Logan	795	81.0%	157	16.0%	29	3.0%	638	65.0%	981
McHenry	1,797	70.6%	624	24.5%	126	4.9%	1,173	45.9%	2,547
McIntosh	1,098	75.9%	297	20.5%	52	3.6%	801	55.4%	1,447
McKenzie	3,158	76.6%	812	19.7%	152	3.7%	2,346	56.9%	4,122
McLean	3,498	69.9%	1,307	26.1%	198	4.0%	2,191	43.8%	5,003
Mercer	3,040	77.1%	746	18.9%	157	4.0%	2,294	58.2%	3,943
Morton	10,240	69.6%	3,742	25.4%	725	5.0%	6,498	44.2%	14,707
Mountrail	2,348	62.1%	1,286	34.0%	147	3.9%	1,062	28.1%	3,781
Nelson	879	54.3%	690	42.6%	51	3.1%	189	11.7%	1,620
Oliver	772	79.8%	152	15.7%	44	4.5%	620	64.1%	968
Pembina	1,876	64.1%	963	32.9%	88	3.0%	913	31.2%	2,927
Pierce	1,297	68.3%	541	28.5%	61	3.2%	756	39.8%	1,899
Ramsey	2,854	57.0%	1,919	38.3%	236	4.7%	935	18.7%	5,009
Ransom	1,072	46.9%	1,107	48.4%	107	4.7%	-35	-1.5%	2,286
Renville	913	76.4%	220	18.4%	62	5.2%	693	58.0%	1,195
Richland	3,853	54.0%	2,957	41.4%	326	4.6%	896	12.6%	7,136
Rolette	1,292	26.3%	3,327	67.7%	296	6.0%	-2,035	-41.4%	4,015
Sargent	962	48.7%	931	47.1%	84	4.2%	31	1.6%	1,977
Sheridan	635	80.6%	115	14.6%	38	4.8%	520	66.0%	788
Sioux	315	22.3%	984	69.7%	112	8.0%	-669	-47.4%	1,411
Slope	319	83.5%	53	13.9%	10	2.6%	266	69.6%	382
Stark	9,774	80.5%	1,946	16.0%	428	3.5%	7,828	64.5%	12,148
Steele	461	48.2%	465	48.6%	31	3.2%	-4	-0.4%	957
Stutsman	5,784	62.3%	3,110	33.5%	395	4.2%	2,674	28.8%	9,289
Towner	666	59.6%	413	36.9%	39	3.5%	253	22.7%	1,118
Traill	1,944	52.5%	1,610	43.5%	147	4.0%	334	9.0%	3,701
Walsh	2,723	60.9%	1,580	35.3%	170	3.8%	1,143	25.6%	4,473
Ward	16,046	67.5%	6,418	27.0%	1,322	5.5%	9,628	40.5%	23,786
Wells	1,652	74.5%	476	21.5%	89	4.0%	1,176	53.0%	2,217
Williams	8,393	76.4%	2,074	18.9%	519	4.8%	6,319	57.5%	10,986
Totals	193,568	60.2%	114,377	35.6%	13,587	4.2%	79,191	24.6%	321,532

Counties that flipped from Republican to Democratic

- Cass (largest city: Fargo)
- Grand Forks (largest city: Grand Forks)
- Benson (largest CDP: Fort Totten)
- Ransom (largest city: Lisbon)
- Steele (largest city: Finley)
