= Osland =

Osland is a surname, and may refer to:

- Arne Osland (born 1942), American politician
- Einar Osland (1886–1955), Norwegian politician
- Erna Osland (born 1951), Norwegian teacher and author of children's literature
- Les Osland (1921–1993), Canadian politician
- Paul Osland (born 1964), Canadian runner
- Per Osland, Norwegian physicist
