= John Warner (North Dakota politician) =

American politician

Member of the North Dakota Senate from the 4th district
- In office December 1, 2003 – December 1, 2016
- Succeeded by: Jordan Kannianen

Personal details
- Born: June 28, 1952 (age 74) Minot, North Dakota
- Party: North Dakota Democratic-NPL Party
- Spouse: Janice
- Education: North Dakota State University, Minot State University
- Profession: Farmer

John M. Warner is member of the North Dakota Democratic-NPL Party who represented the 4th district in the North Dakota Senate from 2003 to 2016. He was previously a member of the North Dakota House of Representatives from 1997 through 2003.
