= Bill Bowman (American politician) =

American politician (1946–2020)

Member of the North Dakota Senate from the 39th district
- In office December 1, 1990 – December 1, 2018
- Succeeded by: Dale Patten

Personal details
- Born: May 26, 1946 Baker, Montana
- Died: August 15, 2020 (aged 74) Bowman, North Dakota
- Party: Republican
- Education: Dickinson State University (BBA)

Bill Bowman (May 26, 1946 – August 15, 2020) was an American politician and businessman who served as a member of the North Dakota State Senate from 1990 until 2018.

== Early life and education ==
Bowman was born in Baker, Montana and raised on his parents' ranch in Slope County, North Dakota.

Bowman briefly attended Dickinson State University, but left to serve in the United States Army. While Bowman was awaiting deployment to Vietnam in Hawaii, his father died in a farming accident. Bowman received a hardship discharged and returned to North Dakota, where he helped his mother operate the family's ranch. His mother encouraged him to return to Dickinson State University, where Bowman played on the football team and earned a bachelor's degree in business. During his time at Dickinson State, Bowman also became friends with Rich Wardner, with whom he later served in the North Dakota Senate.

== Career ==
During his career, Bowman worked as an auctioneer, rancher, farmer, and served on the Bowman County Commission. In 1989, Bowman was selected to serve as vice chairman of the Republican Party in the 39th district.

=== North Dakota Senate ===
In 1990, Bowman received the Republican nomination to run for a seat in the North Dakota Senate from the 39th district. He defeated incumbent Democratic Senator Rich Maixner.

On January 8, 1991, Bowman was appointed to the Human services, and Agriculture Senate committees.

== Personal life ==
Bowman was a resident of Bowman, North Dakota. He died on August 15, 2020. He was 74 years old.

Party political offices
Preceded by Keith Bjerke	Republican nominee for North Dakota Agriculture Commissioner; 1992	Succeeded by Dina Butcher
