= Tyler Axness =

American politician (born 1987)

Member of the North Dakota Senate from the 16th district
- In office January 2013 – December 2016
- Preceded by: Joe Miller
- Succeeded by: David Clemens

Personal details
- Born: Tyler Steven Axness; 1987 (age 38–39)
- Party: Democratic-NPL
- Education: North Dakota State University
- Profession: Policy coordinator

Tyler Steven Axness (born 1987) is an American talk radio host and former politician. A member of the North Dakota Democratic–Nonpartisan League Party, he served in the North Dakota Senate for the 16th district from 2013 to 2016.

== Politics and early career ==
Axness was a North Dakota Democratic-NPL State Senator who represented North Dakota's 16th legislative district in the North Dakota Senate from 2013 to 2016. Axness had previously served as the communication and policy coordinator of the Freedom Resource Center.

== Radio ==
Axness hosts Afternoons Live with Tyler Axness on KFGO radio. The show airs for three hours on weekday afternoons.

== NDxPlains.com ==
Axness is the creator of and writer for NDxPlains.com, a politically focused news website and social media platform that covers issues and events that affect North Dakota on a statewide and national scale.
