= Hank Weber =

American politician (1924–2022)

Member of the North Dakota House of Representatives from the 22nd district
- In office 1963–1964
- In office 1967–1980

Member of the North Dakota Senate
- In office 1965–1966

Personal details
- Born: December 26, 1924 Wheatland, North Dakota, U.S.
- Died: October 27, 2022 (aged 97)
- Party: Democratic-NPL
- Spouse(s): Dona Aasgaard (m. 1955–2008; her death)
- Children: 2 (including Mark)
- Profession: farmer, rancher

Francis Edward Weber (December 26, 1924 – October 27, 2022), better known as Hank Weber, was an American politician who was a member of the North Dakota House of Representatives. He represented the 22nd district from 1963 to 1964 and 1967 to 1980 as a member of the Democratic party. He also served a term in the North Dakota State Senate from 1965 to 1966. He was Assistant Minority Leader of the house from 1971 to 1973. An alumnus of Valley City State University, he was a farmer.

Weber died on October 27, 2022, at the age of 97.
