= Senator Rust =

Senator Rust may refer to:

- David Rust (born 1945), North Dakota State Senate
- William A. Rust (1844–1903), Wisconsin State Senate
