= Walen (surname) =

Walen is a Dutch surname usually found in Belgium, and means 'Walloon' indicating someone who came from Wallonia or someone of Wallonian descent. In Netherlands; the name may have derived from the Scandinavian name Valen. Notable people with the surname include:

- Amy Walen (born 1967), American politician
- Alec Walen (born 1965), American academic (philosophy and law)
- Chuck Walen, American politician
- Mark Walen (born 1963), American football player
