= Bernie Satrom =

American businessman and politician

Member of the North Dakota House of Representatives

Member of the U.S. House of Representatives from 's 12th district
- In office 2016–Present

Personal details
- Party: Republican

Bernie Satrom is an American businessman and politician. He is a member of the North Dakota House of Representatives for the 12th district. He is a member of the Republican Party.

Satrom owns a business that builds churches. He was the Republican nominee for the North Dakota Senate in 2012, but lost to John Grabinger. Satrom was elected to the State House in 2016.

In 2017, while defending North Dakota's blue laws, Satrom argued that under the system, women should bring their husbands breakfast in bed on Sundays.

Satrom is from Jamestown, North Dakota.
