= Constance Triplett =

American politician

Member of the North Dakota Senate from the 18th district
- In office 2003 – December 2016
- Succeeded by: Scott Meyer

Personal details
- Party: North Dakota Democratic-Nonpartisan League Party

Constance Triplett is an American politician who served as a member of the North Dakota State Senate for the 18th district, from 2003 to 2016. She is a member of the North Dakota Democratic-Nonpartisan League Party.
