= Petersburg, North Dakota =

- City
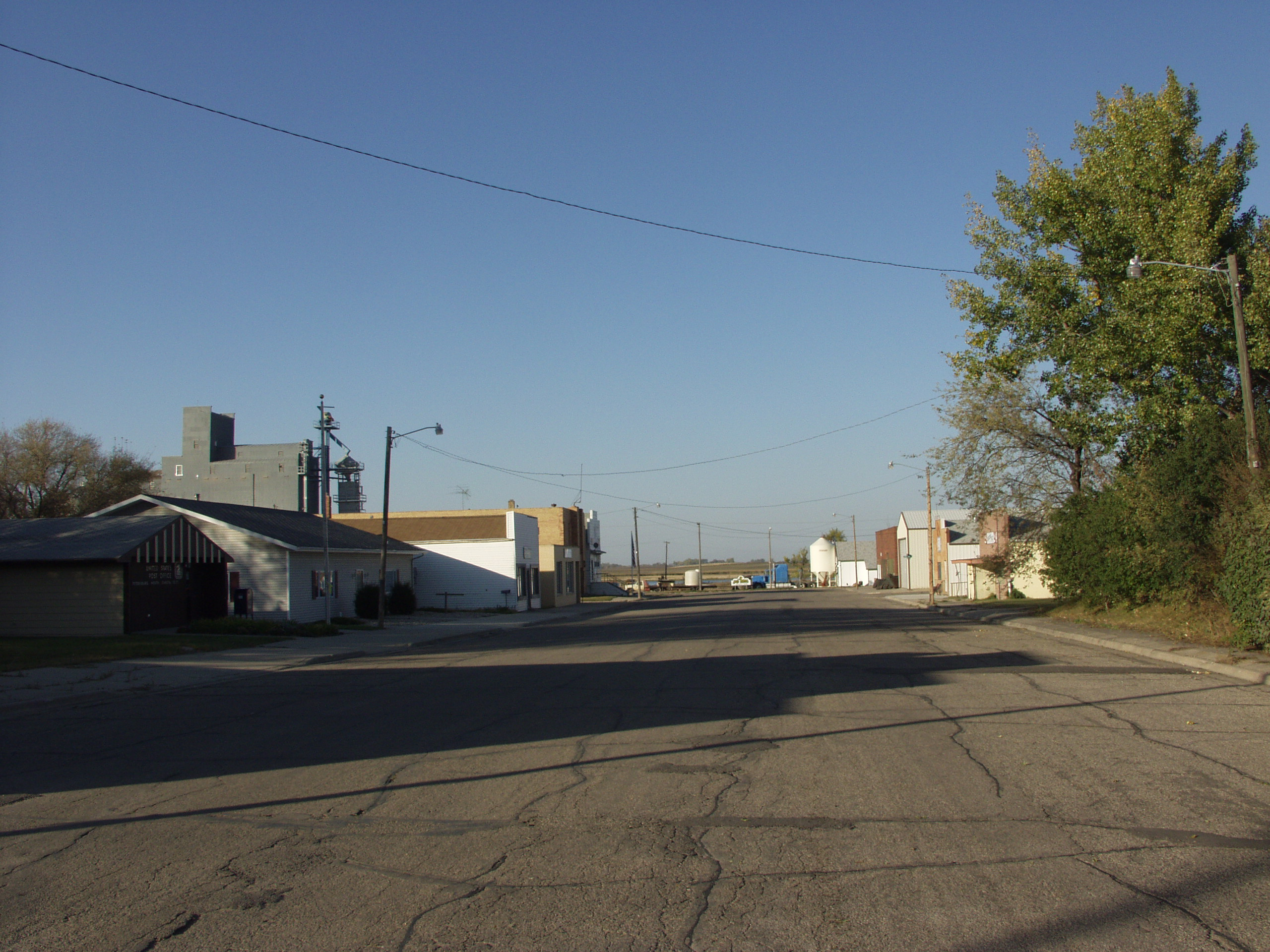
- Looking down a street in Petersburg

- Location of Petersburg, North Dakota
- Coordinates: 48°00′47″N 98°00′01″W
- Country: United States
- State: North Dakota
- County: Nelson
- Founded: 1884

Area
  - Total: 1.04 sq mi (2.69 km^{2})
  - Land: 1.03 sq mi (2.66 km^{2})
  - Water: 0.012 sq mi (0.03 km^{2})
- Elevation: 1,526 ft (465 m)

Population (2020)
  - Total: 162
  - Estimate (2022): 160
  - Density: 157.5/sq mi (60.82/km^{2})
- Time zone: UTC-6 (Central (CST))
  - Summer (DST): UTC-5 (CDT)
- ZIP code: 58272
- Area code: 701
- FIPS code: 38-61860
- GNIS feature ID: 1036218

Petersburg is a city in Nelson County, North Dakota, United States. The population was 162 at the time of the 2020 census.

== History ==
Petersburg was founded in 1884. Politician Martin N. Johnson and neighbor Levi H. Peterson owned land along the Great Northern Railway and decided to form a townsite. The two men flipped a coin to determine who got naming rights. Peterson won the coin flip, selecting the name Petersburg, presumably after himself.

== Geography ==
According to the United States Census Bureau, the city has a total area of 1.04 square miles (2.69 km^{2}), of which 1.03 square miles (2.67 km^{2}) is land and 0.01 square miles (0.03 km^{2}) is water.

=== Climate ===
This climatic region is typified by large seasonal temperature differences, with warm to hot (and often humid) summers and cold (sometimes severely cold) winters. According to the Köppen Climate Classification system, Petersburg has a humid continental climate, abbreviated "Dfb" on climate maps.

Climate data for Petersburg 2 N, North Dakota (1991–2020 normals, extremes 1944–present)
Month	Jan	Feb	Mar	Apr	May	Jun	Jul	Aug	Sep	Oct	Nov	Dec	Year
Record high °F (°C)	50 (10)	62 (17)	79 (26)	98 (37)	96 (36)	103 (39)	100 (38)	102 (39)	102 (39)	92 (33)	75 (24)	57 (14)	103 (39)
Mean daily maximum °F (°C)	13.7 (−10.2)	18.6 (−7.4)	31.3 (−0.4)	49.7 (9.8)	64.9 (18.3)	74.3 (23.5)	78.9 (26.1)	78.3 (25.7)	68.9 (20.5)	52.3 (11.3)	34.0 (1.1)	19.9 (−6.7)	48.7 (9.3)
Daily mean °F (°C)	4.8 (−15.1)	9.0 (−12.8)	22.2 (−5.4)	39.0 (3.9)	53.4 (11.9)	63.7 (17.6)	68.2 (20.1)	66.6 (19.2)	57.0 (13.9)	42.0 (5.6)	25.6 (−3.6)	11.8 (−11.2)	38.6 (3.7)
Mean daily minimum °F (°C)	−4.2 (−20.1)	−0.7 (−18.2)	13.2 (−10.4)	28.4 (−2.0)	41.9 (5.5)	53.1 (11.7)	57.5 (14.2)	54.9 (12.7)	45.2 (7.3)	31.7 (−0.2)	17.1 (−8.3)	3.6 (−15.8)	28.5 (−1.9)
Record low °F (°C)	−42 (−41)	−44 (−42)	−34 (−37)	−12 (−24)	5 (−15)	28 (−2)	30 (−1)	25 (−4)	15 (−9)	−1 (−18)	−25 (−32)	−39 (−39)	−44 (−42)
Average precipitation inches (mm)	0.44 (11)	0.45 (11)	0.50 (13)	0.94 (24)	2.79 (71)	3.84 (98)	3.61 (92)	2.51 (64)	2.12 (54)	1.66 (42)	0.73 (19)	0.64 (16)	20.23 (514)
Average snowfall inches (cm)	6.3 (16)	7.7 (20)	7.7 (20)	2.2 (5.6)	0.6 (1.5)	0.0 (0.0)	0.0 (0.0)	0.0 (0.0)	0.0 (0.0)	2.2 (5.6)	4.9 (12)	10.9 (28)	42.5 (108)
Average precipitation days (≥ 0.01 in)	3.5	3.6	3.4	4.6	8.8	9.8	8.7	7.4	6.5	6.5	4.0	3.9	70.7
Average snowy days (≥ 0.1 in)	3.3	3.5	3.2	1.0	0.2	0.0	0.0	0.0	0.0	0.9	3.2	3.8	19.1
Source: NOAA

== Demographics ==
Historical population
Census	Pop.	Note	%±
1910	353		—
1920	367		4.0%
1930	310		−15.5%
1940	285		−8.1%
1950	318		11.6%
1960	272		−14.5%
1970	266		−2.2%
1980	230		−13.5%
1990	219		−4.8%
2000	195		−11.0%
2010	192		−1.5%
2020	162		−15.6%
2022 (est.)	160		−1.2%
U.S. Decennial Census; 2020 Census

=== 2010 census ===
As of the census of 2010, there were 192 people, 78 households, and 58 families residing in the city. The population density was 186.4 inhabitants per square mile (72.0/km^{2}). There were 99 housing units at an average density of 96.1 per square mile (37.1/km^{2}). The racial makeup of the city was 97.4% White, 0.5% African American, 1.0% Native American, 0.5% Asian, and 0.5% from two or more races. Hispanic or Latino of any race were 2.6% of the population.

There were 78 households, of which 33.3% had children under the age of 18 living with them, 57.7% were married couples living together, 7.7% had a female householder with no husband present, 9.0% had a male householder with no wife present, and 25.6% were non-families. 21.8% of all households were made up of individuals, and 14.1% had someone living alone who was 65 years of age or older. The average household size was 2.46 and the average family size was 2.81.

The median age in the city was 41 years. 24% of residents were under the age of 18; 5.8% were between the ages of 18 and 24; 21.4% were from 25 to 44; 30.3% were from 45 to 64; and 18.8% were 65 years of age or older. The gender makeup of the city was 49.0% male and 51.0% female.

=== 2000 census ===
As of the census of 2000, there were 195 people, 82 households, and 51 families residing in the city. The population density was 189.0 inhabitants per square mile (73.0/km^{2}). There were 106 housing units at an average density of 102.7 per square mile (39.7/km^{2}). The racial makeup of the city was 96.92% White, 0.51% African American, 0.51% Native American, 1.03% from other races, and 1.03% from two or more races. Hispanic or Latino of any race were 1.54% of the population.

There were 82 households, out of which 28.0% had children under the age of 18 living with them, 58.5% were married couples living together, 3.7% had a female householder with no husband present, and 37.8% were non-families. 36.6% of all households were made up of individuals, and 23.2% had someone living alone who was 65 years of age or older. The average household size was 2.38 and the average family size was 3.14.

In the city, the population was spread out, with 27.2% under the age of 18, 3.6% from 18 to 24, 25.6% from 25 to 44, 20.0% from 45 to 64, and 23.6% who were 65 years of age or older. The median age was 42 years. For every 100 females, there were 93.1 males. For every 100 females age 18 and over, there were 97.2 males.

The median income for a household in the city was $37,679, and the median income for a family was $42,750. Males had a median income of $30,250 versus $21,250 for females. The per capita income for the city was $17,634. About 4.6% of families and 6.1% of the population were below the poverty line, including none of those under the age of eighteen and 11.9% of those 65 or over.

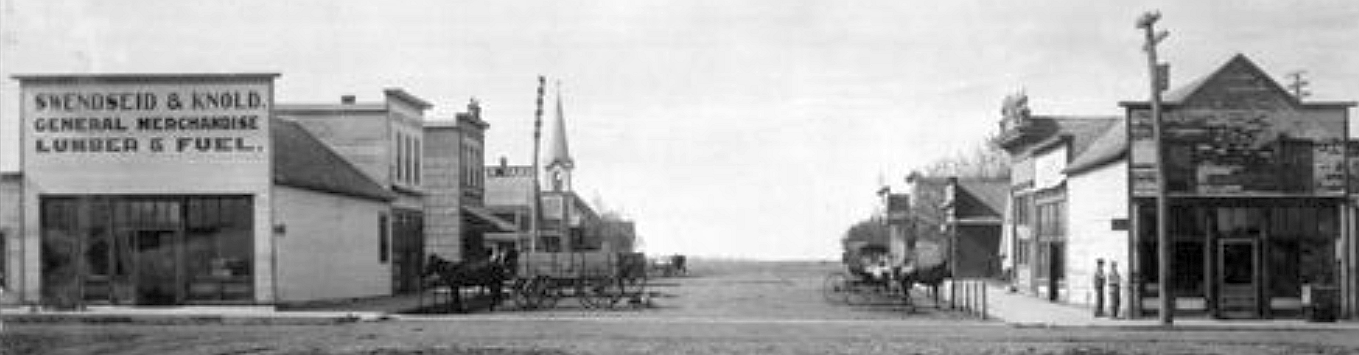
5th Street in Petersburg, circa 1907-1909

== Transportation ==
Amtrak’s Empire Builder, which operates between Seattle/Portland and Chicago, passes through the town on BNSF tracks, but makes no stop. The nearest station is located in Devils Lake, 43 miles (69 km) to the northwest.

== Notable people ==
- Martin N. Johnson, U.S. Congressman and Senator; buried in town
- Scott Meyer, member of the North Dakota Senate
