= Shannon Roers Jones =

American attorney and politician

Member of the North Dakota House of Representatives from the 46th district
- In office December 1, 2016 – December 1, 2024
- Preceded by: Kathy Hawken
- Succeeded by: Desiree Morton

Personal details
- Born: Fargo, North Dakota, U.S.
- Party: Republican
- Children: 3
- Parent: Jim Roers (father)
- Education: College of St. Benedict (BA); University of St. Thomas (MBA); University of North Dakota (JD)

Shannon Roers Jones is an American attorney and politician. She served in the North Dakota House of Representatives from the 46th district from 2016-2024. She was the North Dakota House Republican Caucus Chairperson from 2019 to 2021.

== Early life and education ==
Roers Jones was born to Debby and Jim Roers in Fargo, North Dakota and lived in Horace for most of her early life. Her father is CEO of Roers Construction, a company he formed in 1976. She studied business in college, earning a Bachelor of Arts from the College of St. Benedict in 1999 and an MBA from University of St. Thomas in 2001. She then earned a Juris Doctor from University of North Dakota School of Law in 2011.

== Career ==
Roers Jones started her career working for multiple construction firms and in the real estate industry. After law school, she began working as a real estate Attorney as well as the main attorney in her father's business.

== Electoral history ==
Roers Jones first ran for office in 2016, when she ran for the house seat for district 46 as the Republican successor to retiring incumbent Kathy Hawken. She won with 28.64% of the vote.

2020 General Election for North Dakota House of Representatives District 46
Party	Candidate	Votes	%	±%
Republican	Shannon Roers Jones (incumbent)	3,974	27.77%	−0.87
Republican	James Kasper (incumbent)	3,632	25.38%	−0,44
Democratic	Ben M Hanson	3,349	23.40%	N/A
Democratic	Ben W Hanson	3,346	23.38%	N/A
Other	Write-ins	11	0.08%	N/A
Total votes		14,312	100.0%	N/A
Republican hold				

2016 General Election for North Dakota House of Representatives District 46
Party	Candidate	Votes	%	±%
Republican	Shannon Roers Jones	3,732	28.59%	N/A
Republican	James Kasper (incumbent)	3,364	25.77%	−2,42
Democratic	Kiersten Diederich	3,137	24.03%	N/A
Democratic	Dan Fisher	2,797	21.40%	N/A
Other	Write-ins	24	0.18%	N/A
Total votes		13,054	100.0%	N/A
Republican hold				

== Political positions ==
=== Work on Sunday ===
In 2017, Shannon Roers Jones spearheaded the push to repeal the last remnants of North Dakota's Blue laws. The 2017 bill failed. In 2019 she again sponsored the bill which would make it legal for stores to be open on Sundays before noon. In 2019, her bill passed both the House and the Senate and was signed onto law by Governor Doug Burgum, and went into effect on August 1, 2019.

=== Marijuana and criminal justice ===
Roers Jones opposes legalization of recreational marijuana. However, in 2019, she sponsored a bill calling for the decriminalization of possession of small amounts of marijuana (less than one ounce or less than 6 ounce). Under this bill, people found with small amounts of marijuana would still pay a fine, but it would not show up in their criminal records. This bill would also have expunged the criminal records of various non-violent and non-sex offenders. The bill failed to pass the ND House.

== Personal life ==
Roers Jones lives in south Fargo with her three daughters Olivia, Kendall, and Katherine. Her father Jim was elected to the North Dakota State Senate in 2016, the year she was also elected to the ND House of Representative. They both represent the 46th District. In 2018, her cousin Kristin Roers was also elected to the ND State Senate. She represents the 27th district.
