= Judy DeMers =

American politician

Member of the North Dakota Senate from the 18th district
- In office December 1, 1992 – December 1, 2000
- Succeeded by: Linda Christenson

Member of the North Dakota House of Representatives from the 18th district
- In office December 1, 1982 – December 1, 1990

Personal details
- Born: June 27, 1944 Grand Forks, North Dakota
- Died: March 12, 2024 (aged 79) Glendale, Arizona
- Party: Democratic

Judy DeMers (June 27, 1944 – March 12, 2024) was an American politician who served in the North Dakota House of Representatives from the 18th district from 1982 to 1990 and in the North Dakota Senate from the 18th district from 1992 to 2000.

She died on March 12, 2024, in Glendale, Arizona at age 79.
