= Gary Lee (politician) =

American politician

President pro tempore of the North Dakota Senate
- In office December 5, 2016 – December 3, 2018
- Preceded by: Dick Dever
- Succeeded by: David Hogue

Member of the North Dakota Senate from the 22nd district
- In office January 2001 – January 2021
- Succeeded by: Mark Weber

Personal details
- Born: July 19, 1947 (age 79) Fargo, North Dakota, U.S.
- Party: Republican
- Education: North Dakota State University (BA)

Gary Lee (born July 19, 1947) is an American politician and healthcare executive. He is a member of the North Dakota State Senate from the 22nd District, serving since 2001. He is a member of the Republican party.

== Early life and education ==
Lee was born in Fargo, North Dakota and raised in Casselton, North Dakota. He served as a Specialist in the United States Army during the Vietnam War. Lee attended the North Dakota School of Respiratory Care before earning a Bachelor of Arts from North Dakota State University.

== Career ==
Lee has served as the manager of Respiratory Care Service at Merit Care Health System since 1975. He also worked as the Director of Sanford Health.

North Dakota Senate
Preceded by Dick Dever	President pro tempore of the North Dakota Senate; 2016–2018	Succeeded by David Hogue
