= Darrell Nottestad =

American politician

Member of the North Dakota House of Representatives from the 43rd district
- In office December 1, 1994 – December 1, 2010
- Succeeded by: Curt Kreun

Personal details
- Born: November 21, 1934 (age 91) Park River, North Dakota
- Party: Republican

Darrell Nottestad (born November 21, 1934) is an American politician who served in the North Dakota House of Representatives from the 43rd district from 1994 to 2010.
