= Senator Sinner =

Senator Sinner may refer to:

- George A. Sinner (1928–2018), North Dakota State Senate
- George B. Sinner (fl. 2010s), North Dakota State Senate
