= Ben Tollefson =

American politician (1927–2021)

Ben Tollefsen

Member of the North Dakota Senate from the 38th district
- In office December 1, 2001 – December 1, 2008
- Preceded by: Rolland W. Redlin
- Succeeded by: David Hogue

Member of the North Dakota House of Representatives from the 38th district
- In office 1985–2000
- Succeeded by: Dan Ruby

Personal details
- Born: June 14, 1927 Minot, North Dakota, U.S.
- Died: December 16, 2021 (aged 94) Minot, North Dakota
- Party: Republican
- Spouse: Lila
- Children: four
- Education: Minot State University

Benjamin C. Tollefsen (June 14, 1927 – December 16, 2021) was an American politician in the state of North Dakota. He was a member of the North Dakota House of Representatives from 1985 to 2000, and the North Dakota Senate from 2001 to 2008.

He died in Minot, North Dakota, on December 16, 2021, at the age of 94.
