= Kristin Roers =

American politician

Member of the North Dakota Senate from the 27th district
- Incumbent
- Assumed office 2018

Personal details
- Born: 24 March 1977 (age 49) Lyon County, Minnesota, United States
- Party: Republican
- Profession: Nursing practice specialist

Kristin Roers (born March 24, 1977) is an American politician. She is a member of the North Dakota State Senate from the 27th District, elected in 2018. She is a member of the Republican party.

== Education and career ==
Kristin Roers was born March 24, 1977, in Lyon County, Minnesota. She earned a BS in Economics from South Dakota State University, a BS, Nursing from South Dakota State University and an MS in Nursing and Healthcare Systems Administration from the University of Minnesota.

== Political career ==
=== North Dakota Senate election of 2016 ===
In 2018 Kristin Roers announced she was running to represent District 27 in the North Dakota Senate.

2018 General Election for North Dakota Senate District 27
Party	Candidate	Votes	%	±%
Republican	Kristin Roers	5,047	55.6%	
Democratic	Quinn Joseph Garrick	4,014	44.2%	
Other	Write-ins	15	0.2%	
Total votes		2,665	100.0%	

== Personal ==
Her cousin Shannon Roers Jones and uncle Jim Roers were elected as Representative and Senator, respectively, in North Dakota legislative District 46 in 2016.
