= Ron Carlisle =

American politician (born 1940)

Member of the North Dakota Senate from the 30th district
- In office 2011–2016
- Preceded by: Bob Stenehjem
- Succeeded by: Diane Larson

Member of the North Dakota House of Representatives from the 30th district
- In office 1991–2008
- Succeeded by: Mike Nathe

Personal details
- Born: October 28, 1940 (age 85) Bismarck, North Dakota
- Party: Republican
- Spouse: Neva
- Profession: businessman

Ron D. Carlisle (born October 28, 1940) is an American politician in the state of North Dakota. He represented the 30th district in the North Dakota State Senate. A Republican, Carlisle was appointed to the Senate in 2011. He previously sat in the North Dakota House of Representatives from 1991 to his retirement from that chamber in 2008. From 1976 to 2000, he was a delegate to the North Dakota State Republican Convention. He attended Bismarck State College and Black Hills State College and holds Bachelor of Arts and Bachelor of Science degrees and is a former businessman. He also served in the United States Navy.
