= Kathy Hawken =

American politician (born 1947)

Member of the North Dakota House of Representatives from the 46th district
- In office December 1, 1996 – December 1, 2016
- Succeeded by: Shannon Roers Jones

Personal details
- Born: May 13, 1947 Fargo, North Dakota, U.S.
- Died: December 2, 2023 (aged 76) Jupiter, Florida
- Party: Republican

Kathy Hawken (May 13, 1947 – December 2, 2023) was an American politician. She was a member of the North Dakota House of Representatives from the 46th District, serving from 1996 to 2016. She is a member of the Republican party.

She died of cancer on December 2, 2023, in Jupiter, Florida at age 76.
