= George B. Sinner =

American politician

George Sinner

Member of the North Dakota Senate from the 46th district
- In office 2013–2017
- Preceded by: Jim Roers
- Succeeded by: Jim Roers

Personal details
- Born: George Brevard Sinner
- Party: Democratic
- Spouse: Margaret
- Children: Kathryn; Patrick
- Education: University of North Dakota
- Website: Campaign website

George Brevard Sinner is an American politician and member of the North Dakota Democratic-Nonpartisan League Party who served as a member of the North Dakota Senate, representing the 46th district from 2013 to 2017. Sinner is the son of former Governor George A. Sinner, and was the D-NPL nominee for North Dakota's at-large congressional district in the 2014 election.
