= Mark Weber (politician) =

American politician

Member of the North Dakota Senate from the 22nd district
- Incumbent
- Assumed office December 1, 2020
- Preceded by: Gary Lee

Personal details
- Party: Republican
- Spouse: Jadene
- Children: 2
- Relatives: Hank Weber (Father)
- Education: North Dakota State University (BS, MS)

Mark F. Weber is an American politician, farmer, and businessman serving as a member of the North Dakota Senate from the 22nd district. Elected in November 2020, he assumed on December 1, 2020.

Weber’s father, Hank Weber, served in the North Dakota House of Representatives from 1963–64 and 1967-80 as a democrat.

== Education and Career ==
Weber earned a Bachelor of Science degree in mechanized agriculture and Master of Science in agricultural economics from North Dakota State University.

Weber has worked as a farmer and was the director of the Red River Valley Sugarbeet Growers Association for 12 years before he was announced on August 30, 2011, as the director of the Northern Crops Institute in Fargo, North Dakota for 6 years. Weber would retire from that position in December 2017.

== North Dakota Senate ==
During the 2020 North Dakota Senate election, longtime incumbent state senator Gary Lee announced he would retire after serving since 2001. Weber would run for the seat unopposed in the primary and later won the general against democrat Laetitia Hellerud with 68% of the vote.

Weber serves as the Vice Chairman for the senate Taxation & Finance Committee along with being a member of the Agriculture and Veterans Affairs committee.

Weber announced he would run for re-election in 2024. Originally, Weber was challenged in the primary by high schooler Nicholas Stensland, but would eventually win the primary unopposed and go on to the general without a Democratic challenger.

During the 69th legislative session, Weber was made chairman of the Taxation & Finance Committee and introduced a bill to espand a primary residency tax credit in North Dakota as a part of an overall property tax reform plan by governor Kelly Armstrong. Armstrong would sign it in on February 19, 2025. As chairman of the taxation committee, Weber was also instrumental in getting the rest of Armstrong’s plan into law.
