= Tom Fiebiger =

American politician

Member of the North Dakota Senate from the 45th district
- In office 2006 - 2010

Personal details
- Born: September 5, 1956 (age 70) Minneapolis, Minnesota
- Party: North Dakota Democratic-NPL Party
- Spouse: Siri
- Education: Saint Olaf College, University of North Dakota
- Profession: Attorney

Tom Fiebiger is a North Dakota Democratic-NPL Party politician who served as a member of the North Dakota Senate from District 45 from 2006 to 2010.
