= Larry Robinson (politician) =

American politician (1949–2025)

Member of the North Dakota Senate from the 24th district
- In office 1989 – December 2020
- Succeeded by: Michael Wobbema

Personal details
- Born: October 3, 1949 Bismarck, North Dakota, U.S.
- Died: September 3, 2025 (aged 75) Minneapolis, Minnesota, U.S.
- Party: North Dakota Democratic-Nonpartisan League Party

Larry J. Robinson (October 3, 1949 – September 3, 2025) was an American politician who served as a member of the North Dakota Senate for the 24th district from 1989 to 2020. He was a member of the North Dakota Democratic–Nonpartisan League Party.

Robinson died at a hospital in Minneapolis, Minnesota, on September 3, 2025, at the age of 75.
