= Michelle Powers =

American politician

Member of the North Dakota Senate from the 46th district
- Incumbent
- Assumed office December 1, 2024
- Preceded by: Jim Roers

Personal details
- Party: Republican
- Website: powersfordistrict46.com

Michelle Powers is an American politician serving as a member of the North Dakota Senate from the 46th district. A Republican, she was elected in the 2024 North Dakota Senate election.
