= Mark Enget =

American politician

Member of the North Dakota Senate from the 2nd district
- Incumbent
- Assumed office December 1, 2024
- Preceded by: David Rust

Personal details
- Party: Republican
- Website: markenget.com

Mark Enget is an American politician serving as a member of the North Dakota Senate from the 2nd district. A Republican, he was elected in the 2024 North Dakota Senate election.
