= David Nething =

American politician (1933–2024)

Dave Nething

Member of the North Dakota State Senate
- In office 1966–2012

President of the National Conference of State Legislatures
- In office 1985–1986
- Preceded by: John Bragg
- Succeeded by: Irving J. Stolberg

Personal details
- Born: June 29, 1933 Valley City, North Dakota, U.S.
- Died: December 2, 2024 (aged 91) Jamestown, North Dakota, U.S.
- Party: Republican
- Spouse: Marjorie Nething
- Education: Jamestown College
- Profession: Lawyer

David Earl Nething (June 29, 1933 – December 2, 2024) was an American politician in the state of North Dakota.

== Life and career ==
Nething was born in Valley City, North Dakota, on June 29, 1933. He attended Jamestown College, where he received his A.B. and the University of North Dakota School of Law, receiving his Juris Doctor. After university, he served in the United States Army from 1951 to 1952.

Nething was elected to the North Dakota State Senate for District 29 as a Republican and served until 2012. He served stints as majority leader (1975–1985) president pro tempore (1997–98). Towards the end of his Senate career, he served as chairman of the Senate's Judiciary Committee. He did not run for re-election in 2012, opting to retire.

Nething was married to Marjorie and had three children. They resided in Jamestown, North Dakota. He was an elder in the Presbyterian church. David Nething died on December 2, 2024, at the age of 91.
