= Andrew Marschall =

American politician (born 1962)

Member of the North Dakota House of Representatives from the 16th district
- Incumbent
- Assumed office December 1, 2016 Serving with Ben Koppelman
- Preceded by: Ben W. Hanson

Personal details
- Born: December 17, 1962 (age 63) Fargo, North Dakota, U.S.
- Party: Republican

Andrew Marschall (born December 17, 1962) is an American politician who has served in the North Dakota House of Representatives from the 16th district since 2016.
