= Jamie Selzler =

American politician

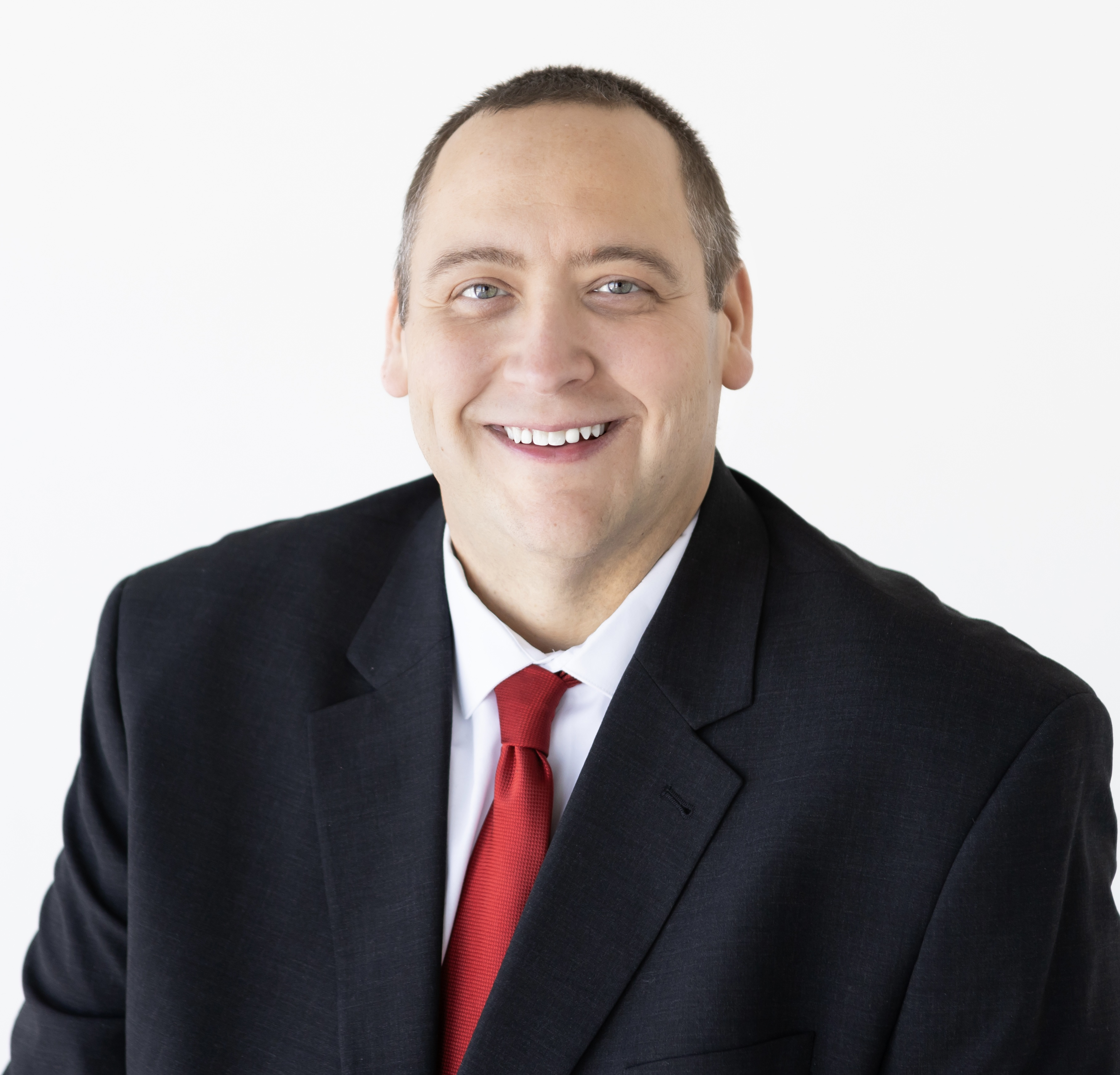
- Selzler in 2025

Member of the North Dakota Senate from the 44th district
- Incumbent
- Assumed office August 5, 2026
- Preceded by: Joshua Boschee

Personal details
- Born: July 25, 1978 (age 48) Minot, North Dakota, U.S.
- Party: Republican (before 2000); Democratic (2000–present)
- Education: University of North Dakota (BA)
- Website: Campaign website

Jamie Selzler (born July 25, 1978) is an American politician, Democratic Party official, and business executive serving as a member and Minority Leader of the North Dakota Senate from the 44th district. A Democrat, he was appointed in August 2026 to serve the remainder of the term held by Joshua Boschee, who resigned after being elected mayor of Fargo. Selzler previously served as executive director of the North Dakota Democratic–Nonpartisan League Party from 2007 to 2009. He serves as North Dakota's Democratic National Committeeman and as a member of the Democratic National Committee's Rules and Bylaws Committee.

Outside politics, Selzler has received national media attention for losing more than 350 pounds and subsequently becoming a certified personal trainer and wellness coach.

== Early life and business career ==
Selzler was born in Minot, North Dakota, and attended the University of North Dakota. He later moved to Fargo.

Selzler spent nearly 20 years working for Amazon across two periods of employment, holding corporate leadership positions in operations, customer service, and technical support, with responsibilities spanning operations in the United States and internationally.

Selzler later founded My One Change, a wellness and coaching business.

== Political career ==
Originally a Republican, he switched parties in 2000. In 2006, Selzler ran as a Democrat for the North Dakota House of Representatives in District 43. He subsequently served as executive director of the North Dakota Democratic-Nonpartisan League Party from 2007 to 2009.

Selzler later became North Dakota's Democratic National Committeeman. He was elected to another term at the North Dakota Democratic-NPL's 2024 state convention. As a member of the Democratic National Committee, he serves on the DNC Rules and Bylaws Committee.

In July 2024, Selzler was among Democratic National Committee members who opposed plans to conduct the party's presidential nomination through an expedited virtual roll call before the 2024 Democratic National Convention. ABC News reported that Selzler urged the party to retain the presidential nomination and roll call at the convention, expressing concern that an accelerated virtual vote could create the perception the party was attempting to silence debate or prematurely conclude the nomination process.

In August 2026, the District 44 Democratic-NPL Executive Committee appointed Selzler to the North Dakota Senate to complete the term of Josh Boschee after Boschee resigned following his election as mayor of Fargo. Selzler assumed office on August 5, 2026.

== Weight loss and fitness ==
Selzler has publicly discussed his experience with obesity and weight loss. Valley News Live reported in February 2026 that his weight had reached 652 pounds and that he subsequently lost more than 350 pounds over approximately three and a half years. He initially increased his physical activity through walking and later added GLP-1 medication and resistance training.

In February 2026, The New York Times profiled Selzler in an article examining how GLP-1 medications can affect people's relationships with exercise. Selzler began using Wegovy in 2023 after experiencing significant limitations in his mobility. As he lost weight, he progressively increased his physical activity, eventually walking and hiking regularly and strength training four days per week. The Times reported that Selzler's relationship with exercise changed substantially during his weight loss, and that he began enjoying physical activity for the first time.

Selzler subsequently became a certified personal trainer, certified nutrition coach, and certified wellness coach through the National Academy of Sports Medicine. NASM reported in 2026 that he had lost more than 370 pounds and had begun working with others on weight management, fitness, and behavior change.
