= Doug Larsen =

American politician (1976–2023)

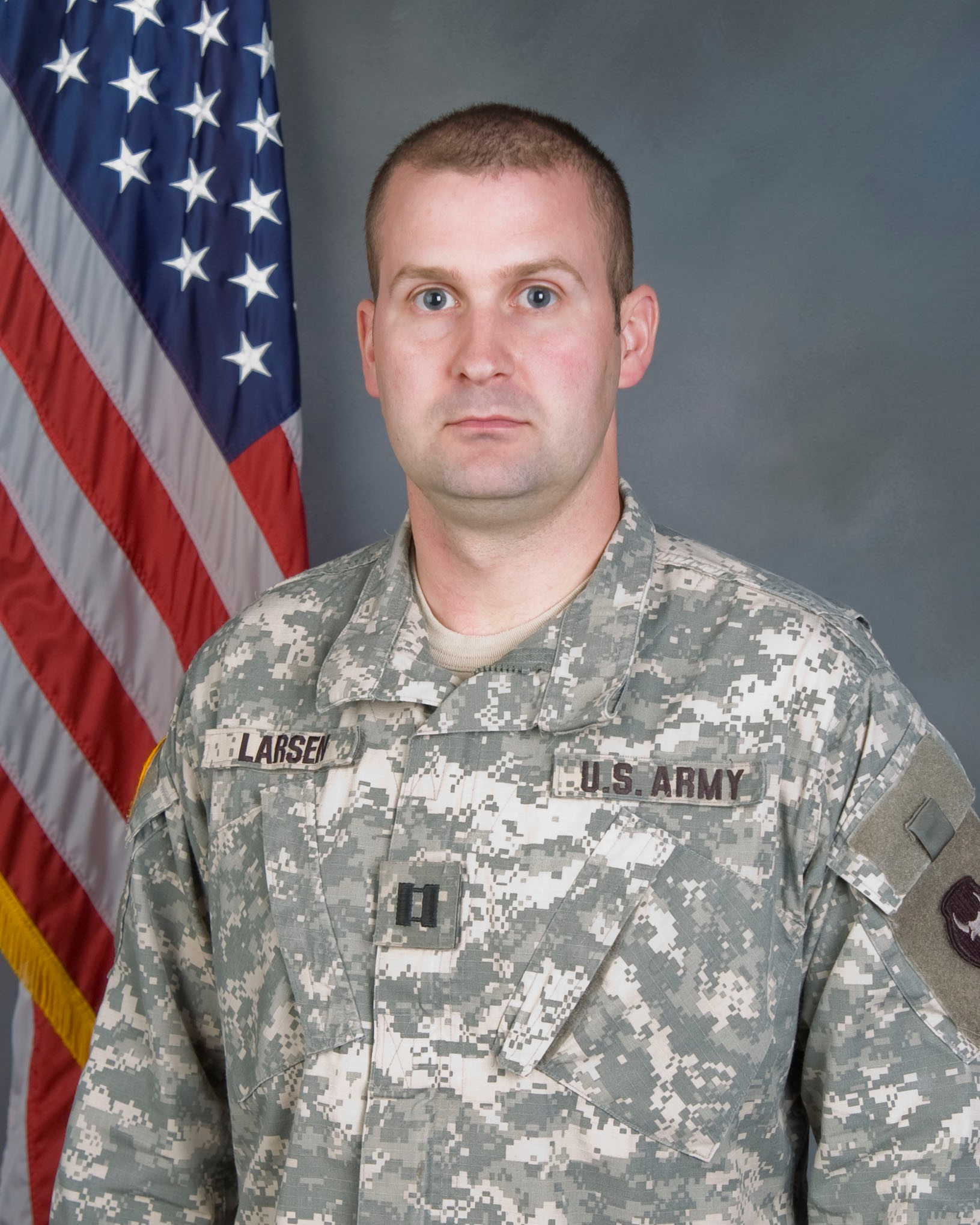
- Larsen in 2008

Member of the North Dakota Senate from the 34th district
- In office December 1, 2020 – October 1, 2023
- Preceded by: Dwight Cook
- Succeeded by: Justin Gerhardt

Personal details
- Born: Douglas Allen Larsen; March 8, 1976 Minot, North Dakota, U.S.
- Died: October 1, 2023 (aged 47) Grand County, Utah, U.S.
- Party: Republican
- Spouse: Amy Haugan (m. 2003)
- Children: 2
- Education: Minot State University (BS)

Military service
- Branch/service: United States Army; Army National Guard
- Years of service: 1994–2023
- Rank: Lieutenant colonel
- Unit: North Dakota Army National Guard; 112th Aviation Regiment
- Battles/wars: Iraq War
- Awards: Service star (bronze); Meritorious Service Medal; Army Aviator Badge

Douglas Allen Larsen (March 8, 1976 – October 1, 2023) was an American politician and businessman who served as a member of the North Dakota Senate, representing the 34th district from 2020 until his death in 2023.

== Education ==
Born in Minot on March 8, 1976, Larsen earned a Bachelor of Science degree in communication arts and political science from Minot State University.

== Career ==
Larsen served in the North Dakota Army National Guard for 29 years. He mobilized twice, to Iraq (2009–10) and later to Washington, D.C. (2013–14). When at the rank of major, he was the commander of the 112th Aviation Battalion. He was a lieutenant colonel at the time of his death.

Larsen owned Apex Builders, a home building and development company, and a Wingate by Wyndham hotel franchise in Bismarck, North Dakota. He was also a licensed real estate agent.

== Career in politics ==
Larsen was elected to the North Dakota Senate in November 2020 and assumed office on December 1, 2020.

Larsen was elected from District 34, which comprises Mandan.

== Death ==
Doug Larsen died on October 1, 2023, in a plane crash en route between family in Scottsdale, Arizona, and his home in North Dakota, shortly after taking off from a stop for fuel at Canyonlands Regional Airport in Grand County, Utah, near Moab. He was 47, and died along with his wife and both his children.
