= Arne Osland =

North Dakota senator

Member of the North Dakota Senate from the 20th District
- In office 2017 – 18 March 2019
- Preceded by: Philip Murphy
- Succeeded by: Randy Lemm

Personal details
- Born: Arnold Carl Osland; October 1942 (age 83)
- Party: Republican

Arnold Carl Osland (born October 1942) is an American politician for the Republican Party who served as a member of the North Dakota Senate from the 20th District from 2017 until his resignation on March 18, 2019, for health reasons.
