= Jose L. Castaneda =

American politician

Member of the North Dakota Senate from the 40th district
- Incumbent
- Assumed office December 1, 2024
- Preceded by: Karen Krebsbach

Personal details
- Born: Mexico City, Mexico
- Party: Republican
- Education: United States Air Force Academy (BS); Embry-Riddle Aeronautical University (MS)
- Website: josefordistrict40.com

Jose L. Castaneda is an American politician serving as a member of the North Dakota Senate from the 40th district. A Republican, he was elected in the 2024 North Dakota Senate election. He was born in Mexico City and immigrated with his family to Tucson, Arizona, where he grew up. He became an American citizen in 1995. He joined the United States Air Force after graduating as a 2nd lieutenant from the United States Air Force Academy and served for 20 years. Time served at Minot Air Force Base caused him to decide to move to North Dakota after retiring from the Air Force.
