= Dwight Cook =

American politician (1951–2024)

Member of the North Dakota Senate from the 34th district
- In office 1997 – December 1, 2020
- Succeeded by: Doug Larsen

Personal details
- Born: December 14, 1951 Moorhead, Minnesota, U.S.
- Died: January 7, 2024 (aged 72)
- Party: Republican

Dwight Cook (December 14, 1951 – January 7, 2024) was an American politician who served as a member of the North Dakota Senate for the 34th district from 1997 to 2020. He was a member of the Republican Party. He was a member of the finance and taxation committee from 2009 until his retirement, and was known for his work on balancing the state's sources of tax revenue. He also worked on the sharing of tax revenue from energy extraction between the state and tribal governments. Cook lived in Mandan with his wife Shirley. Cook died on January 7, 2024, at the age of 72.
