= Bert Anderson (politician) =

American politician

Member of North Dakota House of Representatives from the 2nd district
- Incumbent
- Assumed office December 1, 2014
- Preceded by: David Rust

Personal details
- Party: Republican
- Spouse: Diane
- Children: 2
- Education: Northwest Bible College; Lake Region College

Bert Anderson is an American politician and business owner who has served in the North Dakota House of Representatives since December 2014. He currently represents the 2nd district alongside Donald Longmuir. He was also the mayor of Crosby, North Dakota. Anderson is a member of the Republican Party.

== Biography ==
Anderson attended Northwest Bible College and Lake Region College. In 1992, he established Bert's Woodwork. Anderson served as the mayor of Crosby, as well as city council member.

On December 1, 2014, Anderson was appointed to the North Dakota House of Representatives to represent the 2nd district after incumbent David Rust was elected to the state senate. Anderson and fellow Republican Donald Longmuir went on to win the November 2016 general election. Both are unopposed in November 2020.

Anderson is married to Diane; they have two children and four grandchildren.
