= Janne Myrdal =

Member of the North Dakota Senate

Member of the North Dakota Senate from the 19th district
- Incumbent
- Assumed office December 1, 2022
- Preceded by: Robert Fors

Member of the North Dakota Senate from the 10th district
- In office December 1, 2016 – December 1, 2022
- Preceded by: Joe Miller
- Succeeded by: Ryan Braunberger

Personal details
- Born: May 4, 1962 (age 64) Skien, Telemark, Norway
- Party: Republican
- Spouse: Mark D. Myrdal (m. 1994)
- Children: 3
- Profession: Homemaker

Janne Myrdal (born May 4, 1962) is a Republican member of the North Dakota Senate, representing the 19th district. Myrdal was first elected in 2016 to the 10th district, and re-elected in 2020. She is known for her anti-abortion activism and opposition to LGBTQ rights.

== Early life and education ==
Myrdal was born in Telemark, Norway in 1962 where she lived until completing high school. She then decided to travel to Texas for a year to do humanitarian work as a Christian to help refugees. There she met Mark, an American farmer from North Dakota, whom she married in Skien, Norway in 1994. They have three children who they raised on the family farm in rural Edinburg, North Dakota where Myrdal is a homemaker.

== Politics ==
Before becoming a member of the North Dakota Senate, Myrdal headed the anti-abortion group ND Choose Life. Additionally, Myrdal is the former director of the North Dakota chapter of Concerned Women for America, a conservative activist group which opposes LGBTQ rights.

=== 2017 Legislative Session ===
In January 2017, Myrdal co-sponsored House Bill 1185, which would have classified all internet-connected devices as "pornographic vending machines" that must make unavailable any "obscene material and obscene performances" unless the end user of such a device requests an opt-out in writing and pays the state a $20 opt-out fee. Facing international ridicule, the cosponsors dropped the bill from further consideration.

Also in January 2017, Myrdal re-shared an article on her personal Facebook page that criticized LGBT opposition to then-president-elect Donald Trump. The accompanying image featured a rainbow flag that had been defaced with a swastika. Upon claiming to learn about the image, Myrdal immediately deleted the post and apologized for what she claimed was a mistake.

=== 2019 Legislative Session ===
In January 2019, Myrdal cosponsored a bill to require physicians to tell women the falsehood that it is possible to reverse a drug-induced abortion. Myrdal said the bill was about providing options to pregnant women, but the head of the state's sole abortion clinic said the claim was not backed by science. The bill did become law, but was blocked by a federal judge on the grounds that it required doctors to lie to their patients.

=== Re-election ===
In November 2020, Myrdal was re-elected to a second term in the Senate with 74% of the vote. Myrdal has the potential to be re-elected twice more before being forced to retire from the North Dakota Senate, following the approval of Measure 1.

=== 2021 Legislative Session ===
In 2021, Myrdal introduced legislation which sought to defund North Dakota State University for undertaking a longtime research project on youth sex education.

=== 2023 Legislative Session ===
Myrdal supported the so-called anti-trans Senate Bill 2231 which would prohibit government entities from mandating employees to call people by their preferred pronouns and would also require teachers to get approval from both parents and administrators before using that student's pronouns if they're different from the student's sex at birth; Myrdal said of it, ”[Teachers] came to me in the interim, and said, 'We are worried that we’re going to get fired because we have to violate our first constitutional rights of freedom of religion and freedom of speech by naming a child something that they're not.' When they feel like that's helping them and their mental dysphoria toward death's door."

Mydral introduced SCR 4013, which tightened the North Dakota constitutional initiative process, and was passed 44–3.

Myrdal faced criticism when Reverend Dr. Leanne Simmons was praying over the Senate on February 8; Senators Myrdal and Michael Wobbema (R-Valley City) turned their backs to her while she was saying "Creator of the universe and all people therein, You who formed humankind in Your image, placing them in this world in all their diversity – differing colors, genders, races, ethnicities and language. We praise You for the splendor of Your creation and the love that motivated Your hand on this Earth". Myrdal told KFR-TV S: "People lobbying from the prayer pulpit is something we don't believe in".

== Family ==
Since 1994, she has been married to Mark Myrdal (b. 1954), a farmer in Edinburg, North Dakota, who is of Norwegian descent. They married at Skien, Telemark, Norway and have three children.
