= John Grabinger =

American politician

Member of the North Dakota Senate from the 12th district
- In office January 8, 2013 – December 1, 2020
- Preceded by: Dave Nething
- Succeeded by: Cole Conley

Personal details
- Born: Jamestown, North Dakota, U.S.
- Party: Democratic
- Spouse: Debra Grabinger

John Grabinger is an American politician who served as a member of the North Dakota Senate from 2013 to 2020.

== Early life ==
Grabinger was born and raised in Jamestown, North Dakota, where he earned his diploma at Jamestown High School.

== Career ==
In 1984, he founded a boat dealership north of Jamestown called Grabinger's Marine. He was also the president of St. John's Academy School Board and has served on the Jamestown City Council. Grabinger is a volunteer firefighter at his local station.

=== North Dakota Senate ===
Grabinger's record shows a pro-choice stance, although he voted to prohibit abortions after 20 weeks. He is also pro-gay marriage and was a cosponsor of legislation banning discrimination based on sexual orientation, but the bill failed in the House.

Grabinger's votes on energy indicate a desire to increase taxes on oil extraction from their current rates.

On February 20, 2017, Grabinger and his former opponent, Bernie Satrom, introduced a bill to reduce the North Dakota prison population by investing $7 million into treatment rather than incarceration of nonviolent offenders.

He is a member of the Rules, Judiciary, and Political Subdivisions Committees as well as the Commission on Alternatives to Incarceration.

== Electoral history ==
2008: Grabinger decided to challenge 42 year senate veteran Dave Nething for the 12th senate seat. In the general election on November 4, returns showed a close race. Nething ended the first count with a vote lead over Grabinger. After a two-week delay, a recount was performed, which produced an even slimmer 2974-2966 (50.07%-49.93%) tally in favor of Nething. Nevertheless, a week later, North Dakota's state canvassing board affirmed Nething's win on November 28.

2012: Grabinger again ran unopposed in the Democratic primary in 2012 receiving 1,009 votes (99.8%) on June 9. He went on to face Republican Bernie Satrom, who had defeated Dwaine Heinrich in his primary. In the general election on November 6, Grabinger took home 2,939 votes, good for 50.67% and a 108-vote margin of victory.

2016: In January 2016, Grabinger announced his intention to run for reelection. He ran unopposed in the Democratic primary, where he received 431 votes (99.54%). In the general election, he was challenged by Republican Jamestown Mayor Katie Anderson, who had also been unopposed in her primary. Despite her receiving over 900 more votes in the primary elections in June, Grabinger sailed to a rather comfortable victory in a usually tightly contested seat, earning 3,673 votes (58.76%)

== Personal life ==
Grabinger owns a boat dealership in Jamestown, North Dakota. He has a daughter, Alexis Grabinger, who has testified on legislation before the North Dakota Senate Judiciary Committee.
