= Chuck Walen =

American politician

Member of the North Dakota Senate from the 4th district
- Incumbent
- Assumed office December 1, 2024
- Preceded by: Jordan Kannianen

Personal details
- Party: Republican

Chuck Walen is an American politician serving as a member of the North Dakota Senate from the 4th district. A Republican, he was elected in the 2024 North Dakota Senate election. Walen has a background in accounting and farming and served on the school board in West Fargo.
