= Dale Patten =

American politician and businessman

Member of the North Dakota Senate from the 26th district
- Incumbent
- Assumed office December 1, 2022
- Preceded by: Jason Heitkamp

Member of the North Dakota Senate from the 39th district
- In office December 1, 2018 – December 1, 2022
- Preceded by: Bill Bowman
- Succeeded by: Greg Kessel

Personal details
- Party: Republican
- Spouse: Joy
- Children: 2
- Education: North Dakota State University (BS)

Dale Patten is an American politician and former businessman serving as a member of the North Dakota Senate from the 26th district. He previously represented the 39th district.

== Background ==
Patten earned a Bachelor of Science degree in animal science from North Dakota State University. Prior to entering politics, he worked as a banker and served as a member of the McKenzie County Commission from 2000 to 2012. Patten has served on Natural Resources, Taxation, and Transportation committees. He was also selected to serve on the High-Level Radioactive Waste Advisory Council, a joint committee formed by legislators in North Dakota and Montana to discuss the disposal of waste material in the Bakken Formation.

Patten and his wife, Joy, have two children.
