= Shawn Vedaa =

American politician

Member of the North Dakota Senate from the 6th district
- In office December 1, 2016 – December 1, 2024
- Preceded by: David O'Connell
- Succeeded by: Paul Thomas

Personal details
- Born: September 17, 1966 (age 59) Stanley, North Dakota, U.S.
- Party: Republican

Shawn Vedaa (born September 17, 1966) is an American politician who has served in the North Dakota Senate from the 6th district since 2016. Vedaa is a past member of the U.S. National Guard and is married with 5 children.
