= Ryan Braunberger =

American politician

Member of the North Dakota Senate from the 10th district
- Incumbent
- Assumed office December 1, 2022
- Preceded by: Janne Myrdal

Personal details
- Party: Democratic
- Education: Southeastern Technical College (AA); Minnesota State University, Moorhead (BS)

Ryan Braunberger is an American politician and independent contractor currently serving as a member of the North Dakota Senate for the 10th district since 2022 as a member of the Democratic-NPL Party.

== Education ==
Braunberger graduated from Minnesota State University Moorhead in 2022 with a Bachelor's in Social Work after previously earning an associate degree from Southeastern Technical College.

== Career ==
Braunberger worked as an independent contractor and as an insurance agent before being elected to the Senate in 2022. Braunberger also serves as the Minority Caucus Leader in the senate.

Braunberger has spoken out against numerous anti-LGBT bills during the 2020s anti-LGBT movement. He has called it "frustrating" and "maddening" to be a gay lawmaker in a legislature which passes as many anti-LGBT bills as it does.
