= Justin Gerhardt =

American politician

Member of the North Dakota Senate from the 34th district
- Incumbent
- Assumed office October 23, 2023
- Preceded by: Doug Larsen

Personal details
- Party: Republican
- Education: North Dakota State University (BS)

Justin Gerhardt is an American politician. He has served as a member of the North Dakota Senate from the 34th district since 2023, and was appointed following the death of Doug Larsen. He is a member of the Republican Party.
