= Ben W. Hanson =

American politician

Member of the North Dakota House of Representatives from the 16th district
- In office 2012–2016
- Preceded by: Robert Kilichowski
- Succeeded by: Andrew Marschall

Personal details
- Born: Benjamin Warren Hanson; 1987 (age 38–39)
- Party: Democratic-NPL
- Education: Minnesota State University Moorhead; North Dakota State University
- Occupation: Realtor
- Website: hansonfornd.com

Benjamin Warren Hanson (born 1987) is an American politician of the North Dakota Democratic-NPL Party. From 2012 to 2016, he represented the 16th district in the North Dakota House of Representatives, during which time, he served as a Chair of the Democratic-NPL House Caucus. Hanson is also a commercial realtor. On August 16, 2017, Hanson announced his candidacy for the 2018 House of Representatives election in North Dakota.
