= John M. Andrist =

American politician (1931–2018)

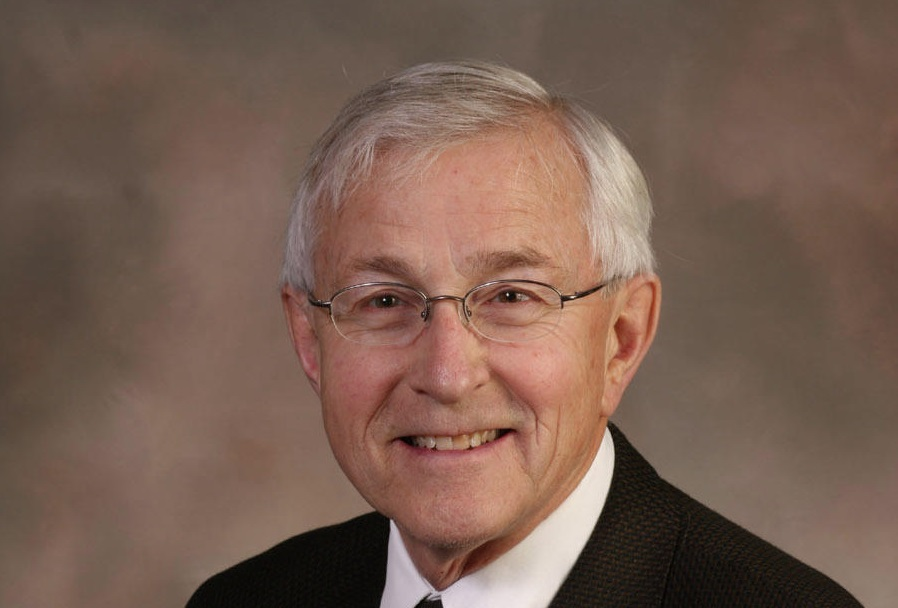

Member of the North Dakota Senate from the 2nd district
- In office 1993–2014
- Succeeded by: David Rust

Personal details
- Born: August 1, 1931 Crosby, North Dakota, U.S.
- Died: January 17, 2018 (aged 86) Fargo, North Dakota, U.S.
- Party: Republican
- Spouse: Elaine Andrist (deceased)
- Children: 5
- Profession: publisher

John M. Andrist (August 1, 1931 – January 17, 2018) was a Republican politician who was a member of the North Dakota Senate for the 2nd district from 1993 to 2014.

== Biography ==
John Andrist was born on August 1, 1931. His father, Calvin L. Andrist, was the publisher of the Divide County Journal, now known as The Crosby Journal. From 1950 to 1957, he worked full-time for the journal, served as managing editor from 1958 to 1961, and as publisher from 1961 to 1991. From 1970 to 1971, he was President of the North Dakota Press Association, and from 1989 to 1990, of the National Newspaper Association. He is also a former President of the North Dakota Society of Professional Journalists. In 2000, he was inducted in the North Dakota Newspaper Association Hall of Fame. In 2002, he received the National Newspaper Association's Amos Award for distinguished service to the community press.

He served in the North Dakota Senate from 1993 to 2014. He sat on the Board of the Medora Foundation, which aims at improving Medora, North Dakota. He was a Kiwanis member. He was a recipient of the North Dakota National Leadership Award of Excellence.

He was married to Elaine Andrist, and they had five children together before she died. He lived in Crosby, North Dakota. Andrist died in Fargo, North Dakota, on January 17, 2018, after suffering a stroke.
