= Paul Thomas (politician) =

American politician

Member of the North Dakota Senate from the 6th district
- Incumbent
- Assumed office December 1, 2024
- Preceded by: Shawn Vedaa

Member of the North Dakota House of Representatives from the 6th district
- In office December 1, 2020 – December 1, 2024
- Preceded by: Craig A. Johnson
- Succeeded by: Daniel R. Vollmer

Personal details
- Born: Karlsruhe, North Dakota, U.S.
- Party: Republican
- Education: North Dakota State University (BS)

Paul John Thomas is an American farmer, businessman, and politician who served as a member of the North Dakota Senate from the 6th district. Elected in November 2024, he assumed office on December 1, 2024.

== Early life and education ==
Thomas was born in Karlsruhe, North Dakota He earned a Bachelor of Science degree in agricultural economics from North Dakota State University in 1996.

== Career ==
Thomas served as a member of the Velva, North Dakota City Commission and Velva Sales Tax Committee. He was vice president of the North Dakota Corn Growers Association and North Dakota Farm Bureau. He was elected to the North Dakota House of Representatives in November 2020 and assumed office on December 1, 2020.
