= Jordan Kannianen =

North Dakota Senate member

Member of the North Dakota Senate from the 4th district
- In office December 1, 2016 – December 1, 2024
- Preceded by: John Warner
- Succeeded by: Chuck Walen

Personal details
- Born: August 1983 (age 42)
- Party: Republican

Jordan L. Kannianen (born August 1983) is a former American politician for the Republican Party who served as a member of the North Dakota Senate from the 4th District from 2016-2024.

== Early life ==
Kannianen graduated from Minot State University with both a Bachelor and a Master of Science in Management. He also obtained a BS in Electrical Engineering from Arizona State University.

== Personal life ==
Kannianen has thirteen children with his wife, Elizabeth. They are members of The Church of Jesus Christ of Latter-day Saints.
