= Per Osland =

Norwegian physicist

Per Osland is a Norwegian physicist specializing in theoretical particle physics. He is a professor emeritus at the University of Bergen. In the Spring of 2011, Osland was a Fellow at the Swedish Collegium for Advanced Study in Uppsala, Sweden.

== Education and career ==
Osland earned a degree in physics from the Norwegian Institute of Technology in 1968, and completed a Ph.D. at the University of Trondheim in 1975. He became a professor at the University of Bergen in 1987.

== Book ==
He is the coauthor with Roy J. Glauber of the book Asymptotic Diffraction Theory and Nuclear Scattering (Cambridge University Press, 2019).

== Recognition ==
Osland was elected to the Royal Norwegian Society of Sciences and Letters in 1989. He was president of the Norwegian Physical Society from 2010 to 2013.
