= Karen Krebsbach =

American politician (born 1940)

Member of the North Dakota Senate from the 40th district
- In office 1988 – December 1, 2024
- Succeeded by: Jose L. Castaneda

Personal details
- Born: 1940 (age 85–86)
- Party: Republican

Karen K. Krebsbach (born 1940) is an American politician. She was a member of the North Dakota State Senate from the 40th District, serving from 1988 to 2024. She is a member of the Republican party.
