= Michael Wobbema =

American politician

Member of the North Dakota Senate from the 24th district
- Incumbent
- Assumed office December 1, 2020
- Preceded by: Larry Robinson

Personal details
- Party: Republican
- Education: University of North Dakota (BA); University of Mary (MBA)

Military service
- Branch/service: United States Air Force
- Unit: National Guard Bureau; North Dakota Air National Guard; North Dakota National Guard

Michael A. Wobbema is a Republican serving as a member of the North Dakota Senate from the 24th district. Elected in November 2020, he assumed office on December 1, 2020.

== Education ==
Wobbema earned a Bachelor of Arts degree in business administration and accounting from the University of North Dakota and a Master of Business Administration from the University of Mary.

== Career ==
From 1994 to 1998, Wobbema was the CFO of Mail Center Inc., a mail services company. From 1996 to 2001, he served as the branch chief of the National Guard Bureau Counterdrug Directorate. From 2001 to 2008, he served as a commander in the North Dakota Air National Guard. He served as assistant adjunct general of the North Dakota National Guard and director of the North Dakota Flood Recovery Office. Since retiring from the Air Force as a colonel, he has worked as a church administrator and founded a farm services company. Wobbema was elected to the North Dakota Senate in November 2020 and assumed office on December 1, 2020.

== North Dakota Senate ==
=== 2023 ===
Wobbema faced criticism when Reverend Dr. Leanne Simmons was praying over the Senate on February 8 when Wobbema and fellow senator Janne Myrdal turned their backs to her while she was saying “Creator of the universe and all people therein, You who formed humankind in Your image, placing them in this world in all their diversity — differing colors, genders, races, ethnicities and language. We praise You for the splendor of Your creation and the love that motivated Your hand on this Earth,”. Wobbema said they felt like they were being lectured because of the transgender bills that they would be voting on later this session. He added, “According to God’s word, people who are called to preach God’s word are held to a higher level of accountability.”

Standing in opposition of state-sponsored school lunches for children of low-income families, Wobbema voted against a bill on March 28, 2023, that would sponsor the direct cost of lunches for children whose parents earn an income from 130 to 200% of the Federal Poverty Level by saying, “Yes, I can understand children going hungry, but is that really the problem of the school district? Is that the problem of the state of North Dakota? It’s really a problem of parents being negligent with their kids.” Wobbema was again criticized for voting, less than two weeks later, to increase meal reimbursements for North Dakota lawmakers by nearly 30 percent.
