= Curt Kreun =

American politician

Member of the North Dakota Senate from the 42nd district
- In office December 1, 2016 – December 2, 2024
- Preceded by: Mac Schneider
- Succeeded by: Claire Cory

Member of the North Dakota House of Representatives from the 43rd district
- In office 2010–2014

Personal details
- Born: Crutiss Kreun Grand Forks, North Dakota, U.S.
- Party: Republican
- Spouse: Linda
- Children: 2
- Education: Mayville State University (BS)

Curtiss "Curt" Kreun is a former American politician who served as a member of the North Dakota Senate from the 42nd district from 2016 to 2024 and as a member of the North Dakota House of Representatives from the 43rd district from 2010 to 2014.

== Early life and education ==
Kreun was born in Pipestone, Minnesota. He earned a Bachelor of Science degree in education from Mayville State University.

== Career ==
Prior to entering politics, Kreun owned a childcare center and a commercial water hauling company. He also worked as an energy consultant, auto center manager, and construction manager. Kreun served as chair of the Grand Forks Housing Authority and was a member of the Grand Forks City Council from the city's fourth ward.

=== North Dakota Legislature ===
Kreun represented the 43rd district in the North Dakota House of Representatives from 2010 to 2014. In November 2016, he was elected to the North Dakota Senate. During the 2017 legislative session, Kreun served as the vice chair of the Senate Energy and Natural Resources Committee. In the 2021–2022 session, he served as chair of the committee. Kreun announced in February 2024 that he would not seek a third term in the Senate.
