= Jim Roers =

American politician

Member of the North Dakota Senate from the 46th district
- In office December 1, 2016 – December 1, 2024
- Preceded by: George B. Sinner
- Succeeded by: Michelle Powers
- In office April 2012 – December 1, 2012
- Preceded by: Tom Fischer
- Succeeded by: George B. Sinner

Personal details
- Born: James Roers Alexandria, Minnesota, U.S.
- Party: Republican
- Spouse(s): Debby Roers, Sandra Roers
- Children: 4, including Shannon Roers Jones
- Education: North Dakota State University (BS)

James P. "Jim" Roers is an American politician and businessman who was a member of the North Dakota Senate from the 46th district. He assumed office on December 1, 2016.

== Early life and education ==
Roers was born in Alexandria, Minnesota and raised in Fargo, North Dakota. He earned a Bachelor of Science degree in agriculture from North Dakota State University.

== Career ==
Roers is the president of Roers Development, a property development company. He was appointed to the North Dakota Senate in April 2012, succeeding Tom Fischer, and served until December 2012. He was elected to the Senate in November 2016. Roers has also served as vice chair of the Senate Energy and Natural Resources Committee.

== Personal life ==
Roers and his first wife, Debby, have four children, including Shannon Roers Jones. Shane, Stacy, and Stephanie. After divorcing in 1995, Roers married Sandra Lorenz in 1998 and they were married until 2024.
