= Diane Larson =

American politician

Member of the North Dakota Senate from the 30th district
- Incumbent
- Assumed office January 3, 2017
- Preceded by: Ron Carlisle

Member of the North Dakota House of Representatives from the 30th district
- In office January 8, 2013 – December 7, 2016
- Preceded by: Dave Weiler
- Succeeded by: Glenn Bosch

Personal details
- Born: Bismarck, North Dakota
- Party: Republican

Diane Larson is an American politician who has served in the North Dakota Senate from the 30th district since 2017. She previously served in the North Dakota House of Representatives from the 30th district from 2013 to 2016.
