= David Rust =

American politician (born 1945)

Member of the North Dakota Senate from the 2nd district
- In office 2015 – December 1, 2024
- Preceded by: John M. Andrist
- Succeeded by: Mark Enget

Member of the North Dakota House of Representatives from the 2nd district
- In office 2008–2014
- Succeeded by: Bert Anderson

Personal details
- Born: December 8, 1945 (age 80) Mercer, North Dakota
- Party: Republican

David S. Rust (born December 8, 1945) is an American politician. He was a member of the North Dakota State Senate from the 2nd District, serving from 2014 to 2024. Rust previously served in the House of Representatives from 2008 to 2014. He is a member of the Republican Party.
