= David Clemens =

American politician

Member of the North Dakota Senate from the 16th district
- Incumbent
- Assumed office December 1, 2016
- Preceded by: Tyler Axness

Personal details
- Born: David A. Clemens
- Party: Republican
- Spouse: Jody Clemens
- Children: 4
- Education: North Dakota State University

David A. Clemens is an American politician. He has served in the North Dakota Senate as a Republican since 2016, representing the 16th district.

Clemens attended at the North Dakota State University, where he earned his bachelor of science degree in industrial engineering. In 2016, he won the election for the 16th district of the North Dakota Senate. Clemens succeeded politician, Tyler Axness. He had 4,457 votes with 54.1% and his opponent Axness had 3,783 votes with 45.9%. Clemens assumed his office on December 1, 2016.
