= Robert Erbele =

American politician

Member of the North Dakota Senate from the 28th district
- Incumbent
- Assumed office 2001

Personal details
- Born: September 30, 1952 (age 73) Jamestown, North Dakota, U.S.
- Party: Republican

Robert S. Erbele (born September 30, 1952) is an American politician. He is a member of the North Dakota Senate from the 28th District, serving since 2001. He is a member of the Republican Party.
