= Jay Elkin =

American politician and businessman

Member of the North Dakota Senate from the 36th district
- Incumbent
- Assumed office December 3, 2018
- Preceded by: Kelly Armstrong

Personal details
- Party: Republican

Jay R. Elkin is an American politician and businessman serving as a member of the North Dakota Senate from the 36th district.

== Education ==
Elkin attended Bismarck State College and North Dakota State University, but did not earn a degree.

== Career ==
Elkin has owned and operated a ranch. He also served as a member of the Stark County Commission. Elkin was appointed to the North Dakota Senate in December 2018, succeeding Kelly Armstrong who had been elected to the U.S. House of Representatives. He was subsequently elected in November 2020. In the 2021–2022 legislative session, Elkin is the vice chair of the Senate Education Committee.
