= Scott Meyer (politician) =

American politician

Member of the North Dakota Senate from the 18th district
- Incumbent
- Assumed office December 2016
- Preceded by: Constance Triplett

Personal details
- Born: Petersburg, North Dakota, U.S.
- Party: Republican
- Education: University of North Dakota (BS)

Scott Meyer is an American politician serving as a member of the North Dakota Senate from the 18th district. Elected in November 2015, he assumed office in December 2016.

== Early life and education ==
Meyer was born in Petersburg, North Dakota. He earned a Bachelor of Science degree in psychology from the University of North Dakota in 2006.

== Career ==
Outside of politics, Meyer works as a loan officer at Benchmark Mortgage. He was also a real estate agent. Meyer was elected to the North Dakota Senate in November 2015 and assumed office in December 2016. Since 2019, he has served as vice chair of the Senate Government and Veterans Affairs Committee.
