= Cole Conley =

American politician

Member of the North Dakota Senate from the 12th district
- Incumbent
- Assumed office December 1, 2020
- Preceded by: John Grabinger

Personal details
- Born: November 27, 1950 (age 75) Jamestown, North Dakota, U.S.
- Party: Republican
- Children: 3

Cole H. Conley (born November 27, 1950) is an American politician serving as a member of the North Dakota Senate from the 12th district. Elected in November 2020, he assumed office on December 1, 2020.

== Early life and education ==
Conley was born and raised in Jamestown, North Dakota. He attended the University of North Dakota.

== Career ==
Prior to entering politics, Conley worked as a farmer. He was also a sales associate at the Wallwork Truck Center. Conley was elected to the North Dakota Senate in November 2020 and assumed office on December 1, 2020.
