= David Hogue =

American politician

Majority Leader of the North Dakota Senate
- Incumbent
- Assumed office January 3, 2023
- Preceded by: Rich Wardner

President pro tempore of the North Dakota Senate
- In office December 3, 2018 – April 18, 2019
- Preceded by: Gary Lee
- Succeeded by: Oley Larsen

Member of the North Dakota Senate from the 38th district
- Incumbent
- Assumed office December 1, 2008
- Preceded by: Ben Tollefson

Personal details
- Born: December 5, 1962 (age 63) Bismarck, North Dakota, U.S.
- Party: Republican
- Education: Cornell College (BA); University of North Dakota (JD)

David Hogue (born December 5, 1962) is an American politician. He is a member of the North Dakota State Senate from the 38th District, serving since 2009. He is a member of the Republican party.

North Dakota Senate
Preceded by Gary Lee	President pro tempore of the North Dakota Senate; 2018–2019	Succeeded by Oley Larsen
Preceded by Rich Wardner	Majority Leader of the North Dakota Senate; 2023–present	Incumbent
