= Randy Lemm =

American politician

Member of the North Dakota Senate from the 20th district
- Incumbent
- Assumed office December 1, 2018
- Preceded by: Arne Osland

Personal details
- Party: Republican
- Spouse: Julie
- Children: 3
- Education: North Dakota State University (BS)

Randy D. Lemm is an American politician and farmer serving as a member of the North Dakota Senate from the 20th district first elected in November 2018.

== Education ==
Lemm earned a Bachelor of Science degree in animal science from North Dakota State University.

== Career ==
Prior to entering politics, Lemm worked for the North Dakota Farm Bureau. He was elected to the North Dakota Senate in November 2018. Lemm has served as chair of the interim Senate Agriculture and Natural Resources Committee. He is also a member of the Veterinary Medical Education Program Admissions Committee.
