= Dick Dever =

American politician

Member of the North Dakota Senate from the 32nd district
- Incumbent
- Assumed office 2001
- Preceded by: Marv Mutzenberger

Personal details
- Born: February 11, 1952 (age 74) Sterling, Colorado, U.S.
- Party: Republican

Dick Dever (born February 11, 1952) is an American politician. He is a member of the North Dakota Senate from the 32nd District, serving since 2001. He is a member of the Republican party.
