= Jerry Klein =

American politician

Member of the North Dakota Senate from the 14th district
- Incumbent
- Assumed office 1997

Personal details
- Born: November 21, 1951 (age 74) Aberdeen, South Dakota, U.S.
- Party: Republican

Jerry J. Klein (born November 21, 1951) is an American politician. He is a member of the North Dakota State Senate from the 14th District, serving since 1997. He is a member of the Republican Party.
