= North Dakota Senate =

Upper house of the North Dakota Legislative Assembly

Coordinates: 46°49′15″N 100°46′57″W

North Dakota State Senate
- North Dakota Legislative Assembly

Type
- Type: Upper house
- Term limits: Two four-year terms (counting from 2022)

History
- New session started: January 7, 2025

Leadership
- President: Michelle Strinden (R) since December 15, 2024
- President pro tempore: Kyle Davison (R) since April 10, 2025
- Majority Leader: David Hogue (R) since January 3, 2023
- Minority Leader: Jamie Selzler (D) since December 1, 2026

Structure
- Seats: 47
- Political groups: Majority: Republican (42); Minority: Democratic-NPL (5)
- Length of term: 4 years
- Authority: Article IV, North Dakota Constitution
- Salary: $226/session day + $628/monthly

Elections
- Last election: November 5, 2024 (23 seats)
- Next election: November 3, 2026
- Redistricting: Legislative Control

Meeting place
- Senate Chamber; North Dakota State Capitol; Bismarck, North Dakota

Website
- North Dakota Legislative Assembly

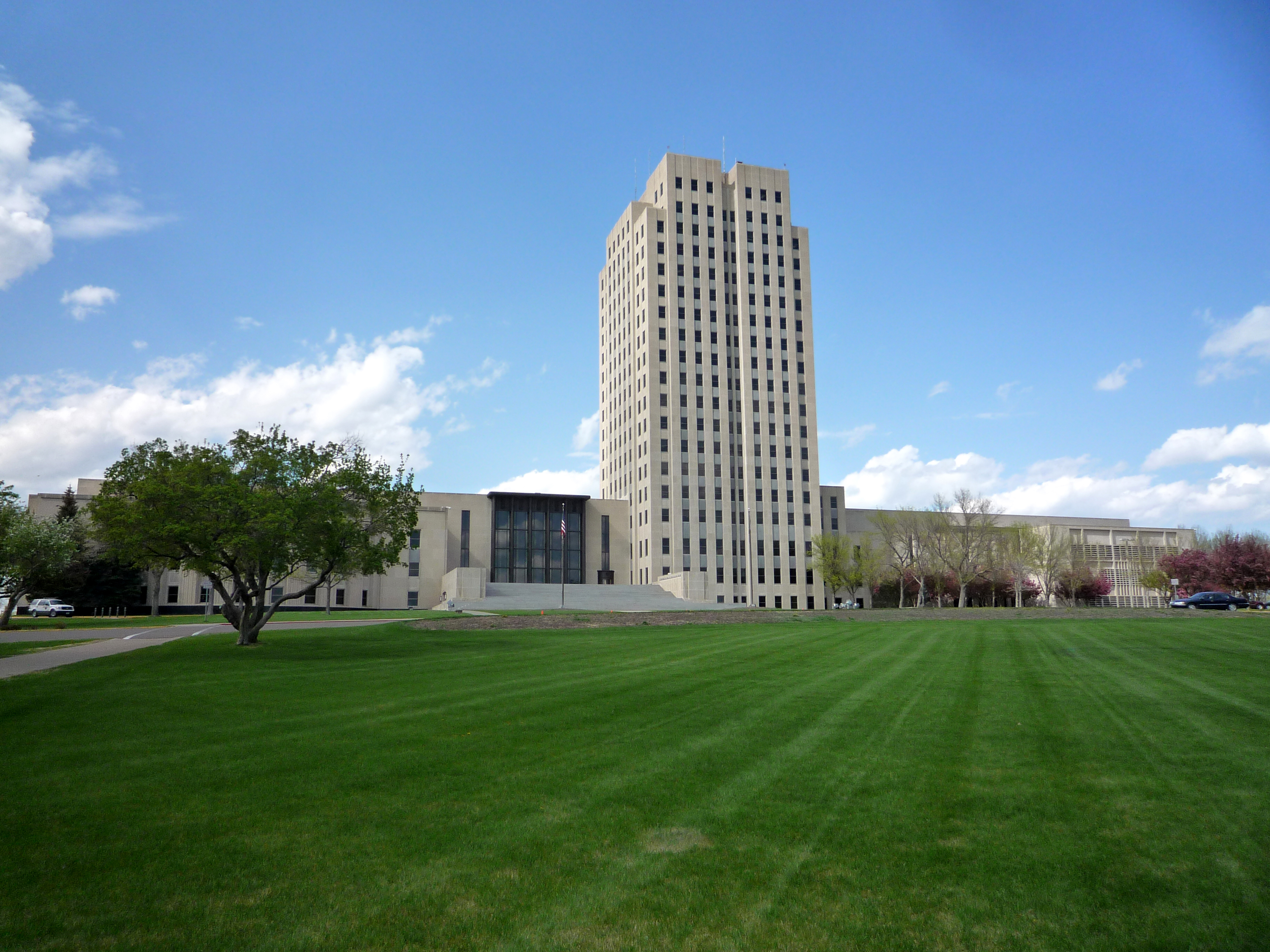
The Senate Chamber is located in the North Dakota State Capitol in Bismarck.

The North Dakota State Senate is the upper house of the North Dakota Legislative Assembly, smaller than the North Dakota House of Representatives.

Per the state constitution, North Dakota is divided into between 40 and 54 legislative districts apportioned by population as determined by the decennial census. The 2000 redistricting plan provided for 47 districts, with one senator elected from each district.

Senators serve four-year terms. Elections are staggered such that half the senate districts have elections every two years. In the 2022 North Dakota elections, a ballot measure passed with 63.4% of the vote creating term limits of eight years in the North Dakota Senate, which was put into effect starting January 2023.

The Senate Chamber is located in the North Dakota State Capitol in Bismarck, North Dakota.

== Composition ==
Affiliation	Party (Shading indicates majority caucus)		Total	Vacant
Affiliation	Republican	Democratic-NPL	Total	Vacant
65th Legislative Assembly	38	9	47	0
66th Legislative Assembly	37	10	47	0
67th Legislative Assembly	40	7	47	0
68th Legislative Assembly	43	4	47	0
69th Legislative Assembly	42	5	47	0
Latest voting share	89%	11%		

=== 2025 Officers ===
Position	Name	Party	District
President Pro Tempore of the Senate	Kyle Davison	Republican	41
Majority leader	David Hogue	Republican	38
Assistant Majority leader	Jerry Klein	Republican	14
Majority Caucus chair	Kristin Roers	Republican	27
Minority leader	Kathy Hogan	Democratic-NPL	21
Assistant Minority leader	Vacant	Democratic-NPL	
Minority Caucus chair	Ryan Braunberger	Democratic-NPL	10

=== Members of the 69th Senate ===
District	Name	Party	Residence	Start	Next Election
1	Brad Bekkedahl	Rep	Williston	2014	2026
2	Mark Enget	Rep	Powers Lake	2024	2028
3	Bob Paulson	Rep	Minot	2022	2026
4	Chuck Walen	Rep	New Town	2024	2028
5	Randy Burckhard	Rep	Minot	2010	2026
6	Paul Thomas	Rep	Velva	2024	2028
7	Michelle Axtman	Rep	Bismarck	2022	2026
8	Jeffery Magrum	Rep	Hazelton	2022	2028
9	Richard Marcellais	Dem-NPL	Belcourt	2024 (special)	2026
10	Ryan Braunberger	Dem-NPL	Fargo	2022	2028
11	Tim Mathern	Dem-NPL	Fargo	1986	2026
12	Cole Conley	Rep	Jamestown	2020	2028
13	Judy Lee	Rep	West Fargo	1994	2026
14	Jerry Klein	Rep	Fessenden	1996	2028
15	Kent Weston	Rep	Sarles	2022 (Note: Represented District 9 prior to 2024)	2026
16	David Clemens	Rep	West Fargo	2016	2028
17	Jonathan Sickler	Rep	Grand Forks	2022 (Note: Originally appointed.)	2026
18	Scott Meyer	Rep	Grand Forks	2016	2028
19	Janne Myrdal	Rep	Edinburg	2016 (Note: Represented District 10 prior to 2022)	2026
20	Randy Lemm	Rep	Hillsboro	2018	2028
21	Kathy Hogan	Dem-NPL	Fargo	2018	2026
22	Mark Weber	Rep	Casselton	2020	2028
23	Todd Beard	Rep	Williston	2022	2026
24	Michael Wobbema	Rep	Valley City	2020	2028
25	Larry Luick	Rep	Fairmount	2010	2026
26	Dale Patten	Rep	Watford City	2018 (Note: Represented District 39 prior to 2022)	2028
27	Kristin Roers	Rep	Fargo	2018	2026
28	Robert Erbele	Rep	Lehr	2000	2028
29	Terry Wanzek	Rep	Jamestown	1994	2026
30	Diane Larson	Rep	Bismarck	2016	2028
31	Donald Schaible	Rep	Mott	2010	2026
32	Dick Dever	Rep	Bismarck	2008	2028
33	Keith Boehm	Rep	Mandan	2022	2026
34	Justin Gerhardt	Rep	Mandan	2023	2028
35	Sean Cleary	Rep	Bismarck	2022	2026
36	Desiree Van Oosting	Rep	Judson	2024	2028
37	Dean Rummel	Rep	Dickinson	2022	2026
38	David Hogue	Rep	Minot	2008	2028
39	Greg Kessel	Rep	Belfield	2022	2026
40	Jose L. Castaneda	Rep	Minot	2024	2028
41	Kyle Davison	Rep	Fargo	2014	2026
42	Claire Cory	Rep	Grand Forks	2024	2028
43	Jeff Barta	Rep	Grand Forks	2022	2026
44	Jamie Selzler	Dem-NPL	Fargo	2026	2028
45	Ronald Sorvaag	Rep	Fargo	2010	2026
46	Michelle Powers	Rep	Fargo	2024	2028
47	Michael Dwyer	Rep	Bismarck	2018	2026

=== Standing Committee Assignments of the 69th Senate ===
District	Senator	Party	Committee
25	Larry Luick	Rep	Agriculture and Veteran Affairs
1	Brad Bekkedahl	Rep	Appropriations
45	Ronald Sorvaag	Rep	Appropriations - Education and Environment Division
29	Terry Wanzek	Rep	Appropriations - Government Operations Division
32	Dick Dever	Rep	Appropriations - Human Resources Division
23	Todd Beard	Rep	Education
26	Dale Patten	Rep	Energy and Natural Resources
22	Mark Weber	Rep	Finance and Taxation
13	Judy Lee	Rep	Human Services
43	Jeff Barta	Rep	Industry and Business
30	Diane Larson	Rep	Judiciary
27	Kristin Roers	Rep	State and Local Government
16	David Clemens	Rep	Transportation
24	Michael Wobbema	Rep	Workforce Development

== See also ==
- List of presidents pro tempore of the North Dakota Senate
- List of majority leaders of the North Dakota Senate
- List of North Dakota Legislative Assemblies
