= 2022 North Dakota Senate election =

- November 8, 2022

32 of the 47 seats in the North Dakota Senate 24 seats needed for a majority
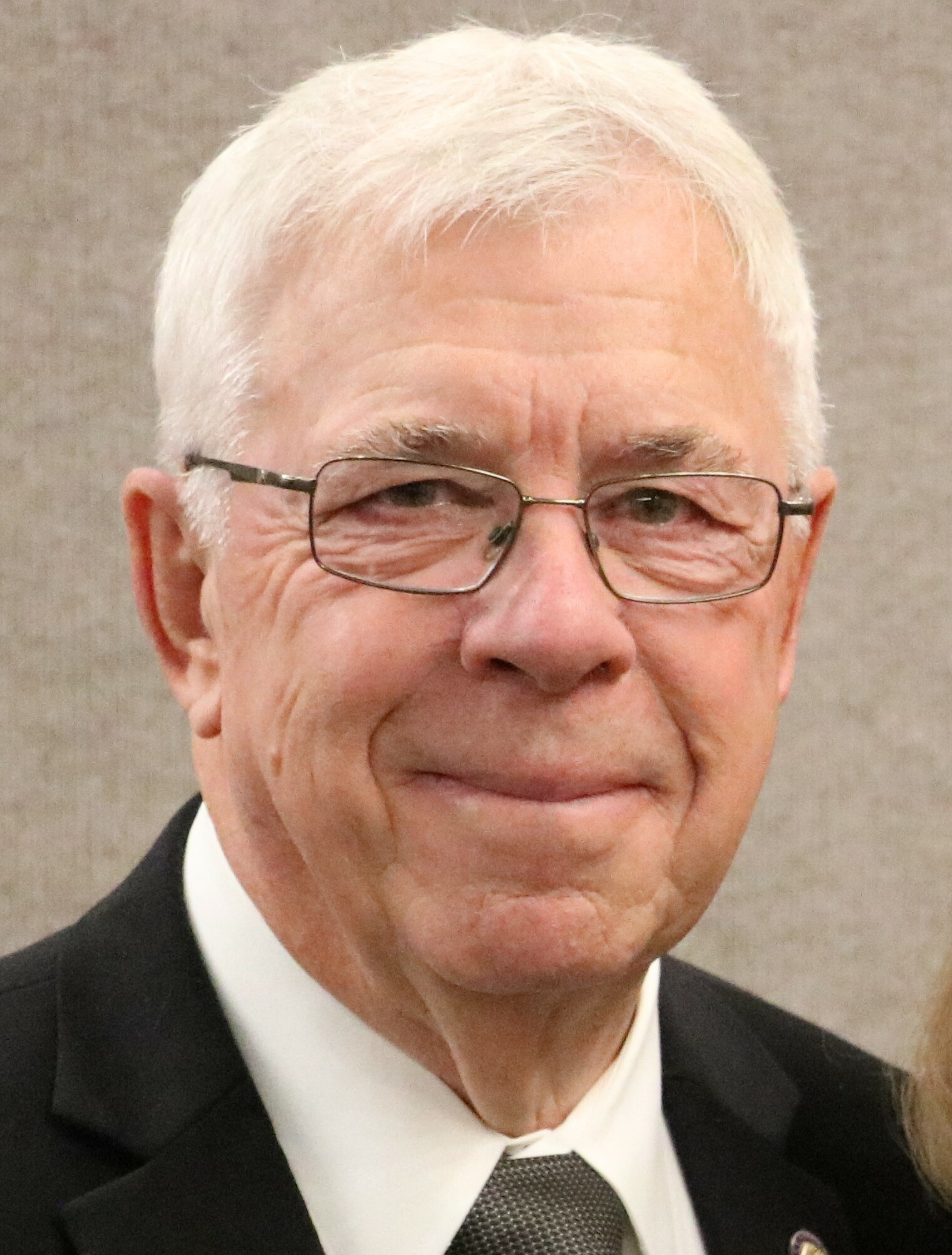

	Majority party	Minority party
Leader	Rich Wardner (retired)	Joan Heckaman (retired)
Party	Republican	Democratic–NPL
Leader's seat	37th district	23rd district
Seats before	40	7
Seats after	43	4
Seat change	▲3	▼3
Popular vote	118,180	27,285
Percentage	78.20%	18.05%
- Results: Republican gain Democratic-NPL gain Republican hold Democratic-NPL hold No election
Majority Leader before election
Rich Wardner
Republican
Elected Majority Leader
David Hogue
Republican

The 2022 North Dakota Senate elections were held on November 8, 2022, as part of the biennial 2022 United States elections. 32 of the seats in the North Dakota State Senate were up for election. Primary elections were held on June 14, 2022. The elections coincided with elections for other offices in North Dakota, including the US Senate, US House, North Dakota Secretary of State, North Dakota Attorney General, and the North Dakota House of Representatives.

Following the 2022 elections, Republicans expanded their supermajority by three seats, giving them a 43-to-4 member advantage over Democrats.

== Retirements ==
=== Democrats ===
1. District 23: Joan Heckaman retired.

=== Republicans ===
1. District 3: Oley Larsen retired.
2. District 7: Nicole Poolman retired.
3. District 8: Howard Anderson retired.
4. District 26: Jason Heitkamp retired to run for state representative.
5. District 37: Rich Wardner retired.

== Predictions ==
Source	Ranking	As of
Sabato's Crystal Ball	Safe R	May 19, 2022

== Defeated incumbents ==
=== Primary election ===
1. District 15: Republican incumbent Dave Oehlke was defeated in the Republican primary election by Judy Estenson.
2. District 20: Republican incumbent Robert Fors was defeated in the Republican primary election by fellow Republican incumbent Randy Lemm. Both incumbents had been redrawn into the same district following redistricting.
3. District 33: Republican incumbent Jessica Unruh-Bell was defeated in the Republican primary election by Keith Boehm.

=== General election ===
1. District 9: Democratic incumbent Richard Marcellais was defeated in the general election by Republican Kent Weston.
2. District 35: Democratic incumbent Tracy Potter was defeated in the general election by Republican Sean Cleary.
3. District 43: Democratic incumbent JoNell Bakke was defeated in the general election by Republican Jeff Barta.

== Summary of results by State Senate district ==
- Districts not listed were not up for election in 2022.

State Senate district	Incumbent	Party	Elected Senator	Party
1st	Brad Bekkedahl	Rep	Brad Bekkedahl	Rep
3rd	Oley Larsen	Rep	Bob Paulson	Rep
5th	Randy Burckhard	Rep	Randy Burckhard	Rep
6th (Note: Election for an unexpired 2-year term.)	Shawn Vedaa	Rep	Shawn Vedaa	Rep
7th	Nicole Poolman	Rep	Michelle Axtman	Rep
8th	Howard C. Anderson Jr.	Rep	Jeffery Magrum	Rep
9th	Richard Marcellais	Dem–NPL	Kent Weston	Rep
10th	Janne Myrdal (Note: Redistricted from district 10 to 19.)	Rep	Ryan Braunberger	Dem–NPL
11th	Tim Mathern	Dem–NPL	Tim Mathern	Dem–NPL
13th	Judy Lee	Rep	Judy Lee	Rep
15th	Dave Oehlke	Rep	Judy Estenson	Rep
17th	Jonathan Sickler	Rep	Jonathan Sickler	Rep
19th	Robert Fors	Rep	Janne Myrdal	Rep
20th	Randy Lemm	Rep	Randy Lemm	Rep
21st	Kathy Hogan	Dem–NPL	Kathy Hogan	Dem–NPL
23rd	Joan Heckaman	Dem–NPL	Todd Beard	Rep
25th	Larry Luick	Rep	Larry Luick	Rep
26th	Jason Heitkamp	Rep	Dale Patten (Note: Redistricted from district 39 to 26.)	Rep
27th	Kristin Roers	Rep	Kristin Roers	Rep
28th	Robert Erbele	Rep	Robert Erbele	Rep
29th	Terry Wanzek	Rep	Terry Wanzek	Rep
31st	Donald Schaible	Rep	Donald Schaible	Rep
33rd	Jessica Unruh-Bell	Rep	Keith Boehm	Rep
35th	Tracy Potter	Dem–NPL	Sean Cleary	Rep
36th	Jay Elkin	Rep	Jay Elkin	Rep
37th	Rich Wardner	Rep	Dean Rummel	Rep
39th	Dale Patten	Rep	Greg Kessel	Rep
41st	Kyle Davison	Rep	Kyle Davison	Rep
43rd	JoNell Bakke	Dem–NPL	Jeff Barta	Rep
44th	Merrill Piepkorn	Dem–NPL	Merrill Piepkorn	Dem–NPL
45th	Ronald Sorvaag	Rep	Ronald Sorvaag	Rep
47th	Mike Dwyer	Rep	Mike Dwyer	Rep

Primary election results source:

General election results source:

== Close races ==
Districts where the margin of victory was under 10%:

1. District 10, 1.57% (gain)
2. District 43, 6.07% (gain)
3. District 9, 7.59% (gain)

== Detailed results ==
Primary election results source:

General election results source:

- Note: If a primary election is not listed, then there was not a competitive primary in that district (i.e., only one candidate filed to run).

=== District 1 ===
General election

North Dakota's 1st Senate District general election, 2022
Party	Candidate	Votes	%
Republican	Brad Bekkedahl (incumbent)	2,939	100.00%
Total votes		2,939	100.00%
Republican hold			

=== District 3 ===
General election

North Dakota's 3rd Senate District general election, 2022
Party	Candidate	Votes	%
Republican	Bob Paulson	2,941	100.00%
Total votes		2,941	100.00%
Republican hold			

=== District 5 ===
General election

North Dakota's 5th Senate District general election, 2022
Party	Candidate	Votes	%
Republican	Randy Burckhard (incumbent)	3,795	100.00%
Total votes		3,795	100.00%
Republican hold			

=== District 6 ===
General election

North Dakota's 6th Senate District general election, 2022
Party	Candidate	Votes	%
Republican	Shawn Vedaa (incumbent)	5,677	79.45%
Independent	Robert Tolar	1,468	20.55%
Total votes		7,145	100.00%
Republican hold			

=== District 7 ===
General election

North Dakota's 7th Senate District general election, 2022
Party	Candidate	Votes	%
Republican	Michelle Axtman	5,386	100.00%
Total votes		5,386	100.00%
Republican hold			

=== District 8 ===
Republican primary

North Dakota's 8th Senate District Republican primary election, 2022
Party	Candidate	Votes	%
Republican	Jeffery Magrum	1,509	57.18%
Republican	Dave Nehring	1,130	42.82%
Total votes		2,639	100.00%

General election

North Dakota's 8th Senate District general election, 2022
Party	Candidate	Votes	%
Republican	Jeffery Magrum	5,828	100.00%
Total votes		5,828	100.00%
Republican hold			

=== District 9 ===
Democratic primary

North Dakota's 9th Senate District Democratic-NPL primary election, 2022
Party	Candidate	Votes	%
Democratic–NPL	Richard Marcellais (incumbent)	651	59.45%
Democratic–NPL	Loann Jerome	444	40.55%
Total votes		1,095	100.00%

General election

North Dakota's 9th Senate District general election, 2022
Party	Candidate	Votes	%
Republican	Kent Weston	2,335	53.80%
Democratic–NPL	Richard Marcellais (incumbent)	2,005	46.20%
Total votes		4,340	100.00%
Republican gain from Democratic–NPL			

=== District 10 ===
General election

North Dakota's 10th Senate District general election, 2022
Party	Candidate	Votes	%
Democratic–NPL	Ryan Braunberger	1,575	50.79%
Republican	Curtis Olafson	1,526	49.21%
Total votes		3,101	100.00%
Democratic–NPL gain from Republican			

=== District 11 ===
General election

North Dakota's 11th Senate District general election, 2022
Party	Candidate	Votes	%
Democratic–NPL	Tim Mathern (incumbent)	3,627	100.00%
Total votes		3,627	100.00%
Democratic–NPL hold			

=== District 13 ===
General election

North Dakota's 13th Senate District general election, 2022
Party	Candidate	Votes	%
Republican	Judy Lee (incumbent)	4,441	100.00%
Total votes		4,441	100.00%
Republican hold			

=== District 15 ===
Republican primary

North Dakota's 15th Senate District Republican primary election, 2022
Party	Candidate	Votes	%
Republican	Judy Estenson	1,602	57.38%
Republican	Dave Oehlke (incumbent)	1,190	42.62%
Total votes		2,792	100.00%

General election

North Dakota's 15th Senate District general election, 2022
Party	Candidate	Votes	%
Republican	Judy Estenson	3,417	65.90%
Democratic–NPL	Collette Brown	1,768	34.10%
Total votes		5,185	100.00%
Republican hold			

=== District 17 ===
General election

North Dakota's 17th Senate District general election, 2022
Party	Candidate	Votes	%
Republican	Jonathan Sickler (incumbent)	4,025	100.00%
Total votes		4,025	100.00%
Republican hold			

=== District 19 ===
General election

North Dakota's 19th Senate District general election, 2022
Party	Candidate	Votes	%
Republican	Janne Myrdal (incumbent)	4,369	75.84%
Democratic–NPL	Travis Hipsher	1,392	24.16%
Total votes		5,761	100.00%
Republican hold			

=== District 20 ===
Republican primary

North Dakota's 20th Senate District Republican primary election, 2022
Party	Candidate	Votes	%
Republican	Randy Lemm (incumbent)	1,543	73.58%
Republican	Robert Fors (incumbent)	554	26.42%
Total votes		2,097	100.00%

General election

North Dakota's 20th Senate District general election, 2022
Party	Candidate	Votes	%
Republican	Randy Lemm (incumbent)	4,262	71.24%
Democratic–NPL	Paul R. Hanson	1,721	28.76%
Total votes		5,983	100.00%
Republican hold			

=== District 21 ===
General election

North Dakota's 21st Senate District general election, 2022
Party	Candidate	Votes	%
Democratic–NPL	Kathy Hogan (incumbent)	2,283	62.57%
Republican	William Kloubec	1,366	37.43%
Total votes		3,649	100.00%
Democratic–NPL hold			

=== District 23 ===
General election

North Dakota's 23rd Senate District general election, 2022
Party	Candidate	Votes	%
Republican	Todd Beard	1,518	100.00%
Total votes		1,518	100.00%
Republican gain from Democratic–NPL			

=== District 25 ===
General election

North Dakota's 25th Senate District general election, 2022
Party	Candidate	Votes	%
Republican	Larry Luick (incumbent)	3,782	63.52%
Democratic–NPL	Jim Dotzenrod	2,172	36.48%
Total votes		5,954	100.00%
Republican hold			

=== District 26 ===
General election

North Dakota's 26th Senate District general election, 2022
Party	Candidate	Votes	%
Republican	Dale Patten (incumbent)	3,815	100.00%
Total votes		3,815	100.00%
Republican hold			

=== District 27 ===
General election

North Dakota's 27th Senate District general election, 2022
Party	Candidate	Votes	%
Republican	Kristin Roers (incumbent)	3,023	59.22%
Democratic–NPL	Sonja Kaye	2,082	40.78%
Total votes		5,105	100.00%
Republican hold			

=== District 28 ===
Republican primary

North Dakota's 28th Senate District Republican primary election, 2022
Party	Candidate	Votes	%
Republican	Robert (Bob) Erbele (incumbent)	2,286	64.85%
Republican	Sebastian (Seabass) Ertelt	1,239	35.15%
Total votes		3,525	100.00%

General election

North Dakota's 28th Senate District general election, 2022
Party	Candidate	Votes	%
Republican	Robert (Bob) Erbele (incumbent)	5,633	100.00%
Total votes		5,633	100.00%
Republican hold			

=== District 29 ===
General election

North Dakota's 29th Senate District general election, 2022
Party	Candidate	Votes	%
Republican	Terry Wanzek (incumbent)	4,828	73.01%
Democratic–NPL	Ben Vig	1,785	26.99%
Total votes		6,613	100.00%
Republican hold			

=== District 31 ===
General election

North Dakota's 31st Senate District general election, 2022
Party	Candidate	Votes	%
Republican	Donald Schaible (incumbent)	4,192	100.00%
Total votes		4,192	100.00%
Republican hold			

=== District 33 ===
Republican primary

North Dakota's 33rd Senate District Republican primary election, 2022
Party	Candidate	Votes	%
Republican	Keith Boehm	2,196	53.34%
Republican	Jessica Unruh-Bell (incumbent)	1,921	46.66%
Total votes		4,117	100.00%

General election

North Dakota's 33rd Senate District general election, 2022
Party	Candidate	Votes	%
Republican	Keith Boehm	6,378	100.00%
Total votes		6,378	100.00%
Republican hold			

=== District 35 ===
Republican primary

North Dakota's 35th Senate District Republican primary election, 2022
Party	Candidate	Votes	%
Republican	Sean Cleary	1,300	69.78%
Republican	Ryan Eckroth	563	30.22%
Total votes		1,863	100.00%

General election

North Dakota's 35th Senate District general election, 2022
Party	Candidate	Votes	%
Republican	Sean Cleary	3,644	60.23%
Democratic–NPL	Tracy Potter (incumbent)	2,406	39.77%
Total votes		6,050	100.00%
Republican gain from Democratic–NPL			

=== District 36 ===
General election

North Dakota's 36th Senate District general election, 2022
Party	Candidate	Votes	%
Republican	Jay Elkin (incumbent)	3,913	100.00%
Total votes		3,913	100.00%
Republican hold			

=== District 37 ===
General election

North Dakota's 37th Senate District general election, 2022
Party	Candidate	Votes	%
Republican	Dean Rummel	3,468	100.00%
Total votes		3,468	100.00%
Republican hold			

=== District 39 ===
Republican primary

North Dakota's 39th Senate District Republican primary election, 2022
Party	Candidate	Votes	%
Republican	Greg Kessel	1,907	57.03%
Republican	Andrew Gene Kordonowy	1,437	42.97%
Total votes		3,344	100.00%

General election

North Dakota's 39th Senate District general election, 2022
Party	Candidate	Votes	%
Republican	Greg Kessel	4,421	70.57%
Independent	Thea Lee	1,844	29.43%
Total votes		6,265	100.00%
Republican hold			

=== District 41 ===
General election

North Dakota's 41st Senate District general election, 2022
Party	Candidate	Votes	%
Republican	Kyle Davison (incumbent)	4,301	100.00%
Total votes		4,301	100.00%
Republican hold			

=== District 43 ===
General election

North Dakota's 43rd Senate District general election, 2022
Party	Candidate	Votes	%
Republican	Jeff Barta	1,963	53.04%
Democratic–NPL	JoNell Bakke (incumbent)	1,738	46.96%
Total votes		3,701	100.00%
Republican gain from Democratic–NPL			

=== District 44 ===
General election

North Dakota's 44th Senate District general election, 2022
Party	Candidate	Votes	%
Democratic–NPL	Merrill Piepkorn (incumbent)	2,731	62.39%
Republican	Bjorn G. Altenburg	1,646	37.61%
Total votes		4,377	100.00%
Democratic–NPL hold			

=== District 45 ===
General election

North Dakota's 45th Senate District general election, 2022
Party	Candidate	Votes	%
Republican	Ronald Sorvaag (incumbent)	3,935	100.00%
Total votes		3,935	100.00%
Republican hold			

=== District 47 ===
General election

North Dakota's 47th Senate District general election, 2022
Party	Candidate	Votes	%
Republican	Mike Dwyer (incumbent)	5,413	100.00%
Total votes		5,413	100.00%
Republican hold			
