= 2018 North Dakota Senate election =

- November 6, 2018

24 out of 47 seats in the North Dakota Senate 24 seats needed for a majority
- Turnout: 57.04%
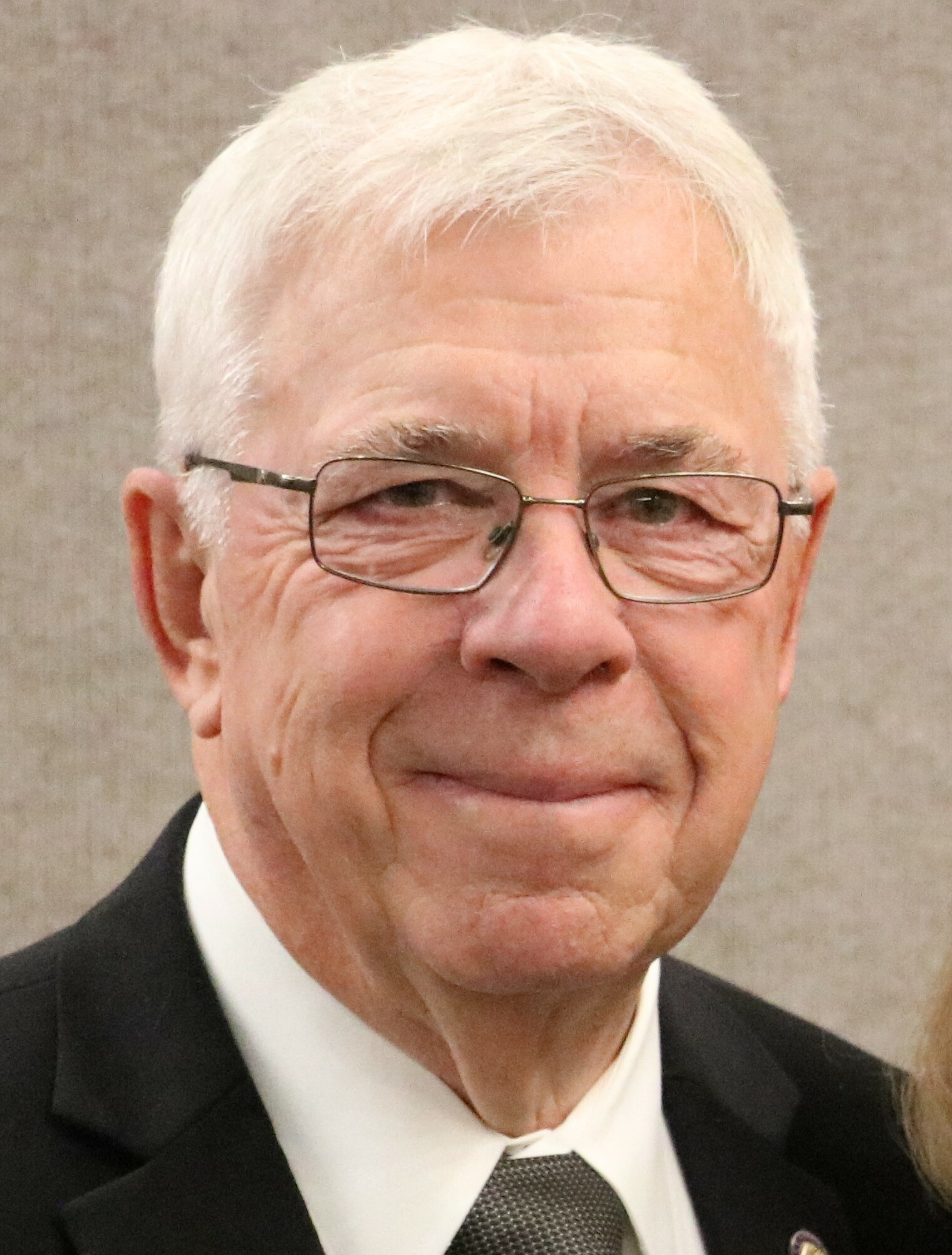

	Majority party	Minority party
Leader	Rich Wardner	Joan Heckaman
Party	Republican	Democratic–NPL
Leader since	September 6, 2011	December 5, 2016
Leader's seat	District 37	District 23
Last election	38	9
Seats after	37	10
Seat change	▼1	▲1
Popular vote	100,136	57,924
Percentage	62.52%	36.17%
Majority Leader before election
Rich Wardner
Republican
Elected Majority Leader
Rich Wardner
Republican

The 2018 North Dakota Senate election was held on November 6, 2018, to determine which party would control the North Dakota Senate for the following two years in the 66th Legislative Assembly of North Dakota. The 24 odd-numbered seats out of the 47 seats in the North Dakota Senate were up for election and the primary was held on June 12, 2018. Prior to the election, 38 seats were held by Republicans and 9 seats were held by Democrats. The general election saw Democrats flip a single seat, thereby meaning that Republicans retained their majority in the State Senate.

== Predictions ==
Source	Ranking	As of
Governing	Safe R	October 8, 2018

== Retirements ==
=== Democrats ===
1. District 21: Carolyn Nelson retired.

=== Republicans ===
1. District 19: Tom Campbell retired to unsuccessfully run for North Dakota's at-large congressional district.
2. District 27: Jonathan Casper retired.
3. District 39: Bill Bowman retired.
4. District 47: Ralph Kilzer retired.

== Incumbents defeated ==
=== In general ===
==== Republicans ====
1. District 43: Lonnie Laffen lost re-election to JoNell Bakke.

== Closest races ==
Seats where the margin of victory was under 10%:

1. District 25, 0.33%
2. District 41, 3.18%
3. District 43, 5.32% (gain)
4. District 35, 8.83%
5. District 23, 8.94%

== Results ==
=== District 1 ===
District 1 election, 2018
Party	Candidate	Votes	%
Republican	Brad Bekkedahl (incumbent)	4,390	79.01%
Democratic–NPL	Melissa Johnson	1,152	20.73%
	Scattering	14	0.26%
Total votes		5,556	100.0%
Republican hold			

=== District 3 ===
District 3 election, 2018
Party	Candidate	Votes	%
Republican	Oley Larsen (incumbent)	3,081	53.23%
Independent	Andrew Maragos	1,392	24.05%
Democratic–NPL	Joseph Nesdahl	1,307	22.58%
	Scattering	8	0.14%
Total votes		5,788	100.0%
Republican hold			

=== District 5 ===
District 5 election, 2018
Party	Candidate	Votes	%
Republican	Randy Burckhard (incumbent)	3,912	69.23%
Democratic–NPL	David Grimes Haugen	1,724	30.50%
	Scattering	15	0.27%
Total votes		5,651	100.0%
Republican hold			

=== District 7 ===
District 7 election, 2018
Party	Candidate	Votes	%
Republican	Nicole Poolman (incumbent)	8,545	98.29%
	Scattering	149	1.71%
Total votes		8,694	100.0%
Republican hold			

=== District 9 ===
District 9 election, 2018
Party	Candidate	Votes	%
Democratic–NPL	Richard Marcellais (incumbent)	4,377	98.49%
	Scattering	67	1.51%
Total votes		4,444	100.0%
Democratic–NPL hold			

=== District 11 ===
District 11 election, 2018
Party	Candidate	Votes	%
Democratic–NPL	Tim Mathern (incumbent)	4,130	62.05%
Republican	Todd McMichael	2,505	37.64%
	Scattering	21	0.31%
Total votes		6,656	100.0%
Democratic–NPL hold			

=== District 13 ===
District 13 election, 2018
Party	Candidate	Votes	%
Republican	Judy Lee (incumbent)	4,151	58.42%
Democratic–NPL	Carrie Leopold	2,939	41.36%
	Scattering	16	0.22%
Total votes		7,106	100.0%
Republican hold			

=== District 15 ===
District 15 election, 2018
Party	Candidate	Votes	%
Republican	Dave Oehlke (incumbent)	4,113	67.59%
Democratic–NPL	Barbara Vondell	1,955	32.13%
	Scattering	17	0.28%
Total votes		6,085	100.0%
Republican hold			

=== District 17 ===
District 17 election, 2018
Party	Candidate	Votes	%
Republican	Ray Holmberg (incumbent)	5,176	59.03%
Democratic–NPL	Phyllis Johnson	3,584	40.87%
	Scattering	9	0.10%
Total votes		8,769	100.0%
Republican hold			

=== District 19 ===
District 19 election, 2018
Party	Candidate	Votes	%
Republican	Robert Fors	3,732	68.00%
Democratic–NPL	Nikolaus Groenewold	1,741	31.72%
	Scattering	15	0.28%
Total votes		5,488	100.0%
Republican hold			

=== District 21 ===
District 21 election, 2018
Party	Candidate	Votes	%
Democratic–NPL	Kathy Hogan	3,482	65.12%
Republican	Sierra Heitkamp	1,835	34.32%
	Scattering	30	0.56%
Total votes		5,347	100.0%
Democratic–NPL hold			

=== District 23 ===
District 23 election, 2018
Party	Candidate	Votes	%
Democratic–NPL	Joan Heckaman (incumbent)	3,401	54.42%
Republican	Judy Estenson	2,842	45.48%
	Scattering	6	0.10%
Total votes		6,249	100.0%
Democratic–NPL hold			

=== District 25 ===
District 25 election, 2018
Party	Candidate	Votes	%
Republican	Larry Luick (incumbent)	3,154	50.07%
Democratic–NPL	Perry Miller	3,133	49.74%
	Scattering	12	0.19%
Total votes		6,299	100.0%
Republican hold			

=== District 27 ===
District 27 election, 2018
Party	Candidate	Votes	%
Republican	Kristin Roers	5,047	55.61%
Democratic–NPL	Quinn Joseph Garrick	4,014	44.23%
	Scattering	15	0.16%
Total votes		9,076	100.0%
Republican hold			

=== District 29 ===
District 29 election, 2018
Party	Candidate	Votes	%
Republican	Terry Wanzek (incumbent)	4,712	70.61%
Democratic–NPL	Katherine Roth	1,952	29.25%
	Scattering	9	0.14%
Total votes		6,673	100.0%
Republican hold			

=== District 31 ===
District 31 election, 2018
Party	Candidate	Votes	%
Republican	Donald Schaible (incumbent)	4,682	64.94%
Democratic–NPL	Rachele Hall	2,510	34.81%
	Scattering	18	0.25%
Total votes		7,210	100.0%
Republican hold			

=== District 33 ===
District 33 election, 2018
Party	Candidate	Votes	%
Republican	Jessica Unruh-Bell (incumbent)	6,314	98.23%
	Scattering	114	1.77%
Total votes		6,428	100.0%
Republican hold			

=== District 35 ===
District 35 election, 2018
Party	Candidate	Votes	%
Democratic–NPL	Erin Oban (incumbent)	3,992	54.31%
Republican	Gary Emineth	3,343	45.48%
	Scattering	16	0.21%
Total votes		7,351	100.0%
Democratic–NPL hold			

=== District 37 ===
District 37 election, 2018
Party	Candidate	Votes	%
Republican	Rich Wardner (incumbent)	5,212	81.22%
Democratic–NPL	R. Travis Brazelton	1,186	18.48%
	Scattering	19	0.30%
Total votes		6,417	100.0%
Republican hold			

=== District 39 ===
District 39 election, 2018
Party	Candidate	Votes	%
Republican	Dale Patten	7,989	98.84%
	Scattering	94	1.16%
Total votes		8,083	100.0%
Republican hold			

=== District 41 ===
District 41 election, 2018
Party	Candidate	Votes	%
Republican	Kyle Davison (incumbent)	3,607	51.50%
Democratic–NPL	Paula Thomas	3,384	48.32%
	Scattering	13	0.18%
Total votes		7,004	100.0%
Republican hold			

=== District 43 ===
District 43 election, 2018
Party	Candidate	Votes	%
Democratic–NPL	JoNell Bakke	2,692	52.59%
Republican	Lonnie Laffen (incumbent)	2,420	47.27%
	Scattering	7	0.14%
Total votes		5,119	100.0%
Democratic–NPL gain from Republican			

=== District 45 ===
District 45 election, 2018
Party	Candidate	Votes	%
Republican	Ronald Sorvaag (incumbent)	3,478	59.52%
Democratic–NPL	Danielle Pinnick	2,356	40.32%
	Scattering	9	0.16%
Total votes		5,843	100.0%
Republican hold			

=== District 47 ===
District 47 election, 2018
Party	Candidate	Votes	%
Republican	Mike Dwyer	5,896	66.82%
Democratic–NPL	Brandi Jude	2,913	33.01%
	Scattering	15	0.17%
Total votes		8,824	100.0%
Republican hold			
