= 2024 United States state legislative elections =

- November 5, 2024

85 legislative chambers 44 states
Party	Republican	Democratic	Coalition
Current chambers	56	41	2 (Note: The Alaska House of Representatives prior to the 2024 elections is controlled by a coalition of 20 Republicans, 2 Democrats, and 1 Independent.) (Note: The Alaska Senate prior to the 2024 elections is controlled by a grand coalition of 9 Democrats and 8 Republicans.)
Chambers after	57 (Note: The Minnesota House of Representatives became tied after the election, so it is not counted towards either total.)	39	2 (Note: A coalition of 14 Democrats, 5 Independents, and 2 Republicans will control the Alaska House of Representatives.) (Note: A coalition of 9 Democrats and 5 Republicans will control the Alaska Senate.)
Overall change	▲1	▼2	Steady
- Map of upper house elections: Democrats retained control Republicans retained control Coalition retained control Non-partisan legislature No regularly-scheduled elections

- Map of lower house elections: Democrats retained control Republicans gained control Republicans retained control Coalition retained control Split body formed Unicameral legislature/No lower house No regularly-scheduled elections

The 2024 United States state legislative elections were held on November 5, 2024, for 85 state legislative chambers in 44 states. Across the fifty states, approximately 65 percent of all upper house seats and 85 percent of all lower house seats were up for election. Nine legislative chambers in the five permanently inhabited U.S. territories and the federal district of Washington, D.C., also held elections. The elections take place concurrently with several other federal, state, and local elections, including the presidential election, U.S. Senate elections, U.S. House elections, and gubernatorial elections.

Prior to the election, Republicans controlled 56 legislative chambers, while Democrats controlled 41. Both chambers of the Alaska Legislature were controlled by bipartisan coalitions. The states of Arizona, Michigan, Minnesota, New Hampshire, and Pennsylvania were expected to hold the most competitive elections for legislative control. Additionally, court-ordered redistricting in Wisconsin was expected to lead to Democratic gains in both chambers of the Wisconsin Legislature. Favorable redistricting from Montana's independent redistricting commission was also expected to lead to Democratic gains in that state.

Despite Republican nominee Donald Trump's victory in the presidential election, Republicans made very modest gains in state legislative chambers across the country, flipping only one chamber and forcing a tie in another.

== Background ==
Partisan control of state legislatures following the 2022 and 2023 elections Republican control (27) Democratic control (20) Split control (2) Nonpartisan legislature (1)

The 2022 elections, midterm elections held under the presidency of Democrat Joe Biden, defied conventional expectations. Although Republicans had gained more legislative seats across the country than Democrats, they had lost control of several state legislative chambers. Republican gains were more concentrated in chambers they already controlled, while Democrats made more gains in states they controlled, as well as in battleground states where independent or court-ordered redistricting had dismantled the Republican-tilted maps of the 2010s. This enhanced Democratic policymaking power at the state level despite Republican victories at the federal level. This trend continued in 2023, where Democrats won the most competitive chambers while Republicans padded their margins in the Deep South. Heading into the 2024 elections, Republicans controlled 56 state legislative chambers to the Democrats' 41.

Alongside each state's governor, this meant that 40 states, housing 82% of the population, had government trifectas, where one party controls the governorship and both houses of the state legislature, the most in modern history. Republicans had 23 trifectas, while Democrats only had 17. Four more states had legislatures where one party's supermajority could override the veto of a governor of the opposite party, leaving only 9% of the country's population living in states with truly divided governments. The increasing prevalence of one-party control had led to starker divergence of state policies between Democratic-controlled and Republican-controlled states over the past decade on a number of key issues not governed at the federal level. Rampant gerrymandering and political polarization has contributed to this as well, leaving large swaths of districts uncontested in the general election, and especially in primary elections.

=== Party switching ===
A number of incumbent state legislators switched parties in the leadup to the 2024 election, with most of them leaving the Democratic Party and joining the Republican Party.

State	Chamber	District	Legislator	Old party	New party	Source
California	Senate	4	Marie Alvarado-Gil	Democratic	Republican	
Kansas	Senate	1	Dennis Pyle	Independent	Republican	
Nebraska	Legislature	5	Mike McDonnell	Democratic	Republican	
New Hampshire	House	Belknap 4	Matthew Coker	Democratic	Republican	
New Hampshire	House	Merrimack 8	Sherry Gould	Democratic	Republican	
Oregon	House	12	Charlie Conrad	Republican	Independent	
Texas	House	146	Shawn Thierry	Democratic	Republican	

== Issues ==
State legislative elections took a back seat in the minds of most voters due to the highly contentious presidential election on the top of the ticket in every state. Despite this, however, a few key issues permeated most of these elections. Chief among them were abortion rights, gun rights, environmental regulations, and laws regarding transgender people. Recent Supreme Court rulings had reduced federal power on these issues, charging states with crafting their own individual policies. Both parties spent millions of dollars on these races, with other long-term issues such as redistricting also in the back of their minds, while conceding that the results of the presidential election would likely heavily dictate the results of the state legislative elections.

Several states featured their own key issues in legislative races, with these usually coming up during each state's primary election. These included school vouchers in Tennessee and Texas, as well as a carbon capture pipeline in South Dakota. A number of Republican-led states, including Idaho, Missouri, South Carolina, and Wyoming saw growth in their "freedom caucuses" as well, with substantial primary challenges waged against "establishment" Republicans, especially those in leadership. In other states where one party solidly controlled the legislature but the opposite party controlled the governorship, like Kansas, Nevada, North Carolina, and Vermont, their general elections determined the efficacy of each governor's veto power.

== Summary table ==
Regularly scheduled elections were held in 85 of the 99 state legislative chambers in the United States. Nationwide, regularly scheduled elections were held for 5,809 of the 7,383 legislative seats. Many legislative chambers held elections for all seats, but some legislative chambers that use staggered elections held elections for only a portion of the total seats in the chamber. The chambers not up for election either hold regularly scheduled elections in odd-numbered years or have four-year terms and hold all regularly scheduled elections in presidential midterm election years.

Note that this table only covers regularly scheduled elections; additional special elections took place concurrently with these regularly scheduled elections.

State	Upper house				Lower house			
State	Seats up	Total	% up	Term	Seats up	Total	% up	Term
Alabama	0	35	0	4	0	105	0	4
Alaska	10	20	50	4	40	40	100	2
Arizona	30	30	100	2	60	60	100	2
Arkansas	18	35	51	2/4 (Note: The upper houses of Arkansas, Delaware, Florida, Hawaii, Illinois, Minnesota, New Jersey, and Texas use a 2-4-4 term length system.)	100	100	100	2
California	20	40	50	4	80	80	100	2
Colorado	18	35	51	4	65	65	100	2
Connecticut	36	36	100	2	151	151	100	2
Delaware	10	21	52	2/4	41	41	100	2
Florida	20	40	50	2/4	120	120	100	2
Georgia	56	56	100	2	180	180	100	2
Hawaii	12	25	52	2/4	51	51	100	2
Idaho	35	35	100	2	70	70	100	2
Illinois	20	59	34	2/4	118	118	100	2
Indiana	25	50	50	4	100	100	100	2
Iowa	25	50	50	4	100	100	100	2
Kansas	40	40	100	4	125	125	100	2
Kentucky	19	38	50	4	100	100	100	2
Louisiana	0	39	0	4	0	105	0	4
Maine	35	35	100	2	151	151	100	2
Maryland	0	47	0	4	0	141	0	4
Massachusetts	40	40	100	2	160	160	100	2
Michigan	0	38	0	4	110	110	100	2
Minnesota	0	67	0	2/4	134	134	100	2
Mississippi	0	52	0	4	0	122	0	4
Missouri	17	34	50	4	163	163	100	2
Montana	25	50	50	4	100	100	100	2
Nebraska	25 (Note: These figures represent the seats of Nebraska's unicameral legislature.)	49	51	4	N/A (unicameral)			
Nevada	10	21	48	4	42	42	100	2
New Hampshire	24	24	100	2	400	400	100	2
New Jersey	0	40	0	2/4	0	80	0	2
New Mexico	42	42	100	4	70	70	100	2
New York	63	63	100	2	150	150	100	2
North Carolina	50	50	100	2	120	120	100	2
North Dakota	23	47	49	4	46	94	50	4
Ohio	16	33	48	4	99	99	100	2
Oklahoma	24	48	50	4	101	101	100	2
Oregon	15	30	50	4	60	60	100	2
Pennsylvania	25	50	50	4	203	203	100	2
Rhode Island	38	38	100	2	75	75	100	2
South Carolina	46	46	100	4	124	124	100	2
South Dakota	35	35	100	2	70	70	100	2
Tennessee	16	33	48	4	99	99	100	2
Texas	15	31	52	2/4	150	150	100	2
Utah	15	29	52	4	75	75	100	2
Vermont	30	30	100	2	150	150	100	2
Virginia	0	40	0	4	0	100	0	2
Washington	25	49	51	4	98	98	100	2
West Virginia	17	34	50	4	100	100	100	2
Wisconsin	16	33	48	4	99	99	100	2
Wyoming	15	31	48	4	62	62	100	2
Total	1096	1973	65	N/A	4712	5413	87	N/A

== Redistricting ==
States which underwent mid-decade redistricting prior to the 2024 elections. Stripes indicate only a small number of districts were changed. Regularly-scheduled redistricting Voluntary redistricting Court-ordered redistricting

A number of states underwent mid-decade redistricting prior to the 2024 elections. Some states only changed a few districts, while others implemented entirely new maps. In Georgia, Michigan and North Dakota, and Washington, judges ruled that certain districts violated the Voting Rights Act. Georgia and Michigan failed to protect African American communities of interest while North Dakota and Washington failed to protect Native American and Hispanic communities of interest respectively.

The Wisconsin Supreme Court flipped from a conservative to a liberal majority in 2023, directly leading to the overturning of the state's legislative districts in Clarke v. Wisconsin Elections Commission. The legislature then passed new maps drawn by Democratic governor Tony Evers to avoid the possibility of the courts imposing their own maps. In Ohio, the state had to draw new legislative maps due to the Ohio Supreme Court repeatedly striking down maps prior to the 2022 elections. The state's seven-member politician commission unanimously passed new maps despite the commission's two Democratic members considering them to still be unfair.

Montana held its elections under new lines drawn by the state's independent redistricting commission. Unlike every other state, Montana does not implement new legislative districts until the fourth year following the census. The North Carolina Supreme Court, which flipped to Republican control in 2022, overturned its previous ruling prohibiting partisan gerrymandering, enabling the Republican-controlled legislature to pass new maps seen as highly favorable to them. As part of the litigation in a racial gerrymandering case in South Carolina, which primarily concerned the state's first congressional district, the plaintiffs in the case agreed to drop their challenge to the state House's map in exchange for the legislature passing changes to a small set of districts. Though this occurred in 2022, the new maps did not take effect until 2024.

Most expected the new legislative maps in Montana and Wisconsin to lead to large Democratic gains in both houses of each state's legislature.

== Electoral predictions ==
Several sites and individuals publish predictions of competitive chambers. These predictions look at factors such as the strength of the party, the strength of the candidates, and the partisan leanings of the state (reflected in part by the state's Cook Partisan Voting Index rating). The predictions assign ratings to each chambers, with the rating indicating the predicted advantage that a party has in winning that election.

Analysts' predictions for competitive state legislative chambers largely mirrored the states they considered competitive in the presidential election, with some exceptions. Presidential battlegrounds Georgia, Nevada, and North Carolina were not considered competitive due to heavy gerrymandering in each state, while both legislative chambers in Alaska, Minnesota, (Note: The Minnesota Senate did not hold regularly-scheduled elections in 2024; however, a special election held concurrently with the November general election was set to decide control in the narrowly-divided chamber.) and New Hampshire were considered competitive despite not being characterized as presidential battlegrounds. In line with national predictions of an unpredictable and competitive presidential election, many analysts, including Louis Jacobson of Sabato's Crystal Ball saw neither party as having a distinct advantage towards making gains at the state legislative level, although others, including CNalysis, gave Democrats a slight edge in both net seat gain and net chamber gain, owed in part to favorable redistricting.

Most election predictors use:

- "Tossup": No advantage
- "Tilt": Advantage that is not quite as strong as "lean"
- "Lean": Slight advantage
- "Likely": Significant, but surmountable, advantage (Note: Sabato's Crystal Ball additionally uses the "Likely" characterization to indicate chambers where a shift in control is unlikely, but the minority party could make significant gains and/or break a legislative supermajority.)
- "Safe" or "Solid": Near-certain chance of victory

State	PVI	Chamber	Last election	CNalysis (Note: CNalysis has two separate sets of predictions: Classic (Analyst ratings only), and Expanded (Classic alongside recent statewide election results). This table uses the Classic set.) Nov. 5, 2024	Sabato Oct. 23, 2024	Result
Alaska	R+8	Senate	Coal. 17–3	Solid Coal.	Lean Coal.	Coal. 14–6
Alaska	R+8	House	Coal. 23–16–1	Tossup	Tossup	Coal. 21–19
Arizona	R+2	Senate	R 16–14	Tossup	Tossup	R 17–13
Arizona	R+2	House	R 31–29	Tossup	Tossup	R 33–27
Arkansas	R+16	Senate	R 29–6	Solid R	Safe R	R 29–6
Arkansas	R+16	House	R 82–18	Solid R	Safe R	R 81–19
California	D+13	Senate	D 32–8	Solid D	Safe D	D 30–10
California	D+13	Assembly	D 62–18	Solid D	Safe D	D 60–20
Colorado	D+4	Senate	D 23–12	Solid D	Safe D	D 23–12
Colorado	D+4	House	D 46–19	Solid D	Safe D	D 43–22
Connecticut	D+7	Senate	D 24–12	Solid D	Safe D	D 25–11
Connecticut	D+7	House	D 98–53	Solid D	Safe D	D 102–49
Delaware	D+7	Senate	D 15–6	Solid D	Safe D	D 15–6
Delaware	D+7	House	D 26–15	Solid D	Safe D	D 27–14
Florida	R+3	Senate	R 28–12	Solid R	Safe R	R 28–12
Florida	R+3	House	R 85–35	Solid R	Safe R	R 85–35
Georgia	R+3	Senate	R 33–23	Solid R	Safe R	R 33–23
Georgia	R+3	House	R 101–79	Safe R	Safe R	R 100–80
Hawaii	D+14	Senate	D 23–2	Solid D	Safe D	D 22–3
Hawaii	D+14	House	D 45–6	Solid D	Safe D	D 42–9
Idaho	R+18	Senate	R 28–7	Solid R	Safe R	R 29–6
Idaho	R+18	House	R 59–11	Solid R	Safe R	R 61–9
Illinois	D+7	Senate	D 40–19	Solid D	Safe D	D 40–19
Illinois	D+7	House	D 78–40	Solid D	Safe D	D 78–40
Indiana	R+11	Senate	R 40–10	Solid R	Safe R	R 40–10
Indiana	R+11	House	R 70–30	Solid R	Safe R	R 70–30
Iowa	R+6	Senate	R 34–16	Solid R	Safe R	R 35–15
Iowa	R+6	House	R 64–36	Very Likely R	Safe R	R 67–33
Kansas	R+10	Senate	R 29–11	Solid R	Likely R	R 31–9
Kansas	R+10	House	R 85–40	Solid R	Likely R	R 88–37
Kentucky	R+16	Senate	R 31–7	Solid R	Safe R	R 31–7
Kentucky	R+16	House	R 80–20	Solid R	Safe R	R 80–20
Maine	D+2	Senate	D 22–13	Likely D	Likely D	D 20–15
Maine	D+2	House	D 82–67–2	Likely D	Lean D	D 76–73–2
Massachusetts	D+15	Senate	D 37–3	Solid D	Safe D	D 35–5
Massachusetts	D+15	House	D 134–25–1	Solid D	Safe D	D 134–25–1
Michigan	R+1	House	D 56–54	Tossup	Tossup	R 58–52
Minnesota	D+1	House	D 70–64	Likely D	Tossup	67–67
Missouri	R+10	Senate	R 24–10	Solid R	Safe R	R 24–10
Missouri	R+10	House	R 111–52	Solid R	Safe R	R 111–52
Montana	R+11	Senate	R 34–16	Solid R	Likely R	R 32–18
Montana	R+11	House	R 68–32	Solid R	Likely R	R 58–42
Nevada	R+1	Senate	D 13–8	Solid D	Safe D	D 13–8
Nevada	R+1	Assembly	D 28–14	Very Likely D	Safe D	D 27–15
New Hampshire	D+1	Senate	R 14–10	Tossup	Lean R	R 16–8
New Hampshire	D+1	House	R 201–199	Tilt D (flip)	Tossup	R 222–178
New Mexico	D+3	Senate	D 27–15	Solid D	Safe D	D 26–16
New Mexico	D+3	House	D 45–25	Solid D	Safe D	D 44–26
New York	D+10	Senate	D 42–21	Solid D	Safe D	D 41–22
New York	D+10	Assembly	D 102–48	Solid D	Safe D	D 103–47
North Carolina	R+3	Senate	R 30–20	Solid R	Likely R	R 30–20
North Carolina	R+3	House	R 71–49	Solid R	Likely R	R 71–49
North Dakota	R+20	Senate	R 43–4	Solid R	Safe R	R 42–5
North Dakota	R+20	House	R 82–12	Solid R	Safe R	R 83–11
Ohio	R+6	Senate	R 26–7	Solid R	Safe R	R 24–9
Ohio	R+6	House	R 67–32	Solid R	Likely R	R 65–34
Oklahoma	R+20	Senate	R 40–8	Solid R	Safe R	R 40–8
Oklahoma	R+20	House	R 81–20	Solid R	Safe R	R 81–20
Oregon	D+6	Senate	D 17–12–1	Solid D	Safe D	D 18–12
Oregon	D+6	House	D 35–25	Solid D	Safe D	D 36–24
Pennsylvania	R+2	Senate	R 28–22	Likely R	Lean R	R 28–22
Pennsylvania	R+2	House	D 102–101	Tossup	Tossup	D 102–101
Rhode Island	D+8	Senate	D 33–5	Solid D	Safe D	D 34–4
Rhode Island	D+8	House	D 65–9–1	Solid D	Safe D	D 64–10–1
South Carolina	R+8	Senate	R 30–16	Solid R	Safe R	R 34–12
South Carolina	R+8	House	R 88–36	Solid R	Safe R	R 88–36
South Dakota	R+16	Senate	R 31–4	Solid R	Safe R	R 32–3
South Dakota	R+16	House	R 63–7	Solid R	Safe R	R 64–6
Tennessee	R+14	Senate	R 27–6	Solid R	Safe R	R 27–6
Tennessee	R+14	House	R 75–24	Solid R	Safe R	R 75–24
Texas	R+5	Senate	R 19–12	Solid R	Safe R	R 20–11
Texas	R+5	House	R 86–64	Very Likely R	Safe R	R 88–62
Utah	R+13	Senate	R 23–6	Solid R	Safe R	R 23–6
Utah	R+13	House	R 61–14	Solid R	Safe R	R 61–14
Vermont	D+16	Senate	D 22–7–1	Solid D	Safe D	D 16–13–1
Vermont	D+16	House	D 104–38–5–3	Solid D	Safe D	D 87–56–4–3
Washington	D+8	Senate	D 29–20	Solid D	Likely D	D 30–19
Washington	D+8	House	D 58–40	Solid D	Likely D	D 59–39
West Virginia	R+22	Senate	R 30–4	Solid R	Safe R	R 32–2
West Virginia	R+22	House	R 88–12	Solid R	Safe R	R 91–9
Wisconsin	R+2	Senate	R 22–11	Solid R	Likely R	R 18–15
Wisconsin	R+2	Assembly	R 64–35	Tilt R	Lean R	R 54–45
Wyoming	R+25	Senate	R 29–2	Solid R	Safe R	R 29–2
Wyoming	R+25	House	R 57–5	Solid R	Safe R	R 56–6

== National results ==
Lower house results by party
Party	Seats before (Note: Counts seats that were vacant prior to the election towards the party that last held them)	Chambers before	Popular vote	%	Seats after	+/-	Chambers after	+/-
Republican	2,952	27	66,101,164	51.15%	2,992	▲40	28	▲1
Democratic	2,439	21	61,265,499	47.41%	2,403	▼36	19	▼2
Independent	17	0	520,825	0.40%	14	▼3	0	Steady
Progressive	4	0	9,841	0.01%	4	Steady	0	Steady
Libertarian	1	0	328,975	0.25%	0	▼1	0	Steady
Green	0	0	62,893	0.05%	0	Steady	0	Steady
Others	0	0	928,395	0.72%	0	Steady	1	Steady
Total	5,413	49	129,217,592	100.00%	5,413	—	49	—

Upper house results by party (Note: Counts seats in the officially nonpartisan Nebraska legislature towards the party that endorsed each candidate)
Party	Seats before	Chambers before	Popular vote	%	Seats after	+/-	Chambers after	+/-
Republican	1,117	29	37,762,195	50.46%	1,132	▲15	29	Steady
Democratic	852	20	35,698,342	47.71%	839	▼13	20	Steady
Independent	3	0	279,749	0.37%	1	▼2	0	Steady
Progressive	1	0	15,936	0.02%	1	Steady	0	Steady
Libertarian	0	0	182,261	0.24%	0	Steady	0	Steady
Green	0	0	18,129	0.02%	0	Steady	0	Steady
Others	0	0	874,164	1.17%	0	Steady	1	Steady
Total	1,973	50	74,830,776	100.00%	1,973	—	50	—

Despite Republican nominee Donald Trump's victory in the presidential election, Republicans made very modest gains in state legislative chambers across the country, a net gain of just over 50 seats. These gains were hampered by Democratic redistricting-based gains Montana and Wisconsin. Republicans only flipped the Michigan House of Representatives from Democrats, while the Minnesota House of Representatives went from DFL-controlled to tied. The net changes in both chamber control and overall seat control were well below average for state legislative elections during the 21st century. Twenty eight state legislative chambers which held elections saw no change in partisan composition, and only seven states saw a net shift of over five legislative seats towards one party, a drop of nearly 50% in both metrics from the 2022 elections.

A number of statehouses saw dramatic shifts through primary elections in addition to the general election. In the Texas House of Representatives, conservative Republicans ousted over a dozen opponents of school voucher legislation and targeted those who voted in favor of the impeachment of attorney general Ken Paxton. These primaries, bolstered by Republican gains in the general election, gave the pro-voucher coalition a majority in the chamber for the first time. In the Wyoming House of Representatives, the far-right Freedom Caucus gained a majority in the chamber through the Republican primary election. Progressive Democrats gained ground in Delaware and New Mexico, but they lost ground in Colorado as a result of Democratic primary elections. These shifts were considered much more minor than the shifts seen in Republican-controlled chambers.

Despite this, supermajorities were broken in several chambers: Republicans broke the Democratic supermajorities in both houses of the Vermont General Assembly, the Nevada Assembly, and the New York State Senate; while Democrats broke Republican supermajorities in the North Carolina House of Representatives, both chambers of the Montana Legislature, and the Wisconsin Senate. The supermajorities being broke in Vermont and North Carolina was particularly impactful, as it made it significantly tougher for the legislature to overturn the governor's veto. Additionally, supermajorities were obtained in other chambers: Democrats obtained supermajorities in both houses of the Oregon Legislative Assembly; while Republicans did so in the Iowa House of Representatives, the South Carolina Senate, and the New Hampshire Senate.

=== Post-election party switching ===
Following the election, two Democratic members of the Florida House of Representatives announced that they would be switching parties and joining the Republicans. Representative Susan Valdes cited a desire to work with as a part of the majority for her switch, while Hillary Cassel cited her unequivocal support for the state of Israel. The state had grown increasingly Republican in the prior years, culminating in Donald Trump's landslide victory in the state in the concurrent presidential election, including in Valdes’ district.

State	Chamber	District	Legislator	Old party	New party	Source
Florida	House	64	Susan Valdes	Democratic	Republican	
Florida	House	101	Hillary Cassel	Democratic	Republican	
New Hampshire	House	Strafford 10	Aidan Ankarberg	Republican	Independent	

== Maps ==
Partisan control of state governments following the 2024 elections:
Democratic trifecta maintained
Republican trifecta maintained
Divided government established
Divided government maintained
Officially non-partisan, unicameral legislature

Upper house seats by party holding majority in each state
Republican 50–60% 60–70% 70–80% 80–90% 90–100%	Democratic 50–60% 60–70% 70–80% 80–90%

Lower house seats by party holding majority in each state
Republican 50–60% 60–70% 70–80% 80–90% 90–100%	Democratic 50–60% 60–70% 70–80% 80–90%	Tie 50%

Net changes to upper house seats after the 2024 elections
+1 Rep seat +2 Rep seats +4 Rep seats +6 Rep seats
+1 Dem seat +2 Dem seats +4 Dem seats

Net changes to lower house seats after the 2024 elections
+1 Rep seat +2 Rep seats +3–5 Rep seats +19–20 Rep seats
+1 Dem seat +2 Dem seats +4 Dem seats +10 Dem seats

== State summaries ==
=== Alaska ===
Senate results

House of Representatives results

Half of the seats of the Alaska Senate and all of the seats of the Alaska House of Representatives were up for election in 2024. The Alaska Senate and the Alaska House of Representatives were controlled by coalitions of Democrats, Republicans, and independents. The Democratic-led coalition in the Senate maintained control, but it lost seats to the conservative Republican minority. A Democratic-led coalition won control of the House of Representatives over the previous Republican-led coalition.

Alaska Senate
Party	Leader	Before	After	Change
Democratic	Gary Stevens	9	9	Steady
Republican	Gary Stevens	8	5	Steady
Republican	—	3	6	Steady
Total		20	20	Steady

Alaska House of Representatives
Party	Leader	Before	After	Change
Republican	Calvin Schrage	1	2	Steady
Republican	Cathy Tilton	20	19	Steady
Independent	Cathy Tilton	1	5	Steady
Independent	Calvin Schrage	4	5	Steady
Democratic	Calvin Schrage	11	14	▲1
Democratic	Cathy Tilton	2	14	▲1
Independent; Republican	—	1 (Note: Consists of representative David Eastman, who is not a member of the Republican caucus.)	0	▼1
Total		40	40	Steady

=== Arizona ===
Senate results

House of Representatives results

All of the seats of the Arizona Senate and the Arizona House of Representatives were up for election in 2024. Republicans slightly expanded their narrow majorities in both chambers despite heavy Democratic spending amid hopes of winning control for the first time since the 1960s. This pushed the majority further towards the far-right, setting up even more hostilities between them and Democratic governor Katie Hobbs, who had vetoed more than 200 bills passed by the previous legislature.

Arizona Senate
Party	Leader	Before	After	Change
Republican	Warren Petersen	16	17	▲1
Democratic	Mitzi Epstein	14	13	▼1
Total		30	30	Steady

Arizona House of Representatives
Party	Leader	Before	After	Change
Republican	Ben Toma (term-limited)	31	33	▲2
Democratic	Lupe Contreras	29	27	▼2
Total		60	60	Steady

=== Arkansas ===
Senate results

House of Representatives results

Half of the seats of the Arkansas Senate and all of the seats of the Arkansas House of Representatives were up for election in 2024. Republicans maintained their supermajority control of both chambers, but Democrats made slight gains in the House, flipping one seat in Northwest Arkansas and narrowly holding their two remaining seats in the Arkansas Delta.

Arkansas State Senate
Party	Leader	Before	After	Change
Republican	Bart Hester	29	29	Steady
Democratic	Greg Leding	6	6	Steady
Total		35	35	Steady

Arkansas House of Representatives
Party	Leader	Before	After	Change
Republican	Matthew Shepherd	82	81	▼1
Democratic	Tippi McCullough	18	19	▲1
Total		100	100	Steady

=== California ===
Senate results

State Assembly results

Half of the seats of the California State Senate and all of the seats of the California State Assembly were up for election in 2024. Democrats maintained control of both chambers, although Republicans made slight gains. Republicans flipped a seat in the Senate during a presidential election for the first time since 1980.

California State Senate
Party	Leader	Before	After	Change
Democratic	Mike McGuire	31	30	▼1
Republican	Brian Jones	9	10	▲1
Total		40	40	Steady

California General Assembly
Party	Leader	Before	After	Change
Democratic	Robert Rivas	62	60	▼2
Republican	James Gallagher	18	20	▲2
Total		80	80	Steady

=== Colorado ===
Senate results

House of Representatives results

Half of the seats of the Colorado Senate and all of the seats of the Colorado House of Representatives were up for election in 2024. An unusually expensive primary election led to a slight shift towards the political center among Democratic candidates. In the general election, Democrats failed to gain a supermajority in the Senate, and a series of recounts eventually led to Republicans flipping three seats in the House, breaking the Democratic supermajority in that chamber as well.

Colorado State Senate
Party	Leader	Before	After	Change
Democratic	Steve Fenberg (term-limited)	23	23	Steady
Republican	Paul Lundeen	12	12	Steady
Total		35	35	Steady

Colorado House of Representatives
Party	Leader	Before	After	Change
Democratic	Julie McCluskie	46	43	▼3
Republican	Rose Pugliese	19	22	▲3
Total		65	65	Steady

=== Connecticut ===
Senate results

House of Representatives results

All of the seats of the Connecticut State Senate and the Connecticut House of Representatives were up for election in 2024. Democrats expanded their majorities in both chambers despite their losses at the national level.

Connecticut State Senate
Party	Leader	Before	After	Change
Democratic	Martin Looney	24	25	▲1
Republican	Stephen Harding	12	11	▼1
Total		36	36	Steady

Connecticut House of Representatives
Party	Leader	Before	After	Change
Democratic	Matthew Ritter	98	102	▲4
Republican	Vincent Candelora	53	49	▼4
Total		151	151	Steady

=== Delaware ===
Senate results

House of Representatives election

Half of the seats of the Delaware State Senate and all of the Delaware House of Representatives were up for election in 2024. In the primary election, House speaker Valerie Longhurst lost renomination to a progressive challenger. In the general election, Democrats maintained their supermajority in the Senate and slightly expanded their majority in the House. They had targeted four Republican-held House seats, but they only flipped one, gaining the three-fifths supermajority required to overturn gubernatorial vetoes but not the two-thirds supermajority required to unilaterally pass constitutional amendments.

Delaware State Senate
Party	Leader	Before	After	Change
Democratic	David Sokola	15	15	Steady
Republican	Gerald Hocker	6	6	Steady
Total		21	21	Steady

Delaware House of Representatives
Party	Leader	Before	After	Change
Democratic	Valerie Longhurst (lost renomination)	26	27	▲1
Republican	Michael Ramone (retired)	15	14	▼1
Total		41	41	Steady

=== Florida ===
Senate results

House of Representatives results

Half of the seats of the Florida Senate and all of the seats of the Florida House of Representatives were up for election in 2024. Republicans maintained their historically large supermajorities of both chambers, slightly expanding their margin in the House. This included the defeat of a Democrat who had just flipped a seat in a special election earlier in the year, which had buoyed the party's hopes of rolling back the gains Republicans had made in recent years. Several of the other Democratic losses came by very narrow margins.

After the election, two Democratic House members switched parties and joined the Republicans, further inflating their supermajority in the chamber.

Florida Senate
Party	Leader	Before	After	Change
Republican	Kathleen Passidomo (term-limited)	28	28	Steady
Democratic	Lauren Book (term-limited)	12	12	Steady
Total		40	40	Steady

Florida House of Representatives
Party	Leader	Before	After	Change
Republican	Paul Renner (term-limited)	84	85	▲1
Democratic	Fentrice Driskell	36	35	▼1
Total		120	120	Steady

=== Georgia ===
Senate results

House of Representatives results

All of the seats of the Georgia State Senate and the Georgia House of Representatives were up for election in 2024. A federal judge ordered the redrawing of a few House districts in the Black Belt over racial gerrymandering claims. Republicans maintained control of both chambers, with Democrats making narrow gains in the House.

Georgia State Senate
Party	Leader	Before	After	Change
Republican	John Kennedy	33	33	Steady
Democratic	Gloria Butler (retired)	23	23	Steady
Total		56	56	Steady

Georgia House of Representatives
Party	Leader	Before	After	Change
Republican	Jon Burns	102	100	▼2
Democratic	James Beverly (retired)	78	80	▲2
Total		180	180	Steady

=== Hawaii ===
Senate results

House of Representatives results

Half of the seats of the Hawaii Senate and all of the seats of the Hawaii House of Representatives were up for election in 2024. Democrats maintained their supermajority control of both chambers, but Republicans, buoyed by Donald Trump's presidential election victory, gained several seats, leading them to seat their largest caucus in either chamber in two decades.

Hawaii Senate
Party	Leader	Before	After	Change
Democratic	Ron Kouchi	23	22	▼1
Republican	Kurt Fevella	2	3	▲1
Total		25	25	Steady

Hawaii House of Representatives
Party	Leader	Before	After	Change
Democratic	Scott Saiki (lost renomination)	45	42	▼3
Republican	Lauren Matsumoto	6	9	▲3
Total		51	51	Steady

=== Idaho ===
Senate results

All of the seats of the Idaho Senate and the Idaho House of Representatives were up for election in 2024. Conflict within the Idaho Republican Party's freedom caucus and more moderate wing led to a high number of primary challenges. These challenges resulted in modest gains for the freedom caucus, including the ouster of Senate President Pro Tempore Chuck Winder. In the general election, Republicans won a handful of seats from the Democrats, further expanding their supermajorities in both legislative chambers.

Idaho Senate
Party	Leader	Before	After	Change
Republican	Chuck Winder (lost renomination)	28	29	▲1
Democratic	Melissa Wintrow	7	6	▼1
Total		35	35	Steady

Idaho House of Representatives
Party	Leader	Before	After	Change
Republican	Mike Moyle	59	61	▲2
Democratic	Ilana Rubel	11	9	▼2
Total		70	70	Steady

=== Illinois ===
Senate results

House of Representatives results

One third of the seats of the Illinois Senate and all of the seats of the Illinois House of Representatives were up for election in 2024. Despite a number of highly-competitive races in both chambers, no seats changed partisan control, allowing Democrats to maintain their supermajorities in both chambers.

Illinois Senate
Party	Leader	Before	After	Change
Democratic	Don Harmon	40	40	Steady
Republican	John Curran	19	19	Steady
Total		59	59	Steady

Illinois House of Representatives
Party	Leader	Before	After	Change
Democratic	Chris Welch	78	78	Steady
Republican	Tony McCombie	40	40	Steady
Total		118	118	Steady

=== Indiana ===
Senate results

House of Representatives results

Half of the seats of the Indiana Senate and all of the seats of the Indiana House of Representatives were up for election in 2024. Despite several close races in the House, no seats changed partisan control in either chamber, allowing Republicans to maintain the supermajority they have held in the legislature since the 2012 elections.

Indiana Senate
Party	Leader	Before	After	Change
Republican	Rodric Bray	40	40	Steady
Democratic	Greg Taylor	10	10	Steady
Total		50	50	Steady

Indiana House of Representatives
Party	Leader	Before	After	Change
Republican	Todd Huston	70	70	Steady
Democratic	Phil GiaQuinta	30	30	Steady
Total		100	100	Steady

=== Iowa ===
Senate results

House of Representatives results

Half of the seats of the Iowa Senate and all of the seats of the Iowa House of Representatives were up for election in 2024. Despite both parties flipping seats in each chamber, Republicans netted seats in both chambers, expanding their supermajority in the Senate and gaining in the House. Having essentially wiped out every remaining rural Democrat in previous elections, Republican gains were concentrated more in the state's urban areas where Democrats strength remains steady. The results gave Republicans their largest majority in either chamber since 1970.

Iowa Senate
Party	Leader	Before	After	Change
Republican	Amy Sinclair	34	35	▲1
Democratic	Pam Jochum (retired)	16	15	▼1
Total		50	50	Steady

Iowa House of Representatives
Party	Leader	Before	After	Change
Republican	Pat Grassley	64	67	▲3
Democratic	Jennifer Konfrst	36	33	▼3
Total		100	100	Steady

=== Kansas ===
Senate results

House of Representatives results

All of the seats of the Kansas Senate and the Kansas House of Representatives were up for election in 2024. Despite heavy investment from Democrats and hopes of breaking the Republican supermajority in either chamber to strengthen the veto power of Democratic governor Laura Kelly, Republicans made gains in both chambers, instead. The expanded majorities further weakened Democratic leverage, which often relied on small numbers of moderate Republicans siding with them, empowering the more conservative Republicans instead. This allowed for the passage of a constitutional amendment calling for the direct election of the Kansas Supreme Court, removing that power from the governor, long a priority of the conservative wing of the party.

Kansas Senate
Party	Leader	Before	After	Change
Republican	Ty Masterson	29	31	▲2
Democratic	Dinah Sykes	11	9	▼2
Total		40	40	Steady

Kansas House of Representatives
Party	Leader	Before	After	Change
Republican	Daniel Hawkins	85	88	▲3
Democratic	Vic Miller (retired)	40	37	▼3
Total		125	125	Steady

=== Kentucky ===
Senate results

House of Representatives results

Half of the seats of the Kentucky Senate and all of the seats of the Kentucky House of Representatives were up for election in 2024. Republicans maintained supermajorities in both chambers with no net change in seat share in either.

Kentucky Senate
Party	Leader	Before	After	Change
Republican	Robert Stivers	31	31	Steady
Democratic	Gerald Neal	7	7	Steady
Total		38	38	Steady

Kentucky House of Representatives
Party	Leader	Before	After	Change
Republican	David Osborne	80	80	Steady
Democratic	Derrick Graham (retired)	20	20	Steady
Total		100	100	Steady

=== Maine ===
Senate results

House of Representatives results

All of the seats of the Maine Senate and the Maine House of Representatives were up for election in 2024. After a flurry of recounts, Democrats maintained their majorities in both chambers, although Republicans made gains in each. Both Republican gains in the Senate came from seats held by retiring Democrats, while they defeated several incumbent Democrats in the House in addition to winning open seats.

Maine Senate
Party	Leader	Before	After	Change
Democratic	Troy Jackson (term-limited)	22	20	▼2
Republican	Trey Stewart	13	15	▲2
Total		35	35	Steady

Maine House of Representatives
Party	Leader	Before	After	Change
Democratic	Rachel Talbot Ross (term-limited)	81	76	▼5
Republican	Billy Bob Faulkingham	68	73	▲5
Independent	—	2	2	Steady
Total		151	151	Steady

=== Massachusetts ===
Senate results

House of Representatives results

All of the seats of the Massachusetts Senate and the Massachusetts House of Representatives were up for election in 2024. Democrats maintained supermajority control of both chambers, although Republicans gained one seat in the Senate. Both parties flipped two seats in the House, with all of the flips in both chambers coming from southeastern Massachusetts. Nearly two thirds of the legislature faced no opposition in the general election.

Massachusetts Senate
Party	Leader	Before	After	Change
Democratic	Karen Spilka	36	35	▼1
Republican	Bruce Tarr	4	5	▲1
Total		40	40	Steady

Massachusetts House of Representatives
Party	Leader	Before	After	Change
Democratic	Ron Mariano	134	134	Steady
Independent	Ron Mariano	1	1	Steady
Republican	Bradley Jones Jr.	25	25	Steady
Total		160	160	Steady

=== Michigan ===
House of Representatives results

All of the seats of the Michigan House of Representatives were up for election in 2024; the Michigan Senate did not hold regularly scheduled elections. Democrats had won a government trifecta in the state in the 2022 elections for the first time in decades. They used this newfound power to roll back many of the policies enacted by former Republican governor Rick Snyder, including the state's right-to-work law and the repealing of the prevailing wage. A federal judge had ordered the redrawing of a number of districts in Detroit over allegations that the state's independent redistricting commission had unlawfully diluted the voting power of the city's Black voters. Republicans won control of the House from the Democrats, creating a divided government.

Michigan House of Representatives
Party	Leader	Before	After	Change
Democratic	Joe Tate	56	52	▼4
Republican	Matt Hall	54	58	▲4
Total		110	110	Steady

=== Minnesota ===
House of Representatives results

All of the seats of the Minnesota House of Representatives were up for election in 2024. The Minnesota Senate did not hold regularly scheduled elections in 2024. DFLers had won a government trifecta in the state in the 2022 elections, and they leveraged this to pass a slew of progressive legislation. This included expansions of abortion rights, a progressive child tax credit, and universal free school meals. Republicans gained 3 seats in the House, tying the chamber. Two DFL-won seats became vacant after the election, giving Republicans a numerical majority when the legislative session started. DFL legislators boycotted the session, but they eventually returned and negotiated a power-sharing deal that allowed Republican Lisa Demuth to be elected Speaker, ending the DFL trifecta.

Minnesota House of Representatives
Party	Leader	Before	After	Change
Democratic (DFL)	Melissa Hortman	70	67	▼3
Republican	Lisa Demuth	64	67	▲3
Total		134	134	Steady

=== Missouri ===
Senate results

House of Representatives results

Half of the seats of the Missouri Senate and all of the seats of the Missouri House of Representatives were up for election in 2024. Both parties flipped one seat in each chamber, resulting in no net change in composition, allowing Republicans to maintain their supermajorities in each chamber. This was the first election since 2014 where Democrats made no net gains in either chamber.

Missouri Senate
Party	Leader	Before	After	Change
Republican	Caleb Rowden (term-limited)	24	24	Steady
Democratic	Doug Beck	10	10	Steady
Total		34	34	Steady

Missouri House of Representatives
Party	Leader	Before	After	Change
Republican	Dean Plocher (term-limited)	111	111	Steady
Democratic	Crystal Quade (term-limited)	52	52	Steady
Total		163	163	Steady

=== Montana ===
Senate results

House of Representatives results

Half of the seats of the Montana Senate and all of the seats of the Montana House of Representatives were up for election in 2024. This was the first election under new legislative lines drawn by an independent, bipartisan commission as Montana does not adopt new legislative lines until 4 years after the census. Aided by the new maps, Democrats broke the Republicans' legislative supermajority in both chambers, although Republicans still maintained control. In the Senate, nine moderate Republicans formed a loose coalition with the chamber's Democrats to pass legislation, broadly stripping power from the party's conservative wing.

Montana Senate
Party	Leader	Before	After	Change
Republican	Jason Ellsworth	34	32	▼2
Democratic	Pat Flowers	16	18	▲2
Total		50	50	Steady

Montana House of Representatives
Party	Leader	Before	After	Change
Republican	Matt Regier (term-limited)	68	58	▼10
Democratic	Kim Abbott (term-limited)	32	42	▲10
Total		100	100	Steady

=== Nebraska ===
Legislative results

Nebraska is the only U.S. state with a unicameral legislature; half of the seats of the Nebraska Legislature were up for election in 2024. Nebraska's legislature is officially non-partisan and holds non-partisan elections, although the Democratic and Republican parties each endorse legislative candidates. Republicans gained a supermajority in the chamber earlier in the year when a socially-conservative Democrat switched parties, and Republican-endorsed candidates maintained it in the election, allowing them to overcome a legislative filibuster to pass legislation without Democratic support.

Nebraska Legislature
Party	Before	After	Change
Republican	33	33	Steady
Democratic	15	15	Steady
Independent	1	1	Steady
Total	49	49	Steady

=== Nevada ===
Senate results

Assembly results

Half of the seats of the Nevada Senate and all of the seats of the Nevada Assembly were up for election in 2024. Democrats maintained control of both chambers despite strong Republican performances statewide, a result attributed by both parties to gerrymandering that took place when Democrats fully controlled the state government in 2021. Republicans did gain one seat in the Assembly, breaking the chamber's Democratic supermajority and strengthening the veto power of Republican governor Joe Lombardo.

Nevada Senate
Party	Leader	Before	After	Change
Democratic	Nicole Cannizzaro	13	13	Steady
Republican	Robin Titus	8	8	Steady
Total		21	21	Steady

Nevada Assembly
Party	Leader	Before	After	Change
Democratic	Steve Yeager	28	27	▼1
Republican	P. K. O'Neill	14	15	▲1
Total		42	42	Steady

=== New Hampshire ===
Senate results

House of Representatives results

All of the seats of the New Hampshire Senate and the New Hampshire House of Representatives were up for election in 2024. Despite Democratic victories in the state at the federal level, state Republicans performed very well, expanding their majorities in both legislative chamber and attaining a supermajority in the Senate despite Democratic hopes of flipping the House and making gains in the Senate.

New Hampshire Senate
Party	Leader	Before	After	Change
Republican	Jeb Bradley (retired)	14	16	▲2
Democratic	Donna Soucy (defeated)	10	8	▼2
Total		24	24	Steady

New Hampshire House of Representatives
Party	Leader	Before	After	Change
Republican	Sherman Packard	202	222	▲20
Democratic	Matthew Wilhelm	195	178	▼17
Independent	—	3	0	▼3
Total		400	400	Steady

=== New Mexico ===
Senate results

House of Representatives results

All of the seats of the New Mexico Senate and the New Mexico House of Representatives were up for election in 2024. Progressive Democrats made gains in the state's primary election, although a number of conservative Democratic incumbents still held onto their seats. In the general election, Republicans gained one seat in each chamber, although Democrats still maintained their majorities.

New Mexico Senate
Party	Leader	Before	After	Change
Democratic	Mimi Stewart	27	26	▼1
Republican	Gregory A. Baca (retired)	15	16	▲1
Total		42	42	Steady

New Mexico House of Representatives
Party	Leader	Before	After	Change
Democratic	Javier Martínez	45	44	▼1
Republican	Rod Montoya	25	26	▲1
Total		70	70	Steady

=== New York ===
Senate results

House of Representatives results

All of the seats of the New York State Senate and the New York State Assembly were up for election in 2024. Democrats maintained control of both chambers, but Republicans gained one seat in the Senate, breaking the chamber's Democratic supermajority.

New York State Senate
Party	Leader	Before	After	Change
Democratic	Andrea Stewart-Cousins	42	41	▼1
Republican	Rob Ortt	21	22	▲1
Total		63	63	Steady

New York State Assembly
Party	Leader	Before	After	Change
Democratic	Carl Heastie	102	103	▲1
Republican	William Barclay	48	47	▼1
Total		150	150	Steady

=== North Carolina ===
Senate results

House of Representatives results

All of the seats of the North Carolina Senate and the North Carolina House of Representatives were up for election in 2024. Republicans had gained a supermajority in the legislature in 2023 after Democrat Tricia Cotham switched parties. Later in 2023, they drew new legislative district maps to replace ones imposed by the formerly Democratic-controlled state Supreme Court for the 2022 elections.

Republicans maintained control of both chambers, but Democrats gained one seat in the House, breaking its Republican supermajority. This greatly increased the veto power of incoming Democratic governor Josh Stein. Prior to the swearing-in of the new legislature, however, Republicans overrode the veto of outgoing governor Roy Cooper to strip numerous powers from statewide offices which Democrats had won in the 2024 election.

North Carolina Senate
Party	Leader	Before	After	Change
Republican	Phil Berger	30	30	Steady
Democratic	Dan Blue	20	20	Steady
Total		50	50	Steady

North Carolina House of Representatives
Party	Leader	Before	After	Change
Republican	Tim Moore (retired)	72	71	▼1
Democratic	Robert Reives	48	49	▲1
Total		120	120	Steady

=== North Dakota ===
Senate results (excluding special election)

House of Representatives results

Half of the seats of the North Dakota Senate and the North Dakota House of Representatives were up for election in 2024. In 2023, a federal judge had ordered the creation of a new district containing two Native American tribes which had previously been split into separate districts. Special elections were called for the new district in both the House and Senate. Native American Democrats flipped these seats but the party lost elsewhere in the state, resulting in a net loss in the House. Republicans maintained supermajority control of both chambers.

North Dakota Senate
Party	Leader	Before	After	Change
Republican	Donald Schaible	43	42	▼1
Democratic-NPL	Kathy Hogan	4	5	▲1
Total		47	47	Steady

North Dakota House of Representatives
Party	Leader	Before	After	Change
Republican	Dennis Johnson (retired)	82	83	▲1
Democratic-NPL	Zac Ista	12	11	▼1
Total		94	94	Steady

=== Ohio ===
Senate results

House of Representatives results

Half of the seats of the Ohio Senate and all of the seats of the Ohio House of Representatives were up for election in 2024. The elections took place on new maps passed by Ohio's bipartisan redistricting commission after the state Supreme Court had repeatedly struck down the legislature's maps in the leadup to the 2022 election. The maps passed the commission unanimously, ensuring their effectiveness through the end of the decade. While the new maps were more favorable to Democrats than previous ones, Republicans still held a significant electoral advantage on them.

Republicans maintained control of both chambers, but Democrats made minor gains in each, reducing Republicans' supermajority in the House. Although Ohio Republicans won enough seats to overturn a gubernatorial veto, they no longer held the two-thirds majority needed in the House to unilaterally craft legislation.

Ohio Senate
Party	Leader	Before	After	Change
Republican	Matt Huffman (term-limited)	26	24	▼2
Democratic	Nickie Antonio	7	9	▲2
Total		33	33	Steady

Ohio House of Representatives
Party	Leader	Before	After	Change
Republican	Jason Stephens	67	65	▼2
Democratic	Allison Russo	32	34	▲2
Total		99	99	Steady

=== Oklahoma ===
Senate results

House of Representatives results

Half of the seats of the Oklahoma Senate and all of the seats of the Oklahoma House of Representatives were up for election in 2024. Multiple Republican floor leaders lost in the primary election, as the far-right wing of the Republican party continued to gain ground in the legislature. The top three most powerful leaders in each chamber all either lost renomination or were term-limited, leading to a complete turnover in leadership. Republicans maintained control of both chambers in the general election, with no seats changing hands between the two parties.

Oklahoma Senate
Party	Leader	Before	After	Change
Republican	Greg Treat (term-limited)	40	40	Steady
Democratic	Kay Floyd (term-limited)	8	8	Steady
Total		48	48	Steady

Oklahoma House of Representatives
Party	Leader	Before	After	Change
Republican	Charles McCall (term-limited)	81	81	Steady
Democratic	Cyndi Munson	20	20	Steady
Total		101	101	Steady

=== Oregon ===
Senate results

House of Representatives results

Half of the seats of the Oregon State Senate and all of the seats of the Oregon House of Representatives were up for election in 2024. Six of the Republican Senators who were up for re-election were disqualified from the ballot over their participation in a 2023 legislative walkout. Democrats maintained control of both chambers, gaining a supermajority in the Senate by flipping the seat of one of the disqualified Republicans. Democrats flipped a seat in the House as well in a narrow upset, gaining a supermajority in that chamber as well.

Oregon State Senate
Party	Leader	Before	After	Change
Democratic	Rob Wagner	17	18	▲1
Republican	Daniel Bonham	11	12	▲1
Oregon Independent	Brian Boquist (disqualified) (Note: Per Oregon Ballot Measure 113, Boquist exceeded the ten allotted unexcused absences allowed before being barred from running for reelection.)	1	0	▼1
Independent Republican	—	1	0	▼1
Total		30	30	Steady

Oregon House of Representatives
Party	Leader	Before	After	Change
Democratic	Julie Fahey	35	36	▲1
Republican	Jeff Helfrich	25	24	▼1
Total		60	60	Steady

=== Pennsylvania ===
Senate results

House of Representatives results

Half of the seats of the Pennsylvania State Senate and all of the seats of the Pennsylvania House of Representatives were up for election in 2024. In 2022, Democrats had won control of the House for the first time since 2008, although they could not seat their majority until February due to post-election vacancies. The divided legislature faced significant partisan gridlock, passing the fewest laws in over a decade and failing to pass six pending constitutional amendments that required approval from two consecutive sessions. In the general election, there was no net change in seat composition in either chamber, leaving Republicans with control of the Senate and Democrats with control of the House.

Pennsylvania State Senate
Party	Leader	Before	After	Change
Republican	Kim Ward	28	28	Steady
Democratic	Jay Costa	22	22	Steady
Total		50	50	Steady

Pennsylvania House of Representatives
Party	Leader	Before	After	Change
Democratic	Joanna McClinton	102	102	Steady
Republican	Bryan Cutler	101	101	Steady
Total		203	203	Steady

=== Rhode Island ===
Senate results

House of Representatives results

All of the seats of the Rhode Island Senate and the Rhode Island House of Representatives were up for election in 2024. Democrats retained their supermajorites in both legislative chambers, ousting one incumbent in the Senate. No other incumbent lost re-election, with Republicans' net gain in the House coming from open seats. Most races were uncontested in the general election.

Rhode Island Senate
Party	Leader	Before	After	Change
Democratic	Dominick J. Ruggerio	33	34	▲1
Republican	Jessica de la Cruz	5	4	▼1
Total		38	38	Steady

Rhode Island House of Representatives
Party	Leader	Before	After	Change
Democratic	Joe Shekarchi	65	64	▼1
Republican	Michael Chippendale	9	10	▲1
Independent	Michael Chippendale	1	1	Steady
Total		75	75	Steady

=== South Carolina ===
Senate results

House of Representatives results

All of the seats of the South Carolina Senate and the South Carolina House of Representatives were up for election in 2024. The House underwent minor redistricting to settle racial gerrymandering claims against a district. Republicans made considerable gains in the Senate, narrowly flipping four Democratic-held seats to establish a supermajority in the chamber while maintaining their supermajority in the House.

South Carolina Senate
Party	Leader	Before	After	Change
Republican	Thomas C. Alexander	30	34	▲4
Democratic	Brad Hutto	15	12	▼3
Independent	Mia McLeod	1	0	▼1
Total		46	46	Steady

South Carolina House of Representatives
Party	Leader	Before	After	Change
Republican	Murrell Smith Jr.	88	88	Steady
Democratic	Todd Rutherford	36	36	Steady
Total		124	124	Steady

=== South Dakota ===
Senate results

House of Representatives results

All of the seats of the South Dakota Senate and the South Dakota House of Representatives were up for election in 2024. About a dozen incumbent Republicans lost renomination in the primary election, primarily due to their support for a controversial carbon capture pipeline project. Challengers supported expanding the rights of property owners and were generally more conservative than the incumbents. In the general election, Republicans expanded their supermajorities by flipping one seat in each chamber. The newly elected legislators nominated more hardline conservatives to leadership positions in each chamber.

South Dakota Senate
Party	Leader	Before	After	Change
Republican	Lee Schoenbeck (retired)	31	32	▲1
Democratic	Reynold Nesiba (term-limited)	4	3	▼1
Total		35	35	Steady

South Dakota House of Representatives
Party	Leader	Before	After	Change
Republican	Hugh Bartels (term-limited)	63	64	▲1
Democratic	Oren Lesmeister (term-limited)	7	6	▼1
Total		70	70	Steady

=== Tennessee ===
Senate results

House of Representatives results

Half of the seats of the Tennessee Senate and all of the seats of the Tennessee House of Representatives were up for election in 2024. A universal school voucher proposal from governor Bill Lee loomed over the Republican primary with mixed results. Some voucher opponents lost renomination, while others defeated their challengers. Democrats sought to use their own opposition to vouchers to bolster their general election campaign. These gains never materialized, however, as no seat changed partisan control, allowing Republicans to maintain their supermajorities in the legislature.

Tennessee Senate
Party	Leader	Before	After	Change
Republican	Randy McNally	27	27	Steady
Democratic	Raumesh Akbari	6	6	Steady
Total		33	33	Steady

Tennessee House of Representatives
Party	Leader	Before	After	Change
Republican	Cameron Sexton	75	75	Steady
Democratic	Karen Camper	24	24	Steady
Total		99	99	Steady

=== Texas ===
Senate results

House of Representatives results

Half of the seats of the Texas Senate and all of the seats of the Texas House of Representatives were up for election in 2024. House Republicans experienced considerable intraparty strife over issues such as school vouchers and the 2023 impeachment of Ken Paxton, the state's attorney general. Retirements and primary battles left over 30 seats open for the general election. Republicans made minor gains in both legislative chambers, flipping two House seats and one Senate seat in the heavily Hispanic and historically-Democratic Rio Grande Valley.

The elected legislature would eventually pass school voucher legislation among many other conservative priorities. Later, they would pass legislation to redraw the state's congressional districts at the request of Donald Trump, kicking off a nationwide flurry of mid-decade redistricting.

Texas Senate
Party	Leader	Before	After	Change
Republican	Charles Schwertner	19	20	▲1
Democratic	Carol Alvarado	12	11	▼1
Total		31	31	Steady

Texas House of Representatives
Party	Leader	Before	After	Change
Republican	Dade Phelan	87	88	▲1
Democratic	Trey Martinez Fischer	63	62	▼1
Total		150	150	Steady

=== Utah ===
Senate results

House of Representatives results

Half of the seats of the Utah State Senate and all of the seats of the Utah House of Representatives were up for election in 2024. Republicans maintained supermajority control of both chambers as neither experienced a net change in partisan composition.

Utah Senate
Party	Leader	Before	After	Change
Republican	J. Stuart Adams	23	23	Steady
Democratic	Luz Escamilla	6	6	Steady
Total		29	29	Steady

Utah House of Representatives
Party	Leader	Before	After	Change
Republican	Mike Schultz	61	61	Steady
Democratic	Angela Romero	14	14	Steady
Total		75	75	Steady

=== Vermont ===
Senate results

House of Representatives results

All of the seats of the Vermont Senate and the Vermont House of Representatives were up for election in 2024. Republicans made significant gains in both legislative chambers, breaking the Democratic supermajorities in each. Democrats lost more legislative seats in Vermont than in any other state in the country despite Kamala Harris' landslide victory in the state in the concurrent presidential election. Republican governor Phil Scott, who also won re-election in a landslide, campaigned heavily for downballot Republicans, tapping into voter discontent with issues such as housing affordability, school funding, and rising taxes.

Vermont Senate
Party	Leader	Before	After	Change
Democratic	Philip Baruth	22	16	▼6
Republican	Randy Brock	7	13	▲6
Progressive	Tanya Vyhovsky	1	1	Steady
Total		30	30	Steady

Vermont House of Representatives
Party	Leader	Before	After	Change
Democratic	Jill Krowinski	105	87	▼18
Republican	Patricia McCoy	37	56	▲19
Progressive	Taylor Small (retired)	4	4	Steady
Independent	—	3	3	Steady
Libertarian	Jarrod Sammis	1	0	▼1
Total		150	150	Steady

=== Washington ===
Senate results

House of Representatives results

Half of the seats of the Washington State Senate and all of the seats of the Washington House of Representatives were up for election in 2024. Minor, but highly controversial, redistricting took place in central Washington after a federal judge ordered it over allegations of dilution of Hispanic voting power in the region. Despite one of the newly redrawn districts ostensibly favoring Democrats much more than before, Republicans swept the Senate and both House races in the district, leading to no net change as a result of the redistricting. Democrats made gains in other parts of the state, however, flipping one seat in each chamber.

Washington State Senate
Party	Leader	Before	After	Change
Democratic	Karen Keiser	29	30	▲1
Republican	John Braun	20	19	▼1
Total		49	49	Steady

Washington House of Representatives
Party	Leader	Before	After	Change
Democratic	Laurie Jinkins	58	59	▲1
Republican	Drew Stokesbary	40	39	▼1
Total		98	98	Steady

=== West Virginia ===
Senate results

House of Delegates results

Half of the seats of the West Virginia Senate and all of the seats of the West Virginia House of Delegates were up for election in 2024. Republicans expanded their supermajorities in both legislative chambers, flipping three open Democratic-held seats in the general election.

West Virginia Senate
Party	Leader	Before	After	Change
Republican	Craig Blair (lost renomination)	31	32	▲1
Democratic	Mike Woelfel	3	2	▼1
Total		34	34	Steady

West Virginia House of Delegates
Party	Leader	Before	After	Change
Republican	Roger Hanshaw	89	91	▲2
Democratic	Sean Hornbuckle	11	9	▼2
Total		100	100	Steady

=== Wisconsin ===
Senate results

State Assembly results

Half of the seats of the Wisconsin Senate and all of the seats of the Wisconsin State Assembly were up for election in 2024. Redistricting ordered by the Wisconsin Supreme Court completely reshuffled the state's legislative districts, leaving dozens of seats across both chambers with no incumbents. The new maps were considered more favorable to Democrats than the previous maps. Aided by this favorable redistricting, Democrats made significant gains in both legislative chambers, breaking the supermajority in the Senate, though Republicans still maintained legislative control.

Wisconsin Senate
Party	Leader	Before	After	Change
Republican	Devin LeMahieu	22	18	▼4
Democratic	Dianne Hesselbein	11	15	▲4
Total		33	33	Steady

Wisconsin State Assembly
Party	Leader	Before	After	Change
Republican	Robin Vos	64	54	▼10
Democratic	Greta Neubauer	35	45	▲10
Total		99	99	Steady

=== Wyoming ===
Senate results

House of Representatives results

Half of the seats of the Wyoming Senate and all of the seats of the Wyoming House of Representatives were up for election in 2024. The far-right freedom caucus of the Wyoming Republican Party ousted several incumbents in the Republican primaries. In the general election, despite a Democratic gain in a majority-native district, the freedom caucus won a majority of seats in the House of Representatives. The Republican supermajority in the Senate remained unchanged.

Wyoming Senate
Party	Leader	Before	After	Change
Republican	Ogden Driskill	29	29	Steady
Democratic	Chris Rothfuss	2	2	Steady
Total		31	31	Steady

Wyoming House of Representatives
Party	Leader	Before	After	Change
Republican	Albert Sommers (retired)	57	56	▼1
Democratic	Mike Yin	5	6	▲1
Total		62	62	Steady

== Territorial and federal district summaries ==
=== American Samoa ===
All of the seats of the American Samoa Senate and the American Samoa House of Representatives were up for election in 2024. Members of the Senate serve four-year terms, while members of the House of Representatives serve two-year terms. Gubernatorial and legislative elections are conducted on a nonpartisan basis in American Samoa.

=== Guam ===
All of the seats of the unicameral Legislature of Guam were up for election in 2024 for two-year terms. Republicans won control of the legislature for the first time since 2006.

Guam Legislature
Party	Leader	Before	After	Change
Republican	Frank Blas	6	9	▲3
Democratic	Therese M. Terlaje	9	6	▼3
Total		15	15	Steady

=== Northern Mariana Islands ===
A portion of the seats of the Northern Mariana Islands Senate, and all of the seats of the Northern Mariana Islands House of Representatives, were up for election in 2024. Members of the Senate serve either four-year terms, while members of the House serve two-year terms.

Northern Mariana Islands Senate
Party	Leader	Before	After	Change
Republican	Francisco Cruz	4	4	Steady
Independent	Corina Magofna	3	3	Steady
Democratic	Edith DeLeon Guerrero	2	2	Steady
Total		9	9	Steady

Northern Mariana Islands House of Representatives
Party	Leader	Before	After	Change
Independent	Edmund Villagomez	13	16	▲3
Democratic	Ed Propst (retired)	4	2	▼2
Republican	Patrick San Nicolas	3	2	▼1
Total		20	20	Steady

=== Puerto Rico ===
All of the seats of the Senate of Puerto Rico and the House of Representatives of Puerto Rico were up for election in 2024. Members of both chambers serve four-year terms. The New Progressive Party won control of the legislature from the Popular Democratic Party.

Puerto Rico Senate
Party	Leader	Before	After	Change
New Progressive	Thomas Rivera Schatz	10	19	▲9
Popular Democratic	José Luis Dalmau	12	5	▼7
Puerto Rican Independence	María de Lourdes Santiago	1	2	▲1
Project Dignity	Joanne Rodríguez Veve	1	1	Steady
Independent	Vargas Vidot	1	1	Steady
Citizen's Victory Movement	Ana Irma Rivera Lassén (retired)	2	0	▼2
Total		27	28	▲1

Puerto Rico House of Representatives
Party	Leader	Before	After	Change
New Progressive	Carlos Johnny Méndez	21	36	▲15
Popular Democratic	Tatito Hernández (retired)	25	13	▼12
Puerto Rican Independence	Denis Márquez Lebrón	1	1	Steady
Project Dignity	Lisie Burgos Muñiz	1	1	Steady
Citizen's Victory Movement	Mariana Nogales Molinelli	2	0	▼2
Independent	Luis Raúl Torres Cruz	1	0	▼1
Total		51	51	Steady

=== U.S. Virgin Islands ===
All of the seats of the unicameral Legislature of the Virgin Islands were up for election in 2024. All members of the legislature serve a two-year term.

Virgin Islands Legislature
Party	Leader	Before	After	Change
Democratic	Novelle Francis	11	12	▲1
Independent	Dwayne DeGraff	4	3	▼1
Total		15	15	Steady

=== Washington, D.C. ===
The Council of the District of Columbia serves as the legislative branch of the federal district of Washington, D.C. Half of the council seats were up for election in 2024. Council members serve four-year terms.

District of Columbia Council
Party	Leader	Before	After	Change
Democratic	Phil Mendelson	11	11	Steady
Independent		2	2	Steady
Total		13	13	Steady

== Special elections ==
Total net change in legislative seats due to special elections in 2024: +1 Rep seat / +1 Dem seat +2 Dem seats

There were fifty-four state legislative special elections scheduled for 2024. Democrats gained a net of one seat in special elections prior to the November general election, picking up a seat in the Alabama House of Representatives and the Florida House of Representatives. Republicans gained one seat in the New Hampshire House of Representatives as well. Democrats gained a seat in the North Dakota House of Representatives and a seat in the North Dakota Senate in elections that were held concurrently with the general election.

Additional special elections proved decisive in determining control of multiple legislative chambers. Special election victories enabled Democrats to retain control of the Michigan House of Representatives and the Pennsylvania House of Representatives multiple times throughout the year. Republicans additionally maintained control of the New Hampshire House of Representatives through the numerous special elections held in the state. A competitive November special election in for the Minnesota Senate, which did not hold regularly scheduled elections in 2024, reaffirmed Democrats' control of that chamber through the 2026 election.

=== Alabama ===
District		Incumbent			This race	
Chamber	No.	Representative	Party	First elected	Results	Candidates
House	16	Kyle South	Republican	2014	Incumbent resigned June 30, 2023, to become president and CEO of the Chamber of Commerce of West Alabama. New member elected January 9, 2024. Republican hold.	▌ ✓ Bryan Brinyark (Republican) 83.4%; ▌John Underwood (Democratic) 16.5%
House	55	Fred Plump	Democratic	2022	Incumbent resigned May 23, 2023, after being charged with conspiracy to commit wire fraud and obstruction of justice. New member elected outright after the January 9, 2024, special election was cancelled. Democratic hold.	▌ ✓ Travis Hendrix (Democratic)
House	10	David Cole	Republican	2022	Incumbent resigned August 31, 2023, after being charged with voter fraud. New member elected March 26, 2024. Democratic gain.	▌ ✓ Marilyn Lands (Democratic) 62.3%; ▌Teddy Powell (Republican) 37.5%
Senate	9	Clay Scofield	Republican	2010	Incumbent resigned October 30, 2023, to become executive vice president of the Business Council of Alabama. New member elected outright after the April 23, 2024, special election was cancelled. Republican hold.	▌ ✓ Wes Kitchens (Republican)
House	27	Wes Kitchens	Republican	2018	Incumbent resigned January 23, 2024, to join the State Senate. New member elected outright after the July 16, 2024, special election was cancelled. Republican hold.	▌ ✓ Jeana Ross (Republican)
House	52	John Rogers	Democratic	1982	Incumbent resigned March 13, 2024, after being charged with conspiracy to commit mail and wire fraud and conspiracy to obstruct justice. New member elected October 1, 2024. Democratic hold.	▌ ✓ Kelvin Datcher (Democratic) 84.3%; ▌Erskine Brown Jr. (Republican) 15.7%

=== Connecticut ===
District		Incumbent			This race	
Chamber	No.	Representative	Party	First elected	Results	Candidates
House	115	Dorinda Keenan Borer	Democratic	2017 (special)	Incumbent resigned December 2, 2023, to become mayor of West Haven. New member elected January 23, 2024. Democratic hold.	▌ ✓ Bill Heffernan (Democratic) 55.7%; ▌Silvana Apicella (Republican) 22.7%; ▌Ed O'Brien (Independent) 21.6%

=== Florida ===
District		Incumbent			This race	
Chamber	No.	Representative	Party	First elected	Results	Candidates
House	35	Fred Hawkins	Republican	2020	Incumbent resigned June 30, 2023, to become president of South Florida State College. New member elected January 16, 2024. Democratic gain.	▌ ✓ Tom Keen (Democratic) 51.3%; ▌Erika Booth (Republican) 48.7%
Senate	24	Bobby Powell	Democratic	2016	Incumbent resigned November 4, 2024, to run for Palm Beach County Commission. New member elected outright after the November 5, 2024, special election was cancelled. Democratic hold.	▌ ✓ Mack Bernard (Democratic)

=== Georgia ===
District		Incumbent			This race	
Chamber	No.	Representative	Party	First elected	Results	Candidates
House	125	Barry Fleming	Republican	2012	Incumbent resigned January 9, 2024, to become a Columbia Judicial District Superior Court judge. New member elected March 12, 2024, after no one received over 50% of the vote on February 13, 2024. Republican hold.	▌ ✓ Gary Richardson (Republican) 60.2%; ▌CJ Pearson (Republican) 39.8%
Senate	30	Mike Dugan	Republican	2012	Incumbent resigned January 3, 2024, to focus on his campaign for Georgia's 3rd congressional district. New member elected February 13, 2024. Republican hold.	▌ ✓ Tim Bearden (Republican) 58.9%; ▌Ashley Kecskes Godwin (Democratic) 17.2%; ▌Bob Smith (Republican) 12.8%; ▌Renae Bell (Republican) 11.2%
House	139	Richard H. Smith	Republican	2004	Incumbent died January 30, 2024, from influenza. New member elected May 7, 2024, after no one received over 50% of the vote on April 9, 2024. Republican hold.	▌ ✓ Carmen Rice (Republican) 55.8%; ▌Sean Knox (Republican) 44.2%

=== Hawaii ===
District		Incumbent			This race	
Chamber	No.	Representative	Party	First elected	Results	Candidates
Senate	5	Gilbert Keith-Agaran	Democratic	2013 (appointed)	Incumbent resigned October 31, 2023, to focus on litigation about the 2023 Hawaii wildfires. Interim appointee elected outright after the November 5, 2024, special election was cancelled. (Note: Troy Hashimoto was appointed as interim senator on November 9, 2023.); Democratic hold.	▌ ✓ Troy Hashimoto (Democratic)

=== Illinois ===
District		Incumbent			This race	
Chamber	No.	Representative	Party	First elected	Results	Candidates
Senate	5	Patricia Van Pelt	Democratic	2012	Incumbent resigned August 1, 2023, due to health issues. Interim appointee elected November 5, 2024. (Note: Lakesia Collins was appointed as interim senator on August 16, 2023.); Democratic hold.	▌ ✓ Lakesia Collins (Democratic)
Senate	20	Cristina Pacione-Zayas	Democratic	2020 (appointed)	Incumbent resigned May 31, 2023, to become Chicago mayor Brandon Johnson's deputy chief of staff. New member elected November 5, 2024. (Note: Natalie Toro was appointed as interim senator on July 11, 2023.); Democratic hold.	▌ ✓ Graciela Guzmán (Democratic) 81.2%; ▌Jason Proctor (Republican) 18.8%
Senate	27	Ann Gillespie	Democratic	2018	Incumbent resigned April 14, 2024, after being appointed as director of the Illinois Department of Insurance. Interim appointee elected November 5, 2024. (Note: Mark L. Walker was appointed as interim senator on May 11, 2024.); Democratic hold.	▌ ✓ Mark L. Walker (Democratic) 57.6%; ▌Tom Schlenhardt (Republican) 42.5%
Senate	53	Jason Barickman	Republican	2012	Incumbent resigned January 11, 2023, due to increased work obligations outside of the legislature. New member elected November 5, 2024. (Note: Thomas M. Bennett was appointed as interim senator on January 9, 2023.); Republican hold.	▌ ✓ Chris Balkema (Republican)

=== Kentucky ===
District		Incumbent			This race	
Chamber	No.	Representative	Party	First elected	Results	Candidates
House	24	Brandon Reed	Republican	2016	Incumbent resigned January 15, 2024, to become executive director of the Kentucky Office of Agricultural Policy. New member elected March 19, 2024. Republican hold.	▌ ✓ Courtney Gilbert (Republican) 62.5%; ▌John Pennington (Democratic) 22.7%; ▌Craig Astor (write-in) 14.9%
House	26	Russell Webber	Republican	2012	Incumbent resigned January 2, 2024, to become deputy treasurer of Kentucky. New member elected March 19, 2024. Republican hold.	▌ ✓ Peyton Griffee (Republican)

=== Maine ===
District		Incumbent			This race	
Chamber	No.	Representative	Party	First elected	Results	Candidates
House	122	Lois Reckitt	Democratic	2016	Incumbent died October 30, 2023, of colon cancer. New member elected March 5, 2024. Democratic hold.	▌ ✓ Matthew D. Beck (Democratic) 74.4%; ▌Brendan Williams (Independent) 14.8%; ▌Tristram Howard (Independent) 10.8%

=== Massachusetts ===
District		Incumbent			This race	
Chamber	No.	Representative	Party	First elected	Results	Candidates
House	Worcester 6	Peter Durant	Republican	2011 (special)	Incumbent resigned November 29, 2023, to join the State Senate. New member elected March 5, 2024. Republican hold.	▌ ✓ John Marsi (Republican)

=== Michigan ===
District		Incumbent			This race	
Chamber	No.	Representative	Party	First elected	Results	Candidates
House	13	Lori Stone	Democratic	2018	Incumbent resigned November 19, 2023 to become mayor of Warren. New member elected April 16, 2024. Democratic hold.	▌ ✓ Mai Xiong (Democratic) 65.6%; ▌Ronald Singer (Republican) 34.4%
House	25	Kevin Coleman	Democratic	2018	Incumbent resigned November 13, 2023, to become mayor of Westland. New member elected April 16, 2024. Democratic hold.	▌ ✓ Peter Herzberg (Democratic) 59.6%; ▌Josh Powell (Republican) 38.3%; ▌Robert Stano (U.S. Taxpayers) 2.1%

=== Minnesota ===
District		Incumbent			This race	
Chamber	No.	Representative	Party	First elected	Results	Candidates
House	27B	Kurt Daudt	Republican	2010	Incumbent resigned February 11, 2024. New member elected March 19, 2024. Republican hold.	▌ ✓ Bryan Lawrence (Republican) 84.5%; ▌Brad Brown (DFL) 15.4%
Senate	45	Kelly Morrison	DFL	2022	Incumbent resigned June 6, 2024, to focus on her campaign for Minnesota's 3rd congressional district. New member elected November 5, 2024. Democratic hold.	▌ ✓ Ann Johnson Stewart (DFL) 52.4%; ▌Kathleen Fowke (Republican) 47.5%

=== New Hampshire ===
District		Incumbent			This race	
Chamber	No.	Representative	Party	First elected	Results	Candidates
House	Coos 1	Troy Merner	Republican	2016	Incumbent resigned September 19, 2023, after moving out of his district. New member elected January 23, 2024. Republican hold.	▌ ✓ Sean Durkin (Republican) 60.2%; ▌Cathleen Fountain (Democratic) 39.8%
House	Coos 6	William Hatch	Democratic	2006	Incumbent resigned September 18, 2023, due to health issues. New member elected January 23, 2024. Republican gain.	▌ ✓ Michael Murphy (Republican) 53.8%; ▌Edith Tucker (Democratic) 46.2%
House	Strafford 11	Hoy Menear	Democratic	2022	Incumbent died November 13, 2023. New member elected March 12, 2024. Democratic hold.	▌ ✓ Erik Johnson (Democratic) 66.2%; ▌Joseph E. Bazo (Republican) 33.8%
House	Rockingham 21	Robin Vogt	Democratic	2022	Incumbent resigned December 1, 2023, after moving out of his district. New member elected March 12, 2024. Democratic hold.	▌ ✓ Jennifer Mandelbaum (Democratic) 63.0%; ▌Carol Bush (Republican) 37.0%

=== New York ===
District		Incumbent			This race	
Chamber	No.	Representative	Party	First elected	Results	Candidates
Assembly	77	Latoya Joyner	Democratic	2014	Incumbent resigned January 8, 2024, to take a job outside of government. New member elected February 13, 2024. Democratic hold.	▌ ✓ Landon Dais (Democratic) 74.6%; ▌▌Norman McGill (Republican) 20.1%; ▌Write-in 5.3%

=== North Dakota ===
District		Incumbent			This race	
Chamber	No.	Representative(s)	Party	First elected	Results	Candidates
House	9 (2 seats)	Jayme Davis; Redistricted from District 9A	Democratic-NPL	2022	Special election called after District Judge Peter D. Welte held that North Dakota's legislative maps violated the Voting Rights Act. Members elected November 5, 2024. Democratic-NPL gain.	▌ ✓ Jayme Davis (Democratic-NPL) 32.2%; ▌ ✓ Collette Brown (Democratic-NPL) 24.4%; ▌David Brien (Republican) 24.1%; ▌Robert Graywater (Republican) 19.3%
House	15 (2 seats)	Kathy Frelich; Donna Henderson; Redistricted from District 9B	Republican	2022; 2022	Special election called after District Judge Peter D. Welte held that North Dakota's legislative maps violated the Voting Rights Act. Members re-elected November 5, 2024. Republican hold.	▌ ✓ Kathy Frelich (Republican) 56.2%; ▌ ✓ Donna Henderson (Republican) 42.9%
House	23	Scott Dyk	Republican	2022	Incumbent resigned April 7, 2024, due to family health issues. Interim appointee elected November 5, 2024. (Note: Dennis Nehring was appointed as interim representative on April 30, 2024.); Republican hold.	▌ ✓ Dennis Nehring (Republican) 83.7%; ▌Mark Casler (Democratic-NPL) 15.8%
Senate	9	Judy Estenson; Redistricted from District 15	Republican	2022	Special election called after District Judge Peter D. Welte held that North Dakota's legislative maps violated the Voting Rights Act. New member elected November 5, 2024. Democratic-NPL gain.	▌ ✓ Richard Marcellais (Democratic-NPL) 61.3%; ▌Judy Estenson (Republican) 38.6%
Senate	15	Kent Weston; Redistricted from District 9	Republican	2022	Special election called after District Judge Peter D. Welte held that North Dakota's legislative maps violated the Voting Rights Act. Member re-elected November 5, 2024. Republican hold.	▌ ✓ Kent Weston (Republican) 98.5%; ▌Write-in 1.5%

=== Ohio ===
District		Incumbent			This race	
Chamber	No.	Representative	Party	First elected	Results	Candidates
Senate	33	Michael Rulli	Republican	2018	Incumbent resigned June 12, 2024, after being elected to the U.S. House of Representatives. Interim appointee elected November 5, 2024. (Note: Alessandro Cutrona was appointed as interim senator on June 26, 2024.); Republican hold.	▌ ✓ Alessandro Cutrona (Republican) 60.9%; ▌Marty Hume (Democratic) 39.1%

=== Oklahoma ===
District		Incumbent			This race	
Chamber	No.	Representative	Party	First elected	Results	Candidates
House	39	Ryan Martinez	Republican	2016	Incumbent resigned September 1, 2023, after pleading guilty to driving while under the influence. New member elected February 13, 2024. Republican hold.	▌ ✓ Erick Harris (Republican) 50.4%; ▌Regan Raff (Democratic) 45.1%; ▌Richard Prawdzienski (Libertarian) 4.5%
Senate	46	Kay Floyd	Democratic	2014	Incumbent resigned November 13, 2024, due to term limits. New member elected November 5, 2024. Democratic hold.	▌ ✓ Mark Mann (Democratic) 60.4%; ▌Charles Barton (Republican) 34.3%; ▌David Pilchman (Independent) 5.3%
Senate	48	George E. Young	Democratic	2018	Incumbent resigned November 13, 2024. New member elected outright after the November 5, 2024, special election was cancelled. Democratic hold.	▌ ✓ Nikki Nice (Democratic)

=== Pennsylvania ===
District		Incumbent			This race	
Chamber	No.	Representative	Party	First elected	Results	Candidates
House	140	John Galloway	Democratic	2006	Incumbent resigned December 14, 2023, to become a district court judge. New member elected February 13, 2024. Democratic hold.	▌ ✓ Jim Prokopiak (Democratic) 67.8%; ▌Candace Cabanas (Republican) 32.2%
House	139	Joseph Adams	Republican	2022	Incumbent resigned February 9, 2024, due to urgent family medical needs. New member elected April 23, 2024. Republican hold.	▌ ✓ Jeffrey Olsommer (Republican) 60.3%; ▌Robin Skibber (Democratic) 39.7%
House	195	Donna Bullock	Democratic	2015 (special)	Incumbent resigned July 15, 2024, to become CEO of Project H.O.M.E. New member elected September 17, 2024. Democratic hold.	▌ ✓ Keith Harris (Democratic)
House	201	Stephen Kinsey	Democratic	2012	Incumbent resigned July 16, 2024. New member elected September 17, 2024. Democratic hold.	▌ ✓ Andre Carroll (Democratic)

=== South Carolina ===
District		Incumbent			This race	
Chamber	No.	Representative	Party	First elected	Results	Candidates
Senate	19	John L. Scott Jr.	Democratic	2008	Incumbent died August 13, 2023, from blood clot issues. New member elected January 2, 2024. Democratic hold.	▌ ✓ Tameika Isaac Devine (Democratic) 86.0%; ▌Kizzie Smalls (Republican) 9.7%; ▌Michael Addison (Forward) 2.7%; ▌Chris Nelums (United Citizens) 1.6%
House	109	Deon Tedder	Democratic	2020	Incumbent resigned November 7, 2023, to join the State Senate. New member elected April 2, 2024. Democratic hold.	▌ ✓ Tiffany Spann-Wilder (Democratic)

=== Texas ===
District		Incumbent			This race	
Chamber	No.	Representative	Party	First elected	Results	Candidates
House	2	Bryan Slaton	Republican	2020	Incumbent resigned May 8, 2023, after facing calls for his expulsion following a scandal involving an inappropriate relationship with an intern; he was subsequently expelled on May 9, 2023. New member elected January 30, 2024, after no one received over 50% of the vote on November 7, 2023. Republican hold.	▌ ✓ Jill Dutton (Republican) 50.4%; ▌Brent Money (Republican) 49.6%
Senate	15	John Whitmire	Democratic	1982	Incumbent resigned December 31, 2023 to become mayor of Houston. New member elected May 4, 2024. Democratic hold.	▌ ✓ Molly Cook (Democratic) 57.1%; ▌Jarvis Johnson (Democratic) 42.9%
House	56	Charles Anderson	Republican	2004	Incumbent resigned August 15, 2024. New member elected November 5, 2024. Republican hold.	▌ ✓ Pat Curry (Republican) 68.5%; ▌Erin Shank (Democratic) 31.5%

=== Utah ===
District		Incumbent			This race	
Chamber	No.	Representative	Party	First elected	Results	Candidates
Senate	12	Karen Mayne	Democratic	2007 (appointed)	Incumbent resigned January 16, 2023, due to health issues. Interim appointee elected November 5, 2024. (Note: Karen Kwan was appointed as interim senator on January 16, 2023.); Democratic hold.	▌ ✓ Karen Kwan (Democratic) 56.5%; ▌Judy Weeks-Rohner (Republican) 43.5%

=== Virginia ===
District		Incumbent			This race	
Chamber	No.	Representative	Party	First elected	Results	Candidates
House	48	Les Adams; Redistricted from the 16th district	Republican	2013	Incumbent resigned January 9, 2024. New member elected January 9, 2024. Republican hold.	▌ ✓ Eric Phillips (Republican) 69.6%; ▌Melody Cartwright (Democratic) 30.3%
Senate	9	Frank Ruff; Redistricted from the 15th district	Republican	2000 (special)	Incumbent resigned January 9, 2024, after being diagnosed with cancer. New member elected January 9, 2024. Republican hold.	▌ ✓ Tammy Brankley Mulchi (Republican) 62.8%; ▌Tina Wyatt-Younger (Democratic) 37.1%

=== Wisconsin ===
District		Incumbent			This race	
Chamber	No.	Representative	Party	First elected	Results	Candidates
Senate	4	Lena Taylor	Democratic	2004	Incumbent resigned January 26, 2024, to become a Milwaukee County Circuit Court judge. New member elected July 30, 2024. Democratic hold.	▌ ✓ Dora Drake (Democratic)

== See also ==
- 2024 United States presidential election
- 2024 United States Senate elections
- 2024 United States House of Representatives elections
- 2024 United States gubernatorial elections
