= Senator Traynor =

Senator Traynor may refer to:

- John T. Traynor (1926–2021), North Dakota State Senate
- Stuart J. Traynor (1919–2008), Illinois State Senate

== See also ==
- Patrick F. Trainor (1863–1902), New York State Senate
