= Duane Poitra =

American politician

Member-elect of the North Dakota House of Representatives from the 9th district
- Assuming office December 2026
- Succeeding: Jayme Davis

Personal details
- Party: Democratic

Duane Poitra is an American politician. A member of the Democratic Party, he is the member-elect for the 9th district of the North Dakota House of Representatives.
