= Vernon R. Laning =

American politician (born 1948)

Vernon Laning

Member of the North Dakota House of Representatives from the 8th district
- In office 2013–2020
- Succeeded by: Dave Nehring

Personal details
- Born: December 31, 1948 (age 77) Edgeley, North Dakota
- Party: Republican
- Spouse: Rose
- Children: four
- Education: North Dakota State University

Vernon R. Laning (born December 31, 1948) is an American politician. He has served as a Republican member for the 8th district in the North Dakota House of Representatives since 2013.

In 2017, while defending North Dakota's Blue Laws, Laning argued that under the system, his wallet gets "a half day off" from his wife's spending.
