= Duaine Espegard =

American politician

Member of the North Dakota Senate from the 43rd district
- In office December 1, 2000 – December 1, 2006
- Preceded by: Rod St. Aubyn
- Succeeded by: JoNell Bakke

Personal details
- Born: July 10, 1943 (age 83) Larimore, North Dakota
- Party: Republican

Duaine Espegard (born July 10, 1943) is an American politician who served in the North Dakota Senate from the 43rd district from 2000 to 2006.
