= Thomas Trenbeath =

American politician

Member of the North Dakota Senate from the 10th district
- In office December 1, 2000 – November 24, 2006
- Preceded by: Harvey Sand
- Succeeded by: Curtis Olafson

Personal details
- Born: July 23, 1948 (age 78) Neche, North Dakota
- Party: Republican

Thomas Trenbeath (born July 23, 1948) is an American politician who served in the North Dakota Senate from the 10th district from 2000 to 2006.
