= Corry Kenner =

American politician

Member-elect of the North Dakota House of Representatives from the 15th district
- Assuming office December 2026
- Succeeding: Donna Henderson

Personal details
- Party: Republican

Corry Kenner is an American politician. A member of the Republican Party, he is the member-elect for the 15th district of the North Dakota House of Representatives.
