= Dave Nehring =

American politician

Member of the North Dakota House of Representatives from the 8th district
- In office December 1, 2020 – December 7, 2022 Serving with Jeff Delzer
- Preceded by: Vernon R. Laning

Personal details
- Party: Republican

Dave Nehring is an American politician. He served as a Republican member for the 8th district of the North Dakota House of Representatives.

In 2020, Nehring won the election for the 8th district of the North Dakota House of Representatives. He succeeded Vernon R. Laning. Nehring assumed his office on December 1, 2020. He served as a candidate for the 8th district of the North Dakota Senate. In 2022, Nehring was defeated by Jeffery Magrum in the Republican primary election for the 8th district of the North Dakota Senate.
