= Rod St. Aubyn =

American politician

Member of the North Dakota Senate from the 43rd district
- In office December 1, 1994 – August 1, 2000
- Succeeded by: Duaine Espegard

Member of the North Dakota House of Representatives from the 43rd district
- In office December 1, 1990 – December 1, 1994

Personal details
- Party: Republican

Rod St. Aubyn is an American politician who served in the North Dakota House of Representatives from the 43rd district from 1990 to 1994 and in the North Dakota Senate from the 43rd district from 1994 to 2000.
