= Dennis Bercier =

American politician

Member of the North Dakota Senate from the 9th district
- In office December 1, 1998 – December 1, 2006
- Preceded by: Les LaFountain
- Succeeded by: Richard Marcellais

Personal details
- Born: December 12, 1952 Rolla, North Dakota
- Died: June 11, 2012 (aged 59) Belcourt, North Dakota
- Party: Democratic

Dennis Bercier (December 12, 1952 – June 11, 2012) was an American politician who served in the North Dakota Senate from the 9th district from 1998 to 2006.
