= Jayme Davis =

American politician

Member of the North Dakota House of Representatives
- Incumbent
- Assumed office December 1, 2022 Serving with Collette Brown
- Preceded by: Office established
- Succeeded by: Duane Poitra (elect)
- Constituency: 9A district (2022–2024); 9th district (2024–present)

Personal details
- Party: Democratic-NPL
- Education: University of Mary (BBA); Humphrey School of Public Affairs (MPA)

Jayme M. Davis is an American politician serving as a member of the North Dakota House of Representatives since 2022. Originally elected to represent district 9A, she has represented the reconstituted 9th district since 2024.

Davis has declared her candidacy in the 2026 North Dakota Senate election for the 9th legislative district, challenging incumbent Democratic–NPL senator Richard Marcellais. She defeated Marcellais in the primary on June 9, 2026.

== Personal life ==
Davis resides in Rolette, North Dakota. She is a citizen of the Turtle Mountain Band of Chippewa Indians.

== See also ==
- List of Native American politicians
- Native American women in politics
