= Sean Durkin (politician) =

American politician

Member of the New Hampshire House of Representatives from the Coos 1st district
- Incumbent
- Assumed office January 31, 2024
- Preceded by: Troy Merner
- Succeeded by: Sam Hoehn (elect)

Personal details
- Party: Republican

Sean Durkin is an American politician. He serves as a Republican member for the Coos 1st district of the New Hampshire House of Representatives.
