= Howard C. Anderson Jr. =

American politician

Member of the North Dakota Senate from the 8th district
- In office December 1, 2012 – December 1, 2022
- Preceded by: Layton Freborg
- Succeeded by: Jeffery Magrum

Personal details
- Party: Republican
- Spouse: Joan
- Children: 4
- Education: North Dakota State University

Howard C. Anderson Jr. is an American politician. He is a former member of the North Dakota Senate from the 8th District. He is a member of the Republican Party.
