= John T. Traynor =

American politician (1926–2021)

Member of the North Dakota Senate from the 15th district
- In office December 1, 1991 – December 1, 2006
- Succeeded by: Dave Oehlke

Personal details
- Born: November 19, 1926 Devils Lake, North Dakota
- Died: July 11, 2021 (aged 94) Devils Lake, North Dakota
- Party: Republican
- Profession: Lawyer

John T. Traynor (November 19, 1926 – July 11, 2021) was an American politician who was a member of the North Dakota State Senate. He represented the 15th district from 1991 to 2006 as a member of the Republican party. An attorney, he received his law degree at the University of North Dakota in 1951.

He died on July 11, 2021, in Devils Lake, North Dakota, at age 94.
