= Judy Estenson =

American politician

Member of the North Dakota Senate from the 15th district
- In office December 1, 2022 – January 3, 2025
- Preceded by: Dave Oehlke
- Succeeded by: Richard Marcellais

Personal details
- Party: Republican

Judy Estenson is an American politician. She served as a member of the North Dakota Senate from the 15th district. She is a member of the Republican Party.

Estenson has declared her candidacy in the 2026 North Dakota Senate election for the 15th legislative district, challenging incumbent Republican senator Kent Weston.
