= Troy Merner =

American politician

Member of the New Hampshire House of Representatives from the Coos 7th district
- In office 2016 – December 7, 2022

Member of the New Hampshire House of Representatives from the Coos 1st district
- In office December 7, 2022 – September 19, 2023
- Succeeded by: Sean Durkin

Personal details
- Party: Republican

Troy Merner is an American politician. He served as a Republican member for the Coos County 1st and 7th district of the New Hampshire House of Representatives.

== Life and career ==
Merner is a former ironworker.

Merner served in the New Hampshire House of Representatives from 2016 to 2023.

== Controversies and Legal Issues ==
=== Living outside of legislative district ===
In September 2023, an investigation by the New Hampshire Attorney General’s Office found that Merner may have lived outside the legislative district he represented for more than a year, potentially in violation of residency requirements for state representatives. The Attorney General’s report noted records indicating Merner had an address in a neighboring district while still serving in the House. Merner disputed aspects of the report but did not retain his seat.

=== Wrongful voting and theft by deception charges ===
In August 2024, Merner pleaded guilty to misdemeanor charges of wrongful voting and theft by deception in connection with the residency matter. As part of his plea agreement in Merrimack County Superior Court, a judge revoked his right to vote for life and ordered that he pay fines and court costs; the sentence did not include jail time. Independent reporting described the sentencing as part of efforts to hold elected officials accountable for compliance with residency and election laws.
