= Donna Henderson =

American politician

Member of the North Dakota House of Representatives
- Incumbent
- Assumed office December 1, 2022 Serving with Kathy Frelich
- Preceded by: Marvin Nelson
- Succeeded by: Corry Kenner (elect)
- Constituency: 9B district (2022–2024); 15th district (2024–present)

Personal details
- Party: Republican
- Spouse: Paul
- Children: 6
- Education: North Dakota State College of Science

Donna Henderson is an American politician. She has served as a member of the North Dakota House of Representatives since 2022. She originally represented district 9B but was redistricted to the 15th district in 2024. She is a member of the Republican Party.
