= Lonnie Laffen =

American politician and architect (1958–2020)

Member of the North Dakota Senate from the 43rd district
- In office December 1, 2010 – December 1, 2018
- Preceded by: JoNell Bakke
- Succeeded by: JoNell Bakke

Personal details
- Born: July 16, 1958 Wimbledon, North Dakota, United States
- Died: December 23, 2020 (aged 62) Grand Forks, North Dakota
- Party: Republican

Lonnie Laffen (July 16, 1958 – December 23, 2020) was an American politician and architect.

Laffen was born in Wimbledon, North Dakota. He received his bachelor's degree in architecture and history from North Dakota State University. Laffen was the founder & president of JLG Architects in Grand Forks, North Dakota. Laffen served in the North Dakota Senate from the 43rd District from 2010 to 2018. He was a member of the Republican party. In 2018, Laffen was defeated for re-election by Democrat JoNell Bakke.

He died of complications from a heart attack on December 23, 2020, in Grand Forks, North Dakota, at age 62.
