= Curtis Olafson =

American politician

Member of the North Dakota Senate from the 10th district
- In office December 2, 2006 – December 1, 2012
- Preceded by: Thomas Trenbeath
- Succeeded by: Joe Miller

Personal details
- Born: December 7, 1952 (age 73)
- Party: Republican

Curtis Olafson (born December 7, 1952) is an American politician who served in the North Dakota Senate from the 10th district from 2006 to 2012.
