= Kathy Frelich =

American politician

Member of the North Dakota House of Representatives from the 15th district
- Incumbent
- Assumed office December 1, 2022 Serving with Donna Henderson

Personal details
- Party: Republican

Kathy Frelich is an American politician. She is serving as a member of the North Dakota House of Representatives from the 15th district, alongside Donna Henderson. She is a member of the Republican Party.
