= Michelle Axtman =

American politician

Member of the North Dakota Senate from the 7th district
- Incumbent
- Assumed office December 1, 2022
- Preceded by: Nicole Poolman

Personal details
- Party: Republican
- Children: 2
- Education: United States Air Force Academy (BS); University of Mary (MS)

Military service
- Branch/service: United States Air Force
- Unit: 934th Airlift Wing

Michelle Axtman is an American politician and United States Air Force pilot serving as a member of the North Dakota Senate for the 7th district. She assumed office on December 1, 2022.

== Education ==
Axtman attended Century High School in Bismarck, North Dakota. She earned a Bachelor of Science degree in geospatial science from the United States Air Force Academy in 2009 and a Master of Science in project management from the University of Mary in 2013.

== Career ==
Axtman served as an active duty pilot in the United States Air Force and Air Force Reserve Command for 12 years, reaching the rank of major. Since 2021, she has served as the executive officer to the mission support group commander of the 934th Airlift Wing. She was elected to the North Dakota Senate in November 2022.
