= Erik Johnson (politician) =

American politician

Member of the New Hampshire House of Representatives from the Strafford 11th district
- Incumbent
- Assumed office March 27, 2024
- Preceded by: Hoy Menear

Personal details
- Party: Democratic

Erik Johnson is an American politician. He serves as a Democratic member for the Strafford 11th district of the New Hampshire House of Representatives.

He was elected in a by-election following the death of Hoy Menear.
