= Carolyn Nelson (politician) =

American politician

Member of the North Dakota Senate from the 21st district
- In office December 1, 1994 – December 1, 2018
- Succeeded by: Kathy Hogan

Personal details
- Born: October 8, 1937 (age 88) Madison, Wisconsin
- Party: North Dakota Democratic-NPL Party
- Spouse: Gilbert
- Education: North Dakota State University
- Profession: educator, sales consultant

Carolyn Nelson is a North Dakota Democratic-NPL Party member of the North Dakota Senate, representing the 21st district since 1994. She currently serves as Assistant Minority Leader. She was previously a member of the North Dakota House of Representatives, representing the 45th District from 1986 through 1988, and the 21st District from 1992 through 1994.

In Fall 2017, Nelson announced her intention to retire and not run for re-election in 2018.
