= Keith Boehm =

American politician

Member of the North Dakota Senate from the 33rd district
- Incumbent
- Assumed office December 1, 2022
- Preceded by: Jessica Unruh-Bell

Personal details
- Born: Bismarck, North Dakota, U.S.
- Party: Republican
- Spouse: Janelle
- Children: 8

Keith Boehm is an American politician. He is serving as a member of the North Dakota Senate from the 33rd district. He is a member of the Republican Party.

In April 2023, Boehm argued in support of House Bill 1254, which looked to ban gender-affirming care for transgender minors and impose felony charges on doctors who perform sex assignment surgeries. He falsely claimed that puberty blockers permanently sterilize children and referred to gender-affirming care as "child mutilation."
