= Hoy Menear =

American politician from New Hampshire

Member of the New Hampshire House of Representatives from the Strafford 11th district
- In office December 7, 2022 – November 13, 2023
- Succeeded by: Erik Johnson

Member of the New Hampshire House of Representatives from the Strafford 25th district
- In office 2012–2014

Personal details
- Born: October 4, 1938
- Died: November 9, 2023 (aged 85)
- Party: Democratic

Hoy Robert "Roger" Menear III (October 4, 1938 – November 9, 2023) was an American politician. He was a member of the New Hampshire House of Representatives until his death. He previously represented Strafford 25 from 2012 to 2014. He served on the House State-Federal Relations and Veterans Committee.
