= Randy Burckhard =

American politician

President pro tempore of the North Dakota Senate
- In office January 5, 2021 – April 14, 2021
- Preceded by: Oley Larsen
- Succeeded by: Larry Luick

Member of the North Dakota Senate from the 5th district
- Incumbent
- Assumed office January 4, 2011
- Preceded by: Tom Seymour

Personal details
- Born: 1952 (age 73–74) Rugby, North Dakota, U.S.
- Party: Republican
- Education: Minot State University (BA)

Randall A. "Randy" Burckhard (born June 5, 1952) is an American politician. He is a member of the North Dakota State Senate from the 5th District, serving since 2011. He is a member of the Republican party.

North Dakota Senate
Preceded by Oley Larsen	President pro tempore of the North Dakota Senate; 2021	Succeeded by Larry Luick
