= Terry Wanzek =

American politician and a member of the North Dakota State Senate

Member of the North Dakota Senate from the 29th district
- Incumbent
- Assumed office 2007

Personal details
- Born: March 28, 1957 (age 69) Jamestown, North Dakota, United States
- Party: Republican
- Education: Jamestown College

Terry Wanzek (born March 28, 1957) is an American politician. He is a member of the North Dakota State Senate from the 29th District, serving since 2007. He is a member of the Republican party. He also served in the Senate from 1995 to 2003, and in the House of Representatives from 1992 to 1994.
