= Nicole Poolman =

American politician

Member of the North Dakota Senate from the 7th district
- In office December 1, 2012 – December 1, 2022
- Preceded by: Ryan Taylor
- Succeeded by: Michelle Axtman

Personal details
- Party: Republican
- Spouse: Jim Poolman
- Children: 3
- Education: University of North Dakota (BS)
- Profession: Teacher

Nicole Poolman is a former Republican member of the North Dakota Senate, representing the 7th district. Poolman was first elected in 2012, defeating Democrat Warren Emmer. and subsequently elected to two more full terms running unopposed. In the 2016 North Dakota gubernatorial election, she was chosen the running mate for Attorney General Wayne Stenehjem. Poolman currently works as a high school English teacher in Bismarck.
