= Ronald Sorvaag =

American politician

Member of the North Dakota Senate from the 45th district
- Incumbent
- Assumed office 2011

Personal details
- Party: Republican
- Spouse: Carla
- Children: 2
- Education: BA, Sociology, Concordia College
- Website: https://www.legis.nd.gov/assembly/63-2013/members/senate/senator-ronald-sorvaag

Ronald Sorvaag is an American politician. He serves as a Republican member of the North Dakota Senate and has served as a state senator since 2011. He earned a B.A. in Sociology from Concordia College, has a wife Carla and two children.
