= JoNell Bakke =

American politician

Member of the North Dakota Senate from the 43rd district
- In office December 1, 2018 – December 1, 2022
- Preceded by: Lonnie Laffen
- Succeeded by: Jeff Barta
- In office December 1, 2006 – December 1, 2010
- Preceded by: Duaine Espegard
- Succeeded by: Lonnie Laffen

Personal details
- Party: Democratic–NPL
- Education: University of North Dakota (BS, M.Ed.)

JoNell Bakke is a former Democratic-NPL member of the North Dakota Senate from the 43rd district located in the Grand Forks area. Bakke previously served in the North Dakota Senate during the 60th Legislative Assembly from 2006 to 2010. A retired special education teacher, Bakke earned her Bachelor of Science and Master of Education at the University of North Dakota.

In the November 2018 election, Bakke defeated Senator Lonnie Laffen by six percentage points. In the November 2022 election, she lost reelection to Jeff Barta.

In June 2026, Bakke was elected to the Grand Forks School board, receiving 15.4% of the vote.
