= Dave Oehlke =

North Dakota senator

Member of the North Dakota Senate from the 15th District
- In office 2007 – December 1, 2022
- Preceded by: John T. Traynor
- Succeeded by: Judy Estenson

Personal details
- Born: Herman David Oehlke; March 1949 (age 77)
- Children: 2
- Education: Concordia College

Herman David Oehlke (born March 1949) is an American politician who served as a Republican member of the North Dakota Senate from the 15th District.

== Early life ==
Oehlke graduated in 1971 from Concordia College with a Bachelor of Arts in Business and Hospital Management.

== Personal life ==
Oehlke lives in Devils Lake, North Dakota with his wife, Vicki, with whom he has two children.
