= Oley Larsen =

American politician

President pro tempore of the North Dakota Senate
- In office April 18, 2019 – January 5, 2021
- Preceded by: David Hogue
- Succeeded by: Randy Burckhard

Member of the North Dakota Senate from the 3rd district
- In office December 1, 2010 – December 1, 2022
- Preceded by: Robert Horne
- Succeeded by: Bob Paulson

Personal details
- Born: Leverrett Oley Larsen; October 18, 1964 (age 61) Surrey, North Dakota, U.S.
- Party: Republican
- Education: Williston State College; Valley City State University (BS); North Dakota State University (MS)

Leverrett Oley Larsen (born October 18, 1964) is an American politician. He was a Republican member of the North Dakota Senate for the 3rd district.

== Early life ==
Larsen received a Bachelor of Science in Vocational Education from Valley City State University and a Masters of Science in Educational Leadership from North Dakota State University.

== Career ==
Larsen was a teacher of Automotive Technology at a local high school.

Larsen was a member of the North Dakota Senate from April 18, 2019 to January 5, 2021. He opposed to anti-bullying legislation, arguing that it would promote a victim mentality. He supported the right to bear arms in the workplace. Larsen was elected State Senate President Pro Tempore 2020. He was elected chairman of the Bastiat Caucus. He was a member of the Pro-Life caucus, National Prayer Caucus, and the Republican Party Caucus.

Currently, he is self-employed at Oley Larsen 4 Insurance Agency LLC specializing in health insurance and benefits. He also continues in the diesel technology field for a local sanitation company. Larsen has been published in Psychology Today.

== Personal life ==
He is married to Elizabeth Larsen, and they have two children. They live in Minot, North Dakota.

North Dakota Senate
Preceded by David Hogue	President pro tempore of the North Dakota Senate; 2019–2021	Succeeded by Randy Burckhard
