= Robert Fors =

North Dakota politician

Member of the North Dakota Senate from the 19th district
- In office December 1, 2018 – December 1, 2022
- Preceded by: Tom Campbell
- Succeeded by: Janne Myrdal

Personal details
- Party: Republican
- Children: 2

Military service
- Branch/service: United States Air Force

Robert O. Fors is an American politician who served as a member of the North Dakota Senate from the 19th district.

== Career ==
Fors previously served in the United States Air Force. A resident of Larimore, North Dakota, he served on the Larimore School Board. Fors was elected to the North Dakota Senate in November 2018 and assumed office on December 1, 2018. In the 2019–2020 legislative session, Fors served as vice chair of the Senate Education Committee. In the 2021–2022 session, he was vice chair of the Senate Transportation Committee.
