= Joan Heckaman =

American politician

Minority Leader of the North Dakota Senate
- In office December 5, 2016 – December 1, 2022
- Preceded by: Mac Schneider
- Succeeded by: Kathy Hogan

Member of the North Dakota Senate from the 23rd district
- In office December 1, 2006 – December 1, 2022
- Preceded by: Michael Every
- Succeeded by: Todd Beard

Personal details
- Born: May 30, 1946 (age 80) New Rockford, North Dakota, U.S.
- Party: Democratic
- Spouse: Duane
- Education: Valley City State University (BA); Minot State University (MA)

Joan Heckaman (born May 30, 1946) is a former North Dakota Democratic-NPL Party member of the North Dakota Senate, representing the 23rd district. She served as Senate Minority Leader from 2016 to 2022.

Heckaman was the Democratic-NPL nominee for lieutenant governor in 2016, running with Marvin Nelson. They lost the general election to Doug Burgum and Brent Sanford.

Party political offices
Preceded by Ellen Chaffee	Democratic nominee for Lieutenant Governor of North Dakota; 2016	Succeeded by Ben Vig
North Dakota Senate
Preceded by Mac Schneider	Minority Leader of the North Dakota Senate; 2016–2022	Succeeded by Kathy Hogan
