= Jessica Unruh-Bell =

American politician

Member of the North Dakota Senate from the 33rd district
- In office December 1, 2012 – December 1, 2022
- Preceded by: Randy Christmann
- Succeeded by: Keith Boehm

Personal details
- Born: 1983 or 1984 (age 41–42)
- Party: Republican
- Spouse: KC
- Children: 2
- Education: North Dakota State University (B.S.)
- Profession: Environmental specialist

Jessica Unruh-Bell is a former member of the North Dakota Senate, representing the 33rd district.

== Early life ==
Unruh-Bell was born and raised on a ranch North of Dodge, North Dakota. She graduated from Golden Valley High School in Golden Valley. She currently resides in Beulah, North Dakota, and works as an environmental specialist at Coteau Properties Company Freedom Mine.

== Political career ==
Unruh-Bell was first appointed to the Senate in 2012 to succeed Randy Christmann, who resigned from office before the 2013 session. She ran for a full term in 2014 and was re-elected. In 2016, she was selected to be a delegate to the Republican National Convention in Cleveland, Ohio.
