= Rich Wardner =

American politician

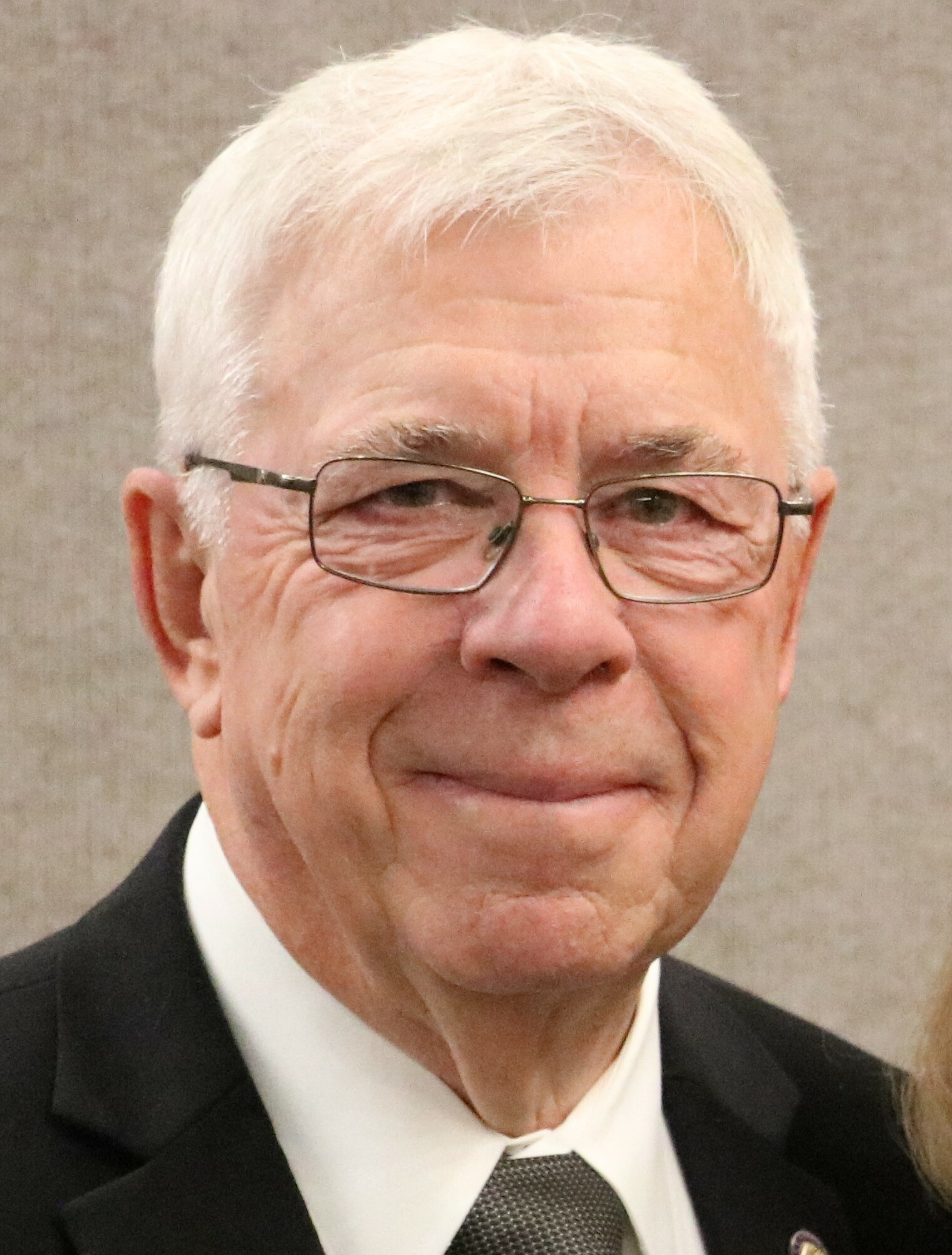
- Wardner in 2019

Majority Leader of the North Dakota Senate
- In office September 6, 2011 – December 1, 2022
- Preceded by: Bob Stenehjem
- Succeeded by: David Hogue

Member of the North Dakota Senate from the 37th district
- In office January 1999 – December 1, 2022
- Succeeded by: Dean Rummel

Member of the North Dakota House of Representatives
- In office January 1991 – January 1997

Personal details
- Born: August 26, 1942 (age 83) Bismarck, North Dakota, U.S.
- Party: Republican
- Education: Dickinson State University (BS); Northern State University (MS)

Rich Wardner (born August 26, 1942) is a former Republican member of the North Dakota Senate for the 37th district.

== Biography ==
He graduated from Dickinson State University and received a Master's of Science from Northern State University. He worked as a science and math teacher, a football and basketball coach, and a farmer.

From 1991 to 1997, he served in the North Dakota House of Representatives. Between 1999 and 2022, he has served in the North Dakota Senate. Following the death of state Senator Bob Stenehjem in July 2011, he served as the Senate Majority Leader.

He is the former executive director of the Dickinson Area Chamber of Commerce. He now serves as chairman of Sunrise Youth Bureau and the Midwest Legislative Conference. He is a member of Legislative Management, the Benevolent and Protective Order of Elks, and Rotary International. In 1999, he received the Public Service Award from the North Dakota Petroleum Marketers Association.

He is married to Kayleen Wardner, and they have two children. They live in Dickinson, North Dakota.

North Dakota Senate
Preceded by Bob Stenehjem	Majority Leader of the North Dakota Senate; 2011–2022	Succeeded by David Hogue
