= Jeffery Magrum =

American politician

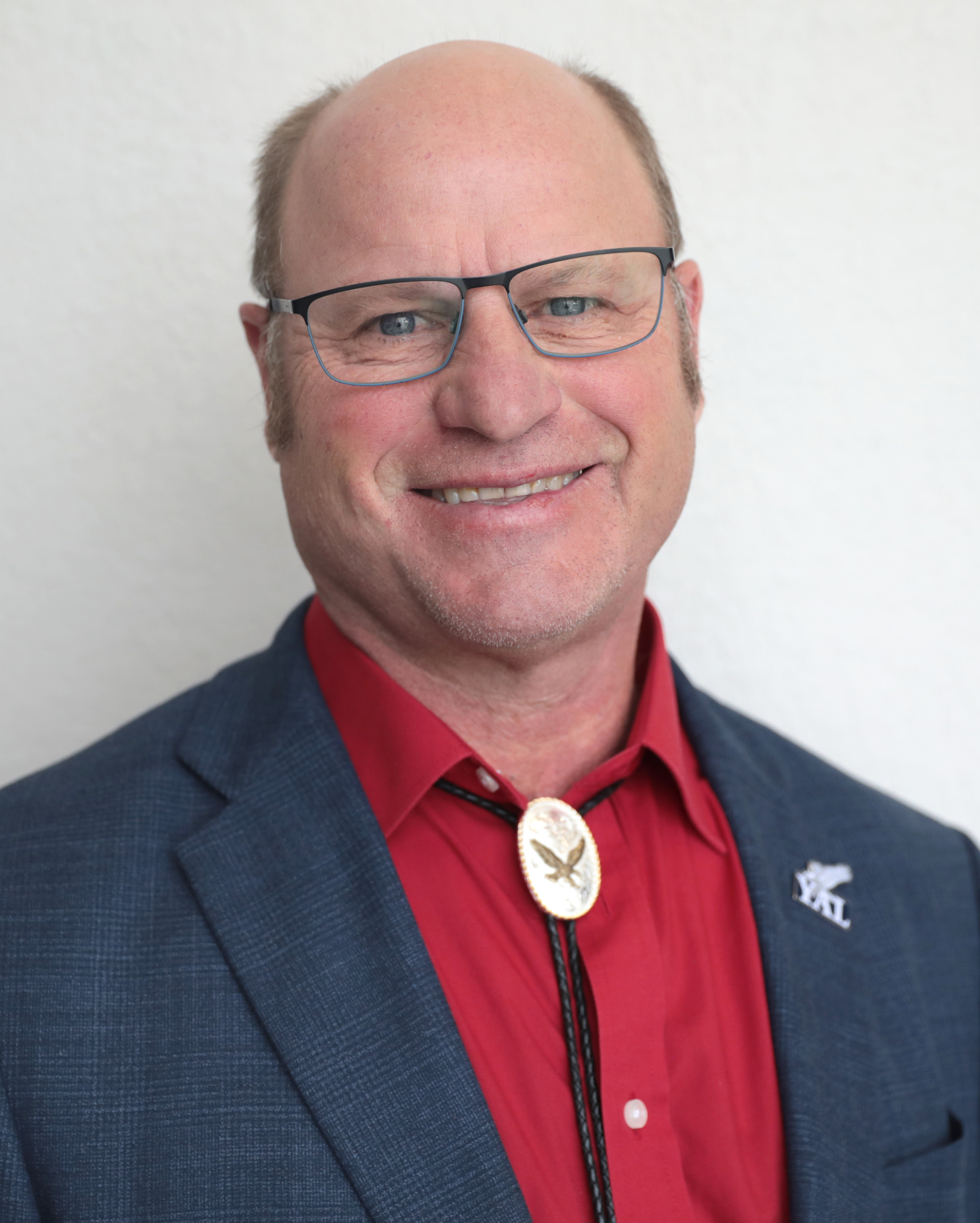

Member of the North Dakota Senate from the 8th district
- Incumbent
- Assumed office December 1, 2022
- Preceded by: Howard C. Anderson Jr.

Member of the North Dakota House of Representatives from the 28th district
- In office December 1, 2016 – December 1, 2022
- Succeeded by: Jim Grueneich

Personal details
- Party: Republican
- Spouse: Donna
- Children: 2
- Education: North Dakota State College of Science

Jeffery J. Magrum is an American businessman, plumber, and politician serving as a member of the North Dakota Senate from the 8th district. He previously served in the North Dakota House of Representatives from the 28th district.

== Early life and education ==
Magrum is a native of Kintyre, North Dakota. He attended Napoleon High School and North Dakota State College of Science for one year.

== Career ==
Magrum is the owner of the Magrum Excavating and Plumbing Company. He is a licensed master plumber and water well contractor. Magrum has also served as mayor of Hazelton, North Dakota. Emmons County Commissioner He was elected to the North Dakota House of Representatives in November 2016 and assumed office on December 1, 2016.
