= Kent Weston =

American politician

Member of the North Dakota Senate
- Incumbent
- Assumed office December 1, 2022
- Preceded by: Richard Marcellais
- Constituency: 9th District (2022–2025); 15th District (2025–Present)

Personal details
- Born: Sarles, North Dakota
- Party: Republican
- Spouse: Suzanne
- Children: 3
- Education: North Dakota State University (BA)
- Website: kentwestonforsenate.com

Kent Weston is an American farmer and politician who has served as a member of the North Dakota Senate since 2022, representing the 15th district since January 2025, having previously represented the 9th district from 2022 to 2025. He is a member of the Republican Party. Weston formerly served in the Rock Lake School Board and the Border Central School Board.

== Early life and education ==
Kent Weston was born in Sarles, North Dakota. He studied at the North Dakota State University, where he received a Bachelor of Arts in Agricultural Engineering.

== Personal life ==
Weston is married to Suzanne and has 3 children.
