= Kathy Hogan =

American politician

Minority Leader of the North Dakota Senate
- Incumbent
- Assumed office December 1, 2022
- Preceded by: Joan Heckaman

Member of the North Dakota Senate from the 21st district
- Incumbent
- Assumed office December 1, 2018
- Preceded by: Carolyn Nelson

Member of the North Dakota House of Representatives from the 21st district
- In office December 1, 2009 – December 1, 2018
- Preceded by: Jasper Schneider
- Succeeded by: LaurieBeth Hager

Personal details
- Born: February 1, 1948 (age 78) Brainerd, Minnesota, U.S.
- Party: Democratic
- Education: University of Jamestown (BS); North Dakota State University (MS)

Kathy Hogan (born February 1, 1948) is a Democratic-NPL politician in North Dakota. She is a member of the North Dakota Senate, representing the 21st District since 2018. She also represented the district in the North Dakota House of Representatives, serving from 2009 to 2018. She served as House Assistant Minority Leader from 2017 to 2018. In 2018, she announced she would give up her House seat to run to represent the same district in the North Dakota Senate, which she won in November.

North Dakota Senate
Preceded by Joan Heckaman	Minority Leader of the North Dakota Senate; 2022–present	Incumbent
