= Richard Marcellais =

American politician (born 1947)

Member of the North Dakota Senate from the 9th district
- Incumbent
- Assumed office January 3, 2025
- Preceded by: Kent Weston
- In office December 1, 2006 – December 1, 2022
- Preceded by: Dennis Bercier
- Succeeded by: Kent Weston

Personal details
- Born: January 23, 1947 (age 79)
- Party: Democratic-NPL
- Spouse: Betty
- Profession: business management

Richard Marcellais (born January 23, 1947) is a North Dakota Democratic-NPL Party member of the North Dakota Senate, representing the 9th district since 2025. He had previously represented the district from 2006 to 2022, and had been the tribal chairman of the Turtle Mountain Band of Chippewa Indians from 2008 to 2010.

== Political career ==
In November 2008, Marcellais was voted in as the tribal chairman of the Turtle Mountain Band of Chippewa Indians. He ran for re-election in the 2010 election, but his candidacy did not survive during the tribe's primary election; he placed third. In the wake of this defeat, he ran for re-election for his Senate seat, defeating Republican candidate Christopher Albertson.

In 2019, he introduced a bill in the Senate to require random yearly drug testing for school board members. He also supported a similar bill that would apply this to all school employees, saying that it would protect the children's safety. These bills were opposed by organizations of educational workers in the state, who argued that they violated the Fourth Amendment and placed a burden on schools which the state did not provide funding for. He also got a bill passed to waive the burial fees for military spouses and dependents being buried at the state's Veterans Cemetery.

Marcellais lost reelection in 2022, but returned to the Senate following the 2024 election, where he defeated redistricted incumbent Judy Estenson. He was among six senators in 2025 to call for a roll call vote over a verification vote on a resolution that would call for overturning the right to same-sex marriage in North Dakota, in an attempt to make each senator's vote on the resolution public. The attempt fell short of the eight required senators, while the resolution itself was defeated 31-16. In 2026, he lost the Democratic-NPL primary for his seat to State Representative Jayme Davis.

== Personal life ==
Marcellais and his wife Betty have two children.
