= 55th Legislative Assembly of North Dakota =

←	54th Legislative Assembly	56th Legislative Assembly	→

Overview
- Legislative body: North Dakota Legislative Assembly
- Jurisdiction: North Dakota, United States
- Meeting place: North Dakota State Capitol
- Term: 1997
- Website: www.ndlegis.gov

North Dakota State Senate
- Members: 47 Senators
- Majority Leader: Tony Grindberg (R)
- Minority Leader: Joel Heitkamp (D)
- Party control: North Dakota Republican Party

North Dakota House of Representatives
- Members: 94 Representatives
- Majority Leader: John Dorso (R)
- Minority Leader: Merle Boucher (D)
- Party control: North Dakota Republican Party

The 55th Legislative Assembly of North Dakota was the legislative session of the North Dakota Legislative Assembly that convened on January 6, 1997, and adjourned April 11, 1997.

== House ==
Affiliation	Members
Democratic	27
Republican	67
Total	94
Government Majority	30

== House Members ==
Composition of the House
Representative	District	Party
Ole Aarsvold	20	Democratic-NPL
Charles M. Axtman	48	Republican
Wesley R. Belter	22	Republican
Rick Berg	45	Republican
LeRoy G. Bernstein	45	Republican
James Boehm	31	Republican
Merle Boucher	9	Democratic-NPL
Mike Brandenburg	26	Republican
Grant C. Brown	36	Republican
Tom Brusegaard	19	Republican
Rex R. Byerly	1	Republican
Michael D. Callahan	21	Democratic-NPL
Ron Carlisle	30	Republican
Al Carlson	41	Republican
Linda Christenson	18	Democratic-NPL
Chris Christopherson	11	Republican
Tony Clark (Note: Resigned 10/24/1997)	44	Republican
James O. Coats	34	Democratic-NPL
Jack Dalrymple	22	Republican
Duane DeKrey	14	Republican
Lois Delmore	43	Democratic-NPL
Jeff Delzer	8	Republican
Bill Devlin	23	Republican
John Dorso	46	Republican
David Drovdal	39	Republican
April Fairfield	29	Democratic-NPL
Tom Freier (Note: Resigned 4/6/1998)	28	Republican
Glen Froseth	6	Republican
Pat Galvin	33	Republican
Gereld F. Gerntholz	24	Republican
Eliot Glassheim	18	Democratic-NPL
William E. Gorder	16	Republican
Bette Grande	41	Republican
Albert Grosz	8	Republican
Howard Grumbo	27	Democratic-NPL
Pam Gulleson	26	Democratic-NPL
G. Jane Gunter	7	Republican
Lyle Hanson	48	Democratic-NPL
LeRoy Hausauer	25	Republican
Kathy Hawken	46	Republican
Dale L. Henegar	30	Republican
Robert Huether	27	Democratic-NPL
Leonard J. Jacobs	35	Republican
Roxanne Jensen	17	Republican
Connie Johnsen	49	Republican
Dennis Johnson	12	Republican
George Keiser	47	Republican
Rae Ann Kelsch	34	Republican
Scot Kelsh	11	Democratic-NPL
Keith Kempenich	39	Republican
James Kerzman	35	Democratic-NPL
Ralph Kilzer	47	Republican
Matthew Klein	40	Republican
Kim Koppelman	13	Republican
William Kretschmar	28	Republican
Kenneth Kroeplin	23	Democratic-NPL
Richard W. Kunkel	15	Republican
Edward H. Lloyd	19	Republican
John Mahoney	33	Democratic-NPL
Andrew Maragos	3	Republican
Clarence F. Martin (Note: Died 2/9/1997)	36	Republican
Bob Martinson (Note: Resigned 10/14/1997)	49	Republican
Shirley Meyer	36	Democratic-NPL
Stacey L. Mickelson	38	Republican
David Monson	10	Republican
Paul C. Murphy	29	Republican
Jon Nelson	7	Republican
Eugene Nicholas	15	Republican
Ronald Nichols	4	Democratic-NPL
Carol A. Niemeier	20	Democratic-NPL
Darrell D. Nottestad	43	Republican
Bill Oban	32	Democratic-NPL
Alice A. Olson	10	Republican
Jim Poolman	42	Republican
Clara Sue Price	40	Republican
Dennis Renner	31	Republican
Earl Rennerfeldt	1	Republican
Wanda Rose	32	Democratic-NPL
Leland Sabby	24	Republican
Sally M. Sandvig	21	Democratic-NPL
Arlo Schmidt	12	Democratic-NPL
Robert J. Skarphol	2	Republican
Al Soukup	44	Republican
Allan Stenehjem	25	Republican
Ken Svedjan	17	Republican
Gerald Sveen	6	Republican
Lynn J. Thompson	16	Republican
Laurel Thoreson	13	Republican
Elwood Thorpe	5	Republican
Mike Timm	5	Democratic-NPL
Ben Tollefson	38	Republican
James Torgerson	2	Republican
Francis J. Wald	37	Republican
Rich Wardner	37	Republican
John Warner	4	Democratic-NPL
Amy Warnke	42	Republican
Robin Weisz	14	Republican
Janet Wentz	3	Republican
Gerry L. Wilkie	9	Democratic-NPL

== Senate ==
Affiliation	Members
Democratic	19
Republican	28
Total	47
Government Majority	9

== Senate Members ==
Composition of the Senate
Senator	District	Party
John M. Andrist	2	Republican
James A. Berg (Note: Died 9/20/1997)	44	Democratic-NPL
Bill Bowman	39	Republican
Randel Christmann	33	Republican
Dwight Cook	34	Republican
Judy L. DeMers	18	Democratic-NPL
Tom Fischer	46	Republican
Layton Freborg	8	Republican
William G. Goetz	37	Republican
Tony Grindberg	41	Republican
Joel Heitkamp	27	Democratic-NPL
Ray Holmberg	17	Republican
Jerry Kelsh	26	Democratic-NPL
Meyer Kinnoin	4	Democratic-NPL
Jerry Klein	14	Republican
Aaron Krauter	35	Democratic-NPL
Karen Krebsbach	40	Republican
Ed Kringstad	49	Republican
Les J. LaFountain	9	Democratic-NPL
Judy Lee	13	Republican
Elroy Lindaas	20	Democratic-NPL
Evan E. Lips	47	Republican
Tim Mathern	11	Democratic-NPL
Duane Mutch	19	Republican
Marv Mutzenberger	32	Democratic-NPL
Pete Naaden	28	Republican
Donna Nalewaja	45	Republican
Carolyn Nelson	21	Democratic-NPL
Gary J. Nelson	22	Republican
Dave Nething	48	Republican
David O'Connell	6	Democratic-NPL
Rolland W. Redlin	38	Democratic-NPL
Larry J. Robinson	24	Democratic-NPL
Harvey Sand	10	Republican
Randy Schobinger	3	Republican
Ken Solberg	7	Republican
Rod St. Aubyn	43	Republican
Bob Stenehjem	30	Republican
Wayne Stenehjem	42	Republican
Harvey D. Tallackson	16	Democratic-NPL
Russell T. Thane	25	Republican
Vern Thompson	12	Democratic-NPL
Steven W. Tomac	31	Democratic-NPL
John T. Traynor	15	Republican
Herbert Urlacher	36	Republican
Terry Wanzek	29	Republican
Darlene Watne	5	Republican
Daniel K. Wogsland	23	Democratic-NPL
James C. Yockim	1	Democratic-NPL
