= List of North Dakota insurance commissioners =

The North Dakota insurance commissioner regulates the insurance industry in North Dakota, United States. The following is a list of those that have held the position.

Insurance commissioners by party affiliation
Party	Insurance commissioners
Republican	18
Democratic	4
Democratic-NPL	3
Democratic-Independent	1

#	Name	Term	Party
1	A.L. Carey	1889–1892	Republican
2	James Cudhie	1893–1894	Democratic-Independent
3	Frederick B. Fancher	1895–1898	Republican
4	George W. Harrison	1899–1900	Republican
5	Ferdinand Leutz	1901–1904	Republican
6	Ernest C. Cooper	1905–1910	Republican
7	Walter C. Taylor	1911–1916	Republican
8	Sveinung A. Olsness	1917–1934	Republican/NPL
9	Harold Hopton	1935–1936	Republican/NPL
10	Oscar E. Erickson	1937–1945	Republican/NPL
11	Otto Krueger	1945–1950	Republican
12	Alfred J. Jensen	1951–1962	Republican
13	Frank Albers	1963–1964	Republican
14	Karsten O. Nygaard	1965–1968	Republican
15	Jorris O. Wigen	1969–1976	Republican
16	Byron Knutson	1977–1980	Democratic-NPL
17	Jorris O. Wigen	1981–1984	Republican
18	Earl Pomeroy	1985–1992	Democratic-NPL
19	Glenn Pomeroy	1993–2000	Democratic-NPL
20	Jim Poolman	2001–2007	Republican
21	Adam Hamm	2007– 2016	Republican
22	Jon Godfread	2016– present	Republican
