= Louise Potter (politician) =

American politician

Member of the North Dakota House of Representatives from the 17th district
- In office December 1, 2002 – December 1, 2010 Serving with Ken Svedjan
- Preceded by: Roxanne Jensen
- Succeeded by: Mark Owens; Mark Sanford

Personal details
- Born: February 19, 1950 (age 76) Boulder, Colorado
- Party: Democratic

Louise Potter (born February 19, 1950) is an American politician who served in the North Dakota House of Representatives from the 17th district from 2002 to 2010.
