= Oscar Erickson =

Oscar Erickson may refer to:

- Oscar E. Erickson (1884–1945), North Dakota politician
- Oscar Erickson (American football), American football coach
