= List of statues of Sacagawea =

List of all of Sacagawea's outdoor statues

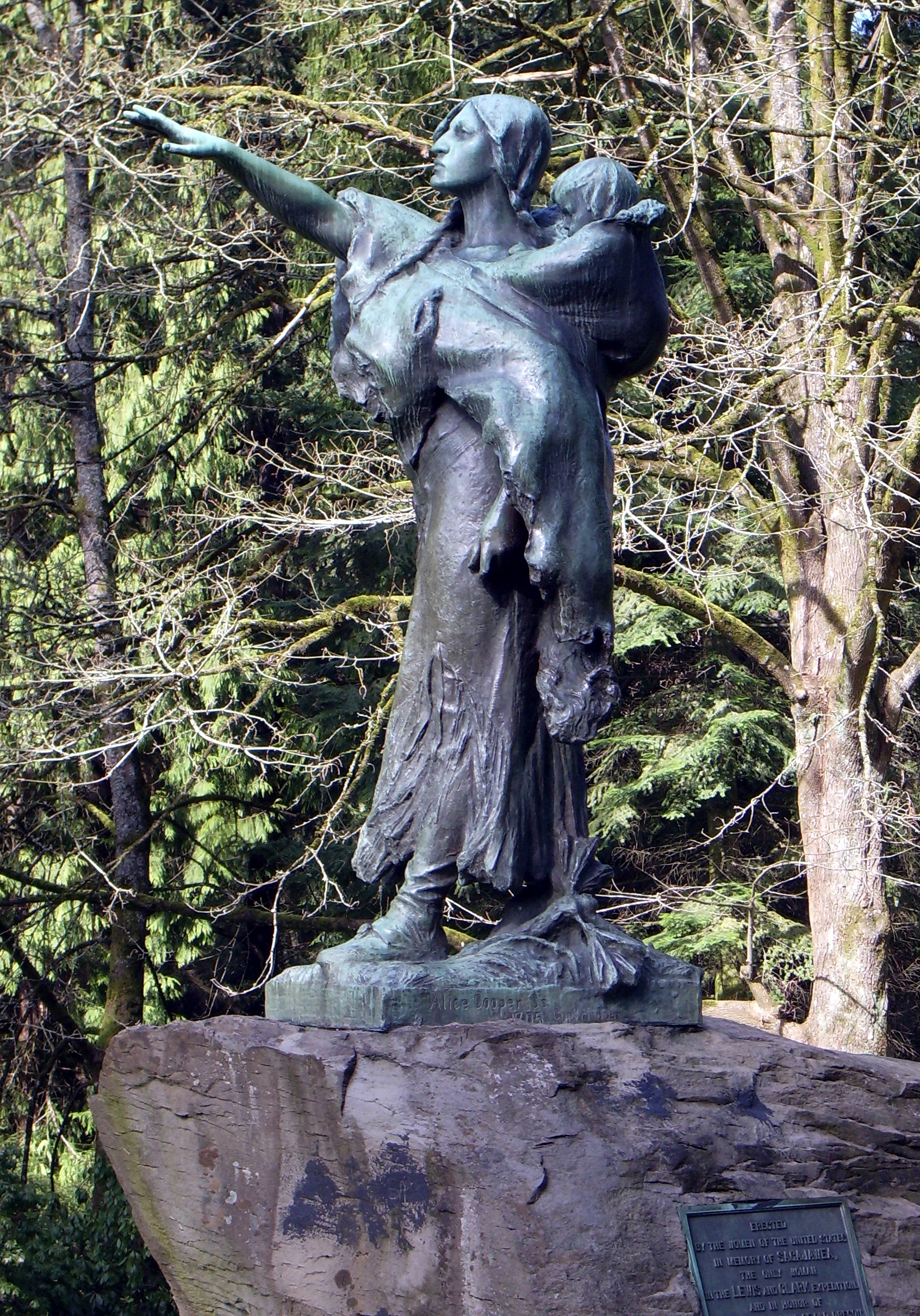
Sacajawea and Jean-Baptiste by Alice Cooper is located in Washington Park in Portland, Oregon.

Sixteen statues of Sacagawea have been identified. Wanda Pillow claims that "Sacajawea has more statues honoring her than any other U.S. woman, and her sentimentalized image is captured on postcards, stamps, coins, and other collectables."

- Sakakawea is a statue by Leonard Crunelle on the grounds of the North Dakota State Capitol at the entrance of the North Dakota Heritage Center in Bismarck. Another casting was given to the National Statuary Hall Collection.

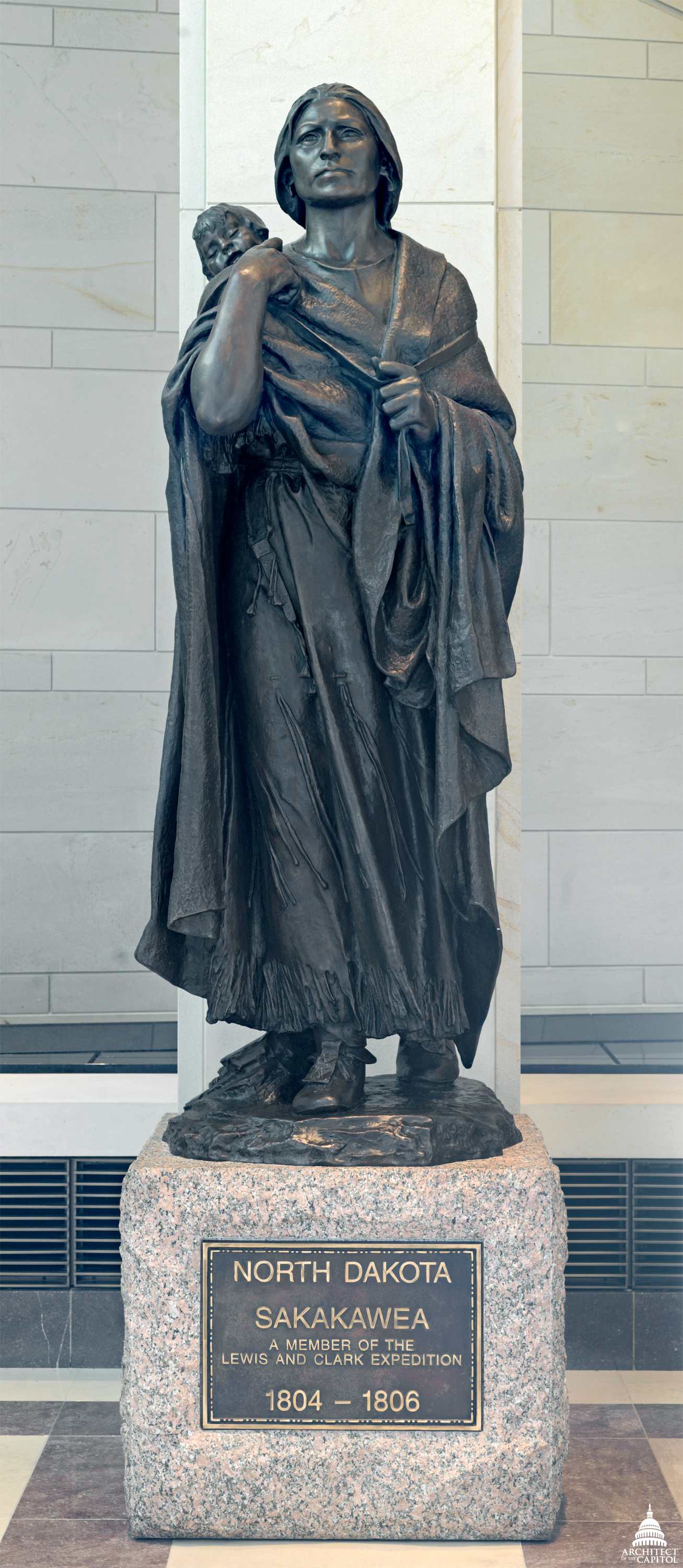
Sakakawea statue in the National Statuary Hall Collection

- Sakakawea by Crunelle is a replica of the one in the North Dakota Heritage Center. It is in the National Statuary Hall Collection representing North Dakota.
- Sacajawea and Jean-Baptiste, in Washington Park, Portland, Oregon, was sponsored by the National American Woman Suffrage Association in 1905. It was sculpted by Alice Cooper.
- Sacajawea statue at the Interpretive Center in Salmon, ID, sometimes labeled as being in the Lehmi River Valley.
- Sacagawea and Seamon the dog in Columbia River, Oregon. In 2010, the Port commissioned local artist Heather Söderberg of Söderberg Bronze Works Inc. to create two bronze sculptures of Sacagawea and the dog Seaman. Their statues are in the Cascade Locks Marine Park. Sacagawea is dramatically pointing the way with one hand and holding Baptiste's hand with the other.
- Corps of Discovery is a statue of Meriwether Lewis, William Clark, Sacagawea carrying her son Jean-Baptiste, and York. It is in Kansas City and was presented in 2000.
- Sacagwea by Jim Demetero. Sacagawea is shown carrying her son, Jean-Baptiste on her back; both are wrapped in a large blanket or shawl battling the cold of winter. This statue is in Astoria, Oregon.
- Sacagawea is carrying her son in a statue by Glenna Goodacre on Lewis and Clark Community College of Godfrey, Illinois. The college states, "Nestled in the restored central courtyard of the historic campus of Lewis and Clark Community College, stands the sculpture of the Native American woman, Sacagawea. [F]acing west with her son Jean Baptiste Charbonneau draped on her back, Sacagawea stands watch over the historic campus."
- Bird Woman by R. V. Greeves is at the Buffalo Bill Center.
- Sacagawea and Jean Baptiste by Glenna Goodacre is at Lewis & Clark College, Portland, Oregon.
- Coming Home by Mary Michael, showing Sacagawea feeding Jean-Baptiste, is at Sacajawea Park in Three Forks, Montana.
- Sacajawea by Harry Jackson (1980). This is an outdoor sculpture at Center of the West in Cashman Greever Garden. This sculpture is not painted as opposed to being bronze. It gives the blanket wrapping Sacagawea and her son a more realistic look with colors and folds.
- Arduous Journey was dedicated in 2010 at the Missouri River Federal Courthouse in Great Falls, Montana. This is a 9½ foot sculpture by Carol A. Grende (who made three Sacagawea statues before her death on March 9, 2009). It depicts Sacagawea carrying her son who was nicknamed "Little Pomp". It is at 125 Central Avenue West, Great Falls, MT 59404.
- Arduous Journey by Carol A. Grende in front of Sacagawea Hall at Lewis–Clark State College in Lewiston, Idaho.
- Arduous Journey by Carol A. Grende. This is a well-traveled piece. "During the Bicentennial years (2004–2006) of the Lewis and Clark Expedition, sculptor Carol Grende traveled with this particular casting of her work in tow the full length of the trail—from Monticello to the Pacific Ocean and back to Dayton." There is some disagreement over whether the statue is in Dayton, Ohio or (more likely) Dayton, Washington. This statue was dedicated "October 10, 2009, to the Historic Pathway, a sidewalk connecting the Dayton Historic Depot and the Smith Hollow Country Schoolhouse". Some believe that this statue is the one dedicated in 2010 to the Missouri River Federal Courthouse in Great Falls, Montana. Alternatively it could be a confusion due to the similarity of these two statues, both crafted by Grende.

A statue of Sacagawea, Lewis, and Clark was removed from Charlottesville, Virginia on July 10, 2021. Many deemed the statue as offensive, for Sacagawea is in a lowered/cowering/scared position.

Additionally, "Towering figures of Lewis, Clark, and Sacajawea, rendered abstractly in industrial metal, painted the colors of a traffic light" can be found in Bismarck, North Dakota.
