= Ruth Buffalo =

American politician

Member of the North Dakota House of Representatives from the 27th district
- In office December 1, 2018 – December 1, 2022 Serving with Thomas Beadle
- Preceded by: Randy Boehning
- Succeeded by: Josh Christy

Personal details
- Born: Watford City, North Dakota, U.S.
- Party: Democratic
- Children: 4
- Education: Si Tanka University (BS); North Dakota State University (MS, MBA, MPH)
- Website: ruth4nd.com

Ruth Anna Buffalo is an American politician who served as a member of the North Dakota House of Representatives from the 27th District, from December 1, 2018 to December 1, 2022. She is the first Native American Democratic woman elected to the North Dakota Legislature.

== Early life and education ==
Buffalo was born in Watford City, North Dakota and raised in Mandaree, North Dakota. She is an enrolled citizen of the Mandan, Hidatsa, and Arikara Nation. She earned a Bachelor of Science degree in criminal justice from Si Tanka University and three master's degrees from North Dakota State University: one in management, another in business administration, and one in public health.

== Career ==
Buffalo's involvement in politics began when she ran for North Dakota Insurance Commissioner in the 2016 North Dakota elections, but lost to Jon Godfread. In April 2017, she became party secretary of the North Dakota Democratic–Nonpartisan League and in July 2017, her mayor appointed her to the Fargo Native American Commission.

Buffalo replaced Randy Boehning, who was the primary sponsor of the Voter ID law that voting rights advocates warned would disenfranchise Native American voters. Other important issues in this 2018 race included access to health care, education (both K-12 and higher education), property taxes, and community safety. She endorsed the Kamala Harris 2024 presidential campaign.

== See also ==
- List of Democratic Socialists of America who have held office in the United States
- List of Native American politicians
- Native American women in politics

Party political offices
Preceded by Tom Potter	Democratic nominee for North Dakota Insurance Commissioner; 2016	Most recent
