= Luke Simons =

American politician (born 1978)

Member of the North Dakota House of Representatives from the 36th district
- In office December 1, 2016 – March 4, 2021 Serving with Mike Schatz
- Preceded by: Alan Fehr
- Succeeded by: Dori Hauck

Personal details
- Born: 1978 (age 47–48)
- Party: Republican
- Spouse: Aliesha (m. 1999; div. 2023)
- Children: 5

Luke Simons (born 1978) is an American rancher and politician from the state of North Dakota. A member of the Republican Party, Simons represented District 36 in the North Dakota House of Representatives. He was elected to the North Dakota House in 2016 and served until his expulsion in 2021.

== North Dakota House of Representatives ==
In 2012, Simons and his brother, Ben, both attempted to run for the legislature, however, neither won their races. Simons was later elected to the North Dakota House of Representatives in 2016 to represent the 36th district, which covered much of Dickinson, North Dakota.

While in the house, Simons was a member of the judiciary and political subdivisions committees. Simons was also affiliated with the Bastiat Caucus, a far-right caucus which supports lifting regulations on guns and reducing government spending.

During the COVID-19 pandemic, Simons received media attention for a Facebook post claiming that a rub from medicinal herb company Weed Botanical could treat and cure coronavirus.

Simons was the leading sponsor on a 2021 bill that would make numerous firearms and their related accessories exempt from federal regulations when within North Dakota's borders.

=== Sexual harassment claims and expulsion ===
In early 2021, Simons gained statewide attention after numerous female capital employees, legislative staffers, and other legislators began puvlically accusing him of sexual harassment, dating back to his first session in the legislature.

On March 4, 2021, Simons was expelled from the House of Representatives due to the allegations by a vote of 69–25, he is the first state lawmaker to be expelled in North Dakota.

== Post-expulsion ==
Immediately following his expulsion, Simons and his attorney suggested legal action against the legislature, claiming that he was removed without due process. While he declined to pursue legal action, Simons suggested he would consider running for public office again.

In the aftermath of the Uvalde school shooting, Simons received backlash for suggesting online that the shooting was a political stunt and an inside job. Later, in early 2024, Simons came out as a vocal defender of state representative Nico Rios, stating he should not resign amid calls to for a DUI arrest in which Rios verbally discriminated the officer, referring to the officer with homophobic slurs.

In June 2024, court documents were released from the year before that revealed Simons had physically and verbally abused his wife and children dating as far back as 1999. The documents stated that Simons had been separated from his wife and children since October 2021 after a severe incident where he assaulted his wife and bit his daughter.

== Personal life ==
Simons was married to his wife Aliesha, from 1999 until their divorce in 2023, prior to the divorce, they had been separated since 2021. They had 5 children together.

Simons has a brother, Ben, and their father is a preacher.
