= Froseth =

Froseth or Frøseth is a surname. Notable people with the surname include:

- Glen Froseth (born 1934), American politician
- Hege Frøseth (born 1969), Norwegian handball player
- Kristine Froseth (born 1996), American and Norwegian actress and model
