= Adam Hamm =

American politician (born 1971)

21st North Dakota Insurance Commissioner
- In office October 9, 2007 – January 2017
- Preceded by: Jim Poolman
- Succeeded by: Jon Godfread

Personal details
- Born: July 24, 1971 (age 55)
- Party: Republican

Adam Hamm (born July 24, 1971) is a former North Dakota Insurance Commissioner who served from 2007 to 2016. He was appointed to the position, and he began his work on October 22, 2007. Hamm is a former prosecutor in the Cass County State's Attorney's office and is a native of Jamestown. He won re-election in 2008 against challenger Jasper Schneider.

In late 2015, Hamm announced he would not seek a third term as Insurance Commissioner.

== Personal life ==
Hamm is married to Michelle, and they have two children.

== Electoral history ==
North Dakota Insurance Commissioner Election, 2008
Party	Candidate	Votes	%
Republican	Adam Hamm (inc.)	151,019	50.31
Democratic	Jasper Schneider	149,186	49.69

North Dakota Insurance Commissioner Election, 2012
Party	Candidate	Votes	%
Republican	Adam Hamm (inc.)	192,031	63.25
Democratic	Tom Potter	111,099	36.59
Write-ins	Write-ins	483	0.16

Party political offices
Preceded by Jim Poolman	Republican nominee for North Dakota Insurance Commissioner; 2008, 2012	Succeeded by Jon Godfread
Political offices
Preceded by Jim Poolman	Insurance Commissioner of North Dakota; 2007–2017	Succeeded by Jon Godfread
