= David Richter =

American politician

Member of the North Dakota House of Representatives from the 1st district
- Incumbent
- Assumed office December 1, 2018 Serving with Patrick Hatlestad
- Preceded by: Gary Sukut

Personal details
- Party: Republican
- Spouse: Debbie Richter
- Children: 3
- Education: Minot State University; Wayne State College
- Profession: Educator; Politician

David Richter is an American politician and educator who has served as a member of the North Dakota House of Representatives since December 2018. He currently represents the 1st district alongside Patrick Hatlestad. Richter is a Republican.

== Biography ==
Richter holds a BA degree from Minot State University and an MA degree from Wayne State College.

In February 2018, Richter announced that he would run for state representative. He came first in the June Republican primary, followed by incumbent Patrick Hatlestad. He and Hatlestad went on to win the November general election. Richter was sworn in as a representative on December 1, 2018 and succeeded Gary Sukut.

Richter is married to Debbie Richter and they have three children together. They reside in Williston.
