= Wilhoite =

- Pronunciation: WIL-HOYT

Origin
- Language: Middle High German
- Meaning: Toponymic Name
- Region of origin: Germany and United States

Other names
- Variant forms: Willeit, Wilhite, Wilhoit
- Frequency and Comparison

The surname Wilhoite is of German origin. This Americanized surname was derived from the German surname Willeit or Wilheit, which is a variant form of Willeitner. The Wilhoite name can trace its origin back to the northern part of the German state of Bavaria. Willeitner, is a habitational name from a more recent adaptation of the place named Weillitnen in northern Bavaria. Willeit is probably a toponymic name from Middle High German wil ‘small settlement’ + leite ‘slope’. The origins of toponymic by-names have been attributed to two non-mutually exclusive trends. One was to link the nobility to their places of origin and their feudal holdings and provide a marker of their status, while the other relates to the growth of the burgher class in the cities, partly via migration from the countryside.

== History ==
German Wilhoite families migrated from Germany and arrived in the America during the early 18th Century, primarily to Germanna, Virginia. Most Germans came to America seeking economic opportunities or religious and political freedom. Even so, Wilhoites most likely migrated due to religious prosecution; most German immigration to the United States during 1638-1820 was caused by religious persecutions following from the changes wrought by the Thirty Years' War, and also by economic hardship. Wilhoites also began to emigrate to England in the 18th century.

Most of the Germans who migrated to America with the Wilhoite (Wilheit) surname were part of the 2nd Germanna Colony - German families, whose members arrived in Virginia in 1717, from villages around the Kraichgau area of Baden-Württemberg, Germany. After arriving in Virginia, many of these families resettled and started their new lives in East Tennessee.

== People with the surname ==
- Kathleen Wilhoite, American actress and musician
- Michael Wilhoite, American football player
- Elmer Wilhoite, American football player and boxer
- Francis M. Wilhoit, American political scientist
- James Wilhoit, American football player
- Joe Wilhoit, American baseball player
