= Earl Rennerfeldt =

American politician

Member of the North Dakota House of Representatives from the 1st district
- In office December 1, 1990 – December 1, 2006
- Succeeded by: Patrick Hatlestad; Gary Sukut

Personal details
- Party: Republican

Earl Rennerfeldt is an American politician who served in the North Dakota House of Representatives from the 1st district from 1990 to 2006.
