= List of North Dakota Legislative Assemblies =

This is a list of North Dakota Legislative Assemblies, the legislature of North Dakota.

== Territorial Assemblies ==
These are the meetings of the Dakota Territory legislature

Territorial Assemblies
Number	Convened	Adjourned
1st Legislative Assembly of the Territory of Dakota	March 17, 1862	May 15, 1862
2nd Legislative Assembly of the Territory of Dakota	December 1, 1862	January 9, 1863
3rd Legislative Assembly of the Territory of Dakota	December 7, 1863	January 15, 1864
4th Legislative Assembly of the Territory of Dakota	December 5, 1864	January 13, 1865
5th Legislative Assembly of the Territory of Dakota	December 4, 1865	January 12, 1866
6th Legislative Assembly of the Territory of Dakota	December 3, 1866	January 11, 1867
7th Legislative Assembly of the Territory of Dakota	December 2, 1867	January 10, 1868
8th Legislative Assembly of the Territory of Dakota	December 7, 1868	January 15, 1869
9th Legislative Assembly of the Territory of Dakota	December 5, 1870	January 13, 1871
10th Legislative Assembly of the Territory of Dakota	December 2, 1872	January 10, 1873
11th Legislative Assembly of the Territory of Dakota	December 7, 1874	January 15, 1875
12th Legislative Assembly of the Territory of Dakota	January 9, 1877	February 17, 1877
13th Legislative Assembly of the Territory of Dakota	January 14, 1879	February 22, 1879
14th Legislative Assembly of the Territory of Dakota	January 11, 1881	March 7, 1881
15th Legislative Assembly of the Territory of Dakota	January 9, 1883	March 9, 1883
16th Legislative Assembly of the Territory of Dakota	January 13, 1885	March 13, 1885
17th Legislative Assembly of the Territory of Dakota	January 11, 1887	March 11, 1887
18th Legislative Assembly of the Territory of Dakota	January 8, 1889	March 8, 1889

== Post-Incorporation sessions ==
These are the current sessions of the legislature.

Name	Convened	Adjourned	Last election
1st Legislative Assembly of North Dakota	November 19, 1889	March 18, 1890	
2nd Legislative Assembly of North Dakota	January 6, 1891	March 6, 1891	
3rd Legislative Assembly of North Dakota	January 3, 1893	March 3, 1893	
4th Legislative Assembly of North Dakota	January 8, 1895	March 8, 1895	
5th Legislative Assembly of North Dakota	January 5, 1897	March 5, 1897	
6th Legislative Assembly of North Dakota	January 3, 1899	March 3, 1899	
7th Legislative Assembly of North Dakota	January 8, 1901	March 8, 1901	
8th Legislative Assembly of North Dakota	January 6, 1903	March 6, 1903	
9th Legislative Assembly of North Dakota	January 3, 1905	March 3, 1905	
10th Legislative Assembly of North Dakota	January 8, 1907	March 8, 1907	
11th Legislative Assembly of North Dakota	January 5, 1909	March 5, 1909	
12th Legislative Assembly of North Dakota	January 3, 1911	May 4, 1911	
13th Legislative Assembly of North Dakota	January 7, 1913	March 7, 1913	
14th Legislative Assembly of North Dakota	January 5, 1915	March 5, 1915	
15th Legislative Assembly of North Dakota	January 2, 1917	March 2, 1917	
16th Legislative Assembly of North Dakota	January 7, 1919	March 1, 1919	
17th Legislative Assembly of North Dakota	January 4, 1921	March 4, 1921	
18th Legislative Assembly of North Dakota	January 2, 1923	March 2, 1923	
19th Legislative Assembly of North Dakota	January 6, 1925	March 6, 1925	
20th Legislative Assembly of North Dakota	January 4, 1927	March 4, 1927	
21st Legislative Assembly of North Dakota	January 8, 1929	March 8, 1929	
22nd Legislative Assembly of North Dakota	January 6, 1931	March 6, 1931	
23rd Legislative Assembly of North Dakota	January 3, 1933	March 3, 1933	
24th Legislative Assembly of North Dakota	January 8, 1935	March 8, 1935	
25th Legislative Assembly of North Dakota	January 5, 1937	March 5, 1937	
26th Legislative Assembly of North Dakota	January 3, 1939	March 3, 1939	
27th Legislative Assembly of North Dakota	January 7, 1941	March 7, 1941	
28th Legislative Assembly of North Dakota	January 5, 1943	March 5, 1943	
29th Legislative Assembly of North Dakota	January 2, 1945	March 2, 1945	
30th Legislative Assembly of North Dakota	January 7, 1947	March 7, 1947	
31st Legislative Assembly of North Dakota	January 4, 1949	March 4, 1949	
32nd Legislative Assembly of North Dakota	January 2, 1951	March 2, 1951	
33rd Legislative Assembly of North Dakota	January 6, 1953	March 6, 1953	
34th Legislative Assembly of North Dakota	January 4, 1955	March 4, 1955	
35th Legislative Assembly of North Dakota	January 8, 1957	March 8, 1957	
36th Legislative Assembly of North Dakota	January 6, 1959	March 6, 1959	
37th Legislative Assembly of North Dakota	January 3, 1961	March 3, 1961	
38th Legislative Assembly of North Dakota	January 8, 1963	March 8, 1963	
39th Legislative Assembly of North Dakota	January 5, 1965	March 5, 1965	
40th Legislative Assembly of North Dakota	January 3, 1967	March 3, 1967	
41st Legislative Assembly of North Dakota	January 7, 1969	March 18, 1969	
42nd Legislative Assembly of North Dakota	January 5, 1971	March 16, 1971	
43rd Legislative Assembly of North Dakota	January 2, 1973	March 16, 1973	
44th Legislative Assembly of North Dakota	January 7, 1975	March 26, 1975	
45th Legislative Assembly of North Dakota	January 4, 1977	April 7, 1977	
46th Legislative Assembly of North Dakota	January 3, 1979	March 29, 1979	
47th Legislative Assembly of North Dakota	January 6, 1981	March 31, 1981	
48th Legislative Assembly of North Dakota	January 4, 1983	April 20, 1983	
49th Legislative Assembly of North Dakota	January 8, 1985	April 5, 1985	
50th Legislative Assembly of North Dakota	January 6, 1987	April 19, 1987	
51st Legislative Assembly of North Dakota	January 4, 1989	April 20, 1989	
52nd Legislative Assembly of North Dakota	January 7, 1991	April 11, 1991	
53rd Legislative Assembly of North Dakota	January 5, 1993	April 24, 1993	
54th Legislative Assembly of North Dakota	January 3, 1995	April 7, 1995	
55th Legislative Assembly of North Dakota	January 6, 1997	April 11, 1997	
56th Legislative Assembly of North Dakota	January 5, 1999	April 17, 1999	
57th Legislative Assembly of North Dakota	January 9, 2001	April 28, 2001	
58th Legislative Assembly of North Dakota	January 7, 2003	April 25, 2003	
59th Legislative Assembly of North Dakota	January 4, 2005	April 23, 2005	
60th Legislative Assembly of North Dakota	January 3, 2007	April 25, 2007	
61st Legislative Assembly of North Dakota	January 6, 2009	May 4, 2009	
62nd Legislative Assembly of North Dakota	January 4, 2011	April 28, 2011	November 2010
63rd Legislative Assembly of North Dakota	January 8, 2013	May 4, 2013	November 2012
64th Legislative Assembly of North Dakota	January 6, 2015	April 29, 2015 (Note: Reconvened and adjourned June 16, 2015)	November 2014
65th Legislative Assembly of North Dakota	January 3, 2017	April 27, 2017	November 2016
66th Legislative Assembly of North Dakota	January 3, 2019	April 26, 2019	November 2018
67th Legislative Assembly of North Dakota	January 5, 2021	April 29, 2021	November 2020: House, Senate
68th Legislative Assembly of North Dakota	January 3, 2023	April 30, 2023	November 2022: House, Senate
69th Legislative Assembly of North Dakota	January 7, 2025	May 3, 2025	November 5, 2024: House, Senate

== See also ==
- List of speakers of the North Dakota House of Representatives
- List of majority leaders of the North Dakota House of Representatives
- List of presidents pro tempore of the North Dakota Senate
- List of majority leaders of the North Dakota Senate
- List of governors of North Dakota
- Constitution of North Dakota
- North Dakota State Capitol
- Historical outline of North Dakota
- Lists of United States state legislative sessions
