= Statue of Sacagawea =

Statue of Sacagawea may refer to:

- Sakakawea (Crunelle)
- Sacajawea and Jean-Baptiste, Washington Park, Portland, Oregon, U.S.
