= Walter C. Taylor =

American politician

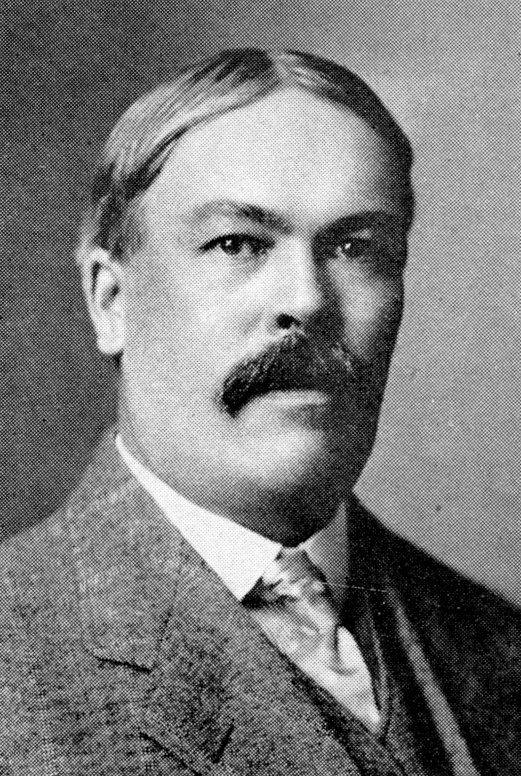

North Dakota Insurance Commissioner
- In office 1911–1916
- Preceded by: Ernest C. Cooper
- Succeeded by: Sveinung A. Olsness

Personal details
- Born: February 18, 1870; Alexander, Minnesota, US
- Died: August 24, 1929 (aged 59); Hennepin County, Minnesota, US
- Political party: Republican
- Spouse: Mabel Diesem

Walter C. Taylor (February 18, 1870 – August 24, 1929), a.k.a. W.C. Taylor, was a North Dakota politician who served as the North Dakota Insurance Commissioner from 1911 to 1916.

== Biography ==
Walter C. Taylor was born in Alexander, Minnesota on February 18, 1870. He moved to Devils Lake, Dakota Territory, with his parents in 1886. He entered the newspaper business in 1890, purchasing Towner News, a small newspaper from Towner, North Dakota. He relocated to LaMoure, North Dakota, and edited their newspaper, The Chronicle in 1894. He was elected as the North Dakota Insurance Commissioner in 1910, and he served until 1916.

Taylor died on August 24, 1929, in Hennepin County, Minnesota, at the age of 59.

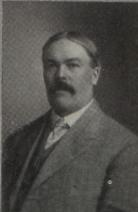
W.C. Taylor

== Bibliography ==
- North Dakota Secretary of State. "North Dakota Blue Book" (1911), pp. 528.
- North Dakota Secretary of State. "North Dakota Blue Book" (2005), pp. 332.

== See also ==
- List of North Dakota insurance commissioners

Preceded by E.C. Cooper	Insurance Commissioner of North Dakota; 1905–1914	Succeeded by S.A. Olsness
