= 2016 North Dakota elections =

- November 8, 2016

North Dakota held two statewide elections in 2016: a primary election on Tuesday, June 14, and a general election on Tuesday, November 8. In addition, each township elected officers on Tuesday, March 15, and each school district selected a date between April 1 and June 30 to hold their elections. This would have been the first election since the state legislature revoked the ability to use a student or military ID to satisfy state ID voting requirements, but a court ruling in August struck the down the provision, and the election was held under the 2013 rules.

== Primary election ==
On Tuesday, June 14, North Dakota voters decided which candidates for statewide and legislative office would appear on their ballot. In addition, voters were faced with the decision whether to ratify a single initiative, which was passed by the legislature, but referred to statewide vote via petition.

=== Measure 1 ===
Referred Measure 1 Results by county No: 80–90%; 70–80%

In 2015, the North Dakota Legislative Assembly passed SB 2351, which would allow corporations and limited liability companies to own dairy and swine production facilities up to 640 acres (260 ha) in size. On March 27, 2015, a committee of members led by officers of North Dakota Farmers Union filed an unsigned petition with the North Dakota secretary of state, allowing the group to gather signatures with the intent to place the item on the June ballot. On June 16, 2015, the committee returned with 19,354 valid signatures, well above the 13,452 required.

On the June 14 primary ballot, voters were asked to approve or deny the bill, given the following explanation:

Senate Bill No. 2351, passed by the 2015 Legislative Assembly, would allow the ownership or leasing of up to 640 acres of land for the operation of a dairy farm or swine production facility by a domestic corporation or limited liability company. Senate Bill 2351 would also require the agriculture commissioner to develop reporting and monitoring rules to ensure compliance.

== General election ==
On Tuesday, November 8, North Dakota voters selected the state's three presidential electors, one United States senator, one United States representative, governor, lieutenant governor, and several other statewide executive and judicial branch offices. Voters who lived in even-numbered legislative districts also selected their representatives to the North Dakota House of Representatives and North Dakota Senate. Voters also approved only one of the five ballot petitions that have received enough signatures to be placed on the ballot.

=== United States president and vice president ===
North Dakota voters chose three electors to represent them in the Electoral College via a popular vote. Voters selected the electors representing the Republican candidates, businessman Donald Trump and Indiana Governor Mike Pence, over their Democratic rivals, former Secretary of State Hillary Clinton and Senator Tim Kaine.

2016 United States presidential election in North Dakota
Party	Candidate	Votes	%
Republican	Donald Trump and Mike Pence	216,794	62.96
Democratic–NPL	Hillary Clinton and Tim Kaine	93,758	27.23
Libertarian	Gary Johnson and William Weld	21,434	6.22
n/a	Write-ins	6,397	1.86
Green	Jill Stein and Ajamu Baraka	3,780	1.10
Constitution	Darrell Castle and Scott Bradley	1,833	0.53
American Delta	Rocky De La Fuente and Michael Steinberg	364	0.11
Total votes		344,360	100.00
Republican win			

=== United States senator ===
Voters selected whom to send to Class III of the United States Senate. The incumbent, Republican John Hoeven, defeated Democratic-NPL state representative Eliot Glassheim by a wide margin.

2016 United States Senate election in North Dakota
Party	Candidate	Votes	%
Republican	John Hoeven	268,788	78.48
Democratic–NPL	Eliot Glassheim	58,116	16.97
Libertarian	Robert Marquette	10,556	3.08
Independent	James Germalic	4,675	1.36
n/a	Write-ins	366	0.11
Total votes		342,501	100.00
Republican hold			

=== United States House of Representatives ===
Voters selected a representative to the United States House of Representatives. Incumbent Republican Representative Kevin Cramer defeated Democratic-NPL American Indian activist Chase Iron Eyes.

2016 North Dakota's at-large congressional district
Party	Candidate	Votes	%
Republican	Kevin Cramer	233,980	69.13
Democratic–NPL	Chase Iron Eyes	80,377	23.75
Libertarian	Jack Seaman	23,528	6.95
n/a	Write-ins	574	0.17
Total votes		338,459	100.00
Republican hold			

=== Governor and lieutenant governor ===
The Republican team of businessman Doug Burgum and Watford City Mayor Brent Sanford defeated the Democratic-NPL candidates, state representative Marvin Nelson and state senator Joan Heckaman in the race to replace retiring incumbent Governor Jack Dalrymple and Lieutenant Governor Drew Wrigley.

2016 North Dakota gubernatorial election
Party	Candidate	Votes	%
Republican	Doug Burgum and Brent Sanford	259,863	76.52
Democratic–NPL	Marvin Nelson and Joan Heckaman	65,855	19.39
Libertarian	Marty Riske and Joshua Voytek	13,230	3.90
n/a	Other	653	0.19
Total votes		339,601	100.00
Republican hold			

=== State auditor ===
Results by county Gallion: 60-70% 70-80% 80-90% Riemers: 50-60% 60-70%

In the election for state auditor, voters selected Republican accountant Josh Gallion to replace retiring incumbent Bob Peterson over frequent Libertarian Party candidate Roland Riemers.

2016 North Dakota state auditor election
Party	Candidate	Votes	%
Republican	Josh Gallion	236,751	76.62
Libertarian	Roland Riemers	70,818	22.92
n/a	Write-ins	1,423	0.46
Total votes		308,992	100.00
Republican hold			

=== State treasurer ===
Results by county Schmidt: 40–50%; 50–60%; 60–70%; 70–80%; 80–90%; Mathern: 60–70%

In the state treasurer election, Republican incumbent Kelly Schmidt defeated the Democratic-NPL challenger, state Senator Tim Mathern.

2016 North Dakota state treasurer election
Party	Candidate	Votes	%
Republican	Kelly Schmidt (incumbent)	204,733	62.95
Democratic–NPL	Tim Mathern	95,191	29.27
Libertarian	Eric Olson	24,829	7.63
n/a	Write-ins	491	0.15
Total votes		325,244	100.00
Republican hold			

=== Insurance commissioner ===
Results by county Godfread: 50–60%; 60–70%; 70–80%; 80–90%; Buffalo: 40–50%; 60–70%; 70–80%

In the race for insurance commissioner, voters selected the Republican candidate, Greater North Dakota Chamber executive Jon Godfread, over the Democratic-NPL candidate, educator Ruth Buffalo, to replace incumbent Commissioner Adam Hamm, who declined to run for a third term.

2016 North Dakota insurance commissioner election
Party	Candidate	Votes	%
Republican	Jon Godfread	206,067	64.41
Democratic–NPL	Ruth Buffalo	85,696	26.79
Libertarian	Nick Bata	27,642	8.64
n/a	Write-ins	534	0.17
Total votes		319,939	100.00
Republican hold			

=== Public service commissioner ===
Results by county Fedorchak: 50–60%; 60–70%; 70–80%; 80–90%; Hunte-Beaubrun: 50–60%; 70–80%

Voters were given the opportunity to fill one of the three seats on the Public Service Commission, selecting Republican incumbent Julie Fedorchak over Democratic-NPL rival Marlo Hunte-Beaubrun.

2016 North Dakota public service commissioner election
Party	Candidate	Votes	%
Republican	Julie Fedorchak (incumbent)	218,961	68.76
Democratic–NPL	Marlo Hunte-Beaubrun	72,028	22.62
Libertarian	Thomas Skadeland	26,913	8.45
n/a	Write-ins	563	0.18
Total votes		318,465	100.00
Republican hold			

=== Superintendent of public instruction ===
Results by county Baesler: 60–70%; 70–80%; 80–90%

In the nonpartisan election for superintendent of public instruction, voters selected incumbent Kirsten Baesler, who had been endorsed by the Republican Party, over educator Joe Chiang, who had not been endorsed by any statewide party.

2016 North Dakota superintendent of public instruction election
Candidate	Votes	%
Kirsten Baesler	220,079	74.60
Joe Chiang	73,350	24.86
Write-in	1,598	0.54
Total votes	295,027	100.00

=== Supreme Court justice ===
Two seats on the North Dakota Supreme Court were up for election in 2016: a regularly scheduled election to a full ten-year term, in which Jerod Tufte and Robert Bolinske competed to replace retiring Justice Dale Sandstrom, and a special election to serve the final two years of the term of retired Justice Mary Muehlen Maring, in which Lisa K. Fair McEvers ran unopposed.

Results by county Tufte: 50–60%; 60–70%; 70–80%; 80–90%; Bolinske: 40–50%; 50–60%

2016 justice of the North Dakota Supreme Court election
Candidate	Votes	%
Jerod Elton Tufte	166,229	60.69
Robert V. Bolinske, Sr	105,825	38.64
Write-in	1,851	0.68
Total votes	273,905	100.00

Results by county McEvers: 90-100%

2016 Justice of the North Dakota Supreme Court special election
Candidate	Votes	%
Lisa Fair McEvers	261,255	98.98
Write-in	2,700	1.02
Total votes	263,955	100.00
