= Alfred Jensen (disambiguation) =

Alfred Jensen (1903–1981) was a Guatemalan abstract painter.

Alfred Jensen may also refer to:

- Alfred Jensen (politician) (1903–1988), Danish politician and government minister
- Alfred Jensen (slavist) (1859–1921), Swedish historian, slavist, writer, poet
- Alfred J. Jensen (1893–1973), Insurance Commissioner for the State of North Dakota
- Alfred Jensen (Danish painter) (1859–1935), Danish painter of marine art, see SS Cap Polonio
