= Otto Krueger (politician) =

American politician (1890–1963)

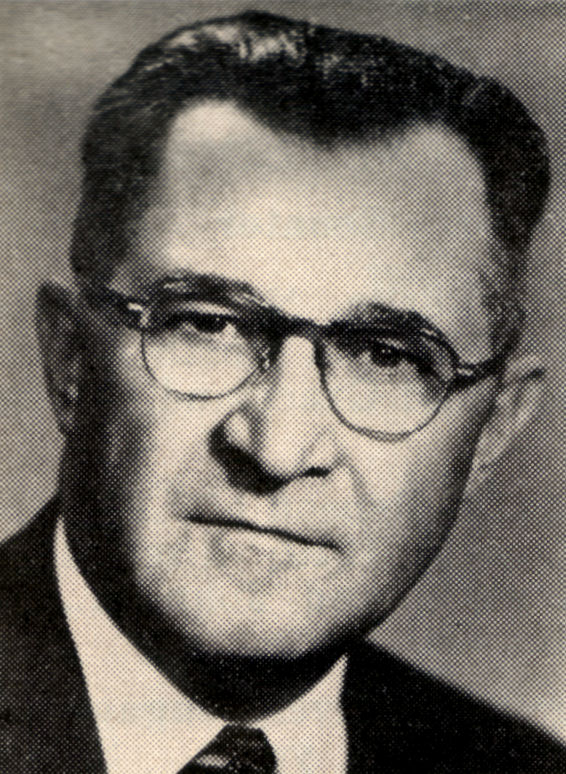

Member of the U.S. House of Representatives from North Dakota's at-large district
- In office January 3, 1953 – January 3, 1959
- Preceded by: Fred G. Aandahl
- Succeeded by: Don L. Short

11th North Dakota Insurance Commissioner
- In office 1945–1950
- Governor: Fred G. Aandahl
- Preceded by: Oscar E. Erickson
- Succeeded by: Alfred J. Jensen

18th North Dakota State Treasurer
- In office 1944–1945
- Governor: Fred G. Aandahl
- Preceded by: Carl Anderson
- Succeeded by: Hjalmer W. Swenson

Personal details
- Born: September 7, 1890 Volhynia, Russia
- Died: June 6, 1963 (aged 72) Lodi, California, U.S
- Party: Republican

Military service
- Allegiance: United States of America
- Branch/service: United States Army
- Years of service: 1918–1919
- Rank: Private
- Unit: Infantry
- Battles/wars: World War I

Otto Gottlieb Krueger (September 7, 1890 – June 6, 1963) was a North Dakota politician who served as the state treasurer and the insurance commissioner at different periods during the 1940s. He later served as a U.S. representative from his state in the 1950s.

== Biography ==
Krueger was born of German parents in the Volinia district of southwest Russia in 1890. He attended grade and high school in Russian and German schools, and immigrated to the United States in June 1910 and settled in Fessenden, North Dakota. He furthered his education through grade and high schools and two years of business school in Fargo, North Dakota and Great Falls, Montana. During the First World War he served as a private in the Infantry from April 1918 to May 1919, with overseas service in the 91st division. He served as the county auditor for Wells County, North Dakota from 1920 to 1940 and a clerk of the Fessenden School District from 1922 to 1940. He was elected as the North Dakota State Treasurer in 1944, but resigned from the position on September 7, 1945. His resignation was in order to fill the office of North Dakota Insurance Commissioner which was vacated by the late Oscar E. Erickson. He served in that capacity until 1950 when he did not seek re-election. After leaving the office, he served as the treasurer of the Republican Party until 1952.

Krueger was elected as a Republican to the Eighty-third, Eighty-fourth, and Eighty-fifth Congresses (January 3, 1953 - January 3, 1959). Krueger voted in favor of the Civil Rights Act of 1957. He was not a candidate for renomination in 1958. Krueger relocated to Lodi, California, in 1959, where he pursued a career in accounting and farming. He died on June 6, 1963, in Lodi and was laid to rest at Cherokee Memorial Park Cemetery.

== Sources ==
- United States Congress. "Otto Krueger (id: K000332)". Biographical Directory of the United States Congress.

Party political offices
Preceded by Carl Anderson	Republican nominee for North Dakota State Treasurer; 1944	Succeeded by Hjalmer W. Swenson
Preceded by Oscar E. Erickson	Republican nominee for North Dakota Insurance Commissioner; 1946, 1948	Succeeded by Alfred J. Jensen
Political offices
Preceded by Carl Anderson	North Dakota State Treasurer; 1945	Succeeded by Hjalmer W. Swenson
Preceded by Oscar E. Erickson	Insurance Commissioner of North Dakota; 1945–1950	Succeeded by Alfred J. Jensen
U.S. House of Representatives
Preceded by Fred G. Aandahl	Member of the U.S. House of Representatives from North Dakota's at-large congressional district 1953–1959	Succeeded by Don L. Short
