= George W. Harrison =

American politician (1867–1931)

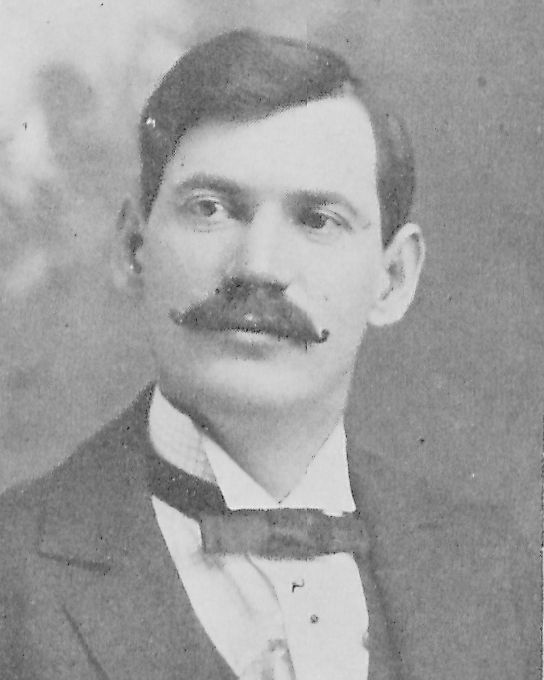
- Harrison in 1899

North Dakota Insurance Commissioner
- In office 1899–1900
- Preceded by: Frederick B. Fancher
- Succeeded by: Ferdinand Leutz

Personal details
- Born: George W. Harrison; September 15, 1867
- Died: October 16, 1931 (aged 64)
- Party: Republican
- Spouse: Myrtie E. Allen

George W. Harrison (September 15, 1867– October 16, 1931) was a prominent journalist, newspaper editor and publisher, and North Dakota Republican Party politician who served as the fourth insurance commissioner of North Dakota from 1899 to 1900.

Harrison was born on September 15, 1867, in Defiance County, Ohio. He attended school in Hicksville, Ohio. With his older brother, W. C. B. Harrison, he later worked at the Hicksville Independent newspaper, where he learned the craft of printing and engraving.

Harrison married Myrtie E. Allen on March 3, 1889.

He went on to work for newspapers in Indiana and Minnesota, including the Minneapolis Tribune. He also founded the Daily Register in Austin, Minnesota. Harrison later moved to North Dakota and became the Bismarck correspondent for the Fargo Argus. After the legislative session ended, he purchased the Lisbon Star in Lisbon, North Dakota, and renamed it to the Free Press.

After living in North Dakota, the Harrison family moved to Ohio and then Minnesota. George W. Harrison died on October 16, 1931, in Minnesota.

== See also ==
- List of North Dakota insurance commissioners
