= Dale Severson =

American politician

Member of the North Dakota House of Representatives from the 23rd district
- In office December 1, 1998 – November 4, 2003
- Preceded by: Kenneth Kroeplin
- Succeeded by: Don Vigesaa

Personal details
- Born: August 15, 1948 Moorhead, Minnesota
- Died: November 4, 2003 (aged 55) Cooperstown, North Dakota
- Party: Republican

Dale Severson (August 15, 1948 – November 4, 2003) was an American politician who served in the North Dakota House of Representatives from the 23rd district from 1998 until his death in 2003.

He died on November 4, 2003, in Cooperstown, North Dakota at age 55.
