= North Dakota State Fire Marshal =

The Office of the North Dakota State Fire Marshal is a fire marshal agency in the U.S. state of North Dakota. It is a division of the North Dakota Insurance Department.

The current State Fire Marshal is Doug Nelson, appointed in 2018.

== Duties and responsibilities ==
The State Fire Marshal and deputy fire marshals enforce the laws of the State of North Dakota relating to the prevention of fires, combustibles, explosives, fireworks, and hazardous materials, the suppression of arson, and fire and safety code compliance.

The agency is also responsible for investigating the origin and cause of fires and publishing statistics regarding fire-related incidents. It conducts an approximate average of one hundred forensic investigations per year.

== Notable investigations ==
In 2024, the agency investigated the origin and cause of wildfires that burned more than 100,000 acres in North Dakota, and caused two fatalities. It determined the fires had been caused by oil well flaring and were accidental.
