= Daniel Wogsland =

American politician

Member of the North Dakota Senate from the 23rd district
- In office December 1, 1982 – December 1, 1998
- Succeeded by: Kenneth Kroeplin

Personal details
- Party: Democratic

Daniel Wogsland is an American politician who served in the North Dakota Senate from the 23rd district from 1982 to 1998.
