= Laurie Garbel =

American politician

Member-elect of the North Dakota House of Representatives from the 1st district
- Assuming office December 2026
- Succeeding: Patrick Hatlestad

Personal details
- Party: Republican

Laurie Garbel is an American politician. A member of the Republican Party, she is the member-elect for the 1st district of the North Dakota House of Representatives.
