= Duane DeKrey =

American politician

Member of the North Dakota House of Representatives from the 14th district
- In office December 1, 1994 – December 1, 2012
- Succeeded by: Jon Nelson

Member of the North Dakota Senate from the 14th district
- In office December 1, 1990 – December 1, 1992

Personal details
- Born: June 20, 1956 (age 70) Jamestown, North Dakota
- Party: Republican

Duane DeKrey (born June 20, 1956) is an American politician who served in the North Dakota Senate from the 14th district from 1990 to 1992 and in the North Dakota House of Representatives from the 14th district from 1994 to 2012.
