= Curtis Brekke =

American politician

Member of the North Dakota House of Representatives from the 15th district
- In office December 1, 1998 – December 1, 2002
- Preceded by: Richard W. Kunkel
- Succeeded by: Dennis Johnson

Personal details
- Born: January 21, 1926 Fergus Falls, Minnesota
- Died: August 31, 2006 (aged 80) Prior Lake, Minnesota
- Party: Republican

Curtis Brekke (January 21, 1926 – August 31, 2006) was an American politician who served in the North Dakota House of Representatives from the 15th district from 1998 to 2002.

He died on August 31, 2006, in Prior Lake, Minnesota at age 80.
