= Fairdale, North Dakota =

Fairdale
- City
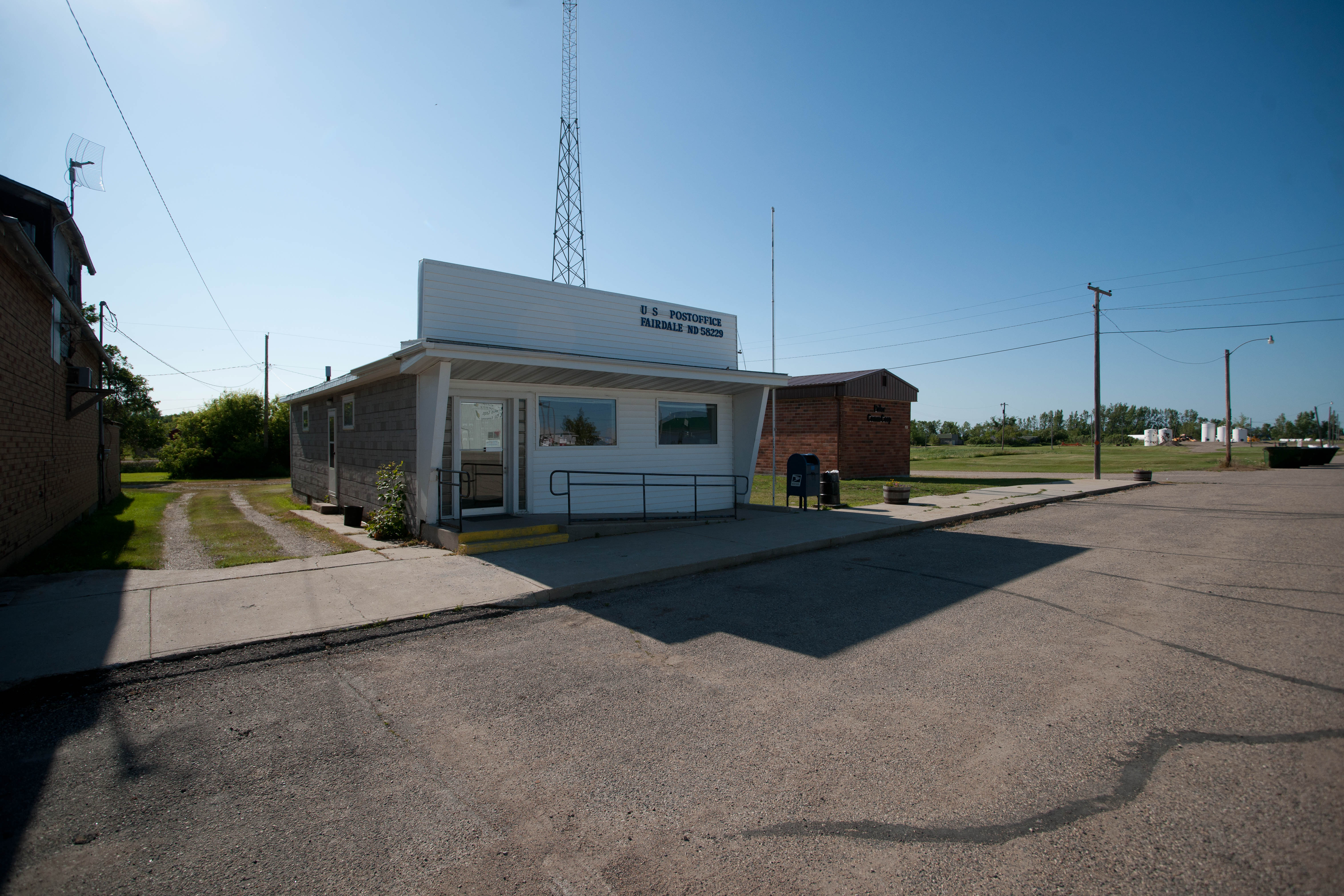
- Post office in Fairdale

- Location of Fairdale, North Dakota
- Coordinates: 48°29′24″N 98°13′52″W
- Country: United States
- State: North Dakota
- County: Walsh
- Founded: 1905

Area
  - Total: 0.32 sq mi (0.82 km^{2})
  - Land: 0.32 sq mi (0.82 km^{2})
  - Water: 0 sq mi (0.00 km^{2})
- Elevation: 1,617 ft (493 m)

Population (2020)
  - Total: 30
  - Estimate (2022): 28
  - Density: 95/sq mi (36.6/km^{2})
- Time zone: UTC–6 (Central (CST))
  - Summer (DST): UTC–5 (CDT)
- ZIP Code: 58229
- Area code: 701
- FIPS code: 38-25180
- GNIS feature ID: 1036028

Fairdale is a city in Walsh County, North Dakota, United States. The population was 30 at the 2020 census. Fairdale was founded in 1905.

== Geography ==
According to the United States Census Bureau, the city has a total area of 0.31 square miles (0.80 km^{2}), all land.

== Demographics ==
Historical population
Census	Pop.	Note	%±
1910	140		—
1920	192		37.1%
1930	171		−10.9%
1940	187		9.4%
1950	131		−29.9%
1960	126		−3.8%
1970	102		−19.0%
1980	97		−4.9%
1990	76		−21.6%
2000	51		−32.9%
2010	38		−25.5%
2020	30		−21.1%
2022 (est.)	28		−6.7%
U.S. Decennial Census; 2020 Census

=== 2010 census ===
As of the census of 2010, there were 38 people, 19 households, and 11 families living in the city. The population density was 122.6 inhabitants per square mile (47.3/km^{2}). There were 33 housing units at an average density of 106.5 per square mile (41.1/km^{2}). The racial makeup of the city was 92.1% White, 2.6% Asian, and 5.3% from other races. Hispanic or Latino of any race were 5.3% of the population.

There were 19 households, of which 5.3% had children under the age of 18 living with them, 52.6% were married couples living together, 5.3% had a female householder with no husband present, and 42.1% were non-families. 36.8% of all households were made up of individuals, and 10.5% had someone living alone who was 65 years of age or older. The average household size was 2.00 and the average family size was 2.55.

The median age in the city was 56.5 years. 10.5% of residents were under the age of 18; 10.5% were between the ages of 18 and 24; 5.2% were from 25 to 44; 36.9% were from 45 to 64; and 36.8% were 65 years of age or older. The gender makeup of the city was 63.2% male and 36.8% female.

=== 2000 census ===
As of the census of 2000, there were 51 people, 26 households, and 15 families living in the city. The population density was 164.0 inhabitants per square mile (63.3/km^{2}). There were 38 housing units at an average density of 122.2 per square mile (47.2/km^{2}). The racial makeup of the city was 98.04% White and 1.96% Native American.

There were 26 households, out of which 19.2% had children under the age of 18 living with them, 50.0% were married couples living together, and 42.3% were non-families. 42.3% of all households were made up of individuals, and 23.1% had someone living alone who was 65 years of age or older. The average household size was 1.96 and the average family size was 2.67.

In the city, the population was spread out, with 17.6% under the age of 18, 2.0% from 18 to 24, 25.5% from 25 to 44, 15.7% from 45 to 64, and 39.2% who were 65 years of age or older. The median age was 58 years. For every 100 females, there were 131.8 males. For every 100 females age 18 and over, there were 110.0 males.

The median income for a household in the city was $11,250, and the median income for a family was $29,583. Males had a median income of $26,250 versus $10,833 for females. The per capita income for the city was $9,822. There were no families and 24.1% of the population living below the poverty line, including no under eighteens and 31.8% of those over 64.

== Notable people ==
- Ed Kringstad, politician and educator
