= Jasper Schneider =

American politician

Member of the North Dakota House of Representatives from the 21st district
- In office 2006 - 2009
- Preceded by: Sally Sandvig
- Succeeded by: Kathy Hogan

Personal details
- Born: June 20, 1979 (age 47) Fargo, North Dakota
- Party: North Dakota Democratic-NPL Party
- Spouse: Kim Schneider
- Children: 4
- Education: Hamline University School of Law (J.D.); Jamestown College (B.A.)
- Profession: Attorney

Jasper Schneider (born June 20, 1979) is a North Dakota Democratic-NPL Party politician. Schneider represented the 21st legislative district in the North Dakota House of Representatives from 2006 to 2009. In 2008, he ran for North Dakota Insurance Commissioner, losing narrowly with 49.7% of the vote. On September 30, 2009, Schneider was appointed USDA Rural Development state director for North Dakota.

Schneider resigned from the North Dakota House on November 3, 2009, after being appointed State Director for the USDA Rural Development. On October 1, 2014, Schneider was appointed to be the acting administrator of the USDA Rural Utilities Service, a federal agency with a loan portfolio of $60 billion responsible for provide electric, telecom, broadband and water utilities.

Party political offices
Vacant Title last held by Terry Barnes	Democratic nominee for North Dakota Insurance Commissioner; 2008	Succeeded by Tom Potter
