= Roxanne Jensen =

American politician from North Dakota

Member of the North Dakota House of Representatives from the 17th district
- In office 1997–2003? Serving with Ken Svedjan
- Preceded by: Rick Clayburgh
- Succeeded by: Louise Potter

Member of the North Dakota House of Representatives from the 17/18 district
- In office 1989–1993

Personal details
- Born: 1937 or 1938 (age 88–89)
- Party: Republican

Roxanne Jensen (born 1937 or 1938) is an American politician. She served three terms in the North Dakota House of Representatives as a Republican.

== Biography ==
Outside of politics, Jensen served as the executive director of the Prairie Harvest Foundation, a non-profit organization providing support for people with mental illnesses, from its founding in 1991 to her retirement in 1998. Following her retirement, she continued to serve as a member of the Foundation's board of directors.

Jensen was first elected in 1988, as one of four representatives from North Dakota's combined 17/18 district, and was re-elected in 1990. She ran for re-election in 1992, but lost nomination during the primary election by one vote.

Jensen ran again in 1996, winning election in the 17th district, alongside Republican incumbent Ken Svedjan. She served until 2002, when she chose not to run for re-election.
