= Alan Fehr =

American politician

Member of the North Dakota House of Representatives from the 36th district
- In office December 1, 2012 – December 1, 2016
- Preceded by: Shirley Meyer
- Succeeded by: Luke Simons

Personal details
- Party: Republican

Alan Fehr is an American politician who served in the North Dakota House of Representatives from the 36th district from 2012 to 2016.
