= Oscar E. Erickson =

American politician (1884–1945)

Oscar E. Erickson

Oscar E. Erickson (July 7, 1884 – August 15, 1945) was a North Dakota politician who served as the North Dakota Insurance Commissioner from 1937 to his death in 1945.

== Biography ==
Oscar Erickson was born on July 7, 1884, at Bloomer, Wisconsin, of immigrant parents. His parents had both emigrated from Norway. He finished his elementary and technical education in Wisconsin, and moved to North Dakota in 1905. He settled on a homestead near Tappen in Kidder County. Erickson managed his farm until his death.

Erickson was elected to the North Dakota House of Representatives in 1922, and served for 10 years until 1932. At that time, he was elected to the North Dakota Senate, where he served until 1936 when he was elected as Insurance Commissioner of North Dakota. He also served as a fieldman in the Real Estate department of the Bank of North Dakota from 1932 to 1935. He served as Insurance Commissioner from 1937 until his death on August 15, 1945.

Near to the end of the legislative session in 1945, Erickson was impeached by the House of Representatives and another commissioner of Insurance was appointed immediately by Governor Fred G. Aandahl. Erickson denied all the charges and assumed the position. In May, when the charges of the three-week Senate trial didn't secure the required two-thirds vote, Erickson was restored to the office, but died two months later.

== Bibliography ==
- North Dakota Secretary of State. North Dakota Blue Book (1942), pp. 17.
- North Dakota Secretary of State. North Dakota Blue Book (2005), pp. 333.

Party political offices
Preceded by Harold Hopton	Republican nominee for North Dakota Insurance Commissioner; 1936, 1938, 1940, 1942, 1944	Succeeded by Otto Krueger
Political offices
Preceded by Harold Hopton	Insurance Commissioner of North Dakota; 1937–1945	Succeeded by Otto Krueger
