= Wilhite =

Wilhite is a surname. Notable people with the surname include:

- Ingrid Wilhite (1959-2008), American filmmaker
- Irv J. Wilhite (1920–2020), American politician
- Jonathan Wilhite (born 1984), American football cornerback
- Mary Holloway Wilhite (1831–1892), American physician and philanthropist
- Sarah Wilhite Parsons (born 1995), American volleyball player
- Steve Wilhite (1948–2022), American computer scientist
