= List of majority leaders of the North Dakota Senate =

The following is a list of majority leaders of the North Dakota Senate, a position that was created in 1940 and first filled in 1941.

Number of North Dakota majority leaders by party affiliation
Party	Majority leaders
Republican	18
Republican	15
Republican/NPL	1
Republican/IVA	2
Democratic	2
Democratic-NPL	2

#	Name	Term	Party	District
1	Arthur W. Fowler	1941–1942	Republican/IVA	9
2	Milton R. Young	1943–1944	Republican/IVA	24
3	Clarence N. Brunsdale	1945–1950	Republican	8
4	Rilie R. Morgan	1951–1952	Republican	4
5	Reinhold M. Streibel	1953–1956	Republican/NPL	33
6	Roland E. Meidinger	1957–1958	Republican	23
7	Donald C. Holand	1959–1962	Republican	14
8	Gail H. Hernett	1963–1964	Republican	36
9	Donald C. Holand	1965–1966	Republican	14
10	Evan E. Lips	1967–1968	Republican	32
11	George Longmire	1969–1970	Republican	18
12	Irv J. Wilhite	1971–1972	Republican	32
13	C. Warner Litten	1973–1974	Republican	21
14	David E. Nething	1975–1986	Republican	29
15	William S. Heigaard	1987–1992	Democratic-NPL	10
16	Dan K. Wogsland	1993–1994	Democratic-NPL	23
17	Gary J. Nelson	1995–2001	Republican	22
18	Bob Stenehjem	2001–2011	Republican	30
19	Rich Wardner	2011–2022	Republican	37
20	David Hogue	2023–present	Republican	38

== See also ==
- List of North Dakota Legislative Assemblies
