= Sally Sandvig =

American politician

Member of the North Dakota House of Representatives from the 21st district
- In office December 1, 1994 – December 1, 2006
- Succeeded by: Jasper Schneider

Personal details
- Party: Republican (2006–present)
- Other political affiliations: Democratic (before 2006)

Sally Sandvig is an American politician who served in the North Dakota House of Representatives from the 21st district from 1994 to 2006.
