= Randy Boehning =

American politician (born 1962)

Member of the North Dakota House of Representatives from the 27th district
- In office 2002–2018
- Succeeded by: Ruth Buffalo

Personal details
- Born: September 17, 1962 (age 63) Hankinson, North Dakota, U.S.
- Party: Republican
- Education: North Dakota State College of Science (Associate's degree, Business Administration)
- Profession: Self-employed general contractor

Randy Boehning (born September 17, 1962) is an American politician. He was a member of the North Dakota House of Representatives from the 27th District, serving from 2002 to 2018. He is a member of the Republican Party. He received a BA from Moorhead State University, University of Wisconsin, Madison, 1994 and an AAS, Business Administration, North Dakota State College of Science, 1988–1990.

After voting against expanding gay rights in North Dakota Senate Bill 2279, Boehning was outed for sending an explicit photo and messages to another man on Grindr in April 2015; he initially claimed it was political retaliation for his vote. On April 30, 2015, Boehning was quoted by the Grand Forks Herald as saying he is "gay" and that he is "relieved to come out", and also said he is attracted to women.
