= Alfred J. Jensen =

American politician

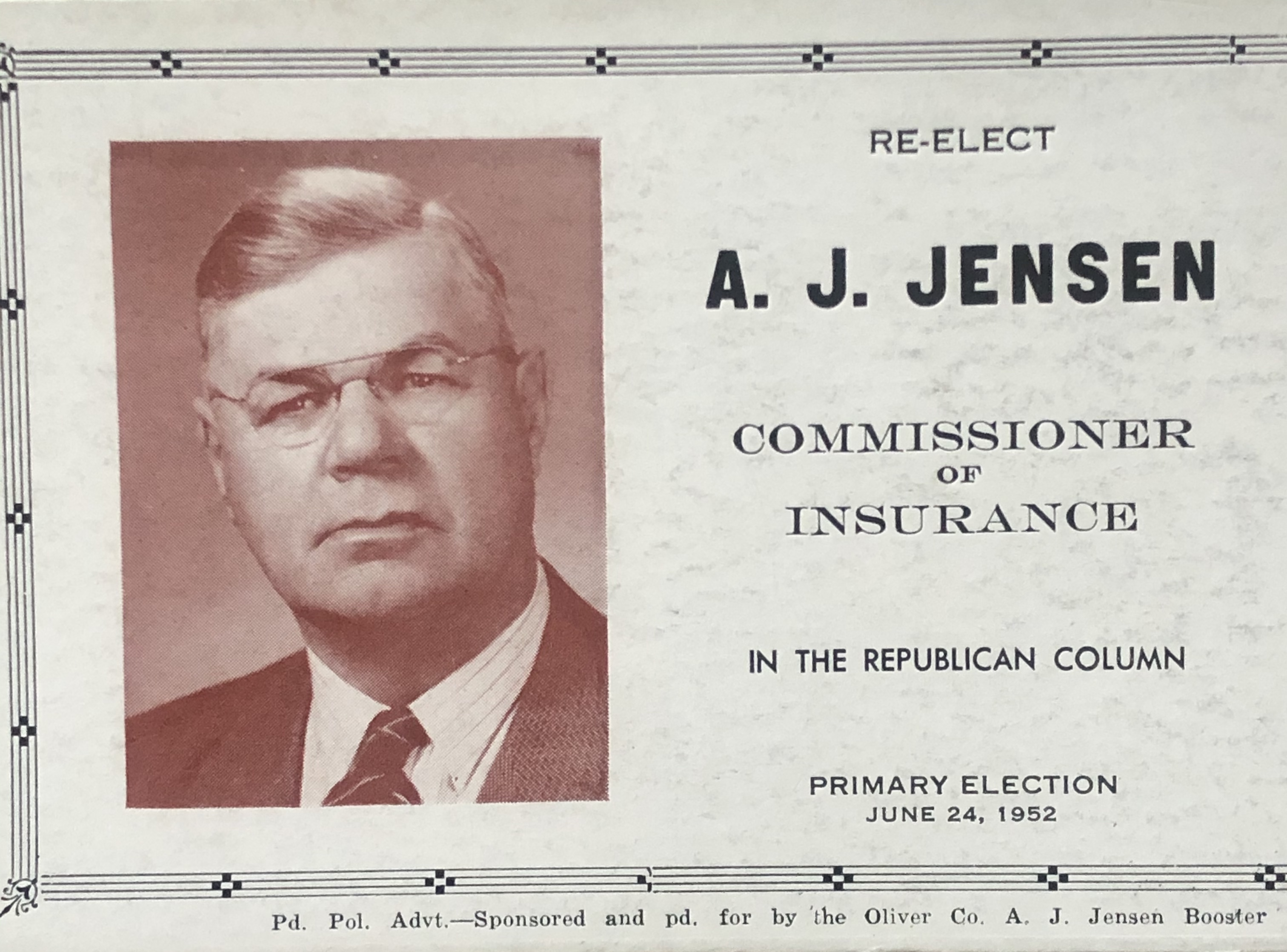
Re-election campaign 1952

Alfred J. "A.J." Jensen (August 19, 1893 – October 14, 1973) served as Insurance Commissioner for the State of North Dakota from 1951 to 1962.

== Biography ==
Jensen was born in Denmark in 1893 and came to the United States in 1904, emigrating with his family. His family settled in Columbia County, Wisconsin, where he continued his public education. Jensen farmed for twenty years in Dickey County, North Dakota. He subsequently elected public service serving as the Director of the Department of Weights and Measures for the State of North Dakota for eighteen years. He was elected Insurance Commissioner for North Dakota in 1950, re-elected in 1952, 1954, 1956, 1958, 1960. He did not seek re-election in 1962 and served as a consultant to the industry upon his retirement from public service. Jensen was a member of the Republican Party, the Shriners, Eagles, Elks, and the Lutheran Church. He died in 1973 and was buried at Sunset Memorial Gardens in Burleigh County, North Dakota.

== Other sources ==
- North Dakota Secretary of State. North Dakota Blue Book (1954), pp. 50.
- North Dakota Secretary of State. North Dakota Blue Book (1961), pp. 52.

Party political offices
Preceded by Otto Krueger	Republican nominee for North Dakota Insurance Commissioner; 1950, 1952, 1954, 1956, 1958, 1960	Succeeded by Frank Albers
Political offices
Preceded by Otto Krueger	Insurance Commissioner of North Dakota; 1951–1962	Succeeded by Frank Albers
