= Kenneth Kroeplin =

American politician

Member of the North Dakota Senate from the 23rd district
- In office December 1, 1998 – December 1, 2002
- Preceded by: Daniel Wogsland
- Succeeded by: Michael Every

Member of the North Dakota House of Representatives from the 23rd district
- In office December 1, 1996 – December 1, 1998
- Succeeded by: Dale Severson

Personal details
- Party: Democratic

Kenneth Kroeplin is an American politician who served in the North Dakota House of Representatives from the 23rd district from 1996 to 1998 and in the North Dakota Senate from the 23rd district from 1998 to 2002.
