= Elroy Lindaas =

American politician

Member of the North Dakota Senate from the 20th district
- In office 1991 – December 1, 2010
- Preceded by: Clark Ewen
- Succeeded by: Philip Murphy

Personal details
- Born: August 10, 1937 (age 89) Mayville, North Dakota
- Party: Democratic

Elroy Lindaas (born August 10, 1937) is an American politician who served in the North Dakota Senate from the 20th district from 1991 to 2010.
