= Gary Sukut =

American politician

Member of the North Dakota House of Representatives from the 1st district
- In office 2007–2019
- Succeeded by: David Richter

Personal details
- Born: February 17, 1941 (age 85)
- Party: Republican
- Spouse: Leora
- Profession: Businessman

Gary R. Sukut (born February 27, 1941) is an American politician in the state of North Dakota. He was a member of the North Dakota House of Representatives, representing the 1st district. A Republican, he was first elected in 2007. An alumnus of University of North Dakota (BA, MA), he is a retired businessman and former President of the Williston Chamber of Commerce.
