= Shirley Meyer =

American politician

Member of the North Dakota House of Representatives from the 36th district
- In office December 1, 2004 – December 1, 2012
- Preceded by: Frank Klein
- Succeeded by: Alan Fehr
- In office December 1, 1996 – December 1, 2000
- Preceded by: Clarence F. Martin
- Succeeded by: Frank Klein

Personal details
- Born: December 9, 1952 (age 73) Dickinson, North Dakota
- Party: Democratic

Shirley Meyer (born December 9, 1952) is an American politician who served in the North Dakota House of Representatives from the 36th district from 1996 to 2000 and from 2004 to 2012.
