= Tom Brusegaard =

American politician

Member of the North Dakota House of Representatives from the 19th district
- In office December 1, 1996 – December 1, 2006
- Succeeded by: Chris Griffin

Personal details
- Born: June 10, 1971 (age 55)
- Party: Republican

Tom Brusegaard (born June 10, 1971) is an American politician who served in the North Dakota House of Representatives from the 19th district from 1996 to 2006.
