= Amy Warnke =

American politician

Member of the North Dakota House of Representatives from the 42nd district
- In office December 1, 1994 – December 1, 2004
- Succeeded by: Donald Dietrich; Stacey Dahl

Personal details
- Party: Republican

Amy Warnke is an American politician who served in the North Dakota House of Representatives from the 42nd district from 1994 to 2004.
