= Richard W. Kunkel =

Politician

Member of the North Dakota House of Representatives from the 15th district
- In office December 1, 1990 – December 1, 1998
- Succeeded by: Curtis Brekke

Personal details
- Born: August 7, 1934 Southam, North Dakota, U.S.
- Died: January 13, 2026 (aged 91) Grand Forks, North Dakota
- Party: Republican
- Education: University of North Dakota
- Profession: educator

Richard William Kunkel (August 7, 1934 – January 13, 2026) was an American politician in the state of North Dakota. He was a member of the North Dakota House of Representatives from 1990 to 1998. He is an alumnus of Minot State University and the University of North Dakota, and was a former Devils Lake Superintendent of Schools.

He died on January 13, 2026, in Grand Forks, North Dakota at age 91.
