= Herbert Urlacher =

American politician (1931–2023)

Member of the North Dakota Senate from the 16th district
- In office 1993–2008

Personal details
- Born: December 30, 1931 New England, North Dakota, U.S.
- Died: October 29, 2023 (aged 91) Fargo, North Dakota, U.S.
- Party: Republican
- Profession: farmer, rancher

Herbert Urlacher (December 30, 1931 – October 29, 2023) was an American politician who was a member of the North Dakota State Senate. He represented the 36th district from 1993 to 2008 as a member of the Republican party. He also sat in the North Dakota House of Representatives from 1989 to 1992. He was an alumnus of the University of North Dakota. He was a farmer and rancher. Urlacher died in Fargo, North Dakota on October 29, 2023, at the age of 91.
