= Jim Poolman =

American politician (born 1970)

Chair of the North Dakota Republican Party Acting
- In office February 20, 2018 – March 20, 2018
- Preceded by: Kelly Armstrong
- Succeeded by: Rick Berg

Insurance Commissioner of North Dakota
- In office January 1, 2001 – August 31, 2007
- Governor: John Hoeven
- Preceded by: Glenn Pomeroy
- Succeeded by: Adam Hamm

Personal details
- Born: May 15, 1970 (age 56)
- Party: Republican
- Spouse: Nicole Poolman
- Education: University of North Dakota (BA)

Jim Poolman (born May 15, 1970, in Fargo, North Dakota) is a banker and former politician from the U.S. state of North Dakota. He served as Insurance Commissioner of North Dakota from 2001 until his resignation on August 31, 2007. He is the President of Jim Poolman Consulting Inc. a regulatory and compliance consulting company. He is also an active entrepreneur with other commercial businesses and holdings.

== Biography ==
Poolman was raised in Fargo, North Dakota and graduated from Fargo South High School in 1988. In 1992, he graduated from the University of North Dakota in Grand Forks with a Bachelor's Degree in Business Administration. Poolman then went on to be elected to the North Dakota House of Representatives as a Republican later in 1992, serving District 42. He worked as a Trust Officer for Bremer Bank, which is a Midwest banking corporation. Poolman was elected as North Dakota Insurance Commissioner in 2000, and took office in 2001. He was re-elected in 2004, when he received 64% of the vote against challenger Terry Barnes. He is married to Nicole, who is a teacher and former State Senator, and has three children; Collin, Grace, and Nicholas.

== Career ==
- North Dakota House of Representatives (1992—2000)
- North Dakota Insurance Commissioner (2001—2007)
- Jim Poolman Consulting Inc. (2007-pres.)

Political offices
Preceded by Glenn Pomeroy	Insurance Commissioner of North Dakota; 2001–2007	Succeeded by Adam Hamm
Party political offices
Vacant Title last held by Kent Olson	Republican nominee for North Dakota Insurance Commissioner; 2000, 2004	Succeeded by Adam Hamm
Preceded by Kelly Armstrong	Chair of the North Dakota Republican Party; Acting; 2018	Succeeded by Rick Berg
