= Si Tanka University =

Private online University

Coordinates: 43.499748°N 96.781665°W

- Type: Private/Not accredited
- Established: 2010
- President: Harold Harris
- Location: Sioux Falls, South Dakota, USA
- Colors: Gold and Burgundy
- Website: [Archived 22 March 2018 at the Wayback Machine]

Si Tanka University is an unaccredited private online university headquartered in Eagle Butte, South Dakota, United States.

== History ==
Chartered by Sioux Tribe in 1973, Si Tanka University started as the Cheyenne River Community College. The college then changed its name in July 1999 to honor one of its leaders, Si Tanka (Bigfoot). In May 2001, the small tribal college bought Huron University, a private, accredited four-year university established in 1883. Si Tanka/Huron University was notified in February 2002 that its accreditation had been approved by the Higher Learning Commission of the North Central Association of Colleges and Schools.

Due to financial difficulties, Si Tanka University was closed in 2006. The accreditation was subsequently withdrawn effective August 6, 2006. In 2010, a group of Si Tanka alumni reopened Si Tanka University as an unaccredited online university.
