= Oscar Erickson (American football) =

American football coach

Coaching career (HC unless noted)
- 1902: Marquette

Head coaching record
- Overall: 6–1–1

Oscar Erickson was an American college football coach. Erickson was the second head football coach at Marquette University located in Milwaukee and he held that position for the 1902 season. His coaching record at Marquette was 6–1–1.

== Head coaching record ==
Year	Team	Overall	Conference	Standing	Bowl/playoffs
Marquette Blue and Gold (Independent) (1902)
1902	Marquette	6–1–1			
Marquette:		6–1–1			
Total:		6–1–1			
