= Gerald Sveen =

American politician (1924–2021)

Gerald O. Sveen

Member of the North Dakota House of Representatives from the 6th district
- In office 1993–2000

Personal details
- Born: December 7, 1924 Bottineau, North Dakota, U.S.
- Died: September 23, 2021 (aged 96) Bemidji, Minnesota, U.S.
- Party: Republican
- Spouse: Ruth Ellen
- Children: three
- Education: University of North Dakota, Temple University
- Profession: dentist

Gerald Orlando Sveen (December 7, 1924 – September 23, 2021) was an American politician in the state of North Dakota. He was a member of the North Dakota House of Representatives from 1993 to 2000. An alumnus of Temple University and the University of North Dakota, he worked as a dentist. He was also mayor of Bottineau, North Dakota, and a World War II and Korean War veteran. Sveen died in September 2021, at the age of 96.
