= Elwood Thorpe =

American politician (1929–2021)

Member of the North Dakota House of Representatives from the 5th district
- In office 1997–2010
- In office 1991–1993

Personal details
- Born: February 5, 1929 North Dakota, United States
- Died: March 29, 2021 (aged 92) Minot, North Dakota, United States
- Party: Democratic
- Profession: auto dealer

Elwood C. "Woody" Thorpe (February 5, 1929 - March 29, 2021), was an American politician who was a member of the North Dakota State House of Representatives. He was a Democrat. He was an alumnus of the University of North Dakota. He was a retired automotive dealer and alumnus of Wahpeton School of Science and Junior College.
