= Tom Freier =

American politician and public servant

Tom D. Freier is a North Dakota politician and public servant with the North Dakota Republican Party who served in the North Dakota House of Representatives from 1991 to 1998, and as the Director of the North Dakota Department of Transportation in 2003. Since his retirement from the Department of Transportation in 2006 after 8 years of service, Freier has been serving as the Executive Director of the North Dakota Family Alliance.
