= Darlene Watne =

American politician

Member of the North Dakota Senate from the 5th district
- In office December 1, 1994 – December 1, 2002
- Succeeded by: Tom Seymour

Personal details
- Born: February 11, 1935 Minot, North Dakota
- Died: October 12, 2012 (aged 77) Minot, North Dakota
- Party: Republican

Darlene Watne (February 11, 1935 – October 12, 2012) was an American politician who served in the North Dakota Senate from the 5th district from 1994 to 2002.

She died of cancer on October 12, 2012, in Minot, North Dakota at age 77.
