= Ed Kringstad =

American politician

Edroy A. Kringstad (March 28, 1937 – May 4, 2013) was an American educator and politician.

Kringstad was born in Fairdale, North Dakota. He was the son of Ernest O. Kringstad (1910-1970) and Alice G. (Aamot) Kringstad (1917-2012). He graduated from Valley City State University and received his master's degree from University of North Dakota. Kringstad taught at Bismarck State College and was the wrestling coach. He was named twice NWCA National Junior College Coach of the Year (1974 and 1986) and was inducted into the National Junior College Athletic Association Wrestling Hall of Fame in 1978. He was inducted into the Viking Hall of Fame at Valley City State (1993).

Kringstad served in the North Dakota State Senate (1995-2006) as a Republican. He died in Bismarck, North Dakota.
