= Laurel Thoreson =

American politician

Member of the North Dakota House of Representatives from the 13th district
- In office December 1, 1994 – December 1, 2002
- Succeeded by: Alon Wieland

Personal details
- Born: July 24, 1934 Hetland, South Dakota
- Died: December 2, 2020 (aged 86) West Fargo, North Dakota
- Party: Republican

Laurel Thoreson (July 24, 1934 – December 2, 2020) was an American politician who served in the North Dakota House of Representatives from the 13th district from 1994 to 2002.

He died on December 2, 2020, in West Fargo, North Dakota at age 86.
