= Carol A. Niemeier =

American politician (1934–2021)

Member of the North Dakota House of Representatives from the 20th district
- In office December 1, 1996 – December 1, 2004
- Preceded by: Lee Kaldor
- Succeeded by: Lee Kaldor

Personal details
- Born: July 4, 1934 Buxton, North Dakota, U.S.
- Died: December 14, 2021 (aged 87) Mayville, North Dakota
- Party: Democratic

Carol Ann Oline Niemeier (July 4, 1934 – December 14, 2021) was an American politician who served in the North Dakota House of Representatives from the 20th district from 1996 to 2004. Niemeier died in Mayville, North Dakota on December 14, 2021, at the age of 87.
