= Irv J. Wilhite =

American politician (1920–2020)

Irvin J. Wilhite Jr.

Member of the North Dakota Senate from the 32nd district
- In office 1967–1972

Personal details
- Born: May 29, 1920 Stickney, South Dakota, US
- Died: March 15, 2020 (aged 99) Costa Rica
- Party: Republican

Irvin J. Wilhite Jr. (May 29, 1920 – March 15, 2020) was an American politician. He served in the North Dakota State Senate from 1967 to 1972, and was majority leader from 1971 to 1972. He died in March 2020 at the age of 99. He owned a cattle ranch in Costa Rica during his retired years.
