= Statue of Sakakawea (Crunelle) =

Statue by Leonard Crunelle

Sakakawea
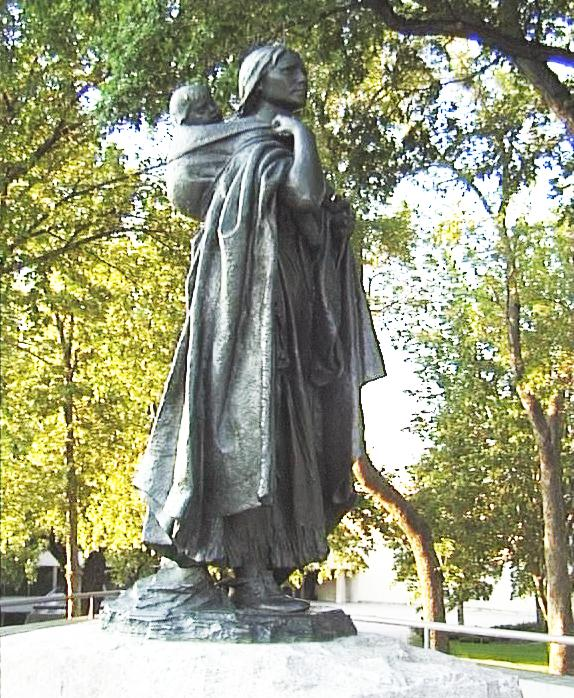
- The statue on the North Dakota State Capitol grounds in 2004
- Medium: Bronze sculpture
- Subject: Sakakawea
- Location: Bismarck, North Dakota, U.S.

Sakakawea (or Bird Woman or Sacajawea) is a monumental sized bronze sculpture created by Leonard Crunelle. It was dedicated on October 13, 1914 and stands on the grounds of the North Dakota State Capitol in Bismarck, North Dakota. A recasting was done in 2003 to place in the United States Capitol.

== Description ==
The statue is a full-length figure of Sakakawea (also called Sacagawea or Sacajawea) carrying her baby, Jean Baptiste Charbonneau, on her back. It carries the inscription:

Sakakawea
The Shoshone Indian "Birdwoman" who in 1805 guided the Lewis and Clark Expedition
From the Missouri River to the Yellowstone
Erected by the Federated Clubwomen and Schoolchildren of North Dakota
Presented to the State October 1910.

Crunelle used an Hidatsa woman, Mink Woman, as his model for the 12-foot-tall (3.7 m) statue that stands on a large rock on the east side of the capitol grounds. The statue was funded in part by the North Dakota federation of Women's Clubs.

== National Statuary Hall Collection ==
Another casting of the work was made in 2003 and was placed in the National Statuary Hall Collection in the Capitol Building in Washington, D.C., one of the two statues there from North Dakota.

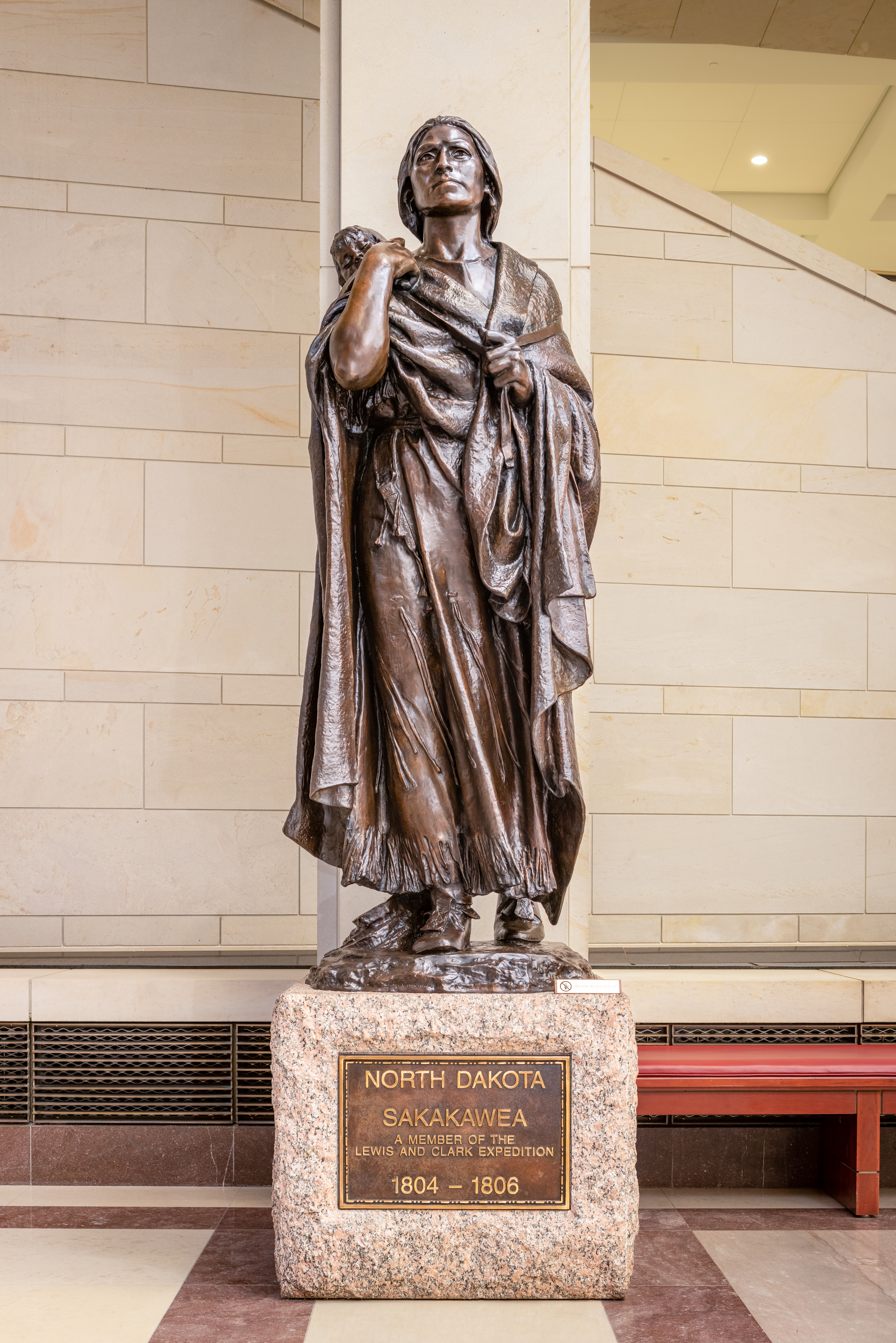
The statue in the National Statuary Hall Collection

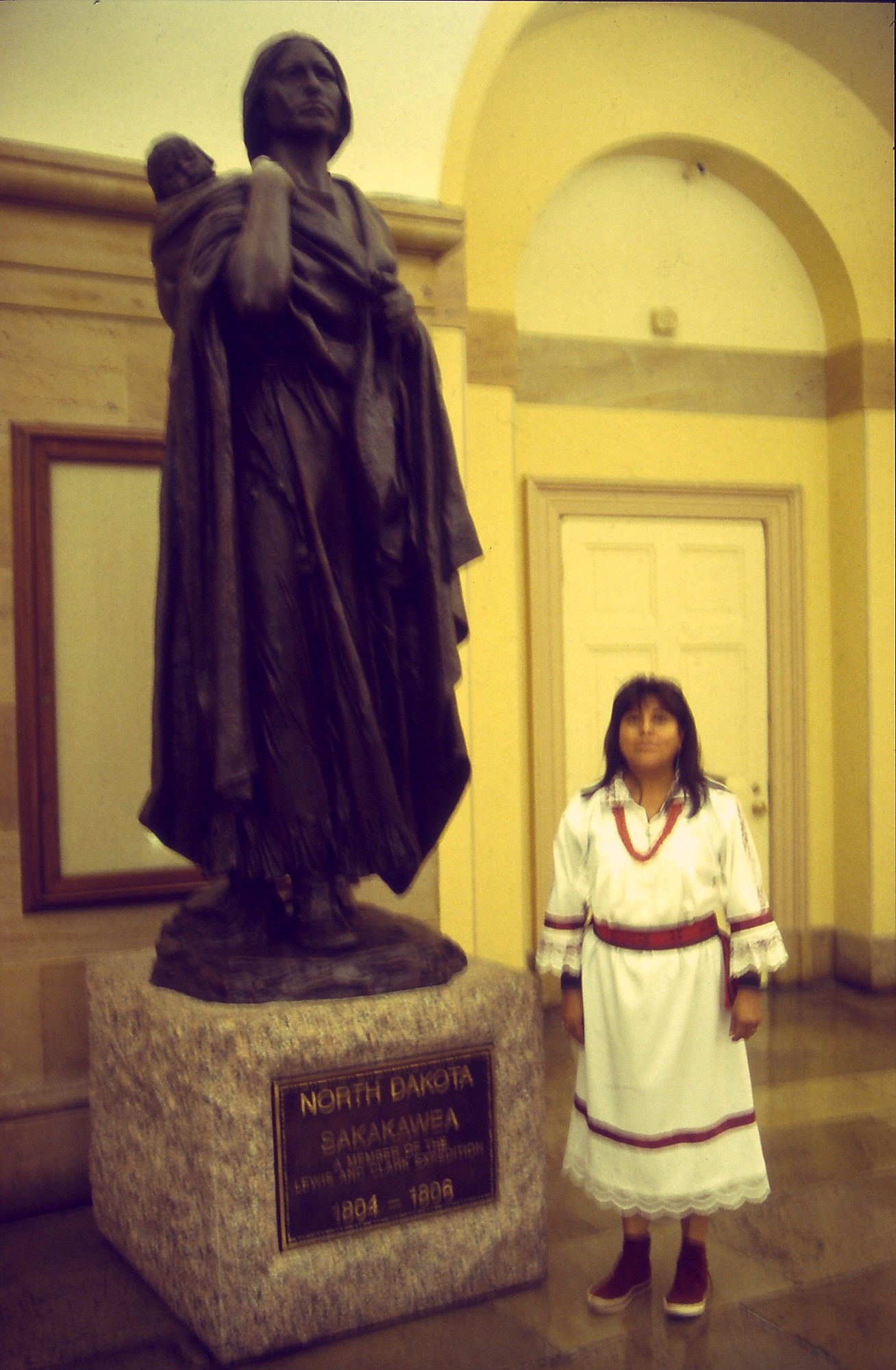
Native woman with statue, Washington, D.C.

== See also ==
- 1910 in art
- Sacagawea dollar
- Sacajawea and Jean-Baptiste (sculpture), Portland, Oregon
- Lewis and Clark (sculpture), Salem, Oregon
- Meriwether Lewis and William Clark (sculpture), Charlottesville, Virginia
- Oregon History (mural), Portland, Oregon
