= Arlo Schmidt =

American politician (1931–2022)

Member of the North Dakota House of Representatives from the 7th district
- In office 1995–2010

Personal details
- Born: September 6, 1931 Cathay, North Dakota, U.S.
- Died: November 30, 2022 (aged 91) Northwood, North Dakota, U.S.
- Party: North Dakota Democratic-NPL Party
- Spouse: Marion
- Occupation: Auctioneer

Arlo E. Schmidt (September 6, 1931 – November 30, 2022) was a North Dakota Democratic-NPL Party member of the North Dakota House of Representatives, representing the 7th district from 1995 to 2010.

Schmidt served in the United States Army and was an auctioneer. He died at his home in Northwood on November 30, 2022, aged 91.
