= Jon Godfread =

American politician

Insurance Commissioner of North Dakota
- Incumbent
- Assumed office January 1, 2017
- Governor: Doug Burgum; Kelly Armstrong
- Preceded by: Adam Hamm

Personal details
- Born: 1981 or 1982 (age 43–44)
- Party: Republican
- Education: University of Northern Iowa (BA); University of North Dakota (JD, MBA)

Jonathan Godfread (born 1981/1982) is an American politician from the state of North Dakota. A member of the Republican Party, he is the North Dakota Insurance Commissioner, and has served in the role since 2016.

== Early life and career ==
Godfread is from Grand Forks, North Dakota. He attended Red River High School, and played for the school's basketball team. He graduated in 2000. He committed to attend the University of Utah to play college basketball for the Utah Utes men's basketball team. After taking a redshirt for Utah in his freshman year, he decided to transfer to the University of Northern Iowa. He played college basketball for the Northern Iowa Panthers, who qualified for the NCAA Division I men's basketball tournament in 2004 and 2005. Godfread graduated from Northern Iowa in 2005. After his college basketball career, Godfread played professionally in Germany for the Ehingen Urspring of ProA for one season.

Godfread returned to the United States and enrolled at the University of North Dakota, where he graduated with a Master of Business Administration and Juris Doctor in 2011. He worked for Alerus Financial and served as vice president for the Greater North Dakota Chamber.

== Political career ==
After the incumbent North Dakota Insurance Commissioner, Adam Hamm, announced he would not seek reelection in 2016, Godfread announced his candidacy to succeed him. Godfread was elected state insurance commissioner, defeating Democrat Ruth Buffalo. As Insurance Commissioner, Godfread supported Wayne Stenehjem's decision to join California v. Texas, opposing the constitutionality of the Affordable Care Act. Godfread was reelected unopposed in 2020 and 2024.

== Personal life ==
Godfread and Amanda (née Hvidsten) became engaged in 2011. They married and have three children.

After Guinness World Records certified Robert Cornegy as the World's Tallest Politician in January 2019, Godfread challenged the record. In November, Guinness World Records certified Godfread as the World's Tallest Politician at 210.76 centimetres (6 ft 10.98 in), surpassing Cornegy, who was measured at 209.6 centimetres (6 ft 10.5 in).

Party political offices
Preceded by Adam Hamm	Republican nominee for Insurance Commissioner of North Dakota; 2016, 2020, 2024	Most recent
Political offices
Preceded by Adam Hamm	Insurance Commissioner of North Dakota; 2017–present	Incumbent
