= Harvey Sand =

American politician from North Dakota (1927–2019)

Member of the North Dakota Senate from the 10th district
- In office 1993–2000

Personal details
- Born: January 20, 1927 North Dakota, United States
- Died: August 11, 2019 (aged 92)
- Party: Republican
- Spouse: Eleanor
- Children: Five

Harvey Frederick Sand (January 20, 1927 – August 11, 2019), was an American politician who was a member of the North Dakota State Senate. He served from 1993 to 2000. He served in the United States Army.
