= Ken Svedjan =

American politician

Member of the North Dakota House of Representatives from the 17th district
- In office December 1, 1990 – December 1, 2010
- Succeeded by: Mark Owens; Mark Sanford

Personal details
- Born: 1941 or 1942 (age 83–84)
- Party: Republican

Ken Svedjan (born 1941 or 1942) is an American politician who served in the North Dakota House of Representatives from the 17th district from 1990 to 2010. During his time in the House, he served as the chair of the House Human Services Committee, and later the House Appropriations Committee.
