= Mark Owens (North Dakota politician) =

American politician

Member of the North Dakota House of Representatives from the 17th district
- Incumbent
- Assumed office 2005–2008 (Dist 18); 2011–2022 (Dist 17)

Personal details
- Party: Republican
- Profession: executive

Mark S. Owens is an American politician. He has served as a Republican member for the 17th district in the North Dakota House of Representatives since 2011.
