= Jon Nelson (politician) =

American politician (born 1953)

Jon O. Nelson

Member of the North Dakota House of Representatives from the 14th district
- Incumbent
- Assumed office 1996

Personal details
- Born: January 6, 1953 (age 73) Rugby, North Dakota, United States
- Party: Republican

Jon O. Nelson (born January 6, 1953) is an American politician. He is a member of the North Dakota House of Representatives from the 14th District, serving on the legislature since 1996. He is a member of the Republican Party.
