= Glen Froseth =

American politician (born 1934)

Member of the North Dakota House of Representatives from the 4th district
- Incumbent
- Assumed office 1993

Personal details
- Born: January 24, 1934 (age 92) Glendive, Montana
- Party: Republican
- Spouse: Donna
- Profession: Newspaper publisher

Glen A. Froseth (born January 24, 1934) is an American politician from North Dakota, serving as a member of the North Dakota House of Representatives, where he represents the 4th district. A Republican, Froseth was first elected in 1992.

He is an alumnus of the North Dakota State College of Science and is also a former newspaper publisher. Froseth has held leadership positions, including serving as a former president of the North Dakota Newspaper Association.
