= Patrick Hatlestad =

American politician (born 1943)

Member of the North Dakota House of Representatives from the 1st district
- Incumbent
- Assumed office 2007
- Succeeded by: Laurie Garbel (elect)

Personal details
- Born: September 5, 1943 (age 83) Northwood, North Dakota, U.S.
- Party: Republican
- Spouse: Durelle
- Profession: Teacher

Patrick Hatlestad (born September 5, 1943) is an American politician in the state of North Dakota. He is a member of the North Dakota House of Representatives, representing the 1st district. A Republican, he was first elected in 2007. An alumnus of University of North Dakota and Western Washington University, he is a retired teacher and former President of the Tri-County Economic Development Board, and Williston Chamber of Commerce.
