= North Dakota Legislative Assembly =

Legislative branch of the state government of North Dakota

Type
- Type: Bicameral
- Houses: Senate; House of Representatives
- Term limits: 2 terms in each house

Leadership
- Senate President: Michelle Strinden (R) since December 15, 2024
- Senate President pro tempore: Kyle Davison (R) since April 10, 2025
- House Speaker: Robin Weisz (R) since January 7, 2025

Structure
- Seats: 141 voting members: 47 senators; 94 representatives
- Senate political groups: Republican (42); Democratic-NPL (5)
- House of Representatives political groups: Republican (83); Democratic-NPL (11)

Elections
- Last Senate election: November 5, 2024
- Last House of Representatives election: November 5, 2024
- Next Senate election: November 3, 2026
- Next House of Representatives election: November 3, 2026

Meeting place
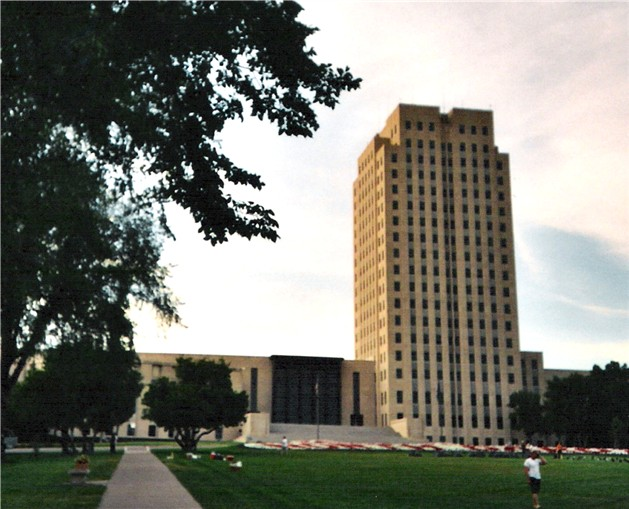
- North Dakota State Capitol; Bismarck

Website
- https://ndlegis.gov/assembly

The North Dakota Legislative Assembly is the state legislature of the U.S. state of North Dakota. The Legislative Assembly consists of two chambers, the lower North Dakota House of Representatives, with 94 representatives, and the upper North Dakota Senate, with 47 senators. The state is divided into 47 constituent districts, with two representatives and one senator elected from each district. Due to the Legislative Assembly being a biennial legislature, with the House and Senate sitting for only 80 days in odd-numbered years, a Legislative Council oversees legislative affairs in the interim periods, doing longer-term studies of issues, and drafting legislation for consideration of both houses during the next session.

Members of both houses are limited to two four-year terms since January 2023. Prior to this, members were elected without term limits.

The Legislative Assembly convenes in the west chamber of the 19-story Art Deco state capitol building in Bismarck.

== Constitutional mandates ==
According to Article IV, Section 1 of the North Dakota Constitution, the Senate must be composed of no fewer than 40 senators, and no more than 54. Similarly, the House of Representatives must be composed of no fewer than 80 and no more than 108 representatives. Section 2 states that the Legislative Assembly can divide the state into as many legislative districts of compact and contiguous territory as there are senators. A senator and at least two representatives must be apportioned to each senatorial district and be elected at large or from subdistricts from those districts. The Legislative Assembly may combine two senatorial districts only when a single member senatorial district includes a federal facility or federal installation, containing over two-thirds of the population of a single member senatorial district, and may provide for the election of senators at-large and representatives at-large from subdistricts from those districts.

On September 1, 1970, North Dakota voters approved calling a constitutional convention. As part of the convention, on April 28, 1972, North Dakota held a ballot referral on whether the legislature should remain bicameral or become unicameral. While voters approved a change to a unicameral legislature by nearly 70-30, it would have only taken effect if the voters also approved the new state constitution on the same ballot, but it was rejected 62.69-37.31.

In addition to a four-year term for both houses of the Legislative Assembly, Section 3 states that one-half of the members of the Senate and one-half of the members of the House of Representatives must be elected biennially. Originally, the North Dakota Constitution limited members of the North Dakota House of Representatives to two-year terms, with the all representatives standing for reelection at the same time. In 1996, the voters approved a constitutional amendment that changed the term for representatives to four-years with staggered terms. The amendment went into effect July 1, 1997, and was first applied in the 1998 elections. In 2022, they also approved another amendment, a measure that imposed a two-term limit for assembly members elected since that year. All statutes passed by the Legislative Assembly and signed by the governor become part of the North Dakota Century Code.

== Qualifications ==
Members of both houses elected to the Legislative Assembly must be, on the day of the election, a qualified elector from their home district and must be a resident of North Dakota for one year immediately prior to their election.

== Legislative management ==
Due to the biennial nature of the legislature, legislation, research, committee reports, and testimony during interim periods is provided by the Legislative Management. Legislative Management consists of 17 legislators, including the majority and minority leaders of both houses and the Speaker of the House. The Speaker appoints six other representatives, three from the majority party and three from the minority party as recommended by the majority and minority leaders, respectively. The Lieutenant Governor, as President of the Senate, appoints four senators from the majority and two from the minority as recommended by the majority and minority leaders, though the Senate President does not sit on Legislative Management.

== Meeting places ==
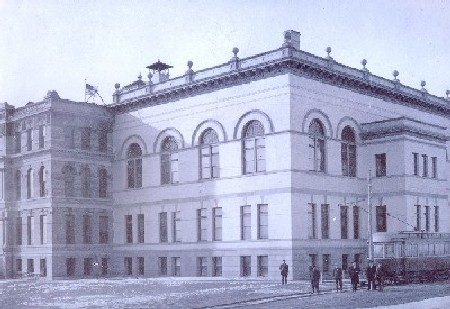
The first State Capitol building at the beginning of the 20th century.

Built between 1883 and 1884, the original territorial (and later) state capitol building served as the home to the Legislative Assembly until the morning of December 28, 1930, when the original building burned down. During the fire, Secretary of State Robert Byrne saved the original copy of the state constitution, but suffered cuts and burns on his hands while breaking a window to reach the document. In the interim period without a capitol, the Legislative Assembly convened in both the War Memorial Building and the City Auditorium in Bismarck. Under the approval of Governor George F. Shafer, the current Art Deco capitol was built as a replacement between 1931 and 1934 in the midst of the Great Depression.

== See also ==
- North Dakota State Capitol
- North Dakota House of Representatives
- North Dakota Senate
- List of North Dakota Legislative Assemblies
