= North Dakota State Capitol =

State capitol building of the U.S. state of North Dakota

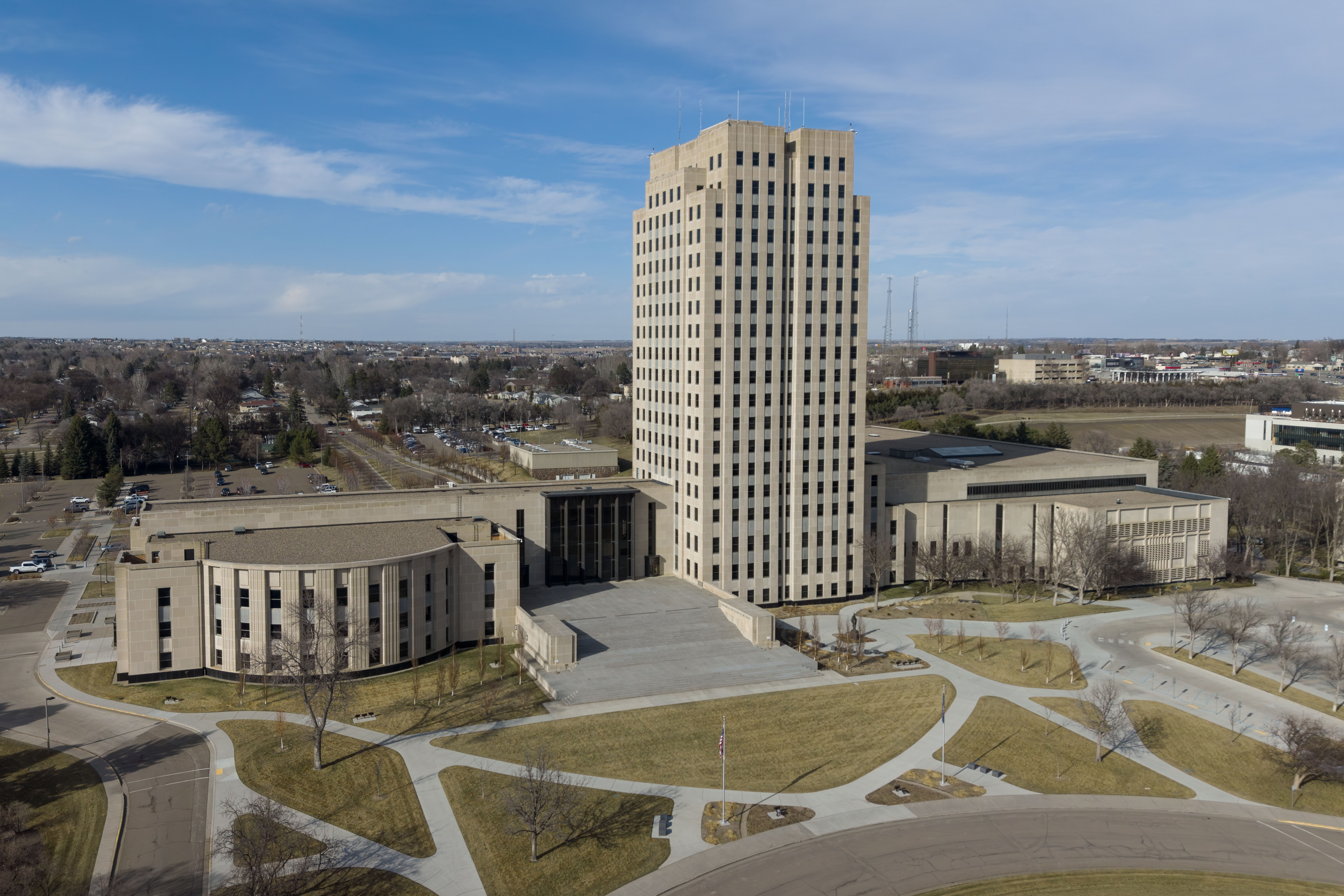
- View from south in 2026

Record height
- Tallest in North Dakota since 1934^{[I]}

General information
- Architectural style: Art Deco
- Location: 600 East Boulevard Avenue; Bismarck, North Dakota, U.S.
- Coordinates: 46.8208°N 100.7824°W
- Groundbreaking: 1932; 94 years ago
- Completed: 1934; 92 years ago
- Cost: $50 million

Height
- Tip: 241 ft 8 in (73.66 m)
- Roof: closed
- Observatory: 18th floor

Technical details
- Floor count: 18

Design and construction
- Architects: Joseph Bell DeRemer; William F. Kurke

Other information
- Public transit: Bis-Man Transit

The North Dakota State Capitol is the house of government of the U.S. state of North Dakota. The capitol, a 21-story Art Deco tower, is located in Bismarck at 600 East Boulevard Avenue, and is the tallest habitable building in the state. On a 160-acre (0.6 km^{2}) campus that also houses many other government buildings, the capitol building and the surrounding office buildings house the state's legislative and judicial branches, as well as many government agencies.

The State Capitol is largely surrounded by state government buildings. The parks, walking trails, and monuments on the grounds provide a great deal of information about the state's history, making it one of the city's tourist attractions. Six buildings occupy the grounds; constructed as the government grew. Not all state agencies are housed on the grounds, however: a large number are spread throughout the city in other facilities. The state facility management division developed plans for a massive expansion and improvement of the grounds in 2000, but very little of the plan had been implemented by 2012.

== History ==
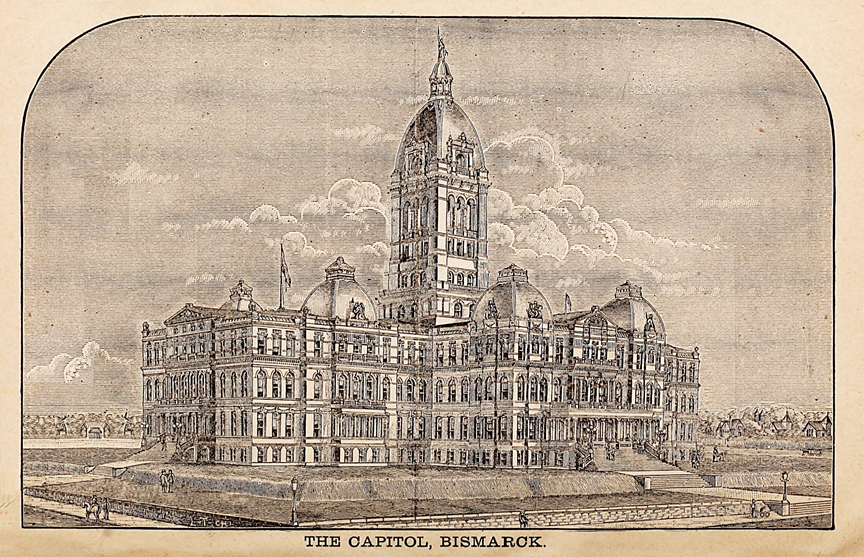
The territorial capitol as designed by the Minneapolis architectural firm of Caulkins and Telford in 1883

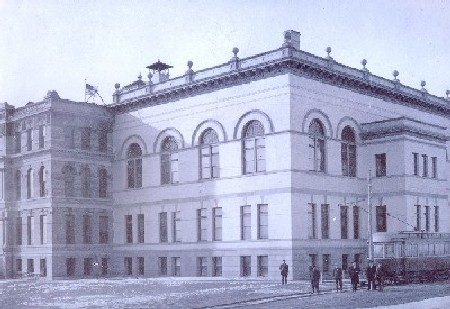
The First State Capitol building - 1903 wing

The first capitol building was constructed between 1883 and 1884 to house the territorial government, and after statehood, two additions were erected: the Senate wing (1894, south side), and the House wing (ca. 1903, north side). On the morning of December 28, 1930, smoke was spotted coming from the northeast part of the original building, and despite the fire department being summoned within minutes, it was too late to save the structure. Even as the fire raged through the upper portions of the building, efforts were made by citizens and state employees to rescue what was possible before everyone was ordered out of the building mid-morning. It was later determined to likely have originated in a pile of oily rags in a janitor's closet on the top floor of the main part of the building, as work had been underway to clean and varnish the legislators' desks in preparation for the upcoming legislative session. North Dakota Secretary of State Robert Byrne saved the original copy of the state's constitution, but suffered cuts and burns on his hands while breaking a window to reach the document. Another state employee, Jennie Ulsrud, burned her hands when she attempted to save records in the state treasurer's office. Governor George F. Shafer came back from his visit to St. Paul, Minnesota while the fire was still burning. Upon arrival, he immediately assembled a team of state legislators and officials to discuss plans for coping with the loss of records and work space. As soon as it was safe to enter the interior of the still smoldering building, 40 state prison inmates were used to salvage the various departments' vaults and other items from the ruins (some vaults were burned, but most were found to be intact when opened). The Legislature met temporarily in Bismarck's War Memorial Building and the City Auditorium, an annex being constructed to link the two. State offices were spread out across all available space across town, including an entire floor of the Patterson Hotel downtown. Such was the need for space that the unburned lower floors of the original capitol's 1903 wing were even repaired and returned to use.

The disaster required the construction of a new building during the Great Depression. The tower and wing were built between 1931 and 1934, at a cost of $2 million. Governor George F. Shafer broke ground for the building on August 13, 1932. Workers on the building were paid only 30 cents an hour and, after multiple worker strikes, the capitol grounds were administered by martial law in June 1933. The state sold half of the original capitol campus to defray the cost of construction. Artist Edgar Miller was brought in to do much of the interior design and decoration as well as the bas-relief sculptures on the facade which depict the human history of North Dakota.

The new 19-story capitol was expected to provide ample space for years to come, however it quickly filled as the state government expanded. The Liberty Memorial Building, completed in 1924, had housed some state offices, but to meet the ongoing need for office space, the state purchased the original Bismarck Junior College building (erected on the southeast corner of the campus in 1955) in 1959. This was followed by a new governor's residence, erected in 1960 to replace a territorial-era residence south of the Capitol campus, and the North Dakota Department of Transportation building in 1968. The State Historical Society of North Dakota moved from the Liberty Memorial Building into the new North Dakota Heritage Center in 1980. The next major addition to the Capitol campus was the Judicial Wing (housing the North Dakota Supreme Court and related offices) on the east side of the Capitol Building in 1981.

== Layout ==
The state capitol grounds has five buildings: the capitol building, the Department of Transportation Building, the North Dakota Heritage Center, the Liberty Memorial Building, and the governor's residence. Also, the campus holds Myron Atkinson Park and the Capitol Park. Through the center of the grounds is the Capitol Mall, a large open field of grass with walking paths lined by American elm trees. The Mall was the site of the state's snow angel world record breaking in 2007, with 8,962 people sprawled out on the snow-covered mall; a picture was taken from the top of the Capitol tower.

== Buildings ==
=== State Capitol ===
The capitol building is a 241.67-foot (73.7 m) tall, 21-story, Art Deco, high rise designed by North Dakota architects Joseph Bell DeRemer of Grand Forks and William F. Kurke of Fargo in conjunction with the noted Chicago firm of Holabird and Root, It is the tallest building in North Dakota and is known as the Skyscraper on the Prairie. This tower houses the office of the governor and the offices of multiple state agencies and departments. At the tower's base, in the west wing, the two chambers of the legislature meet when in session while the state supreme court meets in the east wing. The 18th floor of the Capitol is an observation deck with the highest vantage point in the state.

The south side of the Capitol building features a drive-through tunnel which leads to an entrance to the building. This was accessible by public vehicles until 2001 when it was closed due to security measures after the September 11, 2001, attacks. Today, only pedestrians are able to enter the tunnel. In 1988, U.S. President George H. W. Bush presented and dedicated an American elm tree near the Capitol steps in commemoration of the state's Centennial of 1989.

The many windows on the capitol building's tower are used for several ongoing traditions. During the Christmas season, red and green shades are drawn over the windows and lights are turned on in certain offices to make a pattern that resembles a Christmas tree. During the New Year's Eve, office lights are turned on to spell out the new year; the first two numbers of the new year are given on the top half, and the last two numbers on the bottom. This tradition began during the 1970s, and is now done on all four sides of the building; the Christmas tree tradition began as early as the 1940s.

Tours of the capitol building are available on weekdays. Weekend tours are available Memorial Day through Labor Day. Tours include stops throughout both the building's legislative and judicial wings as well as an elevator ride to the top of the tower.

==== Judicial Wing ====
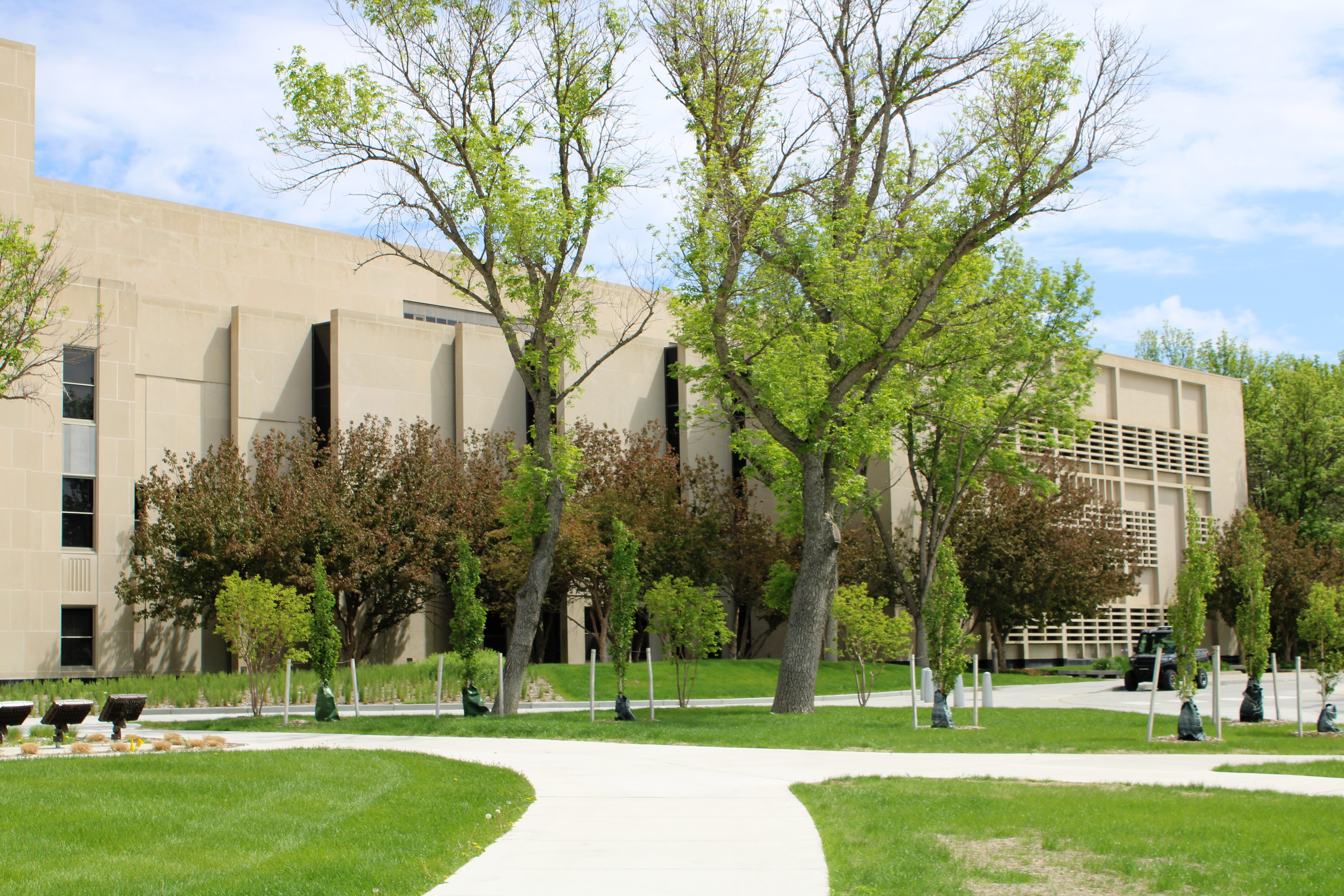
Judicial Wing

The judicial wing serves as a hub for the state supreme court and its support staff, as well as office space for state agencies like the Department of Health and the Department of Human Resources. The design for the building began in May 1977, construction began in April 1979 and it was finished completely and occupied by 1981. The size of the Judicial Wing is 168,400 square feet (15,640 m^{2}) and was built at a cost of $10.5 million. The dedication for the addition was held on November 15, 1981, with both Governor Allen Olson and former Governor Arthur A. Link present at the ceremony. Included in the wing is the Capitol lunchroom, which serves food to state employees and even the general public on weekdays.

Prior to the 2017 Legislative Assembly, two new committee rooms were added in the Judicial Wing (in a space vacated by the Information Technology Department). These rooms are used by various legislative committees when the Assembly is in session, and by the Judicial branch when the Legislature is not meeting.

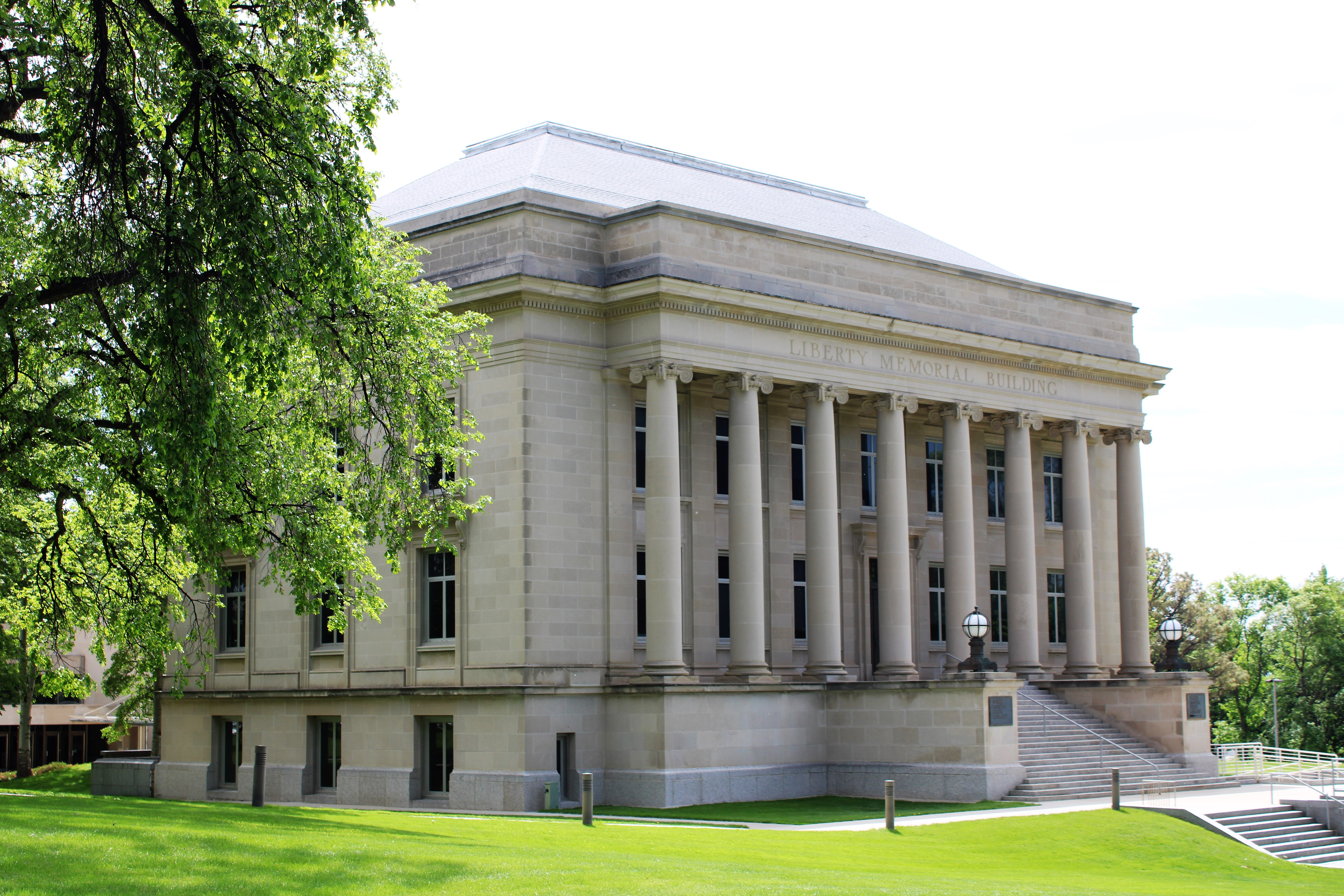
Liberty Memorial Building

=== Liberty Memorial Building ===
The Liberty Memorial Building is home to the State Library, as well as offices for the North Dakota Parks & Recreation Department. The building's construction was authorized by the state's legislature in 1919 in response to an increase of governmental departments and the project was finished by 1924 with a cost of $350,000. The building originally housed the State Historical Society Museum, the Adjutant General, the State Library Commission, and the supreme court until the State Library occupied it. The building is the oldest facility still on the capitol grounds and was renovated in 1982 to conform with modern building codes.

=== Department of Transportation building ===
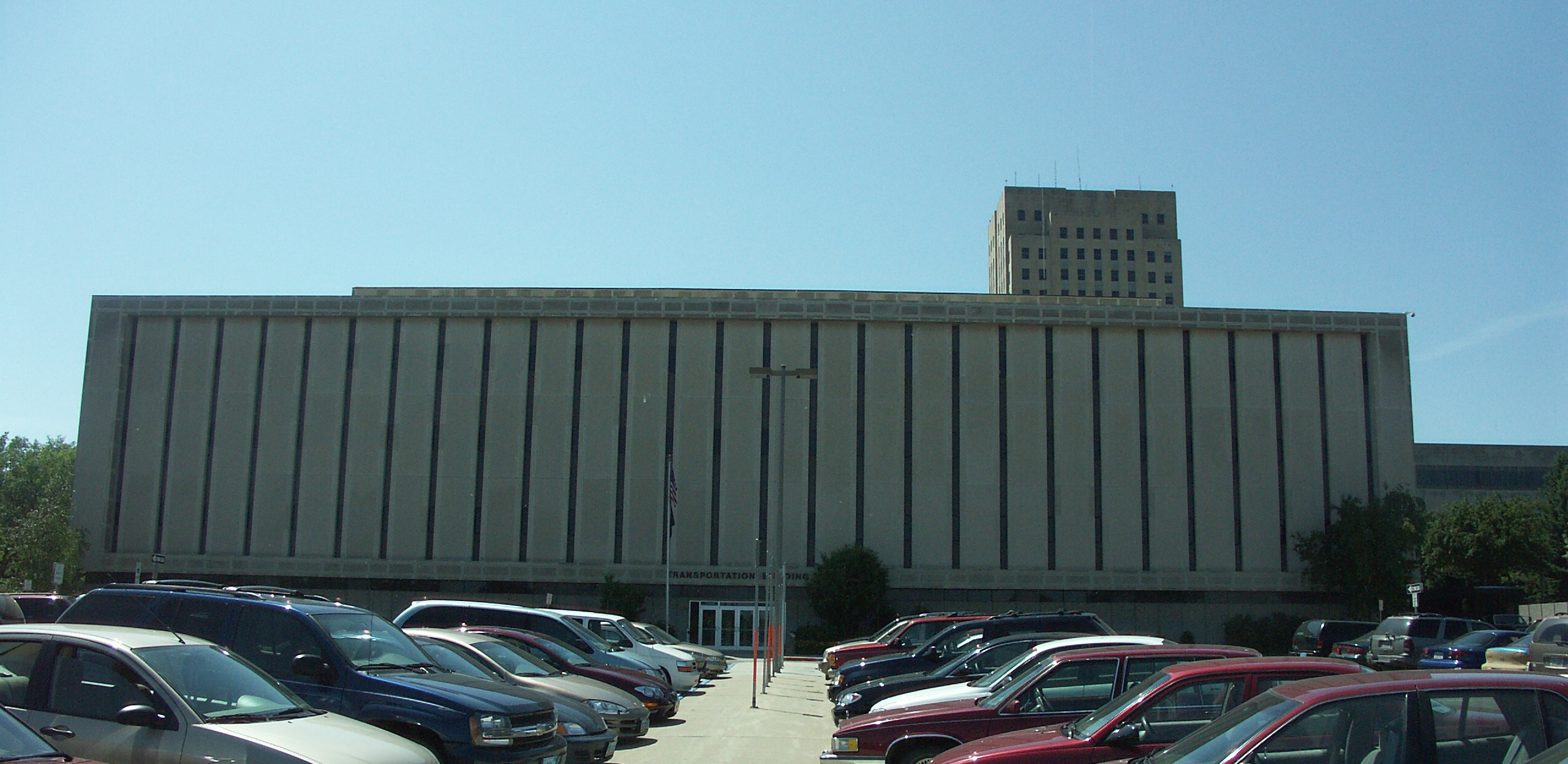
The Department of Transportation Building

The North Dakota Department of Transportation Building is home to the central office of the state's transportation department, as well as small divisions of other agencies. The building was completed in 1968 with materials that harmonize visually with the earlier structures. Before it was consolidated in this building, the Department of Transportation, known then as the State Highway Department, occupied several buildings around the campus including the State Office Building and the capitol. The building contains 125,000 square feet (11,600 m^{2}) of space and is just to the east of the capitol tower. While above ground the building is separated from the tower, it is connected to the Judicial Wing by a tunnel accessible only to state employees.

=== North Dakota Heritage Center ===
The North Dakota Heritage Center building is home to the Heritage Center museum which stores and displays artifacts from around the state. The building also is home to office space for the North Dakota State Historical Society which operates the museum. Planning for the building began as early as 1963 and upon completion of the structure in 1981, the State Historical Society moved from the Liberty Memorial Building into its new Heritage Center quarters. The facility consists of 130,000 square feet (12,000 m^{2}) and provides exhibit areas as well as storage, meeting rooms, and offices.

In 2006, state officials revealed a massive expansion plan for the center. The construction cost approximately $50 million and nearly doubled the size of the complex adding three large galleries to the east of the existing structure, as well as a new main entry fronting State Street. The building consisted of 140,000 square feet (13,000 m^{2}) and the expansion added 125,000 square feet (11,600 m^{2}). Funding for the project consisted of twenty percent private, twenty percent federal, and sixty percent state. In addition to the new gallery area, the expansion includes a 50-seat digital auditorium, climate-controlled storage areas, a café, a children's gallery, expanded visitors service and store, and the Corridor of History, a 25-foot (7.6 m)-wide walkway spanning the length of the expansion with a glazed southern exposure on one side and digital murals on the other.

=== State Office Building ===
The State Office Building, on the complex's southeast corner, was originally erected in 1955 to house the Bismarck Junior College (now Bismarck State College. The State Legislature authorized the purchase and conversion of the building into state offices in 1961. The building housed the State Water Commission, the Attorney General's Civil Litigation Division, Natural Resources offices, and Bureau of Indian Affairs attorneys. During the 1991-1993 biennium, the building underwent massive renovation and was re-faced with an exterior that blended more harmoniously with the complex's other buildings, despite being the smallest office building on campus at 28,838 square feet (2,679 m^{2}). The building eventually developed persistent mold issues due to an underground stream beneath the building and was razed in late 2023. Work is underway as of late 2025 to erect two buildings on the building's site that will replace the State Historical Society's off-campus storage.

=== North Dakota Governor's Residence ===
Prior to 1960, North Dakota's First Family lived in a house off the capitol grounds. In 1960, the state constructed a residence near 4th Street on the west side of the campus to replace the outdated residence. After an extensive remodeling effort managed by then-first-lady Nancy Schafer in 2000, the residence had more than 10,000 square feet (1,000 m^{2}) of floor space and eighteen rooms. In 2015, the legislature authorized a new residence adjacent to the current facility that would address security and accessibility issues. The state offered the structure to anyone who would relocate it, but received no bids, so it was demolished. The new structure had an anticipated cost of $5 million with a requirement $1 million be raised by private donations. The governor's family occupied the new residence in March 2018.

== Outdoor facilities ==
=== Parks ===
Two parks, the Myron Atkinson Park and the Capitol Park occupy space on the capitol grounds. The Myron Atkinson Park, named after the Bismarck attorney Myron Atkinson, is east of State Street. Pedestrians can access the park via a tunnel. The Capitol Park is at the northwest corner of the grounds at the intersection of 4th Street and Divide Avenue and includes a playground with trees and shrubs planted by the Farwest Rotary Club.

=== Arboretum Trail ===
The Arboretum Trail is a walking trail winding through a wooded area on the west side of the grounds. Walkers pass 60-million-year-old petrified tree stumps from the Amidon, North Dakota, area, as well as 75 different species of trees and shrubs which are labeled with ground plaques. Various statues and memorials are also on the trail. The trail was created in 1985 in anticipation of the state's centennial and as an opportunity for state employees and the public to exercise while learning about various trees and the history of the buildings on the grounds. Many area schools take their students to the trail for nature walks and students have used the various trees for leaf collections. This damaged some of the trees, so signs that forbid leaf picking were posted.

=== Prairie Trail ===
The Prairie Trail runs north of the Capitol's Judicial Wing, taking pedestrians into an area filled with examples of grasses and wild flowers which are typical of native prairie. In 2006, the trail was expanded to take walkers from the corner of State Street and Divide Avenue south into the main grounds area. The original trail was dedicated with a plaque in 1987 and the wild grassland surrounding the trail was registered as a state Natural Area by the Parks and Recreation Department.

== Statues and other features ==
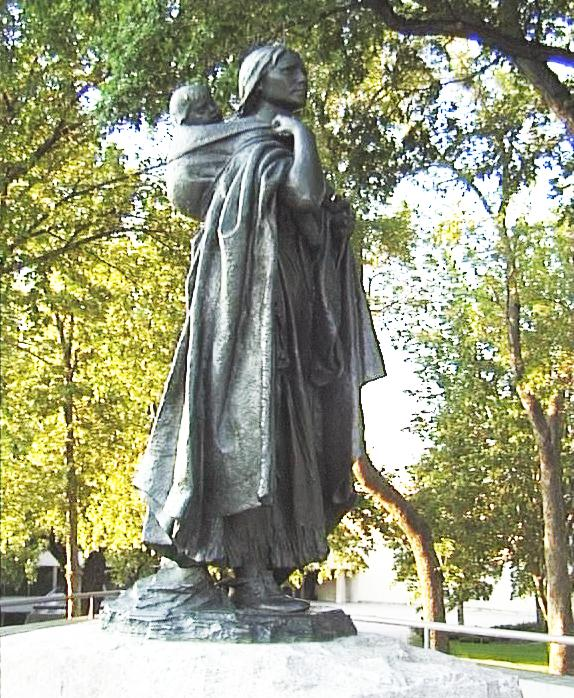
Sakakawea statue by Leonard Crunelle on the grounds of the North Dakota State Capitol

=== Statues ===
Several statues are on the grounds, depicting Sakakawea (1910), a pioneer family (1946), John Burke (1963), a bison (1986), "Pioneers of the Future" (1989), and an Arabian horse (1994).

=== Memorials ===
The grounds have memorials to members of the armed forces from North Dakota who died in the state's first century, police officers who died in the line of duty, and Purple Heart recipients. North Dakota's French Gratitude Train car is also on the grounds, as well as the bowplate of the USS North Dakota.

=== Fossils ===
60-million year old fossilized Metasequoia trees from Amidon, North Dakota were installed on the grounds in 1988.

=== Former landmarks ===
A Mandan earth lodge was once located on the grounds, but it was removed from the grounds due to decay, and a cabin belonging to Teddy Roosevelt was moved to Medora, North Dakota.

== See also ==
- List of North Dakota Legislative Assemblies
- List of tallest buildings by U.S. state
- List of state and territorial capitols in the United States
