= North Dakota Insurance Commissioner =

Insurance Commissioner of North Dakota
- Incumbent; Jon Godfread since 2016
- North Dakota Insurance Department
- Seat: Bismarck, North Dakota
- Term length: Four years
- Constituting instrument: Constitution of North Dakota
- Formation: 1889
- First holder: A.L. Carey
- Website: www.nd.gov/NDIns/

The North Dakota insurance commissioner regulates the insurance industry in North Dakota, United States, licenses insurance professionals in the state, educates consumers about different types of insurance, and handles consumer complaints. The current insurance commissioner is Jon Godfread who was elected in 2016.

== History ==
Since the creation of the office with the state's constitution in 1889, the state has seen a total of 22 insurance commissioners. The commissioners have served relatively short terms when compared with North Dakota's other state offices; the longest tenure was that of Sveinung A. Olsness who served for 18 years, and the average time in office has been about 6 years. The office has been held by the North Dakota Republican Party for a wide majority of its existence; only four of the 22 insurance commissioners were from the state's Democratic Party. The insurance commissioner originally served a two-year term, but this was extended to four in 1964 by a constitutional amendment.

In 2023, the North Dakota state legislature passed a bill sifting the office of the state fire marshal from the supervision of the state attorney general to that of the insurance commissioner.

In 2025, the North Dakota Securities Department was merged into the North Dakota Insurance Department, with the insurance commissioner taking on the additional role of securities commissioner.

== See also ==
- List of North Dakota insurance commissioners
