= 2026 North Dakota Senate election =

- November 3, 2026

24 of 47 Senate seats in the North Dakota Senate (odd-numbered districts).
| | Majority party | Minority party |
|---|---|---|
| Leader | Kyle Davison | Kathy Hogan (retiring) |
| Party | Republican | Democratic–NPL |
| Leader since | April 10, 2025 | January 3, 2023 |
| Leader's seat | 41st district | 21st district |
| Seats before | 42 | 5 |
| Seats after | 41 | 6 |
| Seat change | ▼1 | ▲1 |
- Status of the incumbents: Republican retiring Republican running Democratic-NPL retiring Democratic-NPL running No election
President pro tempore before election
Brad Bekkedahl
Republican
Elected President pro tempore
Brad Bekkedahl
Republican

Elections to the North Dakota Senate were held on November 3, 2026, to elect 24 candidates to serve a four-year term in the 70th and 71st North Dakota Legislative Assemblies. All senators in odd-numbered districts were up for re-election.

These elections took place alongside races for United States House of Representatives, the state house, and numerous other state and local offices.

== Predictions ==
| Source | Ranking | As of |
|---|---|---|
| Sabato's Crystal Ball | Safe R | January 22, 2026 |

== Results ==
=== By district ===
| District | Incumbent | Party | First elected | Result | Candidates |
|---|---|---|---|---|---|
| 1st | Brad Bekkedahl | Republican | 2014 | Incumbent re-elected. | ▌ ✓ Brad Bekkedahl (i) |
| 3rd | Bob Paulson | Republican | | Incumbent re-elected. | ▌ ✓ Bob Paulson (i); ▌ Michael Thiesen |
| 5th | Randy Burckhard | Republican | | Incumbent retired. Republican hold. | ▌ ✓ Jay Fisher |
| 7th | Michelle Axtman | Republican | | Incumbent re-elected. | ▌ ✓ Michelle Axtman (i); ▌ Kevin Horneman |
| 9th | Richard Marcellais | Dem-NPL | | Incumbent lost renomination. Democratic hold. | ▌ ✓ Jayme Davis |
| 11th | Tim Mathern | Dem-NPL | | Incumbent re-elected. | ▌ ✓ Tim Mathern (i); ▌ Christine O'Riley |
| 13th | Judy Lee | Rep | | Incumbent re-elected. | ▌ ✓ Judy Lee (i); ▌ Landis Larson |
| 15th | Kent Weston | Rep | | Incumbent lost renomination. Republican hold. | ▌ ✓ Kristin Kenner |
| 17th | Jonathan Sickler | Rep | | Incumbent re-elected. | ▌ Katie Benton; ▌ ✓ Jonathan Sickler (i) |
| 19th | Janne Myrdal | Rep | | Incumbent re-elected. | ▌ Jefferey E. Hermanson; ▌ ✓ Janne Myrdal (i) |
| 21st | Kathy Hogan | Dem-NPL | | Incumbent retiring. Democratic-NPL hold. | ▌ ✓ Mary Schneider |
| 23rd | Todd Beard | Rep | | Incumbent re-elected. | ▌ ✓ Todd Beard (i) |
| 25th | Larry Luick | Rep | | Incumbent re-elected. | ▌ Bob Heitkamp; ▌ ✓ Larry Luick (i) |
| 27th | Kristin Roers | Rep | | Incumbent re-elected. | ▌ ✓ Kristin Roers (i) |
| 29th | Terry Wanzek | Rep | | Incumbent re-elected. | ▌ ✓ Terry Wanzek (i); ▌ John Kelly |
| 31st | Donald Schaible | Rep | | Incumbent re-elected. | ▌ ✓ Donald Schaible (i); ▌ Kelly Spilman |
| 33rd | Keith Boehm | Rep | | Incumbent re-elected. | ▌ ✓ Keith Boehm (i); ▌ Signe Snortland |
| 35th | Sean D. Cleary | Rep | | Incumbent re-elected. | ▌ ✓ Sean D. Cleary (i); ▌ Dale Pittman |
| 37th | Dean Rummel | Rep | | Incumbent re-elected. | ▌ ✓ Dean Rummel (i) |
| 39th | Greg Kessel | Rep | | Incumbent re-elected. | ▌ ✓ Greg Kessel (i) |
| 41st | Kyle Davison | Rep | | Incumbent re-elected. | ▌ ✓ Kyle Davison (i); ▌ Nyamal Dei |
| 43rd | Jeff Barta | Rep | | Incumbent lost re-election. Democratic-NPL gain. | ▌ ✓ Mary K. Adams; ▌ Jeff Barta (i) |
| 45th | Ronald Sorvaag | Rep | | Incumbent re-elected. | ▌ Dan Mitchell; ▌ ✓ Ronald Sorvaag (i) |
| 47th | Michael Dwyer | Rep | | Incumbent re-elected. | ▌ ✓ Michael Dwyer (i); ▌ Bill Patrie |

== Partisan background ==
In the 2024 U.S. presidential election, Republican Donald Trump won the most votes in 42 of North Dakota's state senate districts and Democratic—NPL nominee Kamala Harris won 5. Out of the 24 odd-numbered districts up for election in 2026, Trump won the most votes in twenty-one, and Harris won the most votes in three. There are no crossover districts, meaning no district is represented by a legislator of a different party than the presidential candidate who won the most votes there.

Harris (D-NPL) 40–50% 50–60% / Trump (R) 50–60% 60–70% 70–80% 80–90%

== District 1 ==
The 1st district is represented by Republican Brad Bekkedahl, who is running for re-election.

=== Republican primary ===
==== Nominee ====
- Brad Bekkedahl, incumbent senator

== District 3 ==
The 3rd district is represented by Republican Bob Paulson, who is running for re-election.

=== Republican primary ===
==== Nominee ====
- Bob Paulson, incumbent senator

=== Democratic–NPL primary ===
==== Nominee ====
- Michael Thiesen

== District 5 ==
The 5th district is represented by Republican Randy Burckhard, who declined to run for re-election.

=== Republican primary ===
==== Nominee ====
- Jay Fisher, state representative from this district (2018–present)

==== Declined ====
- Randy Burckhard, incumbent senator

== District 7 ==
The 7th district is represented by Republican Michelle Axtman, who is running for re-election.

=== Republican primary ===
==== Nominee ====
- Michelle Axtman, incumbent senator

==== Eliminated in primary ====
- Jerri Hopfauf, district Republican committee chairwoman

==== Endorsements ====
Jerri Hopfauf

Political parties

- District 7 Republican committee

=== Democratic–NPL primary ===
==== Nominee ====
- Kevin Horneman

== District 9 ==
The 9th district is represented by Democrat Richard Marcellais, who is running for re-election.

=== Democratic–NPL primary ===
==== Nominee ====
- Jayme Davis, state representative from this district (2022–present)

==== Eliminated in primary ====
- Richard Marcellais, incumbent senator

==== Endorsements ====
Richard Marcellais

Political parties

- District 9 Democratic–NPL committee

== District 11 ==
The 11th district is represented by Democrat Tim Mathern, who is running for re-election.

=== Democratic–NPL primary ===
==== Nominee ====
- Tim Mathern, incumbent senator

=== Republican primary ===
==== Nominee ====
- Christine O'Riley, psychologist

== District 13 ==
The 13th district is represented by Republican Judy Lee, who is running for re-election. She defeated right-wing populist Phillip Sallberg in the Republican primary.

=== Republican primary ===
==== Nominee ====
- Judy Lee, incumbent senator

==== Eliminated in primary ====
- Philip Sallberg

==== Endorsements ====
Philip Sallberg

Political parties

- District 13 Republican committee

=== Democratic–NPL primary ===
==== Nominee ====
- Landis Larson

== District 15 ==
The 15th district is represented by Republican Kent Weston, who is running for re-election.

=== Republican primary ===
==== Nominee ====
- Kristin Kenner

==== Eliminated in primary ====
- Kent Weston, incumbent senator
- Judy Estenson, former senator from this district (2022–2025)

== District 17 ==
The 17th district is represented by Republican Jonathan Sickler, who is running for re-election.

=== Republican primary ===
==== Nominee ====
- Jonathan Sickler, incumbent senator

=== Democratic–NPL primary ===
==== Nominee ====
- Katie Benton

==== Endorsements ====
Katie Benton

Political parties

- North Dakota Democratic–Nonpartisan League Party

== District 19 ==
The 19th district is represented by Republican Janne Myrdal, who is running for re-election.

=== Republican primary ===
==== Nominee ====
- Janne Myrdal, incumbent senator

=== Democratic–NPL primary ===
==== Nominee ====
- Jeff Hermanson

==== Endorsements ====
Jeff Hermanson

Political parties

- North Dakota Democratic–Nonpartisan League Party

== District 21 ==
The 21st district is represented by Democrat Kathy Hogan, who is not running for re-election.

=== Democratic–NPL primary ===
==== Nominee ====
- Mary Schneider, state representative from this district (2014–present)

==== Declined ====
- Kathy Hogan, incumbent senator

== District 23 ==
The 23rd district is represented by Republican Todd Beard, who is running for re-election.

=== Republican primary ===
==== Nominee ====
- Todd Beard, incumbent senator

==== Endorsements ====
Todd Beard

Political parties

- District 23 Republican committee

== District 25 ==
The 25th district is represented by Republican Larry Luick, who is running for re-election.

=== Republican primary ===
==== Nominee ====
- Larry Luick, incumbent senator

=== Democratic–NPL primary ===
==== Nominee ====
- Bob Heitkamp

== District 27 ==
The 27th district is represented by Republican Kristin Roers, who is running for re-election.

=== Republican primary ===
==== Nominee ====
- Kristin Roers, incumbent senator

== District 29 ==
The 29th district is represented by Republican Terry Wanzek, who is running for re-election.

=== Republican primary ===
==== Nominee ====
- Terry Wanzek, incumbent senator

=== Democratic–NPL primary ===
==== Nominee ====
- John Kelly

== District 31 ==
The 31st district is represented by Republican Donald Schaible, who is running for re-election.

=== Republican primary ===
==== Nominee ====
- Donald Schaible, incumbent senator

==== Eliminated in primary ====
- Mary Graner

=== Democratic–NPL primary ===
==== Nominee ====
- Kelly Spilman

== District 33 ==
The 33rd district is represented by Republican Keith Boehm, who is running for re-election.

=== Republican primary ===
==== Nominee ====
- Keith Boehm, incumbent senator

=== Democratic–NPL primary ===
==== Nominee ====
- Signe Snortland

== District 35 ==
The 35th district is represented by Republican Sean D. Cleary, who is running for re-election.

=== Republican primary ===
==== Nominee ====
- Sean D. Cleary, incumbent senator

=== Democratic–NPL primary ===
==== Nominee ====
- Dale Pittman

== District 37 ==
The 37th district is represented by Republican Dean Rummel, who is running for re-election.

=== Republican primary ===
==== Nominee ====
- Dean Rummel, incumbent senator

== District 39 ==
The 39th district is represented by Republican Greg Kessel, who is running for re-election.

=== Republican primary ===
==== Nominee ====
- Greg Kessel, incumbent senator

== District 41 ==
The 41st district is represented by Republican Kyle Davison, who is running for re-election.

=== Republican primary ===
==== Nominee ====
- Kyle Davison, incumbent senator

=== Democratic–NPL primary ===
==== Nominee ====
- Nyamal Dei

== District 43 ==
The 43rd district is represented by Republican Jeff Barta, who is running for re-election.

=== Republican primary ===
==== Nominee ====
- Jeff Barta, incumbent senator

=== Democratic–NPL primary ===
==== Nominee ====
- Mary K. Adams

== District 45 ==
The 45th district is represented by Republican Ronald Sorvaag, who is running for re-election.

=== Republican primary ===
==== Nominee ====
- Ronald Sorvaag, incumbent senator

=== Democratic–NPL primary ===
==== Nominee ====
- Dan Mitchell

== District 47 ==
The 47th district is represented by Republican Michael Dwyer, who is eligible to run for re-election but has not yet stated if he will do so.

=== Republican primary ===
==== Nominee ====
- Michael Dwyer, incumbent senator

=== Democratic–NPL primary ===
==== Nominee ====
- Bill Patrie
