= Lyson =

Lyson may refer to:

- Lyson (Λύσων), an ancient Greek statuary. His statue of the Athenian people in the senate-house of the Five Hundred is mentioned by Pausanias
- Stanley W. Lyson (1936), Republican member of the North Dakota Senate
- Thomas A. Lyson (1948–2006), Sociologist at Cornell University and proponent of Civic agriculture
- Tyler Lyson, American palaeontologist

== See also ==
- Lysons
