= Senator Beard =

Senator Beard may refer to:

- Edna Beard (1877–1928), Vermont State Senate
- John Beard (politician) (1797–1876), North Carolina State Senate
- John William Beard (1920–2006), California State Senate
- Malcolm Beard (Florida politician) (1919–2019), Florida State Senate
- Todd Beard (fl. 2020s), North Dakota State Senate
