= Allan Stenehjem =

American politician

Member of the North Dakota House of Representatives from the 25th district
- In office December 1, 1992 – December 1, 1998
- Succeeded by: Myron Koppang; Bruce Eckre
- In office December 1, 1988 – December 1, 1990

Personal details
- Party: Republican

Allan Stenehjem is an American politician who served in the North Dakota House of Representatives from the 25th district from 1988 to 1990 and from 1992 to 1998.
