= Dakota (fossil) =

Fossil Edmontosaurus annectens

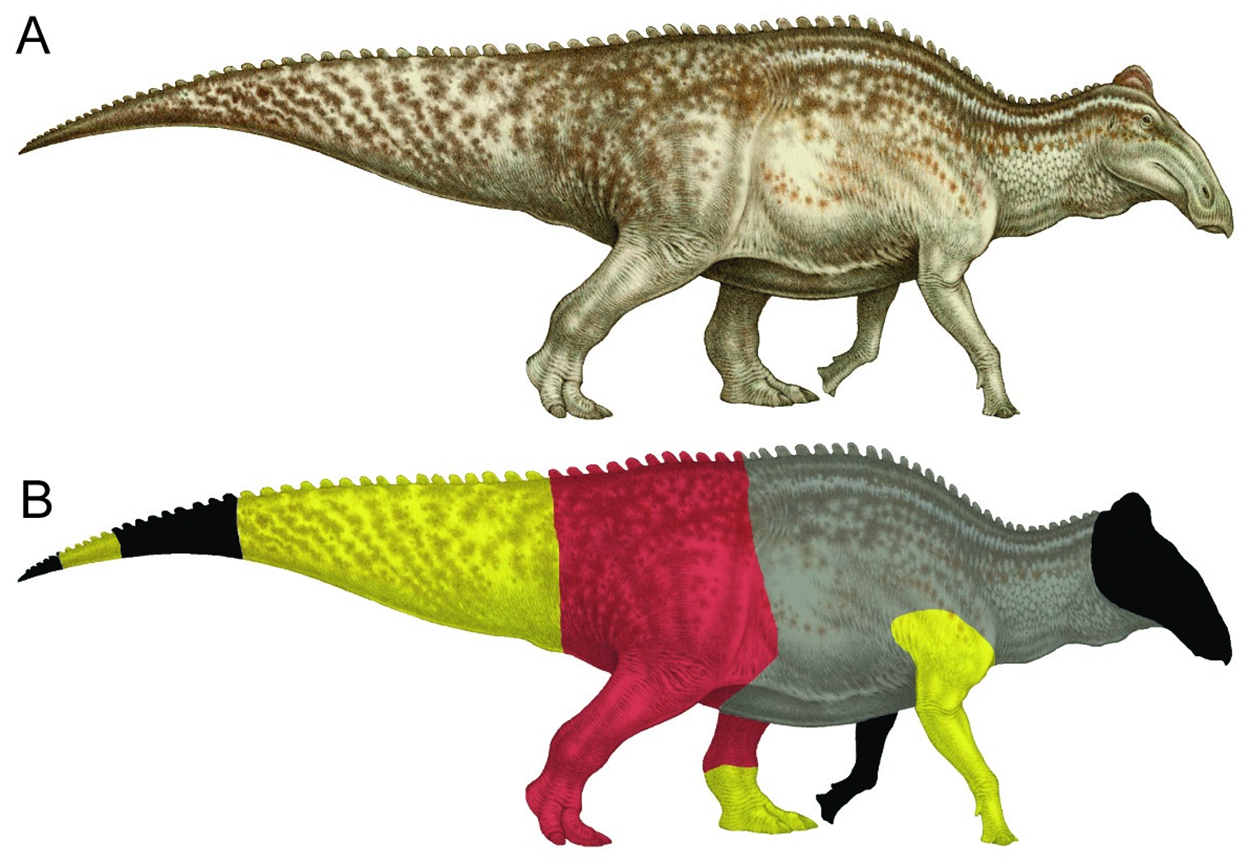
Life restoration and diagram of Dakota, featuring the known soft tissue areas (red and yellow) of the specimen as of 2022

Dakota (specimen NDGS 2000) is an exceptionally well-preserved dinosaur fossil assigned to Edmontosaurus. A dinosaur mummy, the specimen preserves soft tissues including extensive patches of skin, spikes along the midline of the tail, and the hooves of the forefeet. Biomarkers were detected in the skin, suggesting that breakdown products of organic molecules are also preserved. Both the bones and the skin show signs of scavenging by at least two larger carnivores. The carcass would have lain on the surface for weeks or months, drying out, before being buried in river sands. The specimen was discovered in 1999 in rocks of the Hell Creek Formation in North Dakota, US, and is about 66 million years old, from the very end of the Late Cretaceous period.

== Discovery and classification ==
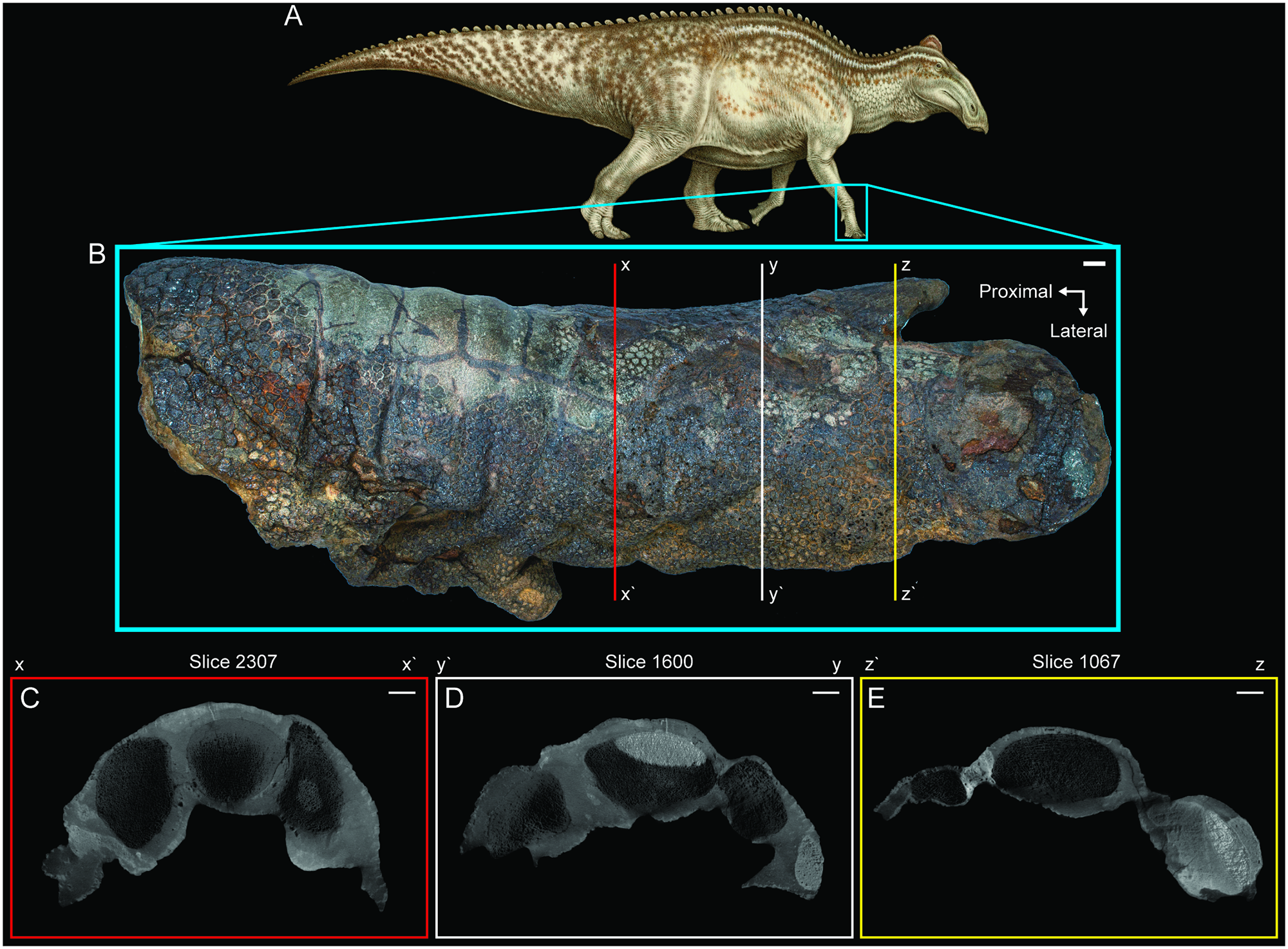
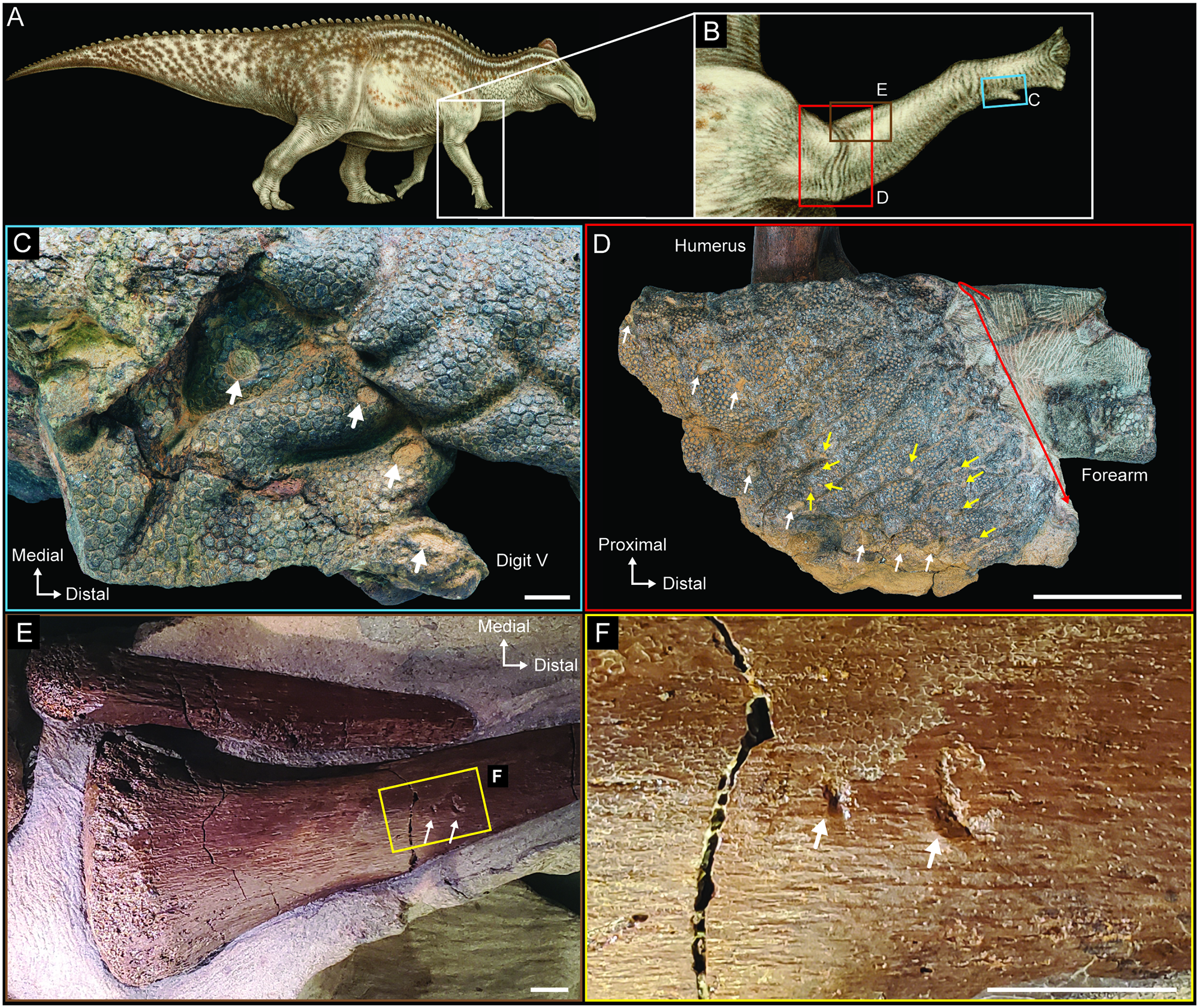
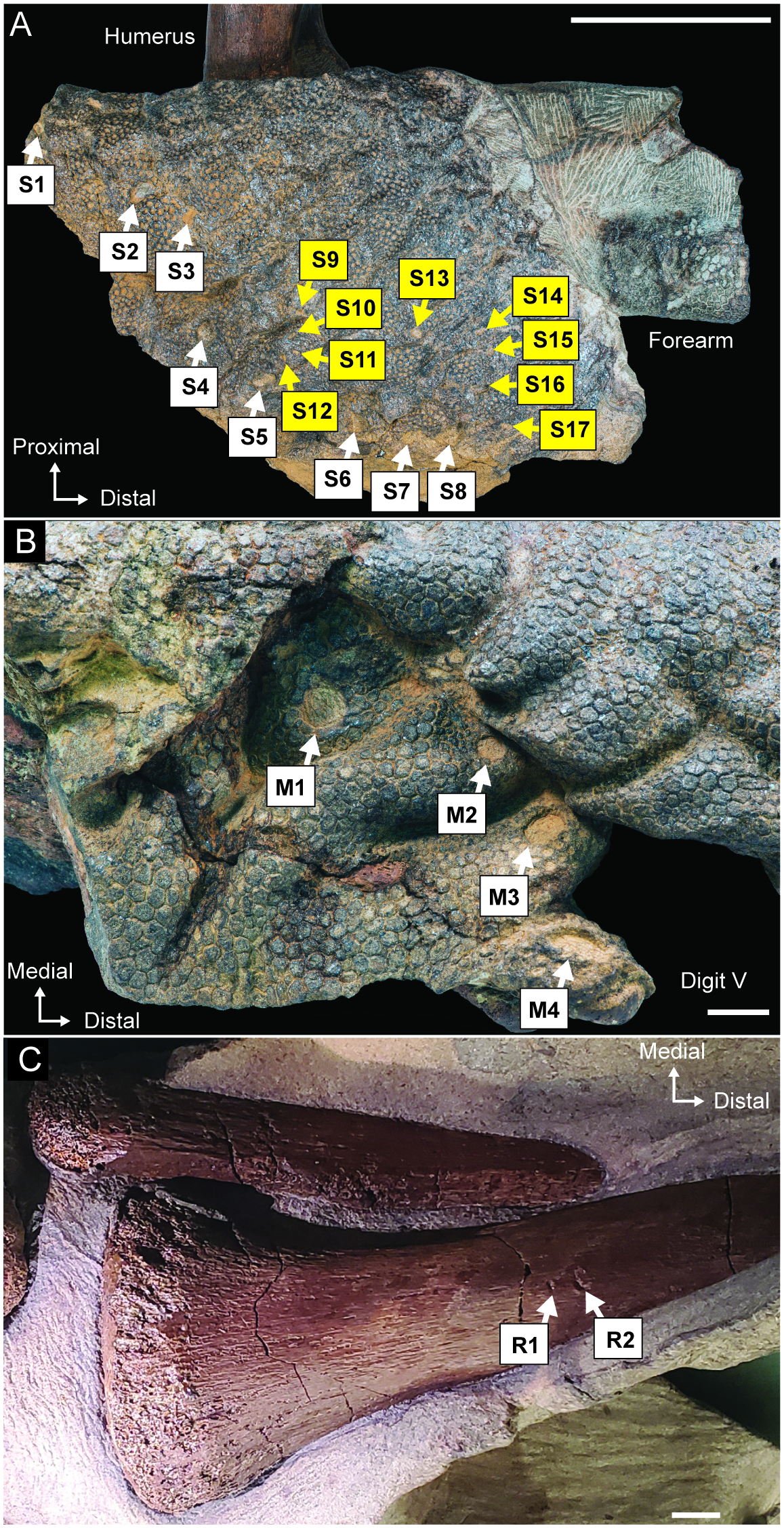
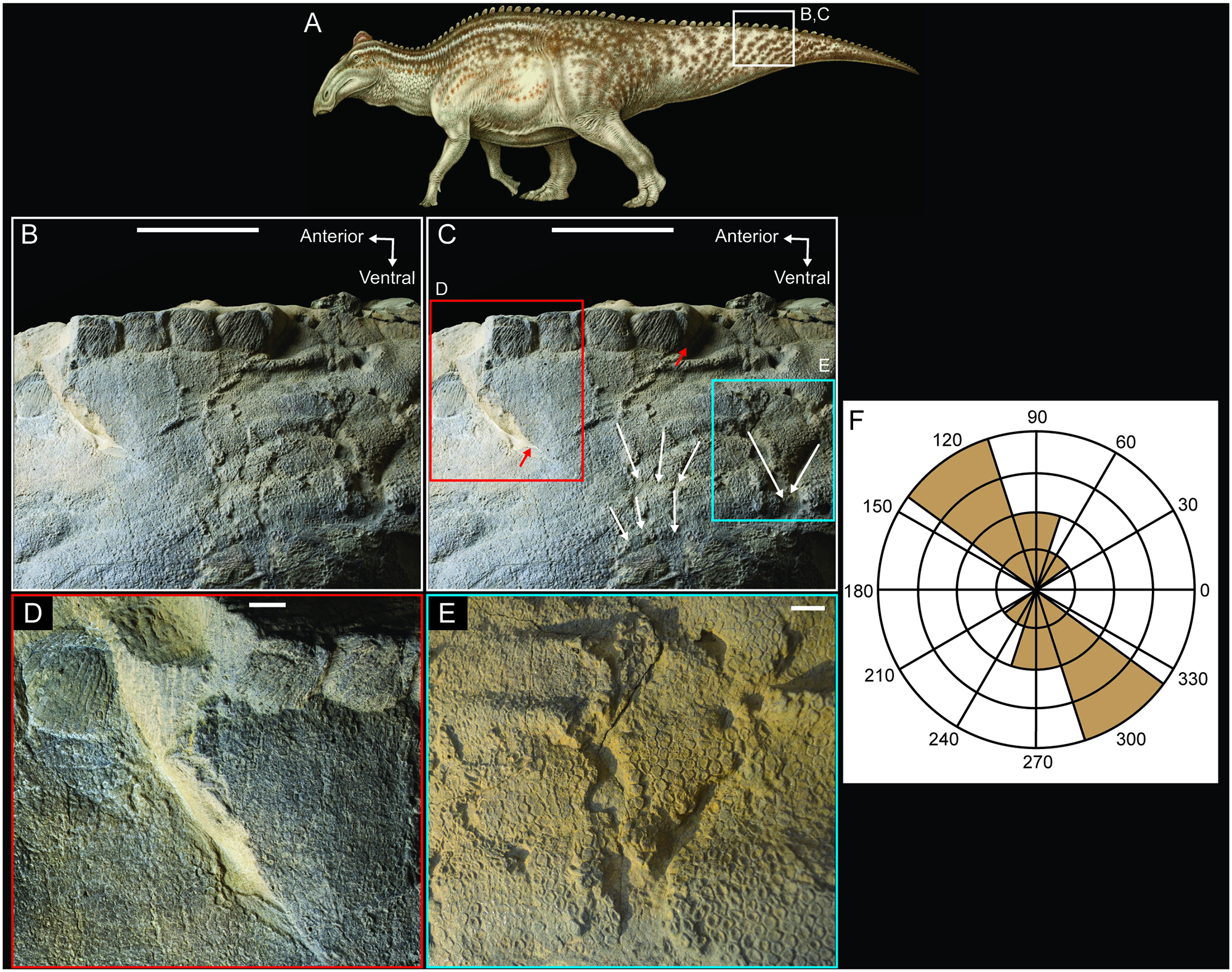
Detailed and labelled photographs of the preserved soft tissue of Dakota

Dakota was first discovered by paleontology student Tyler Lyson on his family's North Dakota property in 1999 while he was a high school student, but he did not investigate the site in detail until 2004, when he discovered the soft tissue preservation. Lyson teamed with British paleontologist Phillip Manning, and the site was excavated in summer 2006.

The specimen was discovered northwest of Marmarth, North Dakota, in a sandstone layer that is 6 m (20 ft) in thickness and had been deposited in a large point bar of a river. These sedimentary rocks are part of the Hell Creek Formation. The specimen is about 66 million years old, from the very end of the Late Cretaceous period.

The specimen was previously housed at the Marmarth Research Foundation (MRF) under the catalog number MRF-3. In 2016, the State of North Dakota became the owner, and the specimen is now permanently part of the collection of the North Dakota Geological Survey under the specimen number NDGS 2000. As of 2022, preparation of the specimen has not yet been completed.

Initially, Dakota has been assigned to an undetermined species of Edmontosaurus (Edmontosaurus sp.). In 2025, Paul Sereno and colleagues listed it as Edmontosaurus cf. annectens, meaning that it compares well with the species Edmontosaurus annectens but cannot be assigned to it with certainty.

== Description and presence of organic compounds ==
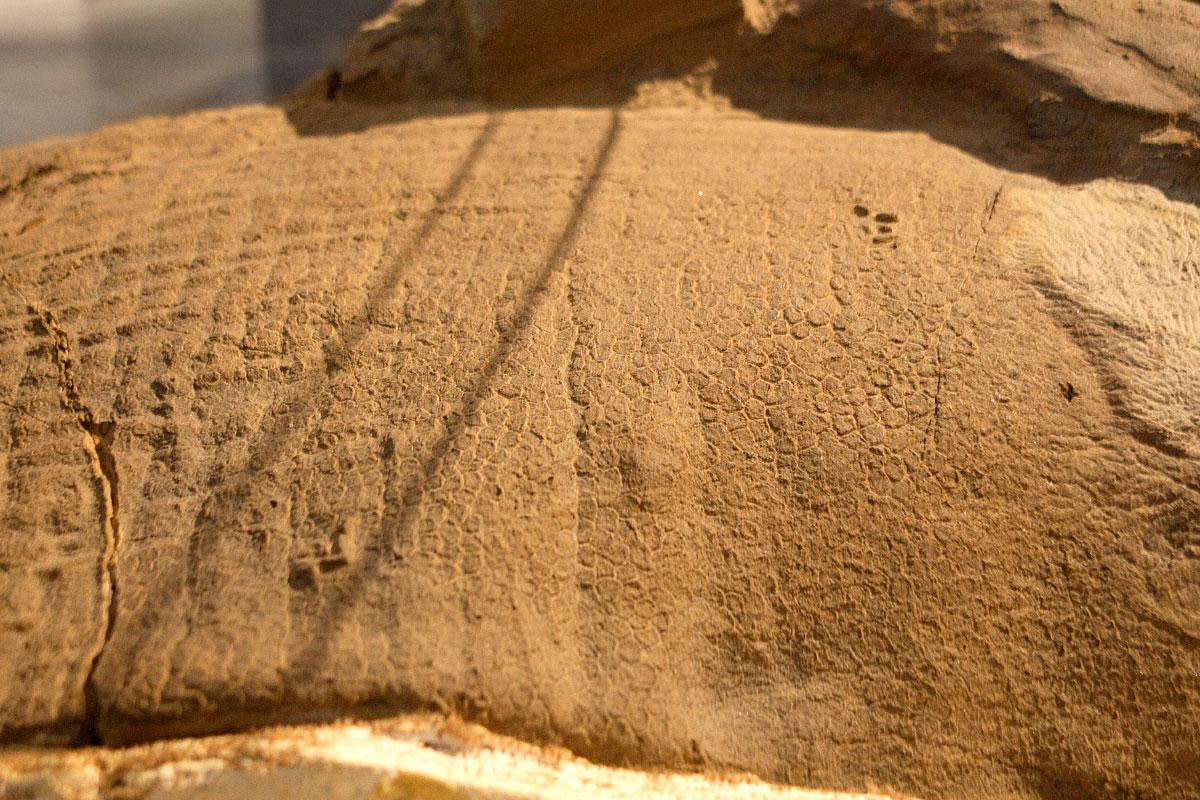
Preserved skin patch

The skeleton lacks the skull, the left forelimb, and the end of the tail. Preserved soft tissues include extensive patches of skin, the horny sheets of the hooves, as well as a row of spikes running down the tail. Soft tissues are probably preserved thanks to rapid mineralization, preserving their shape even after their decay. In a 2009 study, Manning and colleagues stated that this mineralization even preserved microstructures such as cell boundaries. In addition, these researchers detected amide groups in the skin, which they interpreted as the decay products of organic molecules. Intact proteins and internal organs such as muscles or viscera are not preserved.

In a 2015 follow-up study, Manning and colleagues reported the presence of melanin pigments. Although clarifying that a reconstruction of the coloration is currently not possible given the many different factors that influence coloration, the authors remarked that the melanin distribution may potentially allow for deriving a monochrome (black-and-white) picture of the animal's pigmentation pattern. These authors also argued that the skin of dinosaur mummies is not preserved as an impression, but as a layer that is several millimeters in thickness and contains organic material derived from the original skin tissue. In their 2025 study, Sereno and colleagues found no evidence of organic compounds in the skin of two new mummies from the Lance Formation, and suggested that the same is likely the case in other mummies from the formation such as the AMNH and Senckenberg mummies. In these cases, the skin is a thin layer of clay coating a biofilm (bacterial layer) that formed around the body, recording the external texture of the skin and other soft tissues before they decayed.

== Taphonomy ==
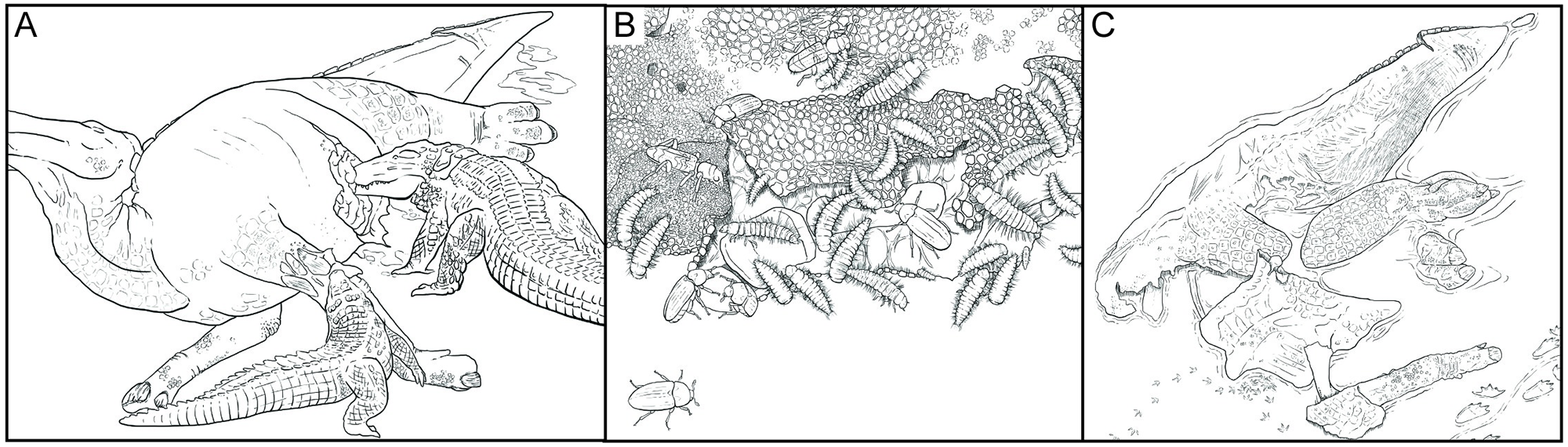
Proposed preservational scenario for Dakota

In 2022, Stephanie K. Drumheller and colleagues identified bite marks on the bones and puncture marks in the preserved skin that show no signs of healing, and indicating that at least two different large scavengers fed on the carcass. The carcass would have lain around for weeks or months before it was buried. Scavenging might have allowed gases and fluids to escape from the carcass, contributing to its desiccation that is indicated by the close attachment of the skin to the bones. Therefore, Drumheller and colleages suggested that scavenging contributed to the high degree of preservation.

== Paleoenvironment ==
The individual inhabited a coastal plain, probably a delta or estuary. In 2013, Vivi Vajda and colleagues analyzed microscopic plant remains from the sandstones that surrounded the mummy. These analyses suggest a forested habitat with a canopy of pines, Taxodium, and cycads, and an understory of ferns and angiosperms. The presence of charcoal indicates frequent wildfires.
