= Mystic Theatre (Marmarth, North Dakota) =

Historic theatre in North Dakota, United States

- U.S. National Register of Historic Places
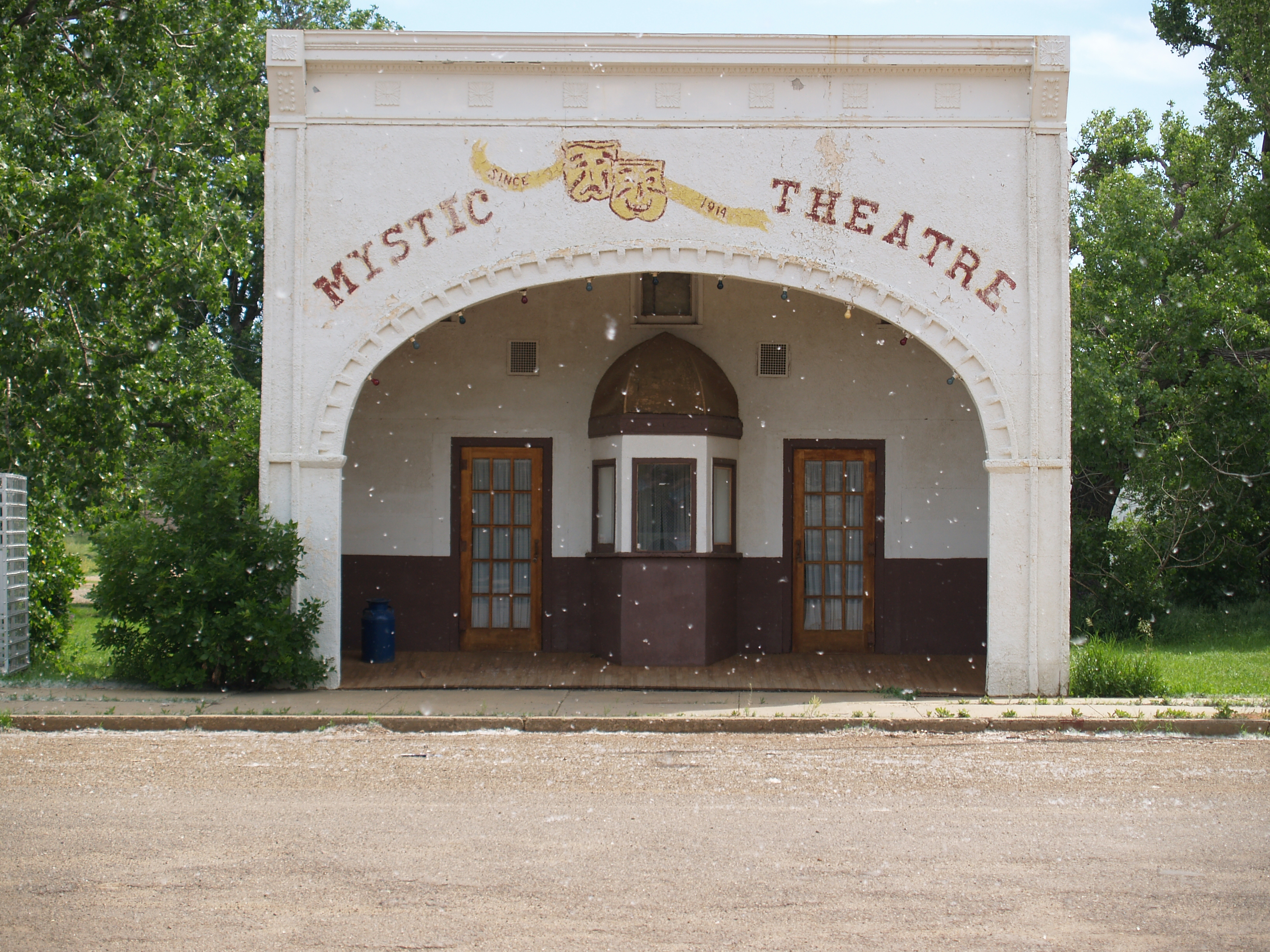

- Location within North Dakota Location within the United States
- Location: Main St., Marmarth, North Dakota
- Coordinates: 46°17′49″N 103°55′29″W
- Built: 1914
- NRHP reference No.: 77001029
- Added to NRHP: September 13, 1977

Mystic Theatre is a historic theatre in Marmarth in Slope County, North Dakota. It was built in 1914 and has also been known as Marmarth Theatre. The theatre was listed on the National Register of Historic Places in 1977.

It is a 26-by-76-foot (7.9 m × 23.2 m) frame building, stuccoed, with 187 seats.

It was unusual for its time, as it was specifically designed for showing "motion pictures". It was a project of professional baseball player Guy Johnson (1891-1971), who moved to Marmarth and built the theatre in 1914. It opened April 22, 1914 and was packed.
