= Lysons =

Lysons is a surname, and may refer to:

- Daniel Lysons (antiquarian), (1762–1834) English antiquary and topographer, brother of Samuel
- Daniel Lysons (British Army officer), (1816–1898) British Army general
- Henry Lysons (1858–1907) British Colonel and recipient of the Victoria Cross
- Samuel Lysons, (1763–1819) English engraver and antiquary, brother of Daniel
- Canon Samuel Lysons, (1806–1877) antiquarian, son of Daniel, proponent of British Israelism
- Tom Lysons, (1934–1997) provincial level politician from Alberta, Canada

== See also ==
- Lyson
