= Bruce Eckre =

American politician

Member of the North Dakota House of Representatives from the 25th district
- In office December 1, 1998 – October 1, 2003
- Preceded by: LeRoy Hausauer; Allan Stenehjem
- Succeeded by: Arden Anderson

Personal details
- Party: Democratic

Bruce Eckre is an American politician who served in the North Dakota House of Representatives from the 25th district from 1998 to 2003.
