= Arden Anderson =

American politician

Member of the North Dakota Senate from the 25th district
- In office December 1, 2006 – December 1, 2010
- Preceded by: Russell T. Thane
- Succeeded by: Larry Luick

Member of the North Dakota House of Representatives from the 25th district
- In office 2003 – December 1, 2004
- Preceded by: Bruce Eckre
- Succeeded by: John Wall

Personal details
- Born: September 3, 1942 Veblen, South Dakota
- Died: May 16, 2012 (aged 69) Fargo, North Dakota
- Party: Democratic

Arden Anderson (September 3, 1942 – May 16, 2012) was an American politician who served in the North Dakota House of Representatives from the 25th district from 2003 to 2004 and in the North Dakota Senate from the 25th district from 2006 to 2010.

He died on May 16, 2012, in Fargo, North Dakota at age 69.
