= Marmarth, North Dakota =

Marmarth
- City
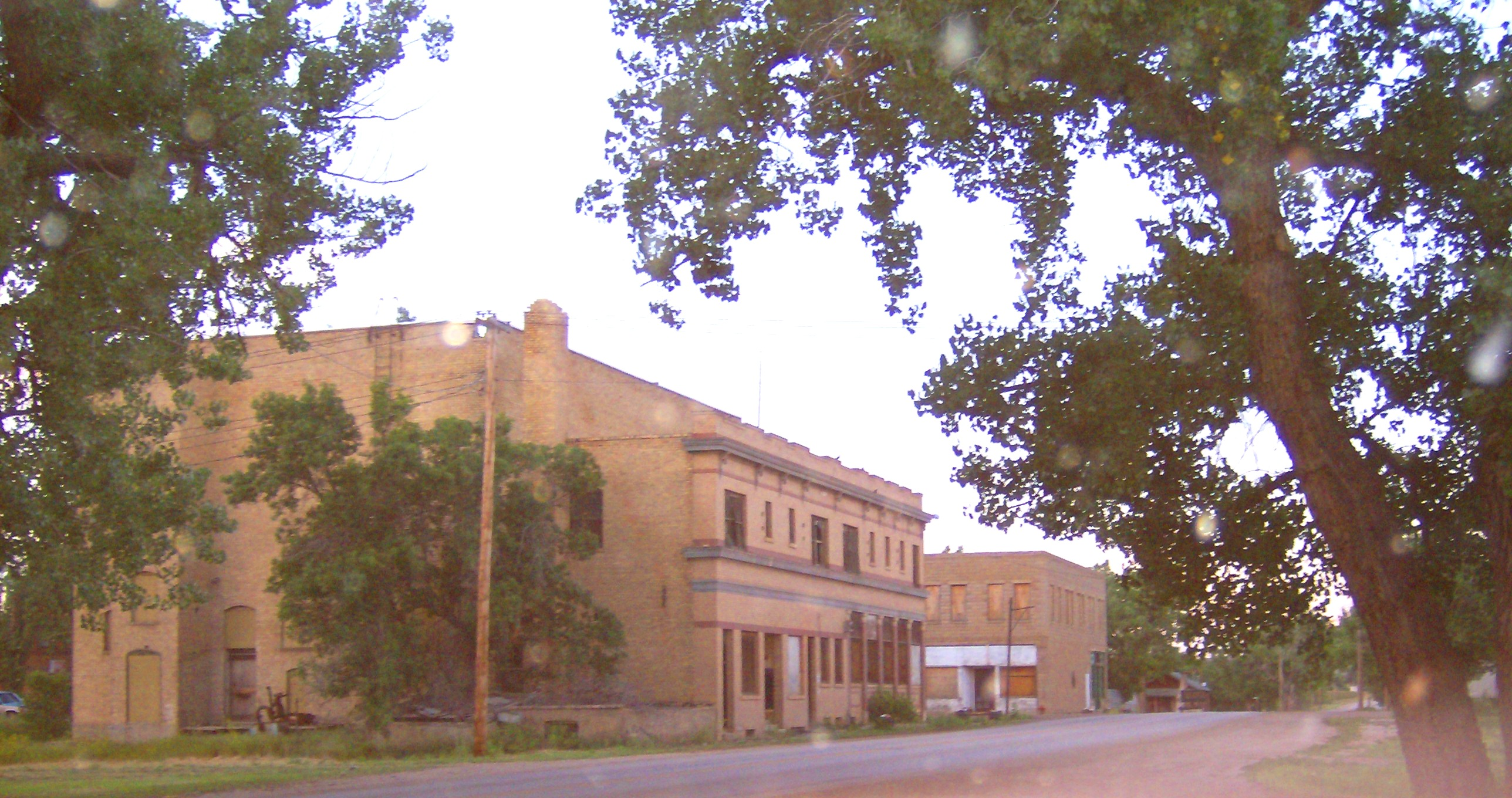
- U.S. Route 12 in Marmarth, 2007.

- Location of Marmarth, North Dakota 58643
- Coordinates: 46°17′45″N 103°55′59″W
- Country: United States
- State: North Dakota
- County: Slope
- Founded: 1907

Area
  - Total: 2.61 sq mi (6.75 km^{2})
  - Land: 2.58 sq mi (6.68 km^{2})
  - Water: 0.027 sq mi (0.07 km^{2})
- Elevation: 2,710 ft (826 m)

Population (2020)
  - Total: 101
  - Estimate (2022): 97
  - Density: 39.2/sq mi (15.13/km^{2})
- Time zone: UTC-7 (Mountain (MST))
  - Summer (DST): UTC-6 (MDT)
- ZIP code: 58643
- Area code: 701
- FIPS code: 38-50860
- GNIS feature ID: 1036151
- Website: www.marmarth.org

Marmarth (/ˈmɑːrməθ/ MAR-məth) is the largest city in Slope County in the U.S. State of North Dakota with a population of 101 as of 2020 census. It is situated in the southwestern part of Slope County, along the Bowman County line in the southwestern part of North Dakota, just seven miles east of the Montana border. Marmarth was founded as a railroad town along the Milwaukee Road from Seattle, WA to Chicago, IL. By 1920, Marmarth had over 1,300 residents. The town's population declined during most of the 20th century and was only 101 in 2021. There is one restaurant and one bar still located in Marmarth in 2013.

The town is recognized for various historical events, including Native-American Lakota history, the discovery of the Dakota fossil and various other dinosaur skeletons, the attack on James L. Fisk by Sitting Bull, and several visits by former president Theodore Roosevelt. Roosevelt visited Marmarth on several occasions and killed both his first buffalo and his first grizzly bear by the Little Missouri River in Marmarth. The old ranch house on Hay Creek in which Roosevelt stayed during his visits is still standing. Another visited attraction in town is the “Woman in Stone”, which is a 50-foot rock depicting the face and hairline of a woman.

The town is located 50 air miles and nearly 100 road miles from Theodore Roosevelt National Park. Marmarth is adjacent to the Little Missouri National Grassland, and is also the closest city to Big Gumbo, a 20,000 acre federally owned public wilderness area administrated by the Bureau of Land Management.

Several movies and TV shows have been filmed in the Theodore Roosevelt National Park, including the Wooly Boys, History Hogs and The Indomitable Teddy Roosevelt, all which were filmed in neighboring Billings County.

== Etymology ==
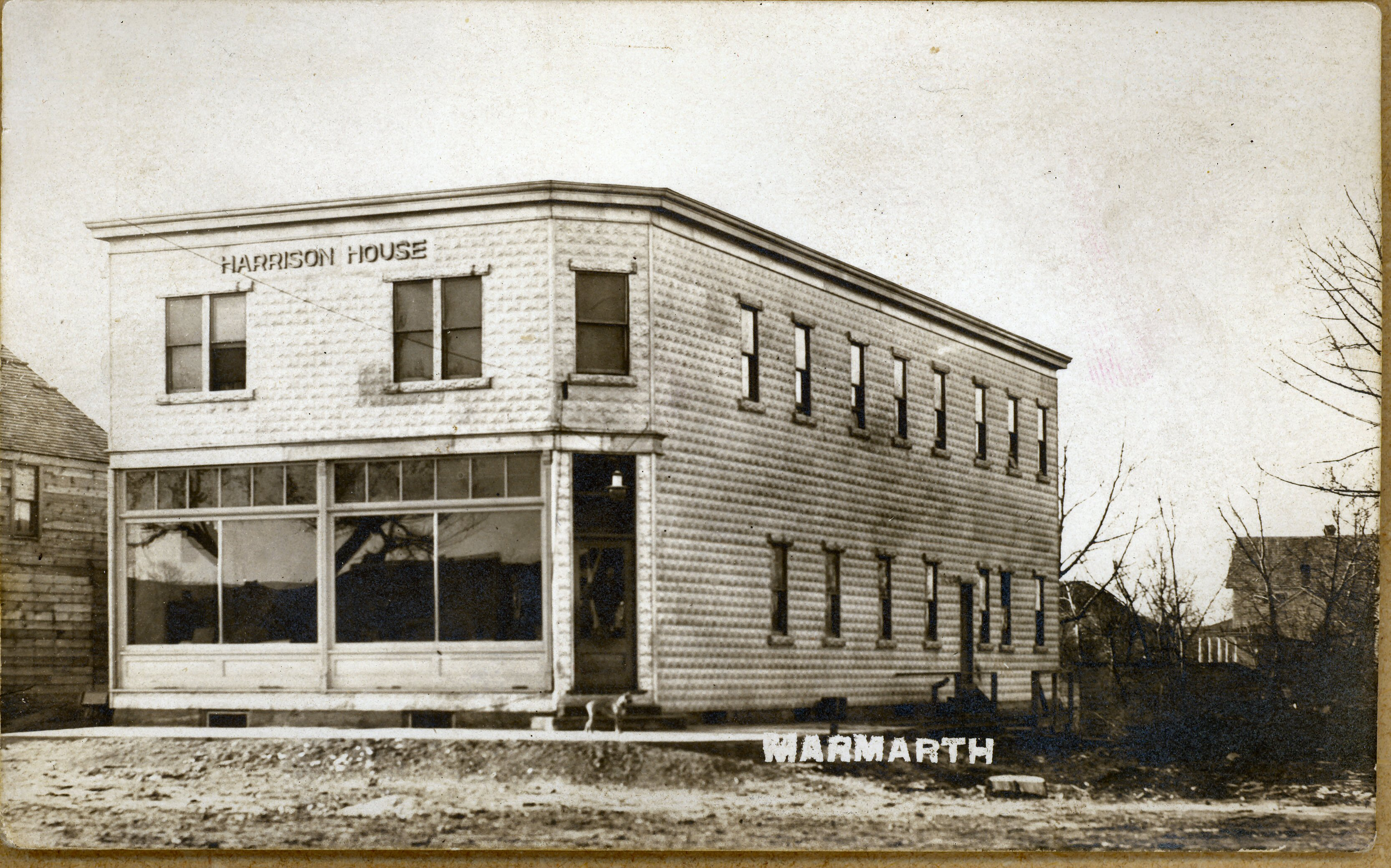
The Harrison House in Marmarth, 1915.

The name comes from a combination of letters in the first and middle names of Margaret Martha Finch, granddaughter of Albert J. Earling, president of the railroad at the time. It is nicknamed the “city of trees”, as a result of being one of few forested areas in the Badlands region of Southern North Dakota.

== Geography ==
It is located between Bucklin township and Hughes township in the badlands region of North Dakota. It is situated adjacent to the Little Missouri River at the confluence of Little Missouri River, Hay Creek, and Little Beaver Creek. It has an elevation of 2,709 feet (826 m) and is nicknamed “the city of trees” for being an oasis of trees in the treeless Badlands region, and is the only place in the State of North Dakota where limber pines grow.

Marmarth is located at 46°17′41″N 103°55′23″W (46.294693, −103.923037). According to the United States Census Bureau, the town has a total area of 2.52 square miles (6.53 km^{2}), of which 2.50 square miles (6.47 km^{2}) is land and 0.02 square miles (0.05 km^{2}) is water.

=== Climate ===
According to the Köppen Climate Classification system, Marmarth has a semi-arid climate, abbreviated "BSk" on climate maps.

== History ==
=== Native American history ===
The area was originally inhabited by the Lakota- and Crow peoples, which may have been part of the 9th–12th centuries BCE Mound Builders civilization.

On September 2, 1864, Captain James L. Fisk of the Union Army was leading 200 gold-seekers in eighty-eight wagons from North Dakota to Montana. By the Deep Creek, approximately twelve miles east of today's Marmarth, the group was attacked by over a hundred Hunkpapa Sioux Indians led by the chief Sitting Bull. Sitting Bull was wounded, but saved by Jumping Bull and White Bull, while six Hunkpapas, ten soldiers, and two civilians were killed in the battle. The Site of Fort Dilts has been listed on the National Register of Historic Places since 1980.

=== Theodore Roosevelt ===
Theodore Roosevelt was frequently in Marmarth and it is credited as the place where the future president shot his first grizzly bear and also his first buffalo. The old squat ranch house by Hay Creek where the president guested is still standing.

=== Homesteading ===
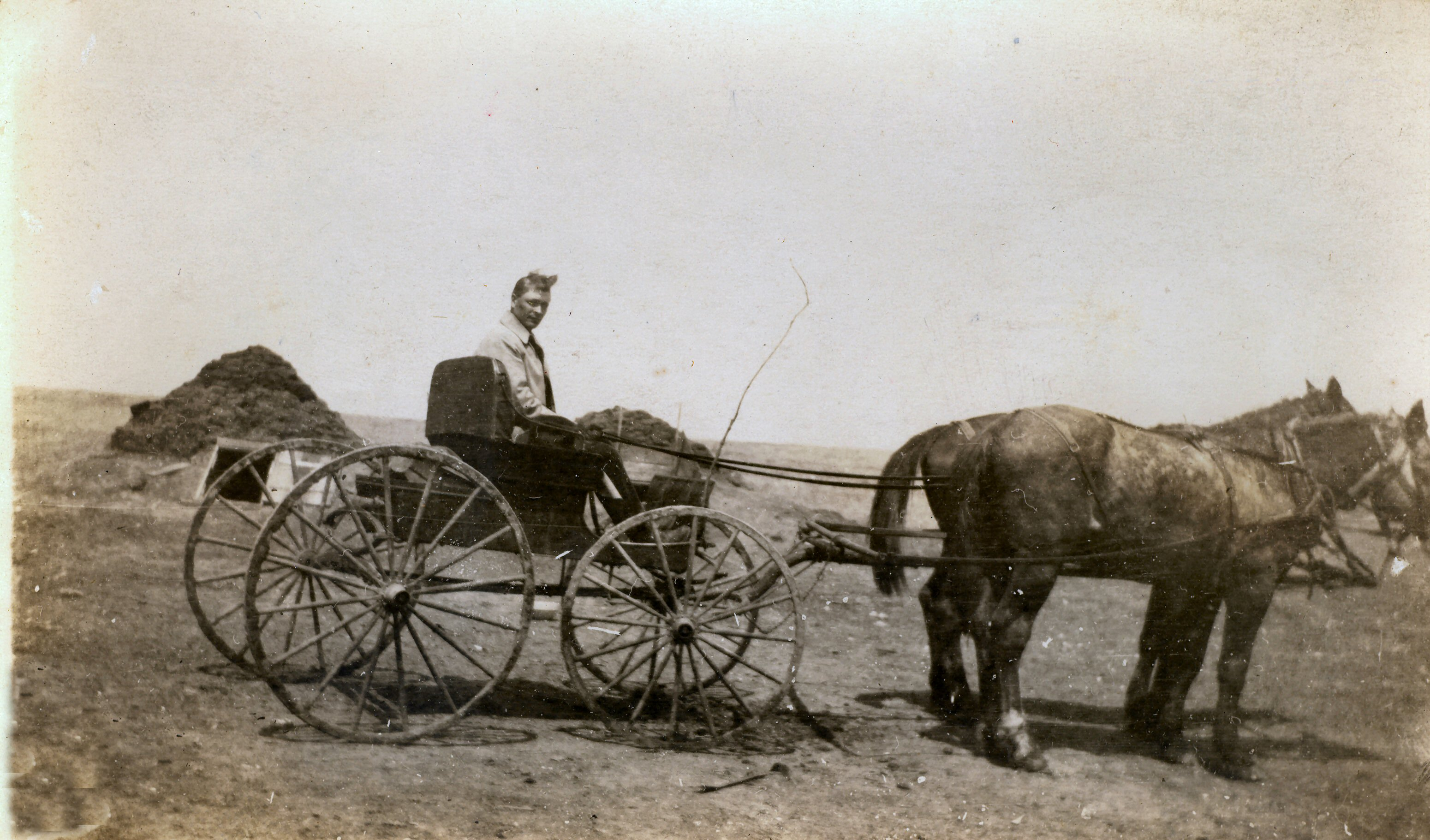
Homesteader Michael Zeis arrives at Marmarth in 1913.

Marmarth was a hugely popular place for homesteading during the late 19th and early 20th centuries, and was founded in the fall of 1907 as a result of the new Milwaukee Road transcontinental rail line known as the Pacific Extension, as well as other factors such as agriculture, and cheap land. The town was originally laid out on the east side of the Little Missouri River, near where a post office known as Neva and a hotel had already been established. However, due to problems with securing additional land on the east side of the river for a reasonable price, the city was moved to the opposite side in 1908. Later, many pioneers came here as a result of the Dust Bowl and in search of a new life in the American Midwest. Marmarth grew quickly to serve the hundreds of homesteaders who flooded into the area. Because the first two decades of the 20th century were unusually wet, the new settlers reaped harvests of wheat on a scale "that promised to turn even owners of modest farms into wealthy men." By 1920, Marmarth had 1,318 inhabitants. An auditorium, a theater, a large train station, a newspaper, and paved sidewalks were all established during this time.

During a spring thaw in April 1920, rural Marmarth rancher Jack Miller fled his home on horseback to escape the flooding Beaver Creek. When his horse slipped Miller, who had just one arm, found himself swimming in icy waters until he was able to climb aboard an iceberg. Miller managed to anchor the iceberg against a tree, and he danced on the berg all night in order to stay awake and avoid freezing. In the morning, he found safety at a neighbor's house.

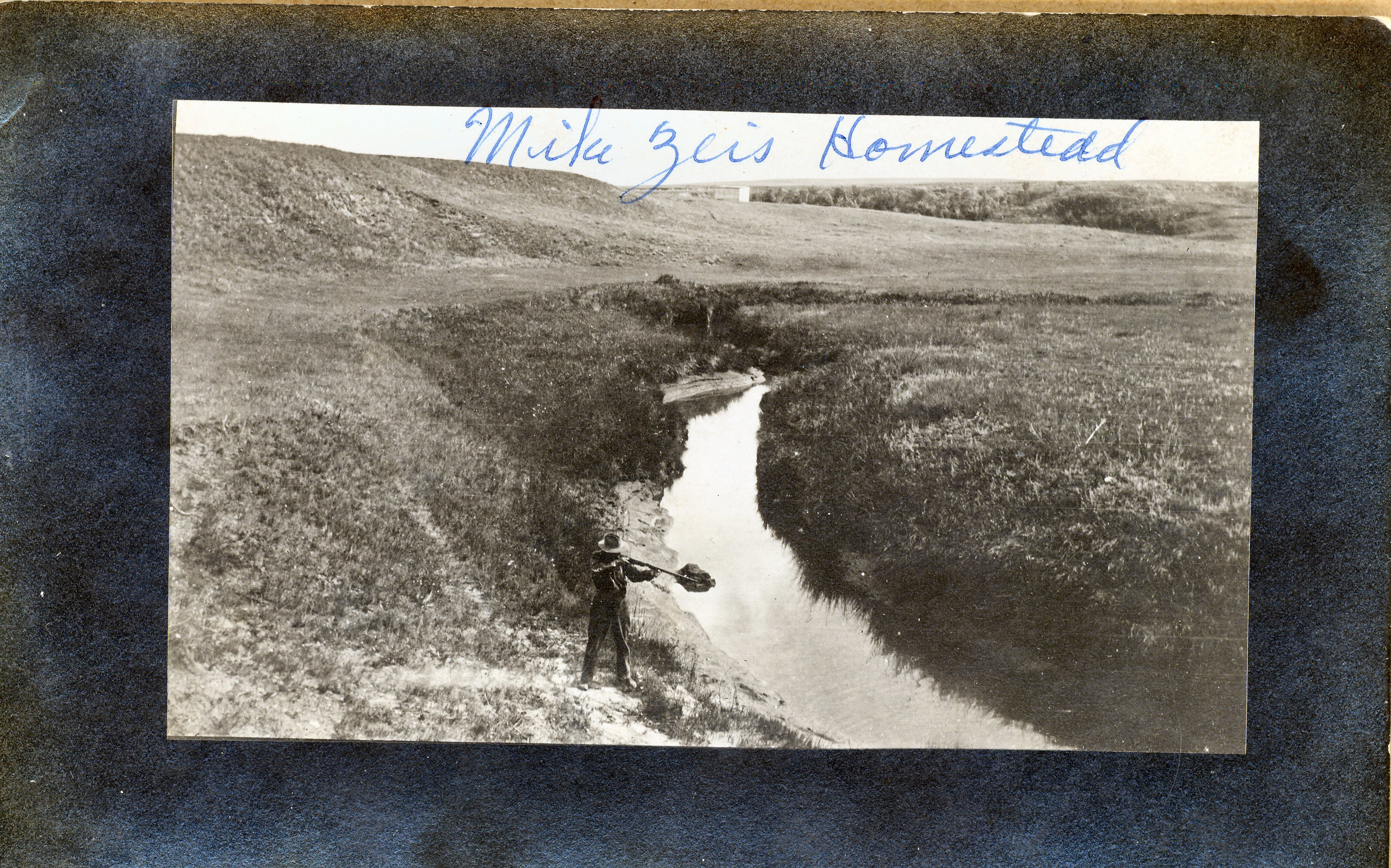
Homesteader hunting by the Little Missouri River, where Theodore Roosevelt killed his first buffalo a few years prior.

The population here once reached 1,300 in the early 20th century, but is now at 140. The town was the largest town on the Milwaukee railroad line in North Dakota by 1911, and was also the fifth largest town west of the Missouri River. Another one of the first pioneers, Michael Zeis (born 1885) of Holdingford, Minnesota described the town: “I also started one main cigar shop, made cigars all by hand in my spare time and sold them at Bowman, Rhame”. Zeis lived in the town from 1908 to 1918, working for the Chicago, Milwaukee, St. Paul and Pacific Railroad, but left the town when he was drafted for World War I in 1918. The town had its own doctor, pioneer Dr. Frederick A. Bordwell and the town soon opened its own Opera House, Barber Building, the Mystic Theatre in 1914, a car dealership and Canadian Frank Gibbs’ hardware store. The town was also known to jail the notorious Jesse James’ gang, consisting of the Old West outlaws Cole, Bob, and Jim. Gibbs later wrote about the town: “There were two banks, the post office, two hotels, a jewelry store, a gas station, a hospital, the train station, a meat store, a theatre, a car dealership, a laundry, and a hardware store”. By the 1920s, a combination of the end of the agricultural boom occasioned by World War I and a return to more normal (i.e., drier) climatic conditions drove many of the settlers from their farms. At the 1930 census, the town's population had declined nearly 50% from a decade earlier. This population decline has continued every census thereafter, with the number of residents in 2010 nearly 10% of the number recorded in 1920.

=== Fossil findings ===
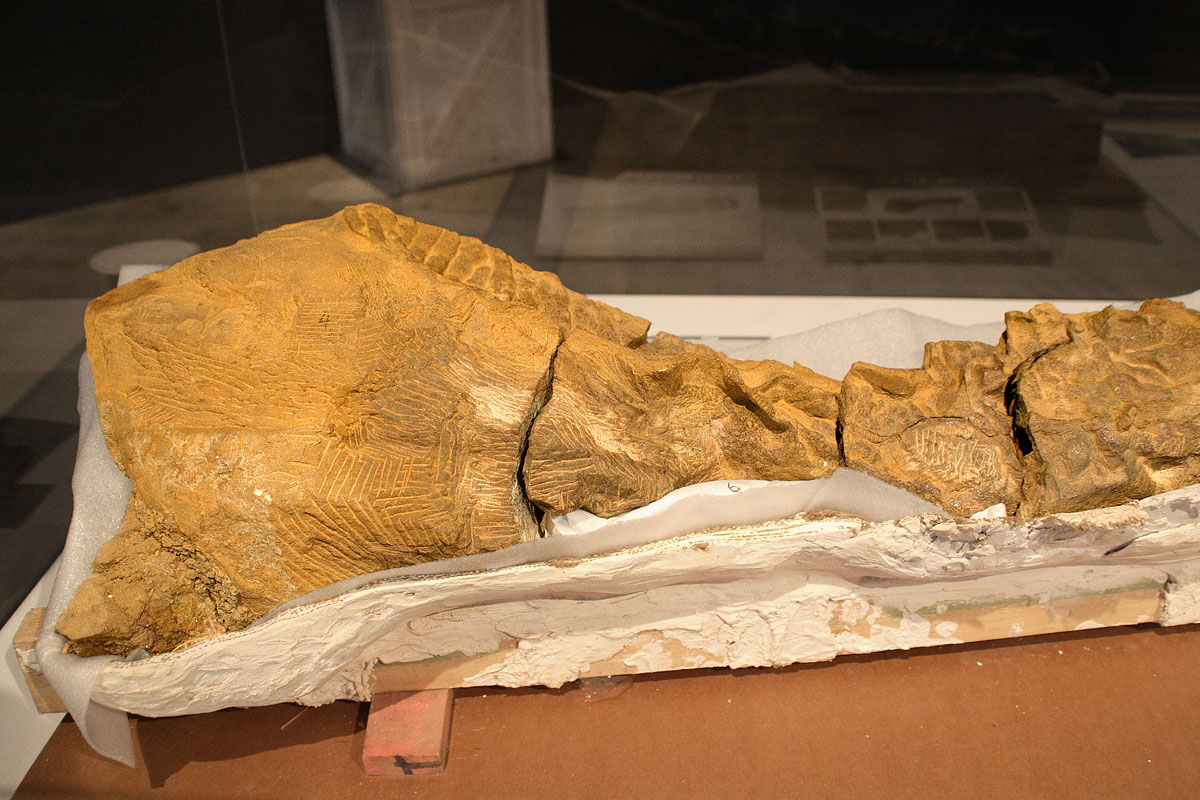
A segment of the Dakota fossil, bones from a 67-million-year-old dinosaur discovered in Marmarth in 1999.

Marmarth is the location of numerous dinosaur fossil findings, including the Dakota fossil. The Marmarth Historical Society and the Marmarth Research Foundation offer summer courses on archeological areas where triceratops and hadrosaurs have been excavated, including courses on fossil preparation, field techniques, dinosaur fossil preservation, and more. Dakota, a fossilized Edmontosaurus, a type of duckbill dinosaur, was discovered near Marmarth in 1999 by Tyler Lyson. The fossil is unique in that soft tissue, skin, and muscle were fossilized as well as bone.

== Politics ==
In 2014, it was estimated that 78 percent of the people of Marmarth were Republicans, 19 percent were Democrats, and 3 percent were independents. North Dakota is the only one of the 50 states which does not have voter registration, so exact figures are unavailable.

== Demographics ==
Historical population
Census	Pop.	Note	%±
1910	790		—
1920	1,318		66.8%
1930	721		−45.3%
1940	626		−13.2%
1950	469		−25.1%
1960	319		−32.0%
1970	247		−22.6%
1980	190		−23.1%
1990	144		−24.2%
2000	140		−2.8%
2010	136		−2.9%
2020	101		−25.7%
2022 (est.)	97		−4.0%
U.S. Decennial Census; 2020 Census

=== 2010 census ===
As of the census of 2010, there were 136 people, 64 households, and 35 families residing in the town. The population density was 54.4 inhabitants per square mile (21.0/km^{2}). There were 93 housing units at an average density of 37.2 per square mile (14.4/km^{2}). The racial makeup of the town was 89.7% White, 9.6% Native American, and 0.7% from two or more races. Hispanic or Latino of any race were 8.1% of the population.

There were 64 households, of which 25.0% had children under the age of 18 living with them, 46.9% were married couples living together, 4.7% had a female householder with no husband present, 3.1% had a male householder with no wife present, and 45.3% were non-families. 43.8% of all households were made up of individuals, and 20.3% had someone living alone who was 65 years of age or older. The average household size was 2.13 and the average family size was 2.91.

The median age in the town was 41 years. 23.5% of residents were under the age of 18; 4.4% were between the ages of 18 and 24; 27.3% were from 25 to 44; 24.3% were from 45 to 64; and 20.6% were 65 years of age or older. The gender makeup of the town was 54.4% male and 45.6% female.

=== 2000 census ===
As of the census of 2000, there were 140 people, 66 households, and 35 families residing in the town. The population density was 55.2 inhabitants per square mile (21.3/km^{2}). There were 101 housing units at an average density of 39.8 per square mile (15.4/km^{2}). The racial makeup of the town was 99.29% White, and 0.71% from two or more races. Hispanic or Latino of any race were 0.71% of the population.

There were 66 households, out of which 21.2% had children under the age of 18 living with them, 40.9% were married couples living together, 9.1% had a female householder with no husband present, and 45.5% were non-families. 42.4% of all households were made up of individuals, and 18.2% had someone living alone who was 65 years of age or older. The average household size was 2.12 and the average family size was 2.78.

In the town the population was spread out, with 19.3% under the age of 18, 5.0% from 18 to 24, 30.7% from 25 to 44, 26.4% from 45 to 64, and 18.6% who were 65 years of age or older. The median age was 43 years. For every 100 females, there were 109.0 males. For every 100 females age 18 and over, there were 98.2 males.

The median income for a household in the town was $29,219, and the median income for a family was $29,375. Males had a median income of $24,821 versus $20,625 for females. The per capita income for the town was $17,865. There were 10.2% of families and 16.1% of the population living below the poverty line, including 20.9% of under eighteens and 7.7% of those over 64.

== Wildlife ==
The area surrounding Marmarth in southern Theodore Roosevelt National Park is home to a large variety of wildlife species, including the pronghorn antelope, black-tailed prairie dog, feral horse, bison, bighorn sheep, elk, white-tailed deer, mule deer, wild turkey, bull snake, prairie rattlesnake, and avifauna such as the ferruginous hawk, golden eagle, greater sage-grouse, mountain bluebird, Brewer's sparrow, burrowing owl, lark bunting, chestnut-collared longspur, long-billed curlew, red-tailed hawk, common poorwill, chickadee, spotted towhee, lazuli bunting, and Clark's nutcracker.

== Places of interest ==
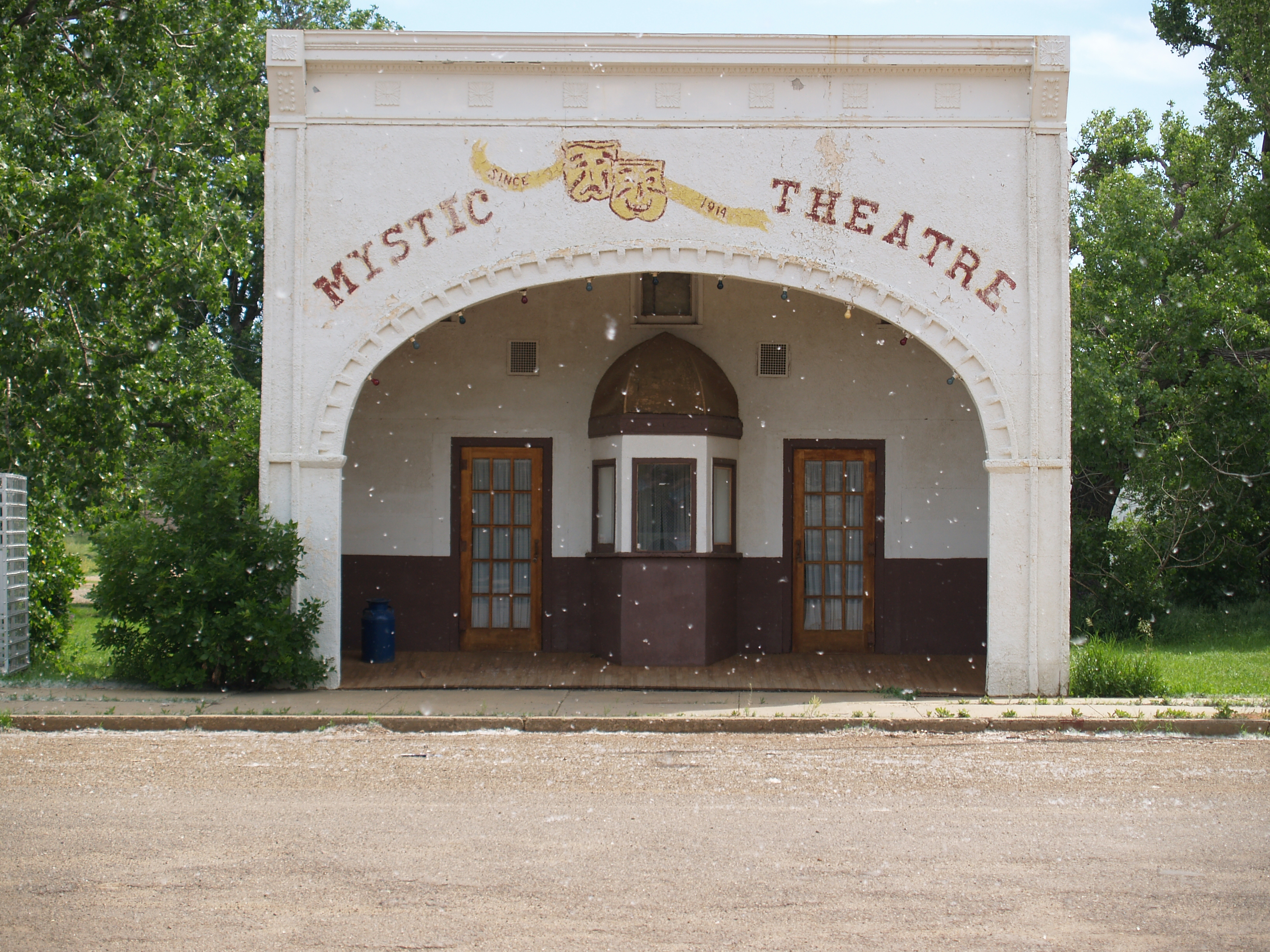
The Mystic Theatre has been on the U.S. National Register of Historic Places since 1977.

- Theodore Roosevelt National Park
- Mystic Theatre: theatre from 1914 on the National Register of Historic Places.
- Marmarth Research Foundation: Offers local dinosaur excavations.
- Theodore Roosevelt's squat house by Hay Creek.
- Fort Dilts, where Sitting Bull was shot and numerous Hunkpapa Sioux Indians killed. On the National Register of Historic Places.
- Big Gumbo, a 20,000 acre federally owned public wilderness area.
- Little Missouri National Grassland
- Marmarth Historical Society
- The Woman in Stone statue

== Notable people ==
- Tyler Lyson, paleontologist
