= Brad Bekkedahl =

American politician

President pro tempore of the North Dakota Senate
- In office January 5, 2025 – April 9, 2025
- Preceded by: Donald Schaible
- Succeeded by: Kyle Davison

Member of the North Dakota Senate from the 1st district
- Incumbent
- Assumed office January 6, 2015
- Preceded by: Stanley W. Lyson

Personal details
- Born: November 23, 1957 (age 68) Williston, North Dakota, U.S.
- Party: Republican
- Education: University of Jamestown (BA); University of Minnesota (BS, DDS)

Brad Bekkedahl (born November 23, 1957) is an American politician who has served in the North Dakota Senate from the 1st district since 2014.

North Dakota Senate
Preceded by Donald Schaible	President pro tempore of the North Dakota Senate; 2025	Succeeded by Kyle Davison
