= Larry Luick =

American politician

President pro tempore of the North Dakota Senate
- In office April 14, 2021 – January 3, 2023
- Preceded by: Randy Burckhard
- Succeeded by: Donald Schaible

Member of the North Dakota Senate from the 25th district
- Incumbent
- Assumed office December 2010
- Preceded by: Arden Anderson

Personal details
- Born: 1958 (age 67–68) Fairmount, North Dakota, U.S.
- Party: Republican
- Education: North Dakota State College of Science (AS)

Larry Luick (born 1958) is an American politician. He is a member of the North Dakota State Senate from the 25th District, serving since 2010. He is a member of the Republican party.

North Dakota Senate
Preceded by Randy Burckhard	President pro tempore of the North Dakota Senate; 2021–2023	Succeeded by Donald Schaible
