= Stanley W. Lyson =

American politician

Member of the North Dakota Senate from the 1st district
- In office 1999–2014
- Preceded by: James C. Yockim
- Succeeded by: Brad Bekkedahl

Personal details
- Born: March 5, 1936 (age 90) Parshall, North Dakota
- Party: Republican
- Spouse: Shirley
- Profession: retired sheriff

Stanley W. Lyson (born March 5, 1936) was a Republican member of the North Dakota Senate for the 1st district from 1999 to 2014.

== Biography ==
Stanley Lyson graduated from Minot State University. He served in the United States Army, is a retired sheriff, and served in the North Dakota Senate from 1999-2014.

He is President of the North Dakota Peace Officers Association and the North Dakota Association of Counties. He is a member of the American Legion and the Veterans of Foreign Wars. He is also a member of the Benevolent and Protective Order of Elks.

He is married to Shirley Lyson, and they have three children. They live in Williston, North Dakota and attend Gloria Dei Lutheran Church.
