= Michael Dwyer (North Dakota politician) =

American politician

Member of the North Dakota Senate from the 47th district
- Incumbent
- Assumed office December 1, 2018
- Preceded by: Ralph Kilzer

Personal details
- Born: June 13, 1952 (age 74) Williston, North Dakota, U.S.
- Party: Republican
- Spouse: Patricia
- Children: 6
- Education: St. Olaf College (BA); University of North Dakota (JD)

Michael A. Dwyer (born June 13, 1952) is an American attorney, farmer, and politician serving as a member of the North Dakota Senate from the 47th district. Elected in November 2018, he assumed office on December 1, 2018.

== Early life and education ==
Dwyer was born in Williston, North Dakota in 1952. He earned a Bachelor of Arts degree from St. Olaf College and a Juris Doctor from the University of North Dakota School of Law.

== Career ==
Dwyer was admitted to the State Bar Association of North Dakota in 1977. In addition to his work as a lawyer, Dwyer owned Dwyer Farms and was the executive director of the North Dakota Water Education Foundation. He was elected to the North Dakota Senate in November 2018 and assumed office on December 1, 2018. Since 2019, he has also served as vice chair of the Senate Judiciary Committee.

=== Legislative record ===
Since his election in 2019, Dwyer has introduced 27 bills and co-sponsored an additional 112.

In 2025, Dwyer garnered media attention for introducing a bill that would require intelligent design be included in science educational standards for the state.
