= Jeff Barta =

American politician

Member of the North Dakota Senate from the 43rd district
- Incumbent
- Assumed office December 1, 2022

Personal details
- Party: Republican
- Education: University of North Dakota (BS)

Jeff Barta is an American politician. He is serving as a member of the North Dakota Senate from the 43rd district. He is a member of the Republican Party.
