= Tyler Lyson =

American paleontologist (born 1982 or 1983)

- Born: 1982 or 1983 (age 42–43); Marmarth, North Dakota, United States
- Education: Swarthmore College (BA); Yale University (PhD)

Tyler R. Lyson (born 1982 or 1983) is an American paleontologist. He is the discoverer of the dinosaur fossil Dakota, a fossilized mummified hadrosaur. He has done significant research on the evolution of turtles and on the rise of mammals after the extinction of the dinosaurs.

Lyson was born and raised in Marmarth, North Dakota, a tiny town near the Badlands, an area known for its dinosaur fossils. As a child he roamed the Badlands collecting fossils. He started a business escorting visiting fossil hunters around the area when he was in the fifth grade. His local middle school had only three students in its graduating class; he commuted to nearby Baker, Montana for high school. He received his bachelor's degree in biology from Swarthmore College in 2006, and received a scholarship to study for his PhD in paleontology at Yale University, earning his PhD in 2012. After a postdoctoral position at the Smithsonian Institution, he became the curator of vertebrate paleontology at the Denver Museum of Nature and Science in 2014.

He found his first dinosaur, a hadrosaur, while in middle school. In 1999 when he was still in high school, Lyson discovered the Dakota dinosaur specimen while exploring the Hell Creek Formation in North Dakota, on his uncle's ranch. The find is unique since the fossilized remains include skin and other soft tissues in a non-collapsed state; a very few other finds have occurred where petrified soft tissue has been preserved, but in a collapsed or crushed state. He also found and classified numerous specimens of prehistoric turtles, which became a lifelong research interest of his.

Some of Lyson's research interests are focused around his field work in the Late Cretaceous Hell Creek Formation of southwestern North Dakota. He is currently working on two sites from this area: a large population of baenid turtles from a single locality and an exceptionally well-preserved hadrosaur dinosaur. Lyson is interested in the intraspecies variation found in baenid turtles and how this influences the interrelationships of the clade. Ultimately he plans to integrate this research with a more broad scale phylogenetic analysis of the transition of all turtle groups across the K/T boundary to determine the pattern of survival and extinction around this boundary. Lyson is also interested in soft tissue preservation found in dinosaurs. He plans to work on the recently collected hadrosaur dinosaur that has most of its integument preserved to determine how the soft tissue was preserved.

Lyson's work has been described in The Washington Post, The New York Times, and Good Morning America. He is also the co-founder with Harold Hanks of the Marmarth Research Foundation, located in his hometown, which provides volunteers with hands-on field and laboratory work on fossils.

In 2015 Lyson appeared, as a paleontologist, in the PBS documentary film, Making North America. His quest to discover why mammals became predominant after the extinction of the dinosaurs was the subject of the PBS "Nova" series film, Rise of the Mammals. The film recounts how he and a colleague searched for mammal fossils in Colorado but found very few. Then he examined a fossil found years before by Sharon Milito, a volunteer with the Denver Museum of Nature and Science and catalogued in the museum's collection. The specimen mammal palate was found above the Cretaceous–Paleogene boundary at Corral Bluffs, Colorado, indicating it followed the extinction of the dinosaurs, and was embedded in a concretion. Lyson and his colleagues decided to hunt for fossils embedded in concretions, and made unprecedented finds documenting the rise and early evolution of mammals.
