= Sean D. Cleary =

American economist and politician

Sean Cleary

Member of the North Dakota Senate from the 35th district
- Incumbent
- Assumed office January 3, 2023
- Preceded by: Tracy Potter

Personal details
- Born: 1991 (age 34–35) Bismarck, North Dakota, U.S.
- Party: Republican
- Spouse: Amy
- Children: 2
- Education: University of Mary (BS); University of North Dakota (Master's degree in Applied Economics)
- Profession: Education
- Website: website

Sean D. Cleary (born 1991) is an American economist and politician serving as a member of the North Dakota Senate from the 35th District.

== Early life and education ==
Cleary is a third-generation Bismarck resident, he attended St. Mary's Central High School, earned a BS from University of Mary in Bismarck and a Masters in Applied Economics from University of North Dakota in Grand Forks.

== Career ==
After college, Sean moved to Washington DC to serve on the staff of U.S. Senator John Hoeven. He returned to North Dakota to earn a master's degree in applied economics, later moving home to Bismarck and join the staff of Governor Doug Burgum.

Cleary worked as a project manager for National Information Solutions Cooperative, a technology company focused on serving rural electric cooperatives and broadband companies, as well as a Grant Writer for the Theodore Roosevelt Medora Foundation. He is currently working at the University of Mary.

== Politics ==
Cleary won the Republican primary for the 35th North Dakota State Senate nomination and faced Democratic nominee Tracy Potter in the general election.

Cleary served as the campaign manager for Julie Fedorchak’s successful U.S. House campaign in 2024.

Cleary has consistently argued for transparency and growth of the Legacy Fund, North Dakota’s oil and gas reserve fund, saying it should be used for things like “tax relief and investment in essential services.” He has supported divesting the fund from companies headquartered in China due to national security concerns, and he has also raised concerns about large bonuses planned to be paid out to staff out of the fund returns.

He has focused on health care affordability, including successful efforts to limit insulin costs and legislation supporting family caregivers.

== Personal life ==
Sean married his wife Amy in 2020. They live in Bismarck with their 2 children.

== Electoral history ==
2022 35th North Dakota State Senate election
Party	Candidate	Votes	%
Republican	Sean Cleary	3,644	59.9
Democratic	Tracy Potter	2,406	39.5
Total votes		6,077	100.00

2022 35th North Dakota State Senate Republican Primary
Party	Candidate	Votes	%
Republican	Sean Cleary	1,295	69.7
Republican	Ryan Eckroth	562	30.3
Total votes		1,857	100.00
