= Donald Schaible =

American politician (born 1957)

President pro tempore of the North Dakota Senate
- In office January 3, 2023 – January 5, 2025
- Preceded by: Larry Luick
- Succeeded by: Brad Bekkedahl

Member of the North Dakota Senate from the 31st district
- Incumbent
- Assumed office December 2010
- Preceded by: Terryl Jacobs

Personal details
- Born: 1957 (age 68–69) Elgin, North Dakota, U.S.
- Party: Republican
- Education: North Dakota State University (AS)

Donald Schaible (born 1957) is an American politician. He is a member of the North Dakota State Senate from the 31st District, serving since 2010. He is a member of the Republican party.

North Dakota Senate
Preceded by Larry Luick	President pro tempore of the North Dakota Senate; 2023–2025	Succeeded by Brad Bekkedahl
