= Dean Rummel =

American politician

Member of the North Dakota Senate from the 37th district
- Incumbent
- Assumed office December 1, 2022

Personal details
- Party: Republican

Dean Rummel is an American politician. He is serving as a member of the North Dakota Senate from the 37th district. He is a member of the Republican Party. Rummel served on the Dickinson, North Dakota school board from 1999 to 2010.
