= Kristin Kenner =

American politician

Member-elect of the North Dakota Senate from the 15th district
- Assuming office January 2027
- Succeeding: Kent Weston

Personal details
- Party: Republican

Kristin Kenner is an American politician and former dentist. A Republican, she is the Senator-elect for the 15th district of the North Dakota Senate.

== Career ==
Kenner graduated from the University of Minnesota in 1984. In 1985, she started her own dentistry practice, where she worked full-time until her retirement in 2024. She served as a member of the North Dakota Dental Board of Trustees, as well as the president of the North Dakota State Dental Association, becoming the first woman to hold the position.

In 2026, Kenner ran for the North Dakota Senate. She defeated incumbent Senator Kent Weston in the primary election, and won unopposed in the general election.

== Personal life ==
Kenner is married to Corry Kenner, a member-elect of the North Dakota House of Representatives. Together, they are the first married couple to serve in the North Dakota Legislature simultaneously.
