= Greg Kessel =

American politician

Member of the North Dakota Senate from the 39th district
- Incumbent
- Assumed office December 1, 2022

Personal details
- Party: Republican

Greg Kessel is an American politician. He is serving as a member of the North Dakota Senate from the 39th district. He is a member of the Republican Party.
