= Kyle Davison =

American politician

President pro tempore of the North Dakota Senate
- Incumbent
- Assumed office April 10, 2025
- Preceded by: Brad Bekkedahl

Member of the North Dakota Senate from the 41st district
- Incumbent
- Assumed office December 1, 2014
- Preceded by: Tony Grindberg

Personal details
- Party: Republican
- Spouse: Laura
- Children: 3
- Education: Valley City State University (BS); University of North Dakota (MS)

Kyle R. Davison is an American politician serving as a member of the North Dakota Senate from the 41st district. He assumed office on December 1, 2014.

== Education ==
Davison earned a Bachelor of Science degree in business administration from Valley City State University.

== Career ==
Since July 2005, Davison has worked as the executive director of the South East Education Cooperative in Fargo, North Dakota. He was elected to the North Dakota Senate on December 1, 2014. In the 2017 legislative session, Davison served as vice chair of the Senate Government and Veterans Affairs Committee. In the 2019–2020 session, he served as chair of the same committee. In the 2021–2022 legislative session, Davison is a member of the Senate Appropriations Committee.

North Dakota Senate
Preceded by Brad Bekkedahl	President pro tempore of the North Dakota Senate; 2025–present	Incumbent
