= Myron Koppang =

American politician

Member of the North Dakota House of Representatives from the 25th district
- In office December 1, 1998 – December 1, 2002
- Succeeded by: Clark Williams

Personal details
- Born: February 18, 1936 Portland, North Dakota
- Died: March 4, 2008 (aged 72) Wahpeton, North Dakota
- Party: Republican

Myron Koppang (February 18, 1936 – March 4, 2008) was an American politician who served in the North Dakota House of Representatives from the 25th district from 1998 to 2002.

He died on March 4, 2008, in Wahpeton, North Dakota at age 72.
