= Todd Beard =

American politician

Member of the North Dakota Senate from the 23rd district
- Incumbent
- Assumed office December 1, 2022

Personal details
- Party: Republican

Todd Beard is an American politician. He is serving as a member of the North Dakota Senate from the 23rd district. He is a member of the Republican Party. He resides in Williston, North Dakota. He was married in 1984 to Debra (Dauenhauer) Beard. The couple has two daughters, Kimberly and Kayla. He was born in Bismarck, North Dakota. Todd graduated from Hazelton High School.
