= List of presidents of Winona State University =

This is a list of Presidents of Winona State University. The head of the university was called the "principal" until 1880. Retroactively, they are called presidents. The incumbent is Kenneth Janz.

Presidents of Winona State University
No.	Image	President	Years	Notes	Honors
As Principal
1		John Ogden	September 3, 1860 – December 14, 1861	Resigned to fight in the American Civil War	Namesake of Ogden Hall (Note: Now replaced by Memorial Hall)
		David Burt & V. J. Walker	December 14, 1861 – May 16, 1864	Resident Director David Burt and Winona High School principal V. J. Walker are temporarily in charge.	
		John G. McMynn	May 16, 1864 – September 22, 1864	Elected; declined to take office	
2		William F. Phelps	September 22, 1864 – December 6, 1876	Resigned to become Vice President of the International Conference of Educators	Namesake for Phelps Hall
3		Charles A. Morey	December 6, 1876 – May 13, 1879	Resigned to pursue his legal career	Namesake for Morey Hall
		(Vacant)	May 13, 1879 – June 24, 1879		
As President
4		Irwin Shepard	June 24, 1879 – August 16, 1898	Resigned	Namesake for Shepard Hall
		(Vacant)	August 16, 1898 – December 8, 1898	Frank A. Weld elected, declined to take office. Morey serving as acting president.	
5		Jesse Fonda Millspaugh	December 8, 1898 – April 8, 1904	Resigned to become president of the California Normal School	
6		Guy E. Maxwell	April 8, 1904 – January 3, 1939	Died in office	Namesake for Maxwell Hall and Maxwell Field
		Arthur T. French	January 3, 1939 – June 12, 1939	Acting President after Maxwell's death. First of two terms.	
7		Oscar Myking Mehus	June 12, 1939 – June 2, 1943	Resigned. It was later alleged he was fired by the state government for political reasons.	
8		Arthur T. French	June 2, 1943 – May 18, 1944	Second of two terms.	
9		Nels Minne	May 18, 1944 – January 1, 1967	M.R. Raymond as administrative head in 1950 during Minne's research trip to Norway. Resigned to begin retirement.	Namesake for Minne Hall
10		Robert DuFresne	January 1, 1967 – August 1977	Resigned to return to teaching	Namesake for the Robert A. DuFresne Performing Arts Center
11		Robert Hanson	August 1977 – April 8, 1983	Resigned due to health issues. Suffered a brain aneurysm in 1981.	
		Helen Popovich	December 1981 – July 1, 1983	Acting president during Hanson's recovery, first woman given presidential powers	
12		Thomas Stark	July 1, 1983 – August 21, 1988	Died in office	Namesake for Stark Hall
		John "Jack" G. Kane	August 21, 1988 – 1989	Interim	Namesake for the Jack Kane Dining Hall
13		Darrell W. Krueger	1989 – 2005		Namesake for the Krueger Library
14		Judith A. Ramaley	2005 – May 16, 2012	Previously served as president of Portland State University and the University of Vermont, first woman to serve as president	
		Connie J. Gores	May 16, 2012 – July 16, 2012	Interim	
15		Scott Olson	July 16, 2012 – July 31, 2023	Resigned to become Chancellor of Minnstate	
		Kenneth Janz	August 1, 2023 – Present	Interim	
16		Kenneth Janz	August 1, 2023 – Present	Became permanent president on March 20, 2024	
