= Darrell W. Krueger =

13th President of Winona State University
- In office 1989–2005
- Preceded by: Thomas Stark; Jack Kane (Interim)
- Succeeded by: Judith A. Ramaley

15th President of Truman University
- In office 2008–2010

Personal details
- Born: 1943/1944 Cedar City, Utah
- Spouse: Nancy
- Education: Southern Utah State College; University of Arizona

Darrell W. Krueger (born 1943 or 1944) was an American educator who served as President of Winona State University (WSU) from 1989-2005, and of Truman University from 2008-2010.

== Biography ==
Krueger's hometown is Cedar City, Utah.

=== Career ===
Krueger graduated summa cum laude as co-valedictorian from Southern Utah State College in 1967, with a degree in political science and history. He continued education, gaining a masters degree in 1969 and a P.h.D. from the University of Arizona in 1971. He was hired as a political science professor at Truman University. In 1973, he was promoted to vice president for academic affairs and dean of instruction. In 1989, he accepted the presidency of Winona State University.

Upon taking office, he deviated from the policies of predecessors Nels Minne and Robert DuFresne, opposing the expansion of campus, which had rapidly expanded in previous decades. Krueger received criticism from students due to overcrowding, since the space of the campus did not meet the demand from the large student body. In January of 1990, a controversy occurred when he attempted to make it more difficult for students to drop classes. He addressed the Student Senate, who felt he was 'insulting' to them. Student reactions to Krueger's administration were divided. Some of the student body believed he was bringing welcome change, where as other students described him as a "nazi", "fascist", and "fanatic." The Student Senate, strongly opposed to Krueger, found itself powerless to move against him. That March, Krueger held a 'meet and discuss', which went without incident. In 1994, student consensus had shifted to be mostly positive. Despite friction between the Student Senate and Kruger continuing, he was praised for leading the construction of Stark Hall in 1992, and the school's academic success. During his time at WSU, he invested in the technologies, making the university of the most advanced in the country. He would also invest in greenspaces on campus, and oversaw the construction of the New Library. He overhauled Maxwell Field during his tenure, and expanded athletics facilities.

He left office in 2005, and then served as president of Truman University for another two years from 2008-2010 before his retirement.

In retirement, WSU gave him the title of President Emeritus.

=== Personal life ===
He was a member of the Woodrow Wilson Fellowship and Phi Beta Kappa. He lives in Enoch, Utah.

== Legacy ==
The New Library would be named Krueger Library after him, in 2005. In 2010, he was inducted into the Warrior Hall of Fame. In 2013, he given the Distinguished Service Award by WSU.
