= Oscar Myking Mehus =

- Mehus in military uniform, 1918

7th President of Winona State Teachers' College
- In office June 12, 1939 – June 2, 1943
- Preceded by: Arthur T. French (Interim); Guy E. Maxwell
- Succeeded by: Arthur T. French

Personal details
- Born: May 15, 1894 Brinsmade, North Dakota
- Died: November 19, 1983 (aged 89) Benson County, North Dakota
- Spouse(s): Emma Carolyn Mehus (née Hille); Jewell Ross Mehus
- Relatives: Belle Mehus, Hilde Mehus, Alma Mehus (sisters)
- Education: Augsburg University; University of North Dakota; University of Minnesota

Oscar Myking Mehus (May 15, 1894 – November 19, 1983) was an American educator who served as president of Winona State University (then Winona State Teachers' College).

== Early life and family ==
Myking Mehus was born on May 15, 1894 in Brinsmade, North Dakota, to Mikkel Knudson Mehus and Anne Olsdatter Myking Mehus, both immigrants from Hallingdal. He had three younger sisters. The oldest was Belle Mehus, founder and namesake of the Belle Mehus Auditorium. The next oldest was Hilde Mehus, a clinical psychologist, and the youngest was pianist Alma Mehus.

== Career ==
=== Principal and superintendent positions ===
In 1920, he published his dissertation, and received a Master of Arts degree from the University of North Dakota. He also graduated from Augsburg University. He was superintendent form Spring Grove. He then became a professor at Mayville State University from 1921 to 1924. He left to become professor of sociology at the Wittenberg College, where he taught from 1924 to 1926. In 1931, he received a Doctor of Philosophy degree from the University of Minnesota. After graduating, he would become a professor for Northwest Missouri State University. He would continue teaching there until 1939. In the summer of 1938 he took a position at the University of Minnesota Duluth, then known as the Duluth State Teachers College.

=== At Winona ===
In 1939, he became president of Winona State Teachers' College. He promised no major departures from the previous administration of Guy E. Maxwell. Despite this promise, Mehus would undertake major reforms. Whereas Maxwell undertook gradual reforms, Mehus was quick to implement changes. His most major change was reorganizing the school into academic departments, each headed by a person with a terminal degree in their field. This model had become standard across the country, but was a radical departure from the previous informal organization carried over from previous administrations. Mehus found himself at increasing odds with the faculty. Mehus had ambitious plans for campus expansion, wanting to build a new athletic building, music conservatory, and a student union. Due to the Second World War, none of these could be realized during his administration. His dreams would eventually be realized in the form of Memorial Hall, the Performing Arts Center, and Kryzsko Commons.

In 1943, he resigned from office to begin working for Veterans Affairs. It was believed at the time that his resignation was the cause of his own haste in reorganization and that individuals who disagreed with his 'radical' views wanted him removed. It was later alleged that Mehus was fired by the state government because his politics did not align with the Republican state administration.

=== Veterans Affairs ===
Following his time as an educator, Mehus would serve as chief of the vocational rehabilitation and education division for the Kansas City, Missouri regional office until 1960. He then moved to the regional office of St. Louis, Missouri until 1963.

=== Personal life ===
Mehus was a member of Phi Delta Kappa, Kappa Phi Kappa, and Phi Gamma Mu. He was a nationwide board member of the American Sociological Society. His wife, Emma Carolyn, was the daughter of Republican state representative Hans T. Hille. She died in 1941. They had three children together. He later remarried, marrying Jewell Ross Mehus. He was a liberal activist, and was later described by Robert DuFresne as well ahead of his time on social and political issues. He was known to give speeches on the significance of service, being sympathetic to the less fortunate, regardless of race, color, or creed, which was considered radical language for the time. He spoke at length of the necessity for students to be "learning the ways of democracy."

== Published Works ==
- The Statistical and Psychological Analysis of Ability in Arithmetic: Based upon the data from a Co-operative Study of the Courtis Standard Test in Arithmetic, series B, forms no. 1 and 2 (1920)
- Are High Schools Sufficiently Democratic? (1929)
- Academic Achievement of College Students in Different Kinds of Extra Curricular Activities (1934)
