= Scott Olson (disambiguation) =

Scott Olson (born 1954/1955) is an American guitarist, bassist, music producer and recording engineer.

Scott Olson may also refer to:

- Scott Olson (academic) (born 1959/1960) American academic
- Scott B. Olson (born 1959) American inventor
- Scotty Olson (born 1968) Canadian boxer

== See also ==
- Scott Olsen (born 1984) American baseball player
- Scott Olsen, American protester injured during Occupy Oakland
