= Arthur T. French =

- Arthur c. 1939

8th President of Winona State Teachers' College
- In office June 2, 1943 – May 18, 1944
- Preceded by: Oscar Myking Mehus
- Succeeded by: Nels Minne

Acting President of Winona State Teachers' College
- In office January 3, 1939 – June 12, 1939
- Preceded by: Guy E. Maxwell
- Succeeded by: Oscar Myking Mehus

Personal details
- Born: 1874 Danvers, Massachusetts
- Died: December 31, 1948 (aged 74) Danvers, Massachusetts
- Spouse: Mary Parker (m. 1908)
- Education: Massachusetts Normal School; Harvard University; Columbia University

Arthur T. French (1874 – December 31, 1948) was an American educator. He served as acting president of Winona State Teachers' College (now Winona State Univerity) twice, first in 1939, and again from 1943-1944.

== Biography ==
French was born in 1874 in Danvers, Massachusetts. His family emigrated from England in 1647, and he claimed one of his ancestors was hung during the Salem witch trials. He attended Salem High School. After graduating high school, he spend eight years in the rubber footwear business, before deciding to attend the Massachusetts Normal School.

=== Career ===
He received his bachelor of science degree at Harvard University in 1907. He married his wife, Mary, in June 1908. In 1913, he began teaching at Robert College in Turkey. In 1915, he went to New York to visit family, but was unable to return to Europe due to World War I. He earned his master's degree at Columbia University in 1917. French began teaching at the Winona State Teachers' College in 1918.

French's first stint as acting president came in 1939, with the sudden death of Guy E. Maxwell. He then served as head of the mathematics department until the resignation of Oscar Myking Mehus in 1943, being chosen for a one-term presidency. French's presidency would be one mostly of planning. Due to the ongoing Second World War, nearly all students had left, and some of the staff. The main administrative task was preparing for the flood of veterans expected to attend after the war's end. French would not see these plans be put into action, as he retired once the spring 1944 semester was complete. French was a vocal supporter of his successor, chemistry professor Nels Minne. He introducing Minne to the student body by saying "Some one once told me - if you want to get things done, find a chemist to do them." After his presidency, he retired, moving to Massachusetts. He died on December 31, 1948, after a short illness.
