= Winona State Warriors =

Intercollegiate sports teams of Winona State University

- University: Winona State University
- Nickname: Warriors
- NCAA: Division II
- Conference: Northern Sun Intercollegiate Conference
- Athletic director: Jennifer Flowers
- Location: Winona, Minnesota
- Varsity teams: 14 (5 men's, 9 women's)
- Football stadium: Maxwell Field
- Basketball arena: McCown Gymnasium
- Baseball stadium: Loughrey Field
- Softball stadium: Maynard R. Johnson Field
- Soccer stadium: Maxwell Field
- Tennis venue: Winona Tennis Center
- Outdoor track and field venue: Sports & Recreation Complex
- Volleyball arena: McCown Gymnasium
- Colors: Purple and white
- Mascot: Wazoo
- Website: winonastatewarriors.com
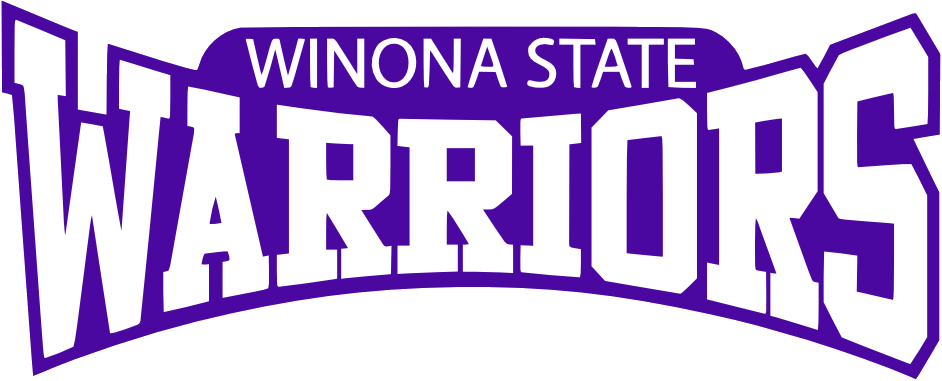

The Winona State Warriors are the athletic teams of Winona State University, located in Winona, Minnesota. They compete in the National Collegiate Athletic Association, Division II for all sports except for women's gymnastics, which competes in the National Collegiate Gymnastics Association.

There are 14 teams (9 women's, 5 men's) representing Winona State University on the varsity level. All varsity sports compete in the Northern Sun Intercollegiate Conference, with the exception of the women's gymnastics team which competes in the Wisconsin Intercollegiate Athletic Conference.

== History ==
The school's first national championship came in 1985 when the gymnastics team took the National Association of Intercollegiate Athletics (NAIA) title, claiming four individual champions and 11 All-American honors, along with National Coach and Gymnast of the Year. The same year, the Warrior gymnastics team competed in the NCAA Division II nationals in Springfield, Massachusetts, taking home the third-place trophy, the first Winona State team to compete in both affiliations at the national level. The Warriors claimed the NAIA national title again in 1987, this time paced by one individual champion and seven All-American honors. Two gymnasts were named Academic All-Americans for their outstanding academic achievements, and the National Coach of the Year award went to Winona State University's head coach.

In the three following years, the gymnasts finished strong in the NCAA II regional competitions and sent individuals to the Division II nationals in 1986 (2) and 1987 (1). In 1989, the team represented the school at the Division II nationals in California after a record-breaking season.

The Winona State University football team won the Northern Sun Intercollegiate Conference championship ten times in 15 years (1993–2007). The Warriors have also appeared in the NCAA postseason playoffs seven times. During the 1993 season they appeared in the NAIA I playoffs and they appeared in the NCAA II playoffs in 2001, 2003, 2004, 2006, and 2017. They also participated in the Mineral Water Bowl in 2000, 2002, 2012, and 2019.

The men's basketball team won the 2006 NCAA Men's Division II Basketball Championship, the university's first NCAA title. On March 7, 2007, the men's basketball team won its 53rd consecutive regular or postseason victory, beating the Division II mark set by Langston University. The streak ended at 57 on March 24, 2007, with a 77-75 loss at the Division II Championship game to the Barton College Bulldogs on a last-second shot. On March 29, 2008, the men's basketball team defeated Augusta State University 87-76 to win its second NCAA Division II National Championship in three years.

Winona State's softball team appeared in one Women's College World Series in 1974 and 2009.

Winona State's baseball team played for a national championship on June 4, 2011, facing West Florida in Cary, North Carolina, in the final of the NCAA Division II World Series, and finishing second.

The women's cross-country team qualified for the NCAA DII National Cross-Country Championships three times (2012, 2023, and 2024) placing 9th, 5th, and 14th overall.

== Varsity teams ==
Men's sports	Women's sports
Baseball	Basketball
Basketball	Cross country
Cross country	Golf
Football	Gymnastics
Golf	Soccer
	Softball
	Tennis
	Track and field
	Volleyball

=== Baseball ===
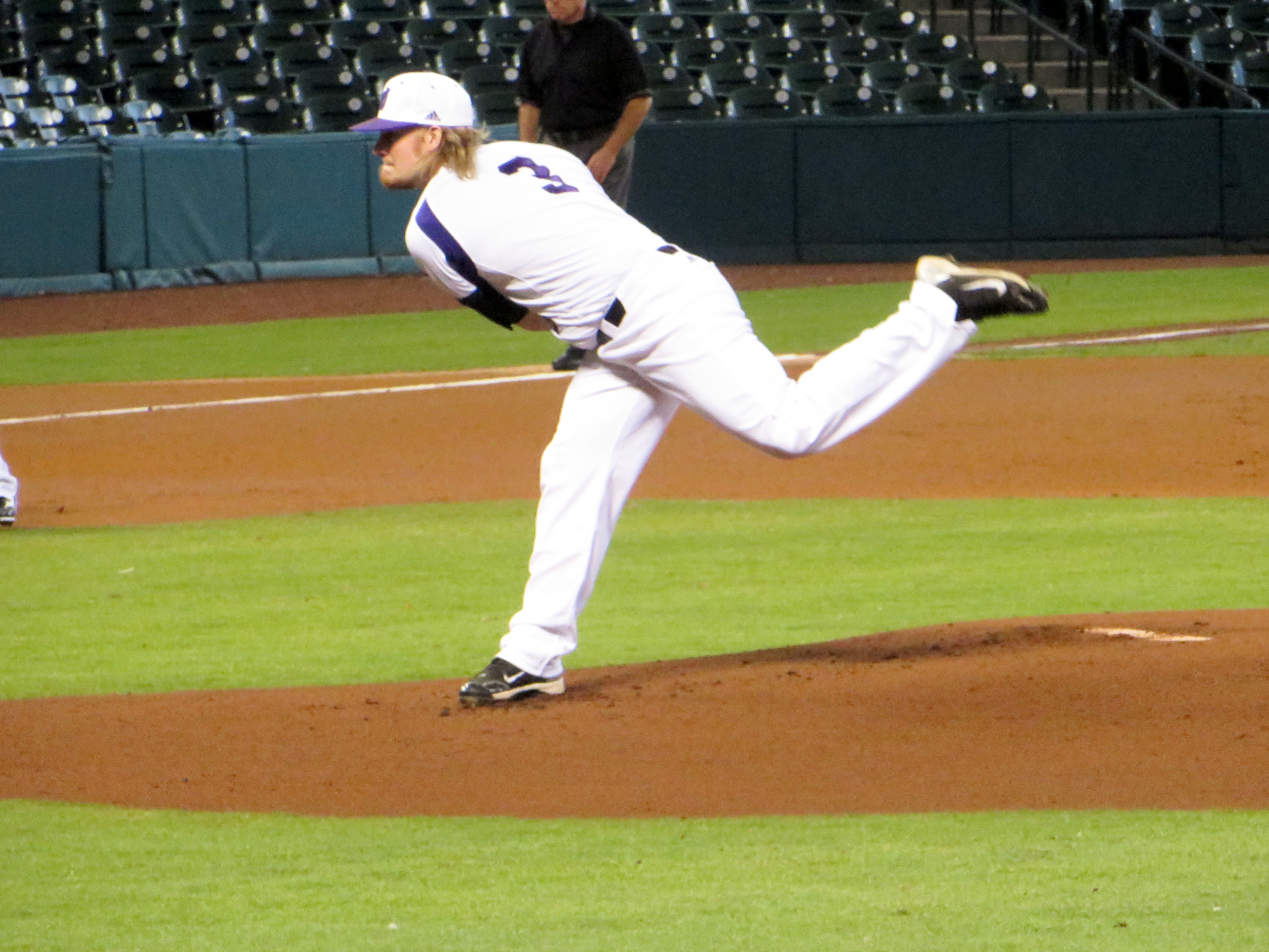
Baseball pitcher Mike Wasilik in 2014

Winona State baseball has been coached by Kyle Poock, who has led the team since 2003. The Warriors have made the NCAA tournament six times (1998, 2000, 2007, 2010, 2011 2012) and the NAIA tournament 21 times. WSU has made it to the NAIA World Series six times, most recently in 1992. Winona State has made it to one NCAA World Series, coming in 2011 when they finished as runner-up. The Warriors have only had one losing season since 1947, coming the 1982 season.

Former head coach Gary Grob won 1,020 games in his career, making him one of nine coaches in NCAA Division II history to have achieved the mark (as of the 2013 season). Grob coached Winona State from 1967 to 1974, then again from 1976 to 2002.

=== Men's Basketball ===
The Warriors have won 2 National Championships (2006 and 2008), 5 NSIC Tournament Championships (2001, 06, 07, 08, 11), 14 NSIC Regular Season Championships, 9 NCAA Division II Tournament Appearances and 4 NAIA Division I Tournament Appearances In the 2007–08 season, the Warriors won 38 games, which stands as an NCAA record for wins in a single season, tied with the Kentucky Wildcats. Over the course of two seasons, the Warriors won an NCAA Division II record 57 consecutive games.

=== Football ===
The Winona State Warriors are coached by Brian Curtin. The team plays at Maxwell Field at Warrior Stadium. The Warriors have won 18 NSIC titles, most recently in 2007. The Warriors added three south division titles (2010, 2012, 2022) when NSIC split into divisions. They have made seven NCAA postseason appearances (2001, 2003, 2004, 2006, 2007, 2017, 2022), as well as one NAIA postseason appearance in 1993. In addition, the Warriors have played in four Mineral Water Bowls (2000, 2002, 2012, 2019).

=== Soccer ===
Women's Soccer has been a sponsored sport at Winona State since the 1995 season. They are coached by Ali Omar. As of the end of the 2013 season, the Warriors all-time record is 272–88–23. Ali Omar has been the only head coach in the team's history. The Warriors made the NCAA playoffs four times (2001, 2007, 2008, 2010 and 2013). The Warriors have won 11 conference titles, most recently in 2011. Winona State has posted a losing record only once, the 1995 campaign when they went 1–7.

== Softball ==
Winona State softball is led by Greg Jones, who has coached the Warriors since the 2001 season. The Warriors have made the NCAA tournament ten times, most recently in 2014. The Warriors have appeared in two Women's College World Series, in 1974 (no divisions) and 2009.

== Facilities ==
Winona State's facilities include:

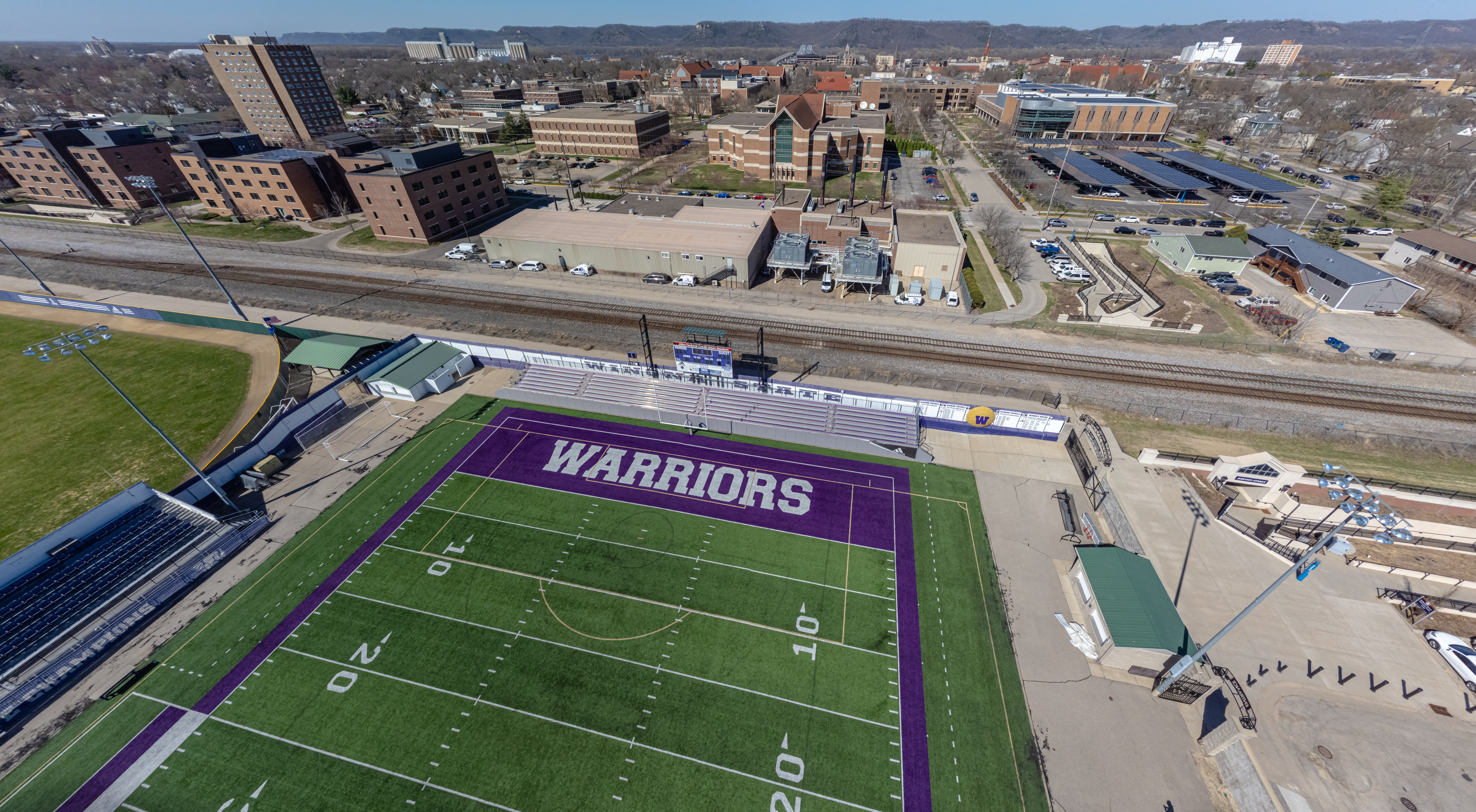
Maxwell Field, home to the Warriors' football and soccer teams

Venue	Sport(s)
Maxwell Field	Football; Soccer
McCown Gymnasium	Basketball; Volleyball; Gymnastics
Loughrey Field	Baseball
Maynard R. Johnson Field	Softball
Winona Tennis Center	Tennis
Winona Community Sports & Recreation Complex	Track and field

== Championships ==
Winona State University has enjoyed a varied level of success since the first fielding athletic teams in the late 1800s. Several teams have captured conference, regional and national honors.

=== National titles ===
Sport	Assoc.	Titles	Winning years
Basketball (men's)	NCAA	2	2006, 2008
Gymnastics (women's)	NAIA	2	1985, 1987

=== Conference titles ===
Sport	Assoc.	Titles	Winning years
Baseball	NSIC	35	Regular Season (31): 1948, 1949, 1950, 1951, 1952, 1953, 1954, 1955, 1957, 1958, 1961, 1962, 1963, 1966, 1972, 1973, 1975, 1977, 1980, 1984, 1985, 1986, 1987, 1988, 1989, 1990, 1991, 1995, 1998, 2000, 2001 Tournament (4): 1990, 1998, 2000, 2007
Basketball (men's)	NSIC	19	Regular Season (14): 1938, 1939, 1951, 1969, 1972, 1973, 1974, 1975, 1999, 2000, 2005, 2006, 2007, 2008 Tournament (5): 2001, 2006, 2007, 2008, 2011
Basketball (women's)	NSIC	2	Regular Season (1): 2016 Tournament (1): 2011
Cross Country (men's)	NSIC	1	1988
Cross Country (women's)	NSIC	3	2004, 2023, 2025
Football	NSIC	18	1939, 1947, 1956, 1957, 1962, 1964, 1968, 1983, 1993, 1994, 1997, 1998, 2000, 2001, 2003, 2004, 2005, 2007
Golf (men's)	NSIC	16	1958, 1965, 1990, 1992, 1993, 1994, 1995, 2001, 2003, 2004, 2005, 2006, 2007, 2019, 2021, 2026
Golf (women's)	NSIC	5	1988, 1995, 1996, 1997, 1998
Soccer (women's)	NSIC	17	Regular Season (11): 1999, 2000, 2002, 2004, 2005, 2006, 2007, 2008, 2009, 2010, 2011 Tournament (6): 1999, 2000, 2002, 2004, 2005, 2010
Softball	NSIC	13	Regular Season (6): 2003, 2005, 2007, 2018, 2019, 2026 Tournament (7): 1999, 2003, 2008, 2009, 2014, 2015, 2018
Tennis (women's)	NSIC	8	1994, 1998, 2001, 2002, 2003, 2005, 2006, 2007
Track and Field (Indoor women's)	NSIC	2	2005, 2006
Track and Field (Outdoor women's)	NSIC	2	2005, 2017
Wrestling	NSIC	4	1966, 1967, 1970, 1971

== Facilities ==
Maxwell Field at Warrior Stadium is the home the men's football and women's soccer teams. McCown Gym is home to men's and women's basketball teams, as well as the women's volleyball and women's gymnastics teams. Home tennis match are played at the SMU Tennis Center, near WSU's west campus. Baseball games are played at Loughrey Field. Softball games are played at Alumni Field.
