= Maxwell Field (disambiguation) =

Maxwell Field is a former military airfield now known as Maxwell Air Force Base, in Montgomery, Alabama, United States.

Maxwell Field may also refer to:

- Maxwell Field (stadium), a former high school football stadium in Louisville, Kentucky, United States
- Maxwell Field at Warrior Stadium, a stadium on the campus of Winona State University in Winona, Minnesota, United States
