= Alma Mehus =

American pianist (1902–2001)

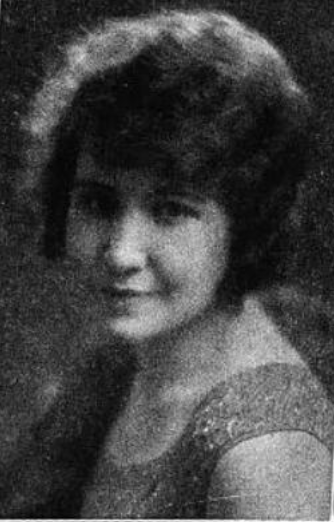
- Alma Mehus, from a 1927 publication
- Born: December 3, 1902; Brinsmade, North Dakota, U.S.
- Died: April 9, 2001 (age 98); Devils Lake, North Dakota, U.S.
- Other name: Alma Studness
- Occupations: Pianist, arts administrator
- Relatives: Oscar Myking Mehus (brother)

Alma Mehus Studness (December 3, 1902 – April 9, 2001) was an American pianist in the 1920s, and an arts community leader in North Dakota through the mid-twentieth century. In 1995 she made a large donation to the University of North Dakota to create the Chautauqua Gallery in Devils Lake.

== Early life and education ==
Mehus was born on a farm near Brinsmade, North Dakota, and raised in Fessenden, the daughter of Mikkel K. Mehus and Anne Myking Mehus. Both of her parents were Norwegian immigrants. Her family was musical; her father played violin, and her older sister Belle was Mehus's first piano teacher. She won a statewide piano contest for high school students in 1919. She studied at the American Conservatory of Music under Josef Lhevinne and Cora Kiesselbach, with Adele aus der Ohe in Europe, and at the Curtis Institute of Music with Moriz Rosenthal.

== Career ==
To supplement her scholarship at the American Conservatory of Music, Mehus played piano at Chicago hotels and events. In 1922 she toured as a pianist on the Chautauqua circuit in the American West. She toured in Germany, Norway, and Italy, and was the youngest American to appear as a soloist with the Berlin Philharmonic, when she played a Tchaikovsky concerto there in 1924. In 1925 she toured as a concert pianist in North Dakota. She toured the United States in 1926 and 1927, and performed on radio concerts.

After she married in 1929, Mehus taught music, and was active with her sister Belle in promoting the arts in North Dakota. She was a member of the North Dakota Council of the Arts, and a founder of the Devils Lake Music Teachers Association. She was inducted into the North Dakota Hall of Fame in 1932. She continued giving concerts, and she was a guest artist at the annual music festival of the North Dakota Federation of Music Clubs in 1934.

Studness received the Governor's Award for the Arts in 1989. In 1995, she made a major donation to the University of North Dakota, to open the Chautauqua gallery in Devils Lake.

== Publications ==
- "Lessons Under Adele Aus der Ohe" (1926)

== Personal life and legacy ==
Mehus married Leo Studness in 1929. They had a daughter, Anne-Marit, and a son, Charles. Her husband died in 1993, and Alma Studness died in 2001, at the age of 98, in Devils Lake. Mehus, her sister, and her daughter were the subjects of a biography, Roses of the Prairie: The Artistry of Belle Mehus, Alma Mehus Studness, and Anne-Marit Studness (2019) by LaWayne Leno.
