= KQAL =

Radio station at Winona State University in Winona, Minnesota

- Winona, Minnesota; United States
- Frequency: 89.5 MHz (HD Radio)

Programming
- Format: Variety
- Affiliations: NBC News Radio, AMPERS

Ownership
- Owner: Winona State University

History
- First air date: December 12, 1975

Technical information
- Licensing authority: FCC
- Facility ID: 72955
- Class: C3
- ERP: 2,500 watts
- HAAT: 210.3 meters
- Transmitter coordinates: 44°1′52.00″N 91°38′31.00″W

Links
- Public license information: Public file; LMS
- Website: kqal.org

KQAL (89.5 FM) is a radio station broadcasting a Variety format. Licensed to Winona, Minnesota, United States. The station is currently owned by Winona State University and features local programming, plus programs from other educational and community-based radio stations. The station's tagline is 'The Winona Music Experience.' The station has multiple shifts; the Wake Up Winona, the Morning Mix, the Drive By, Prime Time, and the Late Shift.

== History ==
KQAL-FM at Winona State University in Winona, Minnesota went on the air on December 12, 1975 as a ten watt station. An alternative independent radio station from the beginning, broadcasting began from the roof of the Performing Arts Center. It initially aired for only four hours a day. KQAL has been staffed primarily by students from its inception.

In 1980 KQAL, Winona's alternative music radio, was placed under the jurisdiction of the newly created Mass Communication Department at WSU. KQAL increased its power output to 1,100 watts in 1981 and it became a member of the Associated Press. In 1985, the station began sports coverage.

In 1989, the power output was increased to 1,800 watts and the transmitter moved from the roof of the Performing Arts Center to a 400-foot tower leased from KWNO (AM) on Garvin Heights. Also in '89 two satellite receiving dishes were installed at the Performing Arts Center.

The entire studio complex was remodeled in 1991 with new equipment and computers.

In 1993, the university proposed cutting the station's budget and air time. The plan was met with near universal disapproval and was abandoned.

In 1995, the station's website went online and computer based digital audio editing equipment was installed. KQAL continued the transition to the digital era in 1998 when computer based, hard drive audio storage and automation was introduced, virtually eliminating the use of tape at the station. The original system was replaced in 2002 with a new, more robust and reliable system.

In 2009 KQAL began a move from the Performing Arts Center to Phelps Hall which was extensively remodeled and new radio and TV studios were constructed. KQAL began broadcasting from these new studios in 2010.

During his tenure, president Scott Olson would sometimes be a guest DJ. The station began HD transmission in 2021, funded by a budget surplus caused by student workers leaving due to COVID-19. In 2025, KQAL celebrated its 50th anniversary with a live outdoor concert.

== See also ==
- Campus radio
- List of college radio stations in the United States
