= Gary Grob =

American baseball coach

Gary Grob is a retired college baseball head coach. He produced 1,020 wins while coaching Winona State University from 1967 to 1974 and again from 1976 to 2002, and is Minnesota's all-time winner in victories won by a college baseball head coach. He retired after the 2002 season, with former assistant Kyle Poock taking his place in charge of the baseball program.

As of 2013, Grob's 1,020 wins at Winona State place him eighth on the all-time NCAA list for Division II.

== Awards ==
NAIA Baseball Hall of Fame Class of 1989

ABCA Hall of Fame Class of 2001

Winona State Hall of Fame Class of 2006

NSIC Hall of Fame Class of 2006

Baseball #8 Jersey Retired
