= Great River Shakespeare Festival =

Professional equity theatre company in Winona, Minnesota

Coordinates: 44°03′08″N 91°37′58″W

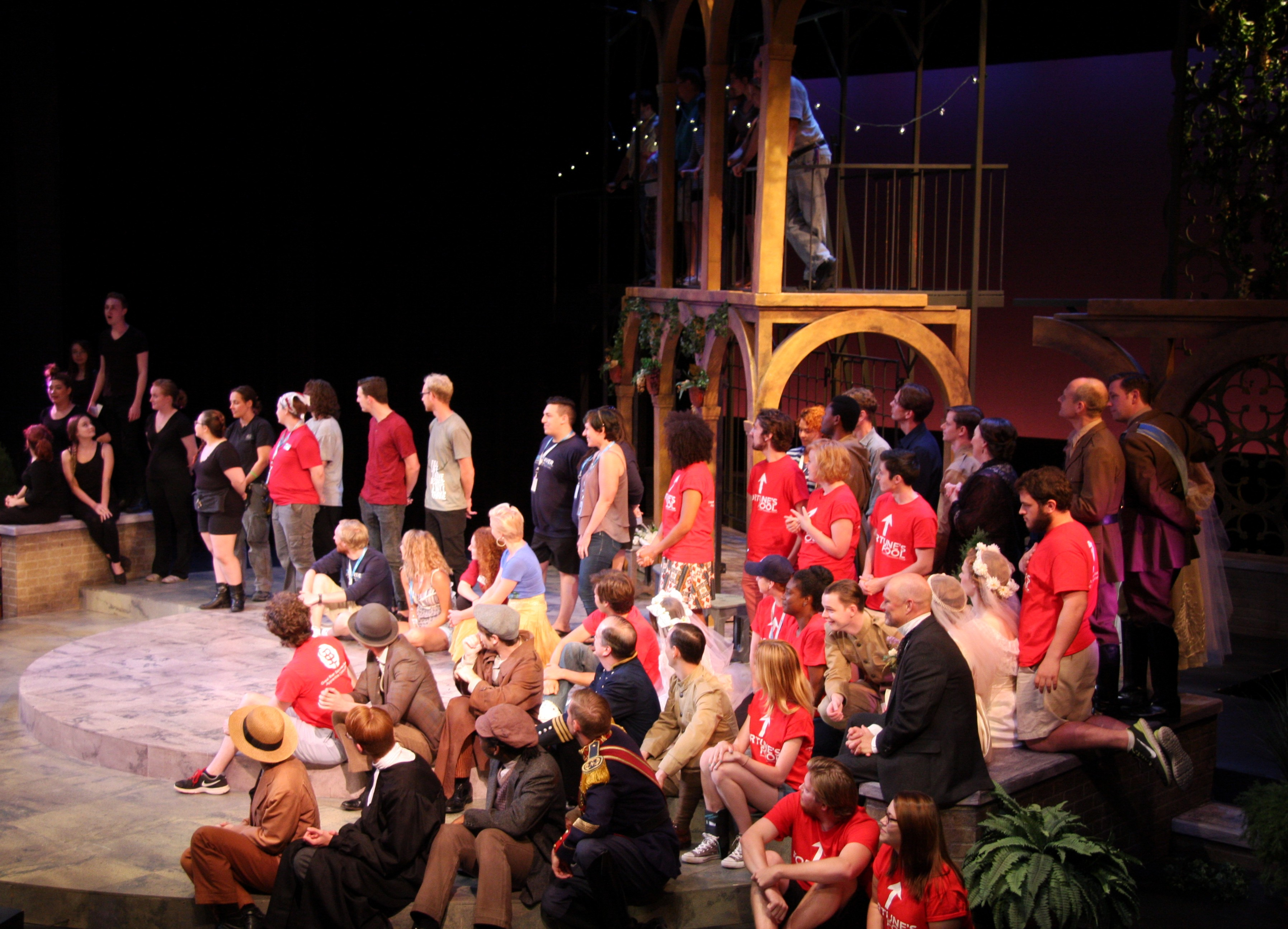
GRSF 2015 season closing ceremony on the set of "Much Ado About Nothing"

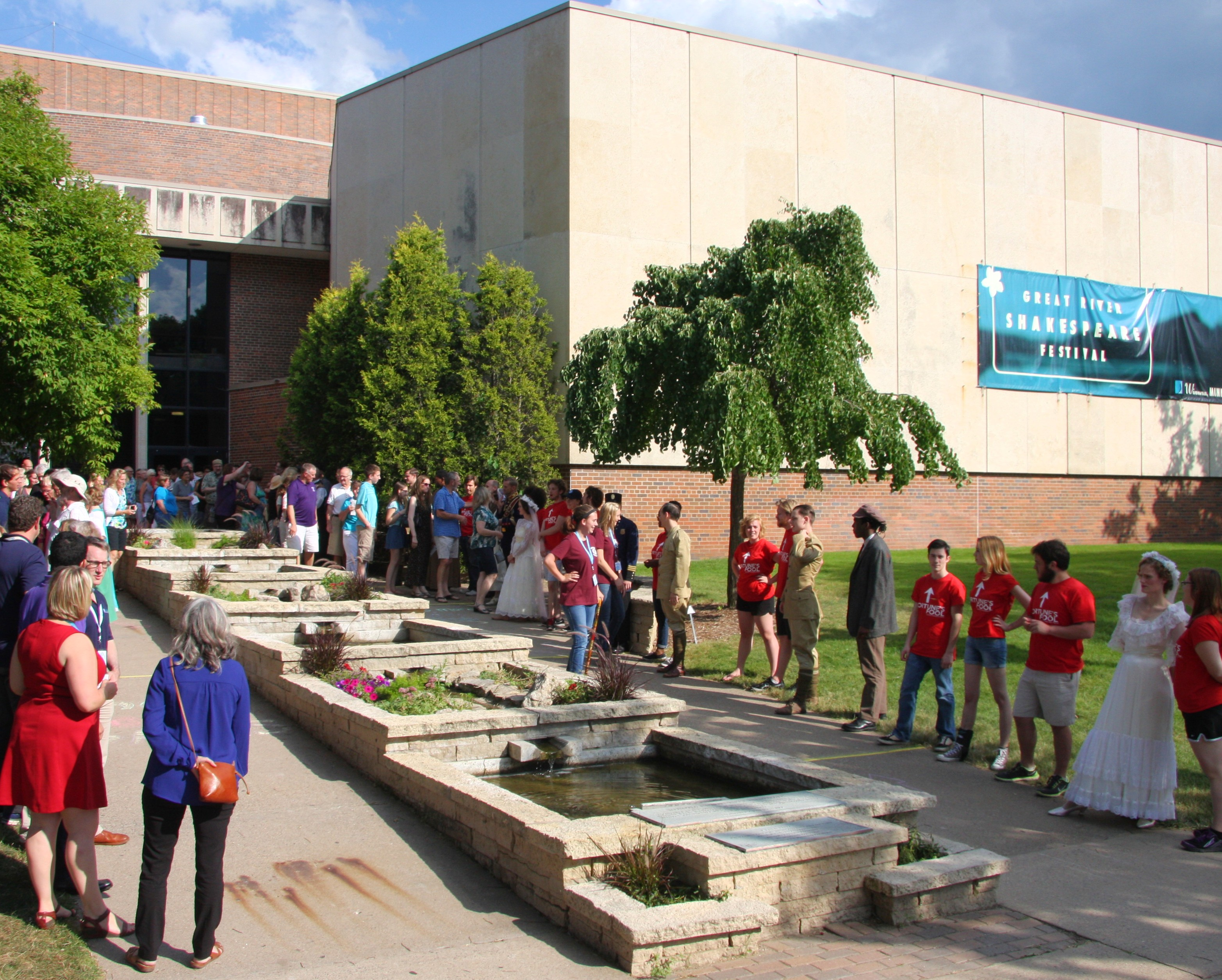
GRSF 2015 company greeting the audience at the Winona State University Performing Arts Center

The Great River Shakespeare Festival (GRSF) is a professional equity theatre company in Winona, Minnesota, a Mississippi River town in the southeastern part of the state. Starting in 2004, it has produced several simultaneous performances each summer, with annual audiences of over 10,000. GRSF's performances currently take place in Winona's historic Masonic Temple. Its 2026 season ran June 24 through July 26.

GRSF has been described as "a cornerstone of Winona’s reputation as an unmatched destination for cultural events". The festival features many artistic, musical, and other events, such as an annual sonnet contest with entries from around the world. Additionally, Company Conversations, weekly talkbacks with company members, are hosted Sunday mornings.

GRSF also offers educational opportunities, especially for youth. Youth classes are offered for grades 7-12, titled Shakespeare for Young Actors (SYA), Shakespeare for Young Designers (SYD), and Shakespeare for Young Filmmakers (SYF). For grade school students, GRSF offers a half-day workshop called Will’s Creative Drama (Age 4-Grade 2) and a full day, week long class known as Will’s Power Players (Grades 3-6). Scholarship opportunities, made possible through donors, are available for these courses. For adults, the Great River Collegium group organizes to study the plays being performed that season.

Near the end of every season, GRSF company members produce a one-night performance known as Callithump, "a ridiculously fun, boisterous and wildly entertaining" fundraiser and variety show. Typical acts include singing, skits, and more. Additionally, the event hosts an auction where costume and set pieces are commonly auctioned off. Company members who participate in this show are colloquially known as "Thumpians". Oftentimes this is accompanied by outdoors pre-Callithump activities, which have previously included a dunk tank and other carnival-esque attractions.

From 2004-2025, GRSF's shows were held at the Winona State University DuFresne Performing Arts Center. During the summer of 2025, GRSF began to move into the historic Winona Masonic Temple, now known as The ARC. GRSF manages this space year-round, and partner with several “resident orgs” (other non-profits who have ongoing storage and/or office space in the building) and event renters (non-profits who host occasional events throughout the year).

== Professional company productions ==
- 2004 (debut year): The Winter's Tale and A Midsummer Night's Dream
- 2005: Richard III and Much Ado About Nothing
- 2006: Romeo and Juliet and Twelfth Night
- 2007: Macbeth and As You Like It
- 2008: The Merchant of Venice and The Taming of the Shrew
- 2009: The Tempest and Love's Labours Lost
- 2010: The Comedy of Errors, Othello, and The Daly News
- 2011: Henry IV, Part 1, A Midsummer Night's Dream and The Fantasticks
- 2012: The Two Gentlemen of Verona, King Lear, and The Complete Works of William Shakespeare (Abridged)
- 2013: Twelfth Night, or What You Will, and King Henry V
- 2014: The Merry Wives of Windsor, Hamlet, and Rosencrantz & Guildenstern are Dead
- 2015: Romeo & Juliet, Much Ado About Nothing, and The Glass Menagerie
- 2016: As You Like It, Julius Caesar, and Georama
- 2017: The Comedy of Errors, Richard III, Shipwrecked! An Entertainment: The Amazing Adventures of Louis de Rougemont by Donald Margulies, and An Iliad
- 2018: All's Well That Ends Well, A Midsummer Night's Dream, Shakespeare in Love, and Venus in Fur
- 2019: Macbeth, Cymbeline, The Servant of Two Masters adapted by Beth Gardiner, No Child... by Nilaja Sun, and White Rabbit, Red Rabbit
- 2021: The Tempest, Great Expectations adapted by Gale Childs Daly, and Every Brilliant Thing by Duncan Macmillan and Jonny Donahoe.
- 2022: Twelfth Night, The African Company Presents Richard III by Carlyle Brown, Always... Patsy Cline, and All the Town's a Stage: A Winona Story, an original production created and performed in collaboration with members of the community
- 2023: As You Like It, the world premiere of Imbroglio by Melissa Maxwell, and The Winter's Tale
- 2024: Hamlet and Much Ado About Nothing
- 2025: Romeo and Juliet and The Comedy of Errors
- 2026: A Midsummer Night's Dream and Pericles

The following Shakespeare shows have yet to be produced mainstage by the Great River Shakespeare Festival:

- Antony and Cleopatra
- Coriolanus
- Henry IV, Part 2
- Henry VI
- Henry VIII
- King John
- Measure for Measure
- The Two Noble Kinsmen
- Timon of Athens
- Titus Andronicus
- Troilus and Cressida

== Performances by acting apprentices and production interns ==
- 2004: As You Like It
- 2005: Twelfth Night
- 2006: Cymbeline
- 2007: Julius Caesar
- 2008: Pericles
- 2009: Hamlet
- 2010: Titus Andronicus
- 2011: King Lear
- 2012: All's Well that Ends Well
- 2013: Macbeth
- 2014: Troilus and Cressida
- 2015: King John
- 2016: Coriolanus
- 2017: Henry VI
- 2018: The Merchant of Venice
- 2019: Love's Labour's Lost.
- 2021: Romeo and Juliet
- 2025: The Two Gentlemen of Verona, a special residency of the graduate acting company of the University of Tennessee Knoxville

== Shakespeare for Young Actors ==
Shakespeare for Young Actors, abbreviated as SYA, is a two-week workshop for students in grades 7-12. The program aims to teach students skills used in the professional acting industry, particularly in the understanding, analysis, and interpretation of Shakespearean texts (see scansion).

This program began in 2010, and has performed the following shows:

- 2010: Henry V
- 2011: The Winter's Tale
- 2012: As You Like It
- 2013: Romeo & Juliet
- 2014: The Tempest
- 2015: Macbeth
- 2016: The Comedy of Errors
- 2017: Hamlet*
- 2018: Twelfth Night*
- 2019: Henry V*. Additionally, the festival hosted a performance of The Two Gentlemen of Verona done by the visiting group Shakespearean Youth Theatre.
- 2020: Shakespeare Everywhere (digital showcase)*
- 2021: As You Like It*
- 2022: A Midsummer Night's Dream*
- 2023: Richard III*
- 2024: King Lear*
- 2025: Twelfth Night
- 2026: Scenes from various Shakespeare plays

*Included designs by Shakespeare for Young Designers

== Shakespeare for Young Filmmakers short films ==
- 2018: Cassandra
- 2021: Bearly Beloved
- 2022: Quack

== Response to COVID-19 ==
Due to the Coronavirus pandemic, the 2020 season was cancelled. Many events took place online via Zoom, including Shakespeare for Young Actors & Designers' presentation Shakespeare Everywhere. These online events are sometimes referred to as "season 16½". Additionally, this postponement/cancellation caused a shift in the naming of each season; before the pandemic, seasons were referred to by number (ex. season 15 of GRSF), and are now more commonly named after the year in which the season takes place (ex. the 2024 season of GRSF).

The shows slated for 2020 were instead performed in the 2021 season. This season took place almost entirely outdoors; this decision was made in January 2021, before the restrictions around indoor gatherings were eased. The festival's performances took place in Levee Park, a public park next to the Mississippi River, on a stage built specifically for the season. Several performances were cancelled due to weather concerns (including air quality problems due to smoke from eastern wildfires).
