= Judith A. Ramaley =

American biologist and academic administrator

14th President of Winona State University
- In office 2005 – May 16, 2012
- Preceded by: Darrell W. Krueger
- Succeeded by: Scott Olson

President of the University of Vermont
- In office July 1, 1997 – June 30, 2001
- Preceded by: Thomas P. Salmon
- Succeeded by: Daniel Mark Fogel

President of Portland State University
- In office 1990–1997
- Preceded by: Roger Edgington
- Succeeded by: Daniel O. Bernstine

Personal details
- Born: 1941 California, United States
- Died: August 24, 2026
- Education: Swarthmore College; University of California, Los Angeles; Indiana University

Judith Aitken Ramaley (1941 – August 24, 2026) was an American biologist and academic administrator who served as president of several colleges and universities. She was the president of Winona State University from 2005 to 2012. Ramaley coined the STEM acronym (science, technology, engineering, and mathematics) in 2001, when she served as director of the National Science Foundation’s Education and Human Resources Division.

== Biography ==
Ramaley was born in 1941. She earned a bachelor's degree from Swarthmore College in 1963, a Ph.D. from the University of California, Los Angeles in 1966, and pursued postdoctoral studies at Indiana University. Ramaley began her career at the University of Nebraska–Lincoln where she rose to assistant vice president for academic affairs. She served as the 6th president of the Association for Women in Science from 1978 to 1980.

In 1982, Ramaley became the chief academic officer at the State University of New York at Albany, also serving as executive vice president for academic affairs. Ramaley was the executive vice chancellor at the University of Kansas from 1987 to 1990 before stepping in as acting president at SUNY Albany. In the fall of 1990, she became the president of Portland State University until 1997, and from 1997 to 2001 she served as president of the University of Vermont.

Ramaley resigned from the presidency of the University of Vermont after less than four years, following a hazing scandal involving the hockey team and a union drive by the faculty.

Ramaley later became Assistant Director, Education and Human Resources Directorate (EHR), at the National Science Foundation. On July 18, 2005 Ramaley began her service as the 14th president of Winona State University in Winona, Minnesota.

Upon her resignation from the Winona State presidency she became a distinguished professor of public service at Portland State University. She died on August 24, 2026.

Academic offices
Preceded by Roger Edgington	President of Portland State University; 1990–1997	Succeeded by Daniel O. Bernstine
Preceded by Thomas P. Salmon	President of the University of Vermont; July 1, 1997 – June 30, 2001	Succeeded by Daniel Mark Fogel
Preceded by Darrell W. Krueger	President of Winona State University; 2005 – May 16, 2012	Succeeded by Scott R. Olson
