= Kenneth Janz =

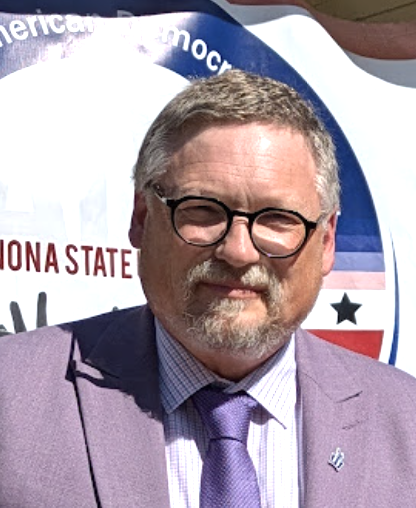
- Janz in 2024

16th President of Winona State University
- Incumbent
- Assumed office March 20, 2024
- Preceded by: Scott Olson

Personal details
- Education: Dickinson State University; Indiana State University; North Dakota State University

Kenneth Janz is an American educator currently serving as president of Winona State University.

== Biography ==
Janz attended Dickinson State University, received a Doctorate from Indiana State University, and a master's degree from North Dakota State University. After graduating, he took a job as a high school computer science teacher in West Fargo, North Dakota, and became an IT support person from 1993-1998.

=== Professional career ===
Janz served at Indiana State University from 1998-2008. Janz was Associate Vice President of Academic Affairs at Winona State University from 2008-2023, also serving as CIO and dean of the library. Hen he became interim president in August 2023 following Scott Olson's resignation. On March 20, 2024, he was officially appointed as university president. His inauguration was on November 1, 2024. He took office with the university dealing with a budget deficit and issues resulting from the COVID-19 pandemic, alongside a historic increase in student enrollment. Janz championed 'Winona 2035', a program to increase student equity and quality of life.

=== Personal life ===
Janz is a player of Dungeons and Dragons.
