= Jesse Fonda Millspaugh =

American educator

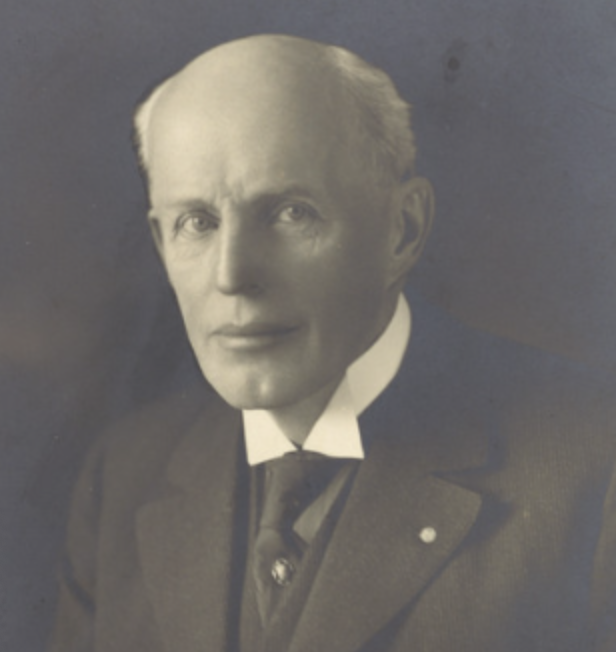
- Millspaugh in 1918

4th Principal of California Normal School
- In office 1904–1917
- Preceded by: Edward. T. Pierce
- Succeeded by: Ernest Carroll Moore

5th President of Winona Normal School
- In office December 8, 1898 – April 8, 1904
- Preceded by: Irwin Shepard
- Succeeded by: Guy E. Maxwell

Personal details
- Born: June 18, 1855 Battle Creek, Michigan
- Died: December 12, 1919 (aged 64) Los Angeles, California
- Spouse: Mary Clark Parsons (m. 1886)

Jesse Fonda Millspaugh (June 18, 1855 – December 12, 1919) was an American educator. He served as 5th president of the Winona Normal School, now Winona State University, and later as 4th principal of the California Normal School, now UCLA.

== Biography ==
Millspaugh was born on June 18, 1855, in Battle Creek, Michigan to Jacob and Mary Ann (Decker) Millspaugh. He was orphaned at age four. He married his wife, Mary Clark Parsons, on August 7, 1886, in Salt Lake City. He had two children with her, Winnefred and Helen. He was a member of Delta Upsilon and Phi Beta Kappa.

=== Education ===
Millspaugh attended rural schools in the winters of his childhood. By the age of fourteen, he began studying algebra and latin. By his graduation from High School, he was tutoring latin. He received a BA, and then an MA, from the University of Michigan, receiving the latter in 1879. In 1883 he graduated from the University of Pennsylvania with an MD. Due to his own health, he would never begin the practice of medicine, suffering from rheumatism. He decided to make a career in education instead.

=== Educator ===
Millspaugh while president at Winona, 1903

In 1884, he moved to Utah, and became principal of the Salt Lake Collegiate Institute. He emphasized rigid discipline and a demanding curriculum, believing this would prepare students for professional careers. Though not a member of the Church of Jesus Christ of Latter-day Saints (LDS Church), he would gain a reputation as a tolerant administrator, who was willing to work with the LDS Church. In 1890, he became the first superintendent for Salt Lake City's schools. He was in charge of organizing the area's first public school system. When he arrived in Utah, there were 23 school systems within Salt Lake City itself, and the instructors lacked any significant teaching qualifications. Millspaugh created a unified curriculum, the construction of twenty new buildings, new equipment, and the hiring of a new staff. The new staff proved unpopular with the old staff, who regarded the newcomers as intruders.

In 1898, with the endorsement of Charles A. Morey, he was elected as president of Winona Normal School, now known as Winona State University. In 1899, he moved to Winona. During his tenure, he would focus on elementary education. He also stressed the importance of cultural education and student activities. He was the first school president to advocate for a model school. In 1902, he began pushing for the construction of a gymnasium and library to be constructed, which would be built following his departure. In 1904, he resigned from that post to become principal of California Normal School. He believed that California would be a better opportunity for his career, and that California had a better climate. His last visit to Winona was in May 1916.

He would serve in that position until 1917, when he retired, due to poor health. He would stay involved in the school as 'President Emeritus'. He died on 1919 December 19, 1919, in Hollywood, Los Angeles, California. He died of pneumonia. He would be honored by Millspaugh Hall in 1914. The building has since been destroyed, but existed as late as 1928. It has since been replaced with the Los Angeles City College Community Services Extension building.
