= Robert Hanson (academic) =

Robert A. Hanson

11th President of Winona State University
- In office August 1977 – April 8, 1983
- Preceded by: Robert DuFresne
- Succeeded by: Thomas Stark

Personal details
- Born: May 28, 1927 Hector, Minnesota
- Died: January 9, 2006 (aged 78) Fargo, North Dakota
- Spouse: Helen Lofgren
- Education: University of Minnesota

Robert A. Hanson (May 28, 1927 – January 9, 2006) was an American educator who served as president of Winona State University from 1977 to 1983.

== Biography ==
Hanson was born to Henry and Greta Hanson on May 28, 1927 in Hector, Minnesota. He graduated from Hector High School in 1946, then served in the Army Air Corps. On December 26, 1948, he married Helen Lofgren. He received a doctorates degree from the University of Minnesota. After graduating he became an agriculture education teacher at Danube High School. In 1959, He moved to higher education at the West Central School of Agriculture and then to Moorhead State University, where he served as Vice President for Academic Affairs. While in Moorhead he served as Chairman of the Board of Education, re-instating kindergarten, building a new high school, and a new vocational technical college.

=== At Winona ===
In 1977, Hanson became president of Winona State University. Hanson's education philosophy stressed liberal arts and humanities. In early 1979, the Student Senate proposed a new general education requirement standard. After both the students and staff strongly opposed the proposal, Hanson gave the students and staff until May 1 to submit alternative proposals. Hanson made his decision in September, choosing to only make smaller changes to ensure students would not be able to avoid taking humanities classes.

=== Health crisis and later life ===
On December 17, 1981, he suffered a brain aneurysm during a stroke. Helen Popovich was named as acting president while he was in the hospital. Despite a complete physical recovery, Hanson was left with memory issues. While in recovery, Hanson moved to Florida. He announced his resignation in March 1983, and left office on April 8. He moved back to the Fargo-Moorhead area in 1989. He died in 2006.
