= Guy E. Maxwell =

American educator (1870–1939)

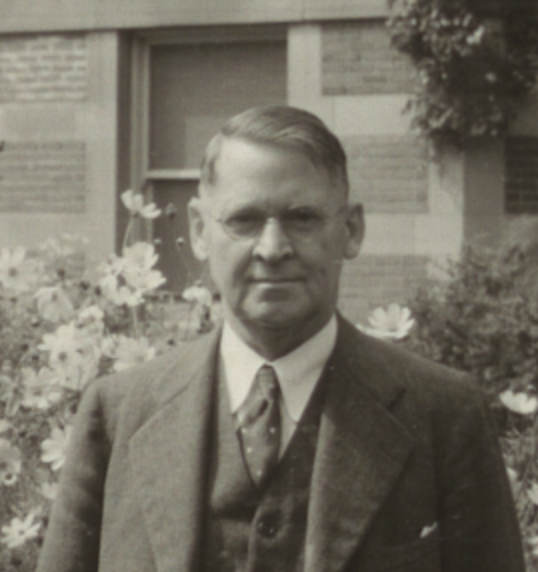
- Maxwell in the 1920s

6th President of Winona State Teachers' College
- In office April 8, 1904 – January 3, 1939
- Preceded by: Jesse Fonda Millspaugh
- Succeeded by: Arthur T. French (Interim); Oscar Myking Mehus

Personal details
- Born: September 10, 1870 Mason County, Illinois
- Died: January 3, 1939 (aged 68) Winona, Minnesota
- Party: Republican
- Spouse: Jeannette Robertson Evans (m.1895/6)
- Parents: Henry Clay Maxwell (father); Mary Ewers Maxwell (mother)
- Education: Hamline University; Teachers College, Columbia University

Guy Everett Maxwell (September 10, 1870 – January 3, 1939) was an American educator who served from 1904 to 1939 as Winona State University's sixth president. He is its longest-serving president.

== Biography ==
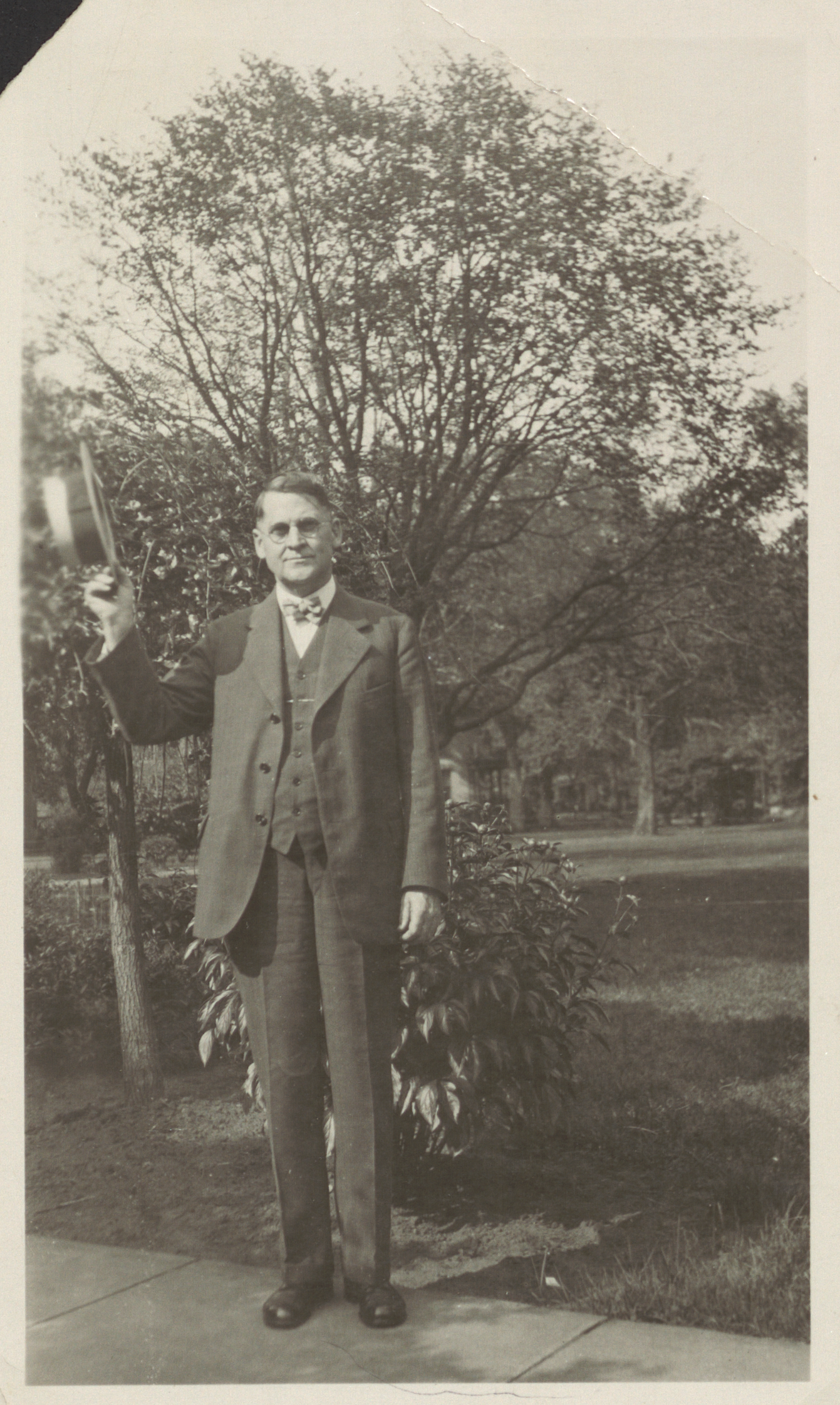
Guy E. Maxwell

Maxwell was born on a farm in Mason County, Illinois, on September 10, 1870. He moved to Appleton, Minnesota, in 1879, graduated from Hamline University in 1893, and taught in public schools until 1898. In 1895/6, he married Jeannette Evans. In 1900, he graduated from Teachers College, Columbia University. He taught at Winona State University (then the Winona Normal School) from 1900 to 1904.

=== Presidency ===
Upon assuming the presidency of the school in 1904, Maxwell's priorities were first the expansion of campus. During his tenure, he would renovate the Old Main Hall, built the first dormitories, the library building, and the Model School building. In 1908, he introduced reforms to the school operation, introducing elective classes and liberalizing curriculums. In the 1910s, he would take further steps, introducing the first three-year courses in 1913.

Maxwell oversaw two name changes while in office. When he took office, the school was called Winona Normal School. It became Winona State Normal School in 1905 and Winona State Teachers College in 1921. The name changes were a result of the Minnesota Legislature's growing investment in elevating the school in the higher education system, in close collaboration with Maxwell. Internal changes under his direction included issuing four-year degrees, making high school graduation mandatory for admission, and charging tuition, beginning in 1933.

Maxwell was dedicated to strict discipline and the expansion of the university. He made graduating seniors remove dandelions from the campus before graduation, believing it instilled in them a "proper sense of humility". Maxwell invested in the school's music program, notably supporting the Edstrom brothers, who founded Hal Leonard.

Maxwell died on January 3, 1939, while in office, of pneumonia.

He was later described by historian Peter Henderson as being uninterested in intellectual affairs, far more concerned with moral character and institutional stability. Following his death, it was discovered that he likely helped pay college fees for a number of needy students.

== Legacy ==
Maxwell is the namesake for Maxwell Hall and Maxwell Field.
