= Thomas Stark =

12th President of Winona State University
- In office July 1, 1983 – August 21, 1988
- Preceded by: Robert Hanson; Helen Popovich (acting)
- Succeeded by: Jack Kane (Interim); Darrell W. Krueger

Personal details
- Born: March 18, 1935 Duluth, Minnesota
- Died: August 21, 1988 (aged 53) Fargo, North Dakota
- Spouse: Judy
- Education: University of Minnesota, Duluth; Michigan State University

Thomas Francis Stark (March 18, 1935 – August 21, 1988) was an American educator who served as President of Winona State University. He died in office in 1988.

== Biography ==
Stark was born on March 18, 1935, in Duluth, Minnesota. He attended the University of Minnesota, Duluth, and then had various teaching positions in Two Harbors, Minnesota and Grand Rapids, Minnesota while he worked on higher degrees. In 1965, he graduated from Michigan State University with a PhD. In 1966, he became superintendent at Grand Rapids. In 1974, he became superintendent at Mankato, Minnesota. In 1980, he began working at Mankato State University.

== At Winona ==
Stark succeeded Robert Hanson as president of Winona State University in 1983. One of Stark's first action was to re-hire staff fired by acting president Helen Popovich immediately before he took office, citing multiple retirements and an improved financial situation for the university. In 1984, Stark responded to declining enrollment with his '37-point plan' which would massively increase recruitment efforts. He also implemented administrative reforms. Eight new positions were proposed, with Stark approving five, notably disapproving of the proposed position of vice president. Stark led an initiative to create an engineering program with a dedicated building. The program would be created, and the dedicated building would be named Stark Hall in his honor.

On August 21, 1988, Stark died in office at the age of 53. He died of a heart attack while attending a family wedding in North Dakota. The memorial service was held on-campus, on October 3, 1988.
