= Irwin Shepard =

American Civil War Medal of Honor recipient (1843–1916)

First Sergeant Irwin Shepard
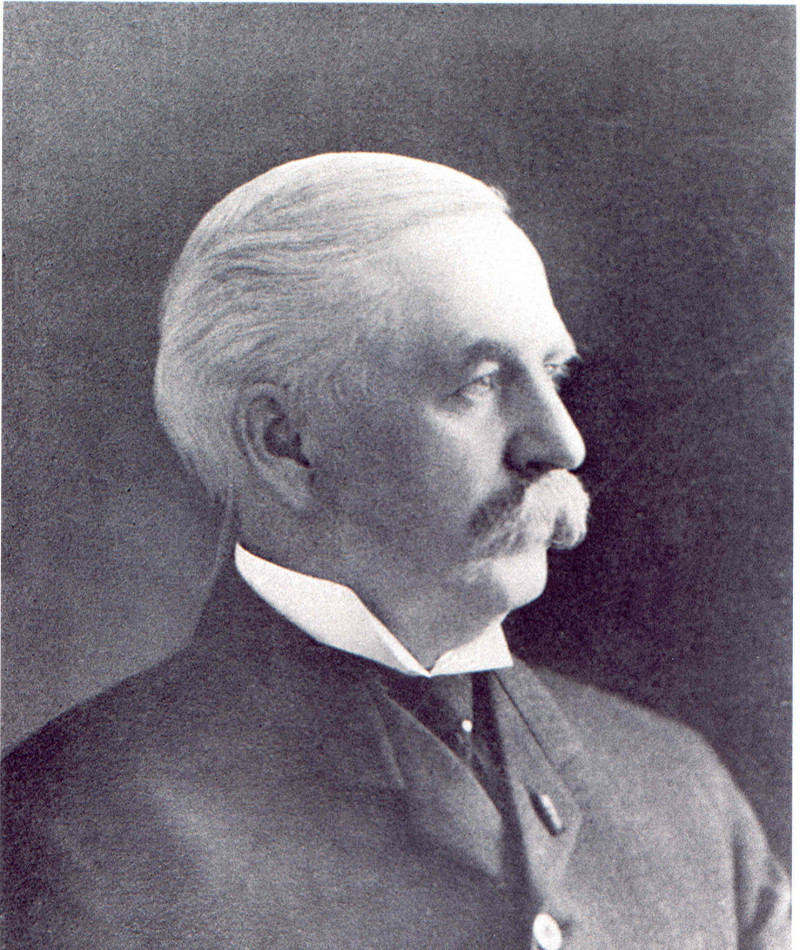
- Shepard in 1865
- Born: 5 July 1843; Skaneateles, New York
- Died: 17 April 1916 (aged 72); Winona, Minnesota
- Burial place: Woodlawn Cemetery, Winona, Minnesota
- Education: Olivet College
- Children: Elmer I. Shepard; Ernest E. Shepard
- Military career
- Allegiance: United States (Union)
- Branch: Army
- Service years: 1861–1865
- Rank: First sergeant
- Units: Company E, 17th Michigan Volunteer Infantry
- Awards: Medal of Honor

4th President of Winona Normal School
- In office June 24, 1879 – August 16, 1898
- Preceded by: Charles A. Morey (As Principal)
- Succeeded by: Jesse Fonda Millspaugh

Irwin Shepard (5 July 1843 – 17 April 1916) was an American Civil War Medal of Honor recipient and 4th President of the Winona Normal School, now Winona State University. He was first sergeant in the United States Army. On November 20, 1863, he volunteered to join a group of men who were tasked with burning down several farm buildings that Confederate sharpshooters were using to shoot at Union units near Knoxville, Tennessee. For the successful completion of this task, Shepard was awarded the Medal of Honor on 3 August 1897.

== Biography ==
Shepard was born in Skaneateles, New York, to Luman Shepard and Betsy L. Pangburn. He was of mixed English (father's side) and Dutch (mother's side) ancestry. When Shepard was 13, his family moved to Chelsea, Michigan. In 1859, he entered the Michigan State Normal School in Ypsilanti.

=== Military Service ===
Shepard enlisted in the Army as a private in 1861 and served with Company E of the 17th Michigan Volunteer Infantry. He was soon promoted to the rank of corporal. On 20 November 1863, Corporal Shepard volunteered for a mission to burn the buildings of the Judge Reese farm near Fort Sanders, Knoxville, Tennessee, which the Confederates were using to shoot at Union troops. A Confederate sniper shooting at Shepard's group from above resulted in orders to retreat. However, Shepard stayed behind and ensured the complete destruction of the buildings. This action led to his Medal of Honor. Shepard also fought in the battles of South Mountain, Antietam, Brandy Station, Fredericksburg, Green River, Vicksburg, Jackson, Loudan, and the Wilderness. He was wounded at the Battle of the Wilderness but eventually recovered.

Shepard's Medal of Honor citation reads:

The President of the United States of America, in the name of Congress, takes pleasure in presenting the Medal of Honor to Corporal Irwin Shepard, United States Army, for extraordinary heroism on 20 November 1863, while serving with Company E, 17th Michigan Infantry, in action at Fort Sanders, Knoxville, Tennessee. Having voluntarily accompanied a small party to destroy buildings within the enemy's lines, whence sharpshooters had been firing, disregarded an order to retire, Corporal Shepard remained and completed the firing of the buildings, thus insuring their total destruction; this at the imminent risk of his life from the fire of the advancing enemy.

— R. A. Alger, Secretary of War

=== Educator ===
After the war, Shepard received A.B., A.M., and PhD degrees from Olivet College in Olivet, Michigan. After graduating, Shepard became the Superintendent of Schools in Charles City, Iowa, in 1871. He married Mary Bassett Elmer in 1871 and fathered three children, of which two boys survived to adulthood, with one of them, Elmer, eventually becoming an assistant professor of mathematics at Williams College in Williamstown, Massachusetts.

Shepard moved to Winona, Minnesota, in 1875 to become the principal of Winona High School. In 1878, he was appointed Superintendent of the Winona Public School System.

In 1879, he was elected Principal of the Winona State Normal School. The title was changed to 'President' in 1880. That year, he established the first kindergarten program west of the Mississippi River and the first training course for kindergarten teachers west of the Mississippi. Finally, he established a "normal school diploma" that granted teachers the qualification to teach in the normal school system. His presidency would also see the substantial expansion of the English department.

Shepard would depart from his predecessor, Charles A. Morey's philosophy in a number of ways. Morey's focus on rigorous high standards and discipline would be reformed in favor of a philosophy prioritizing efficiency, and "kindly reason." The relaxing of Morey's policies, coupled with the school gaining prestige and recognition, would see enrollment climb by 150% by 1886. As classes became crowded, Shepard once again raised admission standards. Plans for the expansion of the campus began to be drawn up in 1894. In 1898, he resigned from the presidency.

In 1893, Shepard became the secretary of the National Educational Association. He was also a member of the John Ball Post No. 45 G.A.R., Department of Minnesota. He died on 17 April 1916 in Winona and is buried in Woodlawn Cemetery in Winona.
