= Scott Olson (academic) =

6th Chancellor of the Minnesota State Colleges and Universities system
- Incumbent
- Assumed office August 1, 2023
- Preceded by: Devinder Malhotra

15th President of Winona State University
- In office July 16, 2012 – July 31, 2023
- Preceded by: Connie Gores (Interim); Judith A. Ramaley
- Succeeded by: Kenneth Janz

Personal details
- Born: 1959/1960
- Spouse: Kelley
- Education: Northwestern University

Scott Robert Olson (born 1959/1960) is the chancellor of the Minnesota State Colleges and Universities system (Minnstate). He previously served at 15th president of Winona State University.

== Biography ==
Olson grew up in northeastern Minneapolis. He received his PhD from Northwestern University. He won an Emmy Award and a Cine Golden Eagle Award in 2004 for his 2002 documentary 'Squeakers'.

Olson served nine years as provost and vice president for academic and student affairs at Minnesota State University, Mankato. He spent one year at the Minnstate system office in St. Paul as interim vice chancellor for academic and student affairs. He served as Dean of the College of Communication, Information, and Media at Ball State University and as a faculty member at Central Connecticut State University.

=== Presidency ===
Olson served as president of Winona State University from 2012-2023. During his presidency, the campus installed solar panels, and invested in the renovation of multiple buildings on campus. In 2017, Olson supported student protesters marching on campus to protest Donald Trump. During his tenure, he would sometimes be a guest DJ in the campus radio station, KQAL.

=== Chancellorship ===
In 2023, he was chosen to become Chancellor of Minnstate. He explicitly promised no policy deviation from his predecessor, Devinder Malhotra. He champions his "equity 2030" plan to increase college affordability. His appointment was supported by the Student Senate and WSU College Democrats. In 2025, he worked with State Senator Melisa López Franzen to encourage the Minnesota legislature to increase education funding, with Olson emphasizing the large number of educated workers, especially in trades, that the Minnstate system can produce for the Minnesotan economy.

== Bibliography ==
- Hollywood Planet (1999)
