= Nels Minne =

American academic administrator

- Minne in 1967

9th President of Winona State College
- In office May 18, 1944 – January 1, 1967
- Preceded by: Oscar Myking Mehus
- Succeeded by: Robert DuFresne

Personal details
- Born: December 6, 1901 Wisconsin
- Died: June 2, 1991 (aged 89) Winona County, Minnesota
- Spouse: Lenore
- Education: St. Olaf College; University of Wisconsin; University of Oslo

Nels Berter Rangvold Minne (also spelled Minné) (December 6, 1901 – June 2, 1991) was a U.S educator from Minnesota who served as president of Winona State University (WSU), then known as Winona State Teachers' College and later Winona State College.

== Early life and education ==
Minne was born on December 6, 1901. He graduated from St. Olaf College and later attended the University of Wisconsin.

== Career ==
He became a chemistry professor at WSU in 1932. He was hired during the Great Depression, and considered himself lucky to have a job. Of his graduating class of 25, only 3 would have a job after graduating. During his tenure as a professor, he would expand to teach public speaking and debate.

=== President ===
He was named president of the WSU in 1944. At the time, there were only ~200 students, largely due to the ongoing Second World War. The legislature was considering shutting down the school. A focus of his administration would becoming increasing the number of students. In 1946, much of the staff returned from their post-war military leave, and the expected flood of veterans in attendance began that fall. In 1949, while visiting St. Cloud, he was hospitalized with a bronchial condition. In 1950, he took a six month research trip to Norway, visiting schools and homes there, such as the University of Oslo.

While president, the college experienced a building boom, with 12 buildings completed under his tenure. In 1957, the name of the school was changed from Winona State Teachers' College to Winona State College. In 1965, freshman enrollment increased 80% in one year. As the counterculture of the 1960s made its way to the traditionally conservative campus, Minne would minimally reform campus policy carefully to meet the changing social standards among the youth. One social issue raised to him in 1964, was the unequal pay between male and female faculty. Attorneys, legislators, and college board members, began to get involved as the issue grew in importance. Minne chose to take no action, declaring his intention if retirement, and that his successor would resolve the situation. As the 1960s continued, Minne's fiscal and social conservatism became more unpopular. Students' demanded greater recognition of freedom of speech in school, and Minne was reluctant to make changes, notably unsuccessfully attempting to undermine the passing of a new college constitution.

On January 1, 1967, he retired, with enrollment now at 3,119. Upon the announcement of his upcoming retirement, he received thanks for his service from Hubert Humphrey. He also received thanks from John A. Blatnik and Al Quie. It has been alleged that his unpopularity got bad enough that he was outright fired by the state college board. This claim remains unproven.

== Legacy ==
In 1970, Minne hall was named for him. The building was officially dedicated in 1973.
