= Krueger Library =

Darrell W. Krueger Library
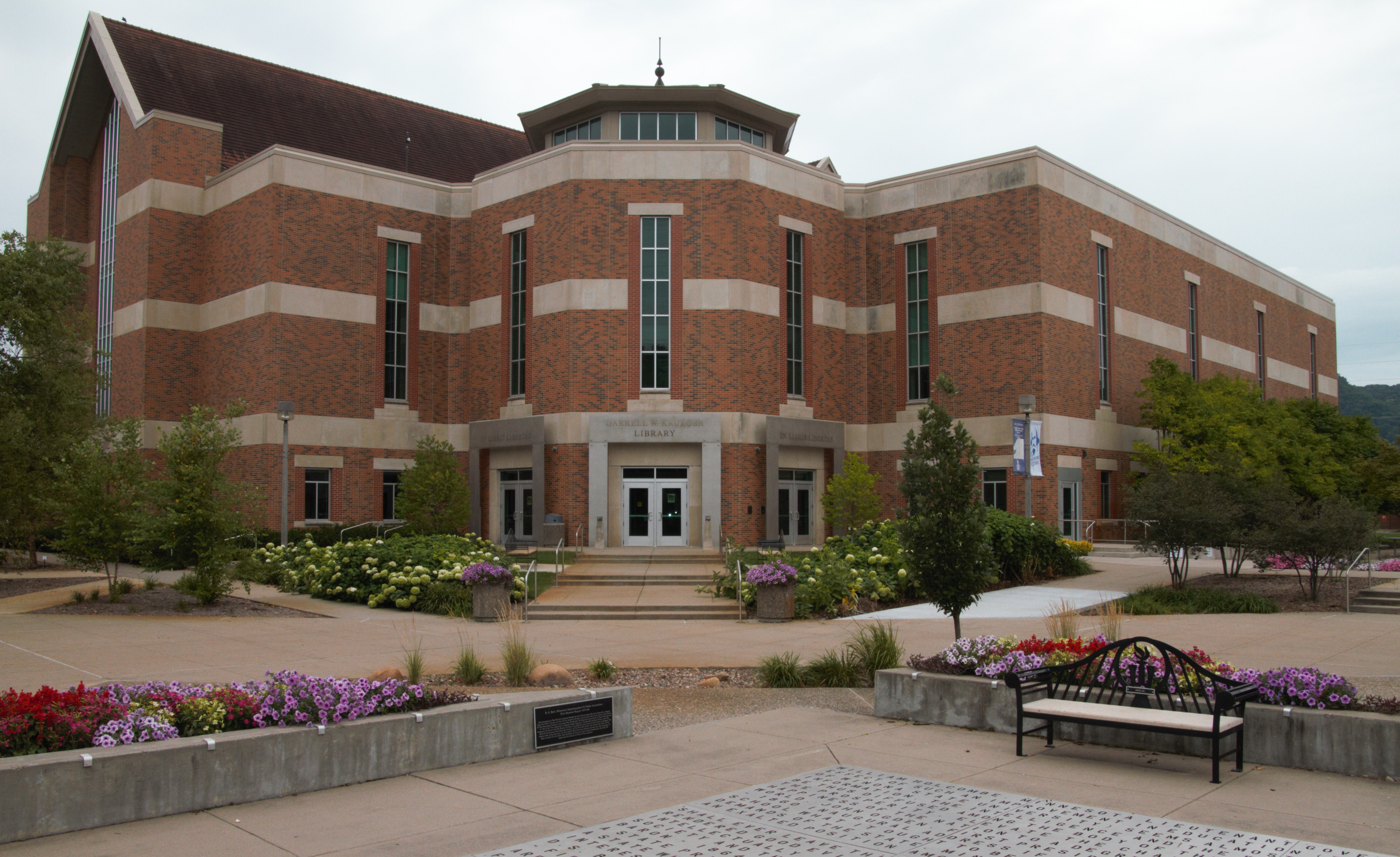
- The library in August 2018
- Former names: New Library

General information
- Location: 175 W Mark St., Winona, MN 55987, Winona, MN
- Coordinates: 44.046174°N 91.643755°W
- Construction started: October 1997
- Opening: June 1999

Technical details
- Floor area: 108,000 sq. ft.

Website
- www.winona.edu/library

Darrell W. Krueger Library, commonly known as Krueger Library, is the center of research, discovery, and creative output at Winona State University (WSU). The library serves more than 10,000 students, faculty, and staff in the WSU community, residents in the city of Winona, Minnesota, and the greater Southeastern Minnesota region. It is a United States Federal depository library.

== Library History ==
The library began in a temporary wooden building, built in 1860. It was moved to Old Main, where it was from 1869 to 1909. In 1909, it was moved to Ogden Hall. In 1939, it was moved to Maxwell Library (now Maxwell Hall), which served students in the historic core of campus. The location that is now the library was previous tennis courts. By the 1990s, Maxwell Library was inadequate for the number of students attending, and lagged behind in technology. President Darrell W. Krueger decided to prioritize the construction of a new library, with Gene Pelowski credited for securing funding from the Minnesota legislature. When the WSU community celebrated the completion of the "New Library" in 1999, situated on the opposite side of campus, then-president Krueger spoke and then-governor Jesse Ventura was in attendance. It was built with the "Laptop University" in mind, with over 1,800 network ports, wireless internet access, and over ten high speed duplexing laser printers throughout the building.

The library was dedicated to President Krueger upon his retirement, on April 29, 2005. Governor Tim Pawlenty spoke at the rededication ceremony.

== Building Construction and Library Services ==
The library has three floors with over 250,000 books and e-books, thousands of periodical titles, and over 140 online databases. The library offers: public terminals for internet access and printing; research computers with access to the catalog; and WSU database access to anyone in the library building; forty-two high end multimedia computer towers, both Macintosh and PC platforms are supported. Users can borrow laptops, power and network cords, webcams, media carts which include a wide screen TV and DVD/VCR, and webcams (for WSU students only). It also has six laptop workstations for scanning. Students can study and work on group projects in study room located on all three floors of the building.

== Library Athenaeum ==
Krueger Library Athenaeum

The Athenaeum hosts events that explore and enhance the intellectual life of the university and the region. These events could include lectures, readings, discussions, seminars, performance arts, and other educational experiences.

By bringing together scholars, performing artists, students, community members, and other interested people for intellectual discussion and the sharing of cultural experiences, the Athenaeum reflects the importance the university places on the humanities, the arts, and the sciences.

In 2016, the Athenaeum became a podcast. The Athenaeum ended in 2018. More information and podcast recordings are found in WSU Library's OpenRiver Digital Repository.
