= Robert DuFresne =

American educator (1921–2015)

- DuFresne in 1967

10th President of Winona State University
- In office January 1, 1967 – 1977
- Preceded by: Nels Minne
- Succeeded by: Robert Hanson

Personal details
- Born: October 29, 1921 Brainerd, Minnesota
- Died: November 17, 2015 (aged 94) Winona, Minnesota
- Party: Democratic (DFL)
- Spouse(s): Betty DuFresne; Barbara DuFresne
- Children: 1
- Parent(s): Joseph DuFresne; Margaret (née Gleeson) DuFresne
- Education: Brainerd Community College; St. Cloud State University; University of Colorado; University of North Dakota

Robert A. DuFresne (October 29, 1921 – November 17, 2015) was an American educator who served as the tenth president of Winona State University from 1967 to 1977.

== Early life and education ==
DuFresne was born on October 29, 1921, in Brainerd, Minnesota, to Joseph and Margaret (Gleeson) DuFresne. He graduated from Brainerd High School in 1939 and entered the United States Navy at the outset of World War II, serving in naval aviation as a gunner aboard torpedo bombers.

In 1946 he enrolled at Brainerd Community College, where he earned an associate's degree. He graduated from St. Cloud State University in 1950, and went on to take graduate degrees at the University of Colorado and the University of North Dakota, receiving his doctorate in education from the latter.

== Educator ==
After graduating, DuFresne taught in the public schools in Austin. Starting in 1959 he served as an associate professor at Mankato State University, and as a visiting lecturer for Drake University, Troy State University and Western Washington University. In 1964 he became head of the education division at Kearney State College in Nebraska.

On January 1, 1967 he became president of Winona State College, succeeding Nels Minne. Like his predecessor, DuFresne focused much of his tenure on the physical expansion of the campus. Memorial Hall, Minne Hall, and Sheehan Hall were built during his presidency; Kryzsko Commons was expanded twice, Maxwell, Morey, and Shepard halls underwent major renovation, and Phelps Hall was converted from a laboratory elementary school into an academic classroom building. Among them was the Performing Arts Center, which opened in 1971 and was named the Robert A. DuFresne Performing Arts Center in 2019.

Enrollment grew from 3,500 students in 1967 to about 4,800 a decade later. DuFresne introduced the college's first marketing campaign and reinvigorated its External Studies program, increasing the number of non-traditional-age students from 30 to more than 600 in a single year. New programs in education administration, paralegal studies, business administration, computer science, physical therapy and medical technology were added to the catalog, along with a major expansion of the nursing program. Women's athletics were reorganized following the implementation of Title IX, and the international student program was greatly expanded. In 1973, he faced a minor scandal when it was alleged he had used university funds to pay for his personal membership of the Winona Country Club. His name was cleared following testimony from the Country Club itself and the State College Board.

In 1975 the Minnesota Legislature awarded university designation to the state colleges, and Winona State College became Winona State University.

Campus anti-war activity reached its height in May 1972, after President Richard Nixon announced the resumption of the bombing of North Vietnam. On May 9, students marched from the campus across the city, sat down at the intersection of Broadway and Main Street, and occupied City Hall. Arriving at the scene, DuFresne took a bullhorn and told the students that "Demonstrating is good if it is done in good faith ... if there is no violence." He agreed to march back to campus with the demonstrators on the condition that they left City Hall without incident.

He left the presidency in 1977 to return to teaching and was succeeded by Robert Hanson. The following year the state university board designated him a distinguished service professor, and he continued to teach political science and to coordinate the university's study abroad program in England until his retirement as president emeritus in 1990. He also served as a member of the Board of Regents of St. Mary's University.

== Political career ==
DuFresne served on the Winona City Council for the second ward, and on the board of directors of the Winona Chamber of Commerce. In 1980 he ran for the Minnesota House of Representatives in District 34B as a Democratic–Farmer–Labor candidate. He took all 933 votes cast in the September primary, and lost the November general election with 5,740 votes, or 43.12 percent.

== Personal life ==
DuFresne played golf until the summer of 2015 and was an accomplished tennis player. He sang in a barbershop quartet and played the cello and the harmonica. He traveled widely, visiting the Soviet Union, Mongolia, Norway and Africa.

He was married twice. His first wife, Betty, died before him; he was survived by his second wife, Barbara, and by one son.

== Bibliography ==
- Winona State University: A History of 125 Years (1985)
