= Brinsmade, North Dakota =

- City
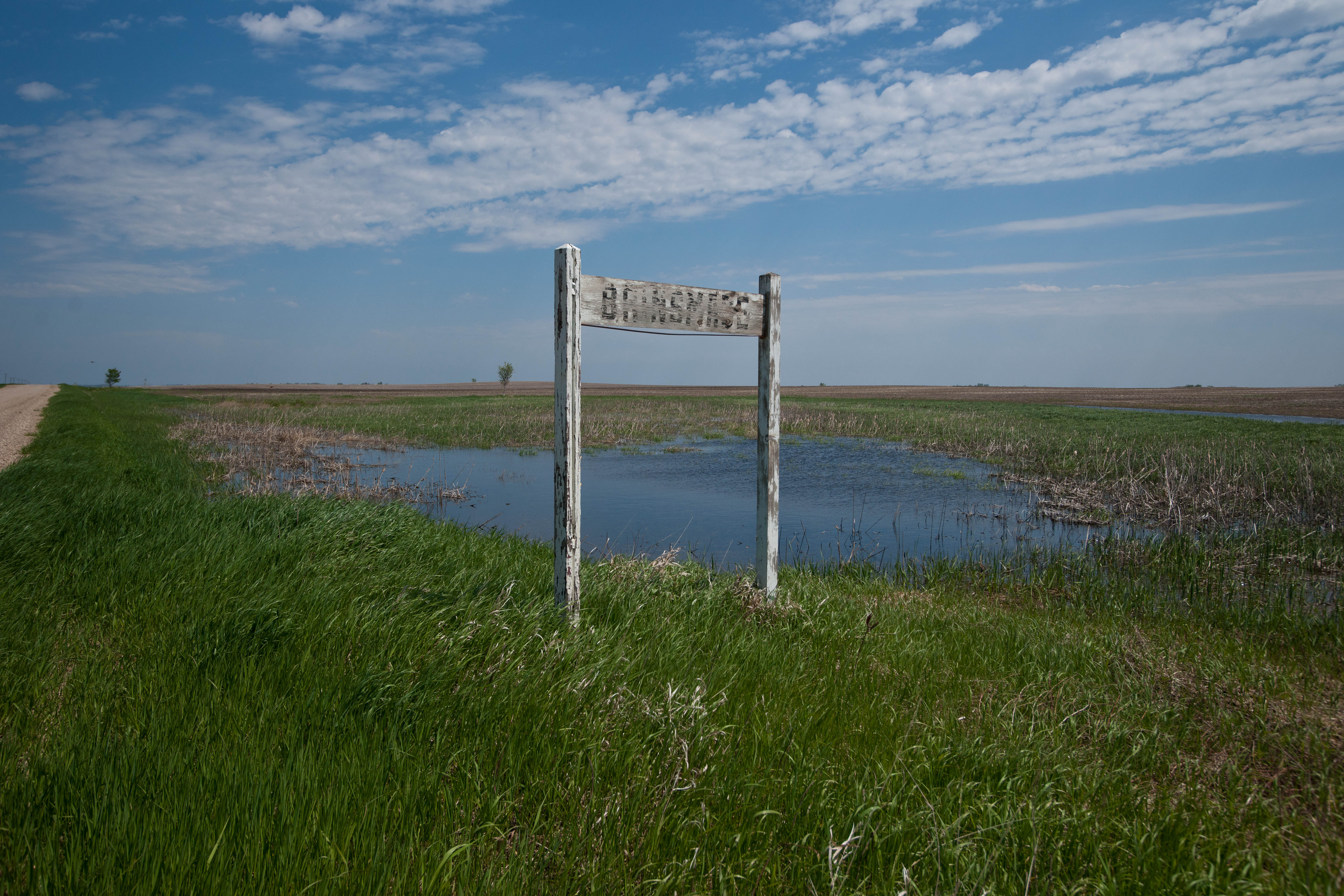
- Sign in Brinsmade

- Location of Brinsmade, North Dakota
- Coordinates: 48°11′02″N 99°19′25″W
- Country: United States
- State: North Dakota
- County: Benson
- Founded: October 7, 1889
- Incorporated: April 4, 1904

Area
  - Total: 0.27 sq mi (0.71 km^{2})
  - Land: 0.27 sq mi (0.71 km^{2})
  - Water: 0 sq mi (0.00 km^{2})
- Elevation: 1,562 ft (476 m)

Population (2020)
  - Total: 30
  - Estimate (2022): 28
  - Density: 109.7/sq mi (42.37/km^{2})
- Time zone: UTC-6 (Central (CST))
  - Summer (DST): UTC-5 (CDT)
- ZIP code: 58351
- Area code: 701
- FIPS code: 38-09460
- GNIS feature ID: 1035942

Brinsmade is a city in Benson County, North Dakota, United States. The population was 30 at the 2020 census. Brinsmade was founded in 1889.

== History ==
Brinsmade was platted on October 7, 1889, when a Northern Pacific Railway branch line was extended from Minnewaukan to Leeds. The village was incorporated on April 4, 1904. The city was named in honor of one Reverend S. Brinsmade.

== Geography ==
According to the United States Census Bureau, the city has a total area of 0.23 square miles (0.60 km^{2}), all land.

== Demographics ==
Historical population
Census	Pop.	Note	%±
1910	203		—
1920	191		−5.9%
1930	199		4.2%
1940	206		3.5%
1950	136		−34.0%
1960	110		−19.1%
1970	36		−67.3%
1980	54		50.0%
1990	21		−61.1%
2000	29		38.1%
2010	35		20.7%
2020	30		−14.3%
2022 (est.)	28		−6.7%
U.S. Decennial Census; 2020 Census

=== 2010 census ===
As of the census of 2010, there were 35 people, 13 households, and 8 families living in the city. The population density was 152.2 inhabitants per square mile (58.8/km^{2}). There were 20 housing units at an average density of 87.0 per square mile (33.6/km^{2}). The racial makeup of the city was 100.0% White.

There were 13 households, of which 46.2% had children under the age of 18 living with them, 38.5% were married couples living together, 15.4% had a female householder with no husband present, 7.7% had a male householder with no wife present, and 38.5% were non-families. 23.1% of all households were made up of individuals, and 7.7% had someone living alone who was 65 years of age or older. The average household size was 2.69 and the average family size was 2.50.

The median age in the city was 33.3 years. 40% of residents were under the age of 18; 0.0% were between the ages of 18 and 24; 31.5% were from 25 to 44; 25.7% were from 45 to 64; and 2.9% were 65 years of age or older. The gender makeup of the city was 42.9% male and 57.1% female.

=== 2000 census ===
As of the census of 2000, there were 29 people, 14 households and 9 families living in the city. The population density was 129.4 inhabitants per square mile (50.0/km^{2}). There were 24 housing units at an average density of 107.1 per square mile (41.4/km^{2}). The racial makeup of the city was 100.00% White.

There were 14 households, of which 21.4% had children under the age of 18 living with them, 64.3% were married couples living together, and 35.7% were non-families. 35.7% of all households were made up of individuals, and none had someone living alone who was 65 years of age or older. The average household size was 2.07 and the average family size was 2.67.

17.2% of the population were under the age of 18, 3.4% from 18 to 24, 37.9% from 25 to 44, 20.7% from 45 to 64, and 20.7% who were 65 years of age or older. The median age was 40 years. For every 100 females, there were 93.3 males. For every 100 females age 18 and over, there were 118.2 males.

The median household income was $30,500 and the median family income was $30,625. Males had a median income of $21,250 versus $11,250 for females. The per capita income for the city was $14,100. None of the population and none of the families were below the poverty line.

== Education ==
It is in Leeds School District 6.
