= Maxwell Field at Warrior Stadium =

Football and soccer stadium in Minnesota, USA

Coordinates: 44.044329°N 91.644634°W

Altra Federal Credit Union Stadium
- Maxwell Field
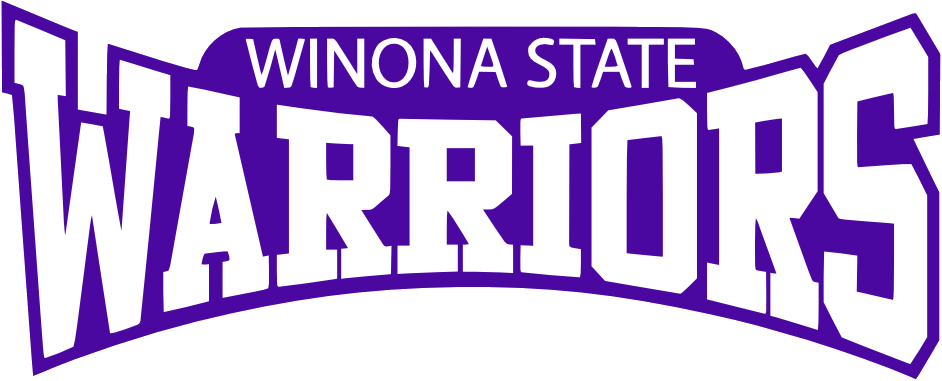

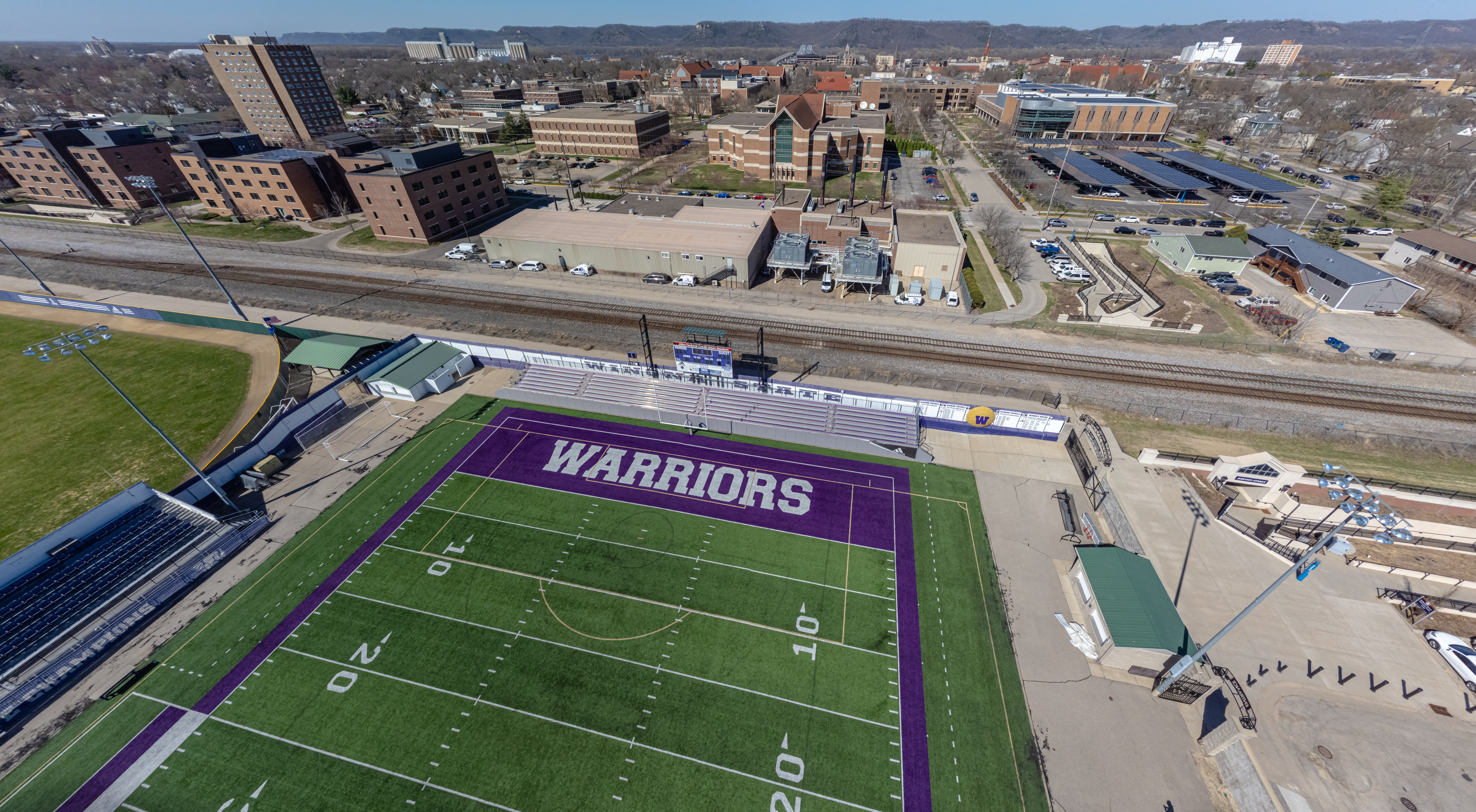
- Aerial view of the stadium in 2023
- Interactive map of Altra Federal Credit Union Stadium
- Full name: Altra Federal Credit Union Stadium
- Former names: Wireless Stadium (2004–2015)
- Address: Winona, Minnesota; U.S.
- Owner: Winona State University
- Operator: WSU Athletics
- Type: Stadium
- Current use: Football; Soccer

Construction
- Opened: 1932
- Years active: 1937-present

Tenants
- Winona State Warriors football, women's soccer

Website
- winonastatewarriors.com/stadium

Top-down view of the stadium

Altra Federal Credit Union Stadium, also known as Maxwell Field, is a stadium at Winona State University in Winona, Minnesota. It has been the home to Winona State Warriors football team since at least the 1937 season, and the women's soccer team since 1995. It was named "Maxwell Field" in honor of then-current Winona State president Guy E. Maxwell. Maxwell Hall, formerly the Maxwell Library, was also named in his honor.

== History ==
In 1932, a practice field for the college's football team was anonymously donated. In 1935, the official standard for a football field were enlarged. Donations from F. S. Bell and S.L. Prentiss made it possible for land to be purchased to bring the field to the new standards. They also requested that the field be named Maxwell Field in honor of President Guy E. Maxwell. When the field was opened with the enlarged size, floodlights were installed along with bleachers with a seating capacity of 2000. The stadium around the field would be completed in October 1950.

On August 5, 2004, Winona State University and Midwest Wireless entered into a ten-year agreement making the name of the football stadium "Maxwell Field at Midwest Wireless Stadium". The agreement called for Midwest Wireless to donate $250,000 to the Winona State University Athletic Department.

The donation made it possible to build a new press box which eight skyboxes, coaches’ offices, meeting rooms, classrooms and locker rooms, as well as room for print, radio and television media outlets.

Maxwell Field was the first on-campus college athletic facility in Minnesota with a corporate sponsor. It was followed in 2009 with the University of Minnesota Golden Gophers' TCF Bank Stadium and fellow conference member Concordia University, Saint Paul's Sea Foam Stadium.

On July 10, 2007, Winona State's Athletic Director Larry Holstad said that due to Alltel Wireless' purchase of Midwest Wireless, the stadium would be renamed.

Due to Verizon Wireless' acquisition of Alltel, Alltel Stadium became known as Verizon Wireless Stadium, the third wireless carrier to have sponsorship of Maxwell Field.

In August 2014, without fanfare, the stadium's name was changed, dropping corporate sponsorship at the completion of the ten year sponsorship.

In September 2015, WSU entered a new partnership with Altra Federal Credit Union, renaming the stadium 'Altra Federal Credit Union Stadium.'
