= Robert A. DuFresne Performing Arts Center =

Coordinates: 44°02′49″N 91°38′36″W

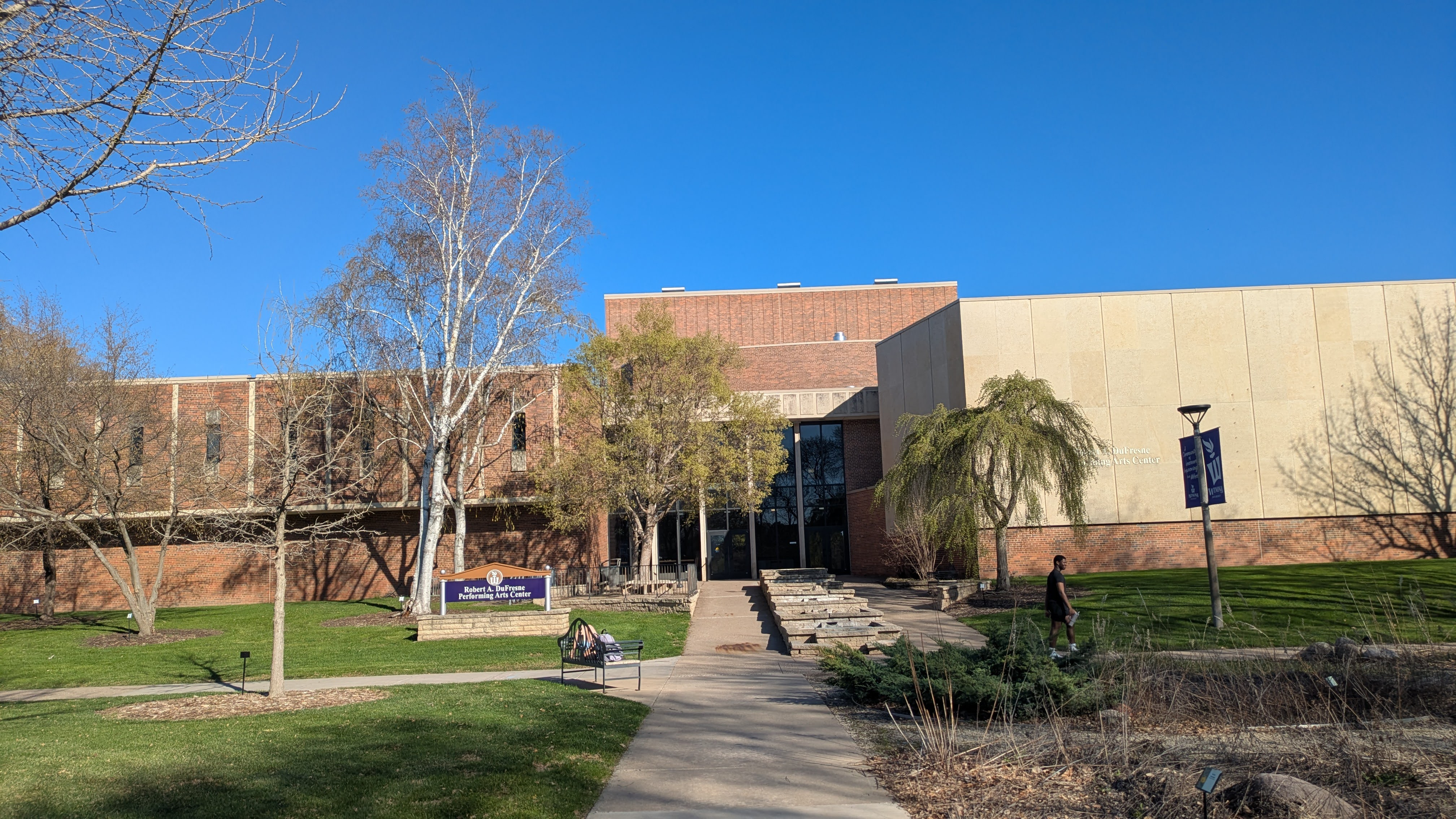
- DuFresne Performing Arts Center in 2026

General information
- Location: 450 Johnson Street, Winona, Minnesota
- Opened: 1971
- Operator: Winona State University

Technical details
- Floor count: 2

Robert A. DuFresne

The Robert A. DuFresne Performing Arts Center (also known simply as the DuFresne Performing Arts Center, 'DPAC', or 'PAC') is a performing arts center on the campus of Winona State University in Winona County, Minnesota (WSU). It includes a large band room, choir room, a 412-seat proscenium theatre, a versatile black-box theatre (The Dorothy B. Magnus Theatre), a recital hall, dance studio, scene shop, costume shop, make-up and dressing rooms, offices, and classrooms.

The building was opened in 1971. It was named for Robert DuFresne in 2019, who was WSU President when the building was opened.

The Performing Arts Center houses the Departments of Music, Theatre & Dance, and Communications Studies. It was home and performance location for the Great River Shakespeare Festival from 2004-2025.
