= Winona State University =

Public university in Winona, Minnesota, US

- Former names: First State Normal School of Minnesota (1858–1873); Winona Normal School (1873–1905); Winona State Normal School (1905-1921); Winona State Teachers' College (1921–1957); Winona State College (1957–1975)
- Motto: A Community of Learners Improving Our World
- Type: Public university
- Established: 1858; 168 years ago
- Endowment: $62.4 million (2023)
- Budget: $159 million (2019)
- President: Kenneth Janz
- Students: 6,165
- Location: Winona, Minnesota, United States
- Campus: Small city
- Colors: Purple and White
- Nickname: Warriors
- Sporting affiliations: NCAA Division II – NSIC
- Mascot: Wazoo
- Website: https://www.winona.edu/

Winona State University is a public university in Winona, Minnesota, United States. It was founded as First State Normal School of Minnesota in 1858 and is the oldest member of the Minnesota State Colleges and Universities System. It was the first normal school west of the Mississippi River.

The university offers more than 80 programs on its main campus as well as collegiate programs on satellite campuses at Winona State University-Rochester. Its average annual enrollment is approximately 6,000 undergraduate and graduate students. Its sports teams compete as the Winona State Warriors in the NCAA Division II athletics in 14 sports, primarily in the Northern Sun Intercollegiate Conference.

== History ==
Winona State University was founded as the First State Normal School of Minnesota, an institution specifically for educating and producing new elementary school teachers. In the 1850s, Minnesota was on the American frontier and lacked trained teachers. Winona settler John Ford lobbied the Minnesota Legislature to establish normal schools and rallied more than $5,000 in local donations to establish the state's first such institution. It was also the first tax-funded school west of the Mississippi River. On July 17, 1858, James Peckham introduced the bill to create the school. It passed the Minnesota House of Representatives on July 27, 45-4, and the Minnesota Senate unanimously on July 30. Governor Henry Hastings Sibley signed it into law on August 2. On November 9, 1859, the first school officials met and began work.

Locals initially opposed the school. The Winona Argus argued that the institution would likely be anti-slavery and would teach that "the national Constitution originated in sin". The Winona Daily Republican argued that the city was not ready for a school. Local opinions changed by the time the school actually began operations. The city quickly erected a small school hall, containing four rooms on two floors. This building was temporary.

Classes at Winona Normal School began on September 3, 1860, but the next year most of the male students, principal John Ogden, and other staff left to serve in the American Civil War. The school closed in March 1862 due to the war, then for another two years due to the U.S.-Dakota War. Its first class graduated in 1866. The program soon added a laboratory school in which local children were educated by faculty while students observed or, occasionally, led lessons themselves. The normal school quickly outgrew its original four-room building, and state funding and local donations of money and land led to the construction of an adequate facility in 1869.

The campus expanded with three new buildings. First was old Old Main, built from 1866 to 1870 and beginning operations in 1869. Guy E. Maxwell was elected president in 1904, and focused much of his tenure on the expansion of campus and making the school a proper college. In 1908 the Library Building was built; it served as a library, gymnasium, and kindergarten, and was renamed Ogden Hall in 1940. In 1911, Morey Hall, a women's dormitory, opened. In 1915, the Model School building (now Phelps Hall) was constructed to house the laboratory school. A second women's dormitory, Shepard Hall, was built in 1921 as enrollment continued to increase. The rise of dormitory life also saw the founding of the first clubs and the establishment of campus chapters of the YWCA and Newman Club.

Winona State Normal School became Winona Teachers College in 1921 and was authorized to grant a four-year Bachelor of Education degree. In December 1922 a fire broke out in Old Main and completely destroyed it. No one was harmed, as it was during a term break. Local public buildings and churches offered space for classes and administrative business until a new main building, College Hall, was constructed in 1924. The student newspaper was founded in 1919. First called The Pow-Wow, it was renamed The Winonan in 1922.

In 1933, tuition was introduced, which was $14 for state residents and $19 for non-residents. Enrollment declined during the World War II, reaching a low point of 200 students in 1944. The Minnesota Legislature considered shutting down the college. President Nels Minne led the college through a "building boom", constructing 12 new buildings during his tenure. When he resigned in 1967, enrollment had risen to 3,119. In 1954, the college awarded its first Master's degrees. In 1964, the nursing program began. The first nursing student graduated in spring 1968. In 1967, the single position of vice president was replaced with multiple vice presidencies.

The 1915 Model School Building, now Phelps Hall, and the 1924 College Hall, renamed Somsen Hall in 1937, were listed on the National Register of Historic Places in 2013 for having local significance in education. They were nominated as examples of the normal school movement, which helped shape public education in Minnesota. Winona Normal School was Minnesota's first teacher training school and first laboratory school, and operated from 1860 to 1971. In 2004, the school mascot, Wazoo, was introduced.

The first known student who was not white was a Ho-Chunk woman, who graduated in 1941. The first group of students of color were Filipino and Panamanian exchange students, who began attendance in 1942.

=== Name changes ===
- First State Normal School of Minnesota (1858)
- Winona Normal School (1873)
- Winona State Normal School (1905)
- Winona State Teachers' College (1921)
- Winona State College (1957)
- Winona State University (1975)

== Academics ==
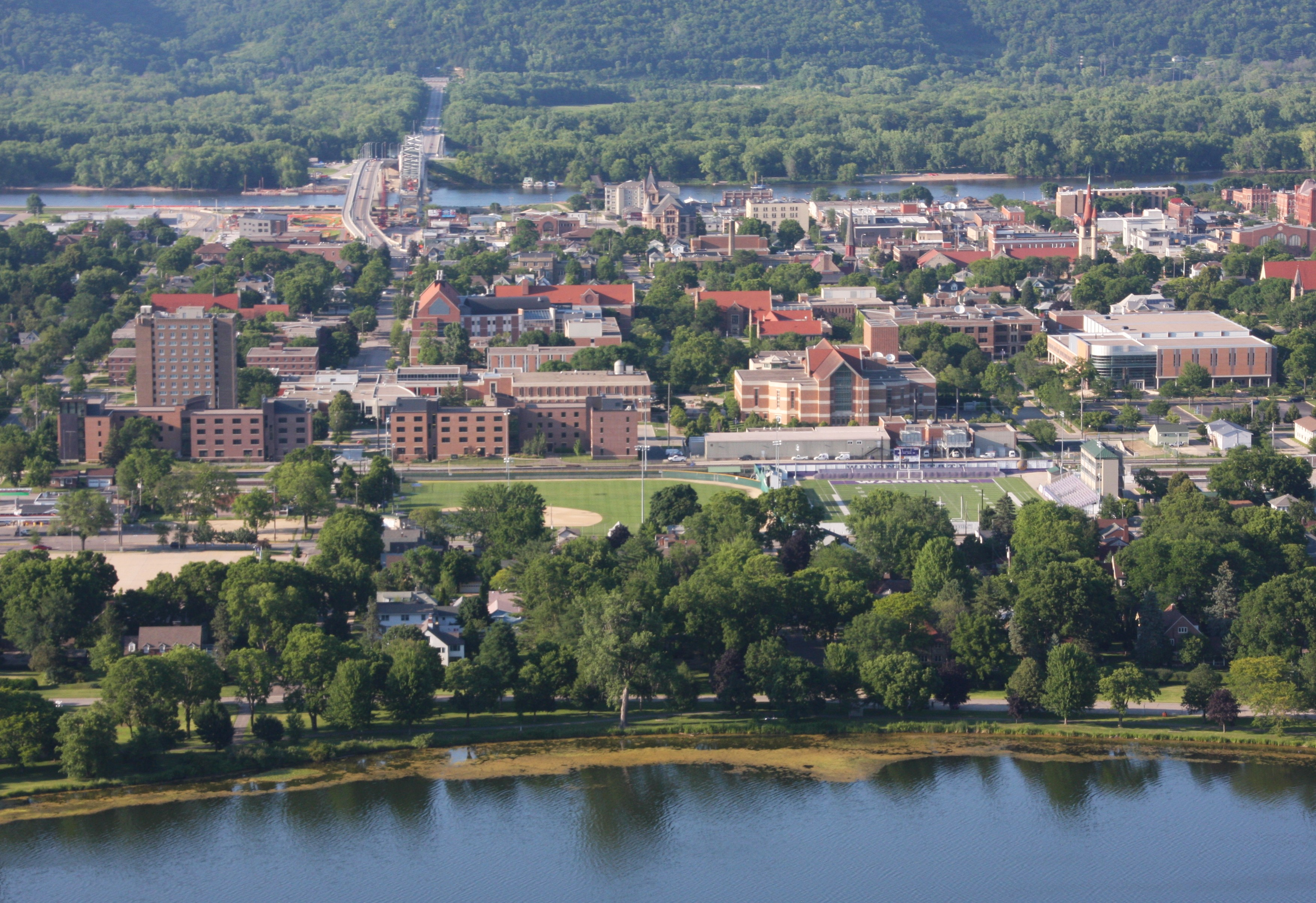
The Winona State University main campus and its surroundings in Winona, Minnesota

Academic rankings

Master's
- Washington Monthly: 294

Regional
- U.S. News & World Report: 71

National
- Forbes: RNP

Winona State University offers 65 undergraduate programs and 12 graduate programs. In 1999, it became one of the first U.S. universities to offer a "Laptop University" program, now known as the e-Warrior Digital Life and Learning Program. In this program, each student must lease an Apple Macintosh or a Microsoft Windows-based laptop from the university. In 2013 WSU became the first public university in the Midwest to offer all students a tablet and a laptop. The program's purpose is to link education and technology.

Each Winona State University student pays 43 cents per credit to fund the Minnesota State University Student Association, a student-led nonprofit that advocates on behalf of all Minnesota state university students.

=== International education ===
The International Services Office is the initial contact for all international students. Winona State University provides scholarship opportunities for International Students.

Winona State University has established many sister school relations with colleges and universities around the world, including Tamkang University in Taiwan, Hebei University of Technology in Mainland China, Akita University, Tokyo International University, Toyo University in Japan, Soonchunhyang University, Chung-Ang University in South Korea, and universities in Malaysia, Mexico, Spain, Egypt, Hong Kong, Australia, etc.

== Winona State facilities ==
Undergraduate demographics as of Fall 2023
Race and ethnicity	Total
White	82%
Hispanic	5%
Two or more races	4%
Asian	3%
Black	3%
International student	2%
Unknown	1%
Economic diversity
Low-income (Note: The percentage of students who received an income-based federal Pell grant intended for low-income students.)	25%
Affluent (Note: The percentage of students who are a part of the American middle class at the bare minimum.)	75%

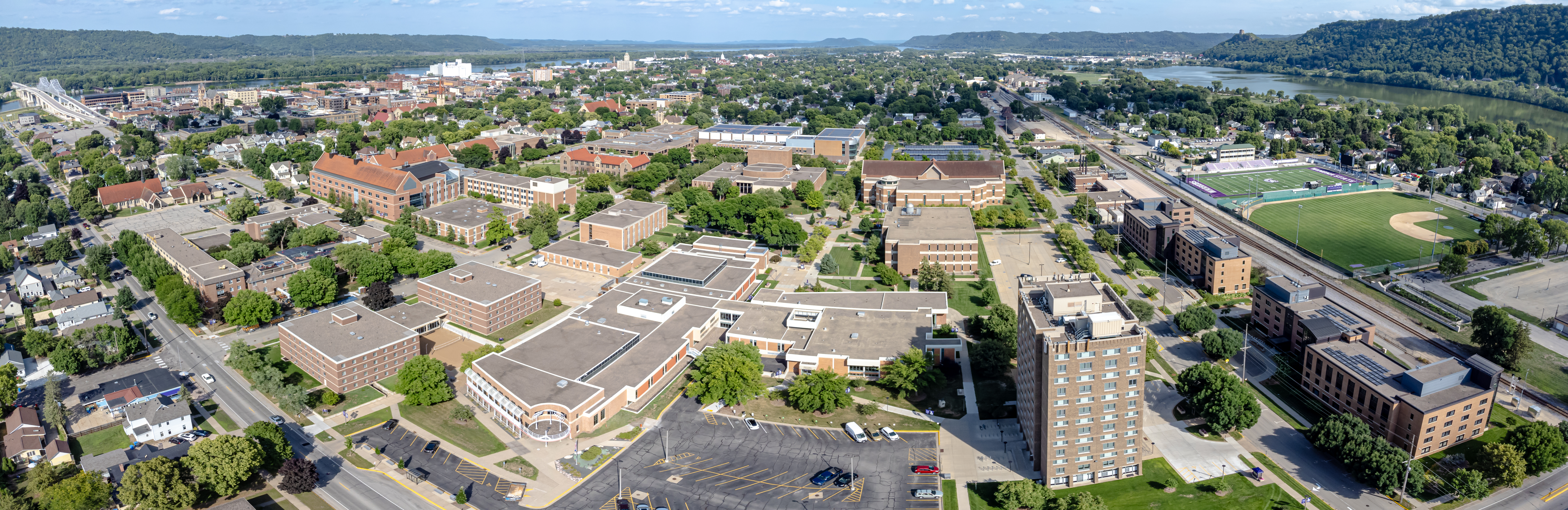

=== Student center ===
==== Kryzsko Commons ====
Kryzsko Commons in autumn 2026

Kryszko Commons is home to the Jack Kane Dining Hall, the food court, various administration offices, lounges, study rooms, the bookstore, and other common spaces for students. It is named for S. J. Kryzsko, president of the State College Board from 1957 to 1961. Originally built in 1975, it was renovated in 2013-2014. The exterior, food court, and ballroom were renovated in 2022.

=== Housing ===
Winona State University hosts on-campus living communities in multiple buildings on its main Winona campus (https://www.winona.edu/student-life/housing-dining/). Three buildings (Lourdes Hall, Tau Center, and Maria Hall) previously formed a West Campus, which was used for on-campus living until 2021.

==== Conway Hall ====
Conway Hall is a four-story building that has one female floor, one male floor, and two gender-inclusive floors. It is part of four connected dorms, collectively known as the Quad. It is named after Helen Conway, an alumna who served on the Minnstate Board of Trustees.

==== Foundation Hall ====
Foundation Hall under construction, September 2026

In 2025, Foundation Hall was approved, intended to house an additional 340 students. Plans for the hall date to 2021, but were delayed for financial reasons. The groundbreaking ceremony was held on January 20, 2026, and was attended by President Janz. The hall is still under construction.

==== Kirkland Hall and Haake Hall ====
Originally named New Hall East and New Center West, Kirkland Hall/Haake Hall opened in 2010 and consists of two adjacent buildings that are mirror images of each other. The coed complex has 106 units, each single-gendered. Kirkland Hall received a permanent name first, being named after alumni Melvin and Lois Kirkland in 2012 after the couple donated their estate to the university. In 2015, Haake Hall was permanently named after Paul Haake, who gifted the university $1.5 million in scholarship money.

==== Morey Hall and Shepard Hall ====
Morey and Shepard Halls are connected in an "L" shape. They are a part of four connected dorms, collectively known as the Quad. Morey-Shepard consists of men and women divided by floor. They are named after university presidents Charles A. Morey and Irwin Shepard. Morey Hall is the oldest housing on campus, completed in 1911. The origins of Morey Hall begin with the Normal House, which served as campus housing beginning in 1883. Until the house opened, the school provided no housing to students. In 1885, a bill was passed to the legislature to fund the construction a proper dormitory, but it was vetoed by Governor Lucius Hubbard. The first location had already been sold to a church, so a new building was quickly bought through donations. In 1903, housing moved to Morey Hall's present location.

==== Prentiss-Lucas Hall ====
Prentiss-Lucas Hall (commonly called P-L) is one of the six freshmen residence halls. Its two sides are mirror-image duplicates of each other (Prentiss is co-ed, and Lucas women's), linked by a common lobby and lower level. This hall closed down after the spring semester of 2019, but reopened in fall 2020 to accommodate single-occupancy room housing in response to COVID-19.

Lucas Hall is named after Ruth Lucas, who donated her house to the university in 1938. In 1944, Ruth's brother Ward Lucas donated his house, which was named after their father, S. L. Prentiss. Neither original house is still owned by the university. They were replaced by the modern Prentiss-Lucas Hall, built in 1964-1965 to house an influx of new students attending due to the GI Bill.

==== Richards Hall ====
Richards Hall is a four-story residence hall. It is part of four connected dorms, collectively known as the Quad. It is also co-ed; the first and third floor, excluding the Richards Annex, house men, and the second and fourth women. It is named for Florence L. Richards, dean of women at the university and a member of the English department from 1912 to 1943.

==== Sheehan Hall ====
Sheehan Hall was completed for Winona State College as a 14-story women-only hall in 1969. It is now co-ed, and houses most freshmen. The second through 13th floors are residential and the first is a lobby and social area with a full kitchen. The hall is named for Frank Sheehan, who served on the Minnstate college board from 1933 to 1937 and as the university's residence director from 1946 to his death in 1951.

==== Sustainability House ====
The Sustainability House was renovated in 2011-2012. It is used for a cohort of U.S. military veterans and additional students as necessary.

==== East Lake Apartments ====
East Lake was built in 2002-03 and opened in 2004. It is an apartment complex for both men and women. East Lake typically houses upperclassmen. Students living in East Lake need not purchase a meal plan, but can instead get a "block meal" plan.

==== Discontinued housing ====
The following buildings were known as West Campus (Residential College). They were also previously owned and operated by the College of Saint Teresa, a defunct Roman Catholic women's college. West Campus was closed for residential purposes in 2021 and put up for sale in 2022.

Winona State acquired Lourdes Hall in the early 1990s. It was completed in 1928 for the College of St. Teresa. Lourdes Hall was put up for sale with Tau Center and Maria Hall in 2022.

Tau Center was acquired in 2003 and served as a coeducational residence hall/conference center. It is behind Lourdes and was previously operated by the Diocese of Winona. It was sold to Cotter Schools in 2022.

Maria Hall was acquired by Winona State in 2000 to serve as a residence hall. It housed just over 200 students, typically freshmen. The coeducational facility housed female students on the first and third floors and male students on the second and fourth floors. Each floor had a full lounge and kitchen, complete with television, furniture, stove, refrigerator, microwave, and toaster. The basement had two large lounges, a kitchen, and a laundry room. A tunnel connects Maria to Lourdes Hall. It was sold to Cotter Schools in the spring of 2022. It was demolished in late 2025, despite local opposition.

=== Academic and sporting ===
- Model School Building and College Hall of the Winona Normal School
- U.S. National Register of Historic Places
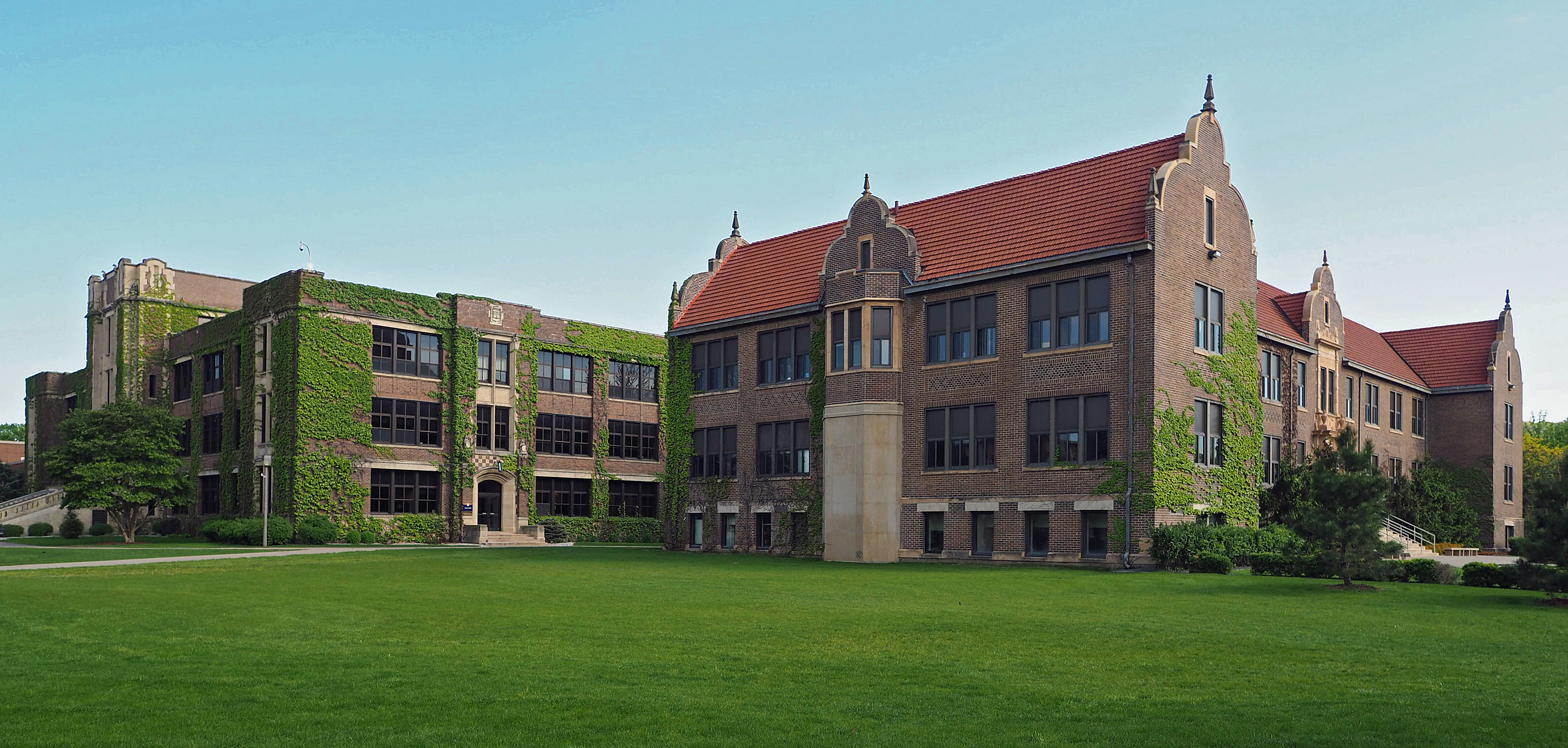
- College Hall (left) and the Model School Building (right), now Somsen and Phelps Halls

- Location within Minnesota Location within the United States
- Location: 416 Washington Street and 151 W. Sanborn Street, Winona, Minnesota
- Coordinates: 44°2′52″N 91°38′33″W
- Built: 1915 (Model School), 1924 (College Hall)
- Architect: Clarence H. Johnston Sr.
- Architectural style: Jacobethan (Model School), Collegiate Gothic (College Hall)
- NRHP reference No.: 13000884
- Added to NRHP: December 3, 2013

==== Cathedral Hall ====
Cathedral Hall is in Education Village, a group of buildings separated from campus by the Cathedral of the Sacred Heart. The building is home to an auditorium and the administration center for the education department. It was remodeled in 2018 to include an education museum.

==== Helble Hall ====
Helble Hall is also in Education Village. It is home to an atrium and the university's children's center. It was built in 1953 and was initially named Wabasha Hall, after the street it is on, Wabasha Street. Its classrooms are intended to be themed around multiple eras, including the late 19th century, the 1950s, and a modern classroom. In 2018, the hall was renamed for Donna J. Helble. Helble was a WSU professor from 1988 to 2012 and served as a trustee on the Winona State Foundation Board.

==== Gildemeister Hall ====
Gildemeister Hall is named for Theda Gildemeister, a faculty member from 1896 to 1934. It opened in 1964 and is home to the math department. By 2026, the hall was described as "deteriorating". Since 2020, it has been proposed that the hall be replaced by a new building, but this proposal has been postponed for financial reasons and remains unapproved.

==== Integrated Wellness Complex ====
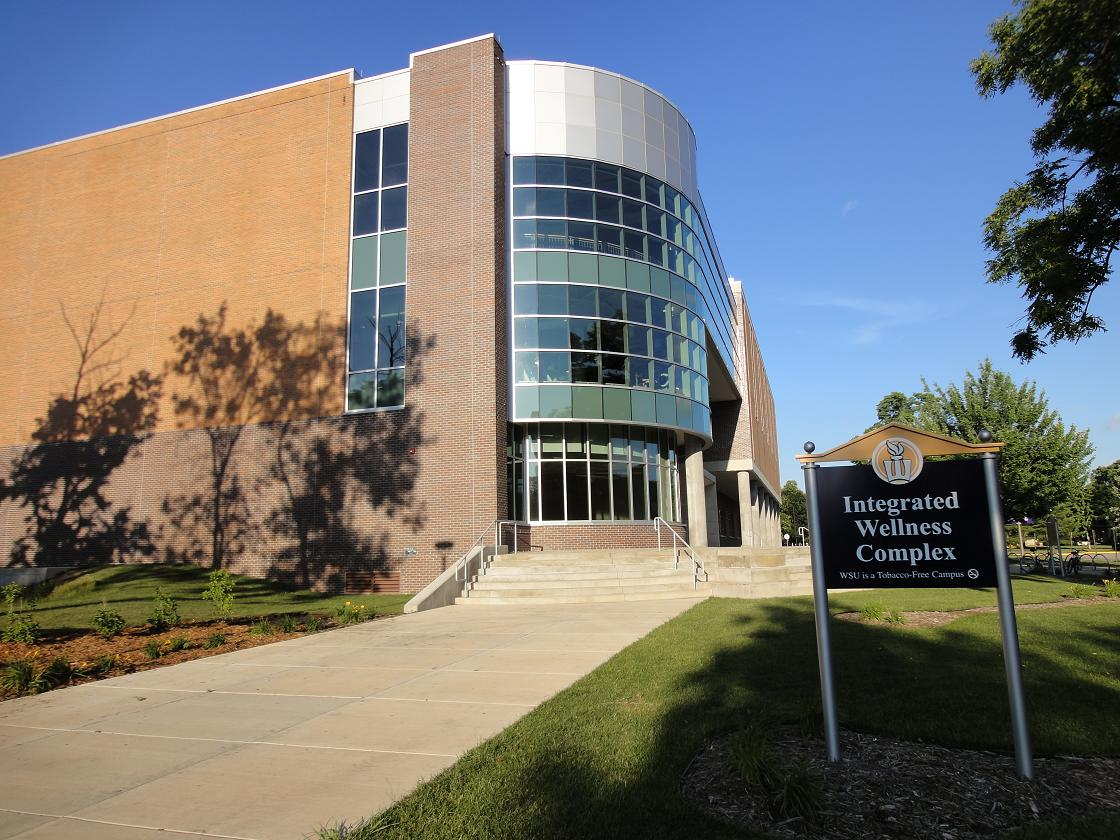
Integrated Wellness Complex

The Integrated Wellness Complex is home to the fitness center, the McCown gymnasium, and health and counseling services. It was constructed in 2010.

==== Krueger Library ====
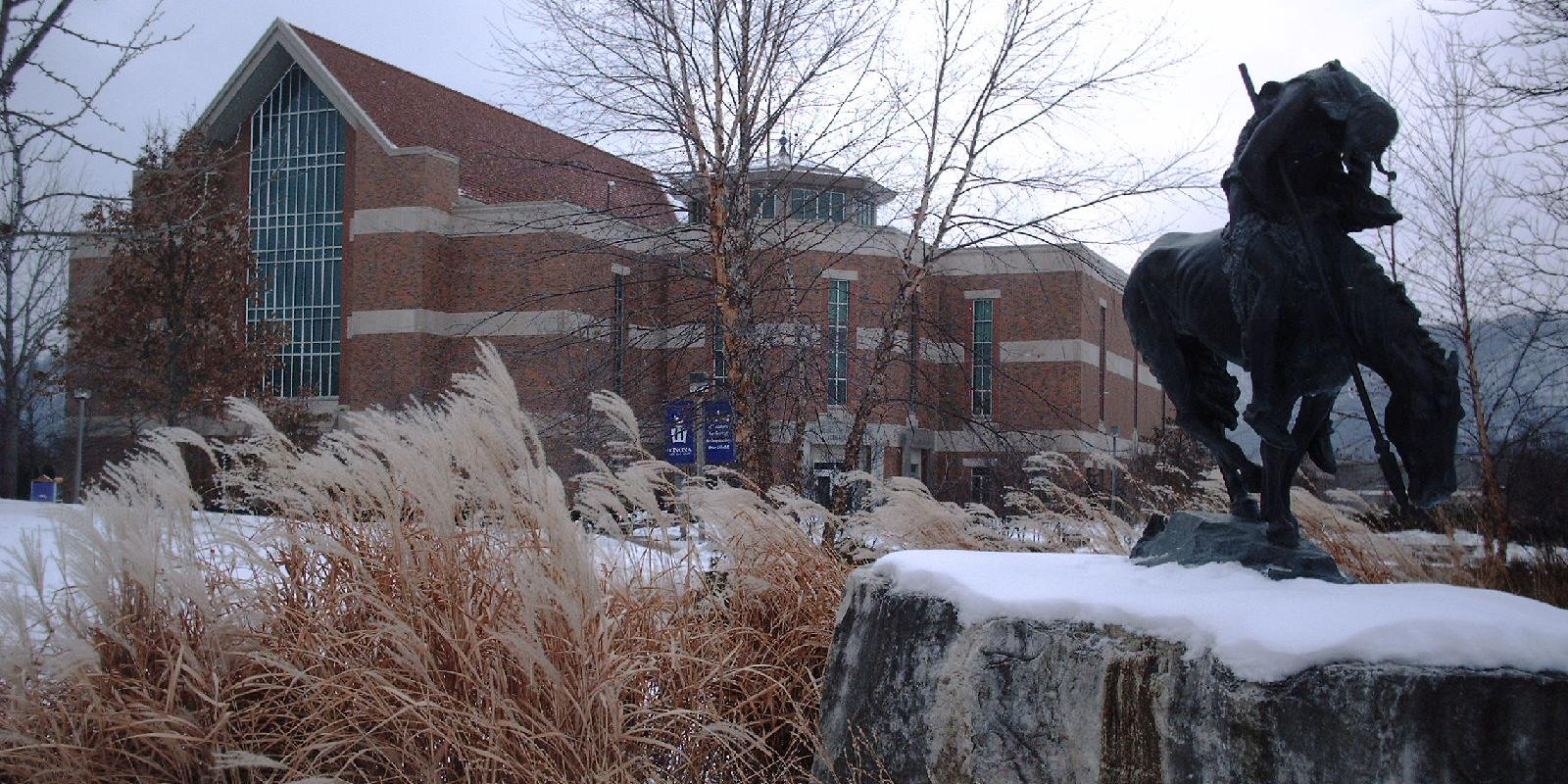
The university library, named for former university president Darrell Krueger

The Krueger Library was completed in 1999, replacing Maxwell Hall as the university's library. It was called simply the "New Library" until 2005, when it was named after university president Darrell W. Krueger.

==== Maxwell Hall ====
Maxwell Hall is named for university president Guy E. Maxwell. It was first built as a library in 1938, and was expanded in 1968. It was replaced by the Krueger Library in 1999, and is now home to the Warrior Hub, which oversees academic services, including financial aid, registrar, advising, and career and account services.

==== Memorial Hall ====
Memorial Hall is home to indoor athletic facilities. It is named in memory of Frank Sheehan.

==== Minne Hall ====
Minne Hall is home to the English, history, geography, political science, and sociology departments. It was built in 1973. It is named after Nels Minne, president of the university from 1944 to 1967. There is an observatory on the building's roof.

==== Pasteur Hall ====
Pasteur Hall is a science building, and is named for Louis Pasteur.

==== Phelps Hall ====
Phelps Hall is named for university president William F. Phelps. It is home to the mass communications department and the psychology department. Upon construction in 1915, Phelps Hall was originally called the Model School Building. Along with Somsen Hall, it is on the National Register of Historic Places. The hall hosted high school courses from opening until 1970. The hall is also home to KQAL, the campus radio station.

==== Robert A. DuFresne Performing Arts Center ====
The Robert A. DuFresne Performing Arts Center is home to the theatre arts, dance department, and the music department. It was the site of the Great River Shakespeare Festival from 2004 to 2025. It is named for Robert DuFresne, university president from 1967 to 1977.

==== Somsen Hall ====
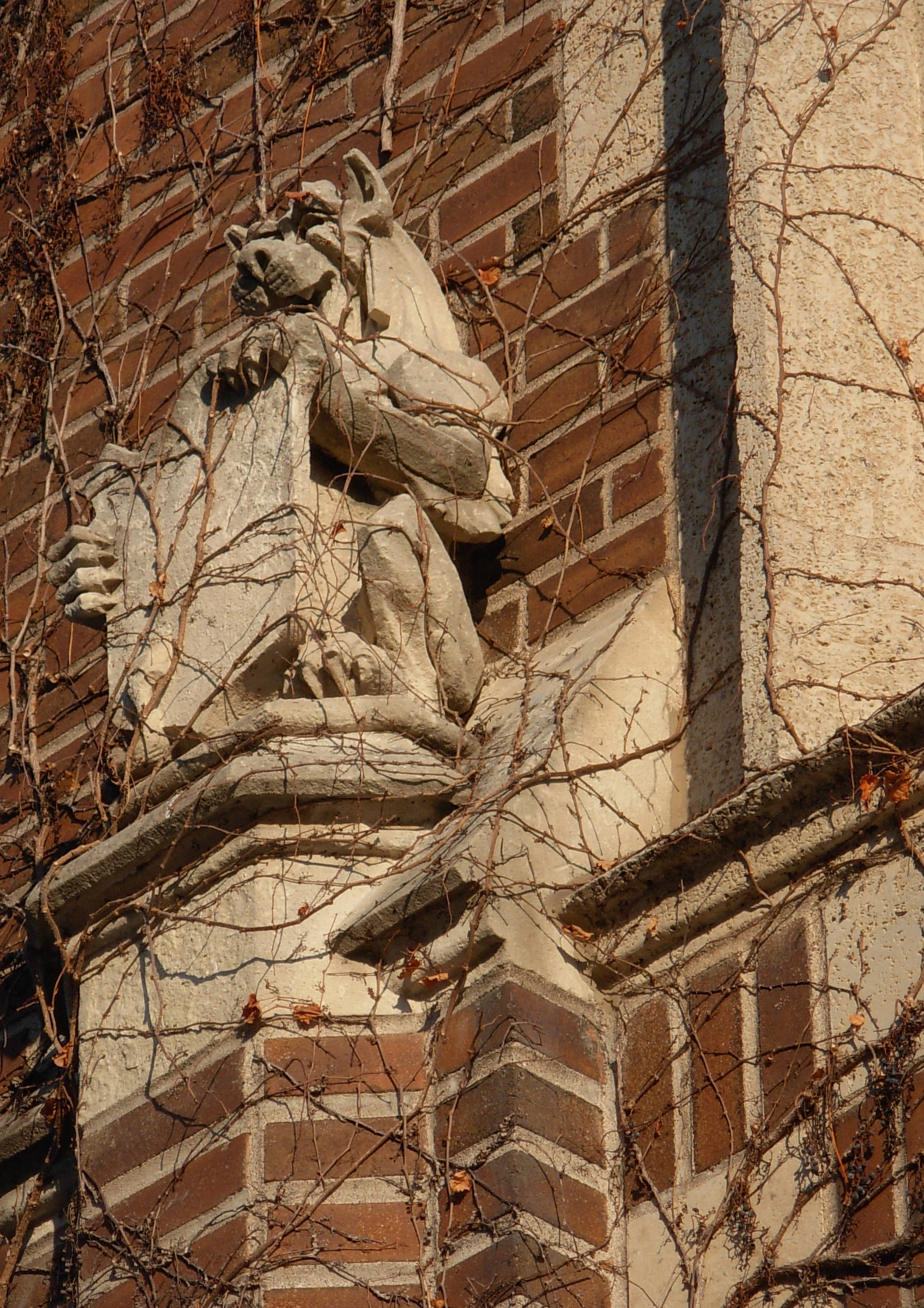
Architectural sculpture above an entrance to Somsen Hall

Somsen Hall is the main administrative building, and houses the college of business. It is named for Stephen H. Somsen, the university's residence director in 1909. The building was constructed in 1924 and was originally named College Hall. It was renamed Somsen Hall in 1937. It is built in a collegiate gothic style. The main entrance formerly featured a mural by John Martin Socha, which was covered in 2020 due to "historical inaccuracies". The hall was remodeled in 1954, including a social center. It became nicknamed "Smaug" because it was one of the few places on campus that smoking was allowed, until it was banned.

==== Stark Hall ====
Stark Hall is home to the nursing program and the Miller Brothers School of Engineering. It was built in 1992, and expanded by the Science Laboratory Center in 2004. It is named for Thomas Stark, university president from 1983 to 1988.

==== Wabasha Recreation Center ====
The Wabasha Recreation Center is in Education Village. It is home to a climbing wall, a high ropes course, and the Outdoor Education & Recreation Center, which rents camping gear to students.

==== Watkins Hall ====
Watkins Hall is home to the art program, and is named for Paul A. Watkins, who donated his large art collection to the university.

==== Fields ====
- Loughrey Field, home of Winona's baseball team
- Maxwell Field at Warrior Stadium, home of Winona State Warriors football and soccer

=== Other ===
The Gus & Sue Bolon Facilities Plant is home to the mail room, facilities services, and some trades. It was named in 2025 after Professor George Bolon's parents.

== Athletics ==
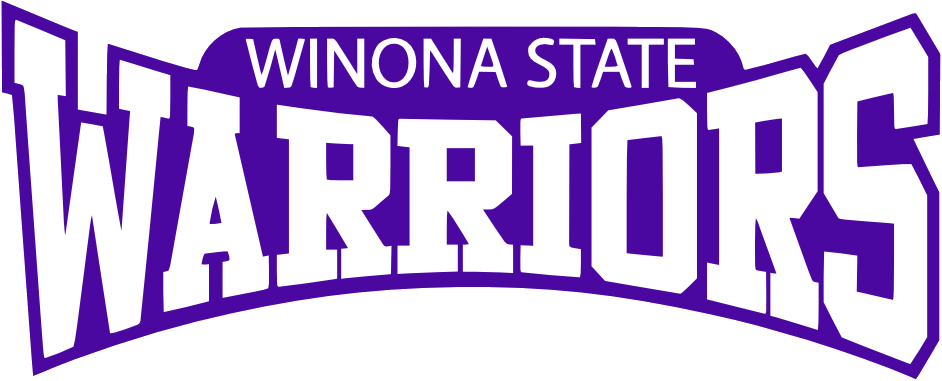
Winona State athletics wordmark

Winona State University competes in Division II NCAA athletics and its teams are called the Warriors. It is a member of the Northern Sun Intercollegiate Conference for most sports, except women's gymnastics (Wisconsin Intercollegiate Athletic Conference).

The school's first national championship came in 1985 when the gymnastics team took the National Association of Intercollegiate Athletics (NAIA) title, claiming four individual champions and 11 All-American honors, along with National Coach and Gymnast of the Year. The same year, the Warrior gymnastics team competed in the NCAA Division II nationals in Springfield, Massachusetts, taking home the third-place trophy, the first Winona State team to compete in both affiliations at the national level. The Warriors claimed the NAIA national title again in 1987, this time paced by one individual champion and seven All-American honors. Two gymnasts were named Academic All-Americans for their outstanding academic achievements, and the National Coach of the Year award went to Winona State University's head coach.

== Notable alumni ==
- Ali al-Ahmed, Saudi scholar, founder of Institute for Gulf Affairs
- Austin Aries, professional wrestler
- J.D. Barnett, college basketball coach
- Michele Bachmann, 2012 Presidential Candidate
- Karla Bigham, state senator
- John Blatnik, member of U.S. Congress
- Josh Braaten, actor
- David Braun, college football coach
- Tom Brown, college basketball coach
- Kyle and Lane Carlson, models
- Logan Clark, wrestler
- Greg Davids, member of the Minnesota House of Representatives
- Dick Day, state senator
- Mary Olstine Graham, educator
- Randall Herbst, collegiate basketball coach
- Ibrahim Ahmed Kamal, Bangladeshi composer, songwriter, founding member of Warfaze
- Jennie Ellis Keysor, educator, writer
- Austin W. Lord, architect, painter, university administrator
- Troy Merritt, 2009 PGA Tour Q-School medalist
- James J. Mingus, four-star Army General Officer, Army Vice Chief of Staff
- Patricia Neder, Olympic handball player
- Gene Pelowski, member of the Minnesota House of Representatives
- Tim Penny, member of U.S. Congress
- Jeanne Poppe, member of the Minnesota House of Representatives
- Jake Runestad, composer and conductor
- Jerry Seeman, professional football official
- Al Sheehan, entertainment businessman and radio host
- Verner Suomi, father of satellite meteorology
- Brian Wrobel, professional football player

== See also ==
- List of colleges and universities in Minnesota
- National Register of Historic Places listings in Winona County, Minnesota
