= 2026 United States state legislative elections =

- November 3, 2026

88 legislative chambers 46 states
	Majority party	Minority party	Third party
Party	Democratic	Republican	Coalition
Chambers before	39 (Note: The Minnesota House of Representatives is tied, so it is not counted towards either total.)	57	2 (Note: A coalition of 14 Democrats, 5 Independents, and 2 Republicans controls the Alaska House of Representatives. A coalition of 9 Democrats and 5 Republicans controls the Alaska Senate.)
Chambers won	51	46	2
Overall change	▲12	▼11	Steady
- Map of upper house elections: Democrats retained control Democrats gained control Republican retained control Coalition retained control Non-partisan legislature No regularly-scheduled elections

- Map of lower house elections: Democrats retained control Democrats gained control Republican retained control Coalition retained control No lower house No regularly-scheduled elections

The 2026 United States state legislative elections were held on November 3, 2026, for 88 state legislative chambers in 46 states. Across the fifty states, approximately 60% of upper house seats and 92% of lower house seats were up for election. Additionally, six territorial chambers were up in four territories and the District of Columbia. These elections took place concurrently with other state and local elections, including gubernatorial elections in multiple states.

Democrats made major gains across the country, picking up over 500 state legislative seats, the largest shift since the 2010 elections. Democrats flipped at least one legislative chamber each in Arizona, Michigan, Minnesota, Pennsylvania, and Wisconsin, gaining trifectas in each state. They also gained a trifecta in Nevada by winning the gubernatorial race and retaining control of both of Nevada's legislative chambers. Democrats broke Republican trifectas in Georgia and Texas by winning the governorship and lower house in each state, and broke the Republican trifecta in New Hampshire by winning both chambers of the state legislature. Democrats also won a majority in the North Carolina House of Representatives.

Additionally, the Democrats ended Republican supermajorities in Arkansas, Florida, Indiana, Kansas, Missouri, North Carolina, Ohio, South Carolina, and Utah. Democrats also expanded their majorities in Democratic-leaning states; in the New York State Senate, they gained their largest legislative majority since 1846, and Democrats gained the largest supermajorities in the California State Legislature in the state's history.

== Background ==
Partisan control of state legislatures following the 2024 and 2025 elections Republican control (27) Democratic control (18) Split control (4) Nonpartisan legislature (1)

The 2026 state legislative elections were held as part of the midterm elections during the second presidency of Donald Trump. Republicans had seen very modest coattails in the 2024 legislative elections, flipping a net of just over 50 seats from the Democrats and breaking Democratic trifectas in two states, but establishing no new trifectas of their own. Democrats performed very well in the 2025 elections, making substantial gains in Virginia and New Jersey and performing very well in special elections. Entering 2026, Republicans fully control 23 state governments, Democrats control 16, with 11 states under split control.

Republicans have controlled a sizeable majority of state legislative chambers across the country since the 2010 elections, giving them substantial clout over a number of policy issues, particularly redistricting prior to the 2010 redistricting cycle. Democrats have slowly made gains in chamber control since Donald Trump's first term began, particularly in 2018 and 2022, but the Republican advantage has persisted.

=== Party switching ===
Eight incumbent state legislators switched political parties during 2026.

State	Chamber	District	Legislator	Old party	New party	Ref.
Hawaii	House	14	Elle Cochran	Democratic	Republican	
Indiana	House	72	Edward Clere	Republican	Independent	
New Hampshire	House	Belknap 6	David Nagel	Republican	Democratic	
New Hampshire	House	Sullivan 6	Dale Girard	Democratic	Republican	
North Carolina	House	99	Nasif Majeed	Democratic	Independent	
North Carolina	House	106	Carla Cunningham	Democratic	Independent	
South Carolina	House	57	Lucas Atkinson	Democratic	Republican	

== Issues ==
State legislative elections have taken on increased prominence in the eyes of national political parties due to the ongoing mid-decade congressional redistricting frenzy taking place across the country, especially in the wake of the Louisiana v. Callais decision, which allowed several Republican-led states in the South to eliminate majority-Black congressional districts. With Republicans gaining a clear advantage for the 2026 elections, Democrats have turned their focus to state legislatures in key states with hopes of regaining the redistricting advantage for the 2028 elections. Affordability and the proliferation of AI data centers have also emerged as key issues in several states.

== Campaign ==
To build momentum for the broader national elections, Democrats have recruited substantially more candidates to run for state legislative offices than in previous cycles. This includes contesting every seat in Texas, South Carolina, and Maryland, and breaking decades-old recruitment highs in states such as Georgia, Indiana, and North Carolina. This has led to a drop in the number of uncontested legislative seats compared to previous years. Only 33% of state legislative seats had one candidate running unopposed in the general election, the lowest since 2018, and only 20% of incumbents ran unopposed, far lower than any election cycle since 2010.

Democrats heavily targeted control of the Arizona, Michigan, Minnesota, New Hampshire, Pennsylvania, and Wisconsin legislatures, seeking to gain supermajorities in Oregon and Washington and break Republican supermajorities in the Iowa House, Nebraska Legislature, and North Carolina Senate. National Democratic groups raised over $100 million to support legislative Democrats across the country, matching what national Republicans raised for the 2024 elections.

Several states had highly contentious primary elections which shifted power in chambers already safely held by one party. In the Indiana Senate, where a majority of the chamber's Republicans rebuked Donald Trump's mid-decade redistricting push as a part of his broader attempts to maintain Republican control of congress after the midterms, six of the defiant members lost renomination, while another two retired. In New York, six (Note: One race has not yet been called) new candidates endorsed by the Democratic Socialists of America won primaries across both chambers, nearly doubling the size of the party's caucus. The DSA made gains across the country, winning over 60 Democratic primaries, although their direct influence is expected to be low, representing fewer than 1% of legislative seats nationwide. Two legislative leaders have also been defeated. Utah Senate President Stuart Adams lost in a race dominated by a contentious planned AI data center, while North Carolina Senate leader Phil Berger narrowly lost his primary as well.

== Summary tables ==
=== States ===
Regularly scheduled elections were held in 88 of the 99 state legislative chambers in the United States. Nationwide, regularly scheduled elections were held for 6,064 of the 7,383 legislative seats. Most legislative chambers held elections for all seats, but some legislative chambers that use staggered elections hold elections for only a portion of the total seats in the chamber. The chambers that were not up for election either hold regularly scheduled elections in odd-numbered years, or have four-year terms and hold all regularly scheduled elections in presidential election years.

Note that this table only covers regularly scheduled elections; additional special elections will likely take place concurrently with these regularly scheduled elections.

State	Upper house				Lower house			
State	Seats up	Total	% up	Term	Seats up	Total	% up	Term
Alabama	35	35	100	4	105	105	100	4
Alaska	10	20	50	4	40	40	100	2
Arizona	30	30	100	2	60	60	100	2
Arkansas	17	35	49	2/4 (Note: The upper houses of Arkansas, Delaware, Florida, Hawaii, Illinois, Minnesota, New Jersey, and Texas use a 2-4-4 term length system.)	100	100	100	2
California	20	40	50	4	80	80	100	2
Colorado	18	35	51	4	65	65	100	2
Connecticut	36	36	100	2	151	151	100	2
Delaware	11	21	52	2/4	41	41	100	2
Florida	20	40	50	2/4	120	120	100	2
Georgia	56	56	100	2	180	180	100	2
Hawaii	13	25	52	2/4	51	51	100	2
Idaho	35	35	100	2	70	70	100	2
Illinois	39	59	66	2/4	118	118	100	2
Indiana	25	50	50	4	100	100	100	2
Iowa	25	50	50	4	100	100	100	2
Kansas	0	40	0	4	125	125	100	2
Kentucky	19	38	50	4	100	100	100	2
Louisiana	0	39	0	4	0	105	0	4
Maine	35	35	100	2	151	151	100	2
Maryland	47	47	100	4	141	141	100	4
Massachusetts	40	40	100	2	160	160	100	2
Michigan	38	38	100	4	110	110	100	2
Minnesota	67	67	100	2/4	134	134	100	2
Mississippi	0	52	0	4	0	122	0	4
Missouri	17	34	50	4	163	163	100	2
Montana	25	50	50	4	100	100	100	2
Nebraska	24 (Note: These figures represent the seats of Nebraska's unicameral legislature.)	49	49	4	(unicameral)			
Nevada	11	21	52	4	42	42	100	2
New Hampshire	24	24	100	2	400	400	100	2
New Jersey	0	40	0	2/4	0	80	0	2
New Mexico	0	42	0	4	70	70	100	2
New York	63	63	100	2	150	150	100	2
North Carolina	50	50	100	2	120	120	100	2
North Dakota	24	47	51	4	47	94	50	4
Ohio	17	33	52	4	99	99	100	2
Oklahoma	24	48	50	4	101	101	100	2
Oregon	15	30	50	4	60	60	100	2
Pennsylvania	25	50	50	4	203	203	100	2
Rhode Island	38	38	100	2	75	75	100	2
South Carolina	0	46	0	4	124	124	100	2
South Dakota	35	35	100	2	70	70	100	2
Tennessee	17	33	52	4	99	99	100	2
Texas	16	31	52	2/4	150	150	100	2
Utah	15	29	52	4	75	75	100	2
Vermont	30	30	100	2	150	150	100	2
Virginia	0	40	0	4	0	100	0	2
Washington	24	49	49	4	98	98	100	2
West Virginia	17	34	50	4	100	100	100	2
Wisconsin	17	33	52	4	99	99	100	2
Wyoming	16	31	52	4	62	62	100	2
Total	1184	1973	60	—N/a	4959	5413	92	—N/a

=== Territories ===
Regularly scheduled elections were held in 6 of the 9 territorial legislative chambers in the United States, for 84 of the 192 territorial legislative seats; the territory of Puerto Rico does not hold legislative elections in mid-term years, as does the American Samoa Senate.

State	Upper house				Lower house			
State	Seats up	Total	% up	Term	Seats up	Total	% up	Term
American Samoa	0	18	0	4	21	21	100	2
District of Columbia	7	13	54	4	(unicameral)			
Guam	15	15	100	2	(unicameral)			
Northern Mariana Islands	6	9	67	4	20	20	100	2
Puerto Rico	0	28	0	4	0	53	0	4
US Virgin Islands	15	15	100	2	(unicameral)			
Total	43	98	44	—N/a	41	94	44	—N/a

== Electoral predictions ==
Several sites and individuals publish predictions of competitive chambers. These predictions look at factors such as the strength of the party, the strength of the candidates, and the partisan leanings of the state (reflected in part by the state's Cook Partisan Voting Index rating). The predictions assign ratings to each chambers, with the rating indicating the predicted advantage that a party has in winning that election.

Early predictions saw a slightly more competitive state legislative landscape than at this point in previous election cycles, with most of the competitive being Republican-held. Democrats hope to capitalize on a potential wave election to win control of these chambers and break Republican supermajorities in others. By the fall, a number of chambers shifted towards the Democrats as their national standings and polling improved, particularly in the Midwest, where Republicans control a number of competitive chambers in swing states. Sabato's Crystal Ball forecasts mild Democratic gains, while State Navigate is much more bullish, anticipating Democrats flipping over 400 legislative seats across the country.

Ratings are designated as follows:

- "Tossup": No advantage
- "Tilt": Advantage that is not quite as strong as "lean"
- "Lean": Slight advantage
- "Likely": Significant, but surmountable, advantage (Note: Sabato's Crystal Ball additionally uses the "Likely" characterization to indicate chambers where a shift in control is unlikely, but the minority party could make significant gains and/or break a legislative supermajority.)
- "Safe": Near-certain chance of victory

State	PVI	Chamber	Last election	Sabato Oct. 16, 2026	State Nav. (Note: Ratings are interpreted as follows: "Slight" favorites = Tilt; "Narrow" or "moderate" favorites = Lean; "Solid" or "Strong" favorites = Likely; "Overwhelming favorites" or "near certain" = Safe) Nov. 2, 2026	Result
Alabama	R+15	Senate	R 27–8	Safe R	Safe R	R 24–10–1
Alabama	R+15	House	R 77–28	Safe R	Safe R	R 74–31
Alaska	R+6	Senate	Coal. 14–6	Lean Coal.	Safe Coal.	Coal. 11–9
Alaska	R+6	House	Coal. 21–19	Lean Coal.	Likely Coal.	Coal. 24–16
Arizona	R+2	Senate	R 17–13	Tossup	Likely D (flip)	D 20–10
Arizona	R+2	House	R 33–27	Tossup	Likely D (flip)	D 37–23
Arkansas	R+15	Senate	R 29–6	Safe R	Safe R	R 28–7
Arkansas	R+15	House	R 81–19	Safe R	Safe R	R 70–30
California	D+12	Senate	D 30–10	Safe D	Safe D	D 32–8
California	D+12	Assembly	D 60–20	Safe D	Safe D	D
Colorado	D+6	Senate	D 23–12	Safe D	Safe D	D 24–11
Colorado	D+6	House	D 43–22	Safe D	Safe D	D 49–16
Connecticut	D+8	Senate	D 25–11	Safe D	Safe D	D 33–3
Connecticut	D+8	House	D 102–49	Safe D	Safe D	D 116–35
Delaware	D+8	Senate	D 15–6	Safe D	Safe D	D 15–6
Delaware	D+8	House	D 27–14	Safe D	Safe D	D 30–11
Florida	R+5	Senate	R 28–12	Likely R	Safe R	R 26–13–1
Florida	R+5	House	R 85–35	Likely R	Safe R	R 70–50
Georgia	R+1	Senate	R 33–23	Likely R	Likely R	R 29–27
Georgia	R+1	House	R 100–80	Lean R	Lean R	D 92–88
Hawaii	D+13	Senate	D 22–3	Safe D	Safe D	D 22–3
Hawaii	D+13	House	D 42–9	Safe D	Safe D	D 44–6–1
Idaho	R+18	Senate	R 29–6	Safe R	Safe R	R 28–7
Idaho	R+18	House	R 61–9	Safe R	Safe R	R 56–14
Illinois	D+6	Senate	D 40–19	Safe D	Safe D	D 45–14
Illinois	D+6	House	D 78–40	Safe D	Safe D	D 84–34
Indiana	R+9	Senate	R 40–10	Safe R	Safe R	R 35–15
Indiana	R+9	House	R 70–30	Likely R	Safe R	R 54–46
Iowa	R+6	Senate	R 35–15	Likely R	Safe R	R 32–18
Iowa	R+6	House	R 67–33	Likely R	Likely R	R 56–44
Kansas	R+8	House	R 88–37	Likely R	Safe R	R 68–57
Kentucky	R+15	Senate	R 31–7	Safe R	Safe R	R 30–8
Kentucky	R+15	House	R 80–20	Safe R	Safe R	R 74–26
Maine	D+4	Senate	D 20–15	Likely D	Safe D	D 24–11
Maine	D+4	House	D 76–73–2	Lean D	Safe D	D
Maryland	D+15	Senate	D 34–13	Safe D	Safe D	D 35–12
Maryland	D+15	House	D 102–39	Safe D	Safe D	D 106–35
Massachusetts	D+14	Senate	D 35–5	Safe D	Safe D	D 35–5
Massachusetts	D+14	House	D 134–25–1	Safe D	Safe D	D
Michigan	EVEN	Senate	D 20–18	Tossup	Safe D	D 23–15
Michigan	EVEN	House	R 58–52	Tossup	Likely D (flip)	D 63–47
Minnesota	D+3	Senate	D 34–33	Tossup	Safe D	D 39–28
Minnesota	D+3	House	67–67	Tossup	Safe D (flip)	D 77–57
Missouri	R+9	Senate	R 24–10	Likely R	Safe R	R 22–12
Missouri	R+9	House	R 111–52	Likely R	Safe R	R 95–68
Montana	R+10	Senate	R 32–18	Safe R	Safe R	R 30–20
Montana	R+10	House	R 58–42	Safe R	Safe R	R 56–44
Nevada	R+1	Senate	D 13–8	Safe D	Safe D	D 13–8
Nevada	R+1	Assembly	D 27–15	Safe D	Safe D	D 32–10
New Hampshire	D+2	Senate	R 16–8	Lean R	Lean D (flip)	D 15–9
New Hampshire	D+2	House	R 222–178	Lean D (flip)	Likely D (flip)	D 293–106–1
New Mexico	D+4	House	D 44–26	Safe D	Safe D	D 47–23
New York	D+8	Senate	D 41–22	Safe D	Safe D	D 48–15
New York	D+8	Assembly	D 103–47	Safe D	Safe D	D 111–39
North Carolina	R+1	Senate	R 30–20	Likely R	Likely R	R 26–24
North Carolina	R+1	House	R 71–49	Likely R	Lean D (flip)	D 71–48–1
North Dakota	R+18	Senate	R 42–5	Safe R	Safe R	R 41–6
North Dakota	R+18	House	R 83–11	Safe R	Safe R	R 80–14
Ohio	R+5	Senate	R 24–9	Likely R	Safe R	R 22–11
Ohio	R+5	House	R 65–34	Likely R	Safe R	R
Oklahoma	R+17	Senate	R 40–8	Safe R	Safe R	R 40–8
Oklahoma	R+17	House	R 81–20	Safe R	Safe R	R 75–26
Oregon	D+8	Senate	D 18–12	Safe D	Safe D	D 19–11
Oregon	D+8	House	D 36–24	Safe D	Safe D	D 39–21
Pennsylvania	R+1	Senate	R 28–22	Tossup	Lean D (flip)	D 26–24
Pennsylvania	R+1	House	D 102–101	Likely D	Safe D	D 113–90
Rhode Island	D+8	Senate	D 34–4	Safe D	Safe D	D 36–2
Rhode Island	D+8	House	D 64–10–1	Safe D	Safe D	D 66–8–1
South Carolina	R+8	House	R 88–36	Safe R	Safe R	R 79–45
South Dakota	R+15	Senate	R 32–3	Safe R	Safe R	R 33–2
South Dakota	R+15	House	R 64–6	Safe R	Safe R	R 59–10–1
Tennessee	R+14	Senate	R 27–6	Safe R	Safe R	R 27–6
Tennessee	R+14	House	R 75–24	Safe R	Safe R	R 69–30
Texas	R+6	Senate	R 20–11	Likely R	Safe R	R 19–12
Texas	R+6	House	R 88–62	Likely R	Likely R	D
Utah	R+11	Senate	R 23–6	Safe R	Safe R	R 21–8
Utah	R+11	House	R 61–14	Safe R	Safe R	R 45–28–2
Vermont	D+17	Senate	D 16–13–1	Safe D	Safe D	D 20–8–1–1
Vermont	D+17	House	D 87–56–4–3	Safe D	Safe D	D 102–38–6–4
Washington	D+10	Senate	D 30–19	Safe D	Safe D	D 31–18
Washington	D+10	House	D 59–39	Safe D	Safe D	D 66–32
West Virginia	R+21	Senate	R 32–2	Safe R	Safe R	R 30–4
West Virginia	R+21	House	R 91–9	Safe R	Safe R	R 79–21
Wisconsin	EVEN	Senate	R 18–15	Lean D (flip)	Likely D (flip)	D 18–15
Wisconsin	EVEN	Assembly	R 54–45	Tossup	Lean D (flip)	D 53–46
Wyoming	R+23	Senate	R 29–2	Safe R	Safe R	R 29–2
Wyoming	R+23	House	R 56–6	Safe R	Safe R	R 55–7

== Maps ==
Partisan control of state governments following the 2026 elections:
Democratic trifecta maintained
Republican trifecta maintained
Democratic trifecta established
Divided government established
Divided government maintained
Officially non-partisan, unicameral legislature
TBD

== National results ==
=== States ===
Lower house results by party
Party	Seats before (Note: Counts seats that were vacant prior to the election towards the party that last held them)	Chambers before	Seats after	+/-	Chambers after	+/-
Democratic	2,419	19		▲	27	▲8
Republican	2,971	28		▼	21	▼7
Independent	20	0	22	▲2	0	Steady
Progressive	3	0	7	▲4	0	Steady
Green	0	0	1	▲1	0	Steady
Total	5,413	49	5,413	—	49	—

Upper house results by party (Note: Counts seats in the officially nonpartisan Nebraska legislature towards the party that endorsed each candidate)
Party	Seats before	Chambers before	Seats after	+/-	Chambers after	+/-
Republican	1,124	29	1,026	▼98	25	▼4
Democratic	844	20	941	▲97	24	▲4
Independent	3	0	5	▲2	0	Steady
Progressive	1	0	1	Steady	0	Steady
Forward	1	0	0	▼1	0	Steady
Total	1,973	50	1,973	—	50	—

=== Territories ===
Lower house results by party
Party	Seats before	Chambers before	Seats after	+/-	Chambers after	+/-
Republican/PNP	40	1	41	▲1	1	Steady
Democratic/PDP	25	1	14	▼11	0	▼1
Independent	25	1	35	▲10	2	▲1
Others	4	0	4	Steady	0	Steady
Total	94	3	94	—	3	—

Upper house results by party
Party	Seats before	Chambers before	Seats after	+/-	Chambers after	+/-
Democratic/PDP	35	2	35	Steady	2	Steady
Republican/PNP	32	3	32	Steady	3	Steady
Independent	28	1	28	Steady	1	Steady
Others	3	0	3	Steady	0	Steady
Total	98	6	98	—	6	—

== State summaries ==
=== Alabama ===
All of the seats of the Alabama Legislature were up for election. Both chambers have been controlled by the Republican Party since 2011. The Senate election originally would have taken place under slightly different maps from the 2022 election after a federal judge overturned two Montgomery-area districts over vote dilution concerns, creating an additional majority-Black district there. This decision was stayed after the Louisiana v. Callais Supreme Court decision, which significantly weakened the part of the Voting Rights Act that was used to justify the original decision, returning the elections to the original maps.

Republicans maintained control of both chambers, though their majorities were reduced.

Alabama Senate
Party	Leader	Before	After	Change
Republican	Garlan Gudger	27	24	▼3
Democratic	Bobby Singleton	8	10	▲2
Independent		0	1	▲1
Total		35	35	

Alabama House of Representatives
Party	Leader	Before	After	Change
Republican	Nathaniel Ledbetter	76	74	▼2
Democratic	Anthony Daniels	29	31	▲2
Total		105	105	

=== Alaska ===
Half of the seats of the Alaska Senate and all of the seats of the Alaska House of Representatives were up for election in 2026. Both houses were controlled by coalitions of Democrats, Republicans, and independents. In the Senate, the coalition retained control of the chamber, although three Republicans joined the minority, shrinking the majority to a bare minimum of 11 members. In the House, coalition-aligned candidates flipped several seats from Republicans, giving the Democratic-Independent bloc a majority of seats, but they chose to remain as a bipartisan coalition, retaining Republican Chuck Kopp as majority leader. More Republicans could potentially join the majority coalition as well.

Alaska Senate
Party	Leader	Before	After	Change
Democratic	Gary Stevens (retiring)	9	8	▼1
Independent	Gary Stevens (retiring)	0	1	▲1
Republican	Gary Stevens (retiring)	5	2	Steady
Republican	Mike Cronk	6	9	Steady
Total		20	20	

Alaska House of Representatives
Party	Leader	Before	After	Change
Democratic	Bryce Edgmon (retiring)	14	17	▲3
Independent	Bryce Edgmon (retiring)	5	7	▲2
Republican	Bryce Edgmon (retiring)	2	TBD (Note: At least one Republican is a coalition member, more may join prior to the start of the legislative session.)	▼5
Republican	DeLena Johnson	19	16	▼5
Total		40	40	

=== Arizona ===
All of the seats of the Arizona Legislature were up for election. Democrats won control of both chambers from the Republicans, winning a supermajority in the Senate and a majority in the House for the first time since prior to the 1966 elections.

Arizona Senate
Party	Leader	Before	After	Change
Democratic	Priya Sundareshan	13	20	▲7
Republican	Warren Petersen (retiring)	17	10	▼7
Total		30	30	

Arizona House of Representatives
Party	Leader	Before	After	Change
Democratic	Oscar De Los Santos	27	37	▲10
Republican	Steve Montenegro	33	23	▼10
Total		60	60	

=== Arkansas ===
All of the seats of the Arkansas House of Representatives were up for election. 17 of the 35 seats in the Arkansas Senate were up for election. Republicans maintained control of both chambers, but Democrats made gains in each, breaking the 3/4ths supermajority in the House required to pass appropriations legislation.

Arkansas Senate
Party	Leader	Before	After	Change
Republican	Bart Hester	29	28	▼1
Democratic	Greg Leding (term-limited)	6	7	▲1
Total		35	35	

Arkansas House of Representatives
Party	Leader	Before	After	Change
Republican	Brian S. Evans	80	70	▼10
Democratic	Andrew Collins	20	30	▲10
Total		100	100	

=== California ===
All of the seats of the California State Assembly were up for election, while half of the seats in the California Senate were up for election. Democrats increased their supermajorities in both chambers to their largest in state history.

California Senate
Party	Leader	Before	After	Change
Democratic	Monique Limón	30	32	▲2
Republican	Brian Jones (term-limited)	10	8	▼2
Total		40	40	

California Assembly
Party	Leader	Before	After	Change
Democratic	Robert Rivas	60		▲
Republican	Alexandra Macedo (defeated)	20		▼
Total		80	80	

=== Colorado ===
Half of the seats of the Colorado Senate and all of the seats of the Colorado House of Representatives were up for election in 2026. Democrats expanded their majorities in both chambers, attaining supermajorities in each, allowing them to unilaterally pass constitutional amendments and override gubernatorial vetoes without Republican support.

Colorado State Senate
Party	Leader	Before	After	Change
Democratic	James Coleman	23	24	▲1
Republican	Cleave Simpson	12	11	▼1
Total		35	35	

Colorado House of Representatives
Party	Leader	Before	After	Change
Democratic	Julie McCluskie (term-limited)	43	49	▲6
Republican	Jarvis Caldwell	22	16	▼6
Total		65	65	

=== Connecticut ===
All of the seats of the Connecticut State Senate and the Connecticut House of Representatives were up for election in 2026. Democrats expanded their supermajorities in both chambers, winning their largest majorities since the 1970s, including over 90% of the seats in the Senate.

Connecticut State Senate
Party	Leader	Before	After	Change
Democratic	Martin Looney (retiring)	25	33	▲8
Republican	Stephen Harding (defeated)	11	3	▼8
Total		36	36	

Connecticut House of Representatives
Party	Leader	Before	After	Change
Democratic	Matthew Ritter	102	116	▲14
Republican	Vincent Candelora	49	35	▼14
Total		151	151	

=== Delaware ===
Half of the seats of the Delaware State Senate and all of the Delaware House of Representatives were up for election in 2026. Democrats maintained their supermajority in the Senate while gaining one in the House, giving them the power to unilaterally pass constitutional amendments without Republican support.

Delaware State Senate
Party	Leader	Before	After	Change
Democratic	David Sokola (retiring)	15	15	Steady
Republican	Gerald Hocker	6	6	Steady
Total		21	21	

Delaware House of Representatives
Party	Leader	Before	After	Change
Democratic	Melissa Minor-Brown	27	30	▲3
Republican	Timothy Dukes	14	11	▼3
Total		41	41	

=== Florida ===
All of the seats of the Florida House of Representatives were up for election. 20 of the 40 seats in the Florida Senate were up for election. Democrats made gains in both chambers, particularly in the House, breaking the Republican supermajorities in both chambers.

Florida Senate
Party	Leader	Before	After	Change
Republican	Ben Albritton	27	26	▼1
Democratic	Lori Berman (term-limited)	12	13	▲1
Independent	Jason Pizzo	1	1	Steady
Total		40	40	

Florida House of Representatives
Party	Leader	Before	After	Change
Republican	Daniel Perez (term-limited)	86	70	▼16
Democratic	Fentrice Driskell (term-limited)	34	50	▲16
Total		120	120	

=== Georgia ===
All of the seats of the Georgia State Senate and the Georgia House of Representatives were up for election in 2026. Democrats won control of the House from the Republicans for the first time since 2002, and although they made substantial gains in the Senate, Republicans maintained their majority by a narrow margin, denying a government trifecta from newly-elected Democratic governor Keisha Lance Bottoms.

Georgia State Senate
Party	Leader	Before	After	Change
Republican	Jason Anavitarte	33	29	▼4
Democratic	Harold V. Jones II	23	27	▲4
Total		56	56	

Georgia House of Representatives
Party	Leader	Before	After	Change
Democratic	Carolyn Hugley	81	92	▲11
Republican	Jon Burns	99	88	▼11
Total		180	180	

=== Hawaii ===
Half of the seats of the Hawaii Senate and all of the seats of the Hawaii House of Representatives were up for election in 2026. Democrats maintained supermajority control of both chambers, expanding their presence in the House. Paʻele Kiakona, a leader of Lahaina Strong, became the first member of the Green Party elected to the Hawaii Legislature in the state's history.

Hawaii Senate
Party	Leader	Before	After	Change
Democratic	Ron Kouchi	22	22	Steady
Republican	Brenton Awa	3	3	Steady
Total		25	25	

Hawaii House of Representatives
Party	Leader	Before	After	Change
Democratic	Nadine Nakamura	41	44	▲3
Republican	Lauren Matsumoto	10	6	▼4
Green	Paʻele Kiakona	0	1	▲1
Total		51	51	

=== Idaho ===
All of the seats of the Idaho Senate and the Idaho House of Representatives were up for election in 2026. In the primary election, moderate Republicans made gains over the more hardline wing of the party, which had been gaining ground in recent election cycles. Republicans maintained their supermajority control of both chambers, but Democrats made gains in each.

Idaho Senate
Party	Leader	Before	After	Change
Republican	Kelly Anthon	29	28	▼1
Democratic	Melissa Wintrow	6	7	▲1
Total		35	35	

Idaho House of Representatives
Party	Leader	Before	After	Change
Republican	Mike Moyle	61	56	▼5
Democratic	Ilana Rubel	9	14	▲5
Total		70	70	

=== Illinois ===
Two thirds of the seats of the Illinois Senate and all of the seats of the Illinois House of Representatives were up for election in 2026. Democrats maintained control of both chambers, expanding their majorities.

Illinois Senate
Party	Leader	Before	After	Change
Democratic	Don Harmon	40	45	▲5
Republican	John Curran	19	14	▼5
Total		59	59	

Illinois House of Representatives
Party	Leader	Before	After	Change
Democratic	Chris Welch	78	84	▲6
Republican	Tony McCombie	40	34	▼6
Total		118	118	

=== Indiana ===
Half of the seats of the Indiana Senate and all of the seats of the Indiana House of Representatives were up for election in 2026. Republican President Donald Trump, governor Mike Braun, and other conservative groups, threatened primary challenges against several members of the Indiana Senate for voting against a proposed congressional redistricting. Six senators who voted against redistricting lost renomination, while two more retired. Running candidates in nearly every district up for election and buoyed by improved fundraising and the victory of Beau Bayh in the race for Secretary of State, Democrats made considerable gains in both chambers, breaking the Republican supermajority in the House and narrowing the Republican supermajority in the Senate. As of November 21, the election in Senate District 45 is in dispute; while Republican Chris Garten is the unofficial winner, a recount is pending.

Indiana Senate
Party	Leader	Before	After	Change
Republican	Rodric Bray	40	35	▼5
Democratic	Shelli Yoder	10	15	▲5
Total		50	50	

Indiana House of Representatives
Party	Leader	Before	After	Change
Republican	Todd Huston	69	54	▼15
Democratic	Phil GiaQuinta	30	46	▲16
Independent	Edward Clere (retiring)	1	0	▼1
Total		100	100	

=== Iowa ===
Half of the seats of the Iowa Senate and all of the seats of the Iowa House of Representatives were up for election in 2026. Democrats had broken Republicans' supermajority in the Senate in 2025 following two special election victories. They held one of those seats, losing the other, while flipping one other Republican-held seat to prevent Republicans from winning back their supermajority. They made significant gains in the House as well, breaking the Republican supermajority in the chamber, with both results significantly strengthening the veto power of incoming Democratic governor Rob Sand despite Republicans maintaining their majorities.

Iowa Senate
Party	Leader	Before	After	Change
Republican	Amy Sinclair	33	32	▼1
Democratic	Janice Weiner	17	18	▲1
Total		50	50	

Iowa House of Representatives
Party	Leader	Before	After	Change
Republican	Pat Grassley	67	56	▼11
Democratic	Brian Meyer	33	44	▲11
Total		100	100	

=== Kansas ===
All of the seats of the Kansas House of Representatives were up for election in 2026. Democrats flipped 20 seats in the chamber, shattering the Republican supermajority and securing their largest caucus since 1992 significantly strengthening the veto power of incoming Democratic governor Cindy Holscher, which had been weak under previous Democratic governors such as Laura Kelly, and allowing the party to block Republicans from unilaterally passing constitutional amendments.

Kansas House of Representatives
Party	Leader	Before	After	Change
Republican	Daniel Hawkins (retiring)	88	68	▼20
Democratic	Brandon Woodard	37	57	▲20
Total		125	125	

=== Kentucky ===
Half of the seats of the Kentucky Senate and all of the seats of the Kentucky House of Representatives were up for election in 2026. The final Senate Democrat from a rural district, Robin Webb, switched parties in 2025. Democrats made gains in both chambers in the general election, although Republicans maintained their supermajorities in each. Democrats also lost their final rural House seat in the state, where they had previously dominated in the eastern coalfields.

Kentucky Senate
Party	Leader	Before	After	Change
Republican	Robert Stivers	32	30	▼2
Democratic	Gerald A. Neal	6	8	▲2
Total		38	38	

Kentucky House of Representatives
Party	Leader	Before	After	Change
Republican	David W. Osborne	80	74	▼6
Democratic	Pamela Stevenson (retiring)	20	26	▲6
Total		100	100	

=== Maine ===
All of the seats of the Maine Senate and the Maine House of Representatives were up for election in 2026. Democrats maintained control both chambers, expanding their majorities.

Maine Senate
Party	Leader	Before	After	Change
Democratic	Mattie Daughtry	20	24	▲4
Republican	Trey Stewart	14	11	▼3
Independent	Rick Bennett (retiring)	1	0	▼1
Total		35	35	

Maine House of Representatives
Party	Leader	Before	After	Change
Democratic	Ryan Fecteau	75		▲
Republican	Billy Bob Faulkingham (term-limited)	73		▼
Independent	—	3	3	Steady
Total		151	151	

=== Maryland ===
All of the seats of the Maryland General Assembly were up for election. Democrats maintained control of both chambers, expanding their majorities.

Maryland Senate
Party	Leader	Before	After	Change
Democratic	Bill Ferguson	34	35	▲1
Republican	Steve Hershey	13	12	▼1
Total		47	47	

Maryland House of Delegates
Party	Leader	Before	After	Change
Democratic	Joseline Peña-Melnyk	102	106	▲4
Republican	Jason C. Buckel	39	35	▼4
Total		141	141	

=== Massachusetts ===
All of the seats of the Massachusetts Senate and the Massachusetts House of Representatives were up for election in 2026. Democrats maintained control both chambers, gaining seats in the House of Representatives.

Massachusetts Senate
Party	Leader	Before	After	Change
Democratic	Karen Spilka	35	35	Steady
Republican	Bruce Tarr	5	5	Steady
Total		40	40	

Massachusetts House of Representatives
Party	Leader	Before	After	Change
Democratic	Ron Mariano	134		▲
Independent	Ron Mariano	1	1	Steady
Republican	Bradley Jones Jr. (retiring)	25		▼
Total		160	160	

=== Michigan ===
All of the seats of the Michigan Senate and the Michigan House of Representatives were up for election in 2026. Democrats expanded their majority in the Senate to its largest size since 1982, and also won control of the House of Representatives, which they lost to Republicans in 2024.

Michigan Senate
Party	Leader	Before	After	Change
Democratic	Winnie Brinks (term-limited)	20	23	▲3
Republican	Aric Nesbitt (term-limited)	18	15	▼3
Total		38	38	

Michigan House of Representatives
Party	Leader	Before	After	Change
Democratic	Ranjeev Puri	52	63	▲11
Republican	Matt Hall	58	47	▼11
Total		110	110	

=== Minnesota ===
All of the seats of the Minnesota Senate and the Minnesota House of Representatives were up for election in 2026. Following the 2022 and 2024 elections, Democratic–Farmer–Laborites narrowly controlled the Senate, while the House was tied and controlled under a power-sharing agreement by both parties. Both of these compositions remained unchanged through a string of special elections held throughout 2025 and early 2026, including one caused by the assassination of former House Speaker Melissa Hortman. Democrats expanded their majority in the Senate while winning back control of the House, regaining the government trifecta they had lost in 2024.

Minnesota Senate
Party	Leader	Before	After	Change
Democratic (DFL)	Erin Murphy	34	39	▲5
Republican	Mark Johnson	33	28	▼5
Total		67	67	

Minnesota House of Representatives
Party	Leader	Before	After	Change
Democratic (DFL)	Zack Stephenson	67	77	▲10
Republican	Lisa Demuth (retiring)	67	57	▼10
Total		134	134	

=== Missouri ===
Half of the seats of the Missouri Senate and all of the seats of the Missouri House of Representatives were up for election in 2026. Republicans maintained control of both chambers, though their majorities were reduced.

Missouri Senate
Party	Leader	Before	After	Change
Republican	Cindy O'Laughlin (term-limited)	24	22	▼2
Democratic	Doug Beck	10	12	▲2
Total		34	34	

Missouri House of Representatives
Party	Leader	Before	After	Change
Republican	Jonathan Patterson (term-limited)	111	95	▼16
Democratic	Ashley Aune	52	68	▲16
Total		163	163	

=== Montana ===
Half of the seats of the Montana Senate and all of the seats of the Montana House of Representatives were up for election in 2026. In response to a loose coalition of moderate Republicans and Democrats in the Senate, the Montana Republican Party censured nine of its members, withholding electoral support from them. Five of those Republicans were up for election in 2026.

Republicans maintained control of both chambers, though their majorities were reduced.

Montana Senate
Party	Leader	Before	After	Change
Republican	Matt Regier	32	30	▼2
Democratic	Pat Flowers (term-limited)	18	20	▲2
Total		50	50	

Montana House of Representatives
Party	Leader	Before	After	Change
Republican	Brandon Ler	58	56	▼2
Democratic	Katie Sullivan (term-limited)	42	44	▲2
Total		100	100	

=== Nebraska ===
Nebraska is the only U.S. state with a unicameral legislature; half of the seats of the Nebraska Legislature were up for election in 2026. Nebraska is also unique in that its legislature is officially non-partisan and holds non-partisan elections, although the Democratic and Republican parties each endorse legislative candidates.

Nebraska Legislature
Party	Before	After	Change
Republican	33	30	▼3
Democratic	15	18	▲3
Independent	1	1	Steady
Total	49	49	

=== Nevada ===
Half of the seats of the Nevada Senate and all of the seats of the Nevada Assembly were up for election in 2026. Democrats maintained control of both chambers, gaining seats in the Nevada Assembly.

Nevada Senate
Party	Leader	Before	After	Change
Democratic	Nicole Cannizzaro	13	13	Steady
Republican	Robin Titus	8	8	Steady
Total		21	21	

Nevada Assembly
Party	Leader	Before	After	Change
Democratic	Steve Yeager (retiring)	27	32	▲5
Republican	Gregory Hafen II	15	10	▼5
Total		42	42	

=== New Hampshire ===
All of the seats of the New Hampshire Senate and the New Hampshire House of Representatives were up for election in 2026. Democrats gained control of both chambers, including a supermajority in the House of Representatives, setting up a divided government with Republican governor Kelly Ayotte.

New Hampshire Senate
Party	Leader	Before	After	Change
Democratic	Rebecca Perkins Kwoka	8	15	▲7
Republican	Sharon Carson	16	9	▼7
Total		24	24	

New Hampshire House of Representatives
Party	Leader	Before	After	Change
Democratic	Alexis Simpson	179	293	▲114
Republican	Sherman Packard	220	106	▼114
Independent	—	1	1	Steady
Total		400	400	

=== New Mexico ===
All of the seats of the New Mexico House of Representatives were up for election in 2026. Democrats maintained control of the chamber, expanding their majority.

New Mexico House of Representatives
Party	Leader	Before	After	Change
Democratic	Javier Martínez	44	47	▲3
Republican	Gail Armstrong	26	23	▼3
Total		70	70	

=== New York ===
All of the seats of the New York State Senate and the New York State Assembly were up for election in 2026. Democrats maintained control both chambers, expanding their majorities.

New York State Senate
Party	Leader	Before	After	Change
Democratic	Andrea Stewart-Cousins (retiring)	41	48	▲7
Republican	Rob Ortt	22	15	▼7
Total		63	63	

New York State Assembly
Party	Leader	Before	After	Change
Democratic	Carl Heastie	103	111	▲8
Republican	Ed Ra	47	39	▼8
Total		150	150	

=== North Carolina ===
All of the seats of the North Carolina Senate and the North Carolina House of Representatives were up for election in 2026. Republicans maintained control of the Senate, though they lost their supermajority. Democrats gained control of the House of Representatives.

North Carolina Senate
Party	Leader	Before	After	Change
Republican	Phil Berger (primaried)	30	26	▼4
Democratic	Sydney Batch	20	24	▲4
Total		50	50	

North Carolina House of Representatives
Party	Leader	Before	After	Change
Democratic	Robert T. Reives II	47	71	▲24
Republican	Destin Hall	71	48	▼23
Independent	—	2	1	▼1
Total		120	120	

=== North Dakota ===
Half of the seats of the North Dakota Senate and the North Dakota House of Representatives were up for election in 2026. Republicans maintained control of both chambers, though their majorities were reduced.

North Dakota Senate
Party	Leader	Before	After	Change
Republican	Kyle Davison	42	41	▼1
Democratic-NPL	Kathy Hogan (retiring)	5	6	▲1
Total		47	47	

North Dakota House of Representatives
Party	Leader	Before	After	Change
Republican	Robin Weisz	83	80	▼3
Democratic-NPL	Zac Ista	11	14	▲3
Total		94	94	

=== Ohio ===
All of the seats of the Ohio House of Representatives were up for election. 16 of the 33 seats in the Ohio Senate were up for election. Republicans maintained control of both chambers, though their majorities were reduced.

Ohio Senate
Party	Leader	Before	After	Change
Republican	Rob McColley (term-limited)	24	22	▼2
Democratic	Nickie Antonio (term-limited)	9	11	▲2
Total		33	33	

Ohio House of Representatives
Party	Leader	Before	After	Change
Republican	Matt Huffman	65		▼
Democratic	Dani Isaacsohn	34		▲
Total		99	99	

=== Oklahoma ===
Half of the seats of the Oklahoma Senate and all of the seats of the Oklahoma House of Representatives were up for election in 2026. The far-right Republican Freedom Caucus had sought to take control of the legislature, but it lost significant ground in the state's primary and runoff elections.

Republicans maintained control of both chambers, though their majority in the House of Representatives was reduced.

Oklahoma Senate
Party	Leader	Before	After	Change
Republican	Lonnie Paxton	40	40	Steady
Democratic	Julia Kirt	8	8	Steady
Total		48	48	

Oklahoma House of Representatives
Party	Leader	Before	After	Change
Republican	Kyle Hilbert	81	75	▼6
Democratic	Cyndi Munson (retiring)	20	26	▲6
Total		101	101	

=== Oregon ===
Half of the seats of the Oregon State Senate and all of the seats of the Oregon House of Representatives were up for election in 2026. Democrats maintained control of both chambers, expanding their majorities.

Oregon State Senate
Party	Leader	Before	After	Change
Democratic	Rob Wagner	18	19	▲1
Republican	Bruce Starr	12	11	▼1
Total		30	30	

Oregon House of Representatives
Party	Leader	Before	After	Change
Democratic	Julie Fahey	37	39	▲2
Republican	Lucetta Elmer	23	21	▼2
Total		60	60	

=== Pennsylvania ===
Half of the seats of the Pennsylvania State Senate and all of the seats of the Pennsylvania House of Representatives were up for election in 2026. Republicans currently control the upper chamber while Democrats control the lower chamber. Democrats gained control of the Senate while expanding their majority in the House of Representatives.

Pennsylvania State Senate
Party	Leader	Before	After	Change
Democratic	Jay Costa	23	26	▲3
Republican	Joe Pittman	27	24	▼3
Total		50	50	

Pennsylvania House of Representatives
Party	Leader	Before	After	Change
Democratic	Joanna McClinton	103	113	▲10
Republican	Jesse Topper	100	90	▼10
Total		203	203	

=== Rhode Island ===
All of the seats of the Rhode Island Senate and the Rhode Island House of Representatives were up for election in 2026. Democrats maintained control of both chambers, expanding their majorities.

Rhode Island Senate
Party	Leader	Before	After	Change
Democratic	Valarie Lawson	34	36	▲2
Republican	Jessica de la Cruz	4	2	▼2
Total		38	38	

Rhode Island House of Representatives
Party	Leader	Before	After	Change
Democratic	Christopher Blazejewski	64	66	▲2
Republican	Michael Chippendale	10	8	▼2
Independent	Michael Chippendale	1	1	Steady
Total		75	75	

=== South Carolina ===
All of the seats of the South Carolina House of Representatives were up for election in 2026. Republicans maintained control of the chamber, though their majority was reduced.

South Carolina House of Representatives
Party	Leader	Before	After	Change
Republican	Murrell Smith, Jr.	89	79	▼10
Democratic	Todd Rutherford	35	45	▲10
Total		124	124	

=== South Dakota ===
All of the seats of the South Dakota Senate and the South Dakota House of Representatives were up for election in 2026. Republicans maintained control of both chambers, expanding their Senate majority while losing ground in the House of Representatives.

South Dakota Senate
Party	Leader	Before	After	Change
Republican	Chris Karr (term-limited)	32	33	▲1
Democratic	Liz Larson	3	2	▼1
Total		35	35	

South Dakota House of Representatives
Party	Leader	Before	After	Change
Republican	Jon Hansen (term-limited)	65	59	▼6
Democratic	Erin Healy (term-limited)	5	10	▲5
Independent	—	0	1	▲1
Total		70	70	

=== Tennessee ===
Half of the seats of the Tennessee Senate and all of the seats of the Tennessee House of Representatives were up for election in 2026. Republicans maintained control of both chambers, though their House majority shrank.

Tennessee Senate
Party	Leader	Before	After	Change
Republican	Randy McNally (retiring)	27	27	Steady
Democratic	Raumesh Akbari	6	6	Steady
Total		33	33	

Tennessee House of Representatives
Party	Leader	Before	After	Change
Republican	Cameron Sexton	75	69	▼6
Democratic	Karen Camper	24	30	▲6
Total		99	99	

=== Texas ===
Half of the seats of the Texas Senate and all of the seats of the Texas House of Representatives were up for election in 2026. Republicans maintained control of the Senate, but Democrats flipped control of the House, winning it for the first time since the 2000 elections.

Texas Senate
Party	Leader	Before	After	Change
Republican	Charles Perry	19	19	Steady
Democratic	Carol Alvarado	12	12	Steady
Total		31	31	

Texas House of Representatives
Party	Leader	Before	After	Change
Democratic	Gene Wu	62		▲
Republican	Dustin Burrows	88		▼
Total		150	150	

=== Utah ===
Half of the seats of the Utah State Senate and all of the seats of the Utah House of Representatives were up for election in 2026. Republicans maintained control of both chambers, though their majorities were reduced.

Utah Senate
Party	Leader	Before	After	Change
Republican	Stuart Adams (primaried)	22	21	▼1
Democratic	Luz Escamilla	6	8	▲2
Forward	Emily Buss	1	0	▼1
Total		29	29	

Utah House of Representatives
Party	Leader	Before	After	Change
Republican	Mike Schultz	61	45	▼16
Democratic	Angela Romero	14	28	▲14
Independent	—	0	2	▲2
Total		75	75	

=== Vermont ===
All of the seats of the Vermont Senate and the Vermont House of Representatives were up for election in 2026. Democrats maintained control of both chambers, expanding their majorities.

Vermont Senate
Party	Leader	Before	After	Change
Democratic	Philip Baruth (retiring)	16	20	▲4
Republican	Scott Beck	13	8	▼5
Progressive	Tanya Vyhovsky	1	1	Steady
Independent	—	0	1	▲1
Total		30	30	

Vermont House of Representatives
Party	Leader	Before	After	Change
Democratic	Jill Krowinski (retiring)	87	102	▲15
Republican	Patricia McCoy	56	38	▼18
Progressive	Kate Logan (retiring)	3	7	▲4
Independent	—	4	3	▼1
Total		150	150	

=== Washington ===
Half of the seats of the Washington State Senate and all of the seats of the Washington House of Representatives were up for election in 2026. Democrats maintained control of both chambers, expanding their majorities.

Washington State Senate
Party	Leader	Before	After	Change
Democratic	Jamie Pedersen	30	31	▲1
Republican	John Braun	19	18	▼1
Total		49	49	

Washington House of Representatives
Party	Leader	Before	After	Change
Democratic	Laurie Jinkins	59	66	▲7
Republican	Drew Stokesbary	39	32	▼7
Total		98	98	

=== West Virginia ===
Half of the seats of the West Virginia Senate and all of the seats of the West Virginia House of Delegates were up for election in 2026. Republicans maintained control of both chambers, though their majorities were reduced.

West Virginia Senate
Party	Leader	Before	After	Change
Republican	Randy Smith	32	30	▼2
Democratic	Mike Woelfel (retiring)	2	4	▲2
Total		34	34	

West Virginia House of Delegates
Party	Leader	Before	After	Change
Republican	Roger Hanshaw	91	79	▼12
Democratic	Sean Hornbuckle	9	21	▲12
Total		100	100	

=== Wisconsin ===
Half of the seats of the Wisconsin Senate and all of the seats of the Wisconsin State Assembly were up for election in 2026. Democrats sought to capitalize by the gains they made in 2024 after court-ordered redistricting gave them more favorable maps to run on. They made flipped control of both chambers, winning control of the legislature, and a government trifecta with it, for the first time since before the 2010 elections.

Wisconsin Senate
Party	Leader	Before	After	Change
Democratic	Dianne Hesselbein	15	18	▲3
Republican	Devin LeMahieu (retiring)	18	15	▼3
Total		33	33	

Wisconsin State Assembly
Party	Leader	Before	After	Change
Democratic	Greta Neubauer	45	53	▲8
Republican	Robin Vos (retiring)	54	46	▼8
Total		99	99	

=== Wyoming ===
Half of the seats of the Wyoming Senate and all of the seats of the Wyoming House of Representatives were up for election in 2026. The state's far-right Republican Freedom Caucus, which had won a majority of the House in 2024, sought to take full legislative control by winning a majority in the Senate, but they lost most of their House seats and a number of Senate seats in the primary elections, instead. The partisan makeup of the legislature remained virtually unchanged in the general election, with Democrats gaining just one seat in the House, but both chambers nominated traditional Republicans to lead them in response to the collapse of the Freedom Caucus.

Wyoming Senate
Party	Leader	Before	After	Change
Republican	Bo Biteman (retiring)	29	29	Steady
Democratic	Mike Gierau	2	2	Steady
Total		31	31	

Wyoming House of Representatives
Party	Leader	Before	After	Change
Republican	Chip Neiman (retiring)	56	55	▼1
Democratic	Mike Yin	6	7	▲1
Total		62	62	

== Territorial and federal district summaries ==
=== American Samoa ===
All of the seats of the American Samoa House of Representatives were up for election. Members of the House of Representatives serve two-year terms. Gubernatorial and legislative elections are conducted on a nonpartisan basis in American Samoa.

=== District of Columbia ===
The Council of the District of Columbia serves as the legislative branch of the federal district of Washington, D.C. Half of the council seats were up for election in 2026. Council members serve four-year terms. The Democratic Party maintained their supermajority.

District of Columbia Council
Party	Leader	Before	After	Change
Democratic	Phil Mendelson	11	11	Steady
Independent		2	2	Steady
Total		13	13	Steady

=== Guam ===
All of the seats of the unicameral Legislature of Guam were up for election in 2026; Republicans maintained controlled this chamber.

Guam Legislature
Party	Leader	Before	After	Change
Republican	Frank F. Blas Jr. (retiring)	9	8	▼1
Democratic	Tina Rose Muña Barnes (retiring)	6	7	▲1
Total		15	15	

=== Northern Mariana Islands ===
A portion of the seats of the Northern Mariana Islands Senate, and all of the seats of the Northern Mariana Islands House of Representatives, were up for election in 2026. Prior to the election, a coalition of Republicans and Independents controlled the senate, while a coalition of Democrats and Independents controlled the house. After the elections, Republicans gained control of the Senate while independents won a supermajority in the House of Representatives.

Northern Mariana Islands Senate
Party	Leader	Before	After	Change
Republican	Karl King-Nabors	4	5	▲1
Independent	Karl King-Nabors	4	2	▼2
Democratic	Celina Babauta (de facto)	1	2	▲1
Total		9	9	

Northern Mariana Islands House of Representatives
Party	Leader	Before	After	Change
Democratic	Edmund Villagomez (retiring)	2	1	▼1
Independent	Edmund Villagomez (retiring)	12	14	▼2
Independent	Roy Ada	4	14	▼2
Republican	Roy Ada	2	5	▲3
Total		20	20	

=== U.S. Virgin Islands ===
All of the seats of the unicameral Legislature of the Virgin Islands were up for election in 2026. All members of the legislature serve a two-year term. The Democratic Party maintained control of the chamber.

Virgin Islands Legislature
Party	Leader	Before	After	Change
Democratic	Milton E. Potter (retiring)	12	10	▼2
Independent	Dwayne DeGraff	3	5	▲2
Total		15	15	Steady

== Special elections ==
Total net change in legislative seats due to special elections as of August 2026 +1 Dem seat +2 Dem seats

There are currently 88 state legislative special elections scheduled for 2026. More than half of all states have procedures for special state legislative elections. Democrats have performed especially well in special elections, outperforming Kamala Harris' 2024 performance by an average of 10 percentage points and flipping six seats across the country. Many of the seats Democrats have flipped came from districts which voted strongly for Donald Trump in 2024, and the party's consistent overperformances indicate a wide enthusiasm gap between Democratic and Republican voters. They also, however, signal a shift in the electorate's educational gap, with highly educated voters, who are more likely to vote in special elections, voting for Democrats more often than in previous decades.

Several of these special elections have decided control of their respective legislative chambers, although none have resulted in a shift in power. Democrats maintained control of the Michigan Senate, Pennsylvania House of Representatives, and Virginia Senate while maintaining the even split in the Minnesota House of Representatives.

=== Alabama ===
District		Incumbent			This race	
Chamber	No.	Representative	Party	First elected	Results	Candidates
House	63	Cynthia Almond	Republican	2022 (special)	Incumbent resigned June 15, 2025, after being appointed to the Alabama Public Service Commission. New member elected January 13, 2026. Republican hold.	▌ ✓ Norman Crow (Republican) 64.5%; ▌Judith Taylor (Democratic) 35.5%
House	38	Debbie Wood	Republican	2018	Incumbent resigned July 31, 2025, to spend time with her family. New member elected February 3, 2026. Republican hold.	▌ ✓ Kristin Nelson (Republican) 84.7%; ▌Hazel Floyd (Democratic) 15.2%

=== Arkansas ===
District		Incumbent			This race	
Chamber	No.	Representative	Party	First elected	Results	Candidates
House	70	Carlton Wing	Republican	2016	Incumbent resigned September 30, 2025, to become head of Arkansas PBS. New member elected March 3, 2026. Democratic gain.	▌ ✓ Alex Holladay (Democratic) 57.4%; ▌Bo Renshaw (Republican) 42.6%
Senate	26	Gary Stubblefield	Republican	2012	Incumbent died September 2, 2025, of complications during surgery. New member elected March 3, 2026. Republican hold.	▌ ✓ Brad Simon (Republican) 69.0%; ▌Adam Watson (Independent) 31.0%
House	44	Stan Berry	Republican	2018	Incumbent died March 23, 2026. New member elected August 4, 2026. Republican hold.	▌ ✓ Bill Teeter (Republican) 100%
House	8	Austin McCollum	Republican	2016	Incumbent resigned August 5, 2026, after being arrested on domestic violence charges. New member elected November 3, 2026. Republican hold.	▌ ✓ Kara Armas (Republican) 59.7%; ▌Parker Stohlton (Democratic) 40.3%
Senate	1	Ben Gilmore	Republican	2020	Incumbent resigned June 30, 2026, in order to take a position under the state attorney general. New member elected November 3, 2026. Republican hold.	▌ ✓ Harrell Wilson (Republican) 68.4%; ▌Tomeka Butler (Democratic) 31.6%
Senate	18	Jonathan Dismang	Republican	2010	Incumbent resigned September 15, 2026, in order to take a position at the Electric Cooperatives of Arkansas. New member to be elected December 15, 2026.	▌Camille Fayen (Democratic); ▌Steven McClelland (Independent); ▌Trevor McGarrah (Independent); ▌Will Moore (Republican)

=== Colorado ===
District		Incumbent			This race	
Chamber	No.	Representative	Party	First elected	Results	Candidates
Senate	17	Sonya Jaquez Lewis	Democratic	2020	Incumbent resigned February 18, 2025, due to an ethics investigation. Interim appointee elected November 3, 2026. (Note: Katie Wallace was appointed as interim senator by a vacancy committee on March 18, 2025.); Democratic hold.	▌ ✓ Katie Wallace (Democratic) 74.8%; ▌Pat Miller (Republican) 25.2%
Senate	21	Dafna Michaelson Jenet	Democratic	2023 (appointed)	Incumbent resigned February 13, 2026, to take a job at the David Merage Foundation for Confronting Antisemitism. Interim appointee elected November 3, 2026. (Note: Adrienne Benavidez was appointed as interim senator by a vacancy committee on February 26, 2026.); Democratic hold.	▌ ✓ Adrienne Benavidez (Democratic) 63.7%; ▌Frederick Alfred Jr. (Republican) 36.3%
Senate	29	Janet Buckner	Democratic	2020	Incumbent resigned January 9, 2025, to prioritize her health. Interim appointee elected November 3, 2026. (Note: Iman Jodeh was appointed as interim senator by a vacancy committee on January 6, 2025.); Democratic hold.	▌ ✓ Iman Jodeh (Democratic) 71.5%; ▌Robert McKenna (Republican) 28.5%
Senate	31	Chris Hansen	Democratic	2020 (appointed)	Incumbent resigned January 9, 2025, to become CEO of La Plata Electric Association. Interim appointee elected November 3, 2026. (Note: Matthew Ball was appointed as interim senator by a vacancy committee on January 7, 2025.); Democratic hold.	▌ ✓ Matthew Ball (Democratic)

=== Connecticut ===
District		Incumbent			This race	
Chamber	No.	Representative	Party	First elected	Results	Candidates
House	25	Bobby Sanchez	Democratic	2010	Incumbent resigned November 12, 2025, to become mayor of New Britain. New member elected January 6, 2026. Democratic hold.	▌ ✓ Iris Sanchez (Democratic) 66.3%; ▌Jamie Vaughan (Republican) 33.7%
House	139	Kevin Ryan	Democratic	1992	Incumbent died November 23, 2025. New member elected January 13, 2026. Democratic hold.	▌▌ ✓ Larry Pemberton (Democratic) 64.5%; ▌Brandon Sabbag (Republican) 28.5%; ▌Mark Adams (Independent) 7.1%

=== District of Columbia ===
District		Incumbent			This race	
Chamber	No.	Representative	Party	First elected	Results	Candidates
Council	At-large	Kenyan McDuffie	Independent Democrat (Note: McDuffie previously was a member of the DC Council as a Democrat for Ward 8, but later sat as an independent due to restrictions on the number of majority party members in at-large seats; all candidates for this seat were similarly Democrats who resigned their membership to run.)	2022	Incumbent resigned January 5, 2026, to run for Mayor of Washington, D.C. New member elected June 16, 2026. (Note: Doni Crawford appointed as interim member on January 20, 2026.); Independent (Democratic) hold.	▌ ✓ Elissa Silverman (Independent) 55.4%; ▌Doni Crawford (Independent) 25.8%; ▌Jacque Patterson (Independent) 17.8%

=== Florida ===
District		Incumbent			This race	
Chamber	No.	Representative	Party	First elected	Results	Candidates
House	51	Josie Tomkow	Republican	2018 (special)	Incumbent resigned March 17, 2026, to run for State Senate. New member elected March 24, 2026. Republican hold.	▌ ✓ Hilary Holley (Republican) 54.2%; ▌Edwin Pérez (Democratic) 45.8%
House	52	John Temple	Republican	2022	Incumbent resigned September 18, 2025, to become the President of Lake–Sumter State College. New member elected outright after the March 24, 2026, general election was cancelled. Republican hold.	▌ ✓ Samantha Scott (Republican)
House	87	Mike Caruso	Republican	2018	Incumbent resigned August 18, 2025, to become the Clerk of the Circuit Court & Comptroller of Palm Beach County. New member elected March 24, 2026. Democratic gain.	▌ ✓ Emily Gregory (Democratic) 51.2%; ▌Jon Maples (Republican) 48.8%
Senate	14	Jay Collins	Republican	2022	Incumbent resigned August 12, 2025, to become the Lieutenant Governor of Florida. New member elected March 24, 2026. Democratic gain.	▌ ✓ Brian Nathan (Democratic) 50.3%; ▌Josie Tomkow (Republican) 49.7%
Senate	21	Ed Hooper	Republican	2018	Incumbent resigned November 3, 2026. New member elected November 3, 2026. Republican hold.	▌ ✓ Chris Nocco (Republican) 57.7%; ▌Jordan Hensley (Democratic) 42.3%

=== Georgia ===
District		Incumbent			This race	
Chamber	No.	Representative	Party	First elected	Results	Candidates
House	23	Mandi Ballinger	Republican	2012	Incumbent died October 12, 2025. New member elected January 6, 2026, after no candidate received over 50% of the vote on December 9, 2025. Republican hold.	▌ ✓ Bill Fincher (Republican) 71.4%; ▌Scott Sanders (Democratic) 28.6%
Senate	18	John Kennedy	Republican	2014	Incumbent resigned December 9, 2025, to focus on his lieutenant governor campaign. New member elected February 17, 2026, after no candidate received over 50% of the vote on January 20, 2026. Republican hold.	▌ ✓ Steven McNeel (Republican) 59.4%; ▌LeMario Brown (Democratic) 40.6%
House	94	Karen Bennett	Democratic	2012	Incumbent resigned January 1, 2026, after pleading guilty to making fraudulent statements to obtain benefits. New member elected April 7, 2026, after no candidate received over 50% of the vote on March 10, 2026. Democratic hold.	▌ ✓ Venola Mason (Democratic) 68.5%; ▌ Kelly Kautz (Democratic) 31.5%
House	130	Lynn Heffner	Democratic	2022	Incumbent resigned January 5, 2026, after moving out of the district. New member elected April 7, 2026, after no candidate received over 50% of the vote on March 10, 2026. Democratic hold.	▌ ✓ Sheila Nelson (Democratic) 70.7%; ▌Thomas McAdams (Republican) 29.3%
Senate	53	Colton Moore	Republican	2022	Incumbent resigned January 13, 2026, to run for U.S. House. New member elected April 7, 2026, after no candidate received over 50% of the vote on March 10, 2026. Republican hold.	▌ ✓ Lanny Thomas (Republican) 68.7%; ▌Jack Zibluk (Democratic) 31.3%
House	177	Dexter Sharper	Democratic	2012	Incumbent resigned March 9, 2026, after being charged with fraud. New member elected June 9, 2026, after no candidate received over 50% of the vote on May 12, 2026. Democratic hold.	▌ ✓ Alvin Payton Jr. (Democratic) 67.2%; ▌Eric Howard (Democratic) 32.8%
Senate	7	Nabilah Parkes	Democratic	2022	Incumbent resigned March 13, 2026, to focus on her lieutenant gubernatorial campaign. New member elected June 16, 2026, after no candidate received over 50% of the vote on May 19, 2026. Democratic hold.	▌ ✓ Adrienne White (Democratic) 51.1%; ▌Aizaz Shaikh (Republican) 48.9%

=== Hawaii ===
District		Incumbent			This race	
Chamber	No.	Representative	Party	First elected	Results	Candidates
House	43	Kanani Souza	Republican	2022	Special election ordered by the Hawaii Supreme Court after the primary resulted in a tie. Member re-elected November 3, 2026. Republican hold.	▌ ✓ Kanani Souza (Republican) 51.0%; ▌Sheila Medeiros (Republican) 49.0%
Senate	18	Michelle Kidani	Democratic	2008	Incumbent resigned June 30, 2026, due to health concerns. Interim appointee elected November 3, 2026. (Note: Danielle Bass was appointed as interim senator by the governor on August 9, 2026.); Democratic hold.	▌ ✓ Danielle Bass (Democratic) 54.8%; ▌Kelly P. Kitashima (Republican) 43.3%; ▌Max G. Hanna (Independent) 1.9%
Senate	19	Henry Aquino	Democratic	2022	Incumbent resigned November 30, 2025, to take a private sector job. Interim appointee elected November 3, 2026. (Note: Rachele Lamosao was appointed as interim senator by the governor, she was sworn in on January 21, 2026.); Democratic hold.	▌ ✓ Rachele Lamosao (Democratic) 67.1%; ▌Elijah Pierick (Republican) 32.9%

=== Kansas ===
District		Incumbent			This race	
Chamber	No.	Representative	Party	First elected	Results	Candidates
Senate	24	J. R. Claeys	Republican	2020	Incumbent resigned June 2, 2025, after being appointed director of the Rural Business-Cooperative Service. Interim appointee elected November 3, 2026. (Note: Scott Hill was appointed as interim senator on June 16, 2025.); Republican hold.	▌ ✓ Scott Hill (Republican)
Senate	25	Mary Ware	Democratic	2019 (appointed)	Incumbent resigned November 13, 2025. Interim appointee elected November 3, 2026. (Note: Silas Miller was appointed as interim senator on December 4, 2025.); Democratic hold.	▌ ✓ Silas Miller (Democratic) 68.0%; ▌Christopher Parisho (Republican) 32.0%

=== Louisiana ===
District		Incumbent			This race	
Chamber	No.	Representative	Party	First elected	Results	Candidates
House	37	Troy Romero	Republican	2019	Incumbent resigned December 14, 2025. New member elected February 7, 2026. Republican hold.	▌ ✓ Reese Broussard (Republican) 67.1%; ▌Ivy Woods (Independent) 31.2%; ▌Coy Myers (Republican) 1.7%
House	60	Chad Brown	Democratic	2015	Incumbent resigned November 18, 2025, to become commissioner of the Louisiana Office of Alcohol and Tobacco Control. New member elected February 7, 2026. Democratic hold.	▌ ✓ Chasity Martinez (Democratic) 62.0%; ▌Brad Daigle (Republican) 38.1%
House	97	Matthew Willard	Democratic	2019	Incumbent resigned January 12, 2026, to join the New Orleans City Council. New member elected February 7, 2026. Democratic hold.	▌ ✓ Ed Murray (Democratic) 52.3%; ▌Eugene Green (Democratic) 47.7%
House	100	Jason Hughes	Democratic	2019	Incumbent resigned December 14, 2025, to join the New Orleans City Council. New member elected March 14, 2026, after no candidate received over 50% of the vote on February 7, 2026. Democratic hold.	▌ ✓ Dana Henry (Democratic) 53.5%; ▌Kenya Rounds (Democratic) 46.5%
Senate	3	Joseph Bouie	Democratic	2019	Incumbent resigned October 15, 2025, to become chancellor of Southern University at New Orleans. New member elected March 14, 2026, after no candidate received over 50% of the vote on February 7, 2026. Democratic hold.	▌ ✓ Sidney Barthelemy II (Democratic) 63.8%; ▌Kenn Barnes (Democratic) 36.2%
House	69	Paula Davis	Republican	2015	Incumbent resigned January 9, 2026, to focus on her personal life. New member elected March 14, 2026. Republican hold.	▌ ✓ Paul Sawyer (Republican) 53.3%; ▌Angela Roberts (Democratic) 40.1%; ▌Lynn Coxe Graham (Republican) 3.7%; ▌Adam Beach (Republican) 2.9%
House	39	Julie Emerson	Republican	2015	Incumbent resigned February 11, 2026, after being appointed Chief of Staff by Governor Jeff Landry. New member elected outright after the May 16, 2026, general election was cancelled. Republican hold.	▌ ✓ Doyle Boudreaux (Republican)
House	92	Joseph A. Stagni	Republican	2017 (special)	Incumbent resigned June 30, 2026. New member elected November 3, 2026. Democratic gain.	▌ ✓ Gregory Carroll (Democratic) 57.6%; ▌Mike Sigur (Republican) 26.5%; ▌Alex Perdomo (Republican) 15.9%
Senate	14	Larry Selders	Democratic	2025 (special)	Incumbent died July 7, 2026. New member to be elected December 12, 2026.	▌Cleo Fields (Democratic); ▌Joel Porter (Independent)

=== Maine ===
District		Incumbent			This race	
Chamber	No.	Representative	Party	First elected	Results	Candidates
House	94	Kristen Cloutier	Democratic	2018	Incumbent resigned October 31, 2025, to become chief of staff to the Senate President. New member elected February 24, 2026. Democratic hold.	▌ ✓ Scott Harriman (Democratic) 53.2%; ▌Janet Beaudoin (Republican) 46.8%
House	29	Kathy Javner	Republican	2018	Incumbent died January 10, 2026, of cancer. New member elected June 9, 2026. Republican hold.	▌ ✓ Nancy Theriault (Republican) 62.8%; ▌Nancy McDowell (Democratic) 37.2%

=== Massachusetts ===
District		Incumbent			This race	
Chamber	No.	Representative	Party	First elected	Results	Candidates
Senate	Middlesex 1	Edward Kennedy	Democratic	2018	Incumbent died October 1, 2025. New member elected March 3, 2026. Democratic hold.	▌ ✓ Vanna Howard (Democratic) 58.2%; ▌Sam Meas (Republican) 23.0%; ▌Joseph Espinola (Independent) 18.6%
House	Essex 5	Ann-Margaret Ferrante	Democratic	2008	Incumbent died November 27, 2025. New member elected March 31, 2026. Democratic hold.	▌ ✓ Andrew Tarr (Democratic) 63.8%; ▌Christina Delisio (Republican) 28.9%; ▌Gilbert Frieden (Independent) 6.8%

=== Michigan ===
District		Incumbent			This race	
Chamber	No.	Representative	Party	First elected	Results	Candidates
Senate	35	Kristen McDonald Rivet	Democratic	2022	Incumbent resigned January 3, 2025, to become a U.S. representative. New member elected May 5, 2026. Democratic hold.	▌ ✓ Chedrick Greene (Democratic) 58.9%; ▌Jason Tunney (Republican) 39.4%; ▌Ali Sledz (Libertarian) 1.7%

=== Minnesota ===
District		Incumbent			This race	
Chamber	No.	Representative	Party	First elected	Results	Candidates
House	47A	Amanda Hemmingsen-Jaeger	DFL	2022	Incumbent resigned November 18, 2025, to join the State Senate. New member elected January 27, 2026. Democratic (DFL) hold.	▌ ✓ Shelley Buck (DFL) 97.6%; ▌Write-in 2.4%
House	64A	Kaohly Her	DFL	2018	Incumbent resigned November 17, 2025, to become the Mayor of Saint Paul. New member elected January 27, 2026. Democratic (DFL) hold.	▌ ✓ Meg Luger-Nikolai (DFL) 95.3%; ▌Dan Walsh (Republican) 4.4%

=== Mississippi ===
District		Incumbent			This race	
Chamber	No.	Representative	Party	First elected	Results	Candidates
House	70	Bo Brown	Democratic	2019	Incumbent died June 8, 2026. New member to be elected December 1, 2026, after no one received over 50% of the vote on November 3, 2026.	▌Marcus Cheatham (Nonpartisan); ▌James Lott III (Nonpartisan)
House	77	Price Wallace	Republican	2018 (special)	Incumbent died June 3, 2026. New member to be elected December 1, 2026, after no one received over 50% of the vote on November 3, 2026.	▌Christopher Dunn (Nonpartisan); ▌Melissa Sullivan (Nonpartisan)
Senate	34	Juan Barnett	Democratic	2015	Incumbent resigned August 31, 2026. New member to be elected December 22, 2026.	▌Johnny DuPree (Nonpartisan); ▌Kenneth Keyes (Nonpartisan); ▌Tiffany Lindsey (Nonpartisan); ▌Daryl McKines Jr. (Nonpartisan); ▌Bruce Pilgrim (Nonpartisan); ▌Nellie "Cookie" Satcher (Nonpartisan)

=== Nebraska ===
District		Incumbent			This race	
Chamber	No.	Representative	Party	First elected	Results	Candidates
Legislature	41	Dan McKeon	Republican (Note: The Nebraska Legislature is officially nonpartisan, but the political affiliations of its members and candidates are publicly known, which are reflected here)	2024	Incumbent resigned January 13, 2026, after facing expulsion for sexual misconduct. New member elected November 3, 2026. (Note: Fred Meyer was appointed as interim senator by Governor Jim Pillen on January 14, 2026.); Republican hold.	▌ ✓ Joe Johnson (Republican) 63.3%; ▌Jeremy Heneger (Democratic) 36.7%

=== New Hampshire ===
District		Incumbent			This race	
Chamber	No.	Representative	Party	First elected	Results	Candidates
House	Carroll 7	Glenn Cordelli	Republican	2012	Incumbent resigned November 12, 2025, after moving out of state. New member elected March 10, 2026. Democratic gain.	▌ ✓ Bobbi Boudman (Democratic) 51.8%; ▌Dale Fincher (Republican) 47.9%

=== New Mexico ===
District		Incumbent			This race	
Chamber	No.	Representative	Party	First elected	Results	Candidates
Senate	33	Nick Paul	Republican	2024	Incumbent resigned October 14, 2025, due to health concerns. Interim appointee elected November 3, 2026. (Note: Rex Wilson was appointed as interim senator by Governor Michelle Lujan Grisham on January 8, 2026.); Republican hold.	▌ ✓ Rex Wilson (Republican) 62.2%; ▌William Griffin (Democratic) 37.8%

=== New York ===
District		Incumbent			This race	
Chamber	No.	Representative	Party	First elected	Results	Candidates
Assembly	36	Zohran Mamdani	Democratic	2020	Incumbent resigned December 31, 2025, to become the Mayor of New York City. New member elected February 3, 2026. Democratic hold.	▌▌ ✓ Diana Moreno (Democratic) 74.1%; ▌Rana Abdelhamid (Queens For All) 17.1%; ▌Mary Jobaida (People First) 7.6%
Assembly	74	Harvey Epstein	Democratic	2018 (special)	Incumbent resigned December 3, 2025, to join the New York City Council. New member elected February 3, 2026. Democratic hold.	▌ ✓ Keith Powers (Democratic) 82.5%; ▌▌Joseph Foley (Republican) 16.5%
Senate	47	Brad Hoylman-Sigal	Democratic	2012	Incumbent resigned December 31, 2025, to become the Manhattan Borough President. New member elected February 3, 2026. Democratic hold.	▌▌ ✓ Erik Bottcher (Democratic) 91.7%; ▌Charlotte Friedman (Republican) 7.7%
Senate	61	Sean Ryan	Democratic	2020	Incumbent resigned December 31, 2025, to become the Mayor of Buffalo. New member elected February 3, 2026. Democratic hold.	▌ ✓ Jeremy Zellner (Democratic) 59.7%; ▌▌Dan Gagliardo (Republican) 39.8%

=== North Dakota ===
District		Incumbent			This race	
Chamber	No.	Representative	Party	First elected	Results	Candidates
House	20	Jared Hagert	Republican	2020	Incumbent resigned February 9, 2026, after being appointed to the Farm Service Agency. Interim appointee elected November 3, 2026. (Note: Dave Rustebakke was appointed as interim representative on April 11, 2026.); Republican hold.	▌ ✓ Dave Rustebakke (Republican) 67.1%; ▌Nikolaus Groenewald (Democratic-NPL) 32.9%
House	26	Jeremy Olson	Republican	2022	Incumbent resigned May 5, 2025, after being named in a harassment complaint. New member elected November 3, 2026. (Note: Kelby Timmons was appointed as interim representative on May 24, 2025.); Republican hold.	▌ ✓ Brent Schwan (Republican)
House	42	Emily O'Brien	Republican	2016	Incumbent resigned August 20, 2025, after being appointed deputy commissioner of the North Dakota Department of Health and Human Services. New member elected November 3, 2026. (Note: Dustin McNally was appointed as interim representative on September 14, 2025.); Democratic-NPL gain.	▌ ✓ Nicole Derenne (Democratic-NPL) 54.7%; ▌Connie Osowski (Republican) 45.3%

=== Oklahoma ===
District		Incumbent			This race	
Chamber	No.	Representative	Party	First elected	Results	Candidates
House	35	Ty Burns	Republican	2018	Incumbent resigned October 1, 2025, after being convicted of domestic abuse. New member elected February 10, 2026. Republican hold.	▌ ✓ Dillon Travis (Republican) 64.2%; ▌Luke Kruse (Democratic) 35.8%
House	92	Forrest Bennett	Democratic	2016	Incumbent resigned December 1, 2025, to become president of the Oklahoma AFL-CIO. New member elected outright after the November 3, 2026, general election was cancelled. Democratic hold.	▌ ✓ Sam Wargin Grimaldo (Democratic)
Senate	17	Shane Jett	Republican	2020	Incumbent resigned November 18, 2026, due to term limits. New member elected November 3, 2026. Republican hold.	▌ ✓ Justin Wood (Republican) 66.9%; ▌Ed Bolt (Democratic) 33.1%

=== Pennsylvania ===
District		Incumbent			This race	
Chamber	No.	Representative	Party	First elected	Results	Candidates
House	22	Joshua Siegel	Democratic	2022	Incumbent resigned December 17, 2025, to become the Lehigh County Executive. New member elected February 24, 2026. Democratic hold.	▌ ✓ Ana Tiburcio (Democratic) 67.3%; ▌Robert Smith (Republican) 32.7%
House	42	Dan Miller	Democratic	2013 (special)	Incumbent resigned December 17, 2025, to join the Allegheny County Court of Common Pleas. New member elected February 24, 2026. Democratic hold.	▌ ✓ Jennifer Mazzocco (Democratic) 81.7%; ▌Joseph Leckenby (Republican) 18.3%
House	79	Louis Schmitt Jr.	Republican	2018	Incumbent resigned December 31, 2025, to join the Blair County Court of Common Pleas. New member elected March 17, 2026. Republican hold.	▌ ✓ Andrea Verobish (Republican) 56.1%; ▌Caleb McCoy (Democratic) 43.9%
House	193	Torren Ecker	Republican	2018	Incumbent resigned December 30, 2025, to join the Adams County Court of Common Pleas. New member elected March 17, 2026. Republican hold.	▌ ✓ Catherine Wallen (Republican) 59.7%; ▌Todd Crawley (Democratic) 40.3%
House	196	Seth Grove	Republican	2008	Incumbent resigned January 31, 2026, to focus on employment in the private sector. New member elected May 19, 2026. Republican hold.	▌ ✓ George Margetas (Republican) 56.3%; ▌Ron Ruman (Democratic) 43.7%
House	12	Stephenie Scialabba	Republican	2022	Incumbent resigned March 31, 2026, to focus on her family. New member elected August 18, 2026. Democratic gain.	▌ ✓ Brandon Dukes (Democratic) 50.3%; ▌Scott Timko (Republican) 49.7%

=== South Carolina ===
District		Incumbent			This race	
Chamber	No.	Representative	Party	First elected	Results	Candidates
House	98	Chris Murphy	Republican	2010	Incumbent resigned January 5, 2026, to spend time with family. New member elected January 6, 2026. Republican hold.	▌ ✓ Greg Ford (Republican) 50.2%; ▌Sonja Ogletree Satani (Democratic) 49.6%
Senate	15	Wes Climer	Republican	2016	Incumbent resigned November 3, 2026, to run for U.S. House. New member elected November 3, 2026. Republican hold.	▌ ✓ James Burns (Republican) 53.7%; ▌Chad Williams (Democratic) 46.3%

=== Texas ===
District		Incumbent			This race	
Chamber	No.	Representative	Party	First elected	Results	Candidates
Senate	9	Kelly Hancock	Republican	2012	Incumbent resigned June 19, 2025, to become chief clerk of the Texas Comptroller of Public Accounts office. New member elected January 31, 2026, after no candidate received over 50% of the vote on November 4, 2025. Democratic gain.	▌ ✓ Taylor Rehmet (Democratic) 57.3%; ▌Leigh Wambsganss (Republican) 42.7%
Senate	4	Brandon Creighton	Republican	2014 (special)	Incumbent resigned October 3, 2025, to become chancellor of Texas Tech University. New member elected May 2, 2026. Republican hold.	▌ ✓ Brett Ligon (Republican) 75.1%; ▌Ron Angeletti (Democratic) 24.9%
House	93	Nate Schatzline	Republican	2022	Incumbent resigned July 2, 2026, after being appointed as a senior advisor on election integrity to Governor Greg Abbott. New member elected November 3, 2026. Democratic gain.	▌ ✓ Ericka Lomick (Democratic) 51.0%; ▌Alan Blaylock (Republican) 49.0%
Senate	22	Brian Birdwell	Republican	2010 (special)	Incumbent resigned May 26, 2026, after being confirmed as Assistant Secretary of Defense for Sustainment. New member elected November 3, 2026. Republican hold.	▌ ✓ David Cook (Republican) 54.9%; ▌Amy Martinez-Salas (Democratic) 44.0%

=== Virginia ===
District		Incumbent			This race	
Chamber	No.	Representative	Party	First elected	Results	Candidates
House	77	Michael Jones	Democratic	2023	Incumbent resigned December 9, 2025, to run for State Senate. New member elected January 6, 2026. Democratic hold.	▌ ✓ Charlie Schmidt (Democratic) 79.9%; ▌Richard Stonage Jr. (Republican) 19.9%
Senate	15	Ghazala Hashmi	Democratic	2019	Incumbent resigned January 17, 2026, to become the Lieutenant Governor of Virginia. New member elected January 6, 2026. Democratic hold.	▌ ✓ Michael Jones (Democratic) 70.8%; ▌John Thomas (Republican) 29.1%
House	11	David Bulova	Democratic	2005	Incumbent resigned January 17, 2026, to become the Virginia Secretary of Natural Resources. New member elected January 13, 2026. Democratic hold.	▌ ✓ Gretchen Bulova (Democratic) 69.7%; ▌Adam Wise (Republican) 29.9%
House	23	Candi King	Democratic	2021 (special)	Incumbent resigned January 17, 2026, to become the Secretary of the Commonwealth of Virginia. New member elected January 13, 2026. Democratic hold.	▌ ✓ Margaret Franklin (Democratic) 78.3%; ▌Verndell Robinson (Republican) 21.5%
House	17	Mark Sickles	Democratic	2003	Incumbent resigned January 17, 2026, to become the Virginia Secretary of Finance. New member elected January 20, 2026. Democratic hold.	▌ ✓ Garrett McGuire (Democratic) 78.9%; ▌Christopher Cardiff (Republican) 20.9%
House	5	Elizabeth Bennett-Parker	Democratic	2021	Incumbent resigned February 18, 2026, to run for State Senate. New member elected February 10, 2026. Democratic hold.	▌ ✓ Kirk McPike (Democratic) 82.2%; ▌Mason Butler (Republican) 17.3%
Senate	39	Adam Ebbin	Democratic	2011	Incumbent resigned February 18, 2026, to become a senior advisor at the Virginia Cannabis Control Authority. New member elected February 10, 2026. Democratic hold.	▌ ✓ Elizabeth Bennett-Parker (Democratic) 83.4%; ▌Julie Robben Lineberry (Republican) 16.3%
House	98	Barry Knight	Republican	2009 (special)	Incumbent died February 19, 2026. New member elected March 17, 2026. Republican hold.	▌ ✓ Andrew Rice (Republican) 59.4%; ▌Cheryl Smith (Democratic) 40.6%
House	20	Michelle Maldonado	Democratic	2021	Incumbent resigned May 31, 2026. New member elected November 3, 2026. Democratic hold.	▌ ✓ Sonia Vásquez Luna (Democratic) 70.0%; ▌Nate Fritzen (Republican) 30.0%

=== West Virginia ===
District		Incumbent			This race	
Chamber	No.	Representative	Party	First elected	Results	Candidates
Senate	3	Donna Boley	Republican	1985 (appointed)	Incumbent resigned January 8, 2026, to focus on health and family. Interim appointee elected November 3, 2026. (Note: Trenton Barnhart was appointed as interim senator by Governor Patrick Morrisey on January 27, 2026.); Republican hold.	▌ ✓ Trenton Barnhart (Republican) 73.9%; ▌Ronnie Green (Constitution) 26.1%
Senate	17	Eric Nelson	Republican	2020	Incumbent resigned January 13, 2025, after being appointed as West Virginia Secretary of Revenue. New member elected November 3, 2026. (Note: Anne Charnock was appointed as interim senator by Governor Patrick Morrisey on February 4, 2025.); Democratic gain.	▌ ✓ Richie Robb (Democratic) 53.2%; ▌Anne Charnock (Republican) 46.8%

=== Wyoming ===
District		Incumbent			This race	
Chamber	No.	Representative	Party	First elected	Results	Candidates
Senate	6	Darin Smith	Republican	2024	Incumbent resigned August 11, 2025, after being appointed as U.S. Attorney for the District of Wyoming. Interim appointee elected November 3, 2026. (Note: Taft Love was appointed as interim senator by county commissioners on August 29, 2025.); Republican hold.	▌ ✓ Taft Love (Republican)
