= 2026 Arkansas state legislative special elections =

US state elections

- 2026
	Majority party	Minority party	Third party
Party	Republican	Democratic	Independent
Popular vote	11,958	4,033	4,005
Percentage	59.80%	20.17%	20.03%
Seats up	3	0	0
Seats won	2	1	0
Seats change	▼1	▲1	Steady

As of August 7, 2026, three special elections to the U.S. state of Arkansas's state legislature, the Arkansas Legislature, were held in 2026: one to the Arkansas Senate in District 26, and teo to the Arkansas House of Representatives in District 44 and 70. Elections to District 26 and 70 were held on March 3, 2026, while that of District 44 was held on August 4, 2026. All the elections were originally scheduled to be held much later, sparking several lawsuits which were eventually consolidated. In November 2025, Governor of Arkansas Sarah Huckabee Sanders ordered the earlier two special elections to be moved to March after court orders.

== Arkansas Senate ==
=== District 26 ===
2026 Arkansas Senate District 26 special election
- March 3, 2026
Nominee	Brad Simon	Adam Watson
Party	Republican	Independent
Popular vote	8,922	4,005
Percentage	69.02%	30.98%
- Simon: 50–60% 60–70% 70–80%
Senator before election
Gary Stubblefield
Republican
Elected Senator
Brad Simon
Republican

A special election was made necessary in Senate District 26 by the death of Republican incumbent Gary Stubblefield on September 2, 2025. The general election will take place on March 3, 2026. Partisan primaries will be held on January 6 with a runoff election on February 3 if necessary. Political party candidates had until November 12, 2025 to file to run for the primary, and independents have until November 26, 2025 to file to run in the general election.

Governor Sarah Huckabee Sanders had originally planned to hold the special election alongside the general election in November 2026, 427 days after Stubblefield's death. Arkansas state law states that state legislative special elections must take within 150 days of the vacancy, unless the 150-day time frame is "impracticable or unduly burdensome". The original election date would have left the District 26 seat empty throughout the 2026 fiscal session. The decision received bipartisan pushback, with Republican primary candidates Brad Simon, Ted Tritt, and the chair of the Arkansas Democratic Party all condemning the date.

It was later revised to take place on June 9, 280 days after the vacancy. This date still far exceeded the 150-day legal deadline by which the election needed to be held, under the June schedule a new member would still not be sworn in before the end of the 2026 fiscal session. Of the 17 special elections called since 2011 to fill vacancies in the state legislature, only eight have been held within that 150-day window, with the other eight only exceeding it by about a month. Both the 427-day and 280-day wait to till Stubblefield's vacancy was longer than any other special election called since 2011, with the 280-day wait being 91 days longer than the previous longest date.

After the election date was moved to June 9, 2026, Franklin County resident Colt Shelby filed a lawsuit stating the election date violated state law. On October 22, 2025, 6th Circuit Court Judge Patti James ruled in Shelby's favor and ordered an earlier election date. Sarah Huckabee Sanders and Arkansas Secretary of State Cole Jester attempted to appeal the decision to the Arkansas Supreme Court, but the Court denied Sanders' and Jester's stay, leaving the lower court's ruling standing.

On November 16, Sanders complied with the court order and moved the election dates to March 3, 2026. Sanders remained defiant, repeatedly calling the decision an "unlawful order" in her proclamation moving the election dates.

Senate District 26 is located in Western Arkansas and contains parts of the counties of Franklin, Johnson, Logan, and Sebastian. Municipalities with populations above 1,000 in the district include Booneville, Charleston, Clarksville, Greenwood, Lamar, Lavaca, Ozark, Paris, and parts of Barling and Fort Smith. Stubblefield was re-elected in 2022 with 83.78 percent of the vote over a Libertarian opponent.

==== Republican primary ====
===== Candidates =====
====== Nominee ======
- Brad Simon, businessman

====== Eliminated in runoff ======
- Wade Dunn, businessman

====== Eliminated in first round ======
- Mark Berry, former member of the Arkansas House of Representatives (2021–2025) from the 82nd district (2021–2023) and the 26th district (2023–2025)
- Stacie Smith, community affairs coordinator
- Ted Tritt, oil businessman

====== Disqualified ======
- Brenda Brewer, District 11 justice of the peace and Logan County Republican Party official

===== Results =====
2026 Arkansas Senate District 26 special election, Republican primary
Party	Candidate	Votes	%
Republican	Wade Dunn	2,293	37.36%
Republican	Brad Simon	1,896	30.89%
Republican	Mark H. Berry	836	13.62%
Republican	Stacie Smith	572	9.32%
Republican	Ted Tritt	540	8.80%
Total votes		6,137	100.00%

===== Runoff =====
====== Results ======
Republican primary runoff
Party	Candidate	Votes	%
Republican	Brad Simon	3,632	65.05%
Republican	Wade Dunn	1,951	34.95%
Total votes		5,583	100.00%

==== Independent candidates ====
===== Declared =====
- Adam Watson, farmer and paralegal

==== Results ====
2026 Arkansas House of Representatives District 70 special election
Party	Candidate	Votes	%	±%
Republican	Brad Simon	8,922	69.02%	−30.98%
Independent	Adam Watson	4,005	30.98%	+30.98%
Total votes		12,927	100.00	
Republican hold				

County	Brad Simon Republican		Adam Watson Independent		Margin		Total votes cast
County	#	%	#	%	#	%	Total votes cast
Franklin (part)	1,156	53.57%	1,002	46.43%	154	7.14%	2,158
Johnson (part)	2,088	71.51%	832	28.49%	1,256	43.02%	2,920
Logan (part)	2,737	75.69%	879	24.31%	1,858	51.38%	3,616
Sebastian (part)	2,941	69.48%	1,292	30.52%	1,649	38.96%	4,233
Totals	8,922	69.02%	4,005	30.98%	4,917	38.04%	12,927

== Arkansas House of Representatives ==
=== District 44 ===
2026 Arkansas House of Representatives District 44 special election
- August 4, 2026
Nominee	Bill Teeter
Party	Republican
Popular vote	41
Percentage	100.00%
Representative before election
Stan Berry
Republican
Elected Representative
Bill Teeter
Republican

A special election for District 44 was set to be held on August 4, 2026, to fill the vacancy left by the death of Rep. Stan Berry. Primaries was held on June 2. If required, a primary runoff election was held on June 30. Political party candidates had until April 20 to file to run for the primary, and independents had until April 24 to file to run in the general election. Since all four candidates were Republicans, new Rep. was decided after primary, in which Bill Teeter won in the runoff.

==== Republican primary ====
===== Candidates =====
====== Nominee ======
- Bill Teeter

====== Eliminated in runoff ======
- Nikki Phillips (withdrew before runoff, remained on ballot)

====== Eliminated in first round ======
- Brent Boland
- Wes Freeman

===== Results =====
2026 Arkansas House of Representatives District 44 special election, Republican primary
Party	Candidate	Votes	%
Republican	Bill Teeter	605	30.93%
Republican	Nikki Phillips	532	27.20%
Republican	Brent Boland	498	25.46%
Republican	Wes Freeman	321	16.41%
Total votes		1,956	100.00%

2026 Arkansas House of Representatives District 44 special election, Republican primary runoff
Party	Candidate	Votes	%
Republican	Bill Teeter	279	92.08%
Republican	Nikki Phillips	24	7.92%
Total votes		303	100.00%

==== General election ====
2026 Arkansas House of Representatives District 44 special election
Party	Candidate	Votes	%
Republican	Bill Teeter	41	100.00%
Total votes		41	100.00%
Republican hold			

County	Bill Teeter Republican		Margin		Total votes cast
County	#	%	#	%	Total votes cast
Pope (part)	38	100.00%	38	100.00%	38
Van Buren (part)	3	100.00%	3	100.00%	3
Totals	41	100.00%	41	100.00%	41

=== District 70 ===
2026 Arkansas House of Representatives District 70 special election
- March 3, 2026
Nominee	Alex Holladay	Bo Renshaw
Party	Democratic	Republican
Popular vote	4,033	2,995
Percentage	57.38%	42.62%
Representative before election
Carlton Wing
Republican
Elected Representative
Alex Holladay
Democratic

A special election was made necessary in House District 70 by the resignation of Republican incumbent Carlton Wing on September 30, 2025, to become executive director of Arkansas PBS. The general election took place on March 3, 2026. Partisan primaries were held on January 6 with a runoff election on February 3 if necessary. Political party candidates had until November 12, 2025 to file to run for the primary, and independents have until November 26, 2025 to file to run in the general election.

Similarly to the Senate District 26 election, the special election was scheduled to take place after the 2026 fiscal session of the Legislature. Its lawsuits were consolidated with the SD 26 case, and the elections were ordered to be moved earlier in the year.

House District 70 is located entirely within Pulaski County in the Little Rock metropolitan area, containing parts Gibson, North Little Rock, and Sherwood. Republican Carlton Wing was re-elected in 2024 with 50.97 percent over the vote against a Democratic opponent. District 70 was one of the two closest Arkansas state house races in 2024, leading many to predict a Democratic victory in the special election, given the party's recent performances in other special elections across the country. While a Democratic victory would barely make a dent in the Republican majority in the House of Representatives, it could factor into negotiations for appropriations legislation, which requires a 75% supermajority to pass in each chamber.

==== Democratic primary ====
===== Candidates =====
====== Nominee ======
- Alex Holladay, nominee for this district in 2024

====== Eliminated in primary ======
- Cordelia Smith-Johnson

===== Results =====
2026 Arkansas House of Representatives District 70 special election, Democratic primary
Party	Candidate	Votes	%
Democratic	Alex Holladay	641	79.63%
Democratic	Cordelia Smith-Johnson	164	20.37%
Total votes		805	100.00%

==== Nominee ====
- Bo Renshaw, physical therapist

==== Results ====
2026 Arkansas House of Representatives District 70 special election
Party	Candidate	Votes	%	±%
Democratic	Alex Holladay	4,033	57.38%	+8.35%
Republican	Bo Renshaw	2,995	42.62%	−8.35%
Total votes		7,028	100.00	
Turnout		20,935	33.57%	
Democratic gain from Republican				
