= 2026 Arkansas elections =

A general election was held in the U.S. state of Arkansas on November 3, 2026 for all executive offices, all four of the state's seats in the United States House of Representatives, and a U.S. senator. Primaries were held on March 3, 2026, with runoff primaries on March 31. While Arkansas used to be a Democratic stronghold, (with Bill Clinton winning it twice with very comfortable margins), Arkansas is now among the most red states in the country. A Democrat has not won state-wide since 2010, when former governor Mike Beebe won re-election. Moreover, Democrats only filed to run for governor and secretary of state.

Major party candidates had until November 11, 2025 to submit their candidacies to appear on the primary election ballot. Candidates for newly-created political parties have until March 3, 2026, primary election day, to file to appear on the general election ballot, and independent candidates have until May 1, 2026 to petition to be placed on the ballot. The Libertarian Party of Arkansas has declared its intention to field candidates for Arkansas offices, submitting a petition to qualify for the general election ballot in November 2025.

== Governor ==
Incumbent Republican Governor Sarah Huckabee Sanders has declared her intention to run for a second term. She is the daughter of former Governor Mike Huckabee and was one of President Trump's press secretaries in his first term. She easily won her first election in 2022 with 62.96% of the vote.

Two candidates sought the Democratic Party of Arkansas gubernatorial nomination in a March 3 primary: State Senator Fred Love, who won the race, and Supha Xayprasith-Mays. The Libertarian Party of Arkansas will nominate a candidate at their convention.

== Lieutenant Governor ==
Incumbent Lieutenant Governor, Leslie Rutledge is running for a second term, and will face Libertarian Michael Kalagias. She also easily won her first election in 2022, with 64.21% of the vote.

== Secretary of State ==
Incumbent Secretary of State John Thurston resigned from his office after being elected in 2024 as State Treasurer. The new appointee, Cole Jester, is unable to run for a full term, leading to an open seat in 2026.

== Attorney General ==
Incumbent Attorney General, Tim Griffin, has declared his intentions to run for a second term. He won in 2022 with 67.61% of the vote.

== State Treasurer ==
Incumbent Treasurer John Thurston has declared his intention to run for his first full term. He was elected in a special election in 2024 with 65.37% of the vote after then incumbent Mark Lowery died in office.

== State Auditor ==
Incumbent Auditor Dennis Milligan has declared his intention to run for a second term. He won in 2022 with 66.79% of the vote.

== Commissioner of State Lands ==
Incumbent Land Commissioner Tommy Land is term-limited and cannot run for re-election. The incumbent Secretary of State, Cole Jester, has announced his candidacy for this position. He is challenged in the Republican primary by Christian Olson, real estate investor, former state government official, and Asa Hutchinson campaign staffer. Land did not plan to make an endorsement in the race, and no Democrat filed for the position.

== United States Senate ==
Incumbent senator Tom Cotton from Arkansas has declared his intention to run for a third-term. He is the third-highest ranking Republican in the Senate. He won his last election in 2020 with 66.53% of the vote against a Libertarian.

== United States House of Representatives ==
=== District 1 ===
Republican incumbent Rick Crawford is running for a 9th term against Democrat Terri Yarbrough Green. He won his last election in 2024 with 72.9% of the vote.

=== District 2 ===
Republican incumbent French Hill is running for a 7th term against Democrat Chris Jones. He won his last election with 58.9% of the vote.

=== District 3 ===
Republican incumbent Steve Womack is running for a 9th term against Democrat Robb Ryerse. He won his last election with 63.8% of the vote.

=== District 4 ===
Republican incumbent Bruce Westerman is running for a 7th term against Democrat James Russell. He won his last election with 72.9% of the vote.

== State legislature ==
=== Arkansas Senate ===
==== Senate special elections ====
District	County(ies)	Contest	Incumbent	Winner	Result	Cause
26th	Franklin (p); Johnson (p); Logan (p); Sebastian (p)	March 3, 2026	Gary Stubblefield (R)	Brad Simon (R)	Rep Hold.	Incumbent senator died September 2, 2025.

=== Arkansas House of Representatives ===
==== House special elections ====
District	County(ies)	Contest	Incumbent	Winner	Result	Cause
70th	Pulaski (p)	March 3, 2026	Carlton Wing (R)	Alex Holladay (D)	Democratic gain	Incumbent representative resigned September 30, 2025, to become executive director of Arkansas PBS.
44th	Pope (p) and Van Buren (p)	August 4, 2026	Stan Berry (R)	Bill Teeter (R)	Republican hold	Incumbent representative passed away March 23, 2026.

== Ballot measures ==
=== Issue 1 ===
The, "Creation of Economic Development Districts Amendment" would "Allow the legislature to create programs, including Economic Development Districts, and make loans and grants of public money to develop the state economy".

=== Issue 2 ===
The "Citizenship Requirement for Voting Amendment" would "Provide that only U.S. citizens may vote in state or local elections".

=== Issue 3 ===
The "Natural Resources Commission Bond Measure" would "Authorize the Arkansas Natural Resources Commission to issue up to $500 million in general obligation bonds to fund water-related infrastructure projects including water treatment and transportation, waste disposal, pollution abatement, drainage, irrigation, flood control, and wetlands and aquatic resources infrastructure".

=== Issue 4 ===
The "Right to Keep and Bear Arms Amendment" would "Create a right to keep and bear arms without limitation on the possession and use of ammunition, firearm accessories, or firearm components".

== Notes ==
*issues in no particular order
