= Charlene Fite =

American politician

Member of the Arkansas House of Representatives from the 24th district
- In office January 9, 2023 – January 13, 2025
- Preceded by: Bruce Cozart
- Succeeded by: Brad Hall

Member of the Arkansas House of Representatives from the 80th district
- In office January 14, 2013 – January 9, 2023
- Preceded by: Linda Collins-Smith
- Succeeded by: Denise Jones Ennett

Personal details
- Born: 1950 (age 75–76) Alma, Arkansas
- Party: Republican
- Spouse: Tom Fite
- Children: 6
- Education: University of Tennessee; University of Arkansas; Taipei Language Institute
- Profession: Psychology specialist

Charlene Fite (born 1950) is an American politician and former Republican member of the Arkansas House of Representatives.

== Early life and education ==
Fite was born in Alma, Arkansas. She has a B.S. in deaf education from the University of Tennessee in 2000, an M.S.Ed. in special education from the University of Arkansas, and attended the Taipei Language Institute.

== Career ==
Fife is a retired school psychology specialist. She was first elected to the House in 2012 and was re-elected through 2024, when she declined to seek re-election. Her last campaign focused on economic growth; she favors less government regulation to help economic development. She is chairperson of the Aging, Children and Youth, Legislative and Military Affairs Committee; and, vice-chair of ALC-Hospital and Medicaid Subcommittee. Fite has served on the Board of Court Appointed Special Advocates in Crawford County, the Board of Children's Advocacy Centers of Arkansas, and the Board for Bost Development Centers.

In November 2025, Fite filed to challenge her successor Brad Hall in the Republican primary, alongside Melissa Koller. Hall withdrew days after the filing deadline.

== Personal ==
She lives in Van Buren, Arkansas, and is married to Tom Fite, with six children and seven grandchildren. While in language school in Taiwan, she appeared twice on Chinese language television.
