= Sonja Ogletree Satani =

American politician

Member of the South Carolina House of Representatives from the 98th district
- Incumbent
- Assumed office December 2026
- Preceded by: Greg Ford

Personal details
- Party: Democratic

Sonja Ogletree Satani is an American politician. She is a member-elect of the South Carolina House of Representatives from the 98th District (parts of Dorchester Country).

== Early life, education and career ==
Ogletree Satani is an Air Force veteran and a professor of business management at ECPI University in Lexington County. She runs a North Charleston-based business consulting firm.

== Political career ==
Ogletree Satani was a Democratic candidate for SC House District 98 in 2024, losing to Republican incumbent Chris Murphy by 12 points.

On August 20, 2025, Murphy submitted his resignation from the 98th District House seat effective January 5, 2026, leading to a special election.

=== 2026 Special election ===
The South Carolina State Election Commission published special election dates, with a November 4, 2025 primary and a January 6, 2026 Special election, where Ogletree Satani and Republican Greg Ford faced each other.

The unofficial tally placed Ford at 50.2% and Ogletree Satani at 49.6% with a difference of 21 votes, triggering a recount. The race generated national attention, with scrutiny on districts where President Donald Trump won by double digits in the 2024 election. Ogletree Satani declined to concede ahead of the recount.

Dorchester County certified the results of the vote on Friday, January 9, 2026. Afterward, the State Election Commission issued an order for Dorchester County voter registration and elections office to conduct a recount, which took place on the same day and didn't change the result, officially giving Ford a win by 21 votes.

=== 2026 South Carolina House of Representatives election ===
Ogletree Satani defeated Republican incumbent Greg Ford in a rematch in the general election.
