= Kendra Moore =

American politician

Member of the Arkansas House of Representatives from the 23rd district
- Incumbent
- Assumed office January 9, 2023
- Preceded by: Lanny Fite

Personal details
- Party: Republican
- Spouse: Josh
- Children: 2 sons
- Education: University of Arkansas (BS); John Brown University (MBA)

Kendra Moore is an American politician who has served as a member of the Arkansas House of Representatives since January 9, 2023. She represents Arkansas' 23rd House district.

== Electoral history ==
She was elected on November 8, 2022, in the 2022 Arkansas House of Representatives election against Libertarian opponent Ryan Hanson. She assumed office on January 9, 2023.

== Biography ==
Moore earned a bachelor's degree from the University of Arkansas and a Master of Business Administration from John Brown University. She has served on the board of education of the Lincoln Consolidated School District. She and her husband, Josh, have two sons.
