= Jon S. Eubanks =

American politician

Jon Eubanks

Speaker pro tempore of the Arkansas House of Representatives
- In office January 12, 2015 – January 13, 2025
- Preceded by: Darrin Williams
- Succeeded by: Carlton Wing

Member of the Arkansas House of Representatives from the 74th district
- Incumbent
- Assumed office January 10, 2011
- Preceded by: Butch Wilkins

Personal details
- Born: Portsmouth, Virginia, U.S.
- Party: Republican
- Education: Arkansas Tech University (BS)

Jon S. Eubanks is an American politician, farmer, and accountant serving as a member of the Arkansas House of Representatives from the 74th district. First elected in 2010, he also served as speaker pro tempore of the House.

== Early life and education ==
Eubanks was born in Portsmouth, Virginia and graduated from Annapolis High School in 1969. He attended Virginia Tech and earned a Bachelor of Science degree in accounting from Arkansas Tech University in 1990.

== Career ==
Outside of politics, Eubanks has worked as a farmer and Certified Public Accountant. He previously served on the board of the Paris School District.

Arkansas House of Representatives
Preceded by Darrin Williams	Speaker pro tempore of the Arkansas House of Representatives; 2015–2025	Succeeded by Carlton Wing
