= Brad Hall (politician) =

American politician

Member of the Arkansas House of Representatives from the 24th district
- Incumbent
- Assumed office January 13, 2025
- Preceded by: Charlene Fite

Personal details
- Party: Republican
- Education: University of Arkansas

Brad Hall is an American politician representing the 24th district in the Arkansas House of Representatives.

== Political career ==
Hall succeeded longtime Republican Charlene Fite, who did not seek re-election, by defeating Ty Bates in the Republican primary and Ryan Intchauspe (D) in the 2024 general election. He was seated in the 95th Arkansas General Assembly on January 13, 2025.

After initially seeking reelection in November 2025, Hall withdrew days after the filing deadline and shortly after an Arkansas Democrat-Gazette report detailing allegations he forced his wife to have sex with other men, including one who repeatedly raped her. Hall later told KNWA he withdrew to focus on his divorce proceedings.

== Personal life ==
Hall is a cattle rancher and owner of a storage business. He lives in Rudy, Arkansas with his wife and their three children.
