= Cameron Cooper =

American politician from Arkansas

Member of the Arkansas House of Representatives from the 44th district
- In office January 2019 – January 9, 2023
- Preceded by: Joe Farrer
- Succeeded by: Stan Berry

White County Justice of the Peace
- In office 2005–2018

Member of the Arkansas House of Representatives from the 57th district
- Incumbent
- Assumed office January 9, 2023
- Preceded by: Jimmy Gazaway

Personal details
- Party: Republican
- Education: Arkansas State University at Beebe; Harding University
- Occupation: Manager, farmer

Cameron Cooper is an American politician who is a member of the Arkansas House of Representatives from the 57th district.
