= Greg Ford (South Carolina politician) =

American politician

Member of the South Carolina House of Representatives from the 98th district
- Incumbent
- Assumed office January 13, 2026
- Preceded by: Chris Murphy
- Succeeded by: Sonja Ogletree Satani

Personal details
- Born: Charlotte, North Carolina
- Party: Republican
- Website: votegregford.com

Greg Ford is an American politician. He is a member of the South Carolina House of Representatives from the 98th District (parts of Dorchester Country).

== Political career ==
Ford was a primary candidate for SC House District 98 in 2022 and 2024.

On August 20, 2025, Republican incumbent Chris Murphy submitted his resignation from the 98th District House seat, effective January 5, 2026, leading to a special election.

=== 2026 Special election ===
The South Carolina State Election Commission published special election dates, with a November 4, 2025 primary and a January 6, 2026 Special election, where Ford and Democrat Sonja Ogletree Satani faced each other. She was also a candidate in 2022, losing to Chris Murphy by 12 points.

The unofficial tally placed Ford at 50.2% and Ogletree Satani at 49.6% with a difference of 21 votes, triggering a recount. The race generated national attention, with scrutiny on districts where President Donald Trump won by double digits in the 2024 election. Ogletree Satani declined to concede ahead of the recount.

Dorchester County certified the results of the vote on Friday, January 9, 2026. Afterward, the State Election Commission issued an order for Dorchester County voter registration and elections office to conduct a recount, which took place on the same day and didn't change the result, officially giving Ford a win by 21 votes.

=== 2026 South Carolina House of Representatives election ===
Ford was defeated in a rematch with Ogletree Satani in the general election.
