= Alex Holladay =

American politician

Member of the Arkansas House of Representatives from the 70th district
- Incumbent
- Assumed office March 20, 2026
- Preceded by: Carlton Wing

Personal details
- Party: Democratic

Alex Holladay is an American politician from Arkansas. He is a member of the Arkansas House of Representatives representing the 70th district. He is a Democrat.

== Career ==
Prior to his political career, Holladay worked a recruiter at the University of Arkansas for Medical Sciences.

In 2024, Holladay ran against Republican incumbent Carlton Wing in the 70th district of the Arkansas House of Representatives. Wing narrowly won the election with 50.97% of the vote.

Holladay ran for the seat again after Wing resigned from his position to become the executive director of Arkansas PBS in September 2025. Holladay defeated Republican Bo Renshaw in a March 2026 special election.

Holladay was sworn in on March 20, 2026.
