= Brian S. Evans =

American politician

Brian Evans

Speaker of the Arkansas House of Representatives
- Incumbent
- Assumed office January 13, 2025
- Preceded by: Matthew Shepherd

Member of the Arkansas House of Representatives
- Incumbent
- Assumed office January 14, 2019
- Preceded by: Tim Lemons
- Constituency: 43rd district (2019–2023); 68th district (2023–present)

Personal details
- Born: 1967 or 1968 (age 57–58) Arkansas, U.S.
- Party: Republican
- Education: University of Central Arkansas (attended); Arkansas State University (attended)

Brian S. Evans (born 1967/1968) is an American politician serving as a member of the Arkansas House of Representatives from the 68th district. Evans was elected in 2018 to represent the 43rd district. He was elected as speaker for the 2025 legislative session.

In his first term (92nd Arkansas General Assembly), Evans served on the following committees:

- Academic Facilities Oversight Committee
- Joint Performance Review Committee
- Aging, Children and Youth, Legislative and Military Affairs Committee
- House Education Committee

In his second term (93rd Arkansas General Assembly), Evans served on the following committees:

- House Education Committee, Vice-chairman
- House Insurance and Commerce Committee
- Public Retirement and Social Security Programs Committee

Evans also serves on the Cabot Public School District School board.

== Education and business career ==
Evans attended the University of Central Arkansas and Arkansas State University. Following graduation, Evans began to work as part of the logistics division of L & L Freight Services, Inc; eventually becoming a member of the board of the Transportation Intermediaries Association.

== Personal life ==
Evans lives in Cabot, Arkansas, alongside his wife and two children.

Arkansas House of Representatives
Preceded by Matthew Shepherd	Speaker of the Arkansas House of Representatives; 2025–present	Incumbent
