= Chris Murphy (South Carolina politician) =

American politician (1968–2026)

Member of the South Carolina House of Representatives from the 98th district
- In office 2011 – January 5, 2026
- Preceded by: Annette D. Young
- Succeeded by: Greg Ford

Personal details
- Born: May 31, 1968 Honolulu, Hawaii, U.S.
- Died: July 22, 2026 (aged 58) Summerville, South Carolina, U.S.
- Party: Republican
- Spouse: Maite' D. (m. 1994)
- Children: 2
- Education: The Citadel (B.A., 1990), Mississippi College (J.D., 1995)
- Profession: Attorney

Christopher John Murphy (May 31, 1968 – July 22, 2026) was an American politician. He was a member of the South Carolina House of Representatives from the 98th District (parts of Dorchester Country), serving since 2011 until his resignation in 2026. He was a member of the Republican party. In 2025, Murphy resigned his seat, effective January 2026.

== Early life, education and career ==
Murphy was born in Honolulu, Hawaii on May 31, 1968, to Barbara and Patrick Murphy. They raised him in Summerville, South Carolina, where he attended Summerville High School. In 1990, he received his B.A. from the Citadel, and he received his J.D. from Mississippi College in 1995.

Prior to his political career, Murphy worked as a prosecutor with the First Judicial Circuit of South Carolina. During this time, he worked under Walter M. Bailey, Jr. who was Solicitor at that time.

== Political career ==
=== Local elected office ===
Murphy served on Dorchester County Council from 2002 to 2010, as its Chairman in 2005.

=== South Carolina State House ===
Murphy was a member of the South Carolina House of Representatives from the 98th District (parts of Dorchester Country), having served from 2011 until January 2026. He served on the House Ways and Means Committee.

=== 2025 resignation ===
On August 20, 2025, Murphy submitted his resignation from the 98th District House seat, effective January 5, 2026.

== Electoral data ==
=== 2010 South Carolina House of Representatives ===
South Carolina House of Representatives District 98, Republican Primary, 2010
Party	Candidate	Votes	%
Republican	Chris Murphy	2,491	52.5
Republican	Larry Hargett	2,256	47.5
Total votes		4,747	100.0

South Carolina House of Representatives District 98 General Election, 2010
Party	Candidate	Votes	%
Republican	Chris Murphy	8,318	63.0
Democratic	Christine Jackson	4,877	36.9
Other	Write-in	16	0.1
Total votes		13,211	100.0
Republican hold			

=== 2012 South Carolina House of Representatives ===
Murphy ran uncontested in his primary and general election in 2012.

=== 2014 South Carolina House of Representatives ===
The Republican primary featured a repeat challenge from Larry Hargett.

South Carolina House of Representatives District 98, Republican Primary, 2014
Party	Candidate	Votes	%
Republican	Chris Murphy	1,367	52.8
Republican	Larry Hargett	1,220	47.2
Total votes		2,587	100.0

South Carolina House of Representatives District 98 General Election, 2014
Party	Candidate	Votes	%
Republican	Chris Murphy	5,482	62.8
Democratic	Rebekah Patrick	3,222	36.9
Other	Write-in	24	0.3
Total votes		8,728	100.0
Republican hold			

=== 2016 South Carolina House of Representatives ===
Murphy ran uncontested in his primary and general election in 2016.

=== 2018 South Carolina House of Representatives ===
The Republican primary featured a repeat challenge from Larry Hargett.

South Carolina House of Representatives District 98, Republican Primary, 2018
Party	Candidate	Votes	%
Republican	Chris Murphy	1,729	60.3
Republican	Larry Hargett	1,138	39.7
Total votes		2,867	100.0

Murphy ran uncontested in the general election.

=== 2020 South Carolina House of Representatives ===
Murphy ran uncontested in his primary and general election in 2020.

=== 2022 South Carolina House of Representatives ===
South Carolina House of Representatives District 98, Republican Primary, 2022
Party	Candidate	Votes	%
Republican	Chris Murphy	1,819	68.3
Republican	Greg Ford	845	31.7
Total votes		2,664	100.0

South Carolina House of Representatives District 98 General Election, 2022
Party	Candidate	Votes	%
Republican	Chris Murphy	6,770	57.8
Democratic	Sydney Clinton	4,925	42.1
Other	Write-in	14	0.1
Total votes		11,709	100.0
Republican hold			

== Personal life and death ==
Murphy was married to Maite' D., and had two children. He was an Episcopalian. Murphy died at his home in Summerville, on July 22, 2026, at the age of 58.
