= Stan Berry =

American politician (1954–2026)

Stan J. Berry

Member of the Arkansas House of Representatives from the 44th district
- In office January 9, 2023 – March 23, 2026
- Preceded by: Cameron Cooper
- Succeeded by: Bill Teeter

Member of the Arkansas House of Representatives from the 68th district
- In office January 1, 2019 – January 1, 2023
- Preceded by: Trevor Drown
- Succeeded by: Brian S. Evans

Member of the Arkansas House of Representatives
- In office January 5, 2003 – December 31, 2008

Personal details
- Born: May 20, 1954 Dover, Arkansas, U.S.
- Died: March 23, 2026 (aged 71) Dover, Arkansas, U.S.
- Party: Republican
- Spouse: Mona
- Children: 4
- Education: Arkansas Tech University

Stanley Jack Berry (May 20, 1954 – March 23, 2026) was an American politician who served as a member of the Arkansas House of Representatives between 2003 and 2026. He was a Republican, and represented Arkansas' 44th House district at the time of his death.

== Electoral history ==
Berry was first elected to the house in 2002, and assumed office January 5, 2003. He was reelected in 2004 and 2006. He left office on December 31, 2008. In 2015, he ran for the 16th Senate district, but lost to Greg Standridge. He was elected to the house to the 68th district unopposed in the 2018 Arkansas House of Representatives election. He was reelected in the 2020 Arkansas House of Representatives election against democratic opponent Lisa Hassell. He was elected unopposed to the 44th district in the 2022 Arkansas House of Representatives election due to redistricting.

== Personal life and death ==
Berry was born in Dover, Arkansas, on May 20, 1954. He served in the National Guard. He also served on the Dover School Board and the Dover City Council. He was a Presbyterian. He graduated from Arkansas Tech University.

Berry died at his home in Dover on March 23, 2026, at the age of 71.
