= Brad Simon (politician) =

American politician

Member of the Arkansas Senate from the 26th district
- Incumbent
- Assumed office March 4, 2026
- Preceded by: Gary Stubblefield

Personal details
- Party: Republican
- Website: www.simonforstate.com

Brad C. Simon is an American politician who has been a member of the Arkansas State Senate for the 26th district since a 2026 special election. Simon is a small business owner.
