= Arkansas House of Representatives =

Lower house of the Arkansas General Assembly

Coordinates: 34°44′49″N 92°17′21″W

- 95th Arkansas General Assembly

Type
- Type: Lower house
- Term limits: Members first elected on or before November 3, 2020: 16 years (consecutive or non-consecutive, both houses), eligible to run again 4 years after their last term ends. Members first elected after November 3, 2020: 12 years (consecutive, both houses), eligible to run again 4 years after their last term ends.

History
- Founded: January 30, 1836
- New session started: January 15, 2025

Leadership
- Speaker: Brian S. Evans (R) since January 15, 2025
- Speaker pro tempore: Vacant (Note: Carlton Wing resigned to become executive director of Arkansas PBS.) since September 30, 2025
- Majority Leader: Howard M. Beaty Jr. (R) since January 15, 2025
- Minority Leader: Andrew Collins (D) since January 15, 2025

Structure
- Seats: 100
- Political groups: Majority: Republican (79); Minority: Democratic (20); Vacant: Vacant (1)
- Length of term: 2 years
- Authority: Article 8, Section 2, Arkansas Constitution
- Salary: $46,610.37 year + per diem

Elections
- Voting system: Plurality voting
- Last election: November 5, 2024 (100 seats)
- Next election: November 3, 2026 (100 seats)
- Redistricting: Arkansas Board of Apportionment

Meeting place
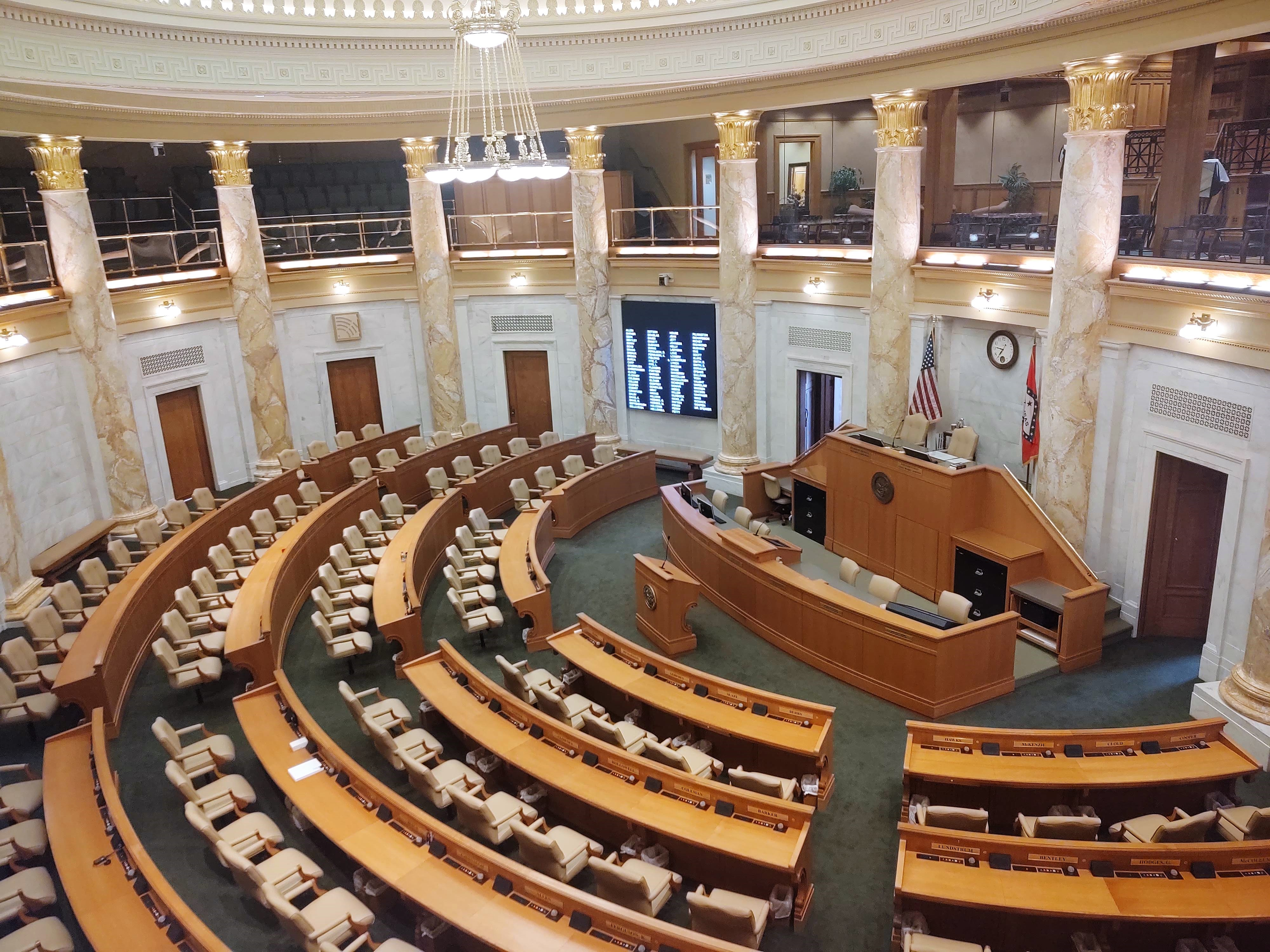
- House of Representatives Chamber; Arkansas State Capitol; Little Rock, Arkansas

Website
- Arkansas House of Representatives

The Arkansas House of Representatives is the lower house of the Arkansas General Assembly, the state legislature of the US state of Arkansas. The House has 100 members elected from an equal number of constituencies across the state. Each district has an average population of 30,137, according to the 2020 federal census. Members are elected to two-year terms and, since the 2014 Amendment to the Arkansas Constitution, limited to sixteen years cumulative in either house prior to a mandatory four-year respite before becoming eligible to run again. Effective in 2020, the limit was amended to twelve years consecutively (across both houses) before triggering the four year respite.

The Arkansas House of Representatives meets annually, in regular session in odd number years and for a fiscal session in even number years, at the State Capitol in Little Rock.

== History ==
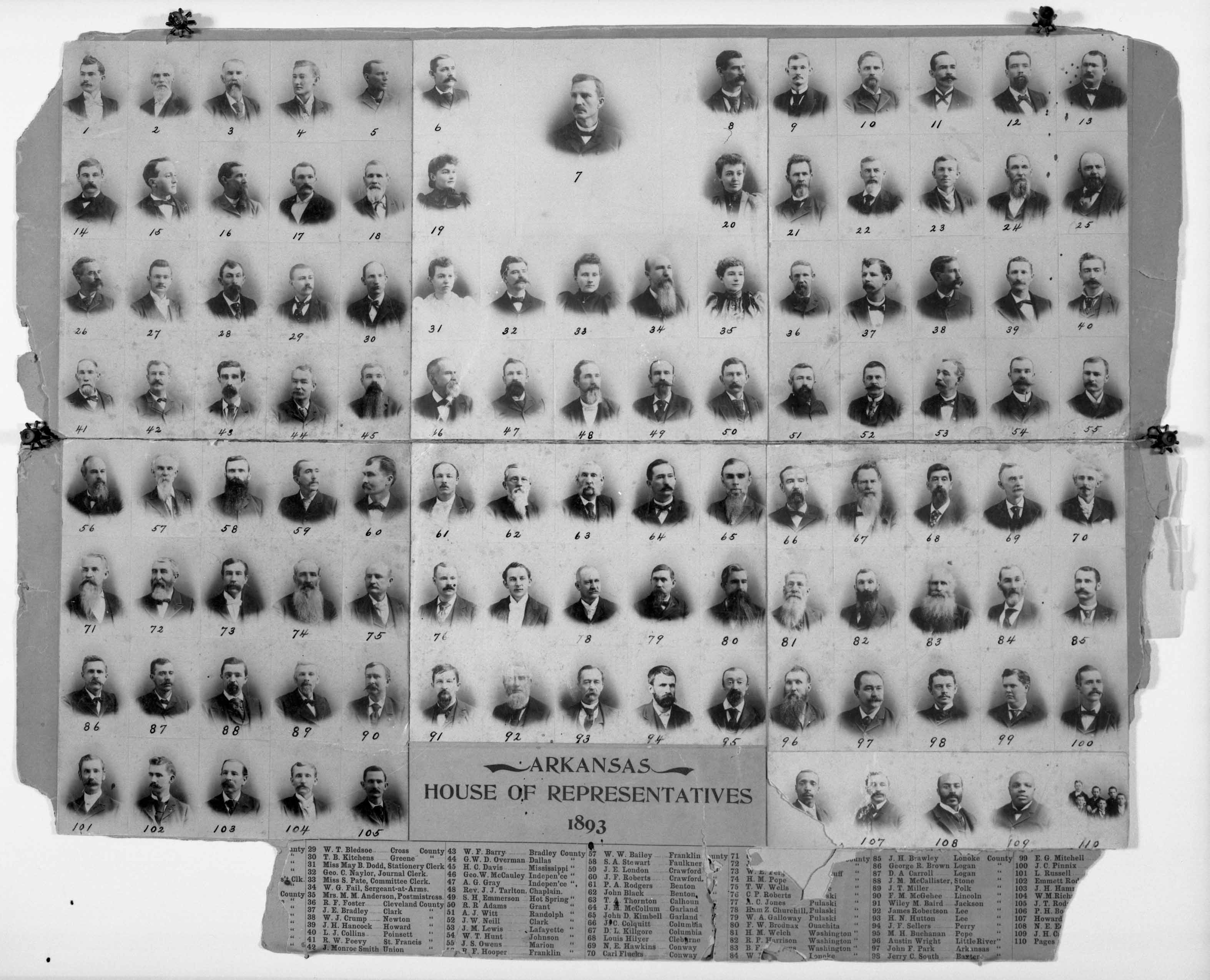
Arkansas House members in 1893, the four known African American members are segregated to the bottom right

During the Reconstruction era that followed the American Civil War, the Federal government passed the Reconstruction Acts and African Americans were enfranchised with voting rights. African Americans were elected and served in the Arkansas House although the numbers eventually declined as the Democrats retook control and were able to restore white supremacy. By the start of the 20th century African Americans were largely barred from holding in the Arkansas House and across the southern states.

John Wilson, the first Speaker of the Arkansas House of Representatives, stabbed Representative J. J. Anthony to death during a legislative debate on the floor of the chamber in 1837. Wilson was later acquitted. The Old State House is said to be haunted to this day.

In 1922, Frances Hunt became the first woman elected to a seat in the Arkansas General Assembly when she was elected to a seat in the Arkansas House of Representatives.

== Leadership of the House ==
The Speaker of the House presides over the body and is elected by the membership every two years. Its duties include the supervision and directing the daily order of business, recognizing members to speak, preserving order in the House, deciding all questions of order and germaneness, certifying all measures passed, assigning committee leadership, and naming members to select committees. In the Speaker's absence, the Speaker Pro Tempore presides.

=== Officers ===
Office	Officer	Party	District
Speaker of the Arkansas House of Representatives	Brian S. Evans	Republican	68
Speaker Pro Tempore	Vacant		
Assistant Speaker pro tempore, 1st District	Dwight Tosh	Republican	38
Assistant Speaker pro tempore, 2nd District	Fred Allen	Democratic	77
Assistant Speaker pro tempore, 3rd District	Kendra Moore	Republican	23
Assistant Speaker pro tempore, 4th District	Les Warren	Republican	84

=== Floor Leaders ===
Office	Officer	Party	District
Majority Leader	Howard M. Beaty Jr.	Republican	95
Majority Whip	Stetson Painter	Republican	3
Minority Leader	Andrew Collins	Democratic	73
Minority Whip	Denise Garner	Democratic	20

== Current composition ==
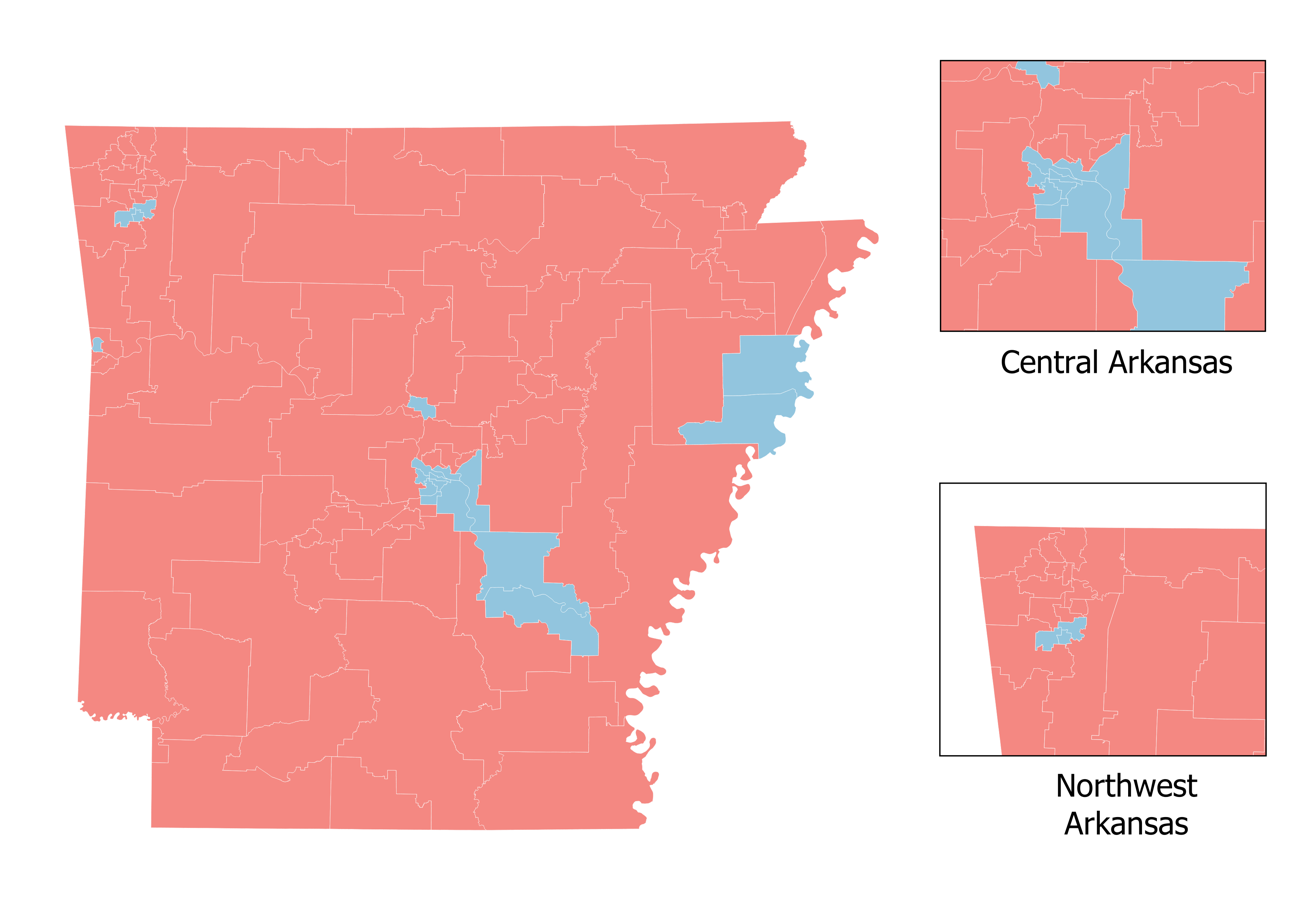

1	79	20
V	Republican	Democratic

Affiliation	Party (Shading indicates majority caucus)			Total	Vacant
Affiliation	Republican	Democratic	Independent	Total	Vacant
End of the 90th General Assembly	68	31	1	100	0
91st General Assembly (2019-2021)	76	24	0	100	0
92nd General Assembly (2021-2023)	78	22	0	100	0
93rd General Assembly (2023-2025)	82	18	0	100	0
Begin 94th (2025)	81	19	0	100	0
September 30, 2025 (Note: Republican Carlton Wing (District 70) resigned.)	80	19	0	99	1
March 3, 2026 (Note: Democrat Alex Holladay elected to succeed Wing (flip).)	80	20	0	100	0
March 24, 2026 (Note: Republican Stan Berry (District 44) died.)	79	20	0	99	1
August 4, 2026 (Note: Republican Bill Teeter elected to succeed Berry.)	80	20	0	100	0
August 5, 2026 (Note: Republican Austin McCollum (District 8) resigned after being arrested on a domestic violence charge.)	79	20	0	99	1
Latest voting share	79.8%	20.2%			

== Current membership ==
District	Name	Party	Residence	First elected	Term Limited
1	Jeremy Wooldridge	Rep	Marmaduke	2022	2034
2	Trey Steimel	Rep	Pocahontas	2022	2034
3	Stetson Painter	Rep	Mountain Home	2022	2034
4	Jason Nazarenko	Rep	Cotter	2024	2036
5	Ron McNair	Rep	Harrison	2014	2030
6	Harlan Breaux	Rep	Holiday Island	2018	2034
7	Brit McKenzie	Rep	Rogers	2022	2034
8	Vacant				
9	Diana Gonzales Worthen	Dem	Springdale	2024	2036
10	Mindy McAlindon	Rep	Centerton	2022	2034
11	Rebecca Burkes	Rep	Lowell	2022	2034
12	Hope Hendren Duke	Rep	Gravette	2022	2034
13	Scott Richardson	Rep	Bentonville	2022	2034
14	Nick Burkes	Rep	Bentonville	2024	2036
15	John P. Carr	Rep	Rogers	2020	2036
16	Kendon Underwood	Rep	Cave Springs	2020	2036
17	Randy Torres	Rep	Siloam Springs	2024	2036
18	Robin Lundstrum	Rep	Elm Springs	2014	2030
19	Steve Unger	Rep	Springdale	2022	2034
20	Denise Garner	Dem	Fayetteville	2018	2034
21	Nicole Clowney	Dem	Fayetteville	2018	2034
22	David Whitaker	Dem	Fayetteville	2012	2028
23	Kendra Moore	Rep	Lincoln	2022	2034
24	Brad Hall	Rep	Van Buren	2024	2036
25	Chad Puryear	Rep	Hindsville	2022	2034
26	James Eaton	Rep	Huntsville	2024	2036
27	Steven Walker	Rep	Horseshoe Bend	2022	2034
28	Bart Schulz	Rep	Cave City	2022	2034
29	Rick McClure	Rep	Malvern	2020	2036
30	Frances Cavenaugh	Rep	Walnut Ridge	2016	2032
31	Jimmy Gazaway	Rep	Paragould	2016	2032
32	Jack Ladyman	Rep	Jonesboro	2014	2030
33	Jon Milligan	Rep	Lake City	2020	2036
34	Joey L. Carr	Rep	Blytheville	2022	2034
35	Jessie McGruder	Dem	Marion	2024	2030
36	Johnny Rye	Rep	Trumann	2016	2032
37	Steve Hollowell	Rep	Forrest City	2016	2032
38	Dwight Tosh	Rep	Jonesboro	2014	2032
39	Wayne Long	Rep	Bradford	2022	2034
40	Shad Pearce	Rep	Batesville	2022	2034
41	Alyssa Brown	Rep	Heber Springs	2024	2036
42	Stephen Meeks	Rep	Greenbrier	2010	2026
43	Rick Beck	Rep	Center Ridge	2014	2030
44	Bill Teeter	Rep	Russellville	2026 (special)	2038
45	Aaron Pilkington	Rep	Knoxville	2016	2032
46	Jon S. Eubanks	Rep	Subiaco	2010	2026
47	Lee Johnson	Rep	Greenwood	2018	2034
48	Ryan Rose	Rep	Van Buren	2022	2034
49	Jay Richardson	Dem	Fort Smith	2018	2034
50	Zachary Gramlich	Rep	Fort Smith	2022	2034
51	Cindy Crawford	Rep	Fort Smith	2018	2034
52	Marcus Richmond	Rep	Harvey	2014	2030
53	Matt Duffield	Rep	Russellville	2022	2034
54	Mary Bentley	Rep	Perryville	2014	2030
55	Matthew Brown	Rep	Conway	2022	2034
56	Steve Magie	Dem	Conway	2012	2028
57	Cameron Cooper	Rep	Romance	2022	2034
58	Les Eaves	Rep	Searcy	2014	2030
59	Jim Wooten	Rep	Beebe	2018 (special)	2034
60	Roger Lynch	Rep	Lonoke	2016	2032
61	Jeremiah Moore	Rep	Clarendon	2022	2034
62	Mark McElroy	Rep	Tillar	2012	2030
63	Lincoln Barnett	Dem	Hughes	2024	2036
64	Ken Ferguson	Dem	Pine Bluff	2014	2030
65	Glenn Barnes	Dem	Pine Bluff	2024	2036
66	Mark Perry	Dem	Jacksonville	2008	2030
67	Karilyn Brown	Rep	Sherwood	2014	2030
68	Brian S. Evans	Rep	Cabot	2018	2034
69	David Ray	Rep	Maumelle	2020	2036
70	Alex Holladay	Dem	Little Rock	2026 (special)	2038
71	Brandon Achor	Rep	Maumelle	2022	2034
72	Tracy Steele	Dem	North Little Rock	2024	2036
73	Andrew Collins	Dem	Little Rock	2018	2034
74	Tippi McCullough	Dem	Little Rock	2018	2034
75	Ashley Hudson	Dem	Little Rock	2020	2036
76	Joy C. Springer	Dem	Little Rock	2020 (special)	2036
77	Fred Allen	Dem	Little Rock	2008	2026
78	Keith Brooks	Rep	Little Rock	2020	2036
79	Tara Shephard	Dem	Little Rock	2022	2034
80	Denise Ennett	Dem	Little Rock	2019 (special)	2036
81	R. J. Hawk	Rep	Bryant	2022	2034
82	Tony Furman	Rep	Benton	2020	2036
83	Paul Childress	Rep	Benton	2024	2036
84	Les Warren	Rep	Hot Springs	2016	2032
85	Richard McGrew	Rep	Hot Springs	2019 (special)	2036
86	John Maddox	Rep	Mena	2016	2032
87	DeAnn Vaught	Rep	Horatio	2014	2030
88	Dolly Henley	Rep	Washington	2024	2036
89	Justin Gonzales	Rep	Okolona	2014	2030
90	Richard Womack	Rep	Arkadelphia	2012	2028
91	Bruce Cozart	Rep	Hot Springs	2011 (special)	2028
92	Julie Mayberry	Rep	Hensley	2014	2032
93	Mike Holcomb	Rep	Pine Bluff	2012	2028
94	Jeff Wardlaw	Rep	Hermitage	2010	2026
95	Howard Beaty	Rep	Crossett	2020	2036
96	Sonia Eubanks Barker	Rep	Smackover	2016	2032
97	Matthew Shepherd	Rep	El Dorado	2010	2026
98	Wade Andrews	Rep	Camden	2022	2034
99	Lane Jean	Rep	Magnolia	2010	2026
100	Carol Dalby	Rep	Texarkana	2016	2032

== Committees ==
The House has 10 Standing Committees:

Class A:

- Education
- Judiciary
- Public Health, Welfare & Labor
- Public Transportation
- Revenue and Taxation

Class B:

- Aging, Children & Youth, Legislative & Military Affairs
- Agriculture, Forestry & Economic Development
- City, County and Local Affairs
- Insurance and Commerce
- State Agencies and Governmental Affairs

House select committees:

- Rules
- House Management

Joint committees:

- Budget
- Energy
- Performance Review
- Public Retirement and Social Security Programs
- Advanced Communication and Information Technology

Current committees include:

- Advanced Communications And Information Technology
- Aging, Children And Youth, Legislative & Military Affairs
  - Veterans' Home Task Force
  - House Leg., Military & Veterans Affairs
  - House Children & Youth Subcom.
  - House Aging Subcommittee
- Agriculture, Forestry & Economic Development
  - House Parks & Tourism Subcommittee
  - House Agriculture, Forestry & Natural Resources Subcom.
- City, County & Local Affairs Committee
  - House Planning Subcommittee
  - House Local Government Personnel Subcommittee
  - House Finance Subcommittee
- Education Committee
  - House K-12, Vocational-Technical Institutions Subcommittee
  - House Higher Education Subcommittee
  - House Early Childhood Subcommittee
- House Management
- House Rules
- Insurance & Commerce
  - House Utilities Subcommittee
  - House Insurance Subcommittee
  - House Financial Institutions Subcommittee
- Joint Performance Review
- Judiciary Committee
  - House Juvenile Justice & Child Support Subcommittee
  - House Courts & Civil Law Subcommittee
  - House Corrections & Criminal Law Subcommittee
- Public Health, Welfare And Labor Committee
  - House Labor & Environment Subcommittee
  - House Human Services Subcommittee
  - House Health Services Subcommittee
- Public Transportation
  - House Waterways & Aeronautics Subcom.
  - House And Rail Subcommittee
  - House Motor Vehicle & Highways Subcom.
- Revenue & Taxation
  - House Sales, Use, Misc. Taxes & Exemptions Subcom.
  - House Income Taxes-Personal & Corporate Subcom.
  - House Complaints And Remediation Subcom.
- State Agencies & Govt'L Affairs
  - House State Agencies & Reorgan. Subcom
  - House Elections Subcommittee
  - House Constitutional Issues Subcommittee

Each representative serves on two standing committees, and each committee has 20 members. Standing committee chairmen and vice-chairmen are selected from respective committee rosters by the speaker.

Two select committees operate exclusively within the House. Members of the committees are appointed by the speaker. The House select committees are the House Committee on Rules and the House Management Committee.

The Committee on Rules considers all proposed action touching the House rules, the joint rules and the order of business. The Committee also considers all legislation dealing with alcohol, cigarettes, tobacco, tobacco products, coin-operated amusement devices, vending machines, lobbying, code of ethics, pari-mutuel betting and similar legislation.

The House Management Committee works with the Speaker of the House to direct and oversee operations of the House of Representatives. Its duties include the hiring and supervision of the House Staff, the development of personnel policies and procedures, and the monitoring of facility usage and maintenance.

Representatives also serve on five committees that operate jointly with the Senate. They are Joint Budget, Joint Retirement and Social Security Programs, Joint Energy, Joint Performance Review and Joint Committee on Advanced, Communications and Information Technology

House members of the Joint Budget Committee are chosen by their peers from respective caucus districts. House members on other Joint Committees are appointed to their positions by the speaker.

== See also ==
- Arkansas General Assembly
- Arkansas Senate
- Arkansas State Capitol
- List of Arkansas General Assemblies
