= Carlton Wing =

American politician

Speaker pro tempore of the Arkansas House of Representatives
- In office January 13, 2025 – September 30, 2025
- Preceded by: Jon S. Eubanks
- Succeeded by: Vacant

Member of the Arkansas House of Representatives from the 70th district
- In office January 9, 2023 – September 30, 2025
- Preceded by: Spencer Hawks
- Succeeded by: Alex Holladay

Member of the Arkansas House of Representatives from the 38th district
- In office January 9, 2017 – January 9, 2023
- Preceded by: Donnie Copeland
- Succeeded by: Dwight Tosh

Personal details
- Party: Republican
- Spouse: Leigh
- Children: 4
- Education: Brigham Young University (BA); Harding University (MBA)

Carlton Wing is an American politician, businessman, and former sports broadcaster who served as a member of the Arkansas House of Representatives from the 38th district. Elected in November 2016, he resigned on September 30, 2025, to become executive director of Arkansas PBS.

== Education ==
Wing earned a Bachelor of Arts degree in broadcast communications from Brigham Young University and a Master of Business Administration from Harding University.

== Career ==
Wing began his career as a producer and sideline reporter for Blue and White Sports Network, now a part of BYU TV. In 1992 and 1993, he worked as a sales representative for Dentrix. Wing worked as the sports director of KJZZ-TV in Salt Lake City from 1993 to 1995, KREM in Spokane, Washington from 1995 to 1998, and KARK-TV in Little Rock, Arkansas from 1998 to 2001. From 2001 to 2009, Wing was the host of Fishing League Worldwide's annual tournament. In 2008, he founded Wing Media Group.

Wing was elected to the Arkansas House of Representatives in November 2016 and assumed office in January 2017. He also serves as chair of the House Management Committee. He was selected as speaker pro tempore for the 2025 legislative session.

On September 17, 2025, Arkansas PBS announced it had selected Wing to be the network's next executive director. He resigned from the House to take the position on September 30.

Arkansas House of Representatives
| Preceded by Jon S. Eubanks | Speaker pro tempore of the Arkansas House of Representatives; 2025 | Vacant |
