= Bill Teeter =

American politician

Member of the Arkansas House of Representatives from District 44
- Incumbent
- Assumed office August 17, 2026
- Preceded by: Stan Berry

Personal details
- Party: Republican
- Occupation: Public servant, emergency manager

William F. "Bill" Teeter is an American politician and retired public servant who a member of the Arkansas House of Representatives representing District 44. A member of the Republican Party, Teeter won a special election in August 2026 following the death of incumbent representative Stan Berry.

== Early life and career ==
Teeter is a long-time resident of Russellville, Arkansas. He spent decades working in local emergency services and public safety in the Arkansas River Valley. His career included service as an emergency services dispatcher, a volunteer firefighter, a search and rescue team leader, and a deputy coroner.

Most recently, Teeter worked for the Pope County Office of Emergency Management, serving as its Assistant Director and Public Information Officer (PIO) until his retirement in 2025.

== Political career ==
Following the death of incumbent Republican state representative Stan Berry in March 2026, a special election was called by Arkansas Governor Sarah Huckabee Sanders to fill the vacant seat in District 44, which spans parts of Pope and Van Buren counties. Teeter entered the four-way Republican primary for the seat as a first-time candidate.

On June 2, 2026, Teeter secured the top spot in the primary field with 31% of the vote, advancing to a scheduled special runoff election against runner-up Nikki Phillips. Shortly after the primary, Phillips withdrew from the contest to allow Teeter to win the party nomination seamlessly.

Teeter officially won the District 44 special general election unopposed on August 4, 2026, restoring the Republican supermajority in the Arkansas House of Representatives to an 80–20 margins. He is scheduled to run unopposed for a full two-year legislative term in the regular general election on November 3, 2026.
