= DiFronzo =

DiFronzo or DeFronzo may refer to:

== DiFronzo ==
- John DiFronzo (1928–2018), nicknamed "No Nose", American mobster and the reputed former boss of the Chicago Outfit
- Peter DiFronzo (1933-2020), brother of John DiFronzo (reputed to be the leader of the Chicago Outfit) and Joseph DiFronzo

== DeFronzo ==
- David DeFronzo, American politician
- Donald DeFronzo, American politician
