= American Normal School Association =

American Normal School Association was an organization in the United States that promoted professional improvement of normal schools (teacher training institutions) and held an annual convention. Established in 1855, it hosted convention meetings, lectures, essays, and discussion. William F. Phelps served as its president. In 1870 it merged with the National Teachers' Association and the National Association of School Superintendents to form the National Education Association (NEA).

Its first annual meeting was held in Trenton, New Jersey in August 1859 and its second in Buffalo, New York. George Norman Bigelow, J. W. Buckley, J. W. Dickinson, David Nelson Camp professor at the New Britain Normal School in Connecticut, and Richard Edwards were early advocates for it. A journal of its proceedings and addresses at the 1871 meeting in Cleveland was published. Delia Asenath Lathrop later known as Delia Lathrop Williams, principal of the Cincinnati Normal School, was one of the presenters in Cleveland. Alpheus Crosby was also involved with it.

== See also ==
- Normal schools in the United States
- American Association of Colleges for Teacher Education
