= Donald DeFronzo =

American politician

Donald J. DeFronzo

Member of the Connecticut State Senate from the 6th district
- In office 2003–2011
- Preceded by: Thomas Bozek
- Succeeded by: Theresa Gerratana

Mayor of New Britain, Connecticut
- In office 1989–1993
- Preceded by: William J. McNamara
- Succeeded by: Linda A. Blogoslawski Mlynarczyk

Personal details
- Born: 1948 (age 77–78)
- Party: Democratic
- Spouse: Diane DeFronzo
- Children: David DeFronzo

Donald J. DeFronzo is an American politician. He was a Democratic state senator from Connecticut from 2003 until 2011 when he was appointed Department of Administrative Services commissioner by Governor Dan Malloy.

A resident of New Britain, DeFronzo represented Berlin, Farmington, and New Britain in the Connecticut Senate. Prior to being elected to the Senate, he served as mayor of New Britain from 1989 to 1993.

He holds degrees from Fairfield University and the University of Connecticut. He served as Governor William A. O'Neill Endowed Chair in Public Policy and Practical Politics at Central Connecticut State University.

On August 24, 2017, Governor Dan Malloy named DeFronzo chair of the Connecticut Lottery. He retired from the Connecticut Lottery on November 15, 2019.

His son, David DeFronzo, is currently the State Representative for the Connecticut's 26th House of Representatives district.

== See also ==
- Connecticut Senate

Preceded by Thomas Bozek	Connecticut Senator from the Sixth District; 2003–2010	Succeeded by Theresa Gerratana
