= John Geragosian =

American politician (born 1962)

Member of the Connecticut House of Representatives from the 25th district
- In office January 4, 1995 – January 5, 2011
- Preceded by: Raymond M.H. Joyce
- Succeeded by: Bobby Sanchez

Personal details
- Born: January 29, 1962 (age 64) New Britain, Connecticut, U.S.
- Party: Democratic

John Geragosian (born January 29, 1962) is an American politician who served in the Connecticut House of Representatives from the 25th district from 1995 to 2011.
