= Plymouth Plantation =

Plymouth Plantation may refer to:

- Of Plymouth Plantation, a book by William Bradford
- Plimoth Patuxet, a living museum in Plymouth, Massachusetts, formerly known as Plimoth Plantation
- Plymouth Colony (sometimes New Plymouth), the English colonial venture in North America from 1620 to 1691
