= SSAC =

SSAC may refer to:

- Massachusetts State Student Advisory Council
- MIT Sloan Sports Analytics Conference
- Safiuddin Sarker Academy and College
- Scottish Science Advisory Council
- Security and Stability Advisory Committee, a body that advises ICANN on strategic threats to the Internet
- Social Security Advisory Committee, an advisory body to the United Kingdom government on social security issues
- Society for the Study of Architecture in Canada, an architectural history organization in Canada, established in 1974
- Southern States Athletic Conference, a NAIA athletic conference in the United States
- West Virginia Secondary School Activities Commission
