= State Library of Massachusetts =

Library in the Massachusetts State House

Coordinates: 42.35807°N 71.06365°W

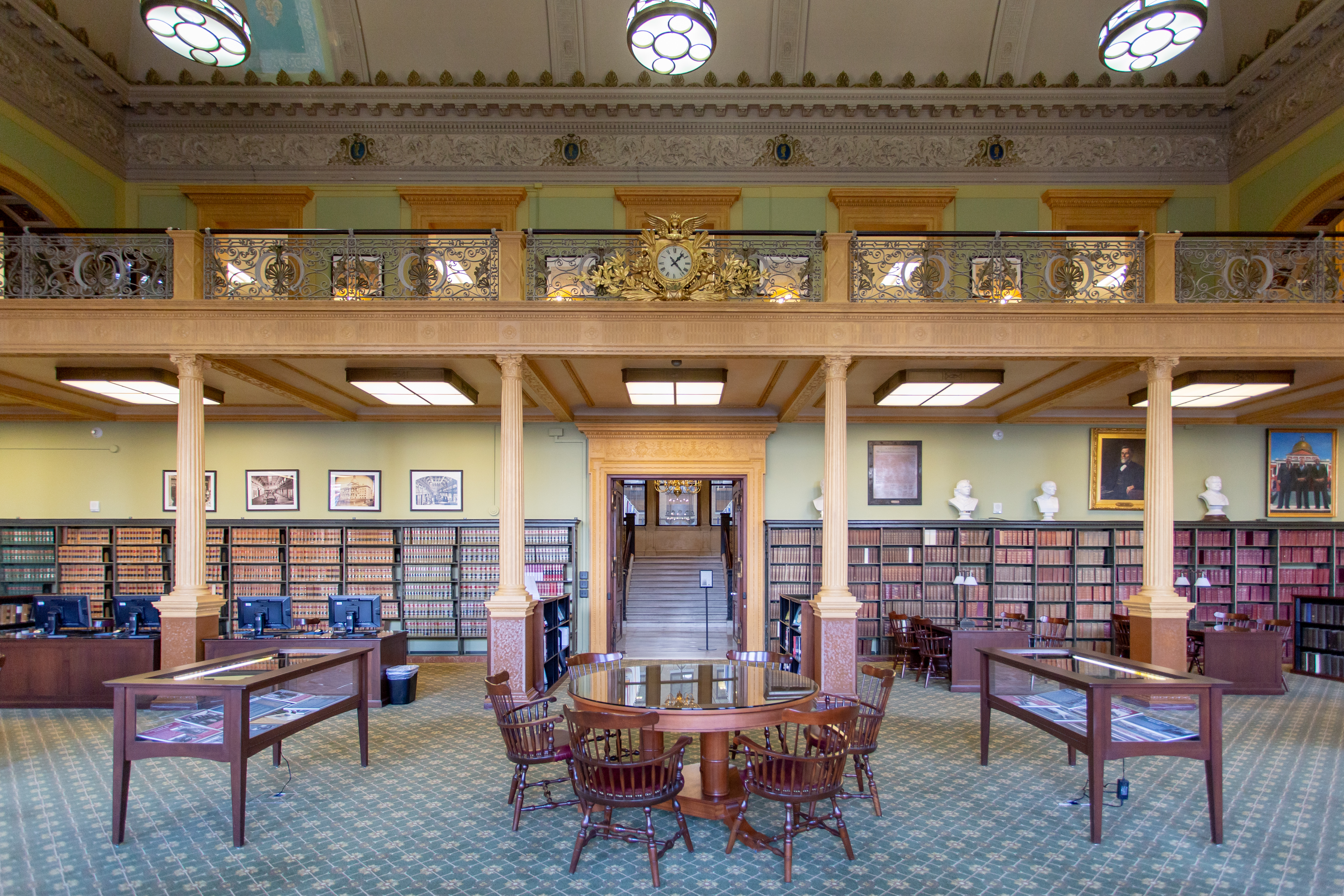
- The library reading room
- Location: Boston, MA
- Established: 1826

Collection
- Size: 500,000 print; over 125,000 electronic documents

Other information
- Director: Stacy DeBole, State Librarian
- Affiliation: Boston Library Consortium
- Website: www.mass.gov/lib

The State Library of Massachusetts in Boston, Massachusetts was established in 1826 and "supports the research and information needs of government, libraries, and people through ... services and access to a comprehensive repository of state documents and other historical items." It "opened in 1826 and has been in its present location in the State House since the 1890s." The State Library falls under the administration of the governor.

== History ==
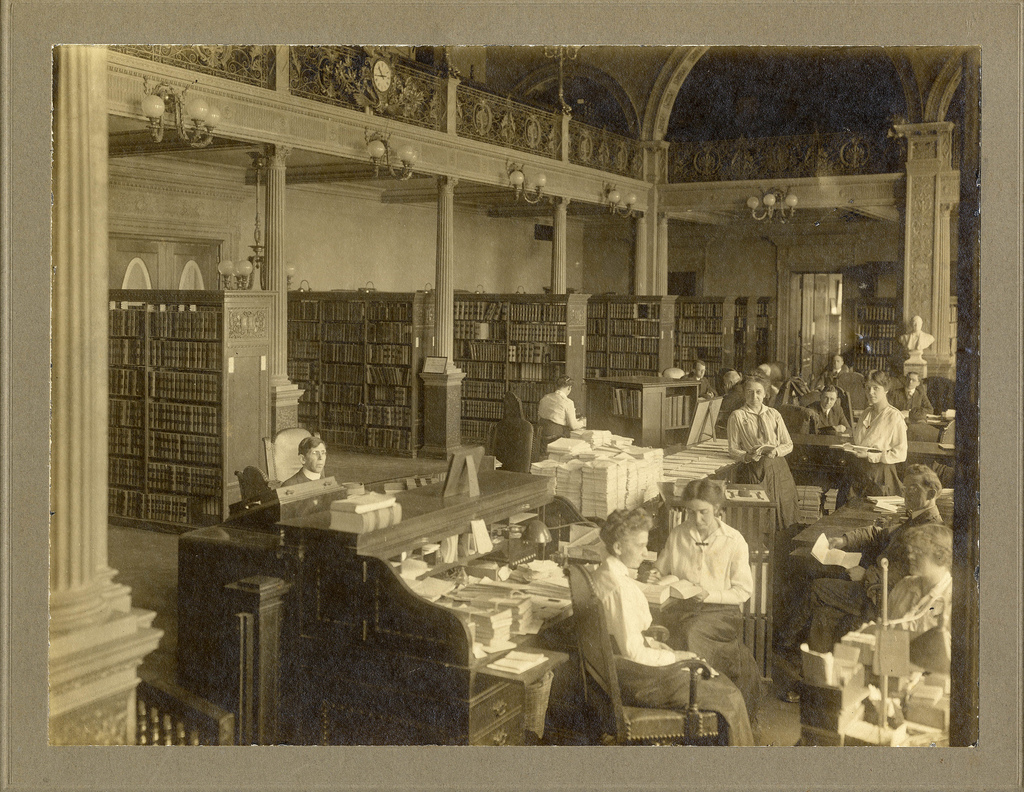
The reading room of the State Library of Massachusetts in 1912

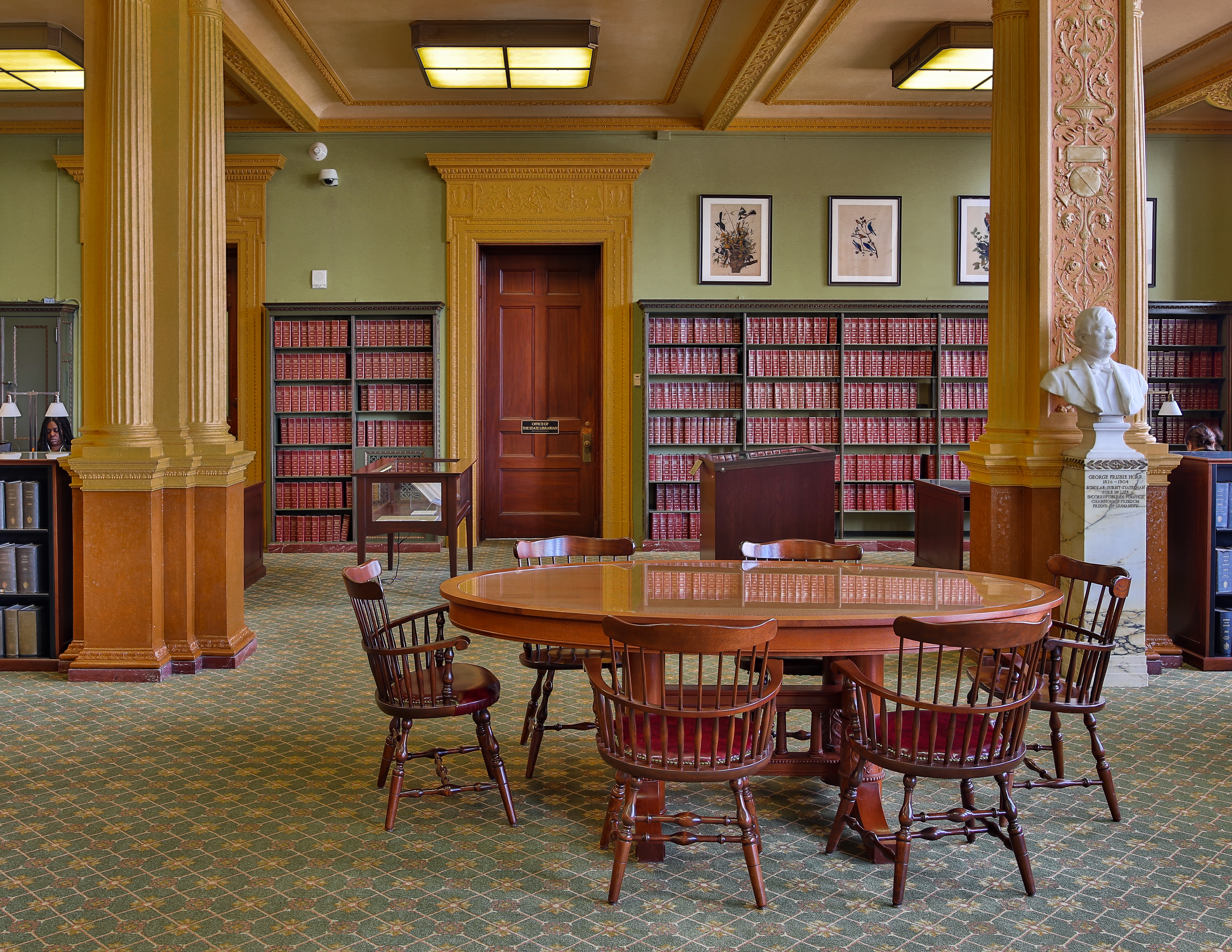
A seating area in the reading room

The State Library’s origins date back to 1811 with the establishment of a program to exchange statutes with other states. The Library was formally established by the General Court in 1826 to hold these documents and other materials that had accumulated in offices throughout the State House. State Land Agent George W. Coffin was given the additional responsibilities of State Librarian, and the Library’s collection was housed in the Land Agent’s office. The exchange program was expanded in 1844 to include judicial decisions and other significant state documents, and the documents acquired through this program formed the core of the early collections of the State Library and is one of the largest collections of state publications in existence.

During the mid-19th century, the Library evolved into a comprehensive research library to support the work of the legislature, governor’s office, and other public officials. In addition to legal and public document holdings, the Library collected materials on a wide range of research topics, including political, historical, statistical, economic and scientific works. By this time, the Library’s collection had outgrown its original space and was moved to a larger, dedicated library space when a State House addition was completed in 1856. Also during this time, the Library came under the direction of the Secretary of the Board of Education in 1849.

Throughout the later part of the 19th century and early 20th century, the Library’s collections and operations continued to grow. In 1893, the Library became its own department directly under the Governor. The Library moved to its current location in 1895 and added an annex for additional stack space in the 1920s. This annex would become the Library’s Special Collections Department in the 1970s, where rare and special items such as maps, photographs, atlases, and manuscript materials are now located. These include treasures such as the Bradford Manuscript and the medal presented to Senator Charles Sumner by the Haitian government.

In 2007, the library created an online repository of state documents and in 2009, the library received funding to enhance its digital library. In 2012, the library completed converting their old card catalog to their online public access catalog and books were reclassified from Dewey Decimal to Library of Congress call numbers.

In recent decades, the Library’s collecting focus has narrowed, with an emphasis now on disseminating information more quickly and easily. Although the Library still has an extensive historic collection of government documents from throughout the country and an older general research collection, the Library now focuses on collecting material specifically about Massachusetts, particularly state and municipal publications and histories. In the past decade, much of the Library’s efforts have been centered on providing electronic access to these materials by both capturing contemporary state publications and digitizing older Massachusetts-related materials.

=== Trustees ===
In 2019, the library's trustees are:

- Karen Spilka, ex officio President of the Senate (designee: Senator James B. Eldridge)
- Robert A. DeLeo, ex officio Speaker of the House (designee: Representative Kate Hogan)
- William Francis Galvin, ex officio Secretary of State (designee: John Roseberry)
- Michele Capone (appointed by the governor)
- Robert A. Cerasoli (appointed by the governor)
- Teresa Koster (appointed by the governor)

=== State Librarians ===
After the establishment of the State Library in 1826, the following individuals have acted as State Librarian of Massachusetts:

1826–1849	George W. Coffin (in his role as State Land Agent)	
1849–1855	Barnas Sears (in his role as Secretary of the Board of Education)	
1855–1861	George S. Boutwell, ex officio (in his role as Secretary of the Board of Education)	Samuel C. Jackson, Acting Librarian (1858–1861)
1861–1877	Joseph White, ex officio (in his role as Secretary of the Board of Education)	Samuel C. Jackson, Acting Librarian
1877–1893	John W. Dickinson, ex officio (in his role as Secretary of the Board of Education)	Oliver Warner, Acting Librarian (1877–1879); Caleb B. Tillinghast, Acting Librarian (1879–1893)
1893–1909	Caleb Benjamin Tillinghast	
1909–1917	Charles F. D. Belden	
1917	Foster W. Stearns	Mrs. Annie Hopkins, Acting Librarian (Sept 15 to Dec 1, 1917)
1917–1919	Lawrence Evans	
1919–1936	Edward Redstone	
1936–1959	Dennis Dooley	
1960–1972	I. Albert Matkov	
1973–1980	A. Hunter Rineer, Jr.	
1980–1982	James H. Fish	
1982–1997	Gasper Caso	
1997–2007	Stephen A. Fulchino	
2007–2022	Elvernoy H. Johnson	
2022–present	Stacy R. DeBole	

== Collections ==
=== Digital Collections ===
Many library collections are available digitally through the library's website. These items include both older digitized material and more recent electronically borne state documents. Resources include the Massachusetts Acts and Resolves (1692 to present), annual reports of various state agencies and Special Collections materials, such as the IMLS funded project Mapping Massachusetts: The History of Transportation Systems in the Commonwealth. These documents are archived in the Library's digital repository.

=== Print Collections ===
The library holds collections in the areas of government documents, law, Massachusetts history, and public and current affairs. "As the legally designated depository library for Massachusetts state publications, the State Library has the most complete collection of Massachusetts government documents in existence." The library maintains a comprehensive collection of Massachusetts legislative documents and House and Senate Journals, which are the primary sources for doing Massachusetts legislative history research. The Periodicals holdings includes dozens of daily and weekly newspapers from various towns and cities in Massachusetts that are available in print and on microfiche.

=== Special Collections ===
The Special Collections department houses the library’s oldest and rarest materials, as well as the copy of record for Massachusetts legislative records. Holdings comprise rare books, manuscripts, broadsides, newspapers, tax valuations, architectural drawings, prints and photographs, scrapbooks, souvenirs and archival collections from former Massachusetts legislators. The collection is particularly strong in nineteenth and twentieth-century city directories, maps, and atlases for towns across Massachusetts.

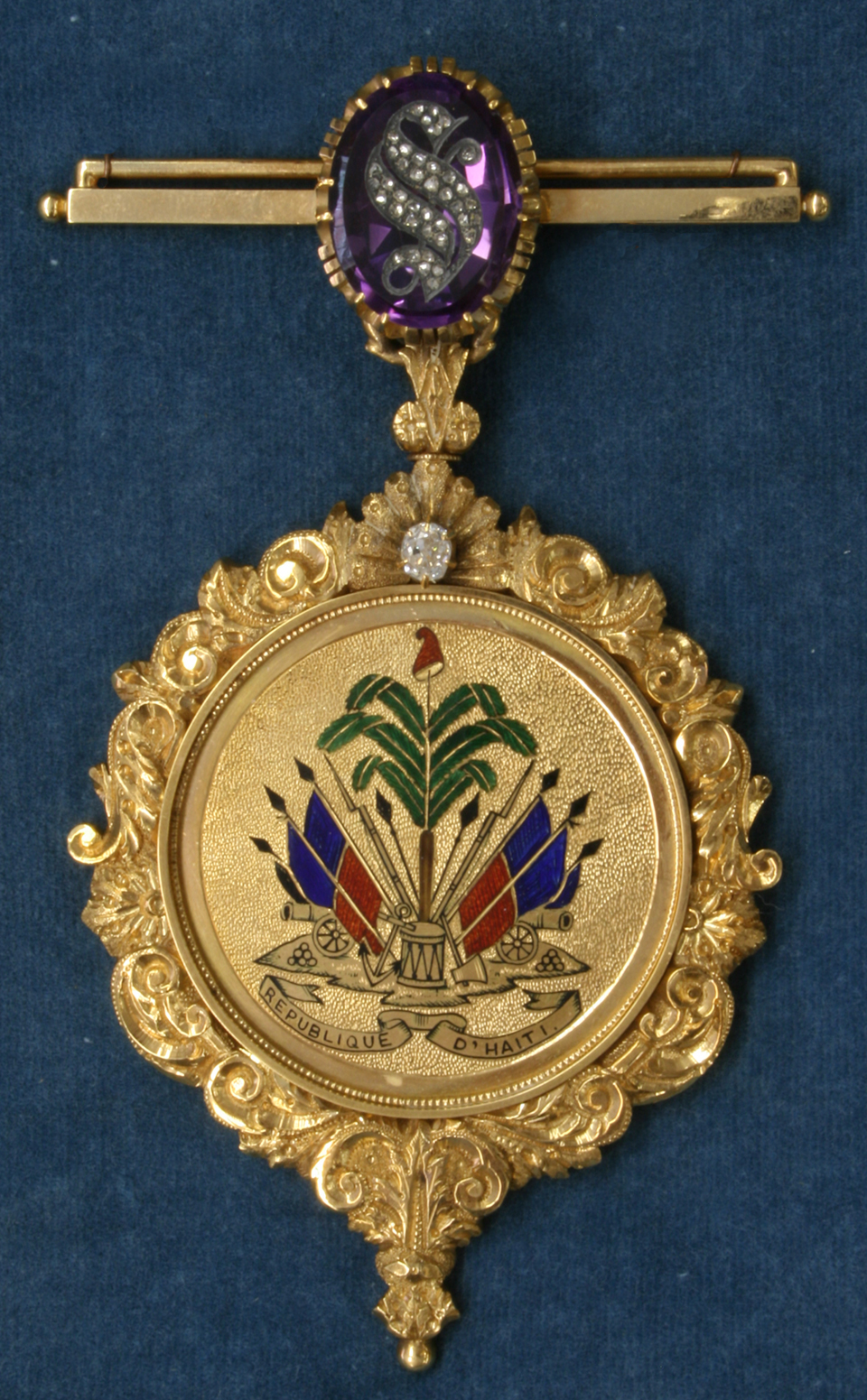
The medal presented to Charles Sumner by President Nissage Saget of Haiti in honor of Sumner's work to gain U.S. recognition of Haiti as a sovereign state. Donated to the State Library of Massachusetts by Charles Sumner.

=== Exhibitions ===
The library curates several exhibits each year that feature items from the library collections. Past library exhibits have included:

- The 55th Regiment and the Alfred S. Hartwell Collection, Spring 2008.
- "Mary Vaux Walcott's North American Wild Flowers," Summer 2008.
- "Plymouth, Massachusetts: People, Politics and Primary Resources," Fall 2008.
- "African Americans in the Massachusetts Legislature: A History," Winter 2009.
- "Holyoke: Queen of Industrial Cities," Fall 2009.
- Massachusetts Women in Politics, Winter 2010.
- Butterflies of North America and Britain, Summer 2010.
- "Decorated Publishers' Bindings 1840 to 1930," Summer 2011.
- "Worcester: Heart of the Commonwealth," Winter 2011.
- "Amazing Birds: The Wild Side of Massachusetts," Summer 2012.
- "Capital Blooms, Art & Artifacts: Floral interpretations from the State Library Collection," Summer 2012.
- "The Time of Action Has Come: Bringing Pure Water into the City of Boston," Fall 2012.
- "It Was Everyone's War: Celebrating the Contributions of Massachusetts to Abolition and the Civil War," Spring 2013.
- "Moving Massachusetts: The History of Transportation in the Commonwealth," Summer 2013.
- "The Beginnings of the Textile Industry in Massachusetts," Fall 2013.
- "Courage in the Commonwealth: Massachusetts in World War I," Spring 2014.
- "Exploring the World Through Natural History," Summer 2014.
- "Legends and Lore of Massachusetts," Fall 2014.
- "Cultivating the Commonwealth: A History of Agriculture in Massachusetts," Summer 2015.
- "Massachusetts Through The Lens: Photograph Collections at the State Library of Massachusetts," Fall 2015.
- "A Historical View of the Massachusetts State House," Spring 2016.
- "Exercised in Fishing: A History of the Fishing, Whaling, and Shellfish Industries in Massachusetts," Summer 2016.
- "Back To School: A Retrospective View Of Education in Massachusetts," Fall 2016.
- "From Williamstown to Wellfleet Wandering through the Commonwealth," Spring 2017.
- "Rest, Relaxation, and Recreation Parks in Massachusetts," Summer 2017.
- "Symbols of Massachusetts," Fall 2017.
- "Massachusetts Architectural Styles," Spring 2018.
- "Massachusetts Firsts," Summer 2018.
- "Bird's-Eye View Maps in the State Library of Massachusetts," Fall 2018.
- "From Common to Uncommon Advertisements in Massachusetts City Directories," Spring 2019.
- "The Natural Beauty of Massachusetts Waterways," Summer 2019.
- "One Hundred Years Ago: Massachusetts in 1919," Fall 2019.
- "The State Library of Massachusetts Serving the Commonwealth since 1826," Spring 2020.

Select images from these exhibits can be viewed on the library's Flickr page.

== See also ==
- Massachusetts State House, site of the library
- State Library, general article about state libraries
- List of libraries in the United States
