= David Nelson Camp =

American educator (1820–1916)

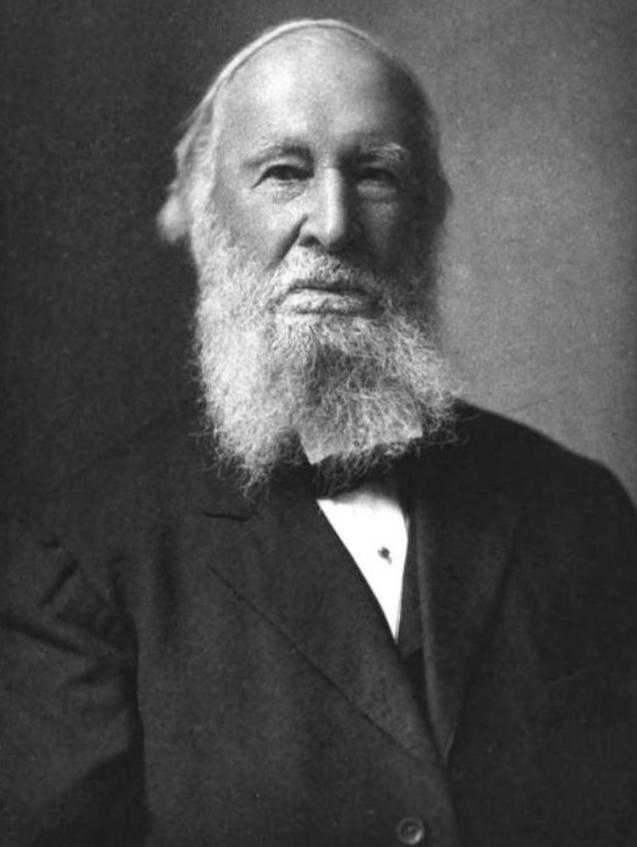

David Nelson Camp (October 3, 1820 – October 19, 1916) was an American educator, historian, author, and mayor in Connecticut. He served as Mayor of New Britain, Connecticut and in the state legislature.

Camp was born in Durham, Connecticut. Elah Camp and Orit (Lee) Camp were his parents. He married Sarah Adaline Howd on June 25, 1844. He was mayor of New Britain from 1877 to 1879. He was a Republican.

Camp wrote History of New Britain, with sketches of Farmington and Berlin, Connecticut. 1640–1889 published by W. B. Thomson & Company published in 1889 and David Nelson Camp, recollections of a long and active life published in New Britain, Connecticut in 1917.

Camp home at 9 Camp Street is in the Walnut Hill District. He was an early leader of the American Normal School Association. He is buried at Fairview Cemetery in New Britain.

== See also ==
- Walter Camp

== External libks ==
- David Belson Camp Findagrave entry
- Media related to David Nelson Camp at Wikimedia Commons
