= Connecticut's 25th House of Representatives district =

American legislative district

Connecticut's 25th State House of Representatives district
Representative
Iris Sanchez; D

Connecticut's 25th House of Representatives district elects one member of the Connecticut House of Representatives. It encompasses parts of the city of New Britain. It is currently held by Democrat Iris Sanchez, who won the seat in a special election after Bobby Sanchez was elected mayor of New Britain, Connecticut.

== List of representatives ==
List of Representatives from Connecticut's 25th House of Representatives District
Representative	Party	Years	District home	Note
Philip D. Doran	Democratic	1967–1969	Berlin	Seat created
Robert A. Argazzi	Republican	1969–1973	Kensington	
Julius D. Morris	Democratic	1973–1979	New Britain	
Raymond M. H. Joyce	Democratic	1979–1995	New Britain	
John Geragosian	Democratic	1995–2013	New Britain	
Bobby Sanchez	Democratic	2013–2025	New Britain	Elected mayor of New Britain, Connecticut
Iris Sanchez	Democratic	2026–	New Britain	Elected in a special election

== Recent elections ==
=== 2020 ===
2020 Connecticut State House of Representatives election, District 25
Party	Candidate	Votes	%
Democratic	Robert Sanchez (incumbent)	3,921	69.24
Republican	Jerrell Hargraves	1,503	26.54
Working Families	Robert Sanchez (incumbent)	239	4.22
Total votes		5,663	100.00
Democratic hold			

=== 2018 ===
2018 Connecticut House of Representatives election, District 25
Party	Candidate	Votes	%
Democratic	Bobby Sanchez	3,291	97.7
Independent Party	Alfred Mayo	76	2.3
Total votes		3,367	100.00
Democratic hold			

=== 2016 ===
2016 Connecticut State Senate election, District 25
Party	Candidate	Votes	%
Democratic	Bobby Sanchez (incumbent)	4,349	80.96
Republican	Richard Gadomski	897	16.70
Green	Martha Kelly	126	2.35
Total votes		5,372	100.00
Democratic hold			

=== 2014 ===
2014 Connecticut State Senate election, District 25
Party	Candidate	Votes	%
Democratic	Bobby Sanchez (incumbent)	2,050	67.3
Republican	Edward Colon	697	22.9
Independent Party	Alfred Mayo	97	3.2
Working Families	Bobby Sanchez	148	4.9
Green	Paul Gobell	55	1.8
Total votes		3,047	100.00
Democratic hold			

=== 2012 ===
2016 Connecticut State Senate election, District 25
Party	Candidate	Votes	%
Democratic	Bobby Sanchez (incumbent)	3,986	83.3
Republican	Richard Gadomski	743	15.5
Green	Martha Kelly	55	1.1
Total votes		4,784	100.00
Democratic hold			
