= Gennaro Bizzarro =

American politician (born 1976)

Member of the Connecticut State Senate from the 6th district
- In office March 4, 2019 – January 6, 2021
- Preceded by: Theresa Gerratana
- Succeeded by: Rick Lopes

Personal details
- Born: 1975 or 1976 (age 50–51)
- Party: Republican
- Spouse: Kara
- Children: 3
- Education: Fordham University (BA); Quinnipiac University School of Law (JD)
- Profession: Attorney
- Website: www.gbforsenate.com

Gennaro Bizzarro (born 1976) is an American attorney and Republican politician from the state of Connecticut, and a former member of the Connecticut State Senate for the sixth district. He graduated from Fordham University with a Bachelor of Arts in 1997, and he attended Quinnipiac University School of Law, where he was editor in chief for the Quinnipiac Law Review. He graduated magna cum laude from Quinnipiac in 2000, then went into private practice and opened his own law firm.

Bizzarro served as chairman of the city finance board of New Britain, Connecticut. He was appointed corporation counsel by New Britain's Mayor Tim Stewart in 2006. He became president of the chamber of commerce and also served as corporation counsel for Erin Stewart during her mayoralty. He ran for the Connecticut House of Representatives in the 24th district in 2014 but lost to incumbent Democrat Rick Lopes.

Theresa Gerratana resigned from the Connecticut State Senate to accept a position in Governor Ned Lamont's administration. Bizzarro ran in a special election to fill her unexpired term on February 26, 2019 and this time defeated Lopes. He was sworn into office on March 4, 2019 as the senator for the sixth district, which includes New Britain, Berlin, and part of Farmington. Bizzarro ran for a full term in the 2020 election, but was defeated by Lopes.

Bizzarro is from New Britain. He is married and has three daughters. His parents immigrated to the United States from Italy.
