= William F. Phelps =

William Franklin Phelps
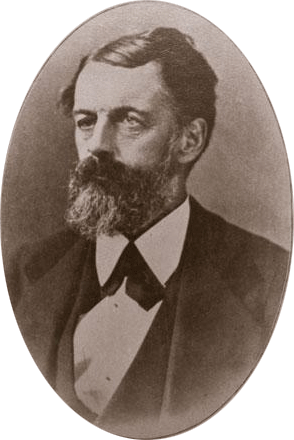

2nd Principal of Winona Normal School
- In office September 22, 1864 – December 6, 1876
- Preceded by: John G. McMynn
- Succeeded by: Charles A. Morey

Personal details
- Born: February 15, 1822 Auburn, New York
- Died: August 15, 1907 (aged 85) St. Paul, Minnesota
- Occupation: Educator; author
- Known for: Founder and president of the National Education Association

William Franklin Phelps (February 15, 1822 – August 15, 1907) was an educational pioneer and author of textbooks and training manuals for preparing individuals pursuing a career in education. He served as the president of several normal schools and educational associations along the eastern seaboard. Most notably, he served as the founder and president of the National Education Association (NEA), and president of the American Normal School Association from 1856 to 1900 (44 years). He also served as the vice-president of the first International Conference of Educators, over which he presided at the centennial exposition in 1876.

== Personal life ==
Phelps was born in Auburn, New York, the son of Halsey and Lucinda (née Hitchcock) Phelps. He was descended from the puritan colonist, William Phelps. He studied at Auburn Academy and Auburn High School. In 1844, Phelps was appointed as a promising student from Cayuga County, New York to attend the New York State Normal School. This opportunity required a transfer to Albany. Phelps graduated with honors in 1846 from the first class of the Normal School in Albany and went on to teach at its Model School.

In 1852, Phelps was awarded an A.M. (artium magister) degree, also known as a master's degree from Union College in Schenectady, New York. He married Carolyn Chapman, daughter of William Chapman of Albany, New York, and widow of Crawford Livingston. They had one daughter, Alice Livingston Phelps.

== Professional background ==
In 1855, he was elected first principal of the New Jersey State Normal School at Trenton. A normal school was a school created to train high school graduates to be teachers. The following year he also became responsible for the Farnum Preparatory School in Beverly, New Jersey. He maintained responsibility for both offices until 1864. During this time he concurrently held the positions of president of the American Normal School Association from 1856 until 1860, as well as president of the National Educational Convention.

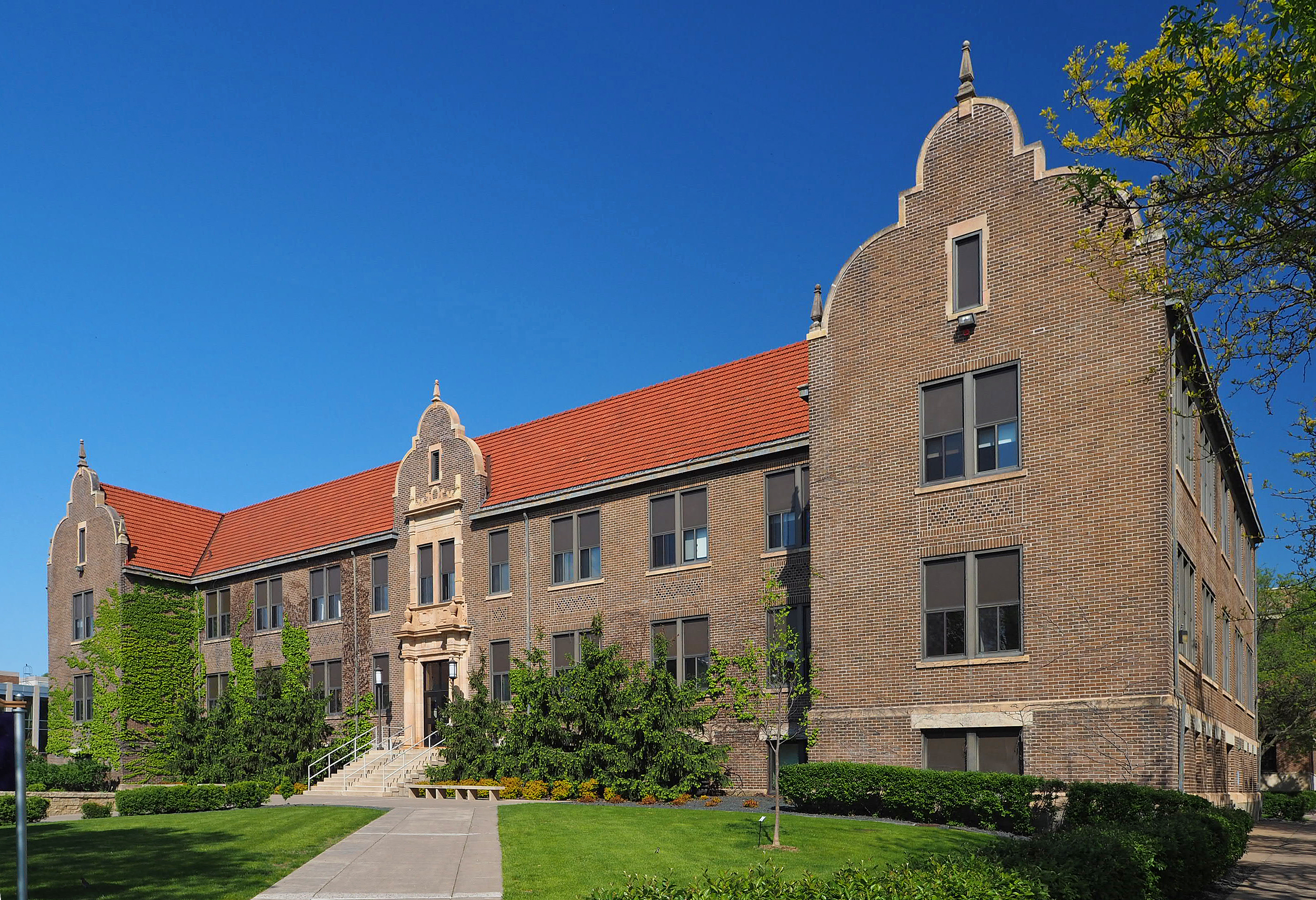
Phelps Hall on the main campus of the Minnesota State Normal School, now known as Winona State University

In 1864, Phelps became the president of the first Minnesota State Normal School in Winona. He served in this role for 12 years. During this same time period, he was also the editor-in-chief of the Chicago Educational Weekly from 1867 to 1868.

In 1875, Phelps published two volumes of reports on the New Jersey and Minnesota normal schools, The Teachers' Handbook (1875, which was translated into Spanish for the use of the Argentine Republic). The following year he moved to Wisconsin, where he served as the vice-president of the first International Conference of Educators. He also became the president of the Wisconsin State Normal School for two years.

Additional published works by Phelps include five brochures for the Chautauqua Literary and Scientific Circle (CLSC), founded in 1878 by Bishop Vincent. Donated works include "What is Education?" "Socrates", "Horace Mann", "Pestalozzi and Froebel", and "John Sturm". Phelps also offered several reports of the New Jersey and Minnesota normal schools. In 1878, Phelps received a silver medal from the Paris exposition as an educational collaborator and author.

In 1879 he returned to Minnesota, where he was Superintendent of Public Schools from 1879 to 1881 and again from 1883 to 1885. He also served as the secretary of the Winona Board of Trade from 1878 to 1885, secretary of the St. Paul Chamber of Commerce from 1886 to 1887, and secretary of the Duluth Chamber of Commerce from 1887 to 1890.

Phelps was president of the American Normal School Association from 1856 to 1900, president of the National Educational Association from 1875 to 1876, and vice-president of the first International Conference of Educators, over which he presided at the centennial exposition in 1876. At the Paris exposition of 1878, he was awarded an honorary diploma in recognition of his work, along with a silver medal as an educational collaborator and author.
