= Irene Favreau =

American politician

Member of the Connecticut House of Representatives from the 24th district
- In office 1983–1989
- Preceded by: Joseph H. Harper Jr.
- Succeeded by: David Pudlin

Personal details
- Born: 1949 or 1950
- Party: Democratic
- Education: Central Connecticut State University

Irene Favreau (born 1949 or 1950) is an American politician who served in the Connecticut House of Representatives from 1983 to 1989, representing the 24th district as a Democrat. She studied political science at Central Connecticut State University and has worked as a legal secretary. Favreau lived in New Britain during her tenure.
