= Peter Tercyak =

American politician

Member of the Connecticut House of Representatives from the 26th district
- In office August 17, 2003 – January 8, 2025
- Preceded by: Anthony Tercyak
- Succeeded by: David DeFronzo

Personal details
- Born: December 27, 1954 (age 71) Waterville, Maine, U.S.
- Party: Democratic
- Education: Capital Community College (ADN); University of Connecticut (BA)

Peter Tercyak (born December 27, 1954) is an American politician who served in the Connecticut House of Representatives from the 26th district from 2003 to 2025.
