= Massachusetts Board of Education =

State education agency of Massachusetts

The Massachusetts Board of Elementary and Secondary Education (BESE) is the state education agency responsible for interpreting and implementing laws relevant to public education in the Commonwealth of Massachusetts. Public education in the Commonwealth is organized according to the regulations adopted by the BESE, which are good faith interpretations of Massachusetts state and federal law. The BESE's responsibilities include granting and renewing charter school applications, developing and implementing the Massachusetts Comprehensive Assessment System (MCAS), submitting yearly budget proposals for public education to the Massachusetts General Court, setting the standards for and certifying teachers, principals, and superintendents, and monitoring—as well as intervening to ameliorate—the achievement of underperforming districts in the Commonwealth.

== History ==
The board was established in 1837 and is the second oldest state board of education in the United States. Governor Edward Everett had recommended the establishment of a board of education in his address to the 1837 legislature's opening session. His brief argument ran as follows:

While nothing can be further from my purpose, than to disparage the common schools as they are, and while a deep sense of personal obligation to them will ever be cherished by me, it must yet be candidly admitted that they are susceptible of great improvements. The school houses might, in many cases, be rendered more commodious. Provision ought to be made for affording the advantages of education, throughout the whole year, to all of a proper age to receive it. Teachers well qualified to give elementary instruction in all the branches of useful knowledge, should be employed; and small school libraries, maps, globes, and requisite scientific apparatus should be furnished. I submit to the Legislature, whether the creation of a board of commissioners of schools, to serve without salary, with authority to appoint a secretary, on a reasonable compensation, to be paid from the school fund, would not be of great utility.

The legislature's Committee on Education, led by Senate chairman Josiah Quincy Jr. and House chairman James G. Carter, sponsored a bill which was initially soundly defeated in the House. Largely as a result of efforts by Mr. Carter, the bill was eventually passed. Horace Mann, President of the Massachusetts State Senate at the time, was appointed the board's first Secretary. One of Mann's earliest backers was industrialist Edmund Dwight, who subsidized Mann's salary for the duration that he served as secretary, and for several years funded his successor. Dwight had such an influence on the boards establishment that following his death in 1849, the subsequent annual report lauded him saying:

"it was through his exertions, perhaps, more than any other individual, that this Board was established...To obtain the highest order of talent in the office of its Secretary, he at the outset engaged to increase the compensation allowed to that officer by the State to an amount which secured that object...[when] it was feared that it would be difficult to obtain an appropriation from the legislature sufficient for the trial of the experiment, he promptly placed in the hands of the Secretary of the Board the sum of ten thousand dollars to be used for that purpose, on the condition that the State would appropriate an equal amount for the same object."

== Composition ==
The BESE is composed of 11 members: 10 are appointed by the governor, including his Secretary of Education, who serves ex officio, and one is a public school student elected by his or her peers. The 11 voting members are: "the chairman of the student advisory council established under this section; 1 representative of a labor organization selected by the governor from a list of 3 nominees provided by the Massachusetts State Labor Council, AFL–CIO; 1 representative of business or industry selected by the governor with a demonstrated commitment to education; 1 representative of parents of school children selected by the governor from a list of 3 nominees provided by the Massachusetts Parent Teachers Association; and 6 members selected by the governor." The Chairperson of the BOE is appointed by the governor. The secretary of the BESE must be approved by a two thirds vote and serves at the Board's pleasure as the chief executive officer, the Chief State School Officer for Elementary and Secondary Education, and the Commissioner of Elementary and Secondary Education. The Commissioner attends BESE meetings, but does not vote. He is responsible for managing the Massachusetts Department of Elementary and Secondary Education and receives a salary which is determined by the Board.

Prior to legislation introduced by Governor Patrick in 2008, the BESE was composed of 9 voting members.

== Advisory Councils ==
A number of Advisory Councils, created by Chapter 15: Section 1G of the General Laws of Massachusetts, support the Board with research, recommendations and—in the case of the Student Advisory Council—is represented by a voting member of the Board. The advisory councils include:

- Adult Basic Education
- Arts Education
- Braille Literacy Advisory Council
- Digital Learning Advisory Council
- Educational Personnel
- English Learner/Bilingual Education Advisory Council
- Gifted and Talented Education
- Parent and Community Education and Involvement Advisory Council (PCEI)
- Racial Imbalance
- School and District Accountability and Assistance
- Special Education
- Student Advisory Council
- Vocational Technical Education Advisory Council

== Student membership ==
The BESE is unique in that 1 of its 11 members is a Massachusetts public school student. Legislation filed in 1971 by Governor Francis W. Sargent created the position. By this same legislation, the Massachusetts State Student Advisory Council was established. The Chairperson of this Council sits as a full voting member on the BESE. Governor Sargent said at the filing of the bill, "If we are to replace confrontation with deliberation and shouting with dialogue, youth must be invited in, not shut out. We have ... a climate where young and old can sit together, talk, and listen."

== Current members ==
Katherine Craven, Chair
Matt Hills, Vice-Chair
Patrick Tutweiler, Secretary of Education
Mary Ann Stewart, Lexington
I, Student Member, Brookline
Ericka Fischer, Worcester
Dalida Rocha, Boston
Farzana Mohamed, Newton
Kristen Smiddy, Associate Director for Accreditation
Isabella chamberlain, Student member

== Notable former members ==
- Charles Francis Adams Jr.
- Sarah Louise Arnold
- Charlie Baker
- Hosea Ballou II
- John A. Bolles
- George N. Briggs
- Phillips Brooks
- Jeremiah E. Burke
- Ella Lyman Cabot
- Elmer Hewitt Capen
- Franklin Carter
- James G. Carter
- James Freeman Clarke
- Levi L. Conant
- George H. Conley
- Isaac Davis
- Edmund Dwight
- George Barrell Emerson
- Constantine C. Esty
- Cornelius Conway Felton
- Abraham Lincoln Filene
- Frederick Perry Fish
- Frederick W. Hamilton
- Erastus Otis Haven
- Caroline Hazard
- Thomas Wentworth Higginson
- Mark Hopkins
- Gardiner Greene Hubbard
- Charles Hudson
- Thomas H. Kinnicutt
- Horatio G. Knight
- David H. Mason
- Abby May
- Alonzo Ames Miner
- Alice Freeman Palmer
- John Dudley Philbrick
- Robert Rantoul Jr.
- Paul Reville – Secretary of Education
- William Rice
- Thomas Robbins
- Horace Scudder
- John Silber, Chair
- Jared Sparks
- Elijah B. Stoddard
- Abigail Thernstrom
- Francis Amasa Walker
- Emory Washburn
- Kate Gannett Wells
- Albert Edward Winship

== Secretaries ==
- Horace Mann (1837–1848)
- Barnas Sears (1848–1855)
- George S. Boutwell (1855–1860)
- Joseph White (1860–1877)
- John W. Dickinson (1877–1893)
- Frank A. Hill (1893–1903)
- George H. Martin (1904–1909)

== See also ==
- List of admission tests to colleges and universities
- Education in Massachusetts
- Massachusetts Department of Elementary and Secondary Education
- New England Association of Schools and Colleges (NEASC)
