= Tim O'Brien (Connecticut politician) =

American politician (born 1968)

39th Mayor of New Britain
- In office November 16, 2011 – November 12, 2013
- Preceded by: Tim Stewart
- Succeeded by: Erin Stewart

Member of the Connecticut House of Representatives from the 24th district
- In office January 8, 2003 – November 15, 2011
- Preceded by: David Pudlin
- Succeeded by: Rick Lopes

Personal details
- Born: Timothy O'Brien; June 13, 1968 (age 57)
- Party: Democratic
- Spouse: Rhona Cohen
- Children: 1 biological daughter, 1 step son
- Website: Personal website

Tim O'Brien (born June 13, 1968) is an American politician who served as an elected official in Connecticut in different positions from 1997 to 2013. He was most recently Mayor of New Britain, Connecticut, serving from 2011 to 2013. From 2003 to 2011, O'Brien was a member of the Connecticut House of Representatives and represented the 24th Assembly District, which includes parts of New Britain and Newington, Connecticut. From 1997 to 2003, O'Brien was a member of the New Britain City Council.
