= Emmanuel Sanchez (politician) =

American politician

Member of the Connecticut House of Representatives from the 24th district
- Incumbent
- Assumed office January 6, 2021
- Preceded by: Rick Lopes

Personal details
- Born: July 29, 1988 (age 38) New Britain, Connecticut, U.S.
- Party: Democratic
- Education: University of Connecticut (BA)

Emmanuel "Manny" Sanchez (born July 29, 1988) is an American Democratic Party politician currently serving as a member of the Connecticut House of Representatives from the 24th district, which includes parts of New Britain and Newington, since 2021. Sanchez was first elected in 2020 over Republican Alden Russell. Sanchez currently serves as Ranking Member of the house Labor and Public Employees Committee, as well as a member of the Appropriations Committee and Education Committee.
