= Connecticut's 24th House of Representatives district =

American legislative district

Connecticut's 24th State House of Representatives district
Representative
| Emmanuel Sanchez; D |

Connecticut's 24th House of Representatives district elects one member of the Connecticut House of Representatives. It encompasses parts of Newington and New Britain. It has been represented by Democrat Emmanuel Sanchez since 2021.

== List of representatives ==
List of representatives from Connecticut's 24th State House district
| Representative | Party | Years | District home | Note |
|---|---|---|---|---|
| Elmer A. Mortensen | Republican | 1967–1973 | Newington | Seat created |
| Joseph Gregorzek | Democratic | 1973–1975 | New Britain | |
| Marcus H. Bordiere | Democratic | 1975–1979 | New Britain | |
| Joseph H. Harper Jr. | Democratic | 1979–1983 | New Britain | |
| Irene Favreau | Democratic | 1983–1989 | New Britain | |
| David Pudlin | Democratic | 1989–2003 | New Britain | |
| Tim O'Brien | Democratic | 2003–2013 | New Britain | |
| Rick Lopes | Democratic | 2013–2021 | New Britain | Elected to the Connecticut State Senate |
| Emmanuel Sanchez | Democratic | 2021– | New Britain | |

== Recent elections ==
=== 2020 ===
2020 Connecticut State House of Representatives election, District 24
| Party | Candidate | Votes | % |
|---|---|---|---|
| Democratic | Manny Sanchez | 5,658 | 61.2 |
| Republican | Alden Russell | 3,145 | 34.02 |
| Working Families | Manny Sanchez | 325 | 3.52 |
| Independent Party | Alden Russell | 117 | 1.27 |
| Total votes | | 9,245 | 100.00 |
| Democratic hold | | | |

=== 2018 ===
2018 Connecticut State House of Representatives election, District 24
| Party | Candidate | Votes | % |
|---|---|---|---|
| Democratic | Rick Lopes (incumbent) | 4,255 | 61.2 |
| Republican | Sharon Beloin-Savaadra | 2,699 | 38.80 |
| Total votes | | 6.954 | 100.00 |
| Democratic hold | | | |

=== 2016 ===
2016 Connecticut State House of Representatives election, District 24
| Party | Candidate | Votes | % |
|---|---|---|---|
| Democratic | Rick Lopes (incumbent) | 5,209 | 64.6 |
| Republican | James Sanders | 2,855 | 35.4 |
| Total votes | | 8,064 | 100.00 |
| Democratic hold | | | |

=== 2014 ===
2014 Connecticut State House of Representatives election, District 24
| Party | Candidate | Votes | % |
|---|---|---|---|
| Democratic | Rick Lopes (incumbent) | 2,680 | 49.5 |
| Republican | James Sanders | 2,489 | 46.00 |
| Working Families | Rick Lopes (incumbent) | 245 | 4.50 |
| Total votes | | 5,414 | 100.00 |
| Democratic hold | | | |

=== 2012 ===
2012 Connecticut State House of Representatives election, District 24
| Party | Candidate | Votes | % |
|---|---|---|---|
| Democratic | Rick Lopes (incumbent) | 4,962 | 66.2 |
| Republican | James Sanders | 2,531 | 33.8 |
| Total votes | | 7,493 | 100.00 |
| Democratic hold | | | |
