= David L. Dunn =

American politician, football player and coach

20th Mayor of New Britain
- In office 1934–1936
- Preceded by: George Arthur Quigley
- Succeeded by: George Arthur Quigley

Personal details
- Born: 1889; New Britain, Connecticut, U.S.
- Died: May 6, 1949 (aged 59–60); New Britain, Connecticut, U.S.
- Political party: Democratic
- Education: Yale University; Fordham University

David L. Dunn (1889 – May 6, 1949) was an American politician and college football player and coach. He served as the head football coach at the University of Vermont from 1930 to 1931. Later in his life he served as Mayor of New Britain, Connecticut from 1934 to 1936 and as Chairman of the Connecticut State School Fund from 1937 through his death in 1949.

== Football career ==
Dunn played fullback during his two years at Fordham and as both fullback and end during his two years at Yale. After college, Dunn was a practicing lawyer, but also coached the New Britain High School and New Britain Bees football teams through the 1920s, and in March 1930 was announced as the head coach for the Vermont Catamounts. He resigned as Vermont head coach after their 1931 season.

=== Head coaching record ===
Year	Team	Overall	Bowl/playoffs
Vermont Catamounts (Independent) (1930–1931)
1930	Vermont	1–7–1	
1931	Vermont	1–8	
Vermont:		2–15–1	
Total:		2–16	

== Political career ==
After leaving Vermont, Dunn entered local politics and served as Mayor of New Britain from 1934 to 1936 and as Chairman of the Connecticut State School Fund from 1937 through his death in 1949.
