= Terry Gerratana =

American politician

Theresa B. Gerratana
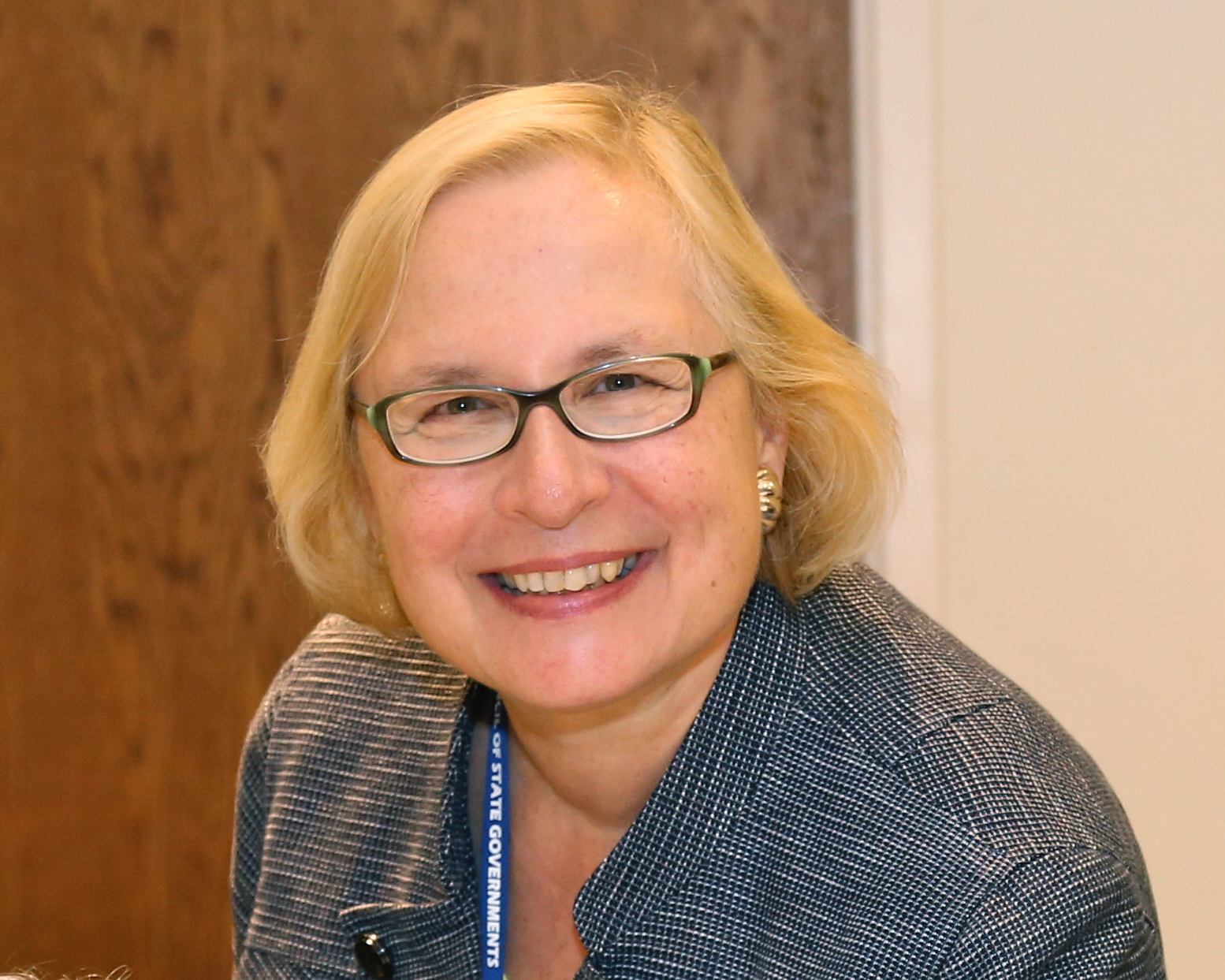

Member of the Connecticut Senate from the 6th district
- In office 2011 – January 8, 2019
- Preceded by: Donald DeFronzo
- Succeeded by: Gennaro Bizzarro

Member of the Connecticut House of Representatives from the 23rd district
- In office 1993–2003

Personal details
- Born: 1949 (age 76–77) New Britain, Connecticut, U.S.
- Party: Democratic
- Spouse: Frank J. Gerratana
- Children: Frank L. Gerratana, Gregory J. Gerratana

Theresa Bielinski Gerratana is an American politician and former member of the Connecticut State Senate, where she represented the 6th district from 2011 to 2019. She was first elected in a special election on February 22, 2011, to represent the citizens of New Britain, Berlin and Farmington. In November 2014, Gerratana was reelected by her constituents to serve a third term. She served as co-chair of the Public Health Committee and vice-chair of the Government Administration and Elections Committee.

Gerratana first served in the Connecticut General Assembly as a member of the House of Representatives for ten years, from 1993 to 2003. During her time in the House, Gerratana served as co-chair of the Human Services Committee.

Gerratana left her role in the Senate to join the Office of Health Strategy after being nominated by Governor Ned Lamont in 2019.

Preceded by Donald DeFronzo	Connecticut Senator from the Sixth District; 2011–2019	Succeeded by Genarro Bizzarro
