= Anthony Tercyak =

American politician (1924–2003)

Member of the Connecticut House of Representatives from the 26th district
- In office February 1994 – June 11, 2003
- Preceded by: Stanley Krawiec
- Succeeded by: Peter Tercyak

Personal details
- Born: February 26, 1924 New Britain, Connecticut, U.S.
- Died: June 11, 2003 (aged 79) New Britain, Connecticut, U.S.
- Party: Republican

Anthony Tercyak (February 26, 1924 – June 11, 2003) was an American politician who served in the Connecticut House of Representatives from the 26th district from 1994 until his death in 2003.

He died of a heart attack on June 11, 2003, in New Britain, Connecticut, at age 79.
