= Iris Sanchez =

American politician

Member of the Connecticut House of Representatives from the 25th district
- Incumbent
- Assumed office January 15, 2026
- Preceded by: Bobby Sanchez

Personal details
- Born: 1975 or 1976 (age 50–51) Carolina, Puerto Rico
- Party: Democratic

Iris Noemi Sanchez (born 1975/1976) is an American politician. She was elected a member of the Connecticut House of Representatives for the 25th district in a 2026 special election succeeding Bobby Sanchez (of no relation). She was a Common Council member in New Britain, Connecticut. In the city she served as Alderwoman.

Sanchez moved to New Britain in 1994 from Carolina, Puerto Rico. She is a single mother of two adult children.
