= Rick Lopes =

American politician (born 1971)

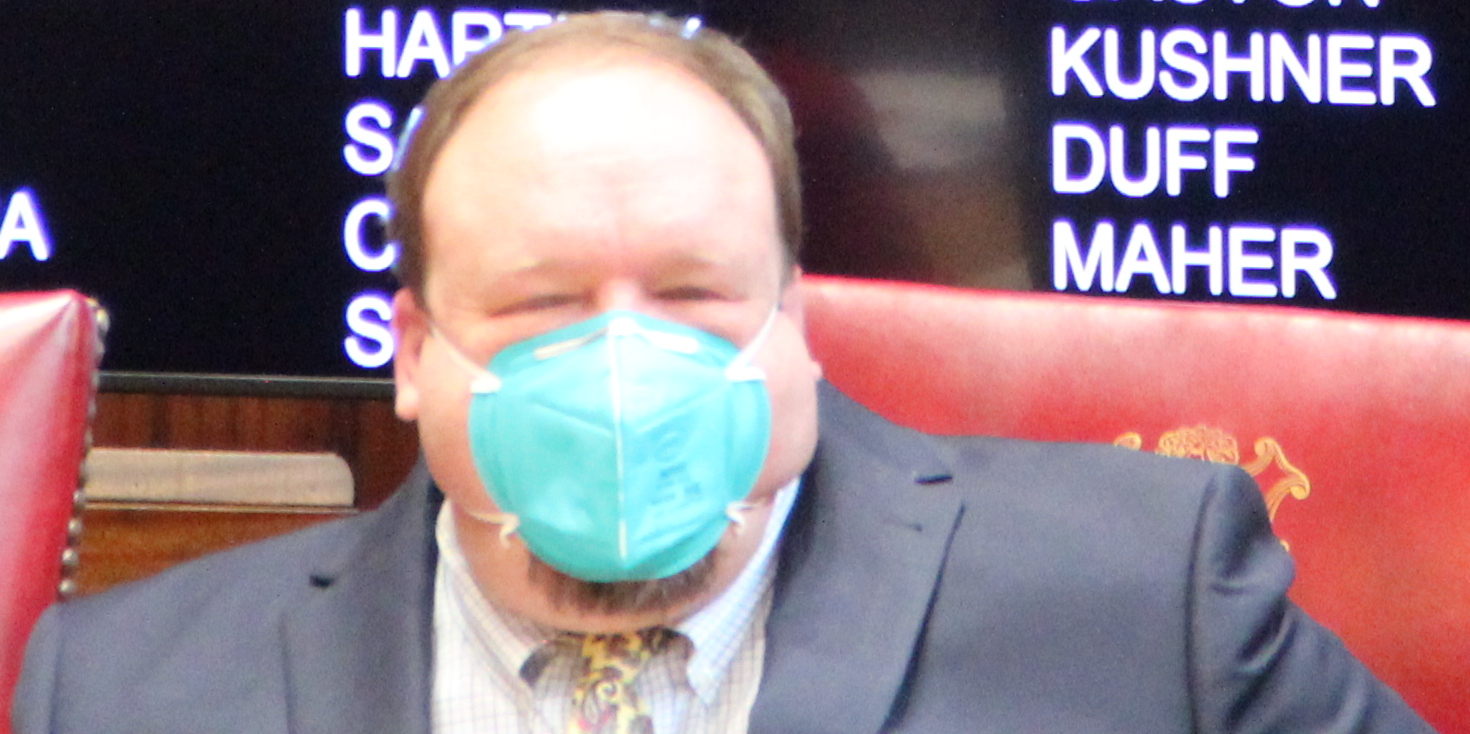
- Lopes in 2023

Member of the Connecticut State Senate from the 6th district
- Incumbent
- Assumed office January 6, 2021
- Preceded by: Gennaro Bizzarro

Member of the Connecticut House of Representatives from the 24th district
- In office January 13, 2012 – January 2021
- Preceded by: Tim O'Brien
- Succeeded by: Emmanuel Sanchez

Personal details
- Born: 1971 (age 54–55)
- Party: Democratic
- Education: University of Connecticut (BA, MSW)

Rick Lopes is an American politician who has represented the 6th District in the Connecticut State Senate since 2021. Lopes formerly represented the 24th District of the Connecticut House of Representatives Member-elect of the Connecticut State Senate. Lopes ran for the 6th District seat in the Connecticut State Senate during the 2020 election. Lopes won the election against Republican Incumbent Gennaro Bizzarro. Lopes began his two-year term in the Connecticut State Senate on January 3, 2021 and will seek re-election in 2026.

== Early career ==
Rick Lopes has owned and managed a property management business serving West Hartford, New Britain, and Hartford, Connecticut. Rick Lopes graduated from University of Connecticut with a Bachelor's degree in Literature, as well as a second Bachelor's degree in Sociology. In 2003 he earned a Master's degree in Social Work (MSW) from the University of Connecticut.

== Political career ==
Lopes won a special election in 2012 against Republican candidate Peter Steele. Steele and Lopes would go head to head in the 2012 General election as well. With Lopes being victorious. Lopes would win re-election in the 2014 election as well. Defeating Republican Gennaro Bizzarro. Lopes would win the 2016 and 2018 elections. Defeating Republicans James Sanders and Sharan Beloin-Saavedra respectively. In 2019, Rick Lopes ran against Republican State Senator Gennaro Bizzarro in a special election after Senator Terry Gerratana resigned for a position in Governor Lamont's administration where Lopes lost. However, Lopes would ultimately win the seat in a 2020 general election and help add to the Democratic majority in the Connecticut State Senate.

== Electoral history ==
=== 2020 ===
Rick Lopes defeated Republican Incumbent Gennaro Bizzarro. Bizzarro has represented the 6th District since 2019.

2020 Connecticut State Senate election, District 6
Party	Candidate	Votes	%
Democratic	Rick Lopes	19,621	53.04
Republican	Gennaro Bizzarro (incumbent)	16,372	44.26
Working Families	Rick Lopes	1,000	2.70
Total votes		36,993	100.00
Democratic gain from Republican			

=== 2022 ===
Rick Lopes defeated Republican Challenger Tremell Collins. Collins has previously ran two other campaigns in 2018 and 2017, losing both.

2022 Connecticut State Senate election, District 6
Party	Candidate	Votes	%
Democratic	Rick Lopes (incumbent)	13,174	53.91
Republican	Tremell Collins	10,666	43.64
Working Families	Rick Lopes	597	2.43
Total votes		24,437	100.00

=== 2024 ===
Rick Lopes defeated Republican Challenger Tremell Collins. Collins has previously ran three other campaigns in 2022, 2018 and 2017, losing all.

2024 Connecticut State Senate election, District 6
Party	Candidate	Votes	%
Democratic	Rick Lopes (incumbent)	20.160	58.4
Republican	Tremell Collins	14.337	41.6
Working Families	Rick Lopes		
Total votes		34,497	100.00
