= Common school =

Public schools in the 19th-century U.S.

A common school was a public school in the United States during the 19th century. Horace Mann (1796–1859) was a strong advocate for public education and the common school. In 1837, the state of Massachusetts appointed Mann as the first secretary of the State Board of Education where he began a revival of common school education, the effects of which extended throughout America during the 19th century.

== Early development ==
Common schools originated in New England as community-funded instruments of education for all children of the region or neighborhood. These secondary schools furthered the Puritan conformity of the region by institutionalizing religion into the curriculum for the purpose of instilling good morals and obedience in the populace. The 17th-century Puritan relied upon Christian organizations, such as the Anglican Society for the Propagation of the Gospel in Foreign Parts, for catechisms as the first grammar books. In most cases, local church clergy took responsibility for education in their communities. With support from the community and wealthy philanthropists, clergy determined the curriculum, material, and teachers for common schools throughout the 17th and 18th centuries.

The religious sensibility of New England education was further augmented by the First Great Awakening. Rev. Cotton Mather (1663-1728) stated that the schools had been instruments for maintaining the pre-eminence of the godly. Reflecting this sentiment, in 1742, neighboring Connecticut enacted a law restricting New Light schools during the First Great Awakening. The law declared "the erecting of any other schools, which are not under the establishment and inspection aforesaid, may tend to train up youth in ill principles, and practices, and introduce such disorders as may be of fatal consequence to the public peace and weal of this Colony."

== 19th-century reform ==
=== Horace Mann ===
From 1837 until 1848, Horace Mann led the reform on education in Massachusetts as a lawyer, Massachusetts State senator, and the first secretary of the Massachusetts State Board of Education. Mann struggled to create a universal standard for state education because schools were characterized by their regional and communal differences. State congressman James G. Carter (1795–1849) explained that the state shifted responsibility for the preservation of classroom standards from the schools to the towns; the towns shifted responsibility to districts; and the districts had shifted it to individuals. In order to influence and educate the public, he published annual reports and founded the Common School Journal to report on Massachusetts' schools. In 1839, the first normal school for teachers was established in Lexington, Massachusetts in an effort to produce standardized, methodological teaching.

=== Henry Barnard ===
Henry Barnard (1811-1900) was a fellow educational reformer in Rhode Island. In the 1840s, Barnard worked closely with Governor James Fenner to evaluate and reform the common schools of the state. In 1845, Barnard established Rhode Island's first teaching institute. In 1866, St. John's College offered Barnard the presidency which he filled until the following year. From 1867-1870, Barnard served as the nation's first United States Commissioner of Education. The practical service of education was a promotion of industrialism. Barnard repeatedly proposed moral instruction instilled the virtuous habits of "industry, frugality, and respect for property rights." This utilitarian outlook reflected a changing world in the wake of the Industrial Revolution and emphasized a need to adapt education to meet the changing need of an industrial world.

== Curriculum ==
Common schools typically taught "the three Rs" (reading, [w]riting, and [a]rithmetic), history, geography, and math. The McGuffey Reader was the favorite schoolroom text in the 19th century, surpassing influence of Noah Webster's blue-backed speller. A strong emphasis on spiritual and moral lessons mixed into the text's lessons. There was wide variation in regard to grading (from 0-100 grading to no grades at all), but end-of-the-year recitations were a common way that parents were informed about what their children were learning.

=== Moral instruction ===
The intention of common schools was to equip every child with moral instruction and "equalize the conditions of men." The emphasis on morality in the classroom remained a strong element of education. As the fervor of the Second Great Awakening declined, the instruments of teaching morality changed from overtly Biblical to an attempt at a neutral approach. Implementing the philosophy of phrenology, moral instruction began to use a scientific approach and rejected the old dogmatic method of imparting moral instruction.

=== Controversy ===
Although common schools were designed by Horace Mann to be nonsectarian, there were several fierce battles, most notably in New York City and Philadelphia, where Roman Catholic immigrants and Native Americans objected to the use of the King James Version of the Bible. Tensions were especially high in cities with large immigrant populations. In 1844, The Philadelphia Nativist riots (Bible Riots) began as a result of tensions between nativists and immigrants, due in part to a rumor that Catholic immigrants would remove Protestant Bibles from classroom curriculums. Even without Bible readings, most common schools taught children the general Protestant values (e.g., work ethic) of 19th-century America.

== Common school era ==
States and territories began to emulate and adopt Massachusetts' common school system. Educators saw it as their responsibility to civilize the American frontier. In 1862 and 1890, the United States Congress passed the Morrill Land-Grant Acts, which erected a statute to sell public lands to build and fund state universities for the purpose of propagating instruction in agriculture and mechanical arts. This was the federal government's first move to fund public education.

The common school era is viewed by many education scholars to have ended around 1900. In the early twentieth century, schools generally became more regional (as opposed to local), and control of schools moved away from elected school boards, and towards professional control. Because common schools were not special-purpose districts, voters often decided in called elections to join independent or unified school districts.

== Sources ==
- Merle Curti (1935). Social Ideas of American Educators. Charles Scribner's Sons.
