= David Pudlin =

American politician (1952–2021)

Member of the Connecticut House of Representatives from the 24th district
- In office January 4, 1989 – January 8, 2003
- Preceded by: Irene Favreau
- Succeeded by: Tim O'Brien

Personal details
- Born: July 24, 1952 New Britain, Connecticut, U.S.
- Died: March 19, 2021 (aged 68) New Britain, Connecticut, U.S.
- Party: Democratic

David Pudlin (July 24, 1952 – March 19, 2021) was an American politician who served in the Connecticut House of Representatives from the 24th district from 1989 to 2003.

He died on March 19, 2021, in New Britain, Connecticut at age 68.
