= Edmund Dwight =

American industrialist, educational reformer and entrepreneur

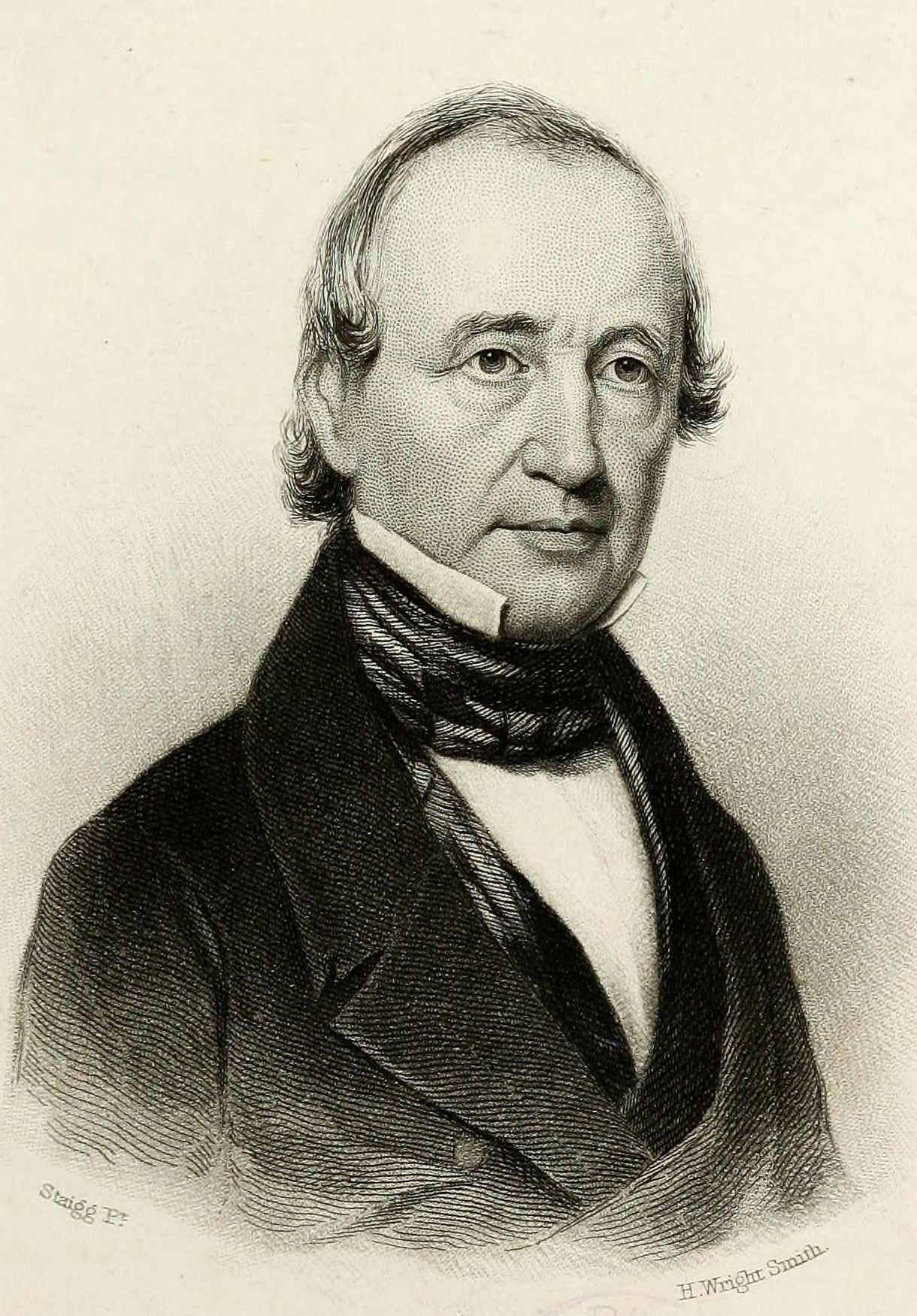
- Edmund Dwight, c. 1849
- Born: November 28, 1780; Springfield, Massachusetts, United States
- Died: April 5, 1849 (aged 68); Boston, Massachusetts, United States
- Known for: Founding of Massachusetts Board of Education; Dwight Manufacturing Company; Establishment of Hadley Falls Company; Establishment of Cleveland, Columbus and Cincinnati Railroad
- Spouse: Mary Harrison Eliot (m. 1809)
- Children: Mary Eliot Dwight (1821-1879); Sophia Dwight (1823-1879); Edmond Dwight (1824-1900); Elizabeth Dwight (1830-1901)

Edmund Dwight (November 28, 1780 – April 5, 1849) was a prominent American industrialist, educational reformer, and entrepreneur. He was known for being one of the chief supporters of the Massachusetts Board of Education, providing much of its early funding. He is also noted for his industrial ventures such as his role in establishing the Hadley Falls Company.

== Biography ==
Dwight was born on November 28, 1780 at Springfield, Massachusetts. He was a descendant of the famous Dwight Massachusetts family noted for its business operations that emerged out of Springfield in the 1790s. Dwight's father, Jonathan Dwight was a second cousin to Timothy Dwight, a celebrated theologian, poet, and a president of Yale College.

Dwight's early education was conducted at home. He studied law and travelled to Europe before joining the family business. He married the daughter of a wealthy Boston merchant in 1809. By 1820s, the Dwight family had pioneered the textile industry in Springfield. In 1822, he co-founded Day, Brewer, & Dwight, which operated in a corner store, at Springfield.

Dwight was one of the Boston Associates who established the Hadley Falls Company which built Holyoke, Massachusetts, and providing early backing for the Cleveland, Columbus and Cincinnati Railroad. He was one of those who spearheaded the construction of the railroad connecting Boston and Albany. The company, which was co-founded by Thomas H. Perkins, and George W. Lyman, was incorporated for the construction and maintenance of a dam across the Connecticut River. The harnessed water power was used by investors manufacturing cotton, wood, iron, wool, and other materials. Dwight was also responsible for the opening of various manufacturing companies along the Chicopee River, including textile manufacturing facilities of the Boston Associates.

Dwight was also an early founder of the American Antiquarian Society, backing Isiah Thomas with several other prominent Boston businessmen.
