= Charles A. Morey =

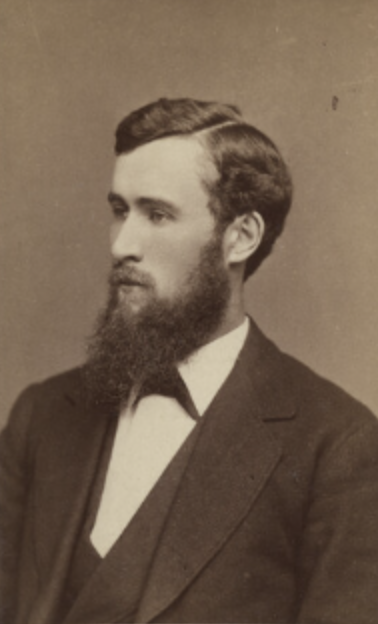
- Morey C. 1872

3rd Principal of Winona Normal School
- In office December 6, 1876 – May 13, 1879
- Preceded by: William F. Phelps
- Succeeded by: Irwin Shepard

Personal details
- Born: August 9, 1851 Vershire, Vermont
- Died: September 26, 1904 (aged 53) Winona, Minnesota
- Education: Winona Normal School; Boston School of Technology

Charles Anson Morey (August 9, 1851 – September 26, 1904) was an American attorney, educator, and inventor. He served as third Principal of the Winona Normal School, now Winona State University, from 1876–1879.

== Biography ==
Morey's Phonautograph of the vowel 'oo'

Morey was born in Vershire, Vermont, on August 9, 1851. In 1872, Morey graduated from Winona Normal School. Following his graduation, he would study at the Boston School of Technology (now MIT). While there, he invented his own version of the phonautograph in 1874, which was the first one capable of scientific use. His phonautograph would be used by Alexander Graham Bell to record the first vowel sounds. Specifically, it was used to record the vowel 'oo', as in 'mood'. It remained unable to be converted back into sound until ~2015.

=== At Winona ===
He would become Principal of the Winona Normal School in 1876, serving for three years. Morey was first acting principal, and was formally elected principal on December 6, 1876, and formally took office on January 1, 1877. He resigned on May 13, 1879. During his term, the Department of Natural Sciences was founded. The demand placed upon the school had grown immensely from its founding to Morey's taking of office, due to the rapid expansion of Minnesota's population and the school system. Morey would focus in his first year on increasing academic performance. He was successful, bringing average grades to their highest level in the school's history. His second year was focused on increasing the quality of graduates by implementing more rigorous entrance exams and expanding the number of subjects taught. This led to a decrease in enrollment, as Morey had predicted. However, the prestige of the normal school would begin to increase. Known for his oratory and debate skills, he became an attorney following his resignation. He continued to be involved in the school, serving as resident director from 1888 until his death. He briefly served as acting president of the school from May to June of 1898.

He died in 1904 and is buried at Woodlawn Cemetary in Winona. Morey Hall at Winona State University is named after him.
