= Massachusetts State Student Advisory Council =

The Massachusetts State Student Advisory Council (SSAC) is a democratic student organization, whose statewide Chairperson serves as a voting member on the Massachusetts Board of Education. The Council has three main objectives:

1. To consider all matters that its membership deem appropriate concerning education at the local, state and national levels; to make proposals and recommendations to the Massachusetts Board of Education concerning such matters; and to suggest guidelines and legislation to improve the quality of education throughout the Commonwealth.
2. To encourage, support and work with the Regional Student Advisory Councils, interested student organizations, and interested individuals on matters of common concern; and to maintain close liaisons with the appropriate organizations in the educational, legal and social communities.
3. To pursue the above objectives through the following general activities: researching, introducing, supporting and aiding in the implementation of state and national legislation of interest to the Council; maintaining and strengthening existing avenues of communication and establishing new ones among agencies concerned with or involved in the administration of education throughout the Commonwealth and the nation; endorsing or conducting conferences dealing with important student issues; providing the State Board of Education with opinions, ideas, proposals, suggested guidelines, and other information of concern to students throughout the Commonwealth, and assisting the student Board member who is acting as representative of the Council.

== Organization ==
The current SSAC officers have recently been elected. The tasks of each position are distributed amongst the officers based on specific criteria.

Former SSAC officers include Ela Gardiner (Greater Boston) Hannah Trimarchi (Northeast), Maya Matthews (Greater Boston), Eleni Livingston (Greater Boston), Nathan Moore (Greater Boston), Zachary Tsetsos (Central Mass), and Irene Wu (Greater Boston), Eric Plankey (Northeast), among others.

The SSAC Chairperson (referred to as a Student Chairperson) is an SSAC Delegate elected by his/her peers to represent SSAC as a full-voting member on the Massachusetts Board of Elementary & Secondary Education. In addition to the responsibilities of an SSAC member (as above), the SSAC Chairperson is required to attend all Board of Elementary and Secondary Education meetings and to then solicit feedback from SSAC regarding matters before the Board. The chairperson is also tasked with preparing written Board Briefing for dissemination to SSAC and RSAC members as well as to coordinate communication between SSAC's various boards and committees. The current chairperson is Ioannis (Yiannis) Asikis.

The SSAC Vice Chairperson is an SSAC Delegate elected by his/her peers. In addition to the responsibilities of an SSAC member, the SSAC Vice-Chairperson's roles and responsibilities also include the facilitation of SSAC meetings including the arrangement of meeting agendas, collaboration with the SSAC chairperson, coordination of regional issues with the appropriate counterparts, and to perform the duties of Recorder for SSAC. The Student Chairperson will also attend Board of Elementary and Secondary Education meetings once a month, however he/she will not have full voting rights. The current vice chairperson is Nasiba Alikulova.

The official title of both the SSAC Chairperson and the SSAC Vice Chairperson is "Student Chairperson of the State Student Advisory Council to the Massachusetts Board of Elementary and Secondary Education".

The SSAC Communications Chair (Formerly Secretary-Treasurer–now referred to as a Communications Coordinator) is an SSAC Delegate elected by his/her peers. In addition to the responsibilities of a regular SSAC member, the SSAC Communication Coordinator's roles and responsibilities also include the task of secretary at all meetings and to organize and file information on the activities and progress of SSAC's various workgroups and councils. In recent years, the SSAC Communications Chair has organized concerns and ideas of SSAC delegates for the SSAC Chairperson to present at BESE meetings. Additionally, the shift from paper documentation to electronic documentation has largely been overseen by recent Communication Chairs. The current Communication Chair is Elliott Talley.

The official title of the SSAC Communications Coordinator is "State Student Advisory Council Communications Chair".

== History ==
The SSAC was established by the Massachusetts State Legislature with Chapter 1009 of the Acts of 1971 as one of the first organizations to provide for direct student involvement in statewide decision-making in education. Governor Francis W. Sargent filed this legislation stating, "If we are to replace confrontation with deliberation and shouting with dialogue, youth must be invited in, not shut out. We have ... a climate where young and old can sit together, talk, and listen."

The SAC is composed of five Regions that consist of eleven councils total (two for each region except for Greater Boston which receives three councils due to its large amount of representation) and the State Council. According to Chapter 15: Section 1E of the General Laws of Massachusetts, every secondary school must elect two delegates to a Regional SAC. Each Regional Council elects eight (Greater Boston elects twelve) members to the State SAC. The State SAC has its own projects, but also helps coordinate those of the Regional SACs. The SSAC serves as a communication network to share educational information among all students.
