= Of Plymouth Plantation =

Journal by William Bradford, leader of the Plymouth Colony

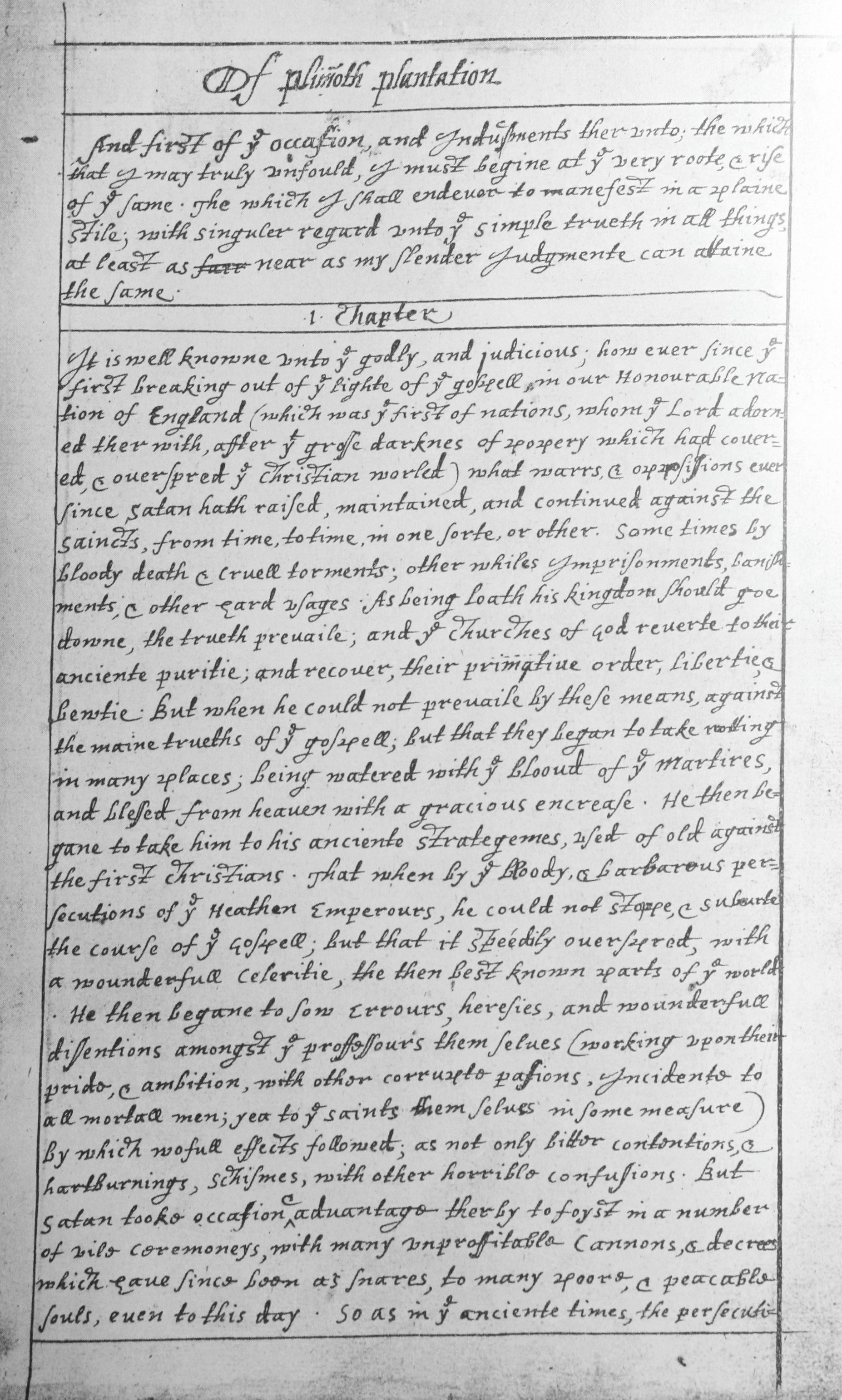
The front page of the Bradford journal

Of Plymouth Plantation is a journal that was written over a period of years by William Bradford, the leader of the Plymouth Colony in present day Massachusetts. It is regarded as the most authoritative primary source account of the Pilgrims and the early years of the colony which they founded.

The journal was written between 1630 and 1651 and describes the story of the Pilgrims from 1608, when they settled in the Dutch Republic on the European mainland through the 1620 Mayflower voyage to the New World, until the year 1647. The book ends with a list of Mayflower passengers and what happened to them which was written in 1651.

Bradford's original manuscript disappeared during the American Revolutionary War, when British troops occupied the Boston church where it was held. It eventually resurfaced in the Bishop of London's library at Fulham Palace, and was brought back into print in 1856. In 1897, Senator George Frisbie Hoar started a dispute over the ownership of the manuscript. The bishop's Consistorial and Episcopal Court of London ordered for a photographic copy of the manuscript's records to be made for the court, and for the original to be delivered to the Governor of Massachusetts. The manuscript was presented to the Governor during a joint session of the legislature on May 26, 1897. Since that time, the manuscript has been kept in the State Library of Massachusetts. In June 1897, the state legislature ordered publication of the history with copies of the documents associated with the return.

== Naming ==
The document has carried many names. At the top of the original text is Of Plim̃oth Plantation, (Note: The diacritic above the letter m indicates a doubling of the nasal consonant, implying the spelling Plimmoth.) but newer prints of the text often use the modern spelling, "Plymouth." The text of Bradford's journal is often called the History of Plymouth Plantation.

When Samuel Wilberforce quoted Bradford's work in A History of the Protestant Episcopal Church in America in 1844, the document was cited as History of the Plantation of Plymouth. It is also sometimes called William Bradford's Journal. A version published by the Commonwealth of Massachusetts (after the return of the manuscript from England in 1897) is titled Bradford's History "Of Plimoth Plantation" while labeled The Bradford History on the spine. It has also been called The Mayflower, although it is not a ship's log and was written after the events.

== Bradford's material ==
Bradford, Edward Winslow, and others contributed material to George Morton, who merged everything into a letter which he published as Mourt's Relation in London in 1622. It was primarily a journal of the colonists' first years at Plymouth.

The Bradford journal records the events of the first 30 years of Plymouth Colony, as well as the reactions of the colonists to those events. It is regarded by historians as the preeminent work of 17th century America. The journal is Bradford's simple account that has made the Pilgrims what Samuel Eliot Morison called the "spiritual ancestors of all Americans".

Bradford apparently never made an effort to publish the manuscript during his lifetime, but he did intend it to be preserved and read by others. He wrote at the end of chapter 6:

I have been the larger in these things, and so shall crave leave in some like passages following, (though in other things I shall labour to be more contract) that their children may see with what difficulties their fathers wrestled in going through these things, and how God brought them along notwithstanding all their weaknesses and infirmities. As also that some use may be made hereof in after times by others in such like weighty employments; and herewith I will end this chapter.

== History of the manuscript ==
Bradford's original manuscript was left in the tower of the Old South Meeting House in Boston during the American Revolutionary War. British troops occupied the church during the war, and the manuscript disappeared—and remained lost for the next century. Some scholars noted that Samuel Wilberforce quoted Bradford's work in A History of the Protestant Episcopal Church in America in 1844, and the missing manuscript was finally discovered in the Bishop of London's library at Fulham Palace; it was brought back into print in 1856. Americans made many formal proposals that the manuscript should be returned to its home in New England, but to no avail. Massachusetts Senator George Frisbie Hoar started an initiative in 1897, supported by the Pilgrim Society, the American Antiquarian Society, and the New England Society of New York.

Bishop of London Frederick Temple learned of the importance of the book, and he thought that it should be returned to America. But it was being held by the Church of England and the Archbishop of Canterbury needed to approve such a move—and the Archbishop was Frederick Temple by the time that Hoar's request reached England. The bishop's Consistorial and Episcopal Court of London observed that nobody could say for certain exactly how the book arrived in London, but he argued that the marriage and birth registry which it contained should have been deposited with the Church in the first place, and thus the book was a church document and the Diocese of London had proper control of it. The court, however, observed that the Diocese of London was not the proper repository for that information at the time when the Thirteen Colonies declared independence in 1776. So the bishop's court ordered that a photographic copy of the records be made for the court, and that the original be delivered to the Governor of Massachusetts.

The Bradford journal was presented to the Governor of the Commonwealth of Massachusetts during a joint session of the legislature on May 26, 1897. It is on deposit in the State Library of Massachusetts in the State House in Boston. In June 1897, the state legislature ordered publication of the history with copies of the documents associated with the return. In 1912, the Massachusetts Historical Society published a final authorized version of the text.

William Bradford's manuscript journal is a vellum-bound volume measuring 11 1/2 by 7 3/4 inches (292 × 197 mm). There are 270 pages numbered (sometimes inaccurately) by Bradford. In 2015, the manuscript was conserved and digitized at The Northeast Document Conservation Center. The ink is slightly faded and has turned brown with age, but it is still completely legible. The pages are somewhat foxed, but otherwise the 400 year-old document is in remarkably good condition. Page 243 is missing, with a note from Prence that it was missing when he got the document.

== From the journal ==
Describing the Pilgrims' safe arrival at Cape Cod aboard the Mayflower:

Being thus arived in a good harbor and brought safe to land, they fell upon their knees & blessed ye God of heaven, who had brought them over ye vast & furious ocean, and delivered them from all ye periles & miseries therof, againe to set their feete on ye firme and stable earth, their proper elemente. And no marvell if they were thus joyefull, seeing wise Seneca was so affected with sailing a few miles on ye coast of his owne Italy; as he affirmed, that he had rather remaine[d] twentie years on his way by land, then pass by sea to any place in a short time; so tedious & dreadfull was ye same unto him.
But hear I cannot but stay and make a pause, and stand half amased at this poore peoples presente condition; and so I thinke will the reader too, when he well considers ye same. Being thus passed ye vast ocean, and a sea of troubles before in their preparation (as may be remembered by yt which wente before), they had now no friends to wellcome them, nor inns to entertaine or refresh their weatherbeaten bodys, no houses or much less townes to repaire too, to seeke for succoure ...
Let it also be considered what weake hopes of supply & succoure they left behinde them, yt might bear up their minds in this sade condition and trialls they were under; and they could not but be very smale. It is true, indeed, ye affections & love of their brethren at Leyden was cordiall & entire towards them, but they had little power to help them, or them selves; and how ye case stode betweene them & ye marchants at their coming away, hath already been declared. What could not sustaine them but ye spirite of God & his grace? May not & ought not the children of these fathers rightly say : Our faithers were Englishmen which came over this great ocean, and were ready to perish in this willdernes; but they cried unto ye Lord, and he heard their voyce, and looked on their adversitie, &c. Let them therfore praise ye Lord, because he is good, & his mercies endure for ever. ...

Bradford describes the initiation of a conflict with the Pequots and their eventual defeat by the colonists and their Narragansett and Mohegan allies:

Anno Dom: 1637.

IN ye fore parte of this year, the Pequents fell openly upon ye English at Conightecute, in ye lower parts of ye river, and slew sundry of them, (as they were at work in ye feilds,) both men & women, to ye great terrour of ye rest; and wente away in great prid & triumph, with many high threats. They allso assalted a fort at ye rivers mouth, though strong and well defended; and though they did not their prevaile, yet it struk them with much fear & astonishmente to see their bould attempts in the face of danger; which made them in all places to stand upon their gard, and to prepare for resistance, and ernestly to solissite their freinds and confederats in ye Bay of Massachusets to send them speedy aide, for they looked for more forcible assaults.

[...]

In ye mean time, the Pequents, espetially in ye winter before, sought to make peace with ye Narigansets, and used very pernicious arguments to move them therunto: as that ye English were stranegers and begane to overspred their countries and would deprive them therof in time, if they were suffered to grow & increse; and if ye Narigansets did assist ye English to subdue them, they did but make way for their owne overthrow, for if they were rooted out, the English would soone take occasion to subjugate them; and if they would harken to them, they should not neede to fear ye strength of ye English; for they would not come to open battle with them, but fire their houses, kill their katle, and lye in ambush for them as they went abroad upon their occasions; and all this they might easily doe without any or litle danger to them selves. The which course being, held, they well saw the English could not long subsiste, but they would either be starved with hunger, or be forced to forsake the countrie; with many ye like things; inso much that ye Narigansets were once wavering, and were halfe minded to have made peace with them, and joyed against ye English. But againe when they considered, how much, wrong they had received from the Pequents, and what an oppertunitie they now had by ye help of ye English to right them selves, revenge was so sweete unto them, as it prevailed above all ye rest; so as they resolved to joyne with ye English against them, & did.

[...]

From Connightecute (who were most sencible of ye hurt sustained, & ye present danger), they sett out a partie of men, and another partie mett them from ye Bay, at ye Narigansets, who were to joyne with them. Ye Narigansets were ernest to be gone before ye English were well rested and refreshte, espetially some of them which came last.

It should seeme their desire was to come upon ye enemie sudenly, & undiscovered. Ther was a barke of this place, newly put in ther, which was come from Conightecutte, who did encourage them to lay hold of ye Indeans forwardness and to shew as great forwardnes as they, for it would incorage them, and expedition might prove to their great advantage. So they went on, and so ordered their march, as the Indeans brought them to a forte of ye enimies (in which most of their cheefe men were) before day. They approached ye same with great silence, and surrounded it both with English & Indeans, that they might not breake out; and so assualted them with great courage, shooting, amongst them, and entered ye forte with all speed; and those yt first entered found sharp resistance from the enimie, who both shott at & grapled with them; others rane into their howses, & brought out fire, and sett them on fire, which soone tooke in their matts, &, standing close togeather, with ye wind, all was quietly on a flame, and therby more were burnte to death then was otherwise slain; it burnte their bowstrings, and made them unservisable. Those yt scaped ye fire were slaine with ye sword; some hewed to peeces, others rune throw with their rapiers, so as they were quickly dispatchte, and very few escaped. It was conceived they thus destroyed about 400 at this time. It was a fearfull sight to see them thus frying, in ye fyer, and ye streams of blood quenching ye same, and horrible was ye stinck & sente ther of; but ye victory seemed a sweete sacrifice, and they gave the prays therof to God, who had wrought so wonderfuly for them, thus to inclose their enimise in their hands, and give them so speedy a victory over so proud & insulting an enimie. The Narigansett Indeans, all this while, stood round aboute, but aloofe from all danger, and left ye whole execution to ye English, exept it were ye stoping of any yt broke away, insulting over their enimies in this their ruine & miserie, when they saw them dancing in ye flames, calling them by a word in their owne language, signifing, O brave Pequents! which they used familierly among them selves in their own prayes, in songs of triumph after their victories.

== See also ==
- Mayflower Compact
