= Bobby Sanchez =

American politician

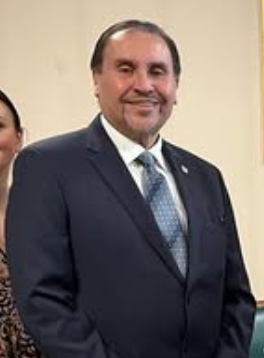
- Sanchez in 2026

41st Mayor of New Britain
- Incumbent
- Assumed office November 12, 2025
- Preceded by: Erin Stewart

Member of the Connecticut House of Representatives from the 25th district
- In office January 5, 2011 – November 12, 2025
- Preceded by: John C. Geragosian
- Succeeded by: Iris Sanchez

Personal details
- Born: Robert Sanchez; February 15, 1961 (age 65) New Britain, Connecticut, U.S.
- Party: Democratic
- Spouse: Nebeska Sanchez
- Children: 1
- Education: Springfield College (BA, MA)

Robert "Bobby" C. Sanchez (born February 15, 1961) is an American politician serving as the 41st Mayor of New Britain, Connecticut. Previously a member of the Connecticut House of Representatives from the 25th district from 2011 to 2025, he resigned his seat shortly after taking office as Mayor on November 12, 2025.

== Early life and education ==
Sanchez was born in New Britain, Connecticut in 1961. He earned a Bachelor of Arts and Master of Arts degree from Springfield College.

== Career ==
Outside of politics, Sanchez works as a case manager for the Human Resources Agency of New Britain. He also served as a member of the New Britain Democratic Town Committee, the New Britain Human Rights Commission, and New Britain Housing Coalition Board. Sanchez was elected to the Connecticut House of Representatives in November 2010 and assumed office in 2011. During his tenure, Sanchez served as vice chair and co-chair of the House Education Committee. Sanchez was a candidate for mayor of New Britain, Connecticut in November 2021, losing to incumbent Erin Stewart. Four years later, in November 2025, he won the mayoral race against Sharon Beloin-Saavedra.

== Personal life ==
Sanchez and his wife, Nebeska Sanchez, have one son.

== See also ==
- Connecticut's 27th House of Representatives district
