= David DeFronzo =

American politician

Member of the Connecticut House of Representatives from the 26th district
- Incumbent
- Assumed office January 8, 2025
- Preceded by: Peter Tercyak

Personal details
- Born: 1977 (age 48–49)
- Party: Democratic Party
- Parent: Donald DeFronzo (father)
- Website: https://www.defronzo2024.com/

David DeFronzo is an American politician and member of the Connecticut House of Representatives since 2024 from the 26th district, which contains parts of New Britain.

DeFronzo is a former city council member. His father is former state senator Donald DeFronzo.
