= Walnut Hill District =

Historic district in Connecticut, United States

- U.S. National Register of Historic Places
- U.S. Historic district
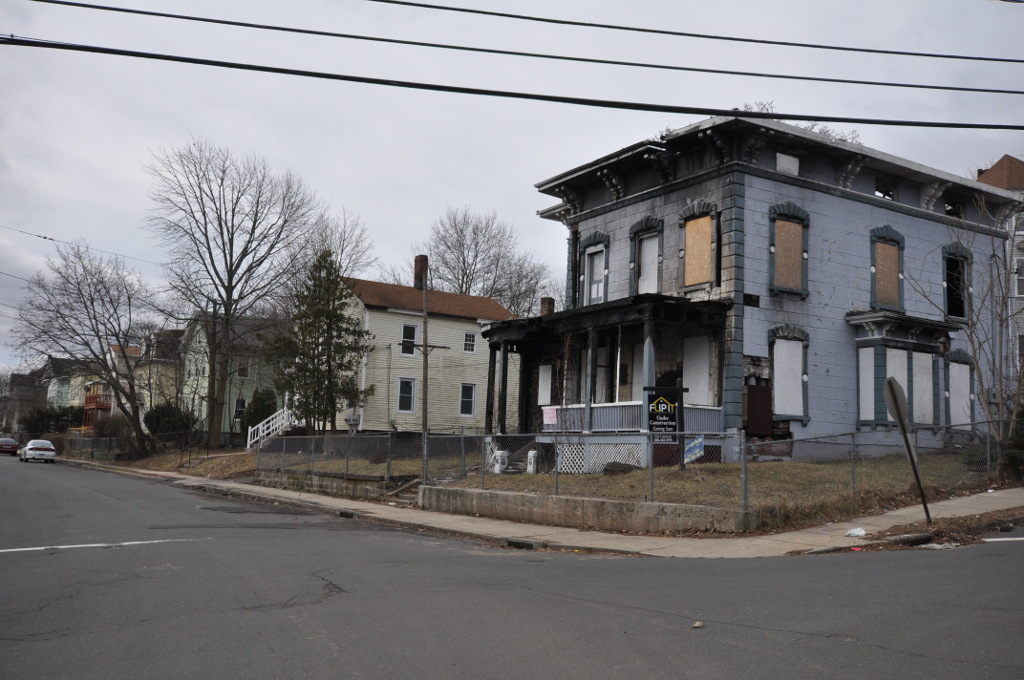

- Location within Connecticut Location within the United States
- Location: Irregular pattern roughly bounded by Hart, Arch, West Main and Lake Streets, and Walnut Hill Park, New Britain, Connecticut
- Coordinates: 41°39′51″N 72°47′2″W
- Area: 36 acres (15 ha)
- Built: 1840
- Architect: Briggs, Warren; Et al
- Architectural style: Gothic, Queen Anne, Italianate
- NRHP reference No.: 75001936
- Added to NRHP: September 2, 1975

The Walnut Hill District in New Britain, Connecticut, is a historic district that primarily showcases residential architecture reflecting the city's growth as an industrial hub from the mid-19th century through the early 20th century. The district, listed on the National Register of Historic Places in 1975, is bordered by Walnut Hill Park, New Britain General Hospital, and the streets of West Main, Main, Arch, and Hart.

== Description and history ==
New Britain was a primarily agricultural community and part of Berlin and Farmington until its separate incorporation in 1850. Its industrial history began with small metalworking shops that grew in size and scope, until it was one of the leading centers of tool manufacture in the country. The Walnut Hill neighborhood is sandwiched between the city's downtown and Walnut Hill Park, which was originally built out as a water supply reservoir, but was converted into a public park in the 1860s.

Architecturally, the district is diverse, featuring homes built between 1840 and 1930. Most of these are wood-frame structures, similar in size and scale, creating a cohesive neighborhood feel despite varying architectural styles. The Italianate style is the most prevalent, particularly from the 1850s and 1860s, reflecting the city's industrial boom during that period. A notable example is the David Nelson Camp House at 9 Camp Street, a fine representation of Italianate architecture.

The district's boundaries are carefully drawn to maintain its residential character, excluding commercial areas along West Main, Main, and Arch Streets, as well as larger apartment buildings. However, significant structures like the Lutheran Church and the state armory on Arch Street, along with the 1881 state normal school buildings on Hillside Place, are included within the district. In total, the district includes 145 structures of historic significance, making it a key area for understanding the architectural and industrial history of New Britain.

== See also ==
- National Register of Historic Places listings in Hartford County, Connecticut
