= James G. Carter =

American politician (1795–1849)

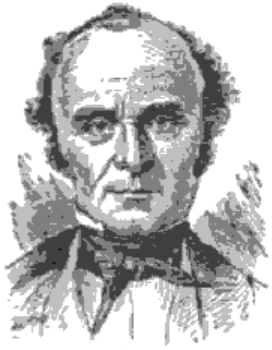

Member of the Massachusetts House of Representatives

Personal details
- Born: James Carter, Jr. September 7, 1795 Leominster, Massachusetts
- Died: July 22, 1849 (aged 53) Chicago, Illinois

James Gordon Carter (1795–1845), born James Carter, Jr. in Leominster, Massachusetts, was a member of the Massachusetts House of Representatives and an education reformer. He was educated at Groton Academy and Harvard College.

He wrote Influence of an Early Education in 1826 (Essays Upon Popular Education), and in 1837, as House Chairman of the Committee on Education, contributed to the establishment of the Massachusetts Board of Education, the first state board of education in the United States. This was an important stepping stone in the path to government funded schooling. To the disappointment of many of Carter's supporters, who felt he deserved the honor, Horace Mann was appointed the board's first secretary.

Carter was also instrumental in the reformation of teacher education, and establishment of the first Normal school which later became Framingham State College. This earned him the sobriquet: "Father of the American Normal School."

He died in Chicago on July 22, 1849.

The James G. Carter Junior High School in Leominster, Massachusetts (now defunct) was named after him.
