= Connecticut's 6th State Senate district =

American legislative district

Senator
Rick Lopes; D

Connecticut's 6th State Senate district elects one member of the Connecticut State Senate. It consists of the towns of New Britain, Berlin, and part of the town of Farmington. It is currently represented by Democrat Rick Lopes.

== Recent elections ==
=== 2020 ===
2020 Connecticut State Senate election, District 6
Party	Candidate	Votes	%
Democratic	Rick Lopes	19,621	53.04
Republican	Gennaro Bizzarro (incumbent)	16,372	44.26
Working Families	Rick Lopes	1,000	2.70
Total votes		36,993	100.00
Democratic gain from Republican			

=== 2019 Special Election ===
2019 Connecticut State Senate Election, District 6
Party	Candidate	Votes	%
Democratic	Rick Lopes	3,190	43.61
Republican	Gennaro Bizzarro	3,884	53.1
Working Families	Rick Lopes	241	3.29
Total votes		7,315	100.00
Republican gain from Democratic			

=== 2018 ===
2018 Connecticut State Senate election, District 6
Party	Candidate	Votes	%
Total	Terry Gerratana (incumbent)	17,173	62.6
Democratic	Terry Gerratana	16,087	58.6
Working Families	Terry Gerratana	1,086	4.0
Republican	Robert Smedley	10,263	37.4
Total votes		27,436	100.0
Democratic hold			

=== 2016 ===
2016 Connecticut State Senate election, District 6
Party	Candidate	Votes	%
Democratic	Terry Gerratana	19,683	64.6
Republican	Charles Paonessa	10,788	35.4
Total votes		30,471	100.0
Democratic hold			

=== 2014 ===
2014 Connecticut State Senate election, District 6
Party	Candidate	Votes	%
Democratic	Terry Gerratana	15,534	100.0
Total votes		15,534	100.0
Democratic hold			

=== 2012 ===
2012 Connecticut State Senate election, District 6
Party	Candidate	Votes	%
Democratic	Terry Gerratana	21,212	72.1
Republican	Dwight F. Blint	8,211	27.9
Total votes		30,471	100.0
Democratic hold			
