= John W. Dickinson =

American educator (1825–1901)

John Woodbridge Dickinson (October 12, 1825 – February 16, 1901) was an American educator who was principal of the Westfield Normal School from 1856 to 1877 and secretary of the Massachusetts Board of Education from 1877 to 1893.

== Early life ==
Dickinson was born on October 12, 1825. He was one of nine children born to farmer William Dickinson and was a lineal descendant of Nathaniel Dickinson. He was named after Rev. John Woodbridge, a relative by marriage. Dickinson was born in Chester, Massachusetts, but spent most of his youth in Williamstown, Massachusetts. He began working on the family farm at the age of nine, which limited his education to only a few weeks of school during the winter. He prepared for college at the Greylock Institute in Williamstown and the Williston Seminary in Easthampton, Massachusetts. He graduated from Williams College in 1852 with classical honors. In 1857, he married Alexina G. Parsons of Yarmouth, Maine.

== Career ==
After graduating, Dickinson became the assistant principal at the Westfield Normal School. In 1856, he was promoted to principal, succeeding William H. Wells. Dickinson was a proponent of Oswego Movement, which sought to teach children through the use of objects rather than through memorization.

In 1877, Dickinson was named secretary of the Massachusetts Board of Education, a position previously held by Horace Mann, Barnas Sears, George S. Boutwell, and Joseph White. During his tenure, the school district system was abolished and replaced with a town system. A law providing funding for small towns to hire school superintendents was passed and Dickinson originated a plan that would allow smaller towns to partner together to hire a joint superintendent. Also during Dickinson's time in office, four new normal school buildings were constructed and model schools were incorporated into normal school instruction. He also served as state librarian as party of his role as secretary of the board of education.

Dickinson was a member of the Williams College board of trustees from 1886 to 1890 and the Newton, Massachusetts school committee from 1888 to 1893.

Dickinson resigned as secretary on December 31, 1893, but remained involved in education, teaching courses in psychology and rhetoric at the Emerson School of Oratory. He also published two volumes of The Principals and Methods of Teaching, derived from a Knowledge of the Mind.

== Later life ==
Upon accepting the position of secretary of the Massachusetts Board of Education, Dickinson moved to Newtonville, Massachusetts. He died there on February 16, 1901. He was survived by a daughter and predeceased by a son, John W. Dickinson Jr.

Academic offices
Preceded by William H. Wells	Principal of Westfield Normal School; 1856–1877	Succeeded by Joseph G. Scott
Preceded by Joseph White	Secretary of the Massachusetts Board of Education; 1877–1893	Succeeded by Frank A. Hill
