= Erin Stewart =

Former Mayor of New Britain, Connecticut, US

40th Mayor of New Britain
- In office November 12, 2013 – November 12, 2025
- Preceded by: Tim O'Brien
- Succeeded by: Bobby Sanchez

Personal details
- Born: Erin Elizabeth Stewart; May 4, 1987 (age 39) New Britain, Connecticut, U.S.
- Party: Republican
- Education: University of Connecticut (attended); Central Connecticut State University (BA); University of New Haven (MPA)

Erin Elizabeth Stewart (born May 4, 1987) is an American politician who served as the 40th mayor of New Britain, Connecticut. Stewart is the daughter of the former Mayor of New Britain, Tim Stewart, who has served from 2003 to 2011. She was elected to her first term on November 5, 2013, at the age of 26, to become the youngest mayor in New Britain's history and the city's second female mayor. Stewart was re-elected in 2015, 2017, 2019, 2021, and 2023 for a total of 6 consecutive terms and was the longest-serving Republican Mayor in the City of New Britain's history.

In September 2024 Stewart announced she would not seek a seventh term in office in the 2025 election. In November 2025, Stewart announced her candidacy for the Republican nomination in the 2026 Connecticut gubernatorial election.

In May 2026, Stewart suspended her campaign for Governor due to allegations that while Mayor of New Britain she misused a city-issued credit card to pay for personal expenses, potentially implicating criminal statutes including fraud, larceny, embezzlement, false statements, wire fraud, and misuse of government property.

== Early career ==
Stewart's political career began as a campaign staffer for former Congresswoman Nancy Johnson. She focused on municipal political strategy and candidate outreach in Connecticut. Stewart interned in Governor Jodi Rell's administration, first in the Office of Policy and Management and later in the Legislative Affairs Office. Before becoming mayor, Stewart worked as a legislative aide in the Connecticut General Assembly. Stewart was responsible for working on constituent problems for Kevin C. Kelly's state senate district of 100,000 residents and providing research to the senator on state laws. While working at the Connecticut General Assembly, she was elected member of the city's Board of Education.

== Board of education ==
Elected to the Board of Education in November 2011, Stewart advocated for a return to neighborhood schools, greater parental engagement, and enhanced accountability measurements for teachers and administrators while keeping costs low. While Stewart served on the Board, the Board expanded Pre-K to all day programming. At that time, the Board of Education also decided to outfit the classrooms with SMART Board technology. After less than two years, Erin Stewart stepped down from the Board of Education to campaign for mayor.

== Mayor of New Britain ==
=== Elections ===
==== 2013 ====
On June 6, 2013, Stewart announced her intent to run for mayor. She was unopposed in the Republican primary. Stewart ran on a platform of government transparency and accountability while promising to restore financial health to the city in the face of a potential State takeover. On election day, Stewart beat the Democratic incumbent, Tim O'Brien, 56-44%.

==== 2015 ====
During her 2015 campaign, Stewart received endorsements from the city's police and fire unions, along with Local 1186 of the American Federation of State, County and Municipal Employees, a union consisting of more than 300 city employees. Stewart was elected to a second term on November 3, 2015, after beating both Democratic candidate John McNamara and petitioning candidate Alfred Mayo, garnering 67.13% of the vote. She became the first female elected New Britain mayor twice. For the first time in 44 years, the Common Council had a Republican supermajority, accounting for twelve of the fifteen seats on the council.

==== 2017 ====
On January 19, 2017, Stewart announced that she was seeking a third term. In her re-election campaign, Stewart stressed the importance of economic development and committed to completing the "Complete Streets Master Plan". Stewart was re-elected on November 7, 2017, by defeating Board of Education member Merrill Gay 57.5% - 42.5%, becoming the first female mayor of the city to win a third term.

==== 2019 ====
On April 14, 2019, Stewart announced that she was seeking a fourth term. On November 5, 2019, she defeated Chris Porcher and secured another term.

==== 2021 ====
On January 26, 2021, Stewart announced that she would seek a fifth term. On March 14, 2021, after speculation about a possible gubernatorial campaign, she announced that she would not be a candidate for governor in 2022. On November 2, 2021, Stewart won a historic fifth term to become the city's longest-serving Republican Mayor.

==== 2026 ====
In January 2025, Stewart announced that she had formed an exploratory committee to test her viability as a candidate for governor of Connecticut. In November 2025, she formally announced her candidacy for the Republican gubernatorial nomination in the 2026 Connecticut gubernatorial election.

In May 2026, Stewart suspended her campaign for governor of Connecticut less than an hour after the City of New Britain released a report detailing alleged private expenses charged to a city credit card. The report outlines over $200,000 in total expenses between June 2016 and November 2025.

=== Tenure ===
==== Budget and finances ====
In 2012, before Stewart became mayor, the city's auditor uncovered a $30 million budget deficit that accumulated during the time that her father, Tim Stewart, served as mayor, as he continued to take on new debt while keeping the tax rate flat. During this time, the city reported balanced budgets by relying increasingly on one-time revenues and "unrealistic" projections about income from land sales, the auditor reported. Under her immediate predecessor, Democrat Tim O'Brien, this had shrank to $19 million.

During her first few years, Erin Stewart shrank the city's deficit. By 2015, the city reduced its deficit to $4.4 million, via $16 million in spending cuts, cuts of 30 full-time jobs, and an 11 percent increase in property taxes. S&P Global Ratings deemed the city's budget that year to be structurally-balanced, and upgraded the city's bond rating from BBB to A−, a jump of three levels. S&P further upgraded the city's bond rating to an A+ in January 2016.

In 2017, the New Britain Progressive wrote that the city faced a rising municipal debt, and that Stewart's administration was restructuring its debt to create budgetary windfalls during election years in order to avoid further raising taxes while Stewart was seeking re-election. In January 2018, months after getting re-elected, Stewart called for the city to adopt a new debt plan which would lower near-term debt payments, but would result in higher payments further out, and extend the city's debt repayment timeline by multiple years.

==== Economic development ====
In 2015, after nearly three years of construction, CT Fastrak, a bus rapid transit system linking downtown New Britain with Hartford, opened. In the subsequent years, the city embraced mixed-use transit-oriented development in its downtown. While Republicans in Connecticut have broadly opposed transit-oriented development, Stewart and other New Britain officials "have embraced the CTfastrak bus rapid transit system as an economic engine", and Stewart touted CT Fastrak as "my talking point". In conjunction with this boost in downtown development, the city redesigned several streetscapes in downtown, including constructing roundabouts and bike lanes. Stewart secured over $12 million in state and federal grants to help pay for the Complete Streetscape Master Plan.

Despite some transit-oriented development downtown, New Britain's population remained relatively stagnant during Stewart's tenure, and grew by 4.21% from 2010 to 2025.

==== New Britain Bees ====
New Britain had a professional baseball team since 1983, but in June 2014, the city's longtime baseball team, the New Britain Rock Cats announced that they were moving to Hartford. After the announcement former Bridgeport Mayor Bill Finch connected Stewart with Atlantic League of Professional Baseball, the owners of the Bridgeport Bluefish. After months of negotiations, Stewart received a commitment from the league to bring what would become the New Britain Bees to the city. Due to a lapse in contracts, New Britain was without baseball for one day. In October 2019, the New Britain Bees announced it would restructure as a collegiate summer baseball team, and join the Futures Collegiate Baseball League, thus ending the city's streak of hosting a professional baseball team.

==== Homelessness ====
In 2014, Stewart's administration oversaw the rebranding and restructuring of the city's program to combat homelessness to the "Building Hope Together" program, which the city calls a "Permanent Work Plan". The January 2019 Point in Time Count found 146 people experiencing homelessness in New Britain, including 29 children. During the COVID-19 pandemic, homelessness and housing insecurity rose in New Britain, as they did throughout the state.

==== Energy efficiency ====
Through her "Smart City Initiative," Stewart spearheaded the largest solarization project in New Britain's history, including a solar array at Shuttle Meadow Reservoir, as well as rooftop solar arrays on most school buildings. In January 2016, Stewart's administration established the city's "Energy and Innovation Committee", with the stated aim of streamlining energy efficient projects in the city.

Stewart's administration approved a project to convert the disused Stanley Works industrial facility to the "New Britain Energy & Innovation Park", which included the construction of a 20-megawatt fuel cell power plant, and a plan to construct a data center. As of March 2024, Stewart's administration was still in the process of finding an operator for the planned data center.

As mayor, Stewart attended the signing of Trump's "Reinvigorating America's Beautiful Coal Industry" executive order, and met with Interior Secretary Doug Burgum to discuss energy policy.

== Connecticut gubernatorial campaign and credit card investigation ==
In May 2026, Stewart suspended her campaign for the Republican nomination for governor of Connecticut following the release of an investigative report commissioned by the City of New Britain concerning her use of a city-issued credit card while mayor.

The report, prepared by the Crumbie Law Group, alleged that a substantial portion of approximately $207,000 in charges made to Stewart's city-issued credit card from 2016 to 2025 were unrelated to municipal business, including expenses for personal items, private club charges, and political or campaign-related purposes. According to CT Mirror, New Britain Mayor Bobby Sanchez said the report would be referred to the United States Attorney and the Chief State's Attorney, and that the city would pursue recovery of taxpayer funds. WFSB reported that Connecticut State Police had initiated an investigation after receiving a complaint concerning the matter.

Stewart said she took the allegations seriously and suspended her campaign so she could address them. She stated that she intended to take accountability for any mistakes and make restitution to the City of New Britain for any amounts owed. Upon suspending her campaign, Stewart endorsed state senator Ryan Fazio for the Republican nomination.

== Political positions ==
Mayor Erin Stewart is a Republican; she is a "self-described fiscal conservative who is moderate to liberal on social issues". During her tenure as mayor, she reduced the number of city employees and moderately raised taxes. Stewart proposed a 2018 budget for New Britain that did not raise taxes and did not increase school spending.

Stewart is pro-choice on the issue of abortion and says supports gun ownership and claims she is a gun owner herself. She supports same-sex marriage.

Stewart is a proponent of coal energy. In 2025 Stewart attended the signing of an executive order "Reinvigorating America's Beautiful Coal Industry" at the White House, and touted coal as "Clean & Beautiful".

In 2025, Erin Stewart claimed to have voted for Donald J. Trump for president three times. When asked about Trump in January 2025, Stewart professed to have a similar leadership style to the president:

"We knew what we were getting when he won. We knew that everything that's happened in the last week, all the executive orders, we knew that that was going to happen, because he's the type of leader who says he's going to do something and does it. He doesn't waffle. And I'm that same type of leader."

== Awards and accolades ==
Stewart has received awards for her political service:

- 2016: Central Connecticut State University – Women of Influence Award
- 2015: Central Connecticut State University – Young Alumni Service Award
- 2015: Connecticut Coalition Against Domestic Violence honored her with "First 100 Plus"
- 2014: New Britain City Journal's "Person of the Year"
- 2014: Connecticut Magazine honorary, "Top 40 under 40"
- 2013: Women in Leadership award from the Connecticut Republican Party.
- 2007: Greater New Britain YWCA's Women in Leadership award for her work with the CT Breast Health Initiative.

Stewart has been the subject of in-depth profiles by national media outlets such as The New York Times.

== Personal life ==
Stewart was born May 4, 1987, in New Britain to Patricia (née Badolato) and Timothy Stewart. Her great uncle, Dominic J. Badolato, was first elected to the Connecticut General Assembly in 1954 and served for 22 years, and her father, Mayor Timothy Stewart, served as mayor of New Britain from 2003 to 2011.

Stewart is married to Domenic Mutone and they have two children.

=== Volunteer work ===
Stewart served as vice chairperson on the planning and budgeting subcommittee of New Britain's Commission on Community and Neighborhood Development. She is also a Justice of the Peace. Stewart has raised awareness about breast cancer due to the death of an aunt who died from the disease in 1998 at the age of 51. For the past several years, Stewart has served with Lt. Governor Nancy Wyman as the honorary co-chair of the Connecticut Race in the Park, a race held to raise funds and awareness for the Connecticut Breast Health Initiative.
