= Connecticut's 26th House of Representatives district =

American legislative district

Connecticut's 26th State House of Representatives district
Representative
David DeFronzo; D

Connecticut's 26th House of Representatives district elects one member of the Connecticut House of Representatives. It encompasses parts of New Britain. It has been represented by Democrat David DeFronzo since 2025.

== List of representatives ==
List of Representatives from Connecticut's 26th State House District
Representative	Party	Years	District home	Note
Arthur Della Vecchia	Democratic	1967–1973	Southington	Seat created
Leon F. Hermanowski	Democratic	1973–1977	New Britain	
Dominick Swieszkowski	Democratic	1977–1985	New Britain	
Stanley J. Krawiec	Democratic	1985–1995	New Britain	
Anthony Tercyak	Republican	1995–2003	New Britain	Died in office
Peter Tercyak	Democratic	2003–2025	New Britain	Elected in special election
David DeFronzo	Democratic	2025–	New Britain	

== Recent elections ==
=== 2020 ===
2020 Connecticut State House of Representatives election, District 26
Party	Candidate	Votes	%
Democratic	Peter Tercyak (incumbent)	4,650	61.10
Republican	Piotr S. Ceglarz	2,420	31.80
Libertarian	Jonathan Milon Johnson	291	3.82
Working Families	Peter Tercyak (incumbent)	250	3.28
Total votes		7,611	100.00
Democratic hold			

=== 2018 ===
2018 Connecticut House of Representatives election, District 26
Party	Candidate	Votes	%
Democratic	Peter Tercyak (Incumbent)	3,698	69.8
Republican	Tremell Collins	1,601	30.2
Total votes		5,299	100.00
Democratic hold			

=== 2016 ===
2016 Connecticut House of Representatives election, District 26
Party	Candidate	Votes	%
Democratic	Peter Tercyak (Incumbent)	4,654	72.28
Republican	Desiree Agosto	1,785	27.72
Total votes		6,439	100.00
Democratic hold			

=== 2014 ===
2014 Connecticut House of Representatives election, District 26
Party	Candidate	Votes	%
Democratic	Peter Tercyak (Incumbent)	2,301	55.3
Republican	Piotr S. Ceglarz	1,494	35.9
Independent Party	Piotr S. Ceglarz	187	4.5
Working Families	Peter Tercyak (Incumbent)	179	4.3
Total votes		4,161	100.00
Democratic hold			

=== 2012 ===
2012 Connecticut House of Representatives election, District 26
Party	Candidate	Votes	%
Democratic	Peter Tercyak (Incumbent)	4,044	67.5
Republican	Daniel Davis	1,660	27.7
Independent Party	David P. Kramer	291	4.9
Total votes		5,995	100.00
Democratic hold			
