= Mayor of New Britain, Connecticut =

Political office in the United States

Mayor of New Britain
- Incumbent; Bobby Sanchez since November 12, 2025

The mayor of New Britain, Connecticut, is the city's chief executive.

== List of mayors ==
Term start	Mayor	Notes	Political party	Term end
1871	Frederick Trent Stanley	Industrialist; warden of the borough in 1850.	Republican	1872
1872	Samuel Waldo Hart	(1825–1891). A New Britain native, Hart attended Berkshire Medical College, Harvard, and Yale. His successful practice in New Britain led to his election as the second mayor (1872–1877). He held the office for five consecutive years.	Republican	1877
1877	David Nelson Camp	(1820–1916)	Republican	1879
1879	Ambrose Beatty	(1831–1900). Born in Clughil, County Longford, Ireland, Beatty came to New Britain in 1856. He worked for Russell & Erwin and later in the grocery business.	Democratic	1880
1880	John Butler Talcott		Republican	1882
1882	Ambrose Beatty		Democratic	1883
1883	James Andrew Pickett	(1829–1900). Industrialist and son of Albert Pickett; born March 9, 1829, in New Milford, Litchfield County. Pickett came to New Britain in 1851 and began as an employee of Alvin North. He and Loren F. Judd purchased a half-interest in the establishment, which became North & Judd.	Republican	1886
1886	Ambrose Beatty		Democratic	1887
1887	J. Clement Atwood	Born in East Boston. Aged 56 at time of service. For many years vestryman and warden of St. Mark's parish, New Britain.	Republican	1888
1888	John Walsh		Democratic	1890
1890	Leumas Hoyt Pease	(1845–1919). Born January 20. Treasurer of the Stanley Works. Died at his home in New Britain after a brief illness from heart trouble.	Republican	1892
1892	John Walsh		Democratic	1894
1894	George Waldo Corbin	Founder of Corbin Cabinet Lock.	Democratic	1896
1896	Robert J. Vance		Democratic	1898
1898	Morris C. Webster	Born in Harwinton, Connecticut, on September 28, 1848. Served as Connecticut State Comptroller (1915–1921).	Republican	1900
1900	Samuel Bassett		Democratic	1903
1906	George M. Landers		Republican	1910
1910	Joseph M. Halloran	At the age of 30, he became the 15th mayor (1910–1914).	Democratic	1914
1914	George Arthur Quigley	(1880–1953). Born in New Britain on October 9, 1880; son of Thomas Joseph and Caroline Louise Partridge.	Republican	1920
1920	Orson Fowler Curtis	(1852–1936). A carpenter and contractor. It took Curtis six tries to become mayor before achieving the goal (1920–1922).	Republican	1922
1922	Angelo Michael Alfred Paonessa	(1878–1949)	Democratic	1926
1926	Gardner Clarke Weld	Known as "the Herald Mayor". On December 27, he dismissed Police Commissioner Peter Pajewski. The "Pajewski affair" belongs to the abundant folklore of New Britain politics; Pajewski was a member of the Polish American Republican Club and owned a drugstore on Broad and Grove Streets.	Republican	1928
1928	Angelo Michael Alfred Paonessa		Democratic	1930
1930	George Arthur Quigley		Republican	1934
1934	David L. Dunn		Democratic	1936
1936	George Arthur Quigley		Republican	1938
1938	George James Coyle		Democratic	1942
1942	George Arthur Quigley		Republican	1946
1947	Henry John Gwiazda	(1910 – February 5, 2000). First Polish American elected mayor of New Britain.	Democratic	1949
1950	John L. Sullivan	(1916 – March 4, 1998)	Democratic	1954
1954	Edward B. Scott	(Born 1913, Manchester, New Hampshire). Educated at Princeton University (A.B. 1935) and Harvard University (LL.B. 1938). Admitted to practice in Connecticut (1938) and Pennsylvania (1939). A Navy veteran of World War II, Scott was elected mayor for a two-year term by a majority of 2,945 votes.	Republican	1955
1956	Joseph Francis Morelli	(1916 – May 30, 1996). Appointed to the Circuit Court in 1969 and elevated to the Superior Court in 1978. He retired in 1986 at the age of seventy.	Democratic	1960
1960	Julius J. Kremski		Democratic	1962
1962	Thomas Joseph Meskill		Republican	1964
1964	James F. Dawson	An attorney for the state tax department, Dawson also served as legal counsel for the City Improvement Commission. He was responsible for the expansion of the city.	Democratic	1965
1965	Paul John Manafort Sr.	Father of consultant and lobbyist Paul Manafort (one-time campaign chair for Donald Trump).	Republican	1971
1971	Algert F. Politis	(1923–2013)	Republican	1971
1971	Stanley Joseph Pac	Born July 2, 1923, in New Britain.	Democratic	1975
1975	James J. Carey	(1923–2009)	Democratic	1975
1975	William J. McNamara	(born 1935)	Democratic	1989
1989	Donald DeFronzo		Democratic	1993
1993	Linda A. Blogoslawski Mlynarczyk	(January 11, 1960 – March 6, 1998). First woman elected mayor of New Britain. She defeated Democrat Pawlak by 100 votes in the 1993 election to become the first Republican mayor in 22 years.	Republican	1995
1995	Lucian J. Pawlak		Democratic	2003
2003	Timothy T. Stewart	Born September 30, 1952.	Republican	2011
2011	Tim O'Brien		Democratic	2013
November 12, 2013	Erin Stewart	Youngest mayor in city's history. First female mayor to be re-elected.	Republican	November 12, 2025
November 12, 2025	Bobby Sanchez	First Latino mayor in city's history.	Democratic	
