= Alpheus Crosby =

American classicist (1810–1874)

- Born: 13 October 1810; Sandwich, New Hampshire
- Died: 17 April 1874 (aged 63); Salem, Massachusetts
- Occupations: Classicist, author
- Spouse(s): Abigail Grant Jones Cutler (m. 1834) Martha Kingman (m. 1861)

Academic background
- Education: Dartmouth University (BA)

Alpheus Crosby (1810–1874) was an American classicist, scholar and author.

Crosby was born on October 13, 1810, in Sandwich, New Hampshire, to Asa Crosby and Abigail Russell Crosby. He entered Dartmouth College at age 13, then received a Bachelor of Arts in either 1817 or 1827, after which he studied theology at Andover Theological Seminary in the 1830s.

In April 1833, Crosby became Professor of the Latin and Greek Languages and Literature at Dartmouth College. In 1857, he became the principal of the Massachusetts State Normal School.

Crosby married Abigail Grant Jones Cutler on August 27, 1834, then Martha Kingman on February 12, 1861.

He died April 17, 1874, in Salem, Massachusetts.

== Bibliography ==
He is the author or translator of a number of books:

- A Grammar of the Greek Language
- A Lexicon to Xenophon's Anabasis
- Greek Tables for the Use of Students
- First Lessons in Geometry Upon the Model of Colburn's First Lessons in Arithmetic

== See also ==
- Anabasis (Xenophon)
