= Normal schools in the United States =

Normal schools in the United States in the 19th century were developed and built primarily to train elementary-level teachers for the public schools. The term “normal school” is based on the French école normale, a sixteenth-century model school with model classrooms where model teaching practices were taught to teacher candidates. Many high schools in the 19th century had one-year "normal school" programs to train teachers for common schools, In the early 20th century the normal schools all became state colleges. More recently most have become state universities with a wide range of programs beyond just training teachers.

== History ==
The former normal schools that survive in the 21st century have become state universities. Before 1860, "common schools" were elementary schools, and many high schools provided a year or two of instruction to young women as part of preparation for teaching in the common schools. New England—especially Massachusetts—was the center for educational innovation.

=== New England ===
1823 – Columbian School in Concord, Vermont

In 1823, Reverend Samuel Read Hall founded the first private normal school in the United States, the Columbian School in Concord, Vermont. Influenced by similar academies in Prussia and elsewhere in Europe, American normal schools were intended to improve the quality of the burgeoning common school system by producing more qualified teachers. Hall also founded the first private normal schools in Massachusetts and New Hampshire. His original school was renamed Concord Academy before closing after seven years.

1839 – Lexington Normal School, Lexington, Massachusetts

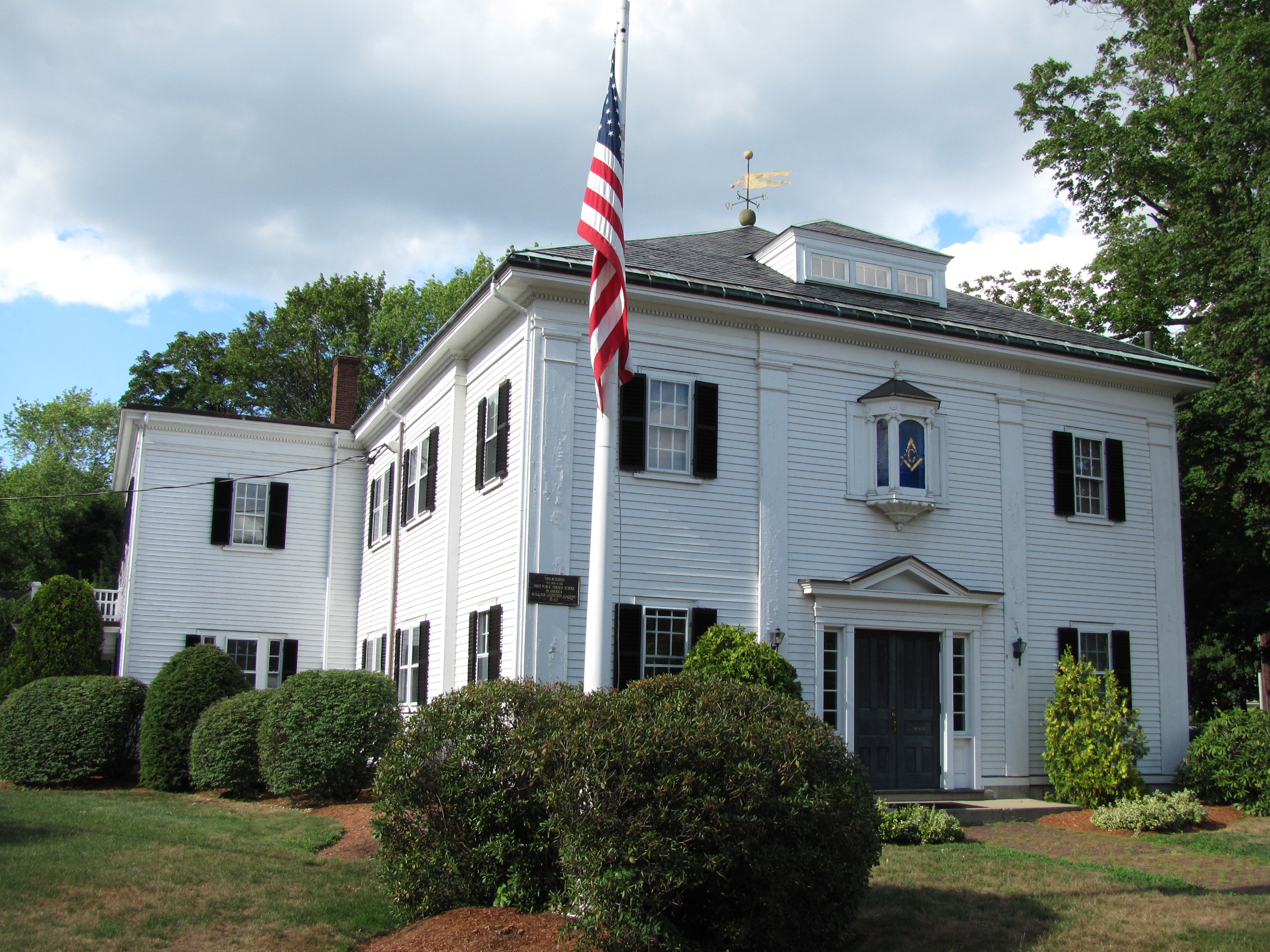
Site of the first public normal school in the United States, in Lexington, Massachusetts. This institution went on to become Framingham State University.

Massachusetts took the lead among state governments, thanks to a grant of $10,000 from a Boston philanthropist and a vigorous campaign led by James G. Carter and Horace Mann. The legislature in 1838 provided for normal schools in the towns of Lexington, Bare and Bridgewater. The first state-sponsored normal school opened in 1839 in Lexington. The goal was to provide training in how to teach children in the ungraded common schools. The new curriculum included an in-depth review of the usual subjects; a review of the physical, mental and moral psychological development; the general principles and methods of teaching; and covered daily plans, discipline; and practice teaching. In 1844 that school moved from its original site of Lexington to West Newton, and then in 1853 to Framingham. Today, Framingham State University is recognized as the oldest continuously operated public normal school in the United States. Anna Brackett attended this school and in 1863 became the first woman principal of a teachers' college.

1849 – State Normal School, New Britain, Connecticut

In 1849, the Connecticut General Assembly established a State Normal School, a training school for teachers. In 1850, a new building to house the Normal School was built in New Britain. In 1933, the school became the Teachers College of Connecticut and in 1959 it became Central Connecticut State College, and finally in 1983 renamed Central Connecticut State University. CCSU is the oldest publicly funded higher education institution in Connecticut.

1854 – Rhode Island State Normal School, Bristol, Rhode Island

Rhode Island State Normal School was established by the Rhode Island General Assembly in 1854. Its creation can be attributed to Henry Barnard, the first state agent for education in Rhode Island who had established the Rhode Island Teachers Institute at Smithville Seminary in 1845, and his successor, Elisha R. Potter.

With the dedication of a new building in 1898, the institution began a period of steady growth, evolving first into a teachers' college, the Rhode Island College of Education. In the 1958–59 academic year the college moved to its current Mount Pleasant campus, and in 1959 was renamed Rhode Island College to reflect its new purpose as a comprehensive institution of higher education. With an enrollment predominantly from Rhode Island and nearby Massachusetts and Connecticut, the institution historically has served as a "College of Opportunity" for first-generation college students.

1854 – Salem Normal School, Salem, Massachusetts

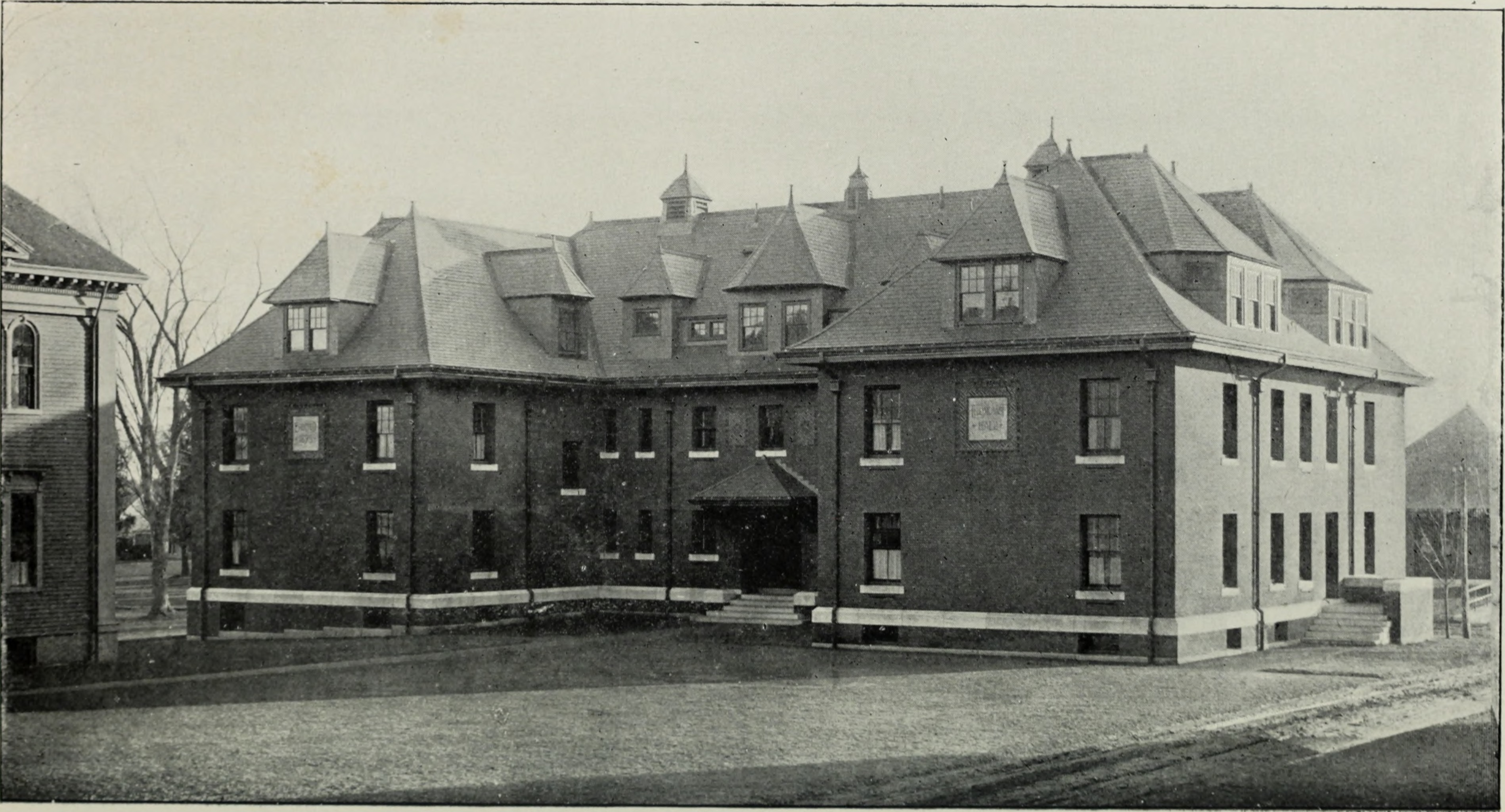
State Normal School, Bridgewater MA (1896), today Bridgewater State University

Salem Normal School, now Salem State University, was founded in 1854 as the fourth Normal School in Massachusetts. In 1853, the General Court authorized the founding of a normal school in Essex County. Proposals were received from Salem, Chelsea, Groveland, and North Andover. Salem was selected due to many factors including the city's historical and commercial significance and need for local teacher education.

Prior to the founding of the normal school, Salem women had few opportunities to receive teacher training and the Salem school system was replete with funding, attendance, and teacher compensation problems. It was assumed that by training women as teachers, they could be hired at a lower salary than male teachers, thus alleviating the city's public school budget and teacher compensation challenges.

The original location was at the corner of Broad and Summer Streets, with the building's dedication held on September 14, 1854. Richard Edwards, a graduate of Bridgewater Normal School (now Bridgewater State University), was the first president of Salem Normal School.

1864 – Farmington State Normal School, Farmington, Maine

Established in 1864, Farmington State Normal School was the first public establishment of higher education in the state of Maine. In 1945, the school was renamed "Farmington State Teachers College". The Farmington State Teachers College was acquired by the University of Maine system in 1968 and is today the University of Maine at Farmington.

=== Northeast ===
1834 - St. Lawrence Academy, Potsdam, New York

A private institution founded in 1816, it created a teaching department in 1834. It received state funding to offer the Potsdam Normal school, which evolved into SUNY Potsdam.

1855 – Millersville Normal School, Millersville, Pennsylvania

Millersville Normal School was founded in 1855 as the first normal school in Pennsylvania. Over the years it has changed its name a number of times eventually becoming Millersville University of Pennsylvania.

1855 – The Paterson City Normal School, Paterson, New Jersey

A land grant institution founded as the Paterson City Normal School in the industrial city of Paterson, NJ to train teachers for NJ schools. In 1951, the school moved to the present campus in Wayne, NJ which was purchased by the State in 1948 from the family of Garret Hobart, twenty-fourth vice president of the United States and renamed Paterson State Teachers College. In 1971, it was renamed William Paterson College of New Jersey in honor of William Paterson (judge), a United States Supreme Court Justice appointed by President George Washington, after the legislative mandate to move from a teachers' college to a broad-based liberal arts institution. The New Jersey Commission on Higher Education granted William Paterson university status in June 1997 and it is now known as The William Paterson University of New Jersey (WPUNJ). The second oldest public university in the state; Rutgers (public) and Princeton (private) being older and pre-colonial.

1855 – New Jersey State Normal School, Trenton, New Jersey

Founded in 1855, the college was located in Trenton until 1928, when it moved to Ewing Township, where four-year baccalaureate degrees began to be offered. The college exists today as The College of New Jersey (TCNJ).

1855 - Newark Normal School; Newark, New Jersey

Founded in 1855, the college was located in Newark until 1958 when it moved to Union, New Jersey. Known as Newark Normal School from 1855 to 1913; subsequently named New Jersey State Normal School at Newark 1913–1937; New Jersey State Teachers College 1937–1959; Newark State College 1959–1973; Kean College of New Jersey 1973–1997. The college exists today at Kean University

1861 – Oswego Primary Teachers School, Oswego, New York

Established as Oswego Normal School, the Oswego State Normal School was founded by Edward Austin Sheldon, and recognized as a state school in 1866 by New York State becoming the Oswego State Normal and Training School. The school was part of the training program Sheldon devised to introduce the Pestalozzi method of education to the schools of the city of Oswego, the first time the method had ever been used in the United States. The "Oswego Movement" was highly influential nationwide. Sheldon's school became Oswego State Teachers College in 1942, and was upgraded again to a liberal arts college in 1962, becoming known as Oswego State University (now The State University of New York at Oswego).

1865 – Baltimore Normal School for Colored Teachers, Baltimore, Maryland

Established in 1865 by the Baltimore Association for the Moral and Educational Improvement of the Colored People, School #1 opened on January 9, 1865, in the African Baptist Church in Crane's Building on the corner of Calvert and Saratoga streets. In 1867, with the aid of the Freedmen's Bureau, the Quakers of England and others, the Baltimore Association purchased and renovated the Old Friends Meeting House at the corner of Saratoga and Courtland streets to house the Baltimore Normal School for Colored Teachers. The school moved to Bowie, MD in 1911, changing its name to the Maryland Normal and Industrial School at Bowie in 1914. Today, this school exists as Bowie State University.

1866 – Keystone State Normal School, Kutztown, Pennsylvania

On September 15, 1866, the Keystone State Normal School was established on what is now the site of Kutztown University's Old Main. The needs of a burgeoning industrialization in the region placed more and more demands on teacher preparation, and in 1928, the institution was designated Kutztown State Teacher's College (now Kutztown University) and authorized to confer the bachelor's degree.

1866 – Maryland State Normal School, Baltimore, Maryland

While the state created the Maryland State Normal School in the state constitution of 1864, MSNS would not open its doors in Baltimore until January 15, 1865. The school was moved to Towson, Maryland in 1915. In 1935, it was renamed the State Teachers College at Towson, and by 1963 it was changed to a liberal arts school and was renamed Towson State College. In 1976 it was renamed Towson State University and by 1997 it was Towson University.

1871 – Normal School, Buffalo, New York

Buffalo State was founded in 1871 as the Buffalo Normal School before becoming the State Normal and Training School (1888–1927), the State Teachers College at Buffalo (1928–1946), the New York State College for Teachers at Buffalo (1946–1950), SUNY, New York State College for Teachers (1950–1951), the State University College for Teachers at Buffalo (1951–1959), the State University College of Education at Buffalo (1960–1961), and finally the State University College at Buffalo in 1961.

1908 - New Jersey State Normal School at Montclair, Montclair, New Jersey

Founded as New Jersey State Normal School at Montclair 1908–1927; subsequently named Montclair State Teachers College (1927–1958). Montclair State Teachers College merged with the Panzer College of Physical Education and Hygiene (1928–1958; previously Newark Normal School of Physical Education and Hygiene, 1917–1928) and renamed Montclair State College (1958–1994) before adopting its current name, Montclair State University.

1923 - Glassboro Normal School, Glassboro, New Jersey

Founded as Glassboro Normal School 1923; subsequently named Glassboro State College (1958–1992) and Rowan College of New Jersey (1992–1997) before adopting its current name, Rowan University.

1927 - New Jersey State Normal School at Jersey City, Jersey City, New Jersey

Founded as New Jersey State Normal School at Jersey City in 1927–1935; subsequently named New Jersey State Teachers College at Jersey City (1935–1958) and Jersey City State College (1958–1998). The college exists today as New Jersey City University (NJCU).

=== Midwest ===
1853 – Michigan State Normal School, Ypsilanti, Michigan

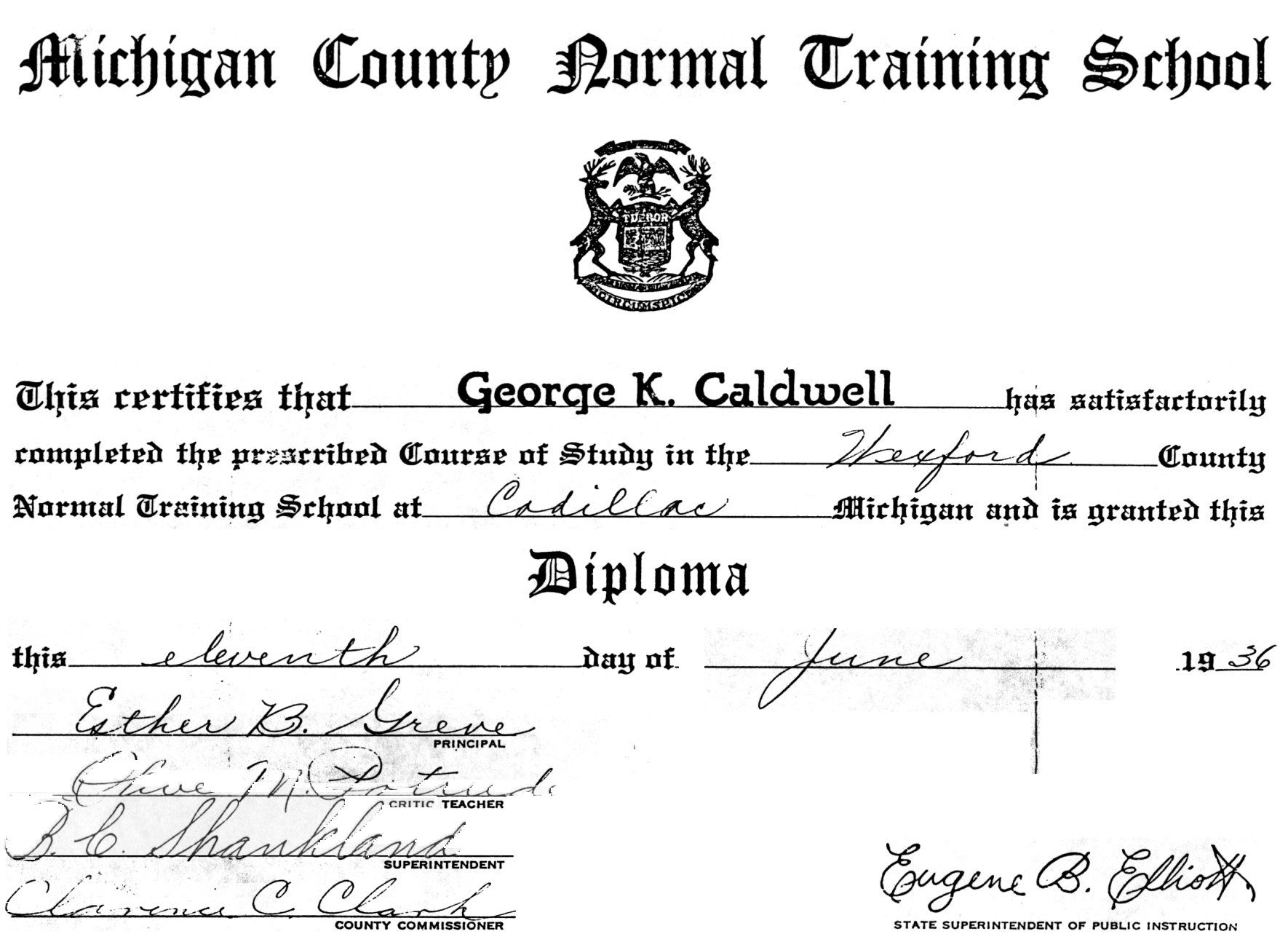
Diploma from a normal school in the U.S.

The first normal school west of the Appalachian Mountains in the United States was the Michigan State Normal School, now Eastern Michigan University. It was created by legislative action in 1849 and opened in Ypsilanti, Michigan, in 1853.

1857 – Illinois State Normal University, Normal, Illinois

The State of Illinois passed an act to establish a normal school on 18 February 1857, and proposals were submitted to locate the new school in Batavia, Bloomington, Peoria, and Washington (in Tazewell County). Bids were opened by the State Board of Education in Peoria on 7 May 1857 and the offer from Bloomington, Illinois, was accepted. The normal school was located near the village of North Bloomington, which later was renamed Normal in honor of the school. The school, originally known as Illinois State Normal University (ISNU), and also known as the Illinois State Teachers College, is now known as Illinois State University.

1857 – Harris Teachers College, St. Louis, Missouri

Harris–Stowe State University, now a state university in Missouri, was founded by the St. Louis public school system in 1857 and claims to be the oldest normal school west of the Mississippi River.

The modern university is the result of the merger of the two normal schools in the area, Harris Teachers College, the older of the two institutions and segregated for white people only, and Stowe Teachers' College, which was segregated for black people only, following the Brown vs. BOE decision in 1954.

1858 – Winona State Normal School, Winona, Minnesota

The first state-authorized normal college to open west of the Mississippi River was Winona State Normal School, now called Winona State University, which opened in 1858. Its creation was one of the first acts of the newly formed Minnesota Legislature.

1863 – Kansas State Normal Schools, Kansas

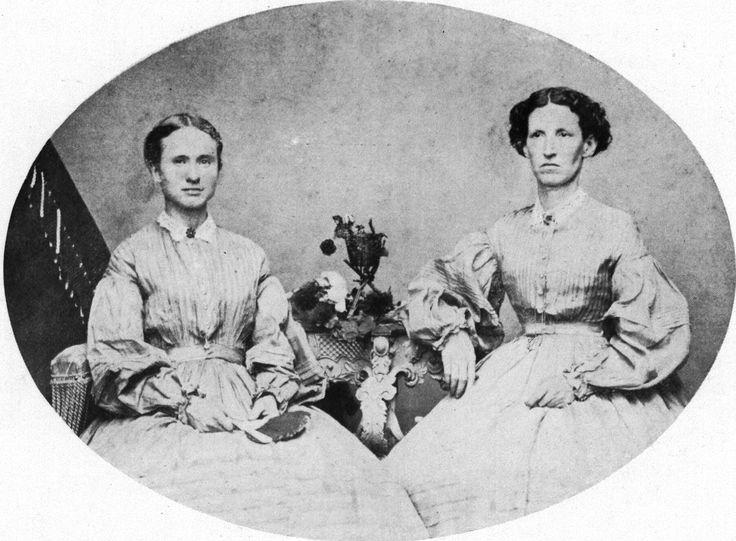
First graduating class at the Kansas State Normal School, 1867

In 1863, the Kansas Legislature passed an act to establish the Kansas State Normal Schools, starting with the first in Emporia, Kansas, which eventually became Emporia State University Teachers College. From 1870 through 1876, Leavenworth Normal School operated in Leavenworth, Kansas, and from 1874 through 1876 Concordia Normal School operated in Concordia, Kansas, but the "miscellaneous appropriations bill of 1876" caused Leavenworth and Concordia to close and consolidated operations at the Emporia location. Other normal schools were opened in Kansas including in 1902 the Western Branch of the Kansas Normal in Hays, Kansas, eventually becoming Fort Hays State University. In 1904, a branch in Pittsburg, Kansas, was opened as the Manual Training Auxiliary School, which eventually became Pittsburg State University.

Indiana — 1865, Indiana State Normal School

The Indiana General Assembly established the Indiana State Normal School in Terre Haute on December 20, 1865. Its location in Terre Haute was secured by a donation of $73,000 by Chauncey Rose. As the State Normal School, its core mission was to educate elementary and high school teachers. The school awarded its first baccalaureate degrees in 1908 and the first master's degrees in 1928.

In 1929, the Indiana State Normal School was renamed as the Indiana State Teachers College and in 1961 it was renamed Indiana State College due to an expanding mission. In 1965, the Indiana General Assembly renamed the college as Indiana State University (ISU) in recognition of increasing student population and expansion of degrees offered. Former NBA player Larry Bird is a graduate of ISU, although many people mistakenly believe he went to Indiana University (IU)(in Bloomington). Indiana University - Bloomington is approximately 52 miles south and east of ISU.

1866 – Platteville Normal School, Platteville, Wisconsin

1867 – Nebraska State Normal School, Peru, Nebraska

Nebraska State Normal School was chartered on June 20, 1867. The action by the Nebraska legislature made it the first state-supported college in Nebraska with the first classes held on October 24, 1867. The name changed to Nebraska State Teachers College at Peru in 1921, and in 1949 it changed to Peru State Teachers College. The current name of Peru State College was adopted in 1963.

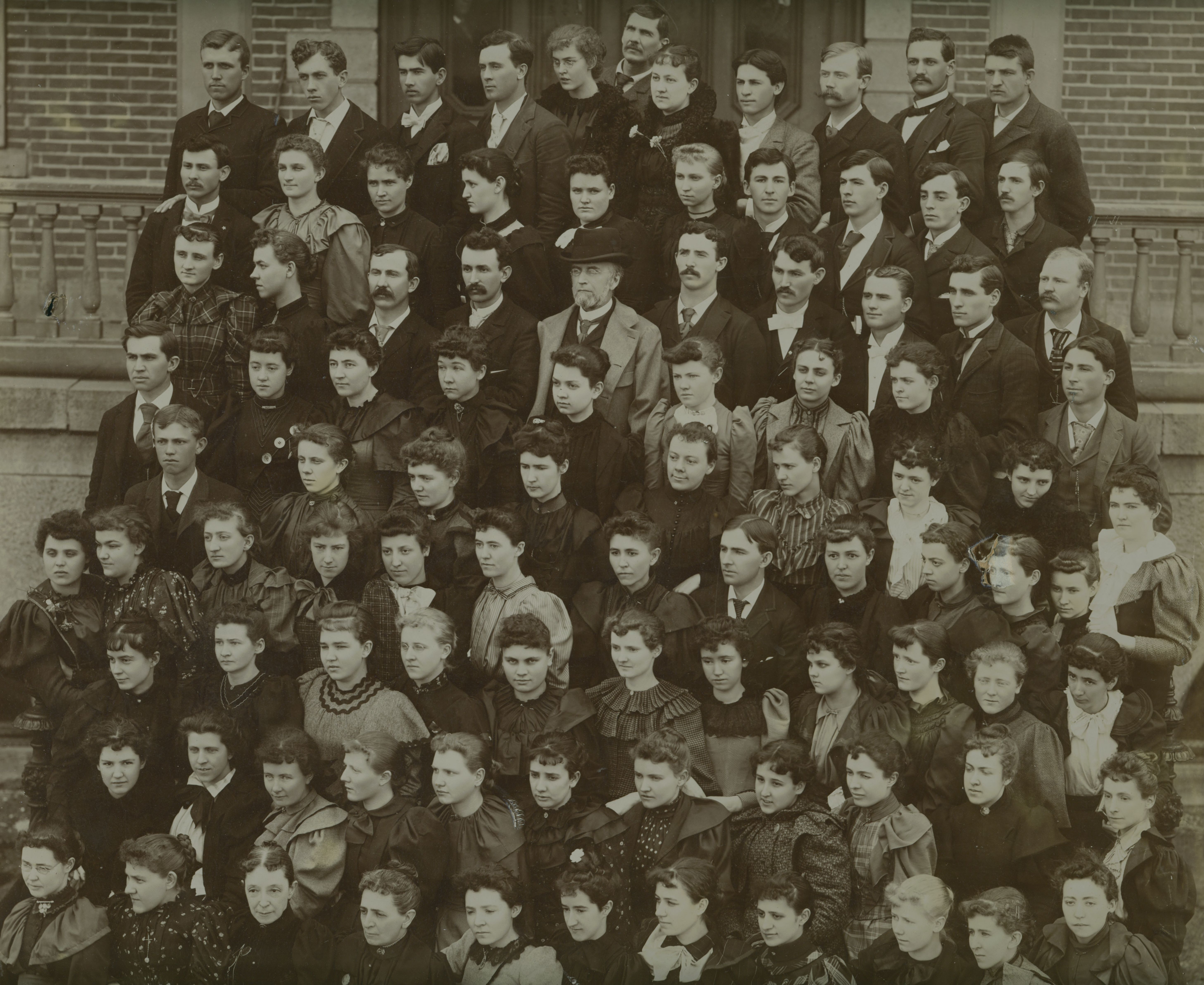
Class of 1894 at Mankato State Normal School, Mankato, Minnesota. Minnesota State University, Mankato collection.

1868 – Mankato Normal School, Mankato, Minnesota Mankato Normal School was the second normal school in Minnesota. Students were usually 17–19 years old when they entered. The student body, which peaked at about 900 in 1920–21, was approximately three-fourths female. In 1921 the school evolved into Minnesota State University, Mankato.

1869 – Third State Normal School, St. Cloud, Minnesota

Located in St. Cloud, the Third State Normal School was the third normal school established in Minnesota. It welcomed 50 students (40 women and 10 men) as well as 70 children for the model school. Ira Moore was the school's first principal (later president). It graduated its first class, numbering 15, in June 1871. It trained mostly teachers through the end of World War II and then branched out into other disciplines. It is today's St. Cloud State University.

1876 – Iowa State Normal School, Cedar Falls, Iowa

Opened as Iowa State Normal School in 1876, the school took over the facilities that the state of Iowa originally built to be home to orphans of its Civil War Veterans. The school changed to Iowa State Teachers College in 1909, then State College of Iowa in 1961 before becoming the University of Northern Iowa in 1967.

1888 – Moorhead Normal School, Moorhead, Minnesota

Minnesota State Senator Solomon Comstock introduced a bill to the Minnesota State Legislature in 1885, declaring "...[a normal school] would be a fine thing for the Red River Country and especially for Moorhead." Comstock then donated six acres of land and the next session of the Legislature appropriated $60,000 for the construction of Main Hall, which included classrooms, administrative offices and a library. When The Moorhead Normal School opened in the fall of 1888, President Livingston Lord presided over five faculty members and a class of 29 students. As the school expanded over the years, it went through several name changes, eventually becoming Minnesota State University Moorhead in 2000.

1892 - Central Michigan Normal School and Business Institute, Mt. Pleasant, Michigan

Founded as a private normal school to address the lack of formal training in the "norms" of teaching. After the Michigan State Board of Education took over governance of the school it became a state institution and was renamed Central State Normal School in 1895. The institution became a full university and gained its current name Central Michigan University in 1959 under the university's 6th president Judson W. Foust.

1894 – Springfield Normal School, Springfield, Missouri

The Springfield Normal School was founded in 1894 in Springfield, Missouri, to train teachers for public schools in southwest Missouri. This private school offered a Masters of Pedagogy as a two-year post high school degree. Students also participated in a variety of extra curricular activities. Enrollment was as high as 700 students.

In 1906, the private school merged with the new state normal school becoming the Fourth District Normal School. The school moved to its current site with the completion of the building now called Carrington Hall in 1909. The school has evolved into a research university and is now Missouri State University.

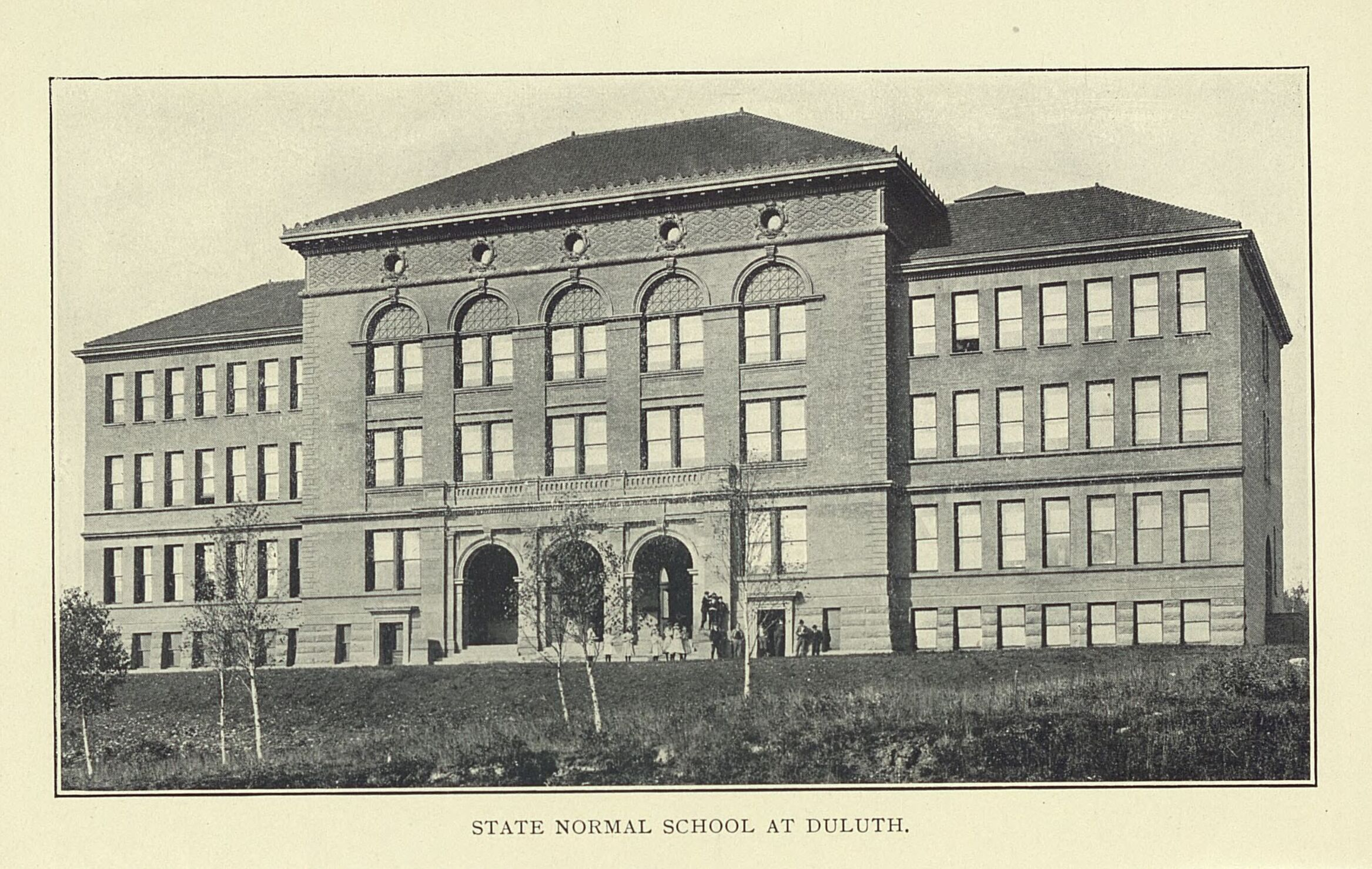
Duluth Normal School, 1902-1903

1895 – Duluth Normal School, Duluth, Minnesota

The Minnesota State Legislature passed a bill authorizing the State Normal School at Duluth in 1895. The first building, Old Main, opened in 1902 and its first students graduated with teaching degrees in 1903. The Normal School operated a Model School for children in Duluth where students could practice teaching. It became the Duluth State Teacher's College in 1921 and the Duluth Branch of the University of Minnesota in 1947. The school is now University of Minnesota Duluth.

1899 – Ellendale State Normal and Industrial School

This was one of the schools of higher learning provided for in North Dakota's 1889 constitution. Courses included American citizenship, cooking, woodworking, physical education, and others that together were offered as "a living symbol of democracy".

==== Ohio ====
In 1871, the Northwestern Ohio Normal School, which later became Ohio Northern University, was founded in Ada, Ohio. The Lowry Normal School Bill of 1910 authorized two new normal schools in Ohio—one in the northwestern part of the state (now Bowling Green State University) and another in the northeastern part (now Kent State University).

=== West ===
California — 1857, California State Normal School

After a private normal school closed in San Francisco after only one year, politicians John Swett and Henry B. Janes sought to establish a normal school for San Francisco's public school system, and approached George W. Minns to be the principal for the nascent institution, with Swett as an assistant principal. The normal school began operations in 1857 and became known as the Minns Evening Normal School. In 1861, after the continued success of the Evening School, superintendent Andrew J. Moulder requested that a committee be formed to create a report on the merits of fully funding a state normal school. Minns Evening Normal School became the California State Normal School in 1862, and is today San Jose State University.

Montana - 1893, State Normal School

In 1889, the Act of Congress under which the State of Montana was admitted to the Union set aside acres of the public domain for the establishment and support of normal schools. As a result of this Act, Dillon was selected as the site for the State Normal School in 1893, making its teacher education program the oldest in the state. (The campus sits on the ancestral homeland and traditional territory of many Indigenous Nations, including the Apsáalooke (Crow), Niimiipuu (Nez Perce), Shoshone, Bannock, Niitsitapi (Blackfeet), Séliš (Salish), and others. The institution recognizes and honors the sovereignty of the Indigenous Nations geographically overlapping Montana and is mindful of the impacts of colonization on traditional tribal homelands.) In 1893 the institution was established as the State Normal School. In 1903, the institution became the State Normal College. In 1931 the institution established a Baccalaureate degree in education. In 1949, the name changed to Western Montana College of Education. In 1965 the name changed to Western Montana College. In 1968 the name changed to Western Montana College of The University of Montana. In 2001, the name changed to the University of Montana Western, In 2013, Montana Western transitioned to the Experience One baccalaureate making it the only public university in the United States offering Experience One, where students take one course at a time for 18 days, then take a short break, and then move on to another course.

== Other normal schools ==
1855 – New Jersey State Normal School, Trenton, New Jersey

Founded in 1855, the college was located in Trenton until 1928, when it moved to Ewing Township, where four year baccalaureate degrees began to be offered. The college exists today as The College of New Jersey.

1861 – Oswego Primary Teachers School, Oswego, New York

Established as Oswego Normal School, the Oswego State Normal School was founded by Edward Austin Sheldon, and recognized as a state school in 1866 by New York State becoming the Oswego State Normal and Training School. The school was part of the training program Sheldon devised to introduce the Pestalozzi method of education to the schools of the city of Oswego, the first time the method had ever been used in the United States. Sheldon's school became Oswego State Teachers College in 1942, and was upgraded again to a liberal arts college in 1962, becoming known as Oswego State University.

1865 – Baltimore Normal School for Colored Teachers, Baltimore, Maryland

Established in 1865 by the Baltimore Association for the Moral and Educational Improvement of the Colored People, School #1 opened on January 9, 1865, in the African Baptist Church in Crane's Building on the corner of Calvert and Saratoga streets. In 1867, with the aid of the Freedmen's Bureau, the Quakers of England and others, the Baltimore Association purchased and renovated the Old Friends Meeting House at the corner of Saratoga and Courtland streets to house the Baltimore Normal School for Colored Teachers. The school moved to Bowie, MD in 1911, changing its name to the Maryland Normal and Industrial School at Bowie in 1914. Today, this school exists as Bowie State University.

1866 – Keystone State Normal School, Kutztown, Pennsylvania

On September 15, 1866, the Keystone State Normal School was established on what is now the site of Kutztown University's Old Main. The needs of a burgeoning industrialization in the region placed more and more demands on teacher preparation, and in 1928, the institution was designated Kutztown State Teacher's College and authorized to confer the bachelor's degree.

1866 – Maryland State Normal School, Baltimore, Maryland

While the state created the Maryland State Normal School in the state constitution of 1864, MSNS would not open its doors in Baltimore until January 15, 1865. The school was moved to Towson, Maryland in 1915. In 1935, it was renamed the State Teachers College at Towson, and by 1963 it was changed to a liberal arts school and was renamed Towson State College. In 1976 it was renamed Towson State University and by 1997 it was Towson University.

1871 – Normal School, Buffalo, New York

Buffalo State was founded in 1871 as the Buffalo Normal School before becoming the State Normal and Training School (1888–1927), the State Teachers College at Buffalo (1928–1946), the New York State College for Teachers at Buffalo (1946–1950), SUNY, New York State College for Teachers (1950–1951), the State University College for Teachers at Buffalo (1951–1959), the State University College of Education at Buffalo (1960–1961), and finally the State University College at Buffalo in 1961.

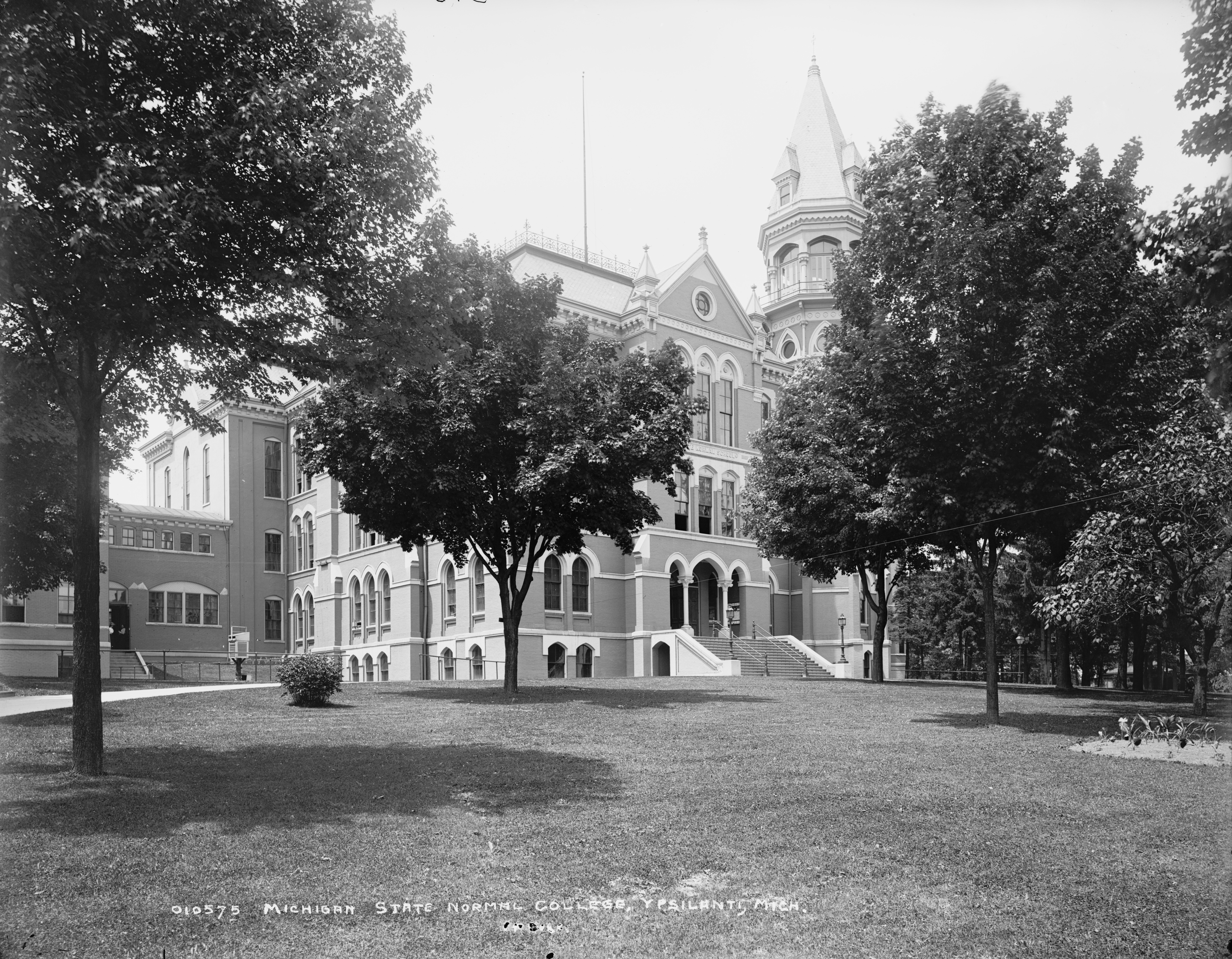
Michigan State Normal School

=== Midwest ===
1853 – Michigan State Normal School, Ypsilanti, Michigan

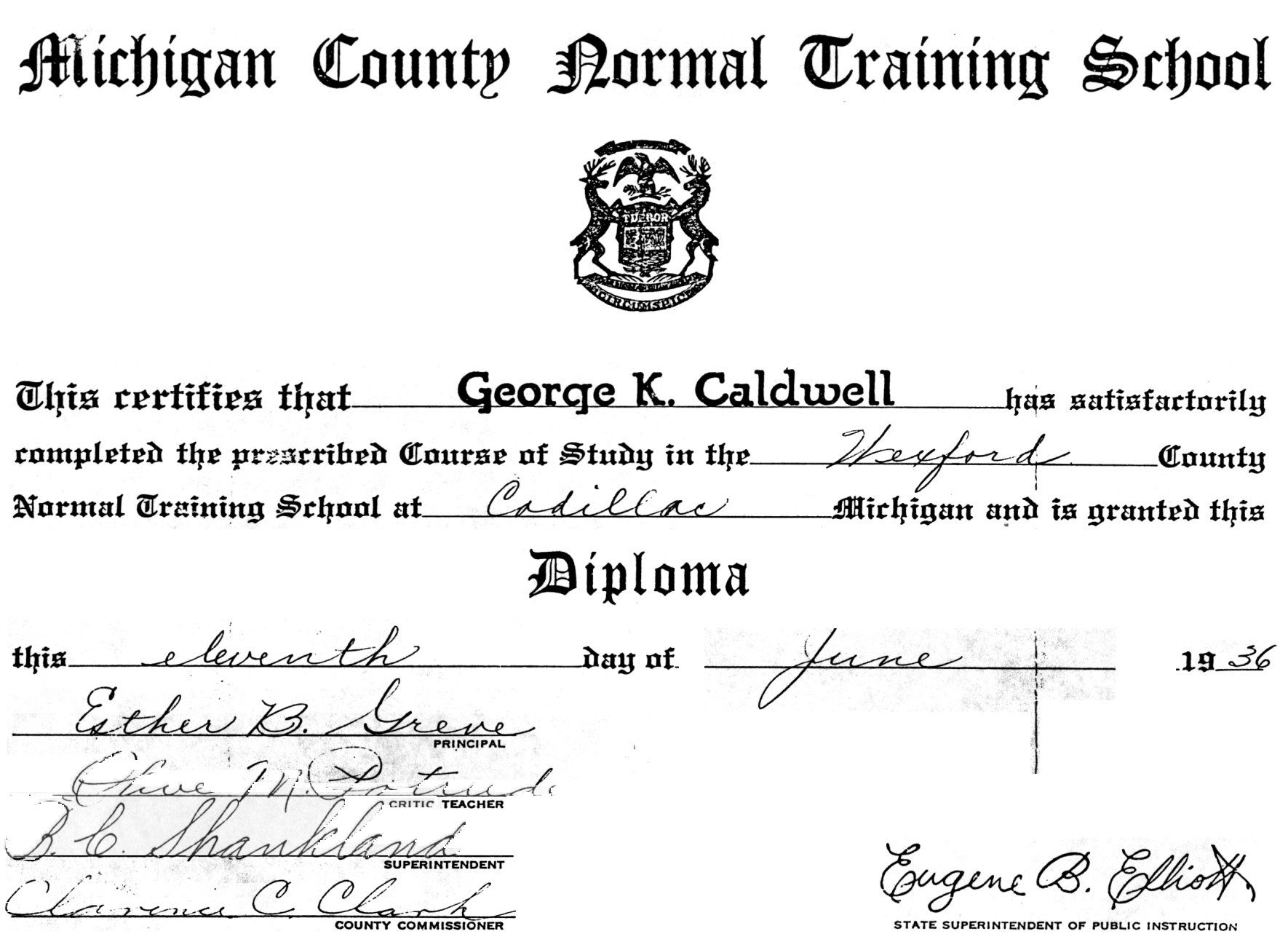
Diploma from a normal school in the U.S.

The first normal school west of the Appalachian Mountains in the United States was the Michigan State Normal School, now Eastern Michigan University. It was created by legislative action in 1849 and opened in Ypsilanti, Michigan, in 1853.

1857 – Illinois State Normal University, Normal, Illinois

The State of Illinois passed an act to establish a normal school on 18 February 1857, and proposals were submitted to locate the new school in Batavia, Bloomington, Peoria, and Washington (in Tazewell County). Bids were opened by the State Board of Education in Peoria on 7 May 1857 and the offer from Bloomington, Illinois, was accepted. The normal school was located near the village of North Bloomington, which later was renamed Normal in honor of the school. The school, originally known as Illinois State Normal University (ISNU), and also known as the Illinois State Teachers College, is now known as Illinois State University.

1857 – Harris Teachers College, St. Louis, Missouri

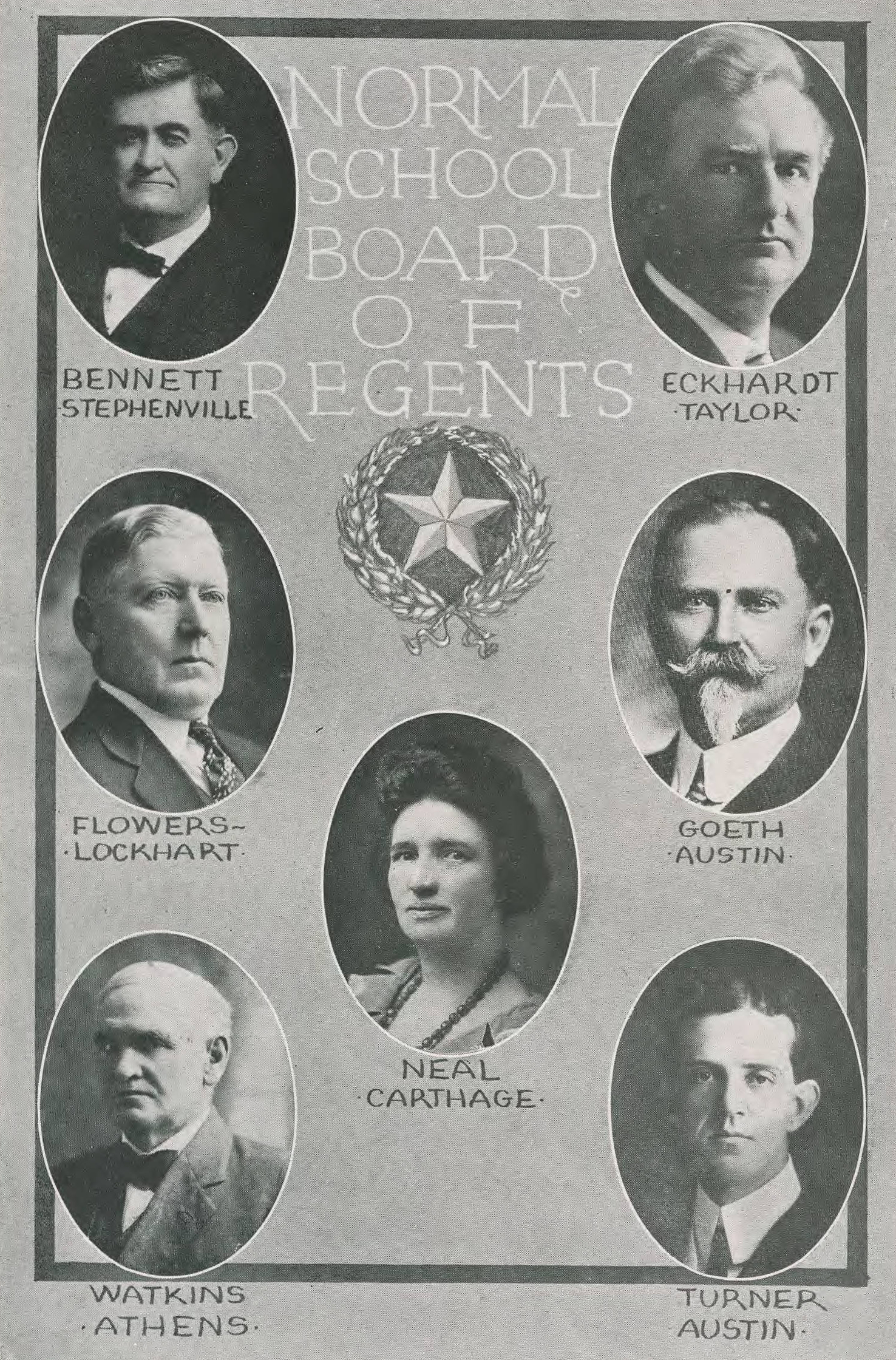
Texas Normal School Board of Regents in 1922

Harris–Stowe State University, now a state university in Missouri, was founded by the St. Louis public school system in 1857 and claims to be the oldest normal school west of the Mississippi River.

The modern university is the result of the merger of the two normal schools in the area, Harris Teachers College, the older of the two institutions and segregated for white people only, and Stowe Teachers' College, which was segregated for black people only, following the Brown vs. BOE decision in 1954.

1858 – Winona State Normal School, Winona, Minnesota

The first state-authorized normal college to open west of the Mississippi River was Winona State Normal School, now called Winona State University, which opened in 1858. Its creation was one of the first acts of the newly formed Minnesota Legislature.

1863 – Kansas State Normal Schools, Kansas

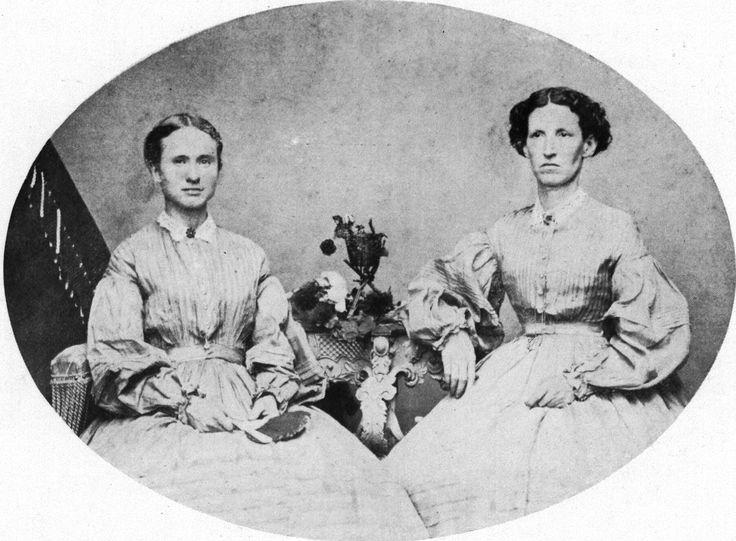
First graduating class at the Kansas State Normal School, 1867

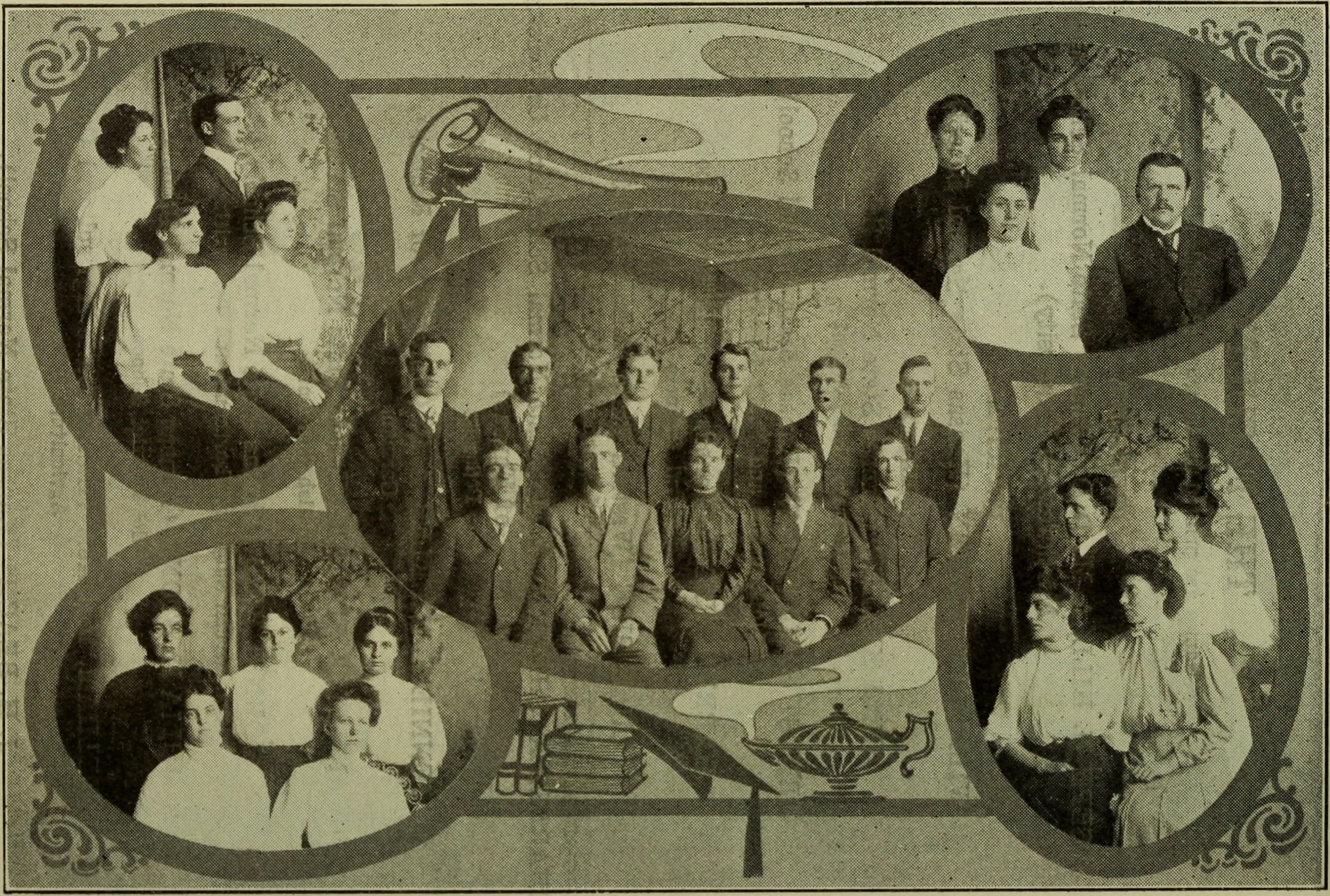
Officers and students of the Fort Hays Auxiliary State Normal School – first year –1902–1903 (1902)

In 1863, the Kansas Legislature passed an act to establish the Kansas State Normal Schools, starting with the first in Emporia, Kansas, which eventually became Emporia State University Teachers College. From 1870 through 1876, Leavenworth Normal School operated in Leavenworth, Kansas, and from 1874 through 1876 Concordia Normal School operated in Concordia, Kansas, but the "miscellaneous appropriations bill of 1876" caused Leavenworth and Concordia to close and consolidated operations at the Emporia location. Other normal schools were opened in Kansas including in 1902 the Western Branch of the Kansas Normal in Hays, Kansas, eventually becoming Fort Hays State University. In 1904, a branch in Pittsburg, Kansas, was opened as the Manual Training Auxiliary School, which eventually became Pittsburg State University.

1865 – Indiana State Normal School, Terre Haute, Indiana

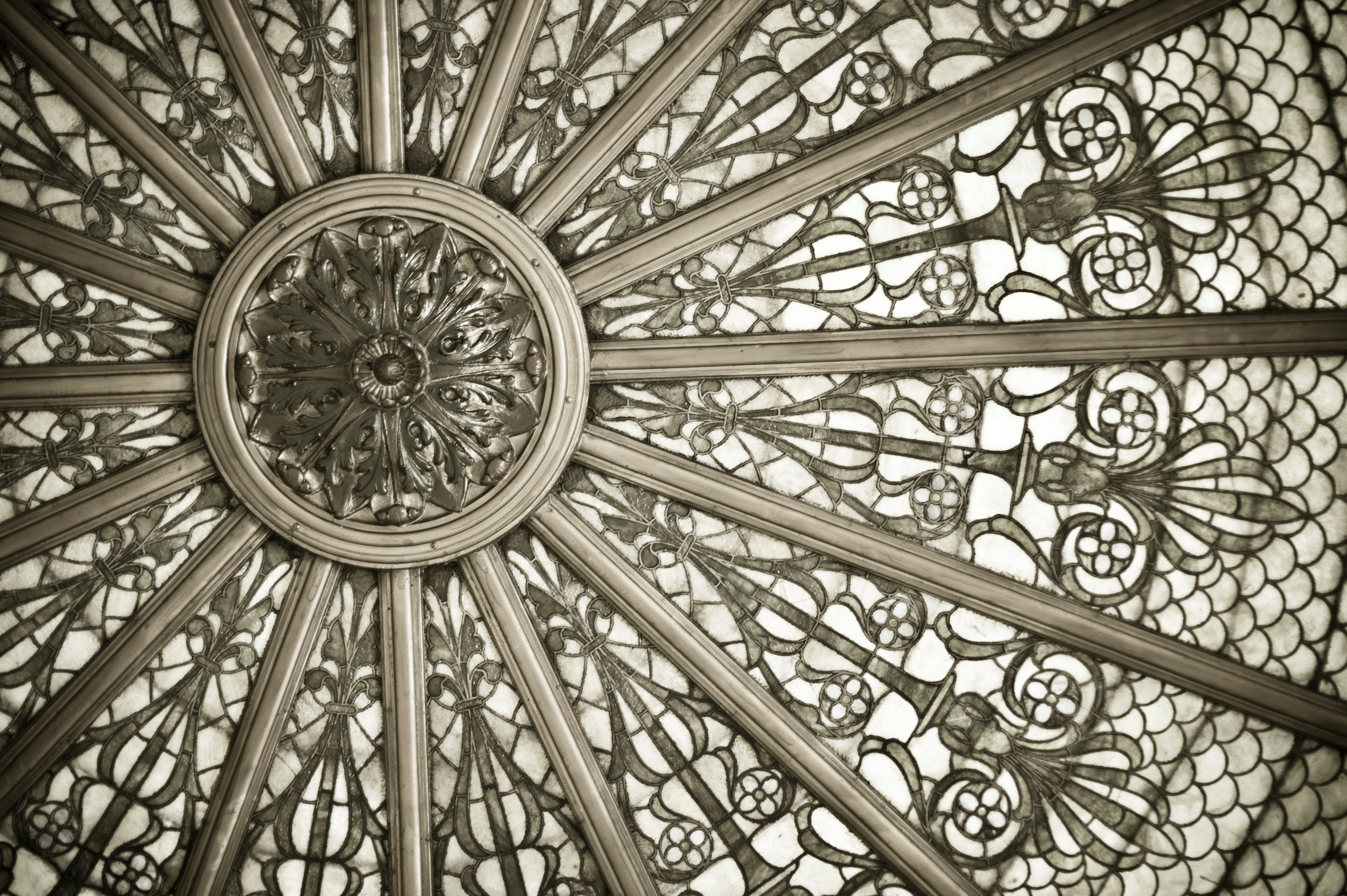
Indiana State's Fairbanks Hall Dome

Established by the Indiana General Assembly on December 20, 1865; as the State Normal School, its core mission was to educate elementary and high school teachers. The school awarded its first baccalaureate degrees in 1908 and the first master's degrees in 1928. In 1929, the Indiana State Normal School was renamed the Indiana State Teachers College, and in 1961, was renamed Indiana State College due to an expanding mission. In 1965, the Indiana General Assembly renamed the college as Indiana State University in recognition of continued growth.

1866 – Platteville Normal School, Platteville, Wisconsin

1867 – Nebraska State Normal School, Peru, Nebraska

Nebraska State Normal School was chartered on June 20, 1867. The action by the Nebraska legislature made it the first state-supported college in Nebraska with the first classes held on October 24, 1867. The name changed to Nebraska State Teachers College at Peru in 1921, and in 1949 it changed to Peru State Teachers College. The current name of Peru State College was adopted in 1963.

1868 – Mankato Normal School, Mankato, Minnesota

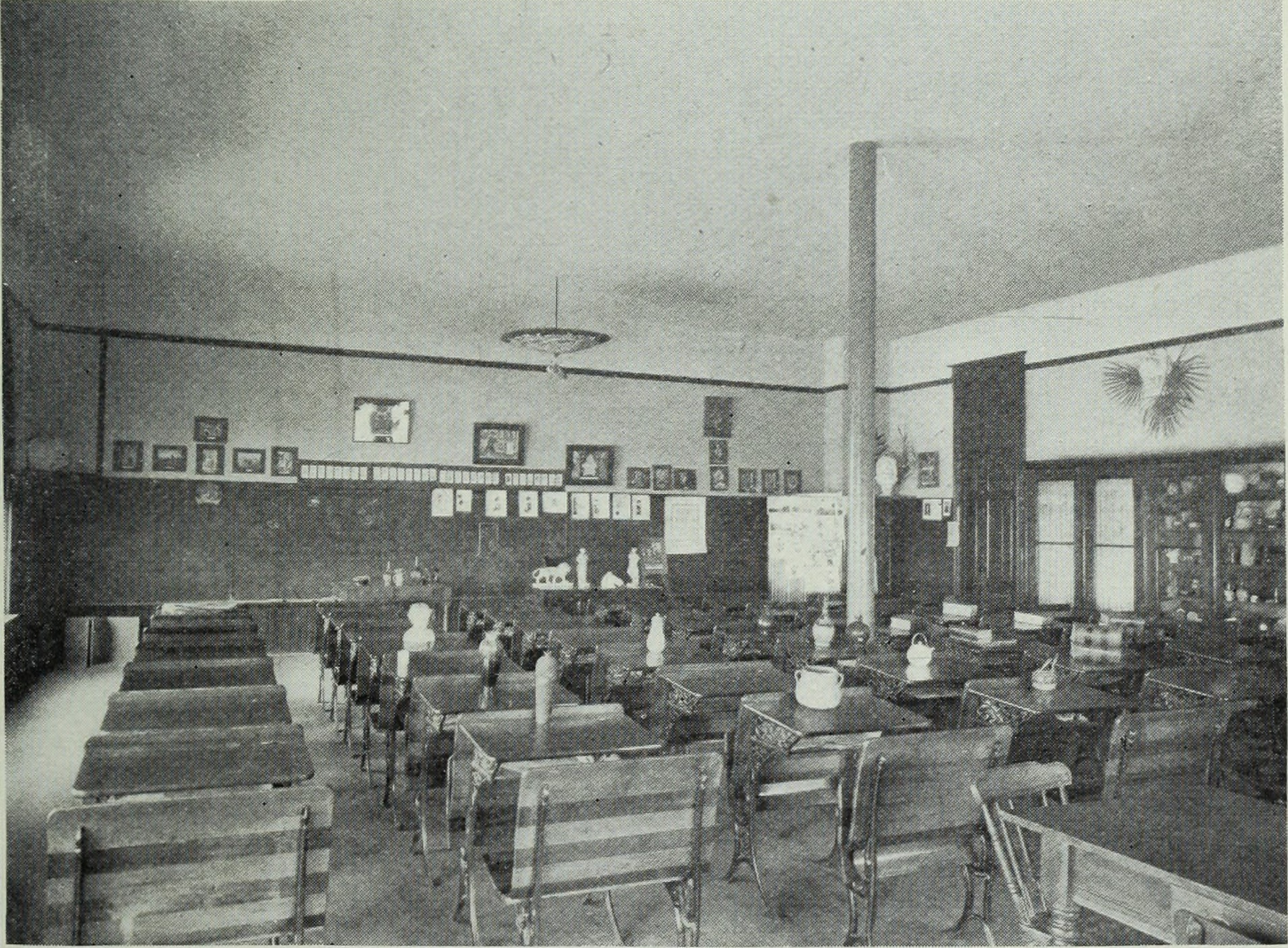
State Normal School at Mankato, Minnesota (1901)

Mankato Normal School was the second normal school in Minnesota. Students were usually 17–19 years old when they entered. The student body, which peaked at about 900 in 1920–21, was approximately three-fourths female. In 1921 the school evolved into Minnesota State University, Mankato.

1869 – Third State Normal School, St. Cloud, Minnesota

Located in St. Cloud, the Third State Normal School was the third normal school established in Minnesota. It welcomed 50 students (40 women and 10 men) as well as 70 children for the model school. Ira Moore was the school's first principal (later president). It graduated its first class, numbering 15, in June 1871. It trained mostly teachers through the end of World War II and then branched out into other disciplines. It is today's St. Cloud State University.

1876 – Iowa State Normal School, Cedar Falls, Iowa

Opened as Iowa State Normal School in 1876, the school took over the facilities that the state of Iowa originally built to be home to orphans of its Civil War Veterans. The school changed to Iowa State Teachers College in 1909, then State College of Iowa in 1961 before becoming the University of Northern Iowa in 1967.

1885 – Milwaukee State Normal School

1888 – Moorhead Normal School, Moorhead, Minnesota

Minnesota State Senator Solomon Comstock introduced a bill to the Minnesota State Legislature in 1885, declaring "...[a normal school] would be a fine thing for the Red River Country and especially for Moorhead." Comstock then donated six acres of land and the next session of the Legislature appropriated $60,000 for the construction of Main Hall, which included classrooms, administrative offices and a library. When The Moorhead Normal School opened in the fall of 1888, President Livingston Lord presided over five faculty members and a class of 29 students. As the school expanded over the years, it went through several name changes, eventually becoming Minnesota State University Moorhead in 2000.

1892 – Central Michigan Normal School and Business Institute, Mt. Pleasant, Michigan

Founded as a private normal school to address the lack of formal training in the "norms" of teaching. After the Michigan State Board of Education took over governance of the school it became a state institution and was renamed Central State Normal School in 1895. The institution became a full university and gained its current name Central Michigan University in 1959 under the university's 6th president Judson W. Foust.

1894 – Springfield Normal School, Springfield, Missouri

The Springfield Normal School was founded in 1894 in Springfield, Missouri, to train teachers for public schools in southwest Missouri. This private school offered a Masters of Pedagogy as a two-year post high school degree. Students also participated in a variety of extra curricular activities. Enrollment was as high as 700 students.

In 1906, the private school merged with the new state normal school becoming the Fourth District Normal School. The school moved to its current site with the completion of the building now called Carrington Hall in 1909. The school has evolved into a research university and is now Missouri State University.

1899 – Ellendale State Normal and Industrial School

This was one of the schools of higher learning provided for in North Dakota's 1889 constitution. Courses included American citizenship, cooking, woodworking, physical education, and others that together were offered as "a living symbol of democracy".

==== Ohio ====
In 1871, the Northwestern Ohio Normal School, which later became Ohio Northern University, was founded in Ada, Ohio. The Lowry Normal School Bill of 1910 authorized two new normal schools in Ohio—one in the northwestern part of the state (now Bowling Green State University) and another in the northeastern part (now Kent State University).

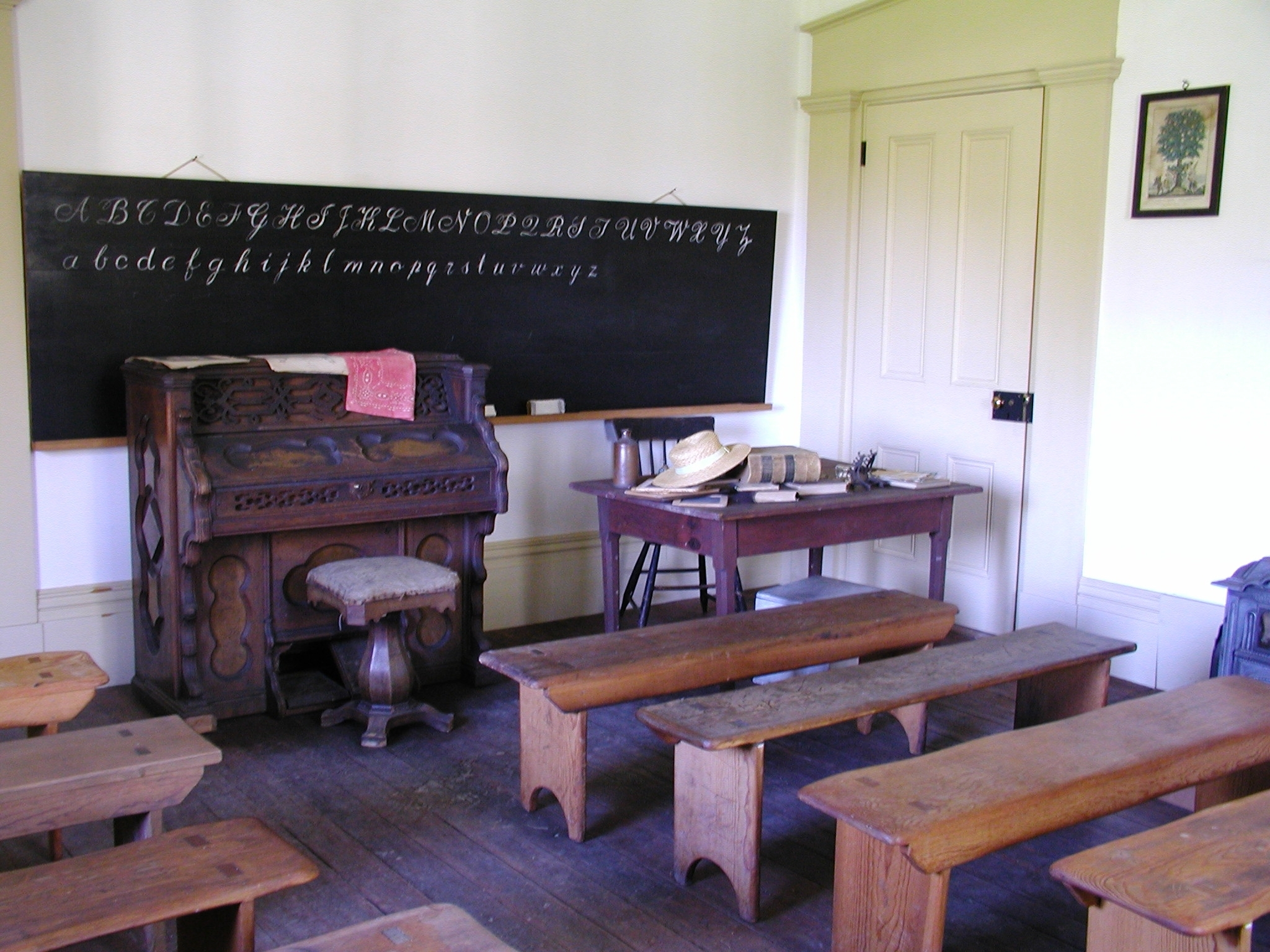
Reconstructed classroom at Storer College

=== South ===
1868 – Storer Normal School, Harpers Ferry, West Virginia

It served primarily African-American students; teachers were desperately needed after the Civil War, with large numbers of freed slaves to teach reading, writing, and arithmetic to. The school was part of Storer College, although in the 19th century it did not provide college-level instruction. The school closed in 1955.

1872 – Florence Normal School, Florence, Alabama

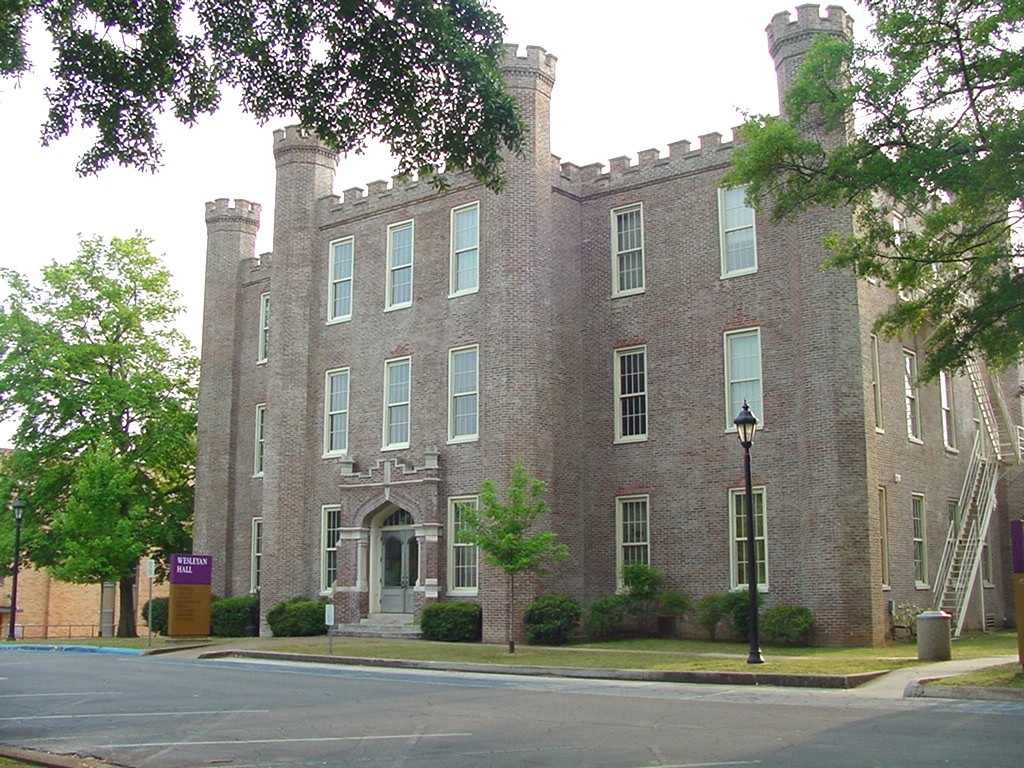
Historic Wesleyan Hall in Florence, Alabama

Florence Normal School is one of many state normal schools that developed into four-year state teachers' colleges and eventually into comprehensive state universities. This is the site of the first state-supported normal school established south of the Ohio River and now part of the University of North Alabama.

1873 – State Normal School, Normal, Alabama

In 1873, the State Normal School and University for the Education of the Colored Teachers and Students, informally called the Huntsville Normal School, was founded at a site which is today part of Huntsville, Alabama. In 1878, the name changed to State Normal and Industrial School. In 1885 the name was changed again, to State Normal and Industrial School of Huntsville. In 1890, the post office of Normal, Alabama, was established. In 1896, its name was changed to The State Agricultural and Mechanical College for Negroes, and in 1919, the State Agricultural and Mechanical Institute for Negroes. In 1948 it was renamed the Alabama Agricultural and Mechanical College, in 1949 Alabama A&M College, and in 1969 Alabama A&M University.

1876 – Glasgow Normal School and Business College, Glasgow, Kentucky

In 1876, local businessman A. W. Mell opened a private normal school and business college in the small South Central Kentucky town of Glasgow. The institution changed its name to Southern Normal School and Business College when it moved to the larger city of Bowling Green. In 1906, after the Kentucky General Assembly (state legislature) authorized the creation of state-sponsored normal schools, the Southern Normal School was sold to the state, while the business school was sold privately, becoming Bowling Green Business University and later the Bowling Green College of Commerce. The normal school's facilities and student body became the new Western Kentucky State Normal School, which moved within Bowling Green in 1911 to the former site of Potter College, a women's college that had closed in 1909. Once the normal school was authorized by the state to offer four-year degrees in 1922, it was renamed Western Kentucky State Normal School and Teachers College. It changed its name twice more in the next 30 years, first to Western Kentucky State Teachers College in 1930 and Western Kentucky State College in 1948. WKSC merged with Bowling Green Commerce in 1963, with the latter becoming a constituent college of WKSC. The current institutional name of Western Kentucky University was adopted in 1966.

1877 – Summer Normal School of the University of North Carolina

In accordance with an act of the North Carolina General Assembly, the University of North Carolina at Chapel Hill opened a normal school in the summer of 1877. North Carolina was the first state in America to open a normal school under the control of an already-established university. The program was also the first university summer school in the United States. Coeducational from the beginning, it was the first example of public funds supporting education for women in North Carolina. One of the teachers, Emily M. Coe, was the first female teacher of classes at the university.

1879 – Sam Houston Normal Institute, Huntsville, Texas

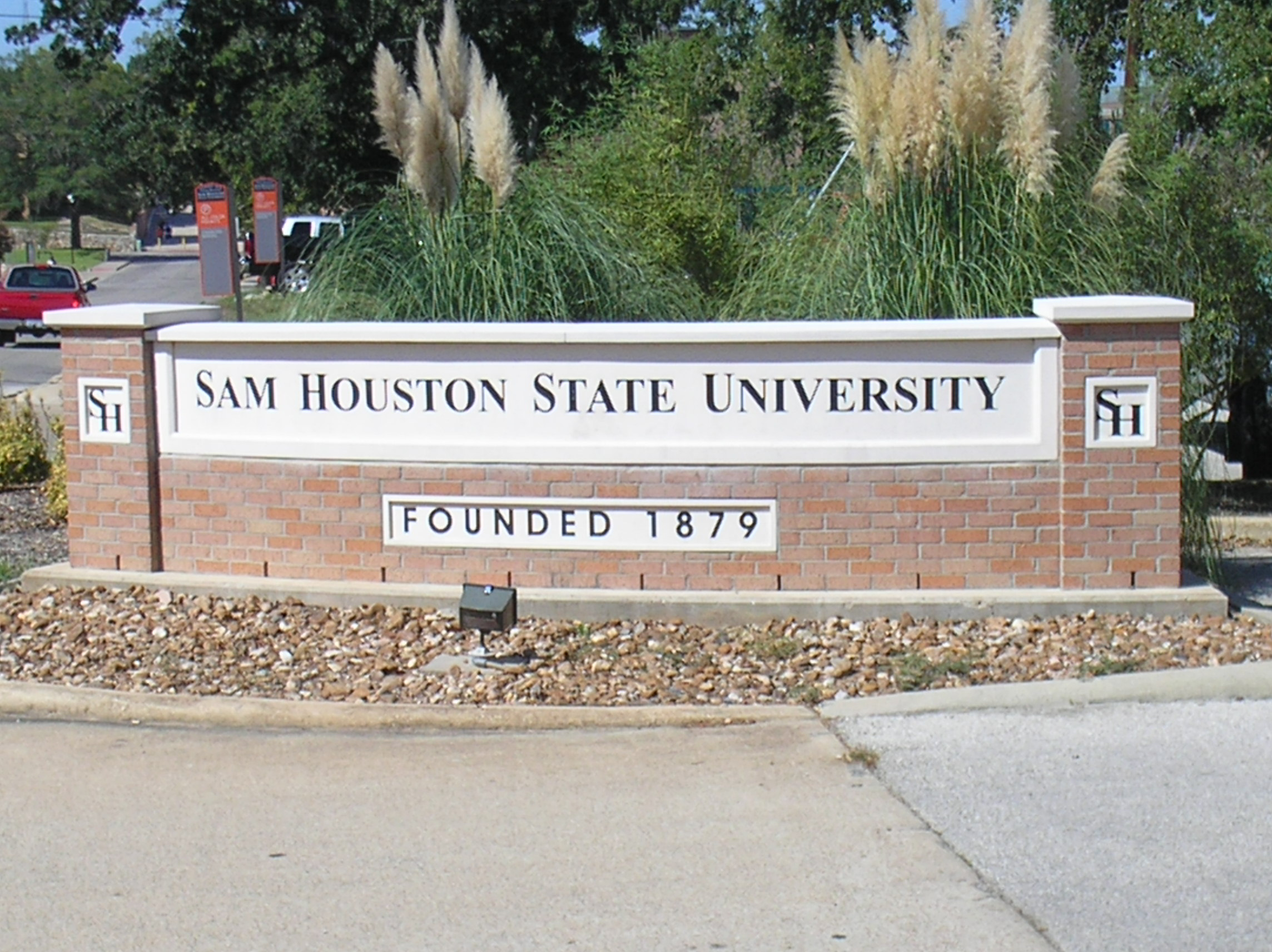
Entrance at Sam Houston State University, the first normal school in the American Southwest

The first normal school in what is now considered the Southwest was opened in 1879 as Sam Houston Normal Institute (now Sam Houston State University).

1882 – Virginia Normal and Collegiate Institute (now Virginia State University) was founded, Petersburg, Virginia.

1884 – Louisiana State Normal School, Natchitoches, Louisiana

From its founding in 1884 until 1944, Northwestern State University of Louisiana at Natchitoches was the Louisiana State Normal School until 1918, Louisiana State Normal College from 1918 to 1944.

1886 – Winthrop Training School, Rock Hill, South Carolina

In 1886, the Peabody Education Board of Massachusetts, headed by Robert C. Winthrop, provided $1,500 to form the "Winthrop Training School" for white women teachers. That year the school opened its doors to twenty-one students in Columbia, South Carolina. Nine years later in 1895 it moved to Rock Hill. The school's name had changed in 1893 to "Winthrop Normal and Industrial College of South Carolina", reflecting its mission to prepare some students for industrial jobs.

The college was segregated until 1964. It became fully coeducational in 1974. Evolving from a training school to a college with a four-year full curriculum, it also developed a graduate division. By 1992 it reflected this development, changing its name to Winthrop University.

1886 – State Normal School for Colored Persons, Frankfort, Kentucky

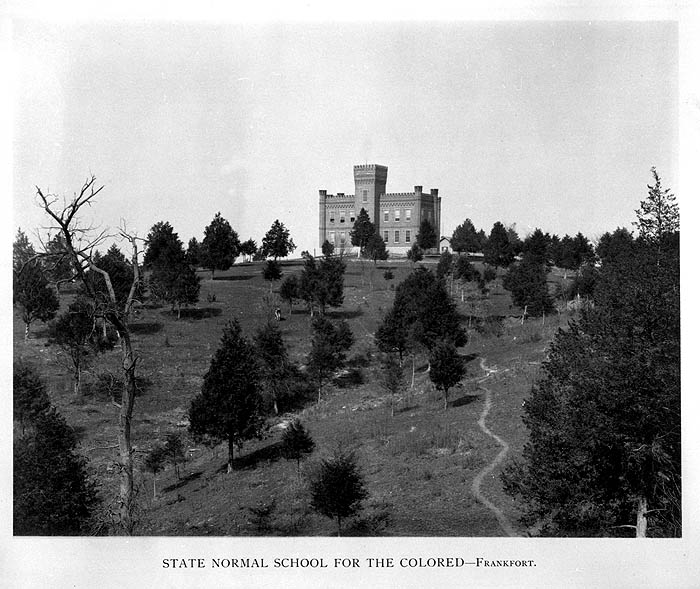
1898, State Normal School for Colored Persons, Frankfort, Kentucky

Chartered in 1886 as a state-supported school for training black teachers for the black schools of Kentucky, the school opened in 1887 with three teachers and 55 students. The school went through a series of changes of name and purpose, including becoming a land-grant college in 1890, in 1902 it was renamed Kentucky Normal and Industrial Institute for Colored Persons, in 1926 Kentucky State Industrial College for Colored Persons, in 1938 Kentucky State College for Negroes, in 1952 Kentucky State College, and finally in 1972 it became what it is known today as Kentucky State University.

1887 – Croatan Normal School, Pembroke, North Carolina

The school was established March 7, 1887 by the North Carolina General Assembly to train Lumbee Indian teachers. Today, it is The University of North Carolina at Pembroke.

1887 – Morehead Normal School, Morehead, Kentucky

In 1887, Morehead Normal School was founded as a private institution in Morehead, Kentucky. It continued to operate as such until 1922, when it was taken over by the state and became Morehead State Normal School. After name changes to Morehead State Normal School and Teachers College (1926), Morehead State Teachers College (1930), and Morehead State College (1948), it adopted its current name of Morehead State University in 1966.

1887 – State Normal College for Colored Students, Tallahassee, Florida

Also in 1887, the State Normal College for Colored Students was founded in Tallahassee, Florida; Tallahassee was chosen because it had the state's highest proportion of black people, having been the center of Florida's slave trade before the Civil War. The founding date reflects the Florida Constitution of 1885, in effect until 1967, which prohibited racial integration in education. In 1891 the legislature changed its name to State Normal and Industrial College for Colored Students, and in 1909 to Florida Agricultural and Mechanical College for Negroes. Today it is the Florida Agricultural and Mechanical University, commonly known as FAMU.

1889 - East Texas Normal College, Commerce, Texas

A normal school founded as East Texas Normal College in 1889 by Professor William Leonidas Mayo in Cooper, Texas. A fire on campus resulted in relocation of the college to nearby Commerce in 1895. Joinging the Texas State College and University System in 1917, it became East Texas State Normal College. After broadening academic programs and administrative expansion, the name was changed to East Texas State Teacher's College and in 1964, it became East Texas State University. In 1996, it joined the Texas A&M University System and is now entitled East Texas A&M University (ETAMU). ETAMU is the fourth oldest state institution of higher education in Texas and is the alma mater of former Speaker of the U.S. House of Representatives Sam Rayburn.

1899 – Appalachian State Normal School, Boone, North Carolina

A normal school founded as Watauga Academy in 1899, the institution was named Appalachian State Normal School in between 1925 and 1929. Today, it is known as Appalachian State University and has evolved into a comprehensive four-year university, including the Reich College of Education.

1906 – Eastern Kentucky State Normal School No. 1, Richmond, Kentucky

The same Kentucky law that authorized the state to take over the school now known as Western Kentucky University (see 1876 above) also led to the creation of a second normal school in Richmond. Much like the predecessor to WKU, the Richmond institution, originally known as Eastern Kentucky State Normal School No. 1, took over the campus of an earlier institution, though under somewhat different circumstances. The Eastern Normal School was established in 1906 on the former campus of Central University, an institution that had been founded in 1874 but fell into financial difficulty, and consolidated itself with Centre College in 1901. The Normal School went through several name changes in the following decades—first to Eastern Kentucky State Normal School and Teachers College (1922), Eastern Kentucky State Teachers College (1930), Eastern Kentucky State College (1948), and finally Eastern Kentucky University (1966).

1910 – Mississippi Normal College, Hattiesburg, Mississippi

Mississippi Normal College was established by an act of the Mississippi state legislature, and approved by then Governor Edmund F. Noel on March 30, 1910. In September 1910, the city of Hattiesburg and Forrest County bid $250,000 for the rights to host the new school, along with land for its establishment, with the college first holding classes in September 1912. The first teaching certificate awarded by Mississippi Normal School was to Sarah E. Allen on July 19, 1913. The legislature changed the school's name to State Teachers College in March 1924 and subsequently changed the name to Mississippi Southern College in February 1940. On February 27, 1962, the Mississippi Legislature changed the name to The University of Southern Mississippi.

1922 – Murray State Normal School, Murray, Kentucky

A Kentucky law enacted in 1922 authorized the creation of two new state-run normal schools in addition to those already operating in Bowling Green and Richmond (the institutions now known respectively as Western Kentucky University and Eastern Kentucky University). A normal school in Murray was created alongside one in Morehead (now Morehead State University). Unlike the three aforementioned schools, the Murray State Normal School was created from scratch, and had no buildings of its own when it began operation. The first classes were held in 1923 at the then-current campus of Murray High School, but the Normal School soon had its own facilities. The Normal School went through several name changes in the following decades—first to Murray State Normal School and Teachers College (1922), Murray State Teachers College (1930), Murray State College (1948), and finally Murray State University (1966).

=== West ===
1857 – California State Normal School, San Jose, California

The first state-run normal school on the West Coast was the Minns Evening Normal School, created in 1857 to train teachers for San Francisco's schools. It was taken over by the State of California in 1862 and became the California State Normal School (now San Jose State University).

1882 - Oregon State Normal School, Monmouth, Oregon

Originally founded in 1856 as Monmouth University, the Oregon State Legislature approved the college's bid to become a state-supported teacher training (or "normal school") school in 1882, Oregon State Normal School. The university underwent numerous name changes before becoming Western Oregon University in 1997.

1890 – Colorado State Normal School, Greeley, Colorado

The Colorado legislature passed the controversial Senate Bill 104 to establish the State Normal School of Colorado, which Governor Job Adams Cooper signed into law on April 1, 1889. Located in Greeley, Colorado, the school opened on October 6, 1890, to train qualified teachers for the state's public schools, with a staff of four instructors and 96 students, offering certification after completing a two-year course. In 1911, the school's name was changed to Colorado State Teachers College and offered bachelor's degrees after completion of a four-year course. In 1935, the name changed again to Colorado State College of Education, recognizing the graduate program started in 1913. In 1957, the name was shortened to Colorado State College to recognize the further growth of programs and offerings. Finally, in 1970, the name was changed to the current University of Northern Colorado, with satellite centers in Loveland, Colorado Springs and the Lowry neighborhood of Denver.

1910 – Western State College of Colorado, Gunnison, Colorado

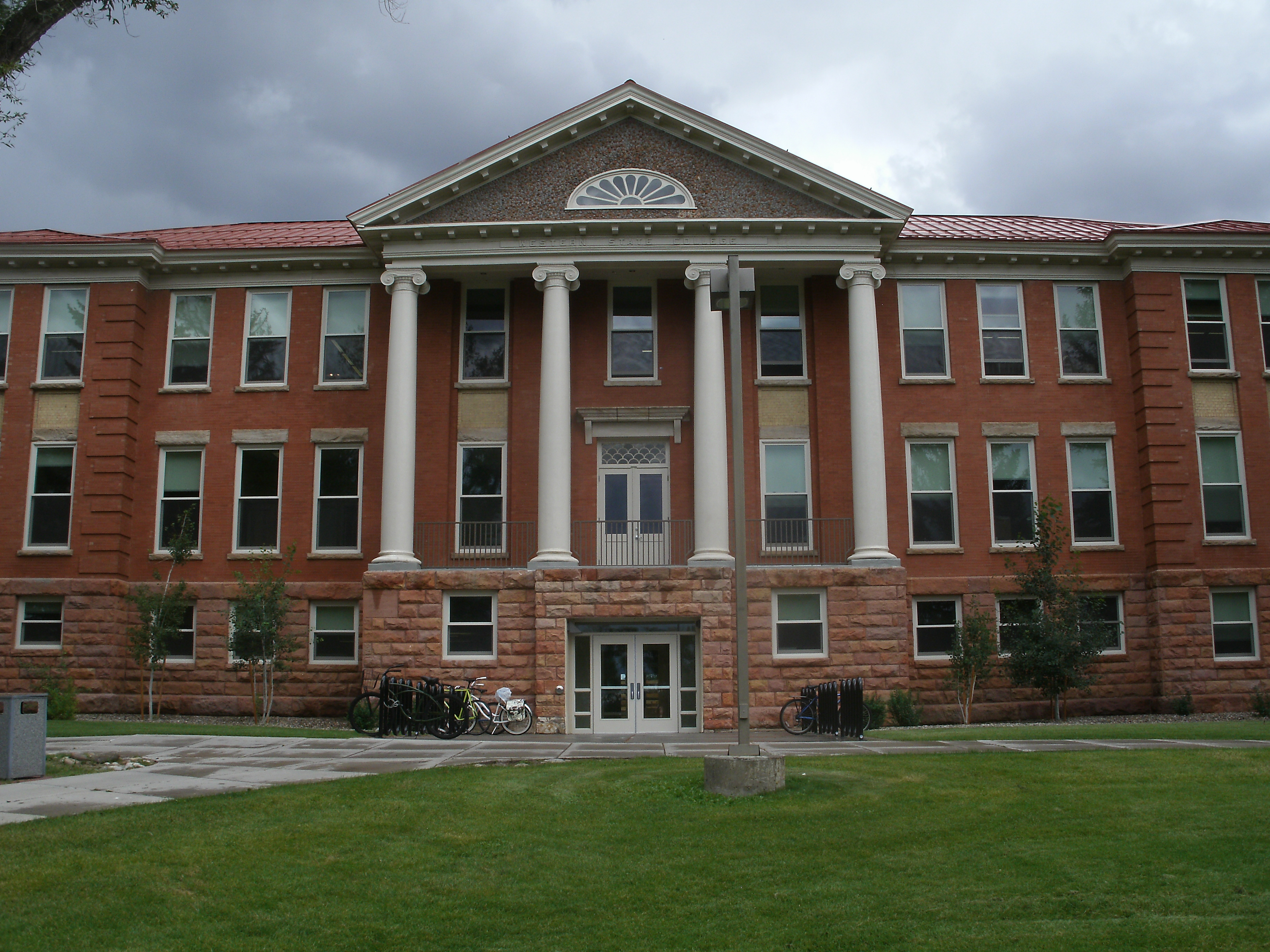
North Hall of the present day Taylor Hall, Western Colorado University (2012)

Colorado state senator A. M. Stevenson in 1885 introduced a bill for a State Normal School. The bill was rejected. The bill revived in 1896. State Representative C. T. Rawalt succeeded in appropriating $2,500 for land in 1901. Gov. James B. Orman approved the bill April 16, 1901. Trustees were elected and plans made in Gunnison, Colorado in the northeast part of town. Grounds were surveyed and fenced, shade trees added, drives laid out, and the lawns seeded. 12 cents remained of the $2,500 allotted. In 1903 a bill for $18,000 for maintenance was vetoed by Gov. J. H. Peabody. On May 5, 1909, $50,000 was appropriated. On October 25, 1910, the cornerstone of North Hall was laid for the State Normal School of Colorado. C. A. Hollingshead was principal of the two year normal advanced and four year normal elementary (High school). In 1916 the name was changed to Western State College of Colorado. On August 1, 2012, John Hickenlooper enacted the new name Western State Colorado University, and in 2018 the current name of Western Colorado University was adopted.

=== Other normal schools in the US ===
- 1861 – Edinboro State Normal School, later Edinboro University of Pennsylvania
- 1862 – Mansfield State Normal School, later Mansfield University of Pennsylvania
- 1862 – California State Normal School, later San José State University in San Jose and the University of California, Los Angeles in Los Angeles
- 1867 – Cook County Normal School, later Chicago State University, and Northeastern Illinois University
- 1867 – State Normal School of Marshall College, later Marshall University of West Virginia
- 1867 – Fredonia Normal College, established as Fredonia Academy in 1826, became a normal school December 2, 1867. In 1948 it became State University of New York at Fredonia
- 1869 – Southern Illinois State Normal School, later Southern Illinois University Carbondale
- 1871 – Buffalo Normal School opened September 13 later State University of New York College at Buffalo also known as Buffalo State College
- 1875 – Indiana Normal School, later Indiana University of Pennsylvania
- 1882 – Normal School at Cheney, later Eastern Washington University
- 1882 – Virginia Normal and Collegiate Institute, then Virginia Normal and Industrial Institute, later Virginia State University
- 1885 - Territorial Normal School, then Tempe Normal School, later Arizona State University
- 1886 – Washington State Normal School at Bellingham or Northwest Normal School or State Normal School at Whatcom, later Western Washington University
- 1887 – Northern Branch of the California State Normal School, later California State University, Chico
- 1889 – State Normal School at Cheney, later Eastern Washington University
- 1889 – State Normal School of Colorado, in Greeley, Colorado later University of Northern Colorado, and in 1911 in Gunnison, Colorado later Western Colorado University
- 1889- Slippery Rock State Normal School, later Slippery Rock University of Pennsylvania
- 1890 – State Normal School at Valley City, later Valley City State University of North Dakota
- 1890 – Territorial Normal School, later University of Central Oklahoma
- 1891 – Washington State Normal School in Ellensburg, later Central Washington University
- 1891 – State Normal School (Athens, Georgia), later University of Georgia
- 1892 – Lowell Normal School, later University of Massachusetts Lowell
- 1895 – Duluth State Normal School, later University of Minnesota Duluth
- 1895 – Northern Illinois State Normal School, later Northern Illinois University
- 1895 – Eastern Illinois State Normal School, later Eastern Illinois University
- 1897 – San Diego Normal School, later San Diego State University
- 1899 – Western Illinois State Normal School, later Western Illinois University
- 1899 – Southwest Texas State Normal School, later Texas State University
- 1899 – San Francisco State Normal School, later San Francisco State University
- 1903 – Western State Normal School, later Western Michigan University
- 1909 – Santa Barbara State Normal School, later University of California, Santa Barbara
- 1910 – West Texas State Normal College, later West Texas A&M University
- 1910 – Mississippi Normal College, later University of Southern Mississippi
- 1915 – Humboldt State Normal School, later California State Polytechnic University, Humboldt
- 1923 – Durham State Normal School, later North Carolina Central University
- 1925 – Maryland State Normal School, later Salisbury University
- 1927 – Eastern Montana Normal School, later Montana State University Billings

== See also ==
- Normal school, for rest of world
- List of normal schools by country
- Teacher education , for rest of world
