= Baltimore Association for the Moral and Educational Improvement of the Colored People =

Organization in Baltimore, Maryland, US

The Baltimore Association for the Moral and Educational Improvement of the Colored People, also known as the Baltimore Association for the Moral and Intellectual Improvement of the Colored People was an organization that aimed to improve the education of African Americans in the Baltimore, Maryland. It was founded on November 28, 1864 (shortly after African Americans won theoretical suffrage rights in Maryland) by a group of white men.

The organization established some 40 schools. In 1866, the school it operated for African American students was described as having 400 pupils taught by white teachers.

Funding for the schools was obtained from donors, including Quakers, Unitarians including John F. W. Ware, and a Jewish leader. After a few years the Baltimore City Council contributed funds. Operation of the schools was taken over by the city in 1867.

There was a great deal of resistance and opposition and some of its schools and organizers were attacked.

Only white teachers were permitted until the late 1880s.
