= Emily M. Coe =

American educator

- Born: Norwalk, Ohio
- Occupation: Teacher

Emily M. Coe was an American educator and pioneer of education for young children.

Born near Norwalk, Ohio, she graduated from Mt. Holyoke Seminary in 1853. She taught in seminaries and colleges in New England and Pennsylvania, and at the Spingler Institute in New York City. She came to believe that the education of young children was of vital importance as a basis upon which formal education could build. She established the American kindergarten, the first school of the kind in New York City, using a system based on more than twenty years of practical work in the school-room. Later, she founded the Normal Training School in East Orange, New Jersey. In 1872 she went to Europe for the purpose of studying educational methods.

Coe traveled extensively in the United States to give courses of lectures and conduct training classes in normal schools. For example, she is credited with introducing the kindergarten system to North Carolina as a regular teacher in 1878 and 1879 at the University of North Carolina's annual summer normal school (established in 1877). In this role, she was the first woman to teach classes at the university.

She was editor and proprietor of the "American Kindergarten Magazine," president of the American Kindergarten Society, and a life member of the National Teachers' Association.
