= 2022 North Dakota House of Representatives election =

- November 8, 2022

66 of the 94 seats in the North Dakota House of Representatives 48 seats needed for a majority

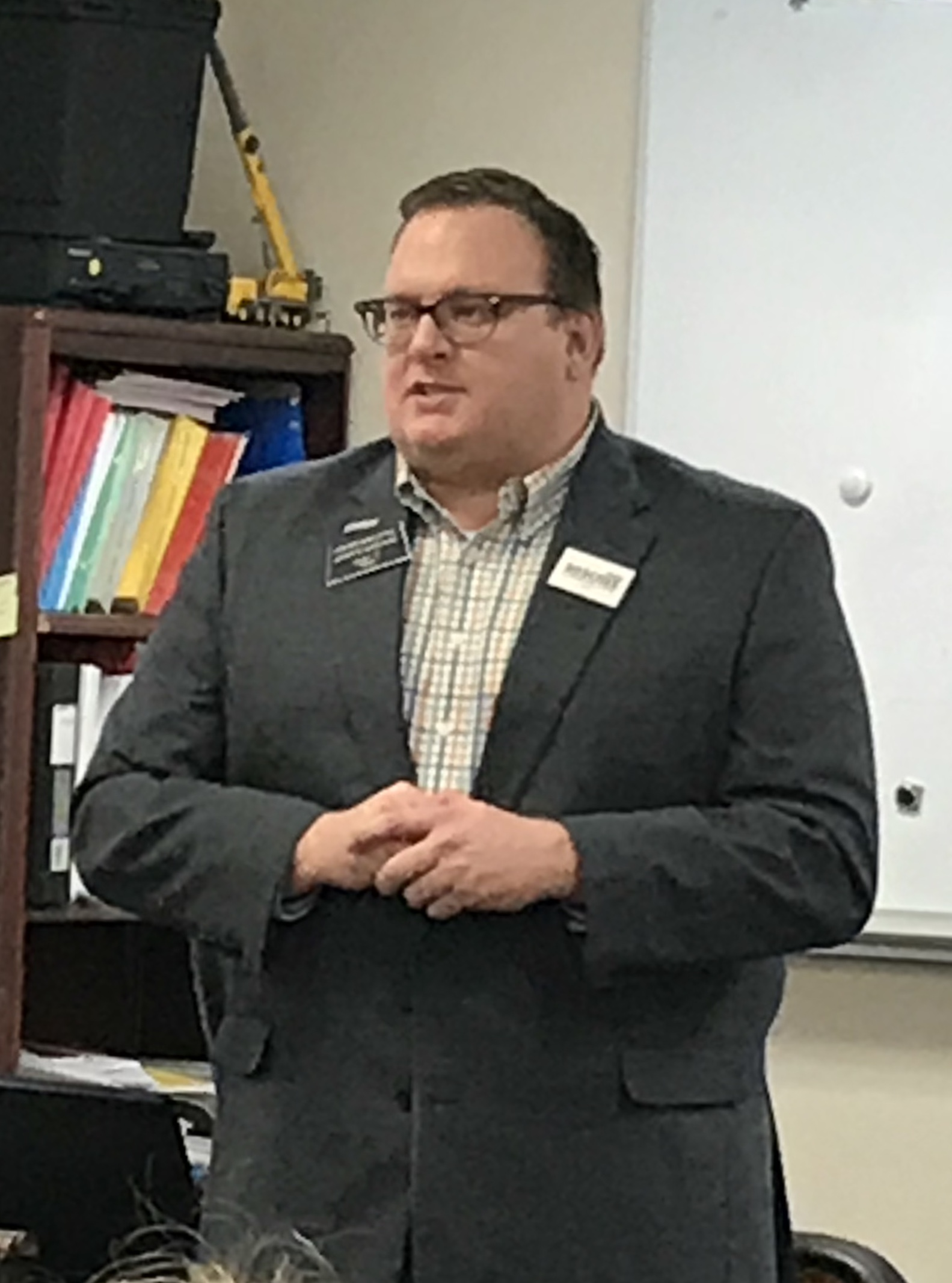
	Majority party	Minority party
Leader	Kim Koppelman (retired)	Joshua Boschee
Party	Republican	Democratic–NPL
Leader's seat	13th	44th
Seats before	80	14
Seats after	82	12
Seat change	▲2	▼2
Popular vote	196,917	51,956
Percentage	77.96%	20.57%
Swing	▲7.80%	▼8.52%
- Results: Republican gain Democratic-NPL gain Republican hold Democratic-NPL hold No election
Speaker before election
Kim Koppelman
Republican
Elected Speaker
Dennis Johnson
Republican

The 2022 North Dakota House of Representatives elections were held on November 8, 2022, as part of the biennial 2022 United States elections. 66 of the seats in the North Dakota House of Representatives were up for election. Primary elections were held on June 14, 2022. The elections coincided with elections for other offices in North Dakota, including the US Senate, US House, North Dakota Secretary of State, North Dakota Attorney General, and the North Dakota Senate.

Following the 2022 elections, Republicans expanded their supermajority by two seats, giving them an 82-to-12 member advantage over Democrats.

== Retirements ==
=== Democrats ===
1. District 11: Ron Guggisberg retired.
2. District 41: Pamela Anderson retired.

=== Republicans ===
1. District 3: Bob Paulson retired to run for state senator from District 3.
2. District 7: Rick Becker retired to run for U. S. senator.
3. District 8: Dave Nehring retired to run for state senator from District 8.
4. District 13: Kim Koppelman retired.
5. District 17: Mark Owens retired.
6. District 19: Gary Paur retired.
7. District 19: Wayne Trottier retired.
8. District 23: Bill Devlin retired.
9. District 26: Sebastian Ertelt retired to run for state senator from District 28.
10. District 28: Jeffery Magrum retired to run for state senator from District 8.
11. District 29: Chet Pollert retired.
12. District 39: Denton Zubke retired.
13. District 45: Mary Johnson retired.
14. District 45: Tom Kading retired.
15. District 47: Robb Eckert retired.

== Predictions ==
Source	Ranking	As of
Sabato's Crystal Ball	Safe R	May 19, 2022

== Defeated incumbents ==
=== Primary election ===
1. District 9A: Democratic incumbent Tracy Boe was defeated in the Democratic primary election by Jayme Davis.
2. District 9B: Republican incumbent Chuck Damschen was defeated in the Republican primary election by Republican Donna Henderson. Damschen also ran in the general election as a Republican write-in candidate and lost to Henderson again.
3. District 15: Republican incumbent Greg Westlind was defeated in the Republican primary election. He placed third behind Kathy Frelich and fellow Republican incumbent Dennis Johnson.
4. District 31: Republican incumbent Jim Schmidt was defeated in the Republican primary election. He placed third behind Dawson Holle and fellow Republican incumbent Karen Rohr.
5. District 33: Republican incumbent Jeff Delzer was defeated in the Republican primary election. He placed third behind Anna Novak and fellow Republican incumbent Bill Tveit.

=== General election ===
1. District 4A: Republican incumbent Terry B. Jones was defeated in the general election by Democrat Lisa Finley-DeVille.
2. District 9B: Democratic incumbent Marvin Nelson was defeated in the general election by Republican Donna Henderson.
3. District 25: Republican incumbent Kathy Skroch (Note: Redistricted from district 26 to 25.) was defeated in the general election by Democratic incumbent Alisa Mitskog and fellow Republican incumbent Cindy Schreiber-Beck.
4. District 27: Democratic incumbent Ruth Buffalo was defeated in the general election by Republicans Josh Christy and incumbent Greg Stemen.
5. District 43: Democratic incumbent Mary Adams was defeated in the general election by Republican Eric Murphy and fellow incumbent Democrat Zac Ista.

== Summary of results by State House district ==
- Districts not listed were not up for election in 2022.

Old district	Incumbent	Party	New district	Elected Representative	Party
1st	Patrick Hatlestad	Rep	1st	Patrick Hatlestad	Rep
1st	David Richter	Rep	1st	David Richter	Rep
3rd	Jeff Hoverson	Rep	3rd	Jeff Hoverson	Rep
3rd	Bob Paulson	Rep	3rd	Lori VanWinkle	Rep
4th (Note: Following redistricting, the old 4th district was separated into two new districts, 4A and 4B.)	Terry Jones	Rep	4A (Note: Election for an unexpired 2-year term.)	Lisa Finley-DeVille	Dem–NPL
4th	Clayton Fegley	Rep	4B	Clayton Fegley	Rep
5th	Jay Fisher	Rep	5th	Jay Fisher	Rep
5th	Scott Louser	Rep	5th	Scott Louser	Rep
7th	Jason Dockter	Rep	7th	Jason Dockter	Rep
7th	Rick Becker	Rep	7th	Matthew Heilman	Rep
8th	Jeff Delzer (Note: Redistricted from district 8 to 33.)	Rep	8th	SuAnn Olson	Rep
8th	Dave Nehring	Rep	8th	Brandon Prichard	Rep
9th (Note: Following redistricting, the old 9th district was separated into two new districts, 9A and 9B.)	Tracy Boe	Dem–NPL	9A	Jayme Davis	Dem–NPL
9th	Marvin Nelson	Dem–NPL	9B	Donna Henderson	Rep
10th	Chuck Damschen (Note: Redistricted from district 10 to 9B.)	Rep	10th	Hamida Dakane	Dem–NPL
10th	David Monson (Note: Redistricted from district 10 to 19.)	Rep	10th	Steve Swiontek	Rep
11th	Gretchen Dobervich	Dem–NPL	11th	Gretchen Dobervich	Dem–NPL
11th	Ron Guggisberg	Dem–NPL	11th	Liz Conmy	Dem–NPL
13th	Kim Koppelman	Rep	13th	Jim Jonas	Rep
13th	Austen Schauer	Rep	13th	Austen Schauer	Rep
15th	Dennis Johnson	Rep	15th	Dennis Johnson	Rep
15th	Greg Westlind	Rep	15th	Kathy Frelich	Rep
17th	Mark Owens	Rep	17th	Landon Bahl	Rep
17th	Mark Sanford	Rep	17th	Mark Sanford	Rep
19th	Gary Paur	Rep	19th	Karen Anderson	Rep
19th	Wayne Trottier	Rep	19th	David Monson	Rep
20th	Mike Beltz	Rep	20th	Mike Beltz	Rep
20th	Jared Hagert	Rep	20th	Jared Hagert	Rep
21st	LaurieBeth Hager	Dem–NPL	21st	LaurieBeth Hager	Dem–NPL
21st	Mary Schneider	Dem–NPL	21st	Mary Schneider	Dem–NPL
23rd	Bill Devlin	Rep	23rd	Scott Dyk	Rep
23rd	Don Vigesaa (Note: Redistricted from district 23 to 29.)	Rep	23rd	Nico Rios	Rep
24th	Cole Christensen	Rep	24th	Cole Christensen	Rep
24th	Dwight Kiefert	Rep	24th	Dwight Kiefert	Rep
25th	Alisa Mitskog	Dem–NPL	25th	Alisa Mitskog	Dem–NPL
25th	Cindy Schreiber-Beck	Rep	25th	Cindy Schreiber-Beck	Rep
26th	Sebastian Ertelt	Rep	26th	Jeremy Olson	Rep
26th	Kathy Skroch	Rep	26th	Kelby Timmons	Rep
27th	Greg Stemen	Rep	27th	Greg Stemen	Rep
27th	Ruth Buffalo	Dem–NPL	27th	Josh Christy	Rep
28th	Michael Don Brandenburg	Rep	28th	Michael Don Brandenburg	Rep
28th	Jeffery Magrum	Rep	28th	Jim Grueneich	Rep
29th	Craig Headland	Rep	29th	Craig Headland	Rep
29th	Chet Pollert	Rep	29th	Don Vigesaa	Rep
31st	Karen Rohr	Rep	31st	Karen Rohr	Rep
31st	Jim Schmidt	Rep	31st	Dawson Holle	Rep
33rd	Gary Kreidt (Note: Redistricted from district 33 to 36.)	Rep	33rd	Anna Novak	Rep
33rd	Bill Tveit	Rep	33rd	Bill Tveit	Rep
35th	Karen Karls	Rep	35th	Karen Karls	Rep
35th	Bob Martinson	Rep	35th	Bob Martinson	Rep
36th	Dori Hauck	Rep	36th	Dori Hauck	Rep
36th	Mike Schatz (Note: Redistricted from district 36 to 39.)	Rep	36th	Gary Kreidt	Rep
37th	Mike Lefor	Rep	37th	Mike Lefor	Rep
37th	Vicky Steiner	Rep	37th	Vicky Steiner	Rep
39th	Keith Kempenich	Rep	39th	Keith Kempenich	Rep
39th	Denton Zubke	Rep	39th	Mike Schatz	Rep
41st	Pamela Anderson	Dem–NPL	41st	Jorin Johnson	Rep
41st	Michelle Strinden	Rep	41st	Michelle Strinden	Rep
43rd	Mary Adams	Dem–NPL	43rd	Eric James Murphy	Rep
43rd	Zac Ista	Dem–NPL	43rd	Zac Ista	Dem–NPL
44th	Joshua Boschee	Dem–NPL	44th	Joshua Boschee	Dem–NPL
44th	Karla Rose Hanson	Dem–NPL	44th	Karla Rose Hanson	Dem–NPL
45th	Mary Johnson	Rep	45th	Carrie McLeod	Rep
45th	Tom Kading	Rep	45th	Scott Wagner	Rep
47th	Robb Eckert	Rep	47th	Mike Motschenbacher	Rep
47th	Lawrence Klemin	Rep	47th	Lawrence Klemin	Rep

Primary election results source:

General election results source:

== Detailed results ==
Primary Election Results Source:

General Election Results Source:

- Note: If a primary election is not listed, then there was not a competitive primary in that district (i.e., every candidate who ran in the primary advanced to the general election).

=== District 1 ===
General election

North Dakota's 1st House of Representatives District general election, 2022
Party	Candidate	Votes	%
Republican	David Richter (incumbent)	2,394	50.77%
Republican	Patrick Hatlestad (incumbent)	2,321	49.23%
Total votes		4,715	100.00%
Republican hold			
Republican hold			

=== District 3 ===
Republican primary

North Dakota's 3rd House of Representatives District Republican primary election, 2022
Party	Candidate	Votes	%
Republican	Lori VanWinkle	797	39.01%
Republican	Jeff Hoverson (incumbent)	627	30.69%
Republican	Roscoe Streyle	619	30.30%
Total votes		2,043	100.00%

General election

North Dakota's 3rd House of Representatives District general election, 2022
Party	Candidate	Votes	%
Republican	Lori VanWinkle	2,305	41.23%
Republican	Jeff Hoverson (incumbent)	2,258	40.39%
Democratic–NPL	Joseph A. Nesdahl	1,027	18.37%
Total votes		5,590	100.00%
Republican hold			
Republican hold			

=== District 4A ===
Republican primary

North Dakota's 4A House of Representatives District Democratic-NPL primary election, 2022
Party	Candidate	Votes	%
Democratic–NPL	Lisa Finley-DeVille	122	51.69%
Democratic–NPL	Thomasina Mandan	114	48.31%
Total votes		236	100.00%

General election

North Dakota's 4A House of Representatives District general election, 2022
Party	Candidate	Votes	%
Democratic–NPL	Lisa Finley-DeVille	1,230	69.22%
Republican	Terry B. Jones (incumbent)	547	30.78%
Total votes		1,777	100.00%
Democratic–NPL gain from Republican			

=== District 4B ===
General election

North Dakota's 4B House of Representatives District general election, 2022
Party	Candidate	Votes	%
Republican	Clayton Fegley (incumbent)	2,678	100.00%
Total votes		2,678	100.00%
Republican hold			

=== District 5 ===
General election

North Dakota's 5th House of Representatives District general election, 2022
Party	Candidate	Votes	%
Republican	Scott Louser (incumbent)	3,225	51.03%
Republican	Jay Fisher (incumbent)	3,095	48.97%
Total votes		6,320	100.00%
Republican hold			
Republican hold			

=== District 7 ===
Republican primary

North Dakota's 7th House of Representatives District Republican primary election, 2022
Party	Candidate	Votes	%
Republican	Jason Dockter (incumbent)	1,203	36.95%
Republican	Matthew Heilman	1,131	34.74%
Republican	Retha Mattern	922	28.32%
Total votes		3,256	100.00%

General election

North Dakota's 7th House of Representatives District general election, 2022
Party	Candidate	Votes	%
Republican	Jason Dockter (incumbent)	4,501	50.07%
Republican	Matthew Heilman	4,488	49.93%
Total votes		8,989	100.00%
Republican hold			
Republican hold			

=== District 8 ===
Republican primary

North Dakota's 8th House of Representatives District Republican primary election, 2022
Party	Candidate	Votes	%
Republican	SuAnn Olson	1,488	30.45%
Republican	Brandon Prichard	1,369	28.02%
Republican	Mike Berg	1,116	22.84%
Republican	Scott McCarthy	913	18.69%
Total votes		4,886	100.00%

General election

North Dakota's 8th House of Representatives District general election, 2022
Party	Candidate	Votes	%
Republican	Brandon Prichard	4,910	50.64%
Republican	SuAnn Olson	4,786	49.36%
Total votes		9,696	100.00%
Republican hold			
Republican hold			

=== District 9A ===
Democratic primary

North Dakota's 9A House of Representatives District Democratic-NPL primary election, 2022
Party	Candidate	Votes	%
Democratic–NPL	Jayme M. Davis	409	74.77%
Democratic–NPL	Tracy Boe (incumbent)	138	25.23%
Total votes		547	100.00%

General election

North Dakota's 9A House of Representatives District general election, 2022
Party	Candidate	Votes	%
Democratic–NPL	Jayme M. Davis	1,049	68.79%
Republican	Brenda Malo	476	31.21%
Total votes		1,525	100.00%
Democratic–NPL hold			

=== District 9B ===
Republican primary

North Dakota's 9B House of Representatives District Republican primary election, 2022
Party	Candidate	Votes	%
Republican	Donna Henderson	678	52.76%
Republican	Chuck Damschen (incumbent)	607	47.24%
Total votes		1,285	100.00%

General election

North Dakota's 9B House of Representatives District general election, 2022
Party	Candidate	Votes	%
Republican	Donna Henderson	1,595	56.70%
Democratic–NPL	Marvin Nelson (incumbent)	1,061	37.72%
Republican	Chuck Damschen (incumbent) (write-in)	157	5.58%
Total votes		2,813	100.00%
Republican gain from Democratic–NPL			

=== District 10 ===
General election

North Dakota's 10th House of Representatives District general election, 2022
Party	Candidate	Votes	%
Republican	Steve Swiontek	1,687	40.33%
Democratic–NPL	Hamida Dakane	1,343	32.11%
Democratic–NPL	Damian Ridl	1,153	27.56%
Total votes		4,183	100.00%
Republican hold			
Democratic–NPL gain from Republican			

=== District 11 ===
General election

North Dakota's 11th House of Representatives District general election, 2022
Party	Candidate	Votes	%
Democratic–NPL	Liz Conmy	2,573	28.39%
Democratic–NPL	Gretchen Dobervich (incumbent)	2,540	28.03%
Republican	Carter Eisinger	1,994	22.00%
Republican	Brad Leeser	1,955	21.57%
Total votes		9,062	100.00%
Democratic–NPL hold			
Democratic–NPL hold			

=== District 13 ===
General election

North Dakota's 13th House of Representatives District general election, 2022
Party	Candidate	Votes	%
Republican	Austen Schauer (incumbent)	3,889	52.14%
Republican	Jim Jonas	3,570	47.86%
Total votes		7,459	100.00%
Republican hold			
Republican hold			

=== District 15 ===
Republican primary

North Dakota's 15th House of Representatives District Republican primary election, 2022
Party	Candidate	Votes	%
Republican	Kathy Frelich	1,905	40.89%
Republican	Dennis Johnson (incumbent)	1,692	36.32%
Republican	Greg Westlind (incumbent)	1,062	22.79%
Total votes		4,659	100.00%

General election

North Dakota's 15th House of Representatives District general election, 2022
Party	Candidate	Votes	%
Republican	Kathy Frelich	3,405	41.63%
Republican	Dennis Johnson (incumbent)	3,160	38.63%
Democratic–NPL	Heather Lawrence-Skadsem	1,615	19.74%
Total votes		8,180	100.00%
Republican hold			
Republican hold			

=== District 17 ===
General election

North Dakota's 17th House of Representatives District general election, 2022
Party	Candidate	Votes	%
Republican	Mark Sanford (incumbent)	3,899	57.75%
Republican	Landon Bahl	2,853	42.25%
Total votes		6,752	100.00%
Republican hold			
Republican hold			

=== District 19 ===
Republican primary

North Dakota's 19th House of Representatives District Republican primary election, 2022
Party	Candidate	Votes	%
Republican	David Monson (incumbent)	1,584	26.43%
Republican	Karen A. Anderson	1,527	25.48%
Republican	Paul Stremick	1,465	24.45%
Republican	Alex Bata	1,417	23.64%
Total votes		5,993	100.00%

General election

North Dakota's 19th House of Representatives District general election, 2022
Party	Candidate	Votes	%
Republican	David Monson (incumbent)	4,150	39.92%
Republican	Karen A. Anderson	3,911	37.62%
Democratic–NPL	Jill Hipsher	1,222	11.75%
Democratic–NPL	Lynnell Popowski	1,114	10.71%
Total votes		10,397	100.00%
Republican hold			
Republican hold			

=== District 20 ===
Republican primary

North Dakota's 20th House of Representatives District Republican primary election, 2022
Party	Candidate	Votes	%
Republican	Jared Hagert (incumbent)	1,398	39.15%
Republican	Mike Beltz (incumbent)	1,359	38.06%
Republican	Craig Jarolimek	814	22.79%
Total votes		3,571	100.00%

General election

North Dakota's 20th House of Representatives District general election, 2022
Party	Candidate	Votes	%
Republican	Jared Hagert (incumbent)	3,656	36.93%
Republican	Mike Beltz (incumbent)	3,567	36.03%
Democratic–NPL	Thomas Passa	1,411	14.25%
Independent	Cathy (Kit) Brenan	1,266	12.79%
Total votes		9,900	100.00%
Republican hold			
Republican hold			

=== District 21 ===
General election

North Dakota's 21st House of Representatives District general election, 2022
Party	Candidate	Votes	%
Democratic–NPL	Mary Schneider (incumbent)	2,407	51.95%
Democratic–NPL	LaurieBeth Hager (incumbent)	2,226	48.05%
Total votes		4,633	100.00%
Democratic–NPL hold			
Democratic–NPL hold			

=== District 23 ===
General election

North Dakota's 23rd House of Representatives District general election, 2022
Party	Candidate	Votes	%
Republican	Scott Dyk	1,250	54.56%
Republican	Nico Rios	1,041	45.44%
Total votes		2,291	100.00%
Republican hold			
Republican hold			

=== District 24 ===
Republican primary

North Dakota's 24th House of Representatives District Republican primary election, 2022
Party	Candidate	Votes	%
Republican	Cole Christensen (incumbent)	1,394	39.52%
Republican	Dwight Harold Kiefert (incumbent)	1,188	33.68%
Republican	Phillip Kleymann	945	26.79%
Total votes		3,527	100.00%

General election

North Dakota's 24th House of Representatives District general election, 2022
Party	Candidate	Votes	%
Republican	Dwight Harold Kiefert (incumbent)	3,133	33.15%
Republican	Cole Christensen (incumbent)	2,816	29.80%
Independent	Madeline Z. Luke	2,456	25.99%
Democratic–NPL	Kaitlyn Huss	1,046	11.07%
Total votes		9,451	100.00%
Republican hold			
Republican hold			

=== District 25 ===
Republican primary

North Dakota's 25th House of Representatives District Republican primary election, 2022
Party	Candidate	Votes	%
Republican	Cindy Beck (incumbent)	1,559	45.87%
Republican	Kathy Skroch (incumbent)	1,187	34.92%
Republican	Jason Heitkamp	653	19.21%
Total votes		3,399	100.00%

General election

North Dakota's 25th House of Representatives District general election, 2022
Party	Candidate	Votes	%
Republican	Cindy Beck (incumbent)	3,980	41.87%
Democratic–NPL	Alisa Mitskog (incumbent)	2,805	29.51%
Republican	Kathy Skroch (incumbent)	2,720	28.62%
Total votes		9,505	100.00%
Republican hold			
Democratic–NPL hold			

=== District 26 ===
General election

North Dakota's 26th House of Representatives District general election, 2022
Party	Candidate	Votes	%
Republican	Jeremy Olson	3,100	54.90%
Republican	Kelby Timmons	2,547	45.10%
Total votes		5,647	100.00%
Republican hold			
Republican hold			

=== District 27 ===
General election

North Dakota's 27th House of Representatives District general election, 2022
Party	Candidate	Votes	%
Republican	Greg Stemen (incumbent)	2,703	29.06%
Republican	Josh Christy	2,614	28.10%
Democratic–NPL	Ruth Anna Buffalo (incumbent)	2,245	24.13%
Democratic–NPL	Thomas R. Casler	1,740	18.71%
Total votes		9,302	100.00%
Republican hold			
Republican gain from Democratic–NPL			

=== District 28 ===
Republican primary

North Dakota's 28th House of Representatives District Republican primary election, 2022
Party	Candidate	Votes	%
Republican	Mike Brandenburg (incumbent)	2,185	32.92%
Republican	Jim Grueneich	1,741	26.23%
Republican	Josh Loegering	1,250	18.83%
Republican	Darcy A. Meier	1,123	16.92%
Republican	Sam Leppert	338	5.09%
Total votes		6,637	100.00%

General election

North Dakota's 28th House of Representatives District general election, 2022
Party	Candidate	Votes	%
Republican	Mike Brandenburg (incumbent)	4,758	43.87%
Republican	Jim Grueneich	4,253	39.22%
Democratic–NPL	Sharon Ulmer	1,834	16.91%
Total votes		10,845	100.00%
Republican hold			
Republican hold			

=== District 29 ===
General election

North Dakota's 29th House of Representatives District general election, 2022
Party	Candidate	Votes	%
Republican	Don Vigesaa (incumbent)	4,662	44.25%
Republican	Craig Headland (incumbent)	4,142	39.31%
Democratic–NPL	Charles Linderman	1,732	16.44%
Total votes		10,536	100.00%
Republican hold			
Republican hold			

=== District 31 ===
Republican primary

North Dakota's 31st House of Representatives District Republican primary election, 2022
Party	Candidate	Votes	%
Republican	Dawson Holle	1,055	34.02%
Republican	Karen Rohr (incumbent)	1,049	33.83%
Republican	Jim Schmidt (incumbent)	997	32.15%
Total votes		3,101	100.00%

General election

North Dakota's 31st House of Representatives District general election, 2022
Party	Candidate	Votes	%
Republican	Karen Rohr (incumbent)	3,374	42.19%
Republican	Dawson Holle	3,264	40.81%
Democratic–NPL	Mike Faith	1,360	17.00%
Total votes		7,998	100.00%
Republican hold			
Republican hold			

=== District 33 ===
Republican primary

North Dakota's 33rd House of Representatives District Republican primary election, 2022
Party	Candidate	Votes	%
Republican	Anna Novak	1,994	25.12%
Republican	Bill Tveit (incumbent)	1,879	23.67%
Republican	Jeff Delzer (incumbent)	1,730	21.79%
Republican	Mark L. Pierce	1,727	21.75%
Republican	Andrew Zachmeier	609	7.67%
Total votes		7,939	100.00%

General election

North Dakota's 33rd House of Representatives District general election, 2022
Party	Candidate	Votes	%
Republican	Anna Novak	5,386	51.42%
Republican	Bill Tveit (incumbent)	5,089	48.58%
Total votes		10,475	100.00%
Republican hold			
Republican hold			

=== District 35 ===
General election

North Dakota's 35th House of Representatives District general election, 2022
Party	Candidate	Votes	%
Republican	Bob Martinson (incumbent)	3,528	31.32%
Republican	Karen Karls (incumbent)	3,375	29.96%
Democratic–NPL	Kris Mount	2,194	19.48%
Democratic–NPL	Don Morrison	2,167	19.24%
Total votes		11,264	100.00%
Republican hold			
Republican hold			

=== District 36 ===
General election

North Dakota's 36th House of Representatives District general election, 2022
Party	Candidate	Votes	%
Republican	Dori Hauck (incumbent)	3,148	53.37%
Republican	Gary Kreidt (incumbent)	2,750	46.63%
Total votes		5,898	100.00%
Republican hold			
Republican hold			

=== District 37 ===
General election

North Dakota's 37th House of Representatives District general election, 2022
Party	Candidate	Votes	%
Republican	Mike Lefor (incumbent)	3,091	51.90%
Republican	Vicky Steiner (incumbent)	2,865	48.10%
Total votes		5,956	100.00%
Republican hold			
Republican hold			

=== District 39 ===
Republican primary

North Dakota's 39th House of Representatives District Republican primary election, 2022
Party	Candidate	Votes	%
Republican	Mike Schatz (incumbent)	1,696	26.35%
Republican	Keith Kempenich (incumbent)	1,415	21.99%
Republican	Lyn James	1,322	20.54%
Republican	Thea Lee	1,077	16.73%
Republican	John Pretzer	926	14.39%
Total votes		6,436	100.00%

General election

North Dakota's 39th House of Representatives District general election, 2022
Party	Candidate	Votes	%
Republican	Mike Schatz (incumbent)	4,628	52.52%
Republican	Keith Kempenich (incumbent)	4,184	47.48%
Total votes		8,812	100.00%
Republican hold			
Republican hold			

=== District 41 ===
General election

North Dakota's 41st House of Representatives District general election, 2022
Party	Candidate	Votes	%
Republican	Michelle Strinden (incumbent)	3,219	30.94%
Republican	Jorin James Johnson	2,813	27.04%
Democratic–NPL	Megan Edwardson	2,281	21.92%
Democratic–NPL	Lillian Jones	2,091	20.10%
Total votes		10,404	100.00%
Republican hold			
Republican gain from Democratic–NPL			

=== District 43 ===
General election

North Dakota's 43rd House of Representatives District general election, 2022
Party	Candidate	Votes	%
Republican	Eric J. Murphy	1,756	25.96%
Democratic–NPL	Zachary Ista (incumbent)	1,716	25.37%
Democratic–NPL	Mary Adams (incumbent)	1,712	25.31%
Republican	Ethan Harsell	1,580	23.36%
Total votes		6,764	100.00%
Republican gain from Democratic–NPL			
Democratic–NPL hold			

=== District 44 ===
General election

North Dakota's 44th House of Representatives District general election, 2022
Party	Candidate	Votes	%
Democratic–NPL	Karla Rose Hanson (incumbent)	2,547	38.21%
Democratic–NPL	Joshua Boschee (incumbent)	2,515	37.73%
Republican	Gwendorlene Chea Altenburg	1,604	24.06%
Total votes		6,666	100.00%
Democratic–NPL hold			
Democratic–NPL hold			

=== District 45 ===
General election

North Dakota's 45th House of Representatives District general election, 2022
Party	Candidate	Votes	%
Republican	Carrie McLeod	3,330	50.42%
Republican	Scott Wagner	3,275	49.58%
Total votes		6,605	100.00%
Republican hold			
Republican hold			

=== District 47 ===
Republican primary

North Dakota's 47th House of Representatives District Republican primary election, 2022
Party	Candidate	Votes	%
Republican	Lawrence R. (Larry) Klemin (incumbent)	1,508	35.90%
Republican	Mike Motschenbacher	1,473	35.06%
Republican	Kevin Strege	873	20.78%
Republican	Dean R. Summers	347	8.26%
Total votes		4,201	100.00%

General election

North Dakota's 47th House of Representatives District general election, 2022
Party	Candidate	Votes	%
Republican	Lawrence R. (Larry) Klemin (incumbent)	4,775	50.23%
Republican	Mike Motschenbacher	4,732	49.77%
Total votes		9,507	100.00%
Republican hold			
Republican hold			
