= 69th Legislative Assembly of North Dakota =

←	68th Legislative Assembly

Overview
- Meeting place: North Dakota State Capitol
- Term: January 7, 2025 – January 4, 2027
- Election: 2024 North Dakota House of Representatives election 2024 North Dakota Senate election
- Website: www.ndlegis.gov

North Dakota Senate
- Members: 47 Senators
- President: Michelle Strinden (R)
- President pro tempore: Kyle Davison (R)
- Majority Leader: David Hogue (R)
- Minority Leader: Kathy Hogan (D)
- Party control: North Dakota Republican Party

North Dakota House of Representatives
- Members: 94 Representatives
- Speaker: Robin Weisz (R)
- Majority Leader: Mike Lefor (R)
- Minority Leader: Zac Ista (D)
- Party control: North Dakota Republican Party

Sessions
- 1st: January 7, 2025 – May 3, 2025

The 69th Legislative Assembly of North Dakota is the most recent legislative session of the North Dakota Legislative Assembly. It convened on January 7, 2025, and adjourned on May 3, 2025.

== House of Representatives ==
=== Officers ===
Position	Name	Party	District
Speaker of the House	Robin Weisz	Republican	14
Majority Leader	Mike Lefor	Republican	37
Assistant Majority Leader	Glenn Bosch	Republican	30
Majority Caucus Chair	Jeremy Olson	Republican	26
Minority Leader	Zachary Ista	Democratic–NPL	43
Assistant Minority Leader	Gretchen Dobervich	Democratic–NPL	11
Minority Caucus Chair	Jayme Davis	Democratic–NPL	9

=== Members ===
District	Name	Party	Residence	Start	Term Limited
1	Patrick Hatlestad	Republican	Williston	2006	No
1	David Richter	Republican	Williston	2018	No
2	Bert Anderson	Republican	Crosby	2014 (Note: Originally appointed.)	No
2	Donald Longmuir	Republican	Stanley	2016	No
3	Jeff Hoverson	Republican	Minot	2018	No
3	Lori VanWinkle	Republican	Minot	2022	No
4A	Lisa Finley-DeVille	Democratic-NPL	New Town	2022	No
4B	Clayton Fegley	Republican	Berthold	2018	No
5	Jay Fisher	Republican	Minot	2018	No
5	Scott Louser	Republican	Minot	2010	No
6	Dick Anderson	Republican	Willow City	2010	No
6	Daniel R. Vollmer	Republican	Willow City	2024	No
7	Jason Dockter	Republican	Bismarck	2012	No
7	Matt Heilman	Republican	Bismarck	2022	No
8	Mike Berg	Republican	Bismarck	2024	No
8	SuAnn Olson	Republican	Baldwin	2022	No
9	Collette Brown	Democratic-NPL	Warwick	2024	No
9	Jayme Davis	Democratic-NPL	Rolette	2022 (Note: Davis represented District 9A prior from 2022–2024.)	No
10	Jared Hendrix	Republican	West Fargo	2024	No
10	Steve Swiontek (Note: Swiontek previously served in the state house from 1976–1984.)	Republican	Fargo	2022	No
11	Gretchen Dobervich	Democratic-NPL	Fargo	2016	No
11	Adam Goldwyn	Democratic-NPL	Fargo	2026	No
12	Mitch Ostlie	Republican	Jamestown	2020	No
12	Bernie Satrom	Republican	Jamestown	2016	No
13	Jim Jonas	Republican	West Fargo	2022	No
13	Austen Schauer	Republican	West Fargo	2018	No
14	Jon Nelson	Republican	Rugby	1996	No
14	Robin Weisz	Republican	Hurdsfield	1996	No
15	Kathy Frelich	Republican	Devils Lake	2022	No
15	Donna Henderson	Republican	Calvin	2022 (Note: Henderson represented District 9B from 2022–2024.)	No
16	Ben Koppelman	Republican	West Fargo	2012	No
16	Andrew Marschall	Republican	Fargo	2016	No
17	Landon Bahl	Republican	Grand Forks	2022	No
17	Mark Sanford	Republican	Grand Forks	2010	No
18	Nels Christianson	Republican	Grand Forks	2024	No
18	Steve Vetter	Republican	Grand Forks	2016	No
19	Karen Anderson	Republican	Grafton	2022	No
19	David Monson	Republican	Osnabrock	1992 (Note: Monson represented District 10 from 1992–2022.)	No
20	Mike Beltz	Republican	Hillsboro	2020	No
20	Dave Rustebakke	Republican	Larimore	2026	No
21	LaurieBeth Hager	Democratic-NPL	Fargo	2018	No
21	Mary Schneider	Democratic-NPL	Fargo	2014	No
22	Brandy Pyle	Republican	Casselton	2016	No
22	Jonathan Warrey	Republican	Casselton	2022	No
23	Dennis Nehring	Republican	Williston	2024	No
23	Nico Rios	Republican	Williston	2022	No
24	Daniel Johnston (Note: Johnston previously served in the state house from 2017–2020.)	Republican	Kathryn	2024	No
24	Dwight Kiefert	Republican	Valley City	2012	No
25	Alisa Mitskog	Democratic-NPL	Wahpeton	2014	No
25	Kathy Skroch (Note: Skroch previously served in the state house from 2016–2022.)	Republican	Lidgerwood	2025	No
26	Roger A. Maki	Republican	Watford City	2024	No
26	Kelby Timmons (Note: Timmons previously served in the state house from 2022–2024.)	Republican	Watford City	2025	No
27	Timothy Brown	Republican	Fargo	2025	No
27	Greg Stemen	Republican	Fargo	2020	No
28	Michael Brandenburg (Note: Brandenburg previously served in the state house from 1998–2002.)	Republican	Edgeley	2004	No
28	Jim Grueneich (Note: Grueneich previously served in the state house from 2016–2020.)	Republican	Ellendale	2022	No
29	Craig Headland	Republican	Montpelier	2002	No
29	Don Vigesaa	Republican	Cooperstown	2002 (Note: Vigesaa represented District 23 from 2002–2022.)	No
30	Glenn Bosch	Republican	Bismarck	2016	No
30	Mike Nathe	Republican	Bismarck	2008	No
31	Dawson Holle	Republican	Mandan	2022	No
31	Karen Rohr	Republican	Mott	2010	No
32	Pat Heinert	Republican	Bismarck	2016	No
32	Lisa Meier	Republican	Bismarck	2008	No
33	Anna Novak	Republican	Hazen	2022	No
33	Bill Tveit	Republican	Hazen	2018	No
34	Todd Porter	Republican	Mandan	1998	No
34	Nathan Toman	Republican	Mandan	2012	No
35	Karen Karls	Republican	Bismarck	2006	No
35	Bob Martinson (Note: Martinson previously served in the state house from 1972–1996.)	Republican	Bismarck	2000	No
36	Ty Dressler	Republican	Richardton	2024	No
36	Dori Hauck	Republican	Hebron	2021	No
37	Mike Lefor	Republican	Dickinson	2014	No
37	Vicky Steiner	Republican	Dickinson	2010	No
38	Dan Ruby	Republican	Minot	2000	No
38	Christina Wolff	Republican	Minot	2024	No
39	Keith Kempenich	Republican	Bowman	1992	No
39	Mike Schatz	Republican	New England	2008 (Note: Schatz represented District 36 from 2008–2022.)	No
40	Macy Bolinske	Republican	Minot	2024	No
40	Matthew Ruby	Republican	Minot	2016	No
41	Karen Grindberg	Republican	Fargo	2024	No
41	Jorin Johnson	Republican	Fargo	2022	No
42	Dustin McNally	Republican	Grand Forks	2025	No
42	Doug Osowski	Republican	Grand Forks	2024	No
43	Zachary Ista	Democratic-NPL	Grand Forks	2020	No
43	Eric Murphy	Republican	Grand Forks	2022	No
44	Austin Foss	Democratic-NPL	Fargo	2024	No
44	Karla Hanson	Democratic-NPL	Fargo	2016	No
45	Carrie McLeod	Republican	Fargo	2022	No
45	Scott Wagner	Republican	Fargo	2022	No
46	Jim Kasper	Republican	Fargo	2000	No
46	Desiree Morton	Republican	Fargo	2024	No
47	Lawrence Klemin	Republican	Bismarck	1998	No
47	Mike Motschenbacher	Republican	Bismarck	2022	No

== Senators ==
=== Officers ===
Position	Name	Party	District
President Pro Tempore of the Senate	Kyle Davison	Republican	41
Majority leader	David Hogue	Republican	38
Assistant Majority leader	Jerry Klein	Republican	14
Majority Caucus chair	Kristin Roers	Republican	27
Minority leader	Kathy Hogan	Democratic-NPL	21
Assistant Minority leader	Vacant	Democratic-NPL	
Minority Caucus chair	Ryan Braunberger	Democratic-NPL	10

=== Members ===
District	Name	Party	Residence	Start	Next Election
1	Brad Bekkedahl	Rep	Williston	2014	2026
2	Mark Enget	Rep	Powers Lake	2024	2028
3	Bob Paulson	Rep	Minot	2022	2026
4	Chuck Walen	Rep	New Town	2024	2028
5	Randy Burckhard	Rep	Minot	2010	2026
6	Paul Thomas	Rep	Velva	2024	2028
7	Michelle Axtman	Rep	Bismarck	2022	2026
8	Jeffery Magrum	Rep	Hazelton	2022	2028
9	Richard Marcellais	Dem-NPL	Belcourt	2024 (special)	2026
10	Ryan Braunberger	Dem-NPL	Fargo	2022	2028
11	Tim Mathern	Dem-NPL	Fargo	1986	2026
12	Cole Conley	Rep	Jamestown	2020	2028
13	Judy Lee	Rep	West Fargo	1994	2026
14	Jerry Klein	Rep	Fessenden	1996	2028
15	Kent Weston	Rep	Sarles	2022 (Note: Represented District 9 prior to 2024)	2026
16	David Clemens	Rep	West Fargo	2016	2028
17	Jonathan Sickler	Rep	Grand Forks	2022	2026
18	Scott Meyer	Rep	Grand Forks	2016	2028
19	Janne Myrdal	Rep	Edinburg	2016 (Note: Represented District 10 prior to 2022)	2026
20	Randy Lemm	Rep	Hillsboro	2018	2028
21	Kathy Hogan	Dem-NPL	Fargo	2018	2026
22	Mark Weber	Rep	Casselton	2020	2028
23	Todd Beard	Rep	Williston	2022	2026
24	Michael Wobbema	Rep	Valley City	2020	2028
25	Larry Luick	Rep	Fairmount	2010	2026
26	Dale Patten	Rep	Watford City	2018 (Note: Represented District 39 prior to 2022)	2028
27	Kristin Roers	Rep	Fargo	2018	2026
28	Robert Erbele	Rep	Lehr	2000	2028
29	Terry Wanzek	Rep	Jamestown	1994	2026
30	Diane Larson	Rep	Bismarck	2016	2028
31	Donald Schaible	Rep	Mott	2010	2026
32	Dick Dever	Rep	Bismarck	2008	2028
33	Keith Boehm	Rep	Mandan	2022	2026
34	Justin Gerhardt	Rep	Mandan	2023	2028
35	Sean Cleary	Rep	Bismarck	2022	2026
36	Desiree Van Oosting	Rep	Judson	2024	2028
37	Dean Rummel	Rep	Dickinson	2022	2026
38	David Hogue	Rep	Minot	2008	2028
39	Greg Kessel	Rep	Belfield	2022	2026
40	Jose L. Castaneda	Rep	Minot	2024	2028
41	Kyle Davison	Rep	Fargo	2014	2026
42	Claire Cory	Rep	Grand Forks	2024	2028
43	Jeff Barta	Rep	Grand Forks	2022	2026
44	Jamie Selzler	Dem-NPL	Fargo	2026	2028
45	Ronald Sorvaag	Rep	Fargo	2010	2026
46	Michelle Powers	Rep	Fargo	2024	2028
47	Michael Dwyer	Rep	Bismarck	2018	2026
