= 2026 North Dakota House of Representatives election =

- November 3, 2026

46 of the 94 seats in the North Dakota House of Representatives 48 seats needed for a majority
Leader	Robin Weisz	Zac Ista
Party	Republican	Democratic–NPL
Leader's seat	14th	43rd
Current seats	83	11
- Status of the incumbents: Republican incumbent retiring Republican incumbent Democratic–NPL incumbent retiring Democratic–NPL incumbent No election Multi-member districts: Two Republicans retiring Two Republicans; Split delegation Two Democratic–NPLers
Incumbent Speaker
Robin Weisz
Republican

The 2026 North Dakota House of Representatives election was held on November 3, 2026, alongside the other 2026 United States elections. Voters elected half the members of the North Dakota House of Representatives to serve a four-year term.

== Predictions ==
Source	Ranking	As of
Sabato's Crystal Ball	Safe R	January 22, 2026

== Partisan background ==
In the 2024 U.S. presidential election, Republican Donald Trump won the most votes in 42 of North Dakota's state senate districts and Democratic–NPL nominee Kamala Harris won 5. Out of the 24 odd-numbered districts up for election in 2026, Trump won the most votes in twenty-one, and Harris won the most votes in three. The North Dakota Secretary of State did not specify individual statewide election results for subdistricts 4A and 4B, which returned a Democratic–NPLer and a Republican in 2022, respectively. Outside of District 4, two Democratic–NPLers represent a district Trump won in 2024: Alisa Mitskog of District 25 (Trump +37.65%) and Zac Ista of District 43 (Trump +6.24%).

Harris (D-NPL) 40–50% 50–60% / Trump (R) 50–60% 60–70% 70–80% 80–90%

== Summary of results by district ==
District	Incumbent	Party	Elected Representative	Outcome
1st	Patrick Hatlestad	Rep	Laurie Garbel	
1st	David Richter	Rep	TBD	
3rd	Jeff Hoverson	Rep	Blaine DesLauriers	
3rd	Lori VanWinkle	Rep	Timothy Mihalick	
5th	Jay Fisher	Rep	Roger Brabandt	
5th	Scott Louser	Rep	TBD	
7th	Jason Dockter	Rep	Steve Sauter	
7th	Matthew Heilman	Rep	Greg Vetter	
9th	Collette Brown	Dem–NPL	TBD	
9th	Jayme Davis	Dem–NPL	Duane Poitra	
11th	Vacant (Note: Liz Conmy died on April 25, 2026)	Dem–NPL	Anastassiya Andrianova	
11th	Gretchen Dobervich	Dem–NPL	Doug Sharbono	
13th	Jim Jonas	Rep	TBD	
13th	Austen Schauer	Rep	TBD	
15th	Kathy Frelich	Rep	TBD	
15th	Donna Henderson	Rep	Corry Kenner	
17th	Landon Bahl	Rep	Reed Johnson	
17th	Mark Sanford	Rep	TBD	
19th	Karen Anderson	Rep	TBD	
19th	David Monson	Rep	TBD	
21st	LaurieBeth Hager	Dem–NPL	TBD	
21st	Mary Schneider	Dem–NPL	Laura Dronen	
23rd	Dennis Nehring	Rep	TBD	
23rd	Nico Rios	Rep	Corey Johnson	
25th	Alisa Mitskog	Dem–NPL	TBD	
25th	Vacant (Note: Cindy Schreiber-Beck died on May 18, 2025)	Rep	Terry Goerger	
27th	Timothy Brown	Rep	Shawn Kessel	
27th	Greg Stemen	Rep	TBD	
29th	Craig Headland	Rep	TBD	
29th	Don Vigesaa	Rep	Kevin Wolsky	
31st	Dawson Holle	Rep	TBD	
31st	Karen Rohr	Rep	TBD	
33rd	Anna Novak	Rep	TBD	
33rd	Bill Tveit	Rep	Mike Heger	
35th	Karen Karls	Rep	TBD	
35th	Bob Martinson	Rep	TBD	
37th	Mike Lefor	Rep	Kylan Klauzer	
37th	Vicky Steiner	Rep	TBD	
39th	Keith Kempenich	Rep	TBD	
39th	Mike Schatz	Rep	TBD	
41st	Karen Grindberg	Rep	TBD	
41st	Jorin Johnson	Rep	TBD	
43rd	Zac Ista	Dem–NPL	Lukas Maughan	
43rd	Eric James Murphy	Rep	Tyler York	
45th	Carrie McLeod	Rep	TBD	
45th	Scott Wagner	Rep	TBD	
47th	Lawrence Klemin	Rep	Jon Lee	
47th	Mike Motschenbacher	Rep	TBD	

== District 1 ==
The 1st district is represented by Republicans Patrick Hatlestad and David Richter.

=== Republican primary ===
==== Results ====
District 1 election, Republican primary 2 to be nominated
Party	Candidate	Votes	%
Republican	Nicole Derenne	1,205	50.42
Republican	Laurie Garbel	1,176	49.21
Write-in		9	0.38
Total votes		2,390	100.00

=== Democratic–NPL primary ===
==== Results ====
District 1 election, Democratic–NPL primary 2 to be nominated
Party	Candidate	Votes	%
Democratic–NPL	Alex Johnson	309	53.18
Democratic–NPL	Steve Thoring	271	46.64
Write-in		1	0.17
Total votes		581	100.00

== District 3 ==
The 3rd district is represented by Republicans Jeff Hoverson and Lori VanWinkle.

=== Republican primary ===
==== Results ====
District 3 election, Republican primary 2 to be nominated
Party	Candidate	Votes	%
Republican	Blaine DesLauriers	706	26.35
Republican	Timothy Mihalick	686	25.61
Republican	Jeff Hoverson	663	24.75
Republican	Crystal Hendrickson	622	23.22
Write-in		2	0.07
Total votes		2,679	100.00

=== Democratic–NPL primary ===
==== Results ====
District 3 election, Democratic–NPL primary 2 to be nominated
Party	Candidate	Votes	%
Democratic–NPL	Tara Hiatt	359	50.07
Democratic–NPL	Natalie Mclaughlin	356	49.65
Write-in		2	0.28
Total votes		717	100.00

== District 5 ==
The 5th district is represented by Republicans Jay Fisher and Scott Louser.

=== Republican primary ===
==== Results ====
District 5 election, Republican primary 2 to be nominated
Party	Candidate	Votes	%
Republican	Scott Louser	1,428	53.44
Republican	Roger Brabandt	1,237	46.29
Write-in		7	0.26
Total votes		2,672	100.00

=== Democratic–NPL primary ===
==== Results ====
District 5 election, Democratic–NPL primary 2 to be nominated
Party	Candidate	Votes	%
Democratic–NPL	Kyle Erickson	530	50.19
Democratic–NPL	Zach Raknerud	526	49.81
Write-in		0	0.00
Total votes		1,056	100.00

== District 7 ==
The 7th district is represented by Republicans Jason Dockter and Matthew Heilman.

=== Republican primary ===
==== Results ====
District 7 election, Republican primary 2 to be nominated
Party	Candidate	Votes	%
Republican	Greg Vetter	1,608	31.41
Republican	Steve Sauter	1,433	27.99
Republican	Rick Becker	1,151	22.48
Republican	Gaylynn Becker	915	17.87
Write-in		12	0.23
Total votes		5,119	100.00

=== Democratic–NPL primary ===
==== Results ====
District 7 election, Democratic–NPL primary 2 to be nominated
Party	Candidate	Votes	%
Democratic–NPL	Tiffany Williams-Rice	622	51.53
Democratic–NPL	Jason Thoms	584	48.38
Write-in		1	0.08
Total votes		1,207	100.00

== District 9 ==
The 9th district is represented by Democrats Collette Brown and Jayme Davis.

=== Democratic–NPL primary ===
==== Candidates ====
===== Nominee =====
- Collette Brown, incumbent state representative
- Duane Poitra

===== Declined =====
- Jayme Davis, incumbent state representative (running for state senate)

==== Results ====
District 9 election, Democratic–NPL primary 2 to be nominated
Party	Candidate	Votes	%
Democratic–NPL	Duane Poitra	695	53.83
Democratic–NPL	Collette Brown (incumbent)	591	45.78
Write-in		5	0.39
Total votes		1,291	100.00

=== Republican primary ===
==== Results ====
District 9 election, Republican primary 2 to be nominated
Party	Candidate	Votes	%
	Write-in	42	100.00
Total votes		42	100.00

== District 11 ==
The 11th district previously elected Democrats Liz Conmy and Gretchen Dobervich. Conmy died in a plane crash on April 25, 2026 but will still appear on the ballot, and Dobervich is not running for reelection.

=== Democratic–NPL primary ===
==== Candidates ====
===== Nominee =====
- Stass Andrianova, North Dakota State University professor

===== Declined =====
- Gretchen Dobervich, incumbent state representative

===== Deceased =====
- Liz Conmy, incumbent state representative (will still appear on ballot)

==== Results ====
District 11 election, Democratic–NPL primary 2 to be nominated
Party	Candidate	Votes	%
Democratic–NPL	Stass Andrianova	1,444	50.33
Democratic–NPL	Liz Conmy (incumbent) †	1,407	49.04
Write-in		18	0.63
Total votes		2,869	100.00

=== Republican primary ===
==== Results ====
District 11 election, Republican primary 2 to be nominated
Party	Candidate	Votes	%
	Write-in	367	100.00
Total votes		367	100.00

== District 13 ==
The 13th district is represented by Republicans Jim Jonas and Austen Schauer.

=== Republican primary ===
==== Results ====
District 13 election, Republican primary 2 to be nominated
Party	Candidate	Votes	%
Republican	Austen Schauer	938	32.24
Republican	Jim Jonas	915	31.45
Republican	Russell Bubach	532	18.29
Republican	Everett Duckworth	524	18.01
Write-in		0	0.00
Total votes		2,909	100.00

=== Democratic–NPL primary ===
==== Results ====
District 13 election, Democratic–NPL primary 2 to be nominated
Party	Candidate	Votes	%
Democratic–NPL	Maggi Gadaire	737	50.97
Democratic–NPL	Brenda Jo Gillund	709	49.03
Write-in		0	0.00
Total votes		1,446	100.00

== District 15 ==
The 15th district is represented by Republicans Kathy Frelich and Donna Henderson.

=== Republican primary ===
==== Results ====
District 15 election, Republican primary 2 to be nominated
Party	Candidate	Votes	%
Republican	Kathy Frelich	1,936	39.08
Republican	Corry Kenner	1,677	33.85
Republican	Donna Henderson	1,340	27.05
Write-in		1	0.02
Total votes		4,954	100.00

=== Democratic–NPL primary ===
==== Results ====
District 15 election, Democratic–NPL primary 2 to be nominated
Party	Candidate	Votes	%
Democratic–NPL	Frances Drury	631	99.21
Write-in		5	0.79
Total votes		636	100.00

== District 17 ==
The 17th district is represented by Republicans Landon Bahl and Mark Sanford.

=== Republican primary ===
==== Results ====
District 17 election, Republican primary 2 to be nominated
Party	Candidate	Votes	%
Republican	Mark Sanford	981	56.38
Republican	Reed Johnson	755	43.39
Write-in		4	0.23
Total votes		1,740	100.00

=== Democratic–NPL primary ===
==== Results ====
District 17 election, Democratic–NPL primary 2 to be nominated
Party	Candidate	Votes	%
Democratic–NPL	Don Aandal	810	99.26
Write-in		8	0.74
Total votes		818	100.00

== District 19 ==
The 19th district is represented by Republicans Karen Anderson and David Monson.

=== Republican primary ===
==== Results ====
District 19 election, Republican primary 2 to be nominated
Party	Candidate	Votes	%
Republican	Karen A Anderson	2,064	50.75
Republican	David Monson	1,972	48.49
Write-in		31	0.76
Total votes		4,067	100.00

=== Democratic–NPL primary ===
==== Results ====
District 19 election, Democratic–NPL primary 2 to be nominated
Party	Candidate	Votes	%
Democratic–NPL	Jolene L Hermanson	778	51.80
Democratic–NPL	Lynnell Popowski	723	48.14
Write-in		1	0.07
Total votes		1,502	100.00

== District 21 ==
The 21st district is represented by Democrats LaurieBeth Hager and Mary Schneider.

=== Democratic–NPL primary ===
==== Results ====
District 21 election, Democratic–NPL primary 2 to be nominated
Party	Candidate	Votes	%
Democratic–NPL	LaurieBeth Hager	1,159	50.22
Democratic–NPL	Laura Dronen	1,147	49.70
Write-in		2	0.09
Total votes		2,308	100.00

=== Republican primary ===
==== Results ====
District 21 election, Republican primary 2 to be nominated
Party	Candidate	Votes	%
	Write-in	116	100.00
Total votes		116	100.00

== District 23 ==
The 23rd district is represented by Republicans Dennis Nehring and Nico Rios.

=== Republican primary ===
==== Results ====
District 23 election, Republican primary 2 to be nominated
Party	Candidate	Votes	%
Republican	Corey Johnson	504	43.15
Republican	Dennis Nehring	384	32.88
Republican	Sharlet Mohr	269	23.03
Write-in		11	0.94
Total votes		1,168	100.00

=== Democratic–NPL primary ===
==== Results ====
District 23 election, Democratic–NPL primary 2 to be nominated
Party	Candidate	Votes	%
Democratic–NPL	Mark Casler	103	51.24
Democratic–NPL	Michael A Steele	97	48.26
Write-in		1	0.50
Total votes		201	100.00

== District 25 ==
The 25th district is represented by Democrat Alisa Mitskog and Republican Kathy Skroch.

=== Democratic–NPL primary ===
==== Candidates ====
===== Declared =====
- Alisa Mitskog, incumbent state representative

==== Results ====
District 25 election, Democratic–NPL primary 2 to be nominated
Party	Candidate	Votes	%
Democratic–NPL	Alisa Mitskog	590	99.16
Write-in		5	0.84
Total votes		595	100.00

=== Republican primary ===
==== Results ====
District 25 election, Republican primary 2 to be nominated
Party	Candidate	Votes	%
Republican	Terry Goerger	1,407	44.79
Republican	Kathy Skroch	1,001	31.87
Republican	Matt Evans	727	23.15
Write-in		6	0.19
Total votes		3,141	100.00

== District 26 (unexpired term) ==
=== Republican primary ===
==== Candidates ====
===== Declared =====
- Brent Schwan

==== Results ====
District 26 election, Republican primary 1 to be nominated
Party	Candidate	Votes	%
Republican	Brent Schwan	1,816	99.78
Write-in		4	0.22
Total votes		1,820	100.00

=== Democratic–NPL primary ===
==== Results ====
District 25 election, Democratic–NPL primary 2 to be nominated
Party	Candidate	Votes	%
	Write-in	28	100.00
Total votes		28	100.00

== District 27 ==
The 27th district is represented by Republicans Timothy Brown and Greg Stemen.

=== Republican primary ===
==== Results ====
District 27 election, Republican primary 2 to be nominated
Party	Candidate	Votes	%
Republican	Shawn Kessel	957	43.09
Republican	Greg Stemen	883	39.76
Republican	Grant Allex	368	16.57
Write-in		13	0.59
Total votes		2,221	100.00

=== Democratic–NPL primary ===
==== Results ====
District 27 election, Democratic–NPL primary 2 to be nominated
Party	Candidate	Votes	%
	Write-in	284	100.00
Total votes		284	100.00

== District 29 ==
The 29th district is represented by Republicans Craig Headland and Don Vigesaa.

=== Republican primary ===
==== Results ====
District 29 election, Republican primary 2 to be nominated
Party	Candidate	Votes	%
Republican	Kevin Wolsky	1,661	51.38
Republican	Craig Headland	1,543	47.73
Write-in		29	0.90
Total votes		3,233	100.00

=== Democratic–NPL primary ===
==== Results ====
District 29 election, Democratic–NPL primary 2 to be nominated
Party	Candidate	Votes	%
Democratic–NPL	Dianne Norris	828	99.28
Write-in		6	0.72
Total votes		834	100.00

== District 31 ==
The 31st district is represented by Republicans Dawson Holle and Karen Rohr.

=== Republican primary ===
==== Results ====
District 31 election, Republican primary 2 to be nominated
Party	Candidate	Votes	%
Republican	Dawson Holle		
Republican	Karen Rohr		
Republican	Jim Schmidt		
Republican	Kevin K Remington		
Write-in			

=== Democratic–NPL primary ===
==== Results ====
District 31 election, Democratic–NPL primary 2 to be nominated
Party	Candidate	Votes	%
Democratic–NPL	Tim Spilman		
Democratic–NPL	Rissa M Williams		
Write-in			

== District 33 ==
The 33rd district is represented by Republicans Anna Novak and Bill Tveit.

=== Republican primary ===
==== Results ====
District 33 election, Republican primary 2 to be nominated
Party	Candidate	Votes	%
Republican	Anna S (Garrett) Novak		
Republican	Mike Heger		
Republican	Bill Tveit		
Republican	Jesus Albry Aguirre		
Write-in			

=== Democratic–NPL primary ===
==== Results ====
District 33 election, Democratic–NPL primary 2 to be nominated
Party	Candidate	Votes	%
Democratic–NPL	Kimball Banks		
Democratic–NPL	Stacie Kruckenberg		
Write-in			

== District 35 ==
The 35th district is represented by Republicans Karen Karls and Bob Martinson.

=== Republican primary ===
==== Results ====
District 35 election, Republican primary 2 to be nominated
Party	Candidate	Votes	%
Republican	Bill Tveit		
Republican	Karen Karls		
Write-in			

=== Democratic–NPL primary ===
==== Results ====
District 35 election, Democratic–NPL primary 2 to be nominated
Party	Candidate	Votes	%
Democratic–NPL	Taylor Johnson		
Democratic–NPL	Lynne M Lafer-Halvorson		
Write-in			

== District 37 ==
The 37th district is represented by Republicans Mike Lefor and Vicky Steiner.

=== Republican primary ===
==== Results ====
District 37 election, Republican primary 2 to be nominated
Party	Candidate	Votes	%
Republican	Bob Martinson		
Republican	Kylan Klauzer		
Write-in			

=== Democratic–NPL primary ===
==== Results ====
District 37 election, Democratic–NPL primary 2 to be nominated
Party	Candidate	Votes	%
Democratic–NPL	Susan Josephson		
Democratic–NPL	Shelley Lenz		
Write-in			

== District 39 ==
The 39th district is represented by Republicans Keith Kempenich and Mike Schatz.

=== Republican primary ===
==== Results ====
District 39 election, Republican primary 2 to be nominated
Party	Candidate	Votes	%
Republican	Mike Schatz		
Republican	Keith Kempenich		
Republican	Jason Dodge		
Write-in			

=== Democratic–NPL primary ===
==== Results ====
District 39 election, Democratic–NPL primary 2 to be nominated
Party	Candidate	Votes	%
Democratic–NPL	Sandy Baertsch		
Write-in			

== District 41 ==
The 41st district is represented by Republicans Karen Grindberg and Jorin Johnson.

=== Republican primary ===
==== Results ====
District 41 election, Republican primary 2 to be nominated
Party	Candidate	Votes	%
Republican	Mike Schatz		
Republican	Jennifer Benson		
Write-in			

=== Democratic–NPL primary ===
==== Results ====
District 41 election, Democratic–NPL primary 2 to be nominated
Party	Candidate	Votes	%
Democratic–NPL	Stacy Heidenreich		
Democratic–NPL	Chris Tiongson		
Write-in			

== District 42 (unexpired term) ==
Republican Dustin McNally, who was appointed to fill the vacancy caused by the resignation of Emily O'Brien, must face re-election to a 2-year term as O'Brien was re-elected in 2024.

=== Republican primary ===
==== Results ====
District 42 election, Republican primary 1 to be nominated
Party	Candidate	Votes	%
Republican	Connie Osowski		
Republican	Dustin McNally		
Republican	Ethan Harsell		
Write-in			

=== Democratic–NPL primary ===
==== Results ====
District 41 election, Democratic–NPL primary 1 to be nominated
Party	Candidate	Votes	%
Democratic–NPL	Nicole Derenne		
Write-in			

== District 43 ==
The 43rd district is represented by Democrat Zac Ista and Republican Eric James Murphy.

=== Democratic–NPL primary ===
==== Results ====
District 43 election, Democratic–NPL primary 2 to be nominated
Party	Candidate	Votes	%
Democratic–NPL	Lukas Arthur Maughan		
Democratic–NPL	Tyler York		
Write-in			

=== Republican primary ===
==== Results ====
District 43 election, Republican primary 2 to be nominated
Party	Candidate	Votes	%
Republican	Jill T Chandler		
Republican	Mike Holmes		
Republican	Eric J Murphy		
Write-in			

== District 45 ==
The 45th district is represented by Republicans Carrie McLeod and Scott Wagner.

=== Republican primary ===
==== Results ====
District 45 election, Republican primary 2 to be nominated
Party	Candidate	Votes	%
Republican	Eric J Murphy		
Republican	Carrie McLeod		
Write-in			

=== Democratic–NPL primary ===
==== Results ====
District 45 election, Democratic–NPL primary 2 to be nominated
Party	Candidate	Votes	%
Democratic–NPL	Don Lippert		
Democratic–NPL	Ross Lockhart		
Write-in			

== District 47 ==
The 47th district is represented by Republicans Lawrence Klemin and Mike Motschenbacher.

=== Republican primary ===
==== Results ====
District 47 election, Republican primary 2 to be nominated
Party	Candidate	Votes	%
Republican	Scott Wagner		
Republican	Jon Lee		
Write-in			

=== Democratic–NPL primary ===
==== Results ====
District 47 election, Democratic–NPL primary 2 to be nominated
Party	Candidate	Votes	%
Democratic–NPL	Rosann Jacobs-Fode		
Democratic–NPL	Cole Montoya		
Write-in			
