= 2020 North Dakota House of Representatives election =

- November 3, 2020

46 out of 94 seats in the North Dakota House of Representatives 46 seats needed for a majority

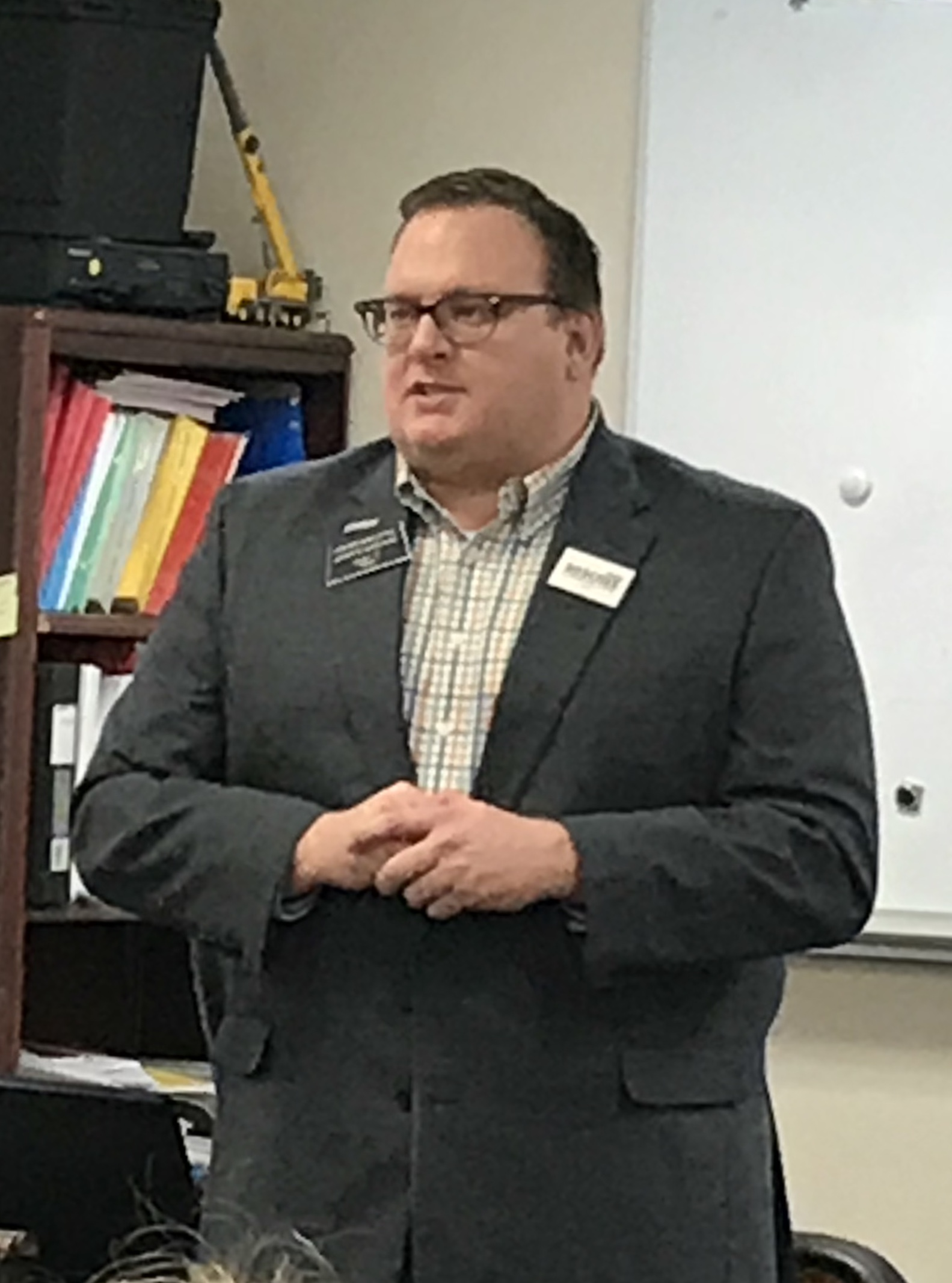
	Majority party	Minority party
Leader	Lawrence Klemin	Joshua Boschee
Party	Republican	Democratic–NPL
Leader's seat	47th District	44th District
Seats before	79	15
Seats after	80	14
Seat change	▲1	▼1
Popular vote	209,433	86,819
Percentage	70.16%	29.09%
- Results: Republican gain Republican hold Democratic-NPL hold No election
Speaker before election
Lawrence Klemin
Republican
Elected Speaker
Lawrence Klemin
Republican

Elections to the North Dakota House of Representatives were held on November 3, 2020. A total of 46 seats out of 94 were up for re-election.

The primary election was held on June 9, 2020.

== Predictions ==
Source	Ranking	As of
The Cook Political Report	Safe R	October 21, 2020

== Results ==
=== District 2 ===
North Dakota House of Representatives District 2 general election
Party	Candidate	Votes	%
Republican	Donald Longmuir (incumbent)	7,501	50.38%
Republican	Bert Anderson (incumbent)	7,260	48.76%
Write-In	Write-in	128	0.86%
Total votes		14,889	100.0%
Republican hold			
Republican hold			

=== District 4 ===
North Dakota House of Representatives District 4 general election
Party	Candidate	Votes	%
Republican	Clayton Fegley (incumbent)	4,325	34.52%
Republican	Terry Jones (incumbent)	3,959	31.60%
Democratic–NPL	Thomasina Mandan	2,283	18.22%
Democratic–NPL	Hunter L Andes	1,953	15.59%
Write-In	Write-in	10	0.08%
Total votes		12,530	100.0%
Republican hold			
Republican hold			

=== District 6 ===
North Dakota House of Representatives District 6 general election
Party	Candidate	Votes	%
Republican	Dick Anderson (incumbent)	5,445	39.51%
Republican	Paul Thomas	5,089	36.93%
Democratic–NPL	Trygve Hammer	1,621	11.76%
Democratic–NPL	Arnold W Langehaug	1,617	11.73%
Write-In	Write-in	8	0.06%
Total votes		13,780	100.0%
Republican hold			
Republican hold			

=== District 8 ===
North Dakota House of Representatives District 8 general election
Party	Candidate	Votes	%
Republican	Dave Nehring (incumbent)	6,794	40.70%
Republican	David Andahl	5,929	35.52%
Democratic–NPL	Kathrin Volochenko	1,905	11.41%
Democratic–NPL	Linda Babb	1,651	9.89%
Write-In	Write-in	412	2.47%
Total votes		16,691	100.0%
Republican hold			
Republican hold			

=== District 10 ===
North Dakota House of Representatives District 10 general election
Party	Candidate	Votes	%
Republican	David Monson (incumbent)	4,815	38.58%
Republican	Chuck Damschen (incumbent)	4,414	35.37%
Democratic–NPL	Elsie Blair Magnus	1,707	13.68%
Democratic–NPL	Melissa Anderson	1,535	12.30%
Write-In	Write-in	9	0.07%
Total votes		12,480	100.0%
Republican hold			
Republican hold			

=== District 12 ===
North Dakota House of Representatives District 12 general election
Party	Candidate	Votes	%
Republican	Bernie Satrom (incumbent)	3,423	31.64%
Republican	Mitch Ostlie	3,321	30.70%
Democratic–NPL	Pam Musland	2,212	20.45%
Democratic–NPL	George Barnes	1,824	16.86%
Write-In	Write-in	38	0.35%
Total votes		10,818	100.0%
Republican hold			
Republican hold			

=== District 14 ===
North Dakota House of Representatives District 14 general election
Party	Candidate	Votes	%
Republican	Jon Nelson (incumbent)	5,491	38.65%
Republican	Robin Weisz (incumbent)	5,419	38.15%
Democratic–NPL	Mark Nelson	1,718	12.09%
Democratic–NPL	Richard Lynne	1,568	11.04%
Write-In	Write-in	10	0.07%
Total votes		14,206	100.0%
Republican hold			
Republican hold			

=== District 16 ===
North Dakota House of Representatives District 16 general election
Party	Candidate	Votes	%
Republican	Ben Koppelman (incumbent)	5,434	29.28%
Republican	Andrew Marschall (incumbent)	4,782	25.77%
Democratic–NPL	Tracey L Wilkie	4,448	23.97%
Democratic–NPL	Hamida Dakane	3,869	20.85%
Write-In	Write-in	23	0.12%
Total votes		18,556	100.0%
Republican hold			
Republican hold			

=== District 18 ===
North Dakota House of Representatives District 18 general election
Party	Candidate	Votes	%
Republican	Steve Vetter (incumbent)	2,744	28.18%
Democratic–NPL	Corey Mock (incumbent)	2,432	24.97%
Republican	Cindy Kaml	2,416	24.81%
Democratic–NPL	Jacqueline Hoffarth	2,136	21.93%
Write-In	Write-in	10	0.10%
Total votes		9,738	100.0%
Republican hold			
Democratic–NPL hold			

=== District 20 ===
North Dakota House of Representatives District 20 general election
Party	Candidate	Votes	%
Republican	Mike Beltz	4,212	34.48%
Republican	Jared Hagert	4,074	33.35%
Democratic–NPL	John Martin Pederson	2,014	16.49%
Democratic–NPL	Zachary Blotsky	1,908	15.62%
Write-In	Write-in	9	0.07%
Total votes		12,217	100.0%
Republican hold			
Republican gain from Democratic–NPL			

=== District 22 ===
North Dakota House of Representatives District 22 general election
Party	Candidate	Votes	%
Republican	Michael Howe (incumbent)	6,829	34.26%
Republican	Brandy Pyle (incumbent)	6,786	34.05%
Democratic–NPL	Jodi Meisch	3,420	17.16%
Democratic–NPL	Will Thompson	2,885	14.47%
Write-In	Write-in	11	0.06%
Total votes		19,931	100.0%
Republican hold			
Republican hold			

=== District 24 ===
North Dakota House of Representatives District 24 general election
Party	Candidate	Votes	%
Republican	Dwight Kiefert (incumbent)	3,733	29.33%
Republican	Cole Christensen	3,605	28.32%
Democratic–NPL	Naomi T Muscha	2,872	22.56%
Democratic–NPL	Bradley Edin	2,509	19.71%
Write-In	Write-in	10	0.08%
Total votes		12,729	100.0%
Republican hold			
Republican hold			

=== District 26 ===
North Dakota House of Representatives District 26 general election
Party	Candidate	Votes	%
Republican	Kathy Skroch (incumbent)	3,944	30.80%
Republican	Sebastian Ertelt (incumbent)	3,465	27.06%
Democratic–NPL	John M Hokana	2,816	21.99%
Democratic–NPL	Alan J Peterson	2,568	20.05%
Write-In	Write-in	13	0.10%
Total votes		12,806	100.0%
Republican hold			
Republican hold			

=== District 28 ===
North Dakota House of Representatives District 28 general election
Party	Candidate	Votes	%
Republican	Jeffery Magrum (incumbent)	5,410	43.85%
Republican	Michael Don Brandenburg (incumbent)	5,159	41.81%
Democratic–NPL	Rebecca Phillips	1,684	13.65%
Write-In	Write-in	85	0.69%
Total votes		12,338	100.0%
Republican hold			
Republican hold			

=== District 30 ===
North Dakota House of Representatives District 30 general election
Party	Candidate	Votes	%
Republican	Glenn Bosch (incumbent)	5,268	49.29%
Republican	Mike Nathe (incumbent)	5,262	49.24%
Write-In	Write-in	157	1.47%
Total votes		10,687	100.0%
Republican hold			
Republican hold			

=== District 32 ===
North Dakota House of Representatives District 32 general election
Party	Candidate	Votes	%
Republican	Pat Heinert (incumbent)	4,189	34.71%
Republican	Lisa Meier (incumbent)	4,136	34.28%
Democratic–NPL	Krisanna Holkup Peterson	1,945	16.12%
Democratic–NPL	Carl Young	1,777	14.73%
Write-In	Write-in	20	0.17%
Total votes		12,067	100.0%
Republican hold			
Republican hold			

=== District 34 ===
North Dakota House of Representatives District 34 general election
Party	Candidate	Votes	%
Republican	Todd Porter (incumbent)	5,520	36.68%
Republican	Nathan Toman (incumbent)	5,397	35.86%
Democratic–NPL	Joshua Johnson	2,157	14.33%
Democratic–NPL	Bernie Parkhurst	1,962	13.04%
Write-In	Write-in	14	0.09%
Total votes		15,050	100.0%
Republican hold			
Republican hold			

=== District 36 ===
North Dakota House of Representatives District 36 general election
Party	Candidate	Votes	%
Republican	Mike Schatz (incumbent)	6,748	41.56%
Republican	Luke Simons (incumbent)	6,273	38.63%
Democratic–NPL	Linda Weiss	1,128	6.95%
Democratic–NPL	Steve Krebs	1,093	6.73%
Independent	Rebecca Ferderer	971	5.98%
Write-In	Write-in	25	0.15%
Total votes		16,238	100.0%
Republican hold			
Republican hold			

=== District 38 ===
North Dakota House of Representatives District 38 general election
Party	Candidate	Votes	%
Republican	Dan Ruby (incumbent)	5,411	50.64%
Republican	Larry Bellew (incumbent)	5,097	47.70%
Write-In	Write-in	177	1.66%
Total votes		10,685	100.0%
Republican hold			
Republican hold			

=== District 40 ===
North Dakota House of Representatives District 40 general election
Party	Candidate	Votes	%
Republican	Matthew Ruby (incumbent)	3,224	36.17%
Republican	Randy Schobinger (incumbent)	2,948	33.08%
Democratic–NPL	Kalyn June Dewitt	1,413	15.85%
Democratic–NPL	Robert E Kibler	1,314	14.74%
Write-In	Write-in	14	0.16%
Total votes		8,913	100.0%
Republican hold			
Republican hold			

=== District 42 ===
North Dakota House of Representatives District 42 general election
Party	Candidate	Votes	%
Republican	Emily O'Brien (incumbent)	1,772	29.07%
Republican	Claire Cory (incumbent)	1,589	26.07%
Democratic–NPL	Adam Fortwengler	1,369	22.46%
Democratic–NPL	Zachary Stephen Tomczik	1,363	22.36%
Write-In	Write-in	3	0.05%
Total votes		6,096	100.0%
Republican hold			
Republican hold			

=== District 44 ===
North Dakota House of Representatives District 44 general election
Party	Candidate	Votes	%
Democratic–NPL	Karla Rose Hanson (incumbent)	3,827	35.77%
Democratic–NPL	Joshua Boschee (incumbent)	3,612	33.76%
Republican	Scott Wagner	3,191	29.83%
Write-In	Write-in	69	0.64%
Total votes		10,699	100.0%
Democratic–NPL hold			
Democratic–NPL hold			

=== District 46 ===
North Dakota House of Representatives District 46 general election
Party	Candidate	Votes	%
Republican	Shannon Roers Jones (incumbent)	3,984	27.77%
Republican	Jim Kasper (incumbent)	3,646	25.42%
Democratic–NPL	Ben M Hanson	3,353	23.37%
Democratic–NPL	Ben W Hanson	3,351	23.36%
Write-In	Write-in	11	0.08%
Total votes		14,345	100.0%
Republican hold			
Republican hold			

== See also ==
- 2020 North Dakota elections
- 2020 North Dakota Senate election
- 2020 United States state legislative elections
