= 2018 United States Senate election in North Dakota =

- November 6, 2018
- Turnout: 56.27% ▼
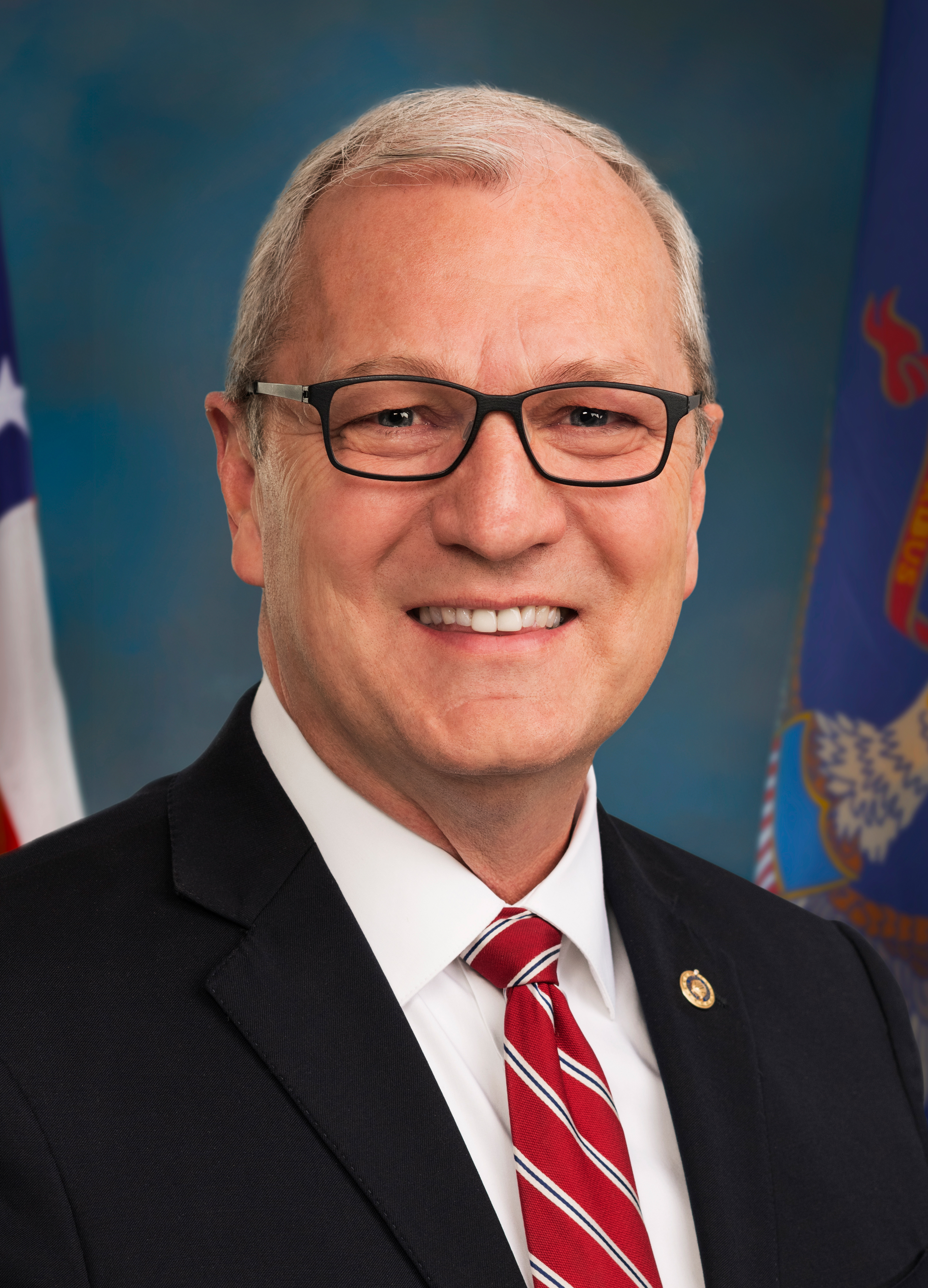

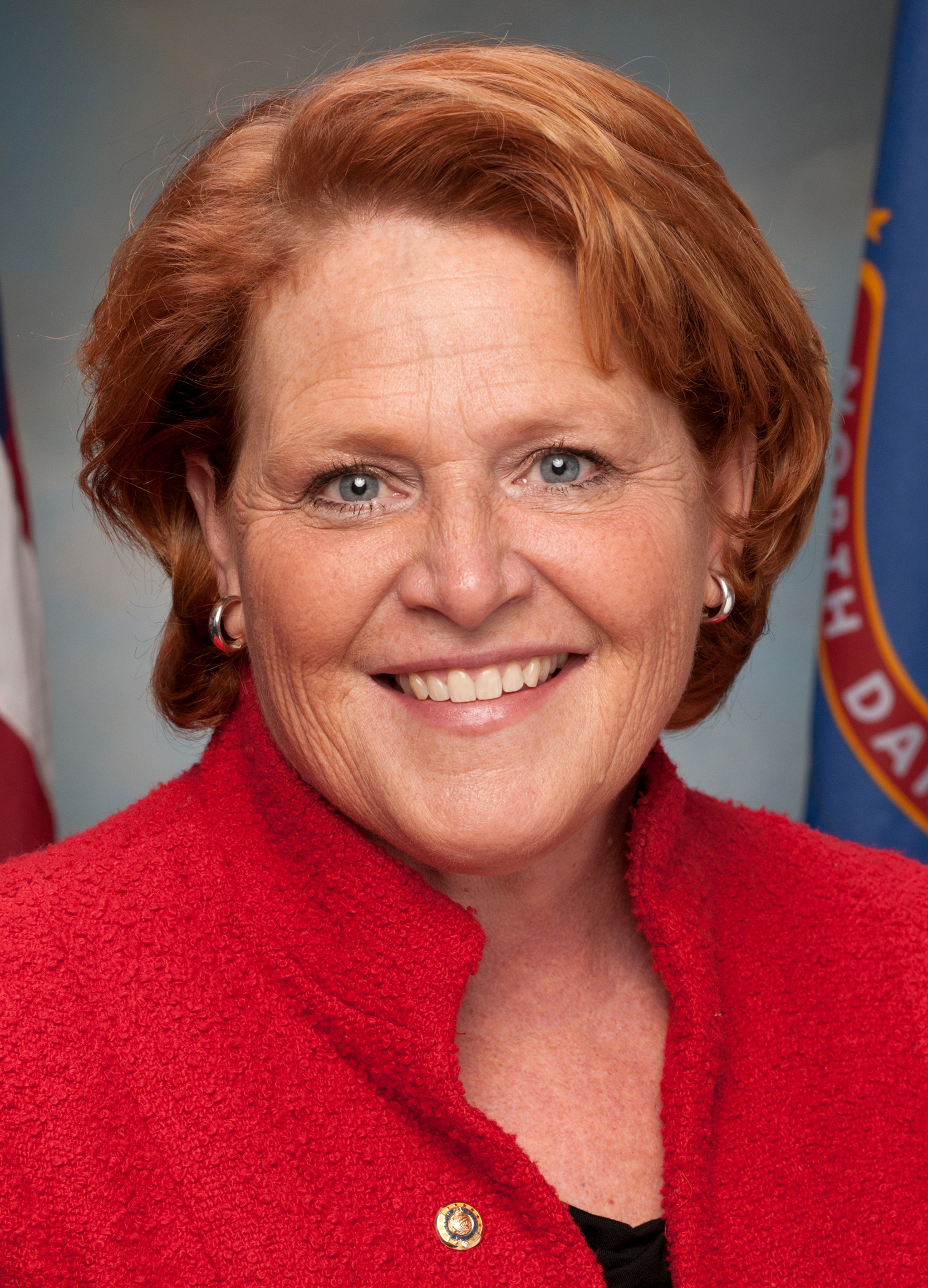
Nominee	Kevin Cramer	Heidi Heitkamp
Party	Republican	Democratic–NPL
Popular vote	179,720	144,376
Percentage	55.11%	44.27%
- Cramer: 40—50% 50–60% 60–70% 70–80% 80–90% >90% Heitkamp: 40–50% 50–60% 60–70% 80–90% >90%
U.S. senator before election
Heidi Heitkamp
Democratic–NPL
Elected U.S. Senator
Kevin Cramer
Republican

The 2018 United States Senate election in North Dakota took place on November 6, 2018, to elect a member of the United States Senate to represent the State of North Dakota, concurrently with other elections to the U.S. Senate, and other federal, state, and local elections in North Dakota.

This was one of ten Democratic-held Senate seats up for election in a state that Donald Trump won in the 2016 presidential election. Incumbent senator Heidi Heitkamp ran for re-election to a second term. The candidate filing deadline was April 9, 2018, and the primary election was held on June 12, 2018. U.S. Representative Kevin Cramer won the Republican primary to challenge Heitkamp, who ran unopposed in the Democratic primary.

On November 6, 2018, Cramer defeated Heitkamp in the general election, becoming the first Republican to win this seat since 1958 and winning 12 counties that Heitkamp won in 2012. In 2018, Heitkamp won 10 counties that voted Republican in the 2016 presidential race. As of 2026, this is the last congressional race in North Dakota in which the incumbent was defeated, and the last time a Republican U.S. Senate candidate in North Dakota lost any county other than Rolette or Sioux.

Cramer was sworn in on January 3, 2019, marking the first time since 1960 that Republicans simultaneously held both of North Dakota's Senate seats, and giving North Dakota an entirely Republican congressional delegation for the first time since 1959.

== Background ==
Many observers cited Heitkamp as a vulnerable incumbent Democrat in 2018, as she balanced cooperation with her Democratic colleagues in the U.S. Senate with pleasing her constituents in deeply Republican North Dakota; Donald Trump won in North Dakota by about 36 points. The race was expected to be extremely competitive, and some projected it would be the most expensive race in North Dakota history.

=== Voter ID law and Native Americans disenfranchisement ===
On October 9, 2018, the Supreme Court of the United States upheld North Dakota's voter ID law, called HB 1369. This law requires voters to use an ID which lists a street address, and does not allow PO boxes as valid addresses. However, many Native American reservations do not use a conventional address system, and their inhabitants tend to use PO boxes instead, making a large share of the IDs used by Native Americans invalid. Although both Natives and non-Natives are affected, Native Americans are disproportionately more likely to be affected by HB 1369, and the law has been criticized for disenfranchising Native Americans. The Republican-held state government of North Dakota argued that the law was created to prevent voter fraud but has been accused of passing the law because Native Americans are likely to vote Democratic.

A group of seven Native American voters led by Richard Brakebill, a U.S. Navy veteran enrolled in the Turtle Mountain Band of Chippewa Indians, challenged HB 1369 as violating the Equal Protection Clause of the Fourteenth Amendment. In the case of Brakebill v. Jaeger, judge Daniel L. Hovland of the District Court of North Dakota ruled in April 2018 that large parts of HB 1369 were unconstitutional, including the prohibition on IDs with PO box addresses.

North Dakota secretary of state Alvin Jaeger appealed the ruling to the Court of Appeals for the Eighth Circuit, and requested a stay on Hovland's ruling. The Eighth Circuit initially rejected Jaeger's stay request, with the primary elections in June 2018 not being affected by HB 1369, but revised its opinion in September 2018 and stayed Hovland's ruling. The plaintiffs filed a motion to the Supreme Court, requesting that they take up the case, but this motion was denied. Consequently, Hovland's ruling remained inoperative and HB 1369 was effective for the November 2018 general elections, with many people without the right ID being unable to vote.

Activists reacted to these suppression measures by educating voters, helping them get their identification cards updated, and giving them rides to the polls on election day. This backlash resulted in an unprecedented level of Native American turnout in this election.

== Democratic-NPL primary ==
The Democratic-NPL Party held their state convention March 16 and 17, during which delegates voted to endorse Heitkamp for re-election. Although general election ballot access is actually controlled by a primary election, challenger Dustin Peyer did not challenge Heitkamp in the June 2018 primary.

=== Candidates ===
==== Declared ====
- Heidi Heitkamp, incumbent U.S. senator

==== Withdrew ====
- Dustin Peyer, firefighter and candidate for the state senate in 2016

=== Endorsements ===
Heidi Heitkamp

Federal officials

- Joe Biden, former vice president
- Chuck Hagel, former secretary of defense (Republican)
- Tom Vilsack, former secretary of agriculture and governor of Iowa
- Mary Wakefield, former acting deputy secretary of health and human services

U.S. senators

- Kent Conrad, former U.S. senator (D-ND)
- Byron Dorgan, former U.S. senator (D-ND)
- Kirsten Gillibrand, U.S. senator (D-NY)

U.S. representatives

- Earl Pomeroy, former U.S. representative (D-ND)

Local officials

- Michael Brown, mayor of Grand Forks
- Tim McLean, Casselton fire chief
- Arland Rasmussen, former West Fargo police chief

Individuals

- Grace Link, former First Lady of North Dakota
- Amy Schumer, actress
- Amy Siskind, activist and writer

Organizations

- American Federation of Government Employees
- End Citizens United
- Feminist Majority Political Action Committee
- J Street
- Los Angeles Women's Collective
- National Association of Home Builders
- National Border Patrol Council
- National Committee to Preserve Social Security and Medicare
- National Education Association
- National Farmers Union PAC
- North Dakota AFL-CIO
- North Dakota United

Newspapers

- The Bismarck Tribune

=== Results ===
Results by county: Heitkamp—100% Heitkamp—≥90%

Democratic primary results
Party	Candidate	Votes	%
Democratic–NPL	Heidi Heitkamp (incumbent)	36,729	99.58%
Democratic–NPL	Write-ins	152	0.42%
Total votes		36,883	100.00%

== Republican primary ==
=== Candidates ===
==== Declared ====
- Kevin Cramer, U.S. representative
- Thomas O'Neill, former mayor of Niagara

==== Withdrew ====
- Tom Campbell, state senator (endorsed Cramer)
- Gary Emineth, businessman and former chairman of the North Dakota Republican Party
- Paul Schaffner

==== Declined ====
- Rick Becker, state representative and candidate for governor in 2016
- Rick Berg, former U.S. representative and nominee for U.S. Senate in 2012
- Tammy Miller, businesswoman
- Kathy Neset, member of the North Dakota State Board of Higher Education
- Ed Schafer, former United States secretary of agriculture and former governor of North Dakota
- Kelly Schmidt, North Dakota state treasurer
- Wayne Stenehjem, North Dakota attorney general and candidate for governor in 2016

=== Endorsements ===
Kevin Cramer

U.S. executive branch officials

- George W. Bush, 43rd president of the United States
- Mike Pence, 48th vice president of the United States
- Donald Trump, 45th president of the United States

U.S. senators

- John Hoeven, North Dakota
- David Perdue, Georgia
- Ben Sasse, Nebraska

U.S. governors

- Doug Burgum, North Dakota

N.D. state legislature officials

- Tom Campbell, state senator

Individuals

- Kimberly Guilfoyle, television news personality
- Clinton Romesha, Medal of Honor recipient

Organizations

- American Conservative Union
- Family Policy Alliance of North Dakota
- National Federation of Independent Business
- National Organization for Marriage
- National Right to Life
- North Dakota Farm Bureau
- North Dakota Right to Life
- NRA Political Victory Fund
- Republican Jewish Coalition
- Susan B. Anthony List

Newspapers

- The Forum of Fargo-Moorhead
- Minot Daily News
Tom Campbell (withdrawn)

State senators

- Howard C. Anderson Jr.
- Bill Bowman
- Randy Burckhard
- David Clemens
- Dick Dever
- David Hogue
- Jerry Klein
- Curt Kreun
- Lonnie Laffen
- Scott Meyer
- Dave Oehlke
- Arne Osland
- Shawn Vedaa
- Terry Wanzek
- Rich Wardner (majority leader)

State representatives

- Bert Anderson
- Rich Becker
- Jake Blum
- Chuck Damschen
- Jim Grueneich
- Dennis Johnson
- Mary Johnson
- Terry Jones
- Keith Kempenich
- Dwight Kiefert
- Gary Kreidt
- Vernon R. Laning
- Andrew Marschall
- David Monson
- Emily O'Brien
- Bill Oliver
- Bernie Satrom
- Wayne Trottier
- Greg Westlind
- Denton Zuhke

=== Polling ===
Hypothetical polling

Poll source	Date(s) administered	Sample size	Margin of error	Rick Becker	Rick Berg	Tom Campbell	Tammy Miller	Kathy Neset	Kelly Schmidt	Undecided
1892 Polling (R-Campbell)	October 11–12, 2017	400	± 4.0%	3%	24%	32%	1%	4%	1%	35%
1892 Polling (R-Campbell)	May 30 – June 1, 2017	400	± 4.0%	9%	39%	7%	–	–	–	45%

=== Results ===
Republican primary results by county Cramer ≥ 90% Cramer ≥ 80% Cramer ≥ 70%

Republican primary results
Party	Candidate	Votes	%
Republican	Kevin Cramer	61,529	87.73%
Republican	Thomas O'Neill	8,509	12.13%
Republican	Write-ins	95	0.14%
Total votes		70,133	100.00%

== General election ==
=== Debates ===
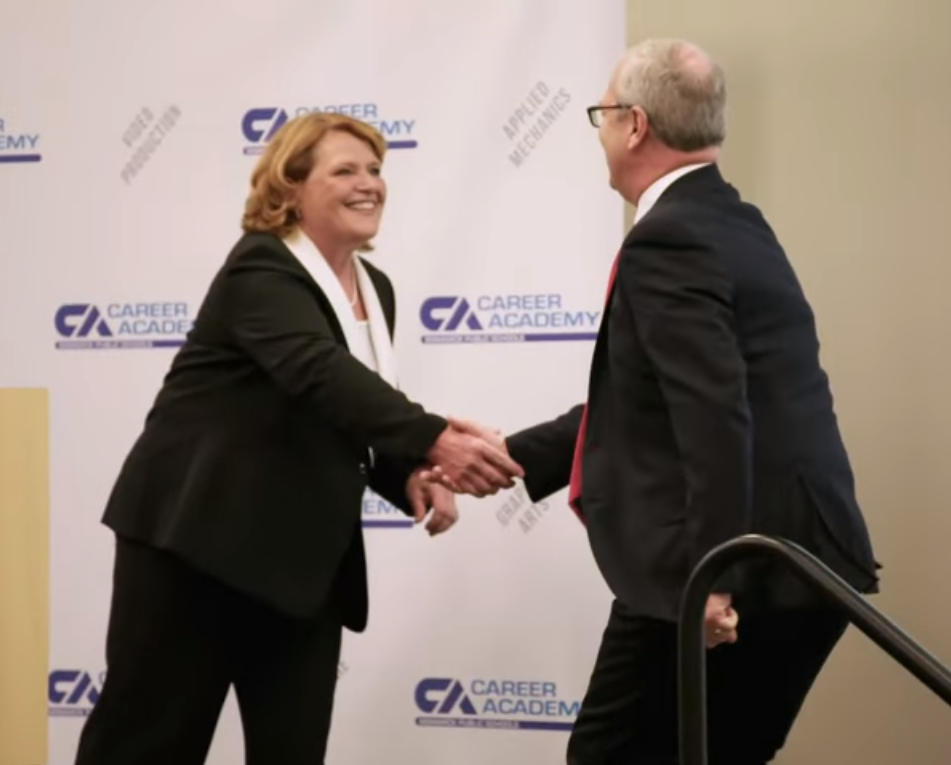
Heitkamp and Cramer greet each other during their debate for the 2018 Senate election.

- Complete video of debate, October 18, 2018

=== Predictions ===
Source	Ranking	As of
The Cook Political Report	Lean R (flip)	October 26, 2018
Inside Elections	Lean R (flip)	November 1, 2018
Sabato's Crystal Ball	Lean R (flip)	November 5, 2018
Daily Kos	Lean R (flip)	November 5, 2018
Fox News (Note: The Fox News Midterm Power Rankings uniquely does not contain a category for Safe/Solid races.)	Likely R (flip)	November 5, 2018
CNN	Lean R (flip)	November 5, 2018
RealClearPolitics	Lean R (flip)	November 5, 2018

=== Fundraising ===
Campaign finance reports as of October 17, 2018
Candidate (party)	Total receipts	Total disbursements	Cash on hand
Heidi Heitkamp (D)	$27,353,798	$16,356,442	$11,142,250
Kevin Cramer (R)	$5,584,357	$5,003,819	$976,045
Source: Federal Election Commission

=== Polling ===
View source data.

Poll source	Date(s) administered	Sample size	Margin of error	Heidi Heitkamp (D-NPL)	Kevin Cramer (R)	Other	Undecided
FOX News	October 27–30, 2018	789 LV	± 3.0%	42%	51%	2%	4%
FOX News	October 27–30, 2018	851 RV	± 3.0%	42%	49%	3%	6%
Trafalgar Group (R)	October 23–24, 2018	1,498	± 2.1%	46%	55%	–	–
Strategic Research Associates	October 12–19, 2018	650	± 3.8%	40%	56%	–	4%
FOX News	September 29 – October 2, 2018	704 LV	± 3.5%	41%	53%	2%	3%
FOX News	September 29 – October 2, 2018	801 RV	± 3.5%	41%	50%	3%	5%
Strategic Research Associates	September 17–27, 2018	650	± 3.8%	41%	51%	–	8%
FOX News	September 8–11, 2018	701 LV	± 3.5%	44%	48%	2%	6%
FOX News	September 8–11, 2018	804 RV	± 3.5%	42%	47%	2%	7%
SurveyMonkey/Axios	June 11 – July 2, 2018	457	± 7.5%	47%	52%	–	2%
Mason-Dixon	June 13–15, 2018	625	± 4.0%	44%	48%	–	8%
Gravis Marketing	February 21–24, 2018	385	± 5.0%	43%	40%	–	17%
The Tarrance Group (R-NRSC)	February 18–20, 2018	500	± 4.5%	44%	49%	–	7%

Hypothetical polling

Heidi Heitkamp vs. Generic Republican

Poll source	Date(s) administered	Sample size	Margin of error	Heidi Heitkamp (D)	Generic Republican	Undecided
SurveyMonkey/Axios	February 12 – March 5, 2018	821	± 3.2%	47%	49%	4%

Generic Democrat vs. Generic Republican

Poll source	Date(s) administered	Sample size	Margin of error	Generic Democrat	Generic Republican	Undecided
The Tarrance Group (R-NRSC)	February 18–20, 2018	500	± 4.5%	34%	48%	18%

Heidi Heitkamp vs. Tom Campbell

Poll source	Date(s) administered	Sample size	Margin of error	Heidi Heitkamp (D)	Tom Campbell (R)	Undecided
1892 Polling (R-Campbell)	October 11–12, 2017	500	± 4.9%	41%	44%	15%
1892 Polling (R-Campbell)	May 30 – June 1, 2017	500	± 4.9%	43%	37%	20%

Heidi Heitkamp vs. Kelly Schmidt

Poll source	Date(s) administered	Sample size	Margin of error	Heidi Heitkamp (D)	Kelly Schmidt (R)	Undecided
WPA Intelligence (R-Club for Growth)	September 10–11, 2017	406	± 4.9%	44%	48%	9%

=== Results ===
United States Senate election in North Dakota, 2018
Party	Candidate	Votes	%	±%
Republican	Kevin Cramer	179,720	55.11%	+5.79%
Democratic–NPL	Heidi Heitkamp (incumbent)	144,376	44.27%	−5.97%
Write-in		2,042	0.63%	+0.19%
Total votes		326,138	100.00%	N/A
Republican gain from Democratic–NPL				

==== By county ====
County	Kevin Cramer Republican		Heidi Heitkamp Democratic-NPL		All others Independent		Margin		Total votes
County	#	%	#	%	#	%	#	%	Total votes
Adams	796	68.4%	364	31.3%	4	0.3%	432	37.1%	1,164
Barnes	2,507	49.7%	2,517	49.9%	19	0.4%	-10	-0.2%	5,043
Benson	828	36.5%	1,427	62.9%	12	0.5%	-599	-26.4%	2,267
Billings	450	79.6%	115	20.4%	0	0.0%	335	59.2%	565
Bottineau	2,147	65.6%	1,110	33.9%	14	0.4%	1,037	31.7%	3,271
Bowman	1,233	74.9%	404	24.5%	12	0.7%	829	50.4%	1,649
Burke	729	75.6%	228	23.7%	7	0.7%	501	51.9%	964
Burleigh	28,494	61.7%	17,357	37.6%	358	0.8%	11,137	24.1%	46,209
Cass	32,217	41.6%	44,723	57.8%	487	9.6%	-12,506	-15.2%	77,427
Cavalier	1,181	60.3%	765	39.1%	12	0.6%	416	21.2%	1,958
Dickey	1,253	57.7%	911	42.0%	6	0.3%	342	15.7%	2,170
Divide	720	60.2%	469	39.2%	8	0.7%	251	21.0%	1,197
Dunn	1,499	73.7%	525	25.8%	10	0.5%	974	47.9%	2,034
Eddy	675	54.7%	555	45.0%	4	0.3%	120	9.7%	1,234
Emmons	1,433	78.1%	391	21.3%	11	0.6%	1,042	66.8%	1,835
Foster	1,052	63.6%	588	35.6%	14	0.8%	464	28.0%	1,654
Golden Valley	704	80.0%	171	19.4%	5	0.6%	533	60.6%	880
Grand Forks	12,952	46.4%	14,827	53.1%	157	0.6%	-1,875	-6.7%	27,936
Grant	925	72.9%	337	26.6%	6	0.5%	588	46.3%	1,268
Griggs	688	56.1%	534	43.6%	4	0.3%	154	12.5%	1,226
Hettinger	988	77.9%	274	21.6%	7	0.6%	714	56.3%	1,269
Kidder	911	71.2%	364	28.4%	5	0.4%	547	42.8%	1,280
LaMoure	1,203	58.1%	857	41.4%	9	0.4%	346	16.7%	2,069
Logan	741	75.8%	228	23.3%	8	0.8%	513	52.5%	977
McHenry	1,659	65.0%	879	34.4%	15	0.6%	780	30.6%	2,553
McIntosh	982	67.5%	467	32.1%	6	0.4%	515	35.4%	1,455
McKenzie	3,012	71.8%	1,167	27.8%	14	0.3%	1,845	44.0%	4,193
McLean	3,320	65.7%	1,701	33.7%	29	0.6%	1,619	32.0%	5,050
Mercer	2,941	73.1%	1,061	26.4%	22	0.5%	1,880	46.7%	4,024
Morton	9,583	64.3%	5,175	34.7%	138	0.9%	4,408	29.6%	14,896
Mountrail	2,208	57.8%	1,605	42.0%	7	0.2%	603	15.8%	3,820
Nelson	770	46.8%	866	52.6%	11	0.7%	-96	-5.8%	1,647
Oliver	717	73.8%	250	25.7%	5	0.5%	467	48.1%	972
Pembina	1,814	61.2%	1,132	38.2%	16	0.5%	682	23.0%	2,962
Pierce	1,168	61.9%	711	37.7%	9	0.5%	457	24.2%	1,888
Ramsey	2,668	52.8%	2,336	46.2%	53	1.0%	332	6.6%	5,057
Ransom	890	38.5%	1,399	60.6%	21	0.9%	-509	-22.1%	2,310
Renville	832	69.7%	356	29.8%	5	0.4%	476	39.9%	1,193
Richland	3,316	45.4%	3,943	54.0%	48	0.7%	-627	-8.6%	7,307
Rolette	993	19.7%	4,042	80.1%	10	0.2%	-3,049	-59.4%	5,045
Sargent	821	41.0%	1,171	58.5%	10	0.5%	-350	-17.5%	2,002
Sheridan	607	76.9%	179	22.7%	3	0.4%	428	54.2%	789
Sioux	221	15.3%	1,211	83.7%	14	1.0%	-990	-68.4%	1,446
Slope	307	80.6%	73	19.2%	1	0.3%	234	61.4%	381
Stark	8,945	73.5%	3,151	25.9%	70	0.6%	5,794	47.6%	12,166
Steele	399	41.6%	557	58.0%	4	0.4%	-158	-16.4%	960
Stutsman	5,489	57.3%	4,027	42.0%	67	0.7%	1,462	14.7%	9,583
Towner	624	55.4%	497	44.1%	6	0.5%	127	11.3%	1,127
Traill	1,735	46.4%	1,988	53.1%	19	0.5%	-253	-6.7%	3,742
Walsh	2,550	56.5%	1,937	42.9%	25	0.6%	613	13.6%	4,512
Ward	15,105	62.6%	8,856	36.7%	167	0.7%	6,249	25.9%	24,128
Wells	1,601	71.7%	622	27.9%	10	0.4%	979	43.8%	2,233
Williams	8,117	72.8%	2,976	26.7%	58	0.5%	5,141	46.1%	11,151
Totals	179,720	55.1%	144,376	44.3%	2,042	0.6%	35,344	10.8%	326,138

Counties that flipped from Democratic to Republican

- Eddy (largest city: New Rockford)
- Cavalier (largest city: Langdon)
- Divide (largest city: Crosby)
- Foster (largest city: Carrington)
- Griggs (largest city: Cooperstown)
- McHenry (largest city: Velva)
- Mountrail (largest city: New Town)
- Pembina (largest city: Cavalier)
- Ramsey (largest city: Devils Lake)
- Stutsman (largest city: Jamestown)
- Towner (largest city: Cando)
- Walsh (largest city: Grafton)
