= Richard Holman =

American politician (born 1943)

Member of the North Dakota House of Representatives from the 20th district
- Incumbent
- Assumed office 2008
- Succeeded by: Mike Beltz (elect)

Personal details
- Born: August 23, 1943 (age 82) Mayville, North Dakota, United States
- Party: North Dakota Democratic-Nonpartisan League Party
- Education: Mayville State University (BS); Bemidji State University (MS); University of North Dakota (EdD)

Richard Holman (born August 23, 1943) is an American politician. He is a member of the North Dakota House of Representatives from the 20th District, serving since 2008. He is a member of the Democratic-NPL party.
