= Josh Christy =

American politician (1982–2025)

Member of the North Dakota House of Representatives from the 27th district
- In office December 1, 2022 – February 18, 2025 Serving with Greg Stemen
- Succeeded by: Timothy Brown

Personal details
- Born: June 28, 1981 Barnes County, North Dakota, U.S.
- Died: February 18, 2025 (aged 43) Bismarck, North Dakota, U.S.
- Party: Republican
- Spouse: Mary
- Children: 3
- Education: University of North Dakota

Joshua David Christy (June 28, 1981 – February 18, 2025) was an American politician. He served as a member of the North Dakota House of Representatives from the 27th district, alongside Greg Stemen. He was a member of the North Dakota House of Representatives.

Christy died of natural causes on February 18, 2025, at the age of 43.
