= Mary Johnson (politician) =

American politician

Mary C. Johnson

Member of the North Dakota House of Representatives from the 45th district
- Incumbent
- Assumed office December 1, 2014 Serving with Tom Kading
- Preceded by: John Heilman

Personal details
- Born: Grand Forks, North Dakota, U.S.
- Party: Republican
- Spouse: David
- Children: 2
- Education: University of North Dakota School of Law; Minnesota State University at Moorhead
- Profession: Lawyer; Politician

Mary C. Johnson is an American politician serving as a Member of the North Dakota House of Representatives since December 2014. She represents the 45th district alongside Tom Kading. Johnson is a Republican.

== Biography ==
Johnson was born in Grand Forks, North Dakota. She obtained an LLB and an JD from the University of North Dakota School of Law, while she also holds an Accounting, B.S. from the Minnesota State University at Moorhead. Johnson practices as a volunteer attorney and serves on the Fargo Park Board.

In 2014, Johnson announced that she was running for state representative. She won the June Republican primary alongside Tom Kading. Johnson and Kading went on to win the November general election. She was sworn in as a representative on December 1, 2014, and succeeded Republican John Heilman. Johnson won re-election in the 2018 general election.

Johnson is married to Dave, and they have two children together. They reside in Fargo.
