= Guggisberg (disambiguation) =

Guggisberg (Bernese German Guggishbärg [ˈgʊkisbærg]) is a municipality in the Bern-Mittelland administrative district in the Swiss canton of Bern.

Guggisberg may also refer to:

- Guggisberg Cheese Company, developer of American Baby Swiss cheese

== People with the surname ==
- Gordon Guggisberg (1869–1930), British Brigadier-General, Sir, senior Canadian-born British Army officer
- Gunvor Guggisberg (born 1974), Swiss singer and dancer known professionally simply as Gunvor
- Ron Guggisberg (born 1973), US politician, Democratic member of the North Dakota House of Representatives
