= Damschen =

Damschen is a surname. Notable people with the surname include:

- Chuck Damschen (born 1955), American politician
- David Damschen, American politician
- Karl Damschen, (born 1942), German architect
