= Greg Westlind =

American politician

Member of the North Dakota House of Representatives from the 15th district
- Incumbent
- Assumed office July 25, 2016
- Preceded by: Curt Hofstad

Personal details
- Born: August 31, 1948 (age 77)
- Party: Republican

Greg Westlind (born August 31, 1948) is an American politician who has served in the North Dakota House of Representatives from the 15th district since 2016.
