= Gary Paur =

American politician (born 1947)

Member of the North Dakota House of Representatives from the 19th district
- Incumbent
- Assumed office 2011

Personal details
- Born: November 3, 1947 (age 78)
- Party: Republican
- Spouse: Ruth
- Children: three
- Profession: farmer

Gary Arlee Paur (born November 3, 1947) is an American politician. He has served as a Republican member for the 19th district in the North Dakota House of Representatives since 2011.
