= Laura Dronen =

American politician

Member-elect of the North Dakota House of Representatives from the 21st district
- Assuming office December 2026
- Succeeding: Mary Schneider

Personal details
- Party: Democratic

Laura Dronen is an American politician. A member of the Democratic Party, she is the member-elect for the 21st district of the North Dakota House of Representatives.
