= Roger Brabandt =

American politician (born 1946)

Member of the North Dakota House of Representatives from the 5th district
- Incumbent
- Assumed office 2011

Personal details
- Born: December 3, 1946 (age 79) Granville, North Dakota
- Party: Republican
- Spouse: Juell
- Children: one
- Profession: Paint Store Manager

Roger Brabandt (born December 3, 1946) is an American politician. He has served as a Republican member for the 5th district in the North Dakota House of Representatives since 2011. Brabandt describes himself as "pro-life" and "very conservative."
