= Tracy Boe =

American politician

Member of the North Dakota House of Representatives from the 9th district
- In office December 1, 2002 – December 1, 2022
- Succeeded by: Jayme Davis

Personal details
- Party: North Dakota Democratic-NPL Party
- Spouse: Sandy
- Profession: Farmer

Tracy Boe is a North Dakota Democratic-NPL Party member of the North Dakota House of Representatives who represented the 9th district from 2002 to 2022. He lost the 2022 primary to Jayme Davis.
