= Gary Kreidt =

American politician

Member of the North Dakota House of Representatives
- In office December 1, 2002 – December 1, 2024
- Succeeded by: Ty Dressler
- Constituency: 33rd district (2002–2022); 36th district (2022–2024)

Personal details
- Born: c. 1940 (age 85–86)
- Party: Republican

Gary Kreidt (born c. 1940) is an American politician. He is a member of the North Dakota House of Representatives from the 36th District, serving from 2002-2024. He is a member of the Republican party.
