= Tom Kading =

American politician, business owner, and lawyer

Member of the North Dakota House of Representatives from the 45th district
- In office 2015
- Preceded by: Ed Gruchalla

Personal details
- Born: c. 1987 Park Rapids, Minnesota
- Party: North Dakota Republican Party
- Spouse: Ashley
- Education: North Dakota State University Bachelors-Civil Engineering; University of North Dakota Juris Doctor and Master-Business Management
- Profession: Small business owner, Attorney

Tom Kading is an American politician, business owner, and lawyer.

== Background ==
In 1987, Kading was born in Park Rapids, Minnesota.

== Education ==
In 2010, Kading earned a bachelor's degree in civil engineering from North Dakota State University. In 2013, Kading earned M.B.A. and J.D. degrees from University of North Dakota.

== Career ==
Kading is a business owner and lawyer. Kading serves as a North Dakota Republican Party member of the North Dakota House of Representatives, representing the 45th Legislative District in Fargo, N.D. since 2015.
