= Liz Conmy =

American politician (1958–2026)

Member of the North Dakota House of Representatives from the 11th district
- In office December 1, 2022 – April 25, 2026
- Preceded by: Ron Guggisberg
- Succeeded by: Adam Goldwyn

Personal details
- Born: June 15, 1958 Langdon, North Dakota, U.S.
- Died: April 25, 2026 (aged 67) Brooklyn Park, Minnesota, U.S.
- Party: Democratic–NPL
- Education: North Dakota State University (BA); University of St. Thomas (MA)

Liz Anne Conmy (née Quam; June 15, 1958 – April 25, 2026) was an American politician who served as a member of the North Dakota House of Representatives from 2022 until her death in 2026. She represented the 11th district alongside Gretchen Dobervich and she was a member of the Democratic–NPL. She was born in Langdon, North Dakota.

Conmy died on April 25, 2026, at the age of 67, when a plane in which she was a passenger crashed in Brooklyn Park, Minnesota, shortly after takeoff from Crystal Airport in Crystal, Minnesota. The pilot of the aircraft also died.
