= Desiree Morton =

American politician

Member of the North Dakota House of Representatives from the 46th district
- Incumbent
- Assumed office December 1, 2024

Personal details
- Party: Republican
- Website: mortonfordistrict46.com

Desiree Morton is an American politician serving as a member of the North Dakota House of Representatives from the 46th district. A Republican, she was elected in the 2024 North Dakota House of Representatives election.
