= Ron Guggisberg =

American politician (born 1973)

Member of the North Dakota House of Representatives from the 11th district
- In office 2011 – December 1, 2022
- Succeeded by: Liz Conmy

Personal details
- Born: September 12, 1973 (age 52) Fargo, North Dakota
- Party: Democratic-NPL
- Spouse: Gayle

Ron Guggisberg (born September 12, 1973) is a Democratic member of the North Dakota House of Representatives, representing the 11th district. Guggisberg is a fire department captain. He is a Lutheran.
