= Adam Goldwyn =

American professor and politician

Member of the North Dakota House of Representatives from the 11th district
- Incumbent
- Assumed office May 26, 2026
- Preceded by: Liz Conmy
- Succeeded by: Anastassiya Andrianova (elect)

Chair of the North Dakota Democratic Party
- Incumbent
- Assumed office April 24, 2023
- Preceded by: Patrick Hart

Personal details
- Party: Democratic
- Spouse: Anastassiya Andrianova
- Education: Pomona College (BA); University College London (MA); City University of New York (MPhil, PhD)

Adam Goldwyn is an American professor and politician who has served as the chair of the North Dakota Democratic–Nonpartisan League Party since 2023. He was appointed to the North Dakota House of Representatives in May 2026 after the death of Liz Conmy in a plane crash the previous month.

Party political offices
Preceded by Patrick Hart	Chair of the North Dakota Democratic Party; 2023–present	Incumbent
