= Dori Hauck =

American politician

Member of the North Dakota House of Representatives from the 36th district
- Incumbent
- Assumed office March 16, 2021 Serving with Mike Schatz
- Preceded by: Luke Simons

Personal details
- Party: Republican

Dori Hauck is an American farmer, teacher, and politician currently serving in the North Dakota House of Representatives from North Dakota's 36th district. She was appointed to the seat after incumbent Republican Luke Simons was expelled from the house due to misconduct. She was selected to replace Simons and was sworn in on March 16, 2022.
