= James Schmidt (politician) =

American politician (born 1950)

Member of the North Dakota House of Representatives from the 31st district
- Incumbent
- Assumed office 2013

Personal details
- Born: July 28, 1950 (age 75) Cando, North Dakota
- Party: Republican
- Children: 2
- Profession: Farmer, businessman

James "Jim" Schmidt (born July 28, 1950) is an American politician. He has served as a Republican member for the 31st district in the North Dakota House of Representatives since 2013.

He lost his bid for reelection on June 14, 2022.
