= Ty Dressler =

American politician

Member of the North Dakota House of Representatives from the 36th district
- Incumbent
- Assumed office December 1, 2024
- Preceded by: Gary Kreidt

Personal details
- Party: Republican
- Education: North Dakota State University

Ty Dressler is an American politician serving as a member of the North Dakota House of Representatives from the 36th district. A Republican, he was elected in the 2024 North Dakota House of Representatives election.
