= Wayne Trottier =

American politician

Member of the North Dakota House of Representatives from the 19th district
- In office December 1, 2010 – December 1, 2022

Personal details
- Born: Cavalier, North Dakota
- Party: Republican
- Spouse: Gladys
- Education: North Dakota State University
- Profession: Auctioneer

Wayne Trottier is an American politician in the state of North Dakota. He is a member of the North Dakota House of Representatives, representing the 19th district. He served on the Northwood City Council from 2004 to 2008 before his election to the legislature in 2010.

== Background ==
Trottier served for two years in the U.S. Army and worked as a sales manager for a feed company and as an auctioneer. He also served on the North Dakota State Fair Board for 16 years prior to his election to the legislature.

== Personal life ==
Trottier is retired from politics. He is married with one son.
