= Dan Vollmer =

American politician

Member of the North Dakota House of Representatives from the 6th district
- Incumbent
- Assumed office December 1, 2024

Personal details
- Party: Republican

Daniel R. Vollmer is an American politician. He has served as a member of the North Dakota House of Representatives since 2024, representing the 6th district. He is a member of the Republican Party.
