= Nathan Toman =

American politician

Member of the North Dakota House of Representatives from the 34th district
- Incumbent
- Assumed office 2012

Personal details
- Party: Republican
- Education: Bismarck State College

Nathan Toman is an American politician who, as of 2017, serves in the North Dakota House of Representatives.
