= Dave Rustebakke =

American farmer and politician

Member of the North Dakota House of Representatives from the 20th district
- Incumbent
- Assumed office April 11, 2026
- Preceded by: Jared Hagert

Personal details
- Party: Republican
- Occupation: Farmer

Dave Rustebakke is an American farmer and politician. He has served as a member of the North Dakota House of Representatives since 2026, representing the 20th district. He was appointed to the legislature following the resignation of Jared Hagert. Rustebakke previously served as the legislative director for the North Dakota Farm Bureau for eight years.
