= Dawson Holle =

American politician (born 2003)

Member of the North Dakota House of Representatives from the 31st district
- Incumbent
- Assumed office December 1, 2022 Serving with Karen Rohr
- Preceded by: Jim Schmidt
- Constituency: Grant County; Hettinger County (part); Morton County (part); Sioux County

Personal details
- Born: November 25, 2003 (age 22) Bismarck, North Dakota, U.S.
- Party: Republican
- Education: University of Mary (attending)
- Profession: Dairy farmer
- Website: https://dawsonholle.com/

Dawson Holle (born November 25, 2003) is an American politician who has served in the North Dakota House of Representatives from the 31st district since 2023. Holle is the youngest elected lawmaker in the history of the state at age 18.

== Career ==
Holle announced his candidacy for former incumbent Jim Schmidt's seat in the 31st district on April 8, 2022. When Holle's candidacy was first announced, he was in his senior year at Mandan High School, and campaigned the rest of the school year.

On June 14, 2022, Holle won the Republican primary for District 31 alongside Karen Rohr with 33.9% of the vote. Holle later won in the general election on November 8. He was sworn in on December 1.

In August 2022, Holle was revealed to be a member of a Telegram group called the North Dakota Young Republicans which "frequently featured bigoted slurs and white supremacist tropes" in its messages between members, including personal attacks against gay public figures and anti-Semitic conspiracy theories. "To be honest I've just kind of not really been on the app because that's the only group I'm a part of on the app," he said. "I haven't really noticed anything. I just joined it recently so I'm not really familiar with it."

== Electoral history ==
=== 2022 ===
Republican primary for North Dakota House of Representatives District 31 (2 seats)
Candidate	% of votes	# of Votes
Dawson Holle	33.9	1,055
Karen Rohr	33.8	1,049
James Schmidt	32.1	997
Other	0.2	7

General election for North Dakota House of Representatives District 31 (2 seats)
Candidate	% of votes	# of Votes
Karen Rohr (R)	42	3,361
Dawson Holle (R)	40	3,250
Mike Faith (D)	17	1,358
Other	0.4	33
