= Dick Anderson (North Dakota politician) =

American politician

Member of the North Dakota House of Representatives from the 6th district
- Incumbent
- Assumed office 2011

Personal details
- Born: June 15, 1952 (age 74) Willow City, North Dakota, U.S.
- Party: Republican
- Spouse: Susan
- Children: 2
- Profession: farmer

Dick Anderson (born June 15, 1952) is an American politician. He has served as a Republican member for the 6th district in the North Dakota House of Representatives since 2011. Partner, Anderson Grain
