= Terry Jones (politician) =

American politician

Member of the North Dakota House of Representatives from the 4th district
- In office December 1, 2016 – December 1, 2022

Personal details
- Party: Republican
- Spouse: Kelly
- Children: 6

Terry B. Jones is an American politician who served as a member of the North Dakota House of Representatives from the 4th district. Elected in November 2016, he assumed office on December 1, 2016.

== Career ==
Outside of politics, he was worked as a contractor and rancher. He was elected to the North Dakota House of Representatives in November 2016 and assumed office on December 1, 2016.

In 2020, members of the North Dakota House District 4 Democratic-NPL Party requested that Secretary of State Alvin Jaeger remove Jones's name from the November ballot, claiming that he was a legal resident of Wyoming and ineligible to run for the election. Jones owns a farming and construction business in Wyoming that is co-operated by his sons. The North Dakota Supreme Court later ruled in favor of Jones.

In 2021, Jones circulated a video in support of QAnon to all members of the North Dakota House of Representatives via email. Jones later issued an apology, claiming that he had believed the video was a message from President Donald Trump.

== Personal life ==
Jones lives in New Town, North Dakota. He and his wife, Kelly, have six children.
