= Clayton Fegley =

American politician

Member of the North Dakota House of Representatives from the 4th district
- Incumbent
- Assumed office 2018

Personal details
- Born: Clayton Fegley
- Party: Republican
- Spouse: Holly
- Profession: 4

Clayton Fegley is an American politician who has served in the North Dakota House of Representatives from the 4th district since 2018. He serves alongside Terry Jones. Fegley is a Republican.
