= Dustin McNally =

American politician

Member of the North Dakota House of Representatives from the 42nd district
- Incumbent
- Assumed office September 19, 2025
- Preceded by: Emily O’Brien

Personal details
- Born: Grand Forks, North Dakota
- Party: Republican
- Profession: Senior Lecturer in Mechanical Engineering

Dustin McNally is an American politician who was appointed as the Member of the North Dakota House of Representatives from the 42nd District following the resignation of Emily O'Brien in September 2025.

Dustin currently teaches as a Senior Lecturer in Mechanical Engineering at the University of North Dakota. He also holds the position of Assistant Dean for Student Success.
