= Karen Grindberg =

American politician

Member of the North Dakota House of Representatives from the 41st district
- Incumbent
- Assumed office December 2, 2024
- Preceded by: Michelle Strinden

Personal details
- Party: Republican

Karen Grindberg is an American politician. She serves as a Republican member for the 41st district of the North Dakota House of Representatives.
