= LaurieBeth Hager =

American politician and academic administrator

Member of the North Dakota House of Representatives from the 21st district
- Incumbent
- Assumed office December 1, 2018 Serving with Mary Schneider

Personal details
- Party: Democratic
- Education: University of North Dakota (BS); North Dakota State University (MS)

LaurieBeth Hager is an American politician and academic administrator serving as a member of the North Dakota House of Representatives from the 21st district. She assumed office on December 1, 2018.

== Education ==
Hager attended Finley Sharon High School in Finley, North Dakota. She earned a Bachelor of Science degree in psychology from the University of North Dakota and a Master of Science in counseling education from North Dakota State University.

== Career ==
Prior to entering politics, Hager worked as a counselor and student affairs administrator at the North Dakota State University. In the 2018 election for district 21 in the North Dakota House of Representatives, Hager and Mary Schneider defeated their Republican opponents.
