= Mark Sanford (North Dakota politician) =

American politician (born 1939)

Member of the North Dakota House of Representatives from the 17th district
- Incumbent
- Assumed office 2011

Personal details
- Born: January 5, 1939 (age 87) Watford City, North Dakota
- Party: Republican
- Spouse: Gloria
- Profession: Retired School Administrator

Mark S. Sanford (born January 5, 1939) is an American politician in the state of North Dakota. He is a member of the North Dakota House of Representatives, representing the 17th district. A Republican, he was first elected in 2010. An alumnus of Minot State University and the University of North Dakota, he was an academic administrator.
