= Scott Louser =

American politician (born 1971)

Member of the North Dakota House of Representatives from the 5th district
- Incumbent
- Assumed office December 1, 2010
- Preceded by: Louis Pinkerton

Personal details
- Born: July 24, 1971 (age 55) Minot, North Dakota
- Party: Republican

Scott Louser (born July 24, 1971) is an American politician who has served in the North Dakota House of Representatives from the 5th district since 2010. In 2021, he pled guilty to Driving Under the Influence (DUI).
