= Karla Rose Hanson =

American politician

Member of the North Dakota House of Representatives from the 44th district
- Incumbent
- Assumed office December 1, 2016
- Preceded by: Blair Thoreson

Personal details
- Born: May 20, 1972 (age 54)
- Party: Democratic

Karla Rose Hanson (born May 20, 1972) is an American politician who has served in the North Dakota House of Representatives from the 44th district since 2016.

In 1994, Hanson graduated from North Dakota State University with a bachelor's degree in Communication. Throughout her career outside of serving for the North Dakota House of Representatives, Hanson has been employed by Great Plains Software, held the role of Managing Editor for Daily Journal, and served in multiple capacities at Microsoft. Currently, she is the owner of Karla Rose Hanson Communications, Limited Liability Company. In addition to her professional experience, Hanson is a co-founder of both North Dakota Coalition for Privacy in Health Care and Faith Forward Network North Dakota. She resides in Fargo along with her husband Shawn and their two children.

== Elections ==
Hanson (alongside incumbent Joshua Boschee) defeated two Republican opponents in the 2016 General Election for District 44, with one of the opponents being an incumbent. In the 2020 General Election, Hanson and Joshua Boschee won reelection, this time defeating the Republican opponent Scott Wagner. From the year 2019 through 2021, Hanson served as the Assistant Minority Leader of the North Dakota House of Representatives.

== Committee assignments ==
During the 65th Assembly starting in 2017, she served on the Judiciary and Political Subdivisions Standing Committees. From 2019 during the 66th Assembly through the current 67th Assembly, she has been serving on the Judiciary and Transportation Standing Committees.

== Sponsored legislation ==
During her time as a legislator, Hanson has had numerous areas of policy that she has advocated for. Some of these policy areas are described as paid family leave, health care, criminal justice reform, safe neighborhoods and an equitable economy.

Hanson was the primary sponsor of three house bills during the 65th Assembly. House bills 1232 and 1411 related to the reporting of political and campaign donations and statements, and house bill 1410 focused on penalties and disclosure forms pertaining to lobbyists. All three house bills were not passed.

During the 66th Assembly, she was the primary sponsor for six house bills. Most notably, House bill 1248 was passed and signed into law. This bill enabled the option for the designation of income tax contributions to the veterans' postwar trust fund, either by deduction of refunds or additions to tax liability. The other five bills did not pass.

Currently in the 67th Assembly, Hanson has been the primary sponsor for four bills, with three of them being passed and signed into law. Particularly relevant to Hanson's policy areas of advocacy, House bill 1288 added continuous glucose monitoring devices to what is covered by Medicaid.
