= Scott Wagner (North Dakota politician) =

American politician

Member of the North Dakota House of Representatives from the 45th district
- Incumbent
- Assumed office December 1, 2022 Serving with Carrie McLeod

Personal details
- Party: Republican
- Spouse: Greta
- Education: North Dakota State University (BS)

Scott Wagner is an American politician. He is serving as a member of the North Dakota House of Representatives from the 45th district, alongside Carrie McLeod. He is a member of the Republican Party. Wagner previously served as county commissioner for Cass County from 2000 to 2012.
