= Chuck Damschen =

American politician (born 1955)

Member of the North Dakota House of Representatives from the 10th district
- Incumbent
- Assumed office 2004

Personal details
- Born: March 27, 1955 (age 71) Devils Lake, North Dakota, United States
- Party: Republican

Chuck Damschen (born March 27, 1955) is an American politician serving in the North Dakota House of Representatives. A member of the Republican party, he has represented the 10th District since 2004.
