= Mike Beltz =

North Dakota House of Representatives politician

Member of the North Dakota House of Representatives from the 20th district
- Incumbent
- Assumed office December 1, 2020 Serving with Dave Rustebakke

Personal details
- Party: Republican
- Education: North Dakota State University (BS)

Mike Beltz is an American politician serving as a member of the North Dakota House of Representatives from the 20th district. Elected in November 2018, he assumed office on December 1, 2020.

== Education ==
Beltz earned a Bachelor of Science degree in animal science from North Dakota State University.

== Career ==
Outside of politics, Beltz has worked as a farmer. He was also the chair of the North Dakota Ag Coalition and the North Dakota State Board of Agricultural Research and Education. Beltz was elected to the North Dakota House of Representatives in November 2020 and assumed office on December 1, 2020.
