= Michael Don Brandenburg =

American politician (born 1956)

Member of the North Dakota House of Representatives from the 28th district
- Incumbent
- Assumed office 2004

Personal details
- Born: October 1, 1956 (age 69) Jamestown, North Dakota, U.S.
- Party: Republican (1997-present); Democratic (pre-1997)

Michael Don Brandenburg (born October 1, 1956) is an American politician. He has been a member of the North Dakota House of Representatives from the 28th District, serving since 2004. He is a member of the Republican party. He also served from 1997 to 2002. Brandenburg was elected as a Democrat, but on October 2, 1997, he switched parties to join the Republican majority in his first session in the Legislature.

== See also ==
- List of American politicians who switched parties in office
