= Bob Martinson =

American politician (born 1952)

Member of the North Dakota House of Representatives from the 35th district
- Incumbent
- Assumed office 2000

Personal details
- Born: August 19, 1952 (age 73) Bismarck, North Dakota, U.S.
- Party: Republican

Bob Martinson (born August 19, 1952) is an American politician. He is a member of the North Dakota House of Representatives from the 35th District, serving since 2000. He is a member of the Republican Party. Martinson also served in the House from 1972 to 1997 and as Majority Leader in 1993.
