= Carrie McLeod =

American politician

Member of the North Dakota House of Representatives from the 45th district
- Incumbent
- Assumed office December 1, 2022 Serving with Scott Wagner

Personal details
- Party: Republican

Carrie McLeod is an American politician. She is serving as a member of the North Dakota House of Representatives from the 45th district, alongside Scott Wagner. She is a member of the Republican Party.
