= Jay Fisher =

American politician and agronomist

Member of the North Dakota House of Representatives from the 5th district
- Incumbent
- Assumed office December 1, 2018

Personal details
- Party: Republican
- Spouse: Marlys
- Children: 4
- Education: North Dakota State University (BS, MS)

Jay Fisher is an American politician and agronomist serving as a member of the North Dakota House of Representatives from the 5th district. Elected in November 2018, he assumed office on December 1, 2018.

Fisher has declared his candidacy in the 2026 North Dakota Senate election for the 5th legislative district to succeed retiring Republican senator Randy Burckhard. He is unopposed in the Republican primary.

== Early life and education ==
Fisher is a native of Minot, North Dakota. He earned a Bachelor of Science and Master of Science in agronomy and crop science from North Dakota State University.

== Career ==
From 1994 to 2015, Fisher served as the director of the North Central Research Extension Center at North Dakota State University. Since 2016, he has worked as an agronomist for Fisher Research LLC. Fisher was elected to the North Dakota House of Representatives in November 2018 and assumed office on December 1, 2018.
