= Mike Motschenbacher =

American politician

Member of the North Dakota House of Representatives from the 47th district
- Incumbent
- Assumed office 2023
- Preceded by: Robb Eckert

Personal details
- Party: Republican
- Education: Bismarck State College

Mike Motschenbacher is an American politician. He serves as a Republican member for the 47th district of the North Dakota House of Representatives.

== Life and career ==
Motschenbacher is executive director of the North Dakota Gaming Alliance. He was also president of the North Dakota Hospitality Association.

In 2022, Motschenbacher was elected to represent the 47th district of the North Dakota House of Representatives, succeeding Robb Eckert. He assumed office in 2023.
