= Karen Karls =

American politician

Member of the North Dakota House of Representatives from the 35th district
- Incumbent
- Assumed office 2006

Personal details
- Party: Republican

Karen Karls is an American politician. She is a member of the North Dakota House of Representatives from the 35th District, serving since 2006. She is a member of the Republican party.

== Education ==
Karl's has a Bachelor of Science degree in Medical technology from Minot State University.

== Career ==
Karl's is a wedding cake decorator. In 2006, Karl's political career began as a Representative of North Dakota State Assembly.
