= Craig Headland =

American politician (born 1960)

Member of the North Dakota House of Representatives from the 29th district
- Incumbent
- Assumed office 2002

Personal details
- Born: October 25, 1960 (age 65) Jamestown, North Dakota, U.S.
- Party: Republican

Craig Headland (born October 25, 1960) is an American politician. He is a member of the North Dakota House of Representatives from the 29th District, serving since 2002. He is a member of the Republican party.

Headland serves as chairman of the House Finance and Taxation committee.
