= Mary Schneider (politician) =

American politician

Member of the North Dakota House of Representatives from the 21st district
- Incumbent
- Assumed office 2014
- Succeeded by: Laura Dronen (elect)

Personal details
- Born: Mary Schneider
- Party: North Dakota Democratic–Nonpartisan League Party

Mary Schneider is an American politician who, as of 2017, sits in the North Dakota House of Representatives.

Schneider has served in the North Dakota House of Representatives since 2015 and, for a brief period, sat in the chamber at the same time as her son, Mac Schneider, until he lost his reelection bid.

Schneider has declared her candidacy in the 2026 North Dakota Senate election for the 21st legislative district to succeed retiring Democratic–NPL senator Kathy Hogan. She is unopposed in the Democratic–NPL primary.
