= Keith Kempenich =

American politician (born 1958)

Member of the North Dakota House of Representatives from the 39th district
- Incumbent
- Assumed office 1993

Personal details
- Born: July 28, 1959 (age 66) Bowman, North Dakota, U.S.
- Party: Republican

Keith Kempenich (born July 28, 1958) is an American politician. He is a member of the North Dakota House of Representatives from the 39th District, serving since 1992. He is a member of the Republican party.

== Legislation ==
In January 2017, Kempenich proposed a bill titled HB No. 1203 which would prevent a driver who unintentionally injures or kills a person intentionally obstructing a roadway from being held liable for any damages. He said the bill was in response to the Dakota Access Pipeline protests blocking a nearby highway. It was cosponsored by other state representatives and senators, and drew criticism on the grounds that it would violate the First Amendment rights of protestors. Opponents said it would effectively legalize running over protesters on the road, as long as criminal intent cannot be demonstrated on the part of the driver. The bill was defeated by a 50–41 vote on February 13.

In February, 2021, he filed legislation in committee Thursday that would compensate state legislators from outside Bismarck for meals consumed while in session. According to a parliamentary estimate, it would cost taxpayers around $424,000.
