= Greg Stemen =

American politician

Member of the North Dakota House of Representatives from the 27th district
- Incumbent
- Assumed office December 1, 2020 Serving with Vacant
- Preceded by: Thomas Beadle

Personal details
- Party: Republican
- Education: Valley City State University (BS); Southwest Minnesota State University (MS)

Greg Stemen is an American politician. He is serving as a member of the North Dakota House of Representatives from the 27th district. He is a member of the Republican Party.
