= Mike Schatz (politician) =

American politician (born 1952)

Member of the North Dakota House of Representatives
- Incumbent
- Assumed office 2008
- Constituency: 36th district (2008–2022); 39th district (2022–present)

Personal details
- Born: March 28, 1952 (age 74) New England, North Dakota, U.S.
- Party: Republican
- Education: Minot State University (BS)

Mike Schatz (born March 28, 1952) is an American politician. He is a member of the North Dakota House of Representatives from the 39th District, serving since 2008. He is a member of the Republican party. Schatz also served in the House from 1988 to 1990.
