= Dwight Kiefert =

American politician (born 1960)

Member of the North Dakota House of Representatives from the 24th district
- Incumbent
- Assumed office 2013

Personal details
- Born: September 1, 1960 (age 65) Valley City, North Dakota
- Party: Republican
- Spouse: Robbin
- Children: three
- Profession: Farmer, Contractor

Dwight Kiefert (born September 1, 1960) is an American politician. He has served as a Republican member for the 24th district in the North Dakota House of Representatives since 2013.
