= North Dakota House of Representatives =

Lower house of U.S. state legislature

Coordinates: 46°49′15″N 100°46′57″W

- 69th North Dakota Legislative Assembly

Type
- Type: Lower house
- Term limits: Two four-year terms (counting from 2022)

History
- New session started: January 5, 2025

Leadership
- Speaker: Robin Weisz (R) since January 7, 2025
- Majority Leader: Mike Lefor (R) since December 5, 2022
- Minority Leader: Zac Ista (D) since April 30, 2023

Structure
- Seats: 94
- Political groups: Majority: Republican (83); Minority: Democratic-NPL (11)
- Length of term: 4 years
- Authority: Article IV, North Dakota Constitution
- Salary: $148/session day + per diem

Elections
- Last election: November 5, 2024 (47 seats)
- Next election: November 3, 2026 (47 seats)
- Redistricting: Legislative Control

Meeting place
- House of Representatives Chamber; North Dakota State Capitol; Bismarck, North Dakota

Website
- North Dakota Legislative Assembly

The North Dakota House of Representatives is the lower house of the North Dakota Legislative Assembly and is larger than the North Dakota Senate.

North Dakota is divided into between 40 and 54 legislative districts apportioned by population as determined by the decennial census. The 2000 redistricting plan provided for 47 districts. As each district elects two Representatives to the House, there are currently 94 representatives in the House.

Representatives serve four-year terms. Elections are staggered such that half the districts have elections every two years. Originally, the North Dakota Constitution limited members of the North Dakota House of Representatives to two-year terms, with all representatives standing for reelection at the same time. That practice continued until 1996, when the voters approved a constitutional amendment that changed the term for representatives to four-years with staggered terms. The amendment went into effect July 1, 1997, and was first applied in the 1998 elections. Every two years half the districts elect both their representatives by block voting. In the 2022 North Dakota elections, a ballot measure passed with 63.4% of the vote creating term limits of eight years in the North Dakota House, which was put into effect starting January 2023.

The House Chamber is located in the North Dakota State Capitol in Bismarck, North Dakota.

== Composition of the House ==
North Dakota House Districts as of 2003. House district boundaries are identical to the North Dakota Senate's districts, with two representatives elected from each district.

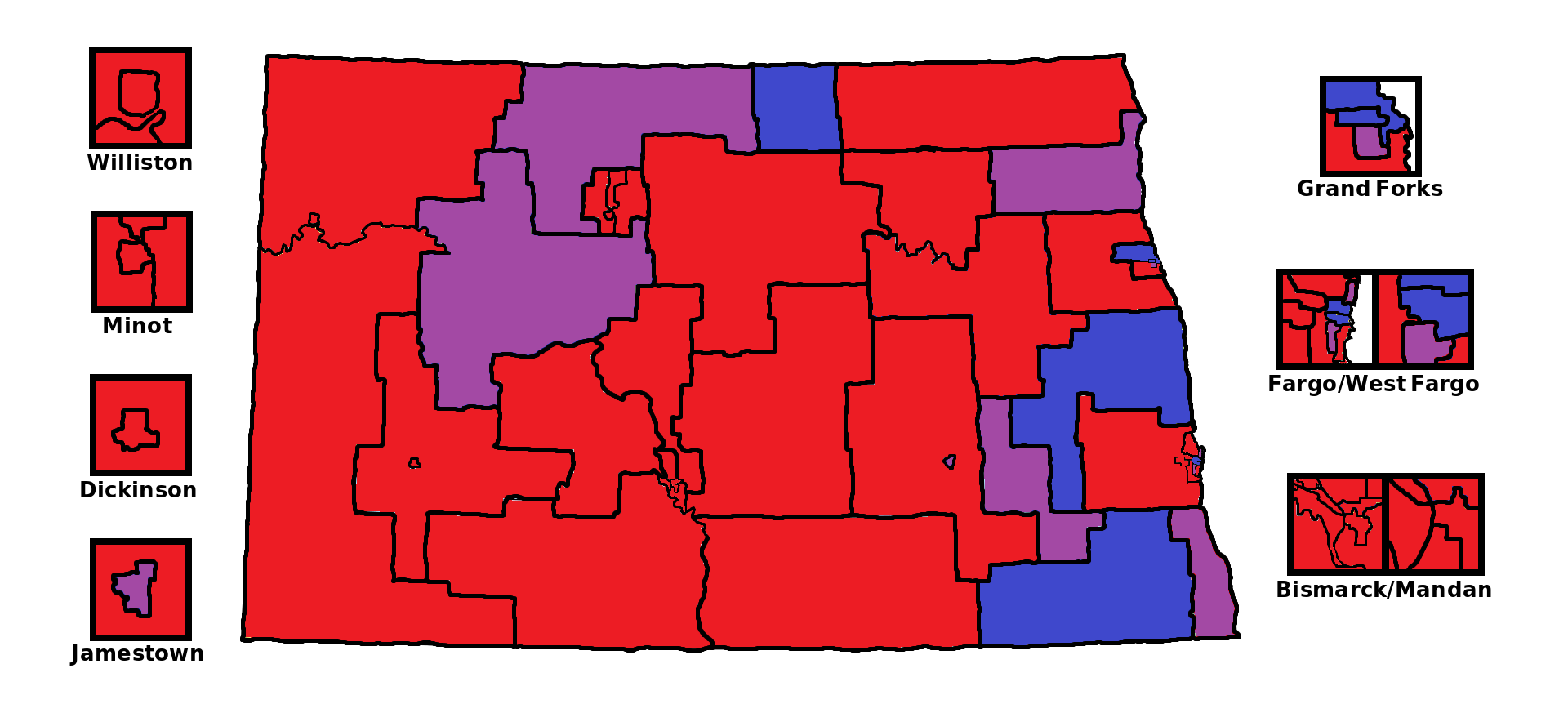
The North Dakota State House by district (as of 2016). Red is 2 Republicans, blue is 2 Democrats/NPL, and purple is one of each

Affiliation	Party (Shading indicates majority caucus)		Total	Vacant
Affiliation	Republican	Democratic-NPL	Total	Vacant
65th Legislative Assembly	81	13	94	0
66th Legislative Assembly	78	15	93	1
67th Legislative Assembly	80	14	94	0
68th Legislative Assembly	82	12	94	0
69th Legislative Assembly	83	11	94	0
Latest voting share	88.3%	11.7%		

=== 2024–2025 officers ===
Position	Name	Party	District
Speaker of the House	Robin Weisz	Republican	14
Majority Leader	Mike Lefor	Republican	37
Assistant Majority Leader	Glenn Bosch	Republican	30
Majority Caucus Chair	Jeremy Olson	Republican	26
Minority Leader	Zachary Ista	Democratic–NPL	43
Assistant Minority Leader	Gretchen Dobervich	Democratic–NPL	11
Minority Caucus Chair	Jayme Davis	Democratic–NPL	9

=== Members of the 69th House ===
The below individuals are members of the North Dakota House of Representatives for the 69th Legislative Assembly (2025–2027).

District	Name	Party	Residence	Start	Term Limited
1	Patrick Hatlestad	Republican	Williston	2006	No
1	David Richter	Republican	Williston	2018	No
2	Bert Anderson	Republican	Crosby	2014 (Note: Originally appointed.)	No
2	Donald Longmuir	Republican	Stanley	2016	No
3	Jeff Hoverson	Republican	Minot	2018	No
3	Lori VanWinkle	Republican	Minot	2022	No
4A	Lisa Finley-DeVille	Democratic-NPL	New Town	2022	No
4B	Clayton Fegley	Republican	Berthold	2018	No
5	Jay Fisher	Republican	Minot	2018	No
5	Scott Louser	Republican	Minot	2010	No
6	Dick Anderson	Republican	Willow City	2010	No
6	Daniel R. Vollmer	Republican	Willow City	2024	No
7	Jason Dockter	Republican	Bismarck	2012	No
7	Matt Heilman	Republican	Bismarck	2022	No
8	Mike Berg	Republican	Bismarck	2024	No
8	SuAnn Olson	Republican	Baldwin	2022	No
9	Collette Brown	Democratic-NPL	Warwick	2024	No
9	Jayme Davis	Democratic-NPL	Rolette	2022 (Note: Davis represented District 9A prior from 2022–2024.)	No
10	Jared Hendrix	Republican	West Fargo	2024	No
10	Steve Swiontek (Note: Swiontek previously served in the state house from 1976–1984.)	Republican	Fargo	2022	No
11	Gretchen Dobervich	Democratic-NPL	Fargo	2016	No
11	Adam Goldwyn	Democratic-NPL	Fargo	2026	No
12	Mitch Ostlie	Republican	Jamestown	2020	No
12	Bernie Satrom	Republican	Jamestown	2016	No
13	Jim Jonas	Republican	West Fargo	2022	No
13	Austen Schauer	Republican	West Fargo	2018	No
14	Jon Nelson	Republican	Rugby	1996	No
14	Robin Weisz	Republican	Hurdsfield	1996	No
15	Kathy Frelich	Republican	Devils Lake	2022	No
15	Donna Henderson	Republican	Calvin	2022 (Note: Henderson represented District 9B from 2022–2024.)	No
16	Ben Koppelman	Republican	West Fargo	2012	No
16	Andrew Marschall	Republican	Fargo	2016	No
17	Landon Bahl	Republican	Grand Forks	2022	No
17	Mark Sanford	Republican	Grand Forks	2010	No
18	Nels Christianson	Republican	Grand Forks	2024	No
18	Steve Vetter	Republican	Grand Forks	2016	No
19	Karen Anderson	Republican	Grafton	2022	No
19	David Monson	Republican	Osnabrock	1992 (Note: Monson represented District 10 from 1992–2022.)	No
20	Mike Beltz	Republican	Hillsboro	2020	No
20	Dave Rustebakke	Republican	Larimore	2026	No
21	LaurieBeth Hager	Democratic-NPL	Fargo	2018	No
21	Mary Schneider	Democratic-NPL	Fargo	2014	No
22	Brandy Pyle	Republican	Casselton	2016	No
22	Jonathan Warrey	Republican	Casselton	2022	No
23	Dennis Nehring	Republican	Williston	2024	No
23	Nico Rios	Republican	Williston	2022	No
24	Daniel Johnston (Note: Johnston previously served in the state house from 2017–2020.)	Republican	Kathryn	2024	No
24	Dwight Kiefert	Republican	Valley City	2012	No
25	Alisa Mitskog	Democratic-NPL	Wahpeton	2014	No
25	Kathy Skroch (Note: Skroch previously served in the state house from 2016–2022.)	Republican	Lidgerwood	2025	No
26	Roger A. Maki	Republican	Watford City	2024	No
26	Kelby Timmons (Note: Timmons previously served in the state house from 2022–2024.)	Republican	Watford City	2025	No
27	Timothy Brown	Republican	Fargo	2025	No
27	Greg Stemen	Republican	Fargo	2020	No
28	Michael Brandenburg (Note: Brandenburg previously served in the state house from 1998–2002.)	Republican	Edgeley	2004	No
28	Jim Grueneich (Note: Grueneich previously served in the state house from 2016–2020.)	Republican	Ellendale	2022	No
29	Craig Headland	Republican	Montpelier	2002	No
29	Don Vigesaa	Republican	Cooperstown	2002 (Note: Vigesaa represented District 23 from 2002–2022.)	No
30	Glenn Bosch	Republican	Bismarck	2016	No
30	Mike Nathe	Republican	Bismarck	2008	No
31	Dawson Holle	Republican	Mandan	2022	No
31	Karen Rohr	Republican	Mott	2010	No
32	Pat Heinert	Republican	Bismarck	2016	No
32	Lisa Meier	Republican	Bismarck	2008	No
33	Anna Novak	Republican	Hazen	2022	No
33	Bill Tveit	Republican	Hazen	2018	No
34	Todd Porter	Republican	Mandan	1998	No
34	Nathan Toman	Republican	Mandan	2012	No
35	Karen Karls	Republican	Bismarck	2006	No
35	Bob Martinson (Note: Martinson previously served in the state house from 1972–1996.)	Republican	Bismarck	2000	No
36	Ty Dressler	Republican	Richardton	2024	No
36	Dori Hauck	Republican	Hebron	2021	No
37	Mike Lefor	Republican	Dickinson	2014	No
37	Vicky Steiner	Republican	Dickinson	2010	No
38	Dan Ruby	Republican	Minot	2000	No
38	Christina Wolff	Republican	Minot	2024	No
39	Keith Kempenich	Republican	Bowman	1992	No
39	Mike Schatz	Republican	New England	2008 (Note: Schatz represented District 36 from 2008–2022.)	No
40	Macy Bolinske	Republican	Minot	2024	No
40	Matthew Ruby	Republican	Minot	2016	No
41	Karen Grindberg	Republican	Fargo	2024	No
41	Jorin Johnson	Republican	Fargo	2022	No
42	Dustin McNally	Republican	Grand Forks	2025	No
42	Doug Osowski	Republican	Grand Forks	2024	No
43	Zachary Ista	Democratic-NPL	Grand Forks	2020	No
43	Eric Murphy	Republican	Grand Forks	2022	No
44	Austin Foss	Democratic-NPL	Fargo	2024	No
44	Karla Hanson	Democratic-NPL	Fargo	2016	No
45	Carrie McLeod	Republican	Fargo	2022	No
45	Scott Wagner	Republican	Fargo	2022	No
46	Jim Kasper	Republican	Fargo	2000	No
46	Desiree Morton	Republican	Fargo	2024	No
47	Lawrence Klemin	Republican	Bismarck	1998	No
47	Mike Motschenbacher	Republican	Bismarck	2022	No

== See also ==
- List of speakers of the North Dakota House of Representatives
- List of majority leaders of the North Dakota House of Representatives
- List of North Dakota Legislative Assemblies
