= 2024 North Dakota House of Representatives election =

- November 5, 2024

51 of the 94 seats in the North Dakota House of Representatives 48 seats needed for a majority
| | Majority party | Minority party |
|---|---|---|
| Leader | Dennis Johnson (retired) | Zac Ista |
| Party | Republican | Democratic–NPL |
| Leader's seat | 15th | 43rd |
| Seats before | 82 | 12 |
| Seats after | 83 | 11 |
| Seat change | ▲1 | ▼1 |
| Popular vote | 229,328 | 65,674 |
| Percentage | 77.11% | 22.08% |
- Results: Republican gain Democratic-NPL gain Republican hold Democratic-NPL hold No election
Speaker before election
Dennis Johnson
Republican
Elected Speaker
Robin Weisz
Republican

The 2024 North Dakota House of Representatives elections were held on November 5, 2024, as part of the biennial 2024 United States elections.

== Background ==
=== Partisanship ===
In the 2020 presidential election, Donald Trump won the most votes in 41 of North Dakota's legislative districts and Democrat Joe Biden won 7. Out of the 25 districts with elections in 2024, Donald Trump won the most votes in 20 districts and Joe Biden won the most votes in 5. There are 3 Biden-won districts where Republicans held at least one seat going into the 2024 House of Representatives election: District 9 (Biden+21); Fargo-based District 46 (Biden+0.2); and Fargo-based District 10 (Biden+4). There is one Trump-won district where Democrats hold one seat going into the 2024 House of Representatives election: Grand-Forks-based District 18 (Trump+3).

Biden 40–50% 50–60% 60–70% / Trump 40–50% 50–60% 60–70% 70–80% 80–90%

=== Redistricting ===
In January 2024, Federal District Court Judge Peter Welte required North Dakota to substantially alter Legislative District 9 in response to a lawsuit by the Turtle Mountain Band of Chippewa Indians and the Spirit Lake Tribe. The tribes alleged that the House of Representatives districts established by the North Dakota legislature violated the voting rights act by preventing members of the Spirit Lake Tribe from electing a candidate of their choice to the legislature. The court-ordered new District 9, which the Turtle Mountain and Spirit Lake tribes had proposed, includes both the Turtle Mountain and Spirit Lake reservations. Special elections were held in the altered Districts—9, 15, and 23—to fill unexpired terms.

=== Predictions ===
| Source | Ranking | As of |
|---|---|---|
| CNalysis | Solid R | May 14, 2024 |

== Retirements ==
=== Democrats ===
1. District 18: Corey Mock is retiring.
2. District 44: Joshua Boschee is retiring to run for State Senate.

=== Republicans ===
1. District 6: Paul Thomas is retiring to run for State Senate.
2. District 15: Dennis Johnson is retiring.
3. District 24: Rose Christensen is retiring.
4. District 36: Gary Kreidt is retiring.
5. District 38: JoAnne Rademacher is retiring.
6. District 40: Clara Sue Price is retiring.
7. District 42: Claire Cory is retiring to run for State Senate.
8. District 46: Shannon Roers Jones is retiring.

== Incumbents defeated ==
=== In primary election ===
Two incumbent representatives, both Republicans, were defeated in the June 11 primary election.

==== Republicans ====
1. District 8: Brandon Prichard lost renomination to Mike Berg and fellow incumbent SuAnn Olson.
2. District 26: Kelby Timmons lost renomination to Roger A. Maki and Jeremy Olson.

=== Democrats ===
1. District 10: Hamida Dakane lost to Republican Jared Hendrix.

== Detailed results ==
Primary Election Results Source:

- Note: Districts where there was not a competitive primary and every candidate who ran advanced to the general election are not listed.

General Election Results Source:

=== District 2 ===
==== Republican primary election ====
2024 North Dakota House of Representatives District 2 Republican primary election
| Party | Candidate | Votes | % |
|---|---|---|---|
| Republican | Bert Anderson (incumbent) | 1,275 | 29.00 |
| Republican | Donald Longmuir (incumbent) | 1,254 | 28.53 |
| Republican | Alexa Althoff | 1,150 | 26.16 |
| Republican | Charles Ringwall | 711 | 16.17 |
| Write-in | | 6 | 0.14 |
| Total votes | | 4,396 | 100.00 |

==== General election ====
2024 North Dakota House of Representatives District 2 general election
| Party | Candidate | Votes | % |
|---|---|---|---|
| Republican | Donald Longmuir (incumbent) | 5,804 | 41.96 |
| Republican | Bert Anderson (incumbent) | 5,678 | 41.05 |
| Democratic–NPL | Betty Dhuyvetter | 1,159 | 8.38 |
| Democratic–NPL | Gene Nygaard | 1,084 | 7.84 |
| Write-in | | 106 | 0.77 |
| Total votes | | 13,831 | 100.00 |
| Republican hold | | | |
| Republican hold | | | |

=== District 4A ===
General election

2024 North Dakota House of Representatives District 4A general election
| Party | Candidate | Votes | % |
|---|---|---|---|
| Democratic–NPL | Lisa Finley-DeVille (incumbent) | 1,627 | 63.53 |
| Republican | Ronald Brugh | 919 | 35.88 |
| Write-in | | 15 | 0.59 |
| Total votes | | 2,561 | 100.00 |
| Democratic–NPL hold | | | |

=== District 4B ===
General election

2024 North Dakota House of Representatives District 4B general election
| Party | Candidate | Votes | % |
|---|---|---|---|
| Republican | Clayton Fegley (incumbent) | 3,857 | 98.90 |
| Write-in | | 43 | 1.10 |
| Total votes | | 3,900 | 100.00 |
| Republican hold | | | |

=== District 6 ===
==== Republican primary election ====
2024 North Dakota House of Representatives District 6 Republican primary election
| Party | Candidate | Votes | % |
|---|---|---|---|
| Republican | Dick Anderson (incumbent) | 2,034 | 29.01 |
| Republican | Dan Vollmer | 1,991 | 28.39 |
| Republican | Pat Bachmeier | 1,533 | 21.86 |
| Republican | Kolette Kramer | 1,436 | 20.48 |
| Write-in | | 18 | 0.26 |
| Total votes | | 7,012 | 100.00 |

==== General election ====
2024 North Dakota House of Representatives District 6 general election
| Party | Candidate | Votes | % |
|---|---|---|---|
| Republican | Dick Anderson (incumbent) | 6,532 | 49.66 |
| Republican | Dan Vollmer | 6,382 | 48.52 |
| Write-in | | 239 | 1.82 |
| Total votes | | 13,153 | 100.00 |
| Republican hold | | | |
| Republican hold | | | |

=== District 8 ===
==== Republican primary election ====
2024 North Dakota House of Representatives District 8 Republican primary election
| Party | Candidate | Votes | % |
|---|---|---|---|
| Republican | Mike Berg | 1,671 | 28.04 |
| Republican | SuAnn Olson | 1,620 | 27.18 |
| Republican | Brandon Prichard (incumbent) | 1,586 | 26.61 |
| Republican | Ken Rensch | 1,069 | 17.94 |
| Write-in | | 14 | 0.23 |
| Total votes | | 5,960 | 100.00 |

==== General election ====
2024 North Dakota House of Representatives District 8 general election
| Party | Candidate | Votes | % |
|---|---|---|---|
| Republican | Mike Berg | 8,066 | 54.75 |
| Republican | SuAnn Olson (incumbent) | 6,480 | 43.99 |
| Write-in | | 186 | 1.26 |
| Total votes | | 14,732 | 100.00 |
| Republican hold | | | |
| Republican hold | | | |

=== District 9 (special) ===
General election

2024 North Dakota House of Representatives District 9 special general election
| Party | Candidate | Votes | % |
|---|---|---|---|
| Democratic–NPL | Jayme Davis (incumbent) | 3,032 | 32.18 |
| Democratic–NPL | Collette Brown | 2,302 | 24.43 |
| Republican | David Brien | 2,266 | 24.05 |
| Republican | Robert Graywater | 1,817 | 19.29 |
| Write-in | | 4 | 0.04 |
| Total votes | | 9,421 | 100.00 |
| Democratic–NPL hold | | | |
| Democratic–NPL gain from Republican | | | |

=== District 10 ===
General election

2024 North Dakota House of Representatives District 10 general election
| Party | Candidate | Votes | % |
|---|---|---|---|
| Republican | Steve Swiontek (incumbent) | 3,132 | 34.31 |
| Republican | Jared Hendrix | 3,054 | 33.45 |
| Democratic–NPL | Hamida Dakane (incumbent) | 2,873 | 31.47 |
| Write-in | | 70 | 0.77 |
| Total votes | | 9,129 | 100.00 |
| Republican hold | | | |
| Republican gain from Democratic–NPL | | | |

=== District 12 ===
General election

2024 North Dakota House of Representatives District 12 general election
| Party | Candidate | Votes | % |
|---|---|---|---|
| Republican | Mitch Ostlie (incumbent) | 4,376 | 49.56 |
| Republican | Bernie Satrom (incumbent) | 4,360 | 49.38 |
| Write-in | | 94 | 1.06 |
| Total votes | | 8,830 | 100.00 |
| Republican hold | | | |
| Republican hold | | | |

=== District 14 ===
==== Republican primary election ====
2024 North Dakota House of Representatives District 14 Republican primary election
| Party | Candidate | Votes | % |
|---|---|---|---|
| Republican | Robin Weisz (incumbent) | 2,215 | 28.70 |
| Republican | Jon Nelson (incumbent) | 2,004 | 25.97 |
| Republican | Jason Steidl | 1,857 | 24.06 |
| Republican | Larry Danduran | 1,639 | 21.24 |
| Write-in | | 2 | 0.03 |
| Total votes | | 7,717 | 100.00 |

==== General election ====
2024 North Dakota House of Representatives District 14 general election
| Party | Candidate | Votes | % |
|---|---|---|---|
| Republican | Jon Nelson (incumbent) | 6,271 | 39.21 |
| Republican | Robin Weisz (incumbent) | 6,271 | 39.21 |
| Democratic–NPL | Cathy Jelsing | 1,723 | 10.77 |
| Democratic–NPL | Jessica Hawkes | 1,605 | 10.04 |
| Write-in | | 123 | 0.77 |
| Total votes | | 15,993 | 100.00 |
| Republican hold | | | |
| Republican hold | | | |

=== District 15 (special) ===
General election

2024 North Dakota House of Representatives District 15 special general election
| Party | Candidate | Votes | % |
|---|---|---|---|
| Republican | Kathy Frelich (incumbent) | 5,712 | 56.23 |
| Republican | Donna Henderson (incumbent) | 4,354 | 42.86 |
| Write-in | | 93 | 0.92 |
| Total votes | | 10,159 | 100.00 |
| Republican hold | | | |
| Republican hold | | | |

=== District 16 ===
General election

2024 North Dakota House of Representatives District 16 general election
| Party | Candidate | Votes | % |
|---|---|---|---|
| Republican | Ben Koppelman (incumbent) | 4,736 | 32.54 |
| Republican | Andrew Marschall (incumbent) | 3,910 | 26.87 |
| Democratic–NPL | Julie West | 3,266 | 22.44 |
| Democratic–NPL | Phil Weiss | 2,619 | 18.00 |
| Write-in | | 22 | 0.15 |
| Total votes | | 14,553 | 100.00 |
| Republican hold | | | |
| Republican hold | | | |

=== District 18 ===
General election

2024 North Dakota House of Representatives District 18 general election
| Party | Candidate | Votes | % |
|---|---|---|---|
| Republican | Steve Vetter (incumbent) | 3,465 | 29.72 |
| Republican | Nels Christianson | 2,837 | 24.34 |
| Democratic–NPL | Mary Adams | 2,779 | 23.84 |
| Democratic–NPL | Scott Nelson | 2,562 | 21.98 |
| Write-in | | 14 | 0.12 |
| Total votes | | 11,657 | 100.00 |
| Republican hold | | | |
| Republican gain from Democratic–NPL | | | |

=== District 20 ===
General election

2024 North Dakota House of Representatives District 20 general election
| Party | Candidate | Votes | % |
|---|---|---|---|
| Republican | Mike Beltz (incumbent) | 6,107 | 52.80 |
| Republican | Jared Hagert (incumbent) | 5,319 | 45.98 |
| Write-in | | 141 | 1.22 |
| Total votes | | 11,567 | 100.00 |
| Republican hold | | | |
| Republican hold | | | |

=== District 22 ===
General election

2024 North Dakota House of Representatives District 22 general election
| Party | Candidate | Votes | % |
|---|---|---|---|
| Republican | Brandy Pyle (incumbent) | 6,890 | 43.14 |
| Republican | Jonathan Warrey (incumbent) | 6,154 | 38.53 |
| Democratic–NPL | Darrell Hansen | 2,823 | 17.68 |
| Write-in | | 103 | 0.64 |
| Total votes | | 15,970 | 100.00 |
| Republican hold | | | |
| Republican hold | | | |

=== District 23 (special) ===
General election

2024 North Dakota House of Representatives District 23 special election
| Party | Candidate | Votes | % |
|---|---|---|---|
| Republican | Dennis Nehring (incumbent) | 3,892 | 83.72 |
| Democratic–NPL | Mark Casler | 735 | 15.81 |
| Write-in | | 22 | 0.47 |
| Total votes | | 4,649 | 100.00 |
| Republican hold | | | |

=== District 24 ===
General election

2024 North Dakota House of Representatives District 24 general election
| Party | Candidate | Votes | % |
|---|---|---|---|
| Republican | Dwight Kiefert (incumbent) | 4,779 | 32.98 |
| Republican | Daniel Johnston | 4,198 | 28.97 |
| Democratic–NPL | Nancy Farnham | 2,830 | 19.53 |
| Democratic–NPL | Shawn Olauson | 2,669 | 18.42 |
| Write-in | | 16 | 0.11 |
| Total votes | | 14,492 | 100.00 |
| Republican hold | | | |
| Republican hold | | | |

=== District 26 ===
==== Republican primary election ====
2024 North Dakota House of Representatives District 26 Republican primary election
| Party | Candidate | Votes | % |
|---|---|---|---|
| Republican | Jeremy Olson | 1,280 | 36.63 |
| Republican | Roger Maki | 1,110 | 31.77 |
| Republican | Kelby Timmons (incumbent) | 1,097 | 31.40 |
| Write-in | | 7 | 0.20 |
| Total votes | | 3,494 | 100.00 |

==== General election ====
2024 North Dakota House of Representatives District 26 general election
| Party | Candidate | Votes | % |
|---|---|---|---|
| Republican | Jeremy Olson | 4,774 | 52.95 |
| Republican | Roger Maki | 4,138 | 45.90 |
| Write-in | | 104 | 1.15 |
| Total votes | | 9,016 | 100.00 |
| Republican hold | | | |
| Republican hold | | | |

=== District 28 ===
General election

2024 North Dakota House of Representatives District 28 general election
| Party | Candidate | Votes | % |
|---|---|---|---|
| Republican | Mike Brandenburg (incumbent) | 6,319 | 38.86 |
| Republican | Jim Grueneich | 5,884 | 36.18 |
| Democratic–NPL | Mary Schlosser | 2,163 | 13.30 |
| Democratic–NPL | Sara Dux | 1,864 | 11.46 |
| Write-in | | 32 | 0.20 |
| Total votes | | 16,262 | 100.00 |
| Republican hold | | | |
| Republican hold | | | |

=== District 30 ===
==== Republican primary election ====
2024 North Dakota House of Representatives District 30 Republican primary election
| Party | Candidate | Votes | % |
|---|---|---|---|
| Republican | Mike Nathe (incumbent) | 1,363 | 31.36 |
| Republican | Glenn Bosch (incumbent) | 1,345 | 30.95 |
| Republican | Justin Amundson | 845 | 19.44 |
| Republican | David Charles | 785 | 18.06 |
| Write-in | | 8 | 0.18 |
| Total votes | | 4,346 | 100.00 |

==== General election ====
2024 North Dakota House of Representatives District 30 general election
| Party | Candidate | Votes | % |
|---|---|---|---|
| Republican | Glenn Bosch (incumbent) | 5,539 | 51.49 |
| Republican | Mike Nathe (incumbent) | 5,001 | 46.49 |
| Write-in | | 217 | 2.02 |
| Total votes | | 10,757 | 100.00 |
| Republican hold | | | |
| Republican hold | | | |

=== District 32 ===
==== Republican primary election ====
2024 North Dakota House of Representatives District 32 Republican primary election
| Party | Candidate | Votes | % |
|---|---|---|---|
| Republican | Lisa Meier (incumbent) | 1,142 | 39.22 |
| Republican | Pat Heinert (incumbent) | 1,066 | 36.61 |
| Republican | Phillip Jacobs | 693 | 23.80 |
| Write-in | | 11 | 0.38 |
| Total votes | | 2,912 | 100.00 |

==== General election ====
2024 North Dakota House of Representatives District 32 general election
| Party | Candidate | Votes | % |
|---|---|---|---|
| Republican | Lisa Meier (incumbent) | 4,700 | 39.31 |
| Republican | Pat Heinert (incumbent) | 4,695 | 39.27 |
| Democratic–NPL | Shari Orser | 2,466 | 20.63 |
| Write-in | | 94 | 0.79 |
| Total votes | | 11,955 | 100.00 |
| Republican hold | | | |
| Republican hold | | | |

=== District 34 ===
==== Republican primary election ====
2024 North Dakota House of Representatives District 34 Republican primary election
| Party | Candidate | Votes | % |
|---|---|---|---|
| Republican | Nathan Toman (incumbent) | 1,777 | 43.09 |
| Republican | Todd Porter (incumbent) | 1,616 | 39.19 |
| Republican | David Villafana | 722 | 17.51 |
| Write-in | | 9 | 0.22 |
| Total votes | | 4,124 | 100.00 |

==== General election ====
2024 North Dakota House of Representatives District 34 general election
| Party | Candidate | Votes | % |
|---|---|---|---|
| Republican | Todd Porter (incumbent) | 5,573 | 51.58 |
| Republican | Nathan Toman (incumbent) | 5,103 | 47.23 |
| Write-in | | 129 | 1.19 |
| Total votes | | 10,805 | 100.00 |
| Republican hold | | | |
| Republican hold | | | |

=== District 36 ===
General election

2024 North Dakota House of Representatives District 36 general election
| Party | Candidate | Votes | % |
|---|---|---|---|
| Republican | Ty Dressler | 5,281 | 53.85 |
| Republican | Dori Hauck (incumbent) | 4,472 | 45.60 |
| Write-in | | 54 | 0.55 |
| Total votes | | 9,807 | 100.00 |
| Republican hold | | | |
| Republican hold | | | |

=== District 38 ===
==== Republican primary election ====
2024 North Dakota House of Representatives District 38 Republican primary election
| Party | Candidate | Votes | % |
|---|---|---|---|
| Republican | Dan Ruby (incumbent) | 1,404 | 42.82 |
| Republican | Christina Wolff (incumbent) | 1,020 | 31.11 |
| Republican | Lisa Olson | 845 | 25.77 |
| Write-in | | 10 | 0.30 |
| Total votes | | 3,279 | 100.00 |

==== General election ====
2024 North Dakota House of Representatives District 38 general election
| Party | Candidate | Votes | % |
|---|---|---|---|
| Republican | Dan Ruby (incumbent) | 5,009 | 42.87 |
| Republican | Christina Wolff | 4,919 | 42.10 |
| Democratic–NPL | Lisa Hermosillo | 1,713 | 14.66 |
| Write-in | | 43 | 0.37 |
| Total votes | | 11,684 | 100.00 |
| Republican hold | | | |
| Republican hold | | | |

=== District 40 ===
General election

2024 North Dakota House of Representatives District 40 general election
| Party | Candidate | Votes | % |
|---|---|---|---|
| Republican | Matthew Ruby (incumbent) | 3,211 | 42.22 |
| Republican | Macy Bolinske | 2,918 | 38.37 |
| Democratic–NPL | Alexandra Deufel | 1,441 | 18.95 |
| Write-in | | 35 | 0.46 |
| Total votes | | 7,605 | 100.00 |
| Republican hold | | | |
| Republican hold | | | |

=== District 42 ===
==== Republican primary election ====
2024 North Dakota House of Representatives District 38 Republican primary election
| Party | Candidate | Votes | % |
|---|---|---|---|
| Republican | Doug Osowski (incumbent) | 425 | 41.63 |
| Republican | Emily O'Brien (incumbent) | 301 | 29.48 |
| Republican | Sadie Hanson | 290 | 28.40 |
| Write-in | | 5 | 0.49 |
| Total votes | | 1,021 | 100.00 |

==== General election ====
2024 North Dakota House of Representatives District 42 general election
| Party | Candidate | Votes | % |
|---|---|---|---|
| Republican | Doug Osowski | 2,654 | 31.41 |
| Republican | Emily O'Brien (incumbent) | 2,422 | 28.67 |
| Democratic–NPL | Sarah Grossbauer | 1,687 | 19.97 |
| Democratic–NPL | Carol Hagen | 1,667 | 19.73 |
| Write-in | | 19 | 0.22 |
| Total votes | | 8,449 | 100.00 |
| Republican hold | | | |
| Republican hold | | | |

=== District 44 ===
General election

2024 North Dakota House of Representatives District 44 general election
| Party | Candidate | Votes | % |
|---|---|---|---|
| Democratic–NPL | Karla Rose Hanson (incumbent) | 4,774 | 51.24 |
| Democratic–NPL | Austin Foss | 4,209 | 45.18 |
| Write-in | | 334 | 3.58 |
| Total votes | | 9,317 | 100.00 |
| Democratic–NPL hold | | | |
| Democratic–NPL hold | | | |

=== District 46 ===
General election

2024 North Dakota House of Representatives District 46 general election
| Party | Candidate | Votes | % |
|---|---|---|---|
| Republican | Jim Kasper (incumbent) | 4,634 | 27.03 |
| Republican | Desiree Morton | 4,464 | 26.04 |
| Democratic–NPL | Todd Reisenauer | 4,042 | 23.58 |
| Democratic–NPL | Will Thompson | 3,960 | 23.10 |
| Write-in | | 42 | 0.25 |
| Total votes | | 17,142 | 100.00 |
| Republican hold | | | |
| Republican hold | | | |
