= Abortion in North Dakota =

Abortion in North Dakota is generally illegal. There are exceptions for medical necessity, rape or incest when performed before 6 weeks, or if an individual assisting was unaware of performing an illegal abortion.

Following the United States Supreme Court's landmark ruling to overturn Roe v. Wade on June 24, 2022, the state's trigger law, HB 1466, was blocked by the district court, which was upheld by the North Dakota Supreme Court. SB 2150 was passed in response to this, making performance of an abortion is a Class C felony subject to a maximum penalty of five years' imprisonment, a $10,000 fine, or both. In 2024, Judge Bruce Romanick overturned the state's abortion ban.

In November 2025, the state Supreme Court restored the abortion ban.

== History ==
=== Legislative history ===
By 1950, the state legislature had passed a law stating that a woman who had an abortion or actively sought to have an abortion regardless of whether she went through with it was guilty of a criminal offense.

The state was one of 23 states in 2007 to have a detailed abortion-specific informed consent requirement. Mississippi, Nebraska, North Dakota and Ohio all had statutes in 2007 that required specific informed consent on abortion but also, by statute, allowed medical doctors performing abortions to disassociate themselves with the anti-abortion materials they were required to provide to their female patients. North Dakota's informed consent materials included a definition for fetus stating it is "a Latin word meaning young one or offspring". According to North Dakota's materials, at 10 weeks, the fetus "now has a distinct human appearance" and "eyelids are formed". The materials say at 14 weeks, the fetus "is able to swallow" and "sleeps and awakens".

North Dakota's HB 1572, otherwise known as the Personhood of Children Act, was a bill in the North Dakota Legislature which aimed to "provide equality and rights to all human beings at every stage of biological development". This step could have eventually eliminated all types of abortion for nearly any reason in the state of North Dakota. It would have allocated rights to “the pre-born, partially born”. If it had passed, it would have likely been used to challenge Roe v. Wade.

In March 2013, Governor Jack Dalrymple of North Dakota signed into law a bill presented to him by the legislature that would have banned abortions in the state six weeks after a woman's first missed period (North Dakota HB 1456). Only North Dakota successfully passed a such a "fetal heartbeat" law that year, although it was later struck down by the courts. Gov. Dalrymple stated that it was "a legitimate attempt by a state legislature to discover the boundaries of Roe v. Wade". In 2013, state Targeted Regulation of Abortion Providers (TRAP) had provisions related to admitting privileges and licensing. They required clinics have hospital privileges. The state had a law on the books as of August 2018 that would be triggered if Roe v. Wade was overturned. As of mid-May 2019, abortion in North Dakota was banned after week 22.

Abortion in North Dakota remained legal following the United States' Supreme Court ruling to overturn Roe v. Wade on June 24, 2022. The state has a trigger law from 2007, banning all abortions, which has been blocked by a court since July. Under the trigger law, performance of an abortion is a Class C felony subject to a maximum penalty of five years' imprisonment, a $10,000 fine, or both. The person performing the abortion who is charged under the law can only be excused from criminal liability by proving one of the following affirmative defenses: the abortion was necessary to prevent the death of the mother, the pregnancy resulted from rape or incest, or the individual performing the abortion was acting in the scope of his or her regulated profession and under the direction of a physician. A state district court issued a preliminary injunction preventing enforcement of the law while the court is deciding the merits of the case.

On January 6 2023, Janne Myrdal, Keith Boehm, Larry Luick, Todd Porter (politician), Karen Rohr and Matthew Ruby introduced SB 2150 as an "emergency measure", banning all abortions with exception for health of the pregnant person, and rape or incest when under 6 weeks. It became law April 26, 2023 and is the current basis for North Dakota’s abortion ban.

In January 2025, State Representative Lori VanWinkle proposed House Bill 1373, which would have effectively outlawed abortion in all instances by codifying into law the definition of person in relation to murder, assault, and wrongful death as including the unborn child. The bill was voted down 16-77.

=== Judicial history ===
The U.S. Supreme Court's decision in 1973's Roe v. Wade meant the state could no longer regulate abortion in the first trimester. (However, the Supreme Court overturned Roe v. Wade in Dobbs v. Jackson Women's Health Organization, No. 19-1392, 597 U.S. ___ (2022) later in 2022.) In July 2015 the Eighth Circuit Court of Appeals affirmed a lower court decision blocking HB 1456 (a "fetal heartbeat" law that would ban abortion from six weeks after fertilization) from going into effect. The U.S. Supreme Court declined to review the case and the law remains permanently blocked. In July 2013, a lawsuit was filed with regard to the law by the Center for Reproductive Rights (CRR), on behalf of the only abortion clinic in North Dakota, Red River Women's Clinic. In July 2015, the Eighth U.S. Circuit Court of Appeals blocked the bill. The case was appealed to the U.S. Supreme Court, but the court denied a writ of certiorari in January 2015 and let stand the decision of the Eighth Circuit Court of Appeals.

Following the 2022 Dobbs decision, Burleigh County District Judge Bruce Romanick granted a preliminary injunction on the state's trigger law on abortion, which was upheld by the North Dakota Supreme Court in 2023.

In September 2024, Judge Bruce Romanick struck down the state's new abortion ban, stating that it violated the North Dakota State Constitution. In January 2025, the North Dakota Supreme Court denied the state government's request to reinstate the total ban. In November 2025, three of the five justices on the North Dakota Supreme Court ruled that the law was "unconstitutionally vague." However, the North Dakota State Constitution requires that at least four justices join in an opinion to strike down a law, so the ban was allowed to take effect again.

=== Clinic history ===
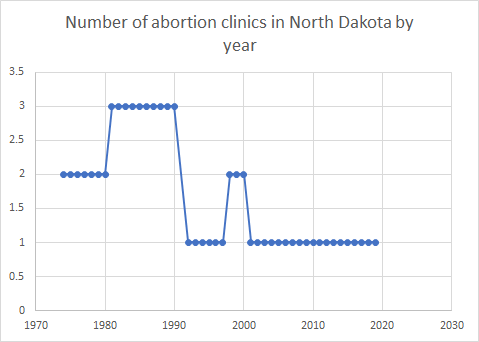
Number of abortion clinics in North Dakota by year

Following the Roe v. Wade ruling, two abortion clinics opened in the state, one in Grand Forks and one in Jamestown. Around 1981, when the doctors in Grand Forks and Jamestown were getting close to an age where they would consider retiring, they reached out to Jane Bovard and asked her to open a clinic in Fargo. Bovard had a history of supporting abortion rights in the state by assisting women in traveling to Minneapolis or cities in other states to get abortions. She agreed and with the help of Susan Hill opened a Women's Health Organization affiliate in the fall of that year. From 1981 to 1991, there were three abortion clinics in the state. In 1991, the doctors in Grand Forks and Jamestown both retired, leaving the Women's Health Organization as the only abortion provider in the state. In the period between 1992 and 1996, the state saw no change in the total number of abortion clinics. While only three states saw gains in this period, this state was one of four to see no changes with one abortion clinic in the state in 1996.

Dr. George Miks was the primary physician at the Women's Health Organization in 1993. Around 1998, he and Jane Bovard felt they could improve on the services offered by the Women's Health Organization so the pair opened a second clinic in the state called the Red River Clinic in Fargo. It officially opened on July 31, 1998. Located only six blocks apart, the two clinics were in competition with each other for about two and a half years. In February 2001, Women's Health Organization closed unexpectedly, leaving Red River Women's Clinic as the only abortion clinic in the state. Around 1998, the number of abortions performed at Red River Women's Clinic per week was around 25. By 2017, the numbers had dropped slightly to be around 20 to 25 abortions a week.

In 2008 and 2014, there was still only one abortion clinic in the state. In 2014, 98% of the counties in the state did not have an abortion clinic. That year, 73% of women in the state aged 15–44 lived in a county without an abortion clinic. In 2016, only a small section of the state required women to drive fewer than 40 miles to access an abortion clinic. In 2016 and 2017, there were no Planned Parenthood clinics in the state. As of July 21, 2017, Kentucky, Louisiana, Mississippi, North Dakota, West Virginia, and Wyoming were the only six states that did not have a Planned Parenthood clinic offering abortion services. Of these states, North Dakota and Wyoming were the only two without a Planned Parenthood clinic. In May 2019, the state was officially one of six in the nation with only one abortion clinic.

In 2022, anticipating the decision in Dobbs v. Jackson Women's Health Organization, Red River Women's Clinic chose to relocate. The state now has no abortion clinics.

== Statistics ==
In the period between 1972 and 1974, there were zero recorded illegal abortion deaths in the state. In 1990, 68,000 women in the state faced the risk of an unintended pregnancy. The lowest number of legal induced abortions by state in 2000 occurred in Idaho with 801, while South Dakota was second with 878, and North Dakota was third with 1,341. Idaho had the fewest induced abortions in 2001 with 738, while South Dakota was second with 895, and North Dakota was third with 1,216. In 2003, the state of South Dakota had the lowest number of legal induced abortions with 819. Idaho was second with 911, while North Dakota was third with 1,354. In 2010, the state had no publicly funded abortions. In 2014, 47% of adults said in a poll by the Pew Research Center that abortion should be legal in all or most cases. In 2017, the state had an infant mortality rate of 4.3 deaths per 1,000 live births.

Number of reported abortions, abortion rate and percentage change in rate by geographic region and state in 1992, 1995 and 1996
Census division and state	Number			Rate			% change 1992–1996
Census division and state	1992	1995	1996	1992	1995	1996	% change 1992–1996
West North Central	57,340	48,530	48,660	14.3	11.9	11.9	–16
Iowa	6,970	6,040	5,780	11.4	9.8	9.4	–17
Kansas	12,570	10,310	10,630	22.4	18.3	18.9	–16
Minnesota	16,180	14,910	14,660	15.6	14.2	13.9	–11
Missouri	13,510	10,540	10,810	11.6	8.9	9.1	–21
Nebraska	5,580	4,360	4,460	15.7	12.1	12.3	–22
North Dakota	1,490	1,330	1,290	10.7	9.6	9.4	–13
South Dakota	1,040	1,040	1,030	6.8	6.6	6.5	–4

Number, rate, and ratio of reported abortions, by reporting area of residence and occurrence and by percentage of abortions obtained by out-of-state residents, US CDC estimates
Location	Residence			Occurrence			% obtained by out-of-state residents	Year	Ref
Location	No.	Rate^	Ratio^^	No.	Rate^	Ratio^^	% obtained by out-of-state residents	Year	Ref
North Dakota				1,490	10.7			1992	
North Dakota				1,330	9.6			1995	
North Dakota				1,290	9.4			1996	
North Dakota	1,009	7.0	89	1,264	8.8	111	30.3	2014	
North Dakota	976	6.6	86	1,166	7.9	103	29.6	2015	
North Dakota	955	6.5	84	1,160	7.9	102	26.7	2016	
^number of abortions per women aged 15–44; ^^number of abortions per 1,000 live births

== Abortion rights views and activities ==
=== Protests ===
Women from the state participated in marches supporting abortion rights as part of a #StoptheBans movement in May 2019.

Following the overturn of Roe v. Wade on June 24, 2022, over 1,000 abortion rights protesters rallied and marched in Fargo, Bismarck and Grand Forks.

== Anti-abortion rights views and activities ==
Protesters picketed outside the home of Jane Bovard many times. She ran a well-known search service that brokered abortions for women who sought them. Anti-abortion rights activists threatened Bovard many times, including while outside her home. She responded by calling the police; her husband helped protect her by loading his shotgun.
