= Emily O'Brien (politician) =

American politician

Member of the North Dakota House of Representatives from the 42 district
- In office 2017 – August 19, 2025 Serving with Jake Blum (2016-2019); Claire Cory (2019-2024); Doug Osowski (2024-2025)
- Preceded by: Kylie Oversen; Corey Mock
- Succeeded by: Dustin McNally

Personal details
- Born: Lakeville, Minnesota, U.S.
- Party: Republican
- Domestic partner: Jake Green
- Children: 2
- Education: University of North Dakota (BA)

Emily O'Brien is an American businesswoman and politician who served as a Republican member of the North Dakota House of Representatives from the 42nd district. She served from 2016 until August 2025, when she resigned after being appointed deputy commissioner of the North Dakota Department of Health and Human Services.

== Early life and education ==
O'Brien was born in Lakeville, Minnesota, and graduated from the University of North Dakota with a degree in entrepreneurship.

== Career ==
O'Brien has served as the chief operating officer of the Bioscience Association of North Dakota since 2019 as well as on the board of directors for The Chamber of Grand Forks-East Grand Forks, the North Dakota Women’s Business Center, and the LISTEN Center.

She worked as a fellow at the University of North Dakota Center for Innovation. In 2018, she claimed the university's leadership had discriminated against her for being a Republican; an independent review conducted by a law firm found the claims were unsubstantiated.

== North Dakota House of Representatives ==
=== Elections ===
O'Brien first ran for the North Dakota House of Representatives in District 42 in 2016. While still a candidate, she was arrested for driving under the influence on July 27, 2016. She, alongside fellow Republican candidate Jake Blum defeated Democratic-NPL incumbent Kylie Oversen and candidate Grant Hauschild.

=== Tenure ===
In 2021, O'Brien accused fellow representative Luke Simons of repeated harassment and making sexually suggestive comments which forced her to move her desk in the legislative hall; the House voted overwhelmingly to expel him.

She resigned her seat effective August 19, 2025, after being appointed deputy commissioner of the North Dakota Department of Health and Human Services.

=== Ethics and residency complaints ===
In May 2024, North Dakota Ethics Commission investigated O'Brien over two complaints that she had pushed for legislation on behalf of her employer as well as introducing and voting on bills in which she had a financial interest. O'Brien supported bills which granted more than $1 million in state grants to the Bioscience Association of North Dakota, which she was the COO of, and she introduced a bill to create a sales tax exemption for the bioscience industry, materially benefiting her.

In October 2024, a neighbor filed a police report accusing O'Brien did not primarily live within District 42.

== Personal life ==
O'Brien lives with her partner, Jake Green, and their two children. She gave birth to her first child, Lennon, in February 2019 while the legislature was in session.

On July 27, 2016, O'Brien was arrested for driving under the influence. Her claimed residency in Grand Forks, North Dakota, was subject to a police report filed in October 2024. In August 2025, she stated she would move to Bismarck to work for the Heath and Human Services Department.
