= Bill Amerman =

American politician

Member of the North Dakota House of Representatives from the 26th district
- In office 2002–2016
- Succeeded by: Kathy Skroch, Sebastian Ertelt

Personal details
- Born: September 1, 1953 (age 72)
- Party: North Dakota Democratic-Nonpartisan League Party

William Amerman (born September 1, 1953) is an American politician. He was a member of the North Dakota House of Representatives from the 26th District, serving from 2002 until 2016. He is a member of the Democratic-NPL party.
