= Todd Porter =

Todd Porter may refer to:

- Todd Porter (actor) (born 1968), American model and former child actor
- Todd Porter (politician) (born 1960), member of the North Dakota House of Representatives
