= Jerry Kelsh =

American politician

Jerome Kelsh

Minority Leader of the North Dakota House of Representatives
- In office 2011–2013
- Preceded by: Merle Boucher
- Succeeded by: Kenton Onstad

Member of the North Dakota House of Representatives from the 26th district
- In office 2008–2016
- Succeeded by: Kathy Skroch; Sebastian Ertelt

Member of the North Dakota Senate from the 26th district
- In office 1984–2002

Personal details
- Born: October 25, 1940 (age 85) LaMoure, North Dakota
- Party: Democratic-NPL
- Spouse: Ramona
- Profession: Farmer, businessman

Jerome G. Kelsh (born October 25, 1940) is an American politician from North Dakota. He was a member of the North Dakota House of Representatives, representing the 26th district. A Democrat, he was first elected in 2007. He also sat in the North Dakota State Senate from 1984 to 2002.

Kelsh is an alumnus of University of North Dakota and is a farmer and retired businessman.
