= Kathy Skroch =

American politician

Member of the North Dakota House of Representatives
- Incumbent
- Assumed office August 2025 Serving with Alisa Mitskog
- Preceded by: Cindy Schreiber-Beck
- Succeeded by: Terry Goerger (elect)
- Constituency: 25th
- In office December 1, 2016 – November 2022 Serving with Sebastian Ertelt
- Succeeded by: Jeremy Olson; Kelby Timmons
- Constituency: 26th

Personal details
- Born: Browns Valley, Minnesota, U.S.
- Party: Republican
- Spouse: Michael
- Children: 7
- Education: Minnesota State Community and Technical College (CNA)

Kathy Skroch is an American politician serving as a member of the North Dakota House of Representatives from the 25th district since 2025 after being appointed to fill the late Cindy Schreiber-Beck's term. She previously served in the body from 2016 until 2022, representing the 26th district.

== Early life, education, and career ==
Skroch was born in Browns Valley, Minnesota. She earned a nursing assistant certificate from the Minnesota State Community and Technical College.

Skroch works as a certified nursing assistant. She also owns Vinnie's Mud Bog, a plot of land in Richland County, North Dakota used for off-roading.

== North Dakota House of Representatives ==
Skroch was first elected to the North Dakota House of Representatives in November 2016 and assumed office on December 1, 2016.

After redistricting placed her in the 25th district in 2022, she was defeated by incumbents Republican Cindy Schreiber-Beck and D-NPL Alisa Mitskog in the general election.

In 2025, the District 25 Republican committee appointed Skroch to fill Schreiber-Beck's term following her death. The committee originally appointed Terry Goerger, but the North Dakota Secretary of State and North Dakota Republican Party invalidated the process.
