= Robert Frantsvog =

American politician (born 1941)

Member of the North Dakota House of Representatives from the 40th district
- In office 2008–2016
- Succeeded by: Matthew Ruby

Personal details
- Born: May 27, 1941 (age 85)
- Party: Republican

Robert Frantsvog (born May 27, 1941) is an American politician who served as a member of the North Dakota House of Representatives for the 40th District from 2008 to 2016. He is a member of the Republican party.
