= Hamida Dakane =

American politician (born c. 1989)

Member of the North Dakota House of Representatives from the 10th district
- In office December 1, 2022 – December 1, 2024
- Preceded by: None (district created after redistricting)
- Succeeded by: Jared Hendrix

Personal details
- Born: c. 1989 (age 36–37) Kenya
- Party: North Dakota Democratic–Nonpartisan League Party
- Education: North Dakota State University, University of Maryland
- Occupation: Politician; community organizer

Hamida Dakane (born c. 1989) is a Kenyan-American politician who is the first Black and first Muslim person to serve in the North Dakota Legislative Assembly. She was elected in 2022 as a Democrat to represent District 10 of the North Dakota House of Representatives, centered in Fargo. She served one term, losing reelection in 2024.

== Life and career ==
Born in northeastern Kenya circa 1989 and of Somali descent, a member of the Degoodi clan, Dakane moved to the United States in 2011 on a student visa to attend North Dakota State University. She chaired the NDSU Black Student Association while studying for her bachelor's degree in emergency management and international studies. She stayed in the United States to work as a community organizer after graduation. She first ran for political office in 2020, unsuccessfully seeking to represent District 16 in the North Dakota House of Representatives.

In November 2022, Dakane was elected to represent House District 10 for a two-year term from December 1, 2022, to December 1, 2024. She represents the district alongside Rep. Steve Swiontek, a Republican. During North Dakota's 2023 legislative session, Dakane served on the Industry, Business and Labor and the Transportation standing committees and held interim appointments on the Workforce and the Agricultural and Natural Resources standing committees. Dakane and fellow state senator Kathy Hogan have sponsored mental health, childcare, and workforce development bills, most of which have been voted down by the overwhelmingly Republican state legislature. In November 2024, she narrowly lost reelection to Republican challenger Jared Hendrix and Republican incumbent Steve Swiontek, receiving 31% of the vote to Hendrix's 33% and Swiontek's 34%.

Dakane holds a Master of Public Administration from the University of Maryland. In 2018, she was appointed to serve on the Fargo Human Relations Commission. She has received the Human Rights MLK Award from the City of Fargo and been named Woman of the Year by the Fargo YWCA.

== Electoral history ==
2020 North Dakota House of Representatives election, District 16
Party	Candidate	Votes	%
Republican	Ben Koppelman	5,434	29.28
Republican	Andrew Marschall	4,782	25.77
Democratic–NPL	Tracey L. Wilkie	4,448	23.97
Democratic–NPL	Hamida Dakane	3,869	20.85
Write-in		23	0.12
Total votes		18,556	100.00

2022 North Dakota House of Representatives election, District 10
Party	Candidate	Votes	%
Republican	Steve Swiontek	1,687	40.03
Democratic–NPL	Hamida Dakane	1,343	31.87
Democratic–NPL	Damian Ridl	1,153	27.36
Write-in		31	0.74
Total votes		4,214	100.00

2024 North Dakota House of Representatives election, District 10
Party	Candidate	Votes	%
Republican	Steve Swiontek (incumbent)	3,132	34.31
Republican	Jared Hendrix	3,054	33.45
Democratic–NPL	Hamida Dakane (incumbent)	2,873	31.47
Write-in		70	0.77
Total votes		9,129	100.00
