= Bev Scalze =

American politician (1943–2021)

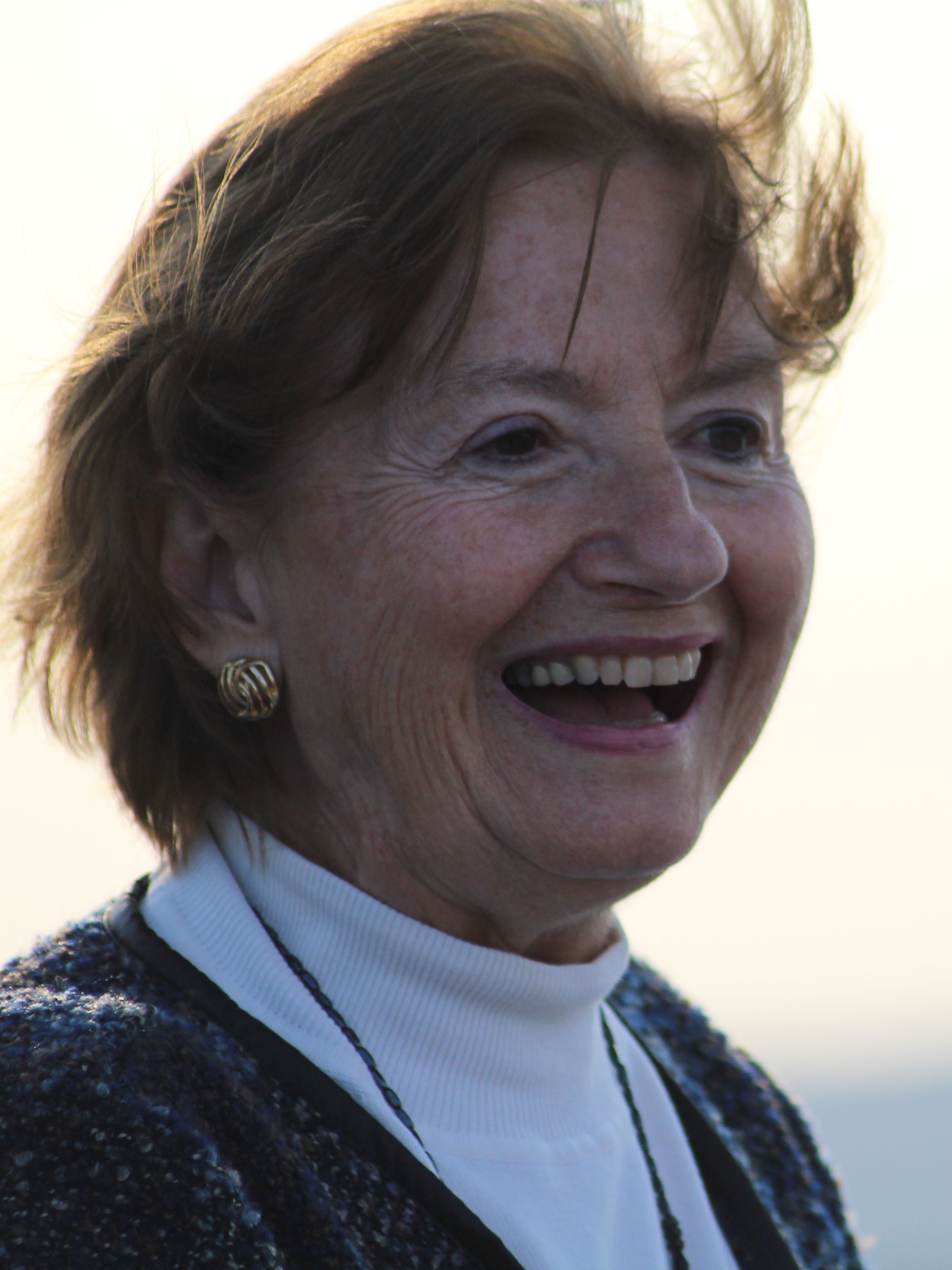
- Scalze in 2014

Member of the Minnesota Senate from the 42nd district
- In office January 8, 2013 – January 3, 2017
- Preceded by: Redrawn district
- Succeeded by: Jason Isaacson

Member of the Minnesota House of Representatives from the 54B district
- In office January 5, 2005 – January 7, 2013
- Preceded by: Carl Jacobson
- Succeeded by: Jason Isaacson (District 42B)

Personal details
- Born: October 27, 1943 Baudette, Minnesota
- Died: June 23, 2021 (aged 77)
- Party: Democratic
- Education: College of Visual Arts; Century College
- Occupation: Small business owner

Beverly M. Scalze (October 27, 1943 – June 23, 2021) was an American politician who served as a member of the Minnesota House of Representatives and the Minnesota Senate. A member of the Minnesota Democratic–Farmer–Labor Party (DFL), she represented District 42 in the Senate, which included portions of Ramsey County in the Twin Cities metropolitan area.

== Early life, education, and career ==
Scalze graduated from Lake of the Woods High School in Baudette. She later attended the College of Visual Arts in Saint Paul and Century College in White Bear Lake, receiving her A.D. and A.A. in art. She was a technician at 3M from 1962 to 1966, and was owner-artist of Scalze's from 1966 to 1996. She was the owner and operator of Hoffman Corner Heating and Air Conditioning in White Bear Lake, beginning in 1996.

Scalze was active in her local community and in state government for many years. From 1979 to 2002, she served as a member of the Little Canada City Council. Scalze was the founder and coordinator of the local Multi-Housing Safety Coalition from 1996 to 2002, a member of the board of trustees of the Suburban Area Chamber of Commerce from 1980 to 1989, president of the Ramsey County League of Local Governments from 1989 to 1990, and vice president of the Little Canada Parent-Teacher Association. She also served as a member of the Ramsey County Riverfront Facilities Ad Hoc Advisory Committee, as a member of the Minnesota Attorney General's Task Force on Pharmaceuticals, Medicare and Family Health and Task Force for Information Technology, and as a delegate to the Rush Line Corridor Task Force.

== Minnesota Legislature ==
Scalze was first elected to the Minnesota House of Representatives in 2004, and was re-elected in 2006, 2008 and 2010. She was a member of the House Ways and Means Committee, and served on the Finance subcommittees for the Capital Investment Finance Division, of which she was vice chair, the Environment and Natural Resources Finance Division, and the Health Care and Human Services Finance Division, and on the State and Local Government Operations Reform, Technology and Elections Subcommittee for the Local Government Division.

In the 2012 Minnesota Senate election, Scalze ran for the seat for District 42 and defeated April King, receiving 55.57% of the vote. Scalze focused on clean water, infrastructure, and local government issues. Scalze served as vice chair of the Senate Capital Investment Committee. She did not seek re-election in 2016.

== Personal life ==
In 1991, Scalze's painting of a brook trout won the Minnesota Department of Natural Resources' annual Trout and Salmon Habitat Stamp Contest.

Scalze died of cancer on June 23, 2021.
