= Jason Isaacson =

American politician (born 1971)

Member of the Minnesota Senate from the 42nd district
- In office January 3, 2017 – January 2, 2023
- Preceded by: Bev Scalze

Member of the Minnesota House of Representatives from the 42B district
- In office January 8, 2013 – January 3, 2017
- Preceded by: Bev Scalze (District 54B)
- Succeeded by: Jamie Becker-Finn

Personal details
- Born: May 20, 1971 (age 55) Moorhead, Minnesota
- Party: Minnesota Democratic–Farmer–Labor Party
- Spouse: Cynthia
- Children: 3
- Education: North Dakota State University (B.S., M.A.); University of Minnesota
- Occupation: Educator

Jason Isaacson (born May 20, 1971) is a Minnesota politician and former member of the Minnesota Senate. A member of the Minnesota Democratic–Farmer–Labor Party (DFL), he was elected to the Minnesota Senate in 2016, after serving in the Minnesota House of Representatives for four years. He represented District 42 in the northern Twin Cities metropolitan area, including Arden Hills, Gem Lake, Little Canada, Mounds View, Shoreview, Vadnais Heights, and parts of Roseville, Spring Lake Park, and Blaine.

== Education and career ==
Isaacson attended North Dakota State University, graduating with a B.S. in political science and later a M.A. in communication studies. He is currently a Ph.D. candidate at the University of Minnesota and an instructor at Century College teaching Interpersonal Communication and Intercultural Communications. Isaacson also teaches at North Hennepin Community College and has taught at Johns Hopkins and George Washington University.

== Minnesota Legislature ==
Isaacson is an advocate for creating living wage jobs, expanding job skills, and affordable housing for all.

Isaacson was first elected to the Minnesota House of Representatives in 2012 and re-elected in 2014. He was elected to the Minnesota Senate in the November 2016 general election and assumed office on January 3, 2017, succeeding retiring state Senator Bev Scalze representing District 42.

92nd Legislative Session (2021-2022), Committees: Education Finance and Policy, Labor and Industry Policy, Mining and Forestry Policy, Ranking Minority Chair for Redistricting.

91st Legislative Session (2019-2020) (second half of Senate term), Committees: Agriculture, Rural Development, and Housing Policy, Higher Education Finance and Policy, Human Services Reform Finance and Policy, Jobs and Economic Growth Finance and Policy.

90th Legislative Session (2017-2018), Committees: Agriculture, Rural Development, and Housing Policy, Higher Education Finance and Policy, Jobs and Economic Growth Finance and Policy.

89th Legislative Session (2015-2016), Committees: Higher Education Policy & Finance, Job Growth & Energy Affordability Policy & Finance, Rules & Legislative Administration.

88th Legislative Session (2013-2014), Committees: Education Policy, Environment and Natural Resources Policy, Housing Finance and Policy, Jobs and Economic Development Finance and Policy. Leadership Position: Assistant Majority Leader.

== Personal life ==
Isaacson is married to his wife, Cynthia, and they reside in Shoreview, Minnesota with their three children.

== Electoral history ==
2012 Minnesota House Election District 42B
Party	Candidate	Votes	%
Democratic (DFL)	Jason "Ike" Isaacson	12,884	57.53%
Republican	Ken Rubenzer	9,462	42.25%

2014 Minnesota House Election District 42B
Party	Candidate	Votes	%
Democratic (DFL)	Jason "Ike" Isaacson	8,814	52.30%
Republican	Heidi Gunderson	8,014	47.55%

2016 Minnesota Senate Election District 42
Party	Candidate	Votes	%
Democratic (DFL)	Jason "Ike" Isaacson	24,962	54.21%
Republican	Candy Sina	21,008	45.62%

2020 Minnesota Senate Election District 42
Party	Candidate	Votes	%
Democratic (DFL)	Jason "Ike" Isaacson	29,647	58.71%
Republican	Ben Schwanke	20,771	41.13%
