= Donald Longmuir =

American politician

Member of North Dakota House of Representatives from the 2nd district
- Incumbent
- Assumed office December 1, 2016
- Preceded by: Bob Skarphol

Personal details
- Party: Republican
- Education: North Dakota State University

Donald W. Longmuir is an American politician.

Longmuir received a Bachelor of Science from North Dakota State University. He served for more than two decades on the Stanley, North Dakota school board and, in 2016, was elected to the North Dakota House of Representatives.

He is a member of the North Dakota Republican Party.
