= Kylie Oversen =

American politician (born 1989)

Chair of the North Dakota Democratic Party
- In office April 13, 2019 – May 8, 2021
- Preceded by: Warren Larson
- Succeeded by: Patrick Hart
- In office March 7, 2015 – June 24, 2018
- Preceded by: Bob Valeu
- Succeeded by: Warren Larson

Member of the North Dakota House of Representatives from the 42nd district
- In office January 8, 2013 – December 5, 2016
- Preceded by: Stacey Dahl
- Succeeded by: Jake Blum

Personal details
- Born: February 3, 1989 (age 37) Killdeer, North Dakota, U.S.
- Party: Democratic
- Education: University of North Dakota (BSW, JD)
- Website: Official website

Kylie Oversen (born February 3, 1989) is an American politician in the Democratic-NPL. She served as a member of the North Dakota House of Representatives, representing the 42nd district from January 2013 to December 2016. The 42nd district is located in the northern portion of Grand Forks and includes the University of North Dakota.

In March 2015, Oversen became the youngest state party chair in the United States when she was elected Chair of the North Dakota Democratic-NPL.

== Early life and education ==
Oversen was born and raised in Killdeer, North Dakota, a city of less than 1,000. Her paternal grandfather, Don Oversen, was a World War II veteran who died in April 2014.

She attended the University of North Dakota, where she was elected Student Body President. In that capacity, she was noted for her extensive work improving the university's student fee allocation process. She was also active in the Christus Rex Lutheran Campus Ministry, calling it her "second home and family." In 2012, she graduated summa cum laude and Phi Beta Kappa with a Bachelor of Social Work and a Bachelor of Social Science.

Following graduation, she began working with the University of North Dakota Alumni Association as a special projects coordinator for the Gorecki Alumni Center. She also interned with PLUS Program, serving families in Grand Forks County. She continued her work at the Christus Rex Lutheran Campus Ministry at UND, and was also a counselor at the American Legion Auxiliary Girls' State Program.

== Political career ==
=== North Dakota House of Representatives ===
Oversen was not considering a career in politics until her senator sent her a Facebook message asking her to run for state representative. She told a magazine, "I had to read it several times." In 2012, she ran in her home 42nd district, and raised $7,275 for her campaign.

In 2012, with 28.7% of the vote, Oversen was elected Democratic-NPL member of the North Dakota House of Representatives, representing the 42nd district since January 2013. The 42nd district is located in the northern portion of Grand Forks and includes the University of North Dakota.

During the 2013 session, Oversen served on the Human Services and Transportation committees. She subsequently served on the Human Services and Political Subdivisions committees.

=== North Dakota Democratic-NPL Party ===
In March 2015, she was elected the Chair of the North Dakota Democratic-Nonpartisan League Party, the state's branch of the national Democratic Party, at age 26, making her the youngest state party chair in the United States. In June 2018, she stepped down from that position to run for North Dakota Tax Commissioner in the November 2018 election. In April 2019, she successfully returned to the Chair position.

== Other work ==
Oversen is a member of Greater Grand Forks Young Professionals and serves on the board of directors for the Red River Valley Habitat for Humanity as well as for the Area Health Education Centers, which are affiliated with the University of North Dakota Center for Rural Health.

== Views ==
=== Cost of higher education ===
Oversen has been a public advocate for lowering college and university tuition and fees at public institutions. She introduced a bill in the ND House of Representatives to freeze tuition at all of North Dakota's public institutions of higher education, but it was defeated in February 2015.

=== Same-sex marriage ===
Oversen supports same-sex marriage.

== Electoral history ==
=== North Dakota Tax Commissioner Election, 2018 ===
Party	Candidates	%	Votes
Republican	Ryan Rauschenberger	58.6	183,283
Democratic-NPL	Kylie Oversen	41.2	128,806
Write-In		0.2	684
Total votes			312,773

=== North Dakota House of Representatives Elections, 2016 ===
Party	Candidates	%	Votes
Republican	Jake Blum	27.2	2,029
Republican	Emily O'Brien	26.1	1,948
Democratic-NPL	Kylie Oversen	24.2	1,808
Democratic-NPL	Grant Hauschild	22.4	1,673
Total votes			7,466

=== North Dakota House of Representatives Elections, 2012 ===
Party	Candidates	%	Votes
Democratic-NPL	Kylie Oversen	28.7	2,524
Democratic-NPL	Corey Mock	28.3	2,481
Republican	John Mitzel	21.9	1,925
Republican	Mike Peterson	21.1	1,852
Total votes			8,782

== Personal life ==
Oversen resides in Grand Forks, North Dakota.

=== Religion ===
Oversen is a member of the Evangelical Lutheran Church in America. When asked by The Lutheran, a monthly magazine and primary publication of the ELCA, "What's your calling?" she replied:

Broadly, public service. Once I got into the legislature, I found new ways I was able to express my faith in the area of social justice. I was proud to be an ELCA Lutheran in a discussion about discrimination based on sexual orientation ... to say 'some of us are called to social justice and equality as part of our faith, not against our faith.'

== Awards and honors ==
Year	Award/honor	Awarded by	Rationale
2014	North Dakota Woman of the Year	North Dakota Women's Network	For her work for women and families in North Dakota during her time in the Legislature

Party political offices
Preceded by Bob Valeu	Chair of the North Dakota Democratic Party; 2015–2018	Succeeded by Warren Larson
Preceded by Jason Astrup	Democratic nominee for Tax Commissioner of North Dakota; 2018	Most recent
Preceded by Warren Larson	Chair of the North Dakota Democratic Party; 2019–2021	Succeeded by Patrick Hart
