= Cindy Schreiber-Beck =

American politician (1954–2025)

Cynthia Schreiber-Beck

Member of the North Dakota House of Representatives from the 25th district
- In office December 1, 2014 – May 18, 2025
- Preceded by: John Wall
- Succeeded by: Kathy Skroch

Personal details
- Born: December 13, 1954 Foxhome, Minnesota, U.S.
- Died: May 18, 2025 (aged 70)
- Party: Republican

Cynthia Schreiber-Beck (December 13, 1954 – May 18, 2025) was an American politician who served in the North Dakota House of Representatives from the 25th district from 2014 until her death in May 2025. Schreiber-Beck died on May 18, 2025, at the age of 70.
