= Roger Maki =

American politician

Member of the North Dakota House of Representatives from the 26th district
- Incumbent
- Assumed office December 1, 2024 Serving with Kelby Timmons
- Preceded by: Kelby Timmons

Personal details
- Party: Republican

Roger A. Maki is an American politician serving as a member of the North Dakota House of Representatives from the 42nd district. A Republican, he was elected in the 2024 North Dakota House of Representatives election.
