= Jared Hendrix =

American politician

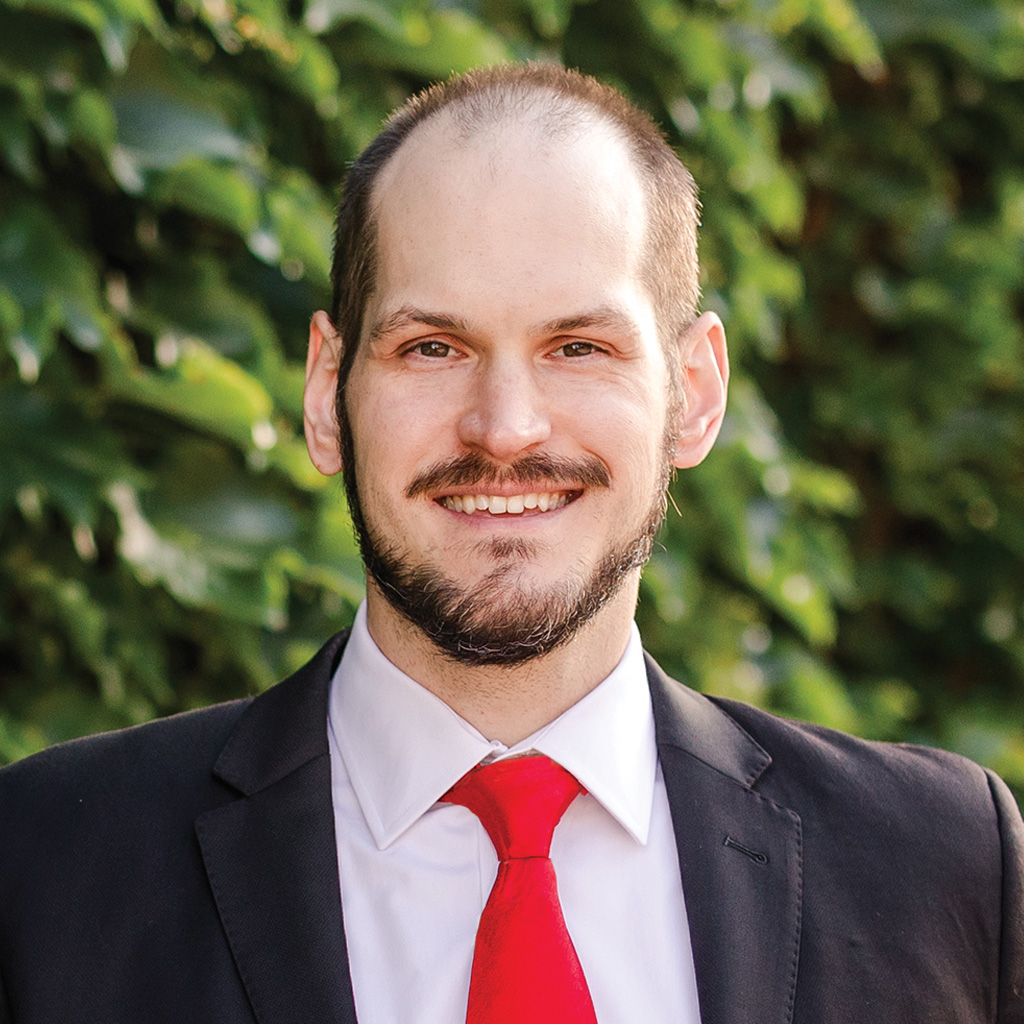

Member of the North Dakota House of Representatives from the 10th district
- Incumbent
- Assumed office December 1, 2024
- Preceded by: Hamida Dakane

Personal details
- Born: Newport News, Virginia
- Party: Republican
- Education: Thomas Nelson Community College (AA)
- Website: hendrixfornorthdakota.com

Jared Hendrix is an American activist and politician serving as a member of the North Dakota House of Representatives from the 10th district. A Republican, he was elected in the 2024 North Dakota House of Representatives election. In 2022, Hendrix successfully led a statewide ballot initiative that applied term limits on the governor of North Dakota and the state legislature.

== Early life and career ==
Hendrix's father is a Naval veteran and career law enforcement officer and his mother is a homemaker. Hendrix graduated from Thomas Nelson Community College in Virginia with an Associate Degree in Computer Arts. According to a campaign news release, his “professional background includes retail, warehousing, construction, and a few years of manual labor in the North Dakota oil fields.”

Hendrix has worked on political campaigns, including state legislative campaigns, former Congressman Ron Paul’s 2012 presidential campaign and then-Congressman Kevin Cramer’s successful 2018 campaign for one of North Dakota’s US Senate seats.

== Activism ==
Hendrix helped create legislation which established North Dakota's modern cottage foods industry, which many reports indicate has provided economic opportunity for rural and urban food producers to sell homemade products safely.

In August 2022, Hendrix was revealed to be a member of a Telegram group called the North Dakota Young Republicans which "frequently featured bigoted slurs and white supremacist tropes" in its messages between members, including personal attacks against gay public figures and anti-Semitic conspiracy theories.

In the wake of the assassination of conservative activist Charlie Kirk, Hendrix organized a memorial event titled ‘Faith Over Fear’ on September 14, 2025, which featured Senator John Hoeven and Congresswoman Julie Fedorchak.

=== Ballot measures ===
In 2022, Hendrix led an initiated measure to amend the North Dakota state constitution to apply term limits on the governor and state legislature. In an op-ed in the Minot Daily News, Hendrix argued, "In this era of political division and polarization, term limits are an issue that brings Americans together... Since 8-year term limits are good enough for the leader of the free world, they ought to be good enough for state leaders too." Some signatures gathered for the measure were initially rejected by North Dakota Secretary of State Al Jaeger, who was serving in his 30th year in elected office at the time. Hendrix filed suit to defend the measure. The case was eventually decided by the state Supreme Court, which unanimously concluded that "the Secretary of State misapplied the law" and ordered Jaeger to place the measure on the ballot. The measure was approved by 63.43% of voters.

In 2024, Hendrix led another ballot effort to apply an age limit of 80 years for members of North Dakota's congressional delegation, claiming that "[m]ost people think it’s common sense that politicians should retire at some point." In an op-ed in the Bismarck Tribune, Hendrix wrote, "It’s easy for well-funded incumbents to stay in power without congressional term limits... [and] we allow career politicians to stay until they croak. They should go home, be with their grandchildren, and live under the laws they’ve passed." The measure was approved by voters with over 60% of the vote.

During the 68th legislative session, legislation was introduced to alter the term limits just passed the previous November election by voters. Hendrix testified against the bill, calling it "unconstitutional" and saying a potential lawsuit defending it would be a "frivolous expenditure of state funds."

== North Dakota House of Representatives ==
On April 4, 2024, Hendrix announced he would be seeking one of the two State House seats in District 10 as a Republican, facing both incumbents running for reelection in the same district. His candidacy was endorsed by former presidential candidate Ron Paul and US Senator Kevin Cramer. Hendrix won one of the two available seats in the election. He placed second out of three candidates, beating Democratic-NPL incumbent Hamida Dakane, despite Kamala Harris narrowly defeating Donald Trump in the same district.

During the 69th North Dakota Legislative assembly, Hendrix was the prime sponsor of 14 bills or resolutions. He introduced legislation to reinforce federal healthcare price transparency rules, which was opposed by the North Dakota Hospital Association. The bill passed the House 89-1 but was narrowly defeated in the Senate by 1 vote. Hendrix's other bills included legislation to require age verification for viewing adult content online.

Hendrix opposed legislative efforts to alter the legislative term limits passed by voters, which is specifically prohibited in the North Dakota State Constitution. He criticized the effort, saying, "You have plain language in the constitution restricting what the Legislature can do...”

== Political positions ==
Hendrix has been active in supporting law enforcement, defending the Second Amendment and advocating for stricter limitations on executive power. He has advocated many reforms in the Republican Party, including better transparency and communication regarding legislator's voting records, as well as criticizing party leadership for appointing district chairs and not allowing grassroots party members to hold elections.

== Electoral history ==
2024 North Dakota House of Representatives election, District 10
Party	Candidate	Votes	%
Republican	Steve Swiontek (incumbent)	3,132	34.31
Republican	Jared Hendrix	3,054	33.45
Democratic–NPL	Hamida Dakane (incumbent)	2,873	31.47
Write-in		70	0.77
Total votes		9,129	100.00
