= Pat Heinert =

American politician

Member of the North Dakota House of Representatives from the 32nd district
- Incumbent
- Assumed office December 1, 2016 Serving with Lisa Meier

Personal details
- Party: Republican
- Spouse: Lynn Heinert
- Children: 2
- Education: University of Mary

Patrick D. "Pat" Heinert is an American politician. He is a Republican representing District 32 in the North Dakota House of Representatives since 2016.

== Personal life ==
Heinert holds Bachelor of Arts and Master of Arts degrees in Management from the University of Mary.

Heinert was Sheriff in Burleigh County, North Dakota for 12 years.

== Political career ==
In 2016, Heinert ran for election to one of two District 32 seats in the North Dakota House of Representatives. Heinert and Republican incumbent Lisa Meier won (former representative Mark Dosch was not running for another term). Heinert is running for re-election in 2020.

As of June 2020, Heinert sits on the following committees:

- Education Policy Interim Committee
- Judiciary Interim Committee
- Education Standing Committee
- Energy and Natural Resources Standing Committee
- Ethics Standing Committee
