= Red River Women's Clinic =

Red River Women's Clinic is an abortion clinic based in Moorhead, Minnesota. Before the 2022 Dobbs v. Jackson Women's Health Organization decision, the clinic was located three miles away in Fargo, North Dakota. From 1998 until its 2022 relocation, it was the only clinic providing abortions within North Dakota, with its departure leaving the state completely without abortion providers. The clinic provides surgical termination until the end of the 16th week of pregnancy, though this limit is a logistical one, not due to any legislative gestational limit.

== Background ==
Red River Women's Clinic

Geography
- Location: 302 US-75, Moorhead, Minnesota, United States

History
- Founded: 1998

Links
- Website: www.redriverwomensclinic.com
- Lists: Hospitals in Minnesota

Red River Women's Clinic is an abortion clinic that was originally located in Fargo, North Dakota and for many years was the only one in the state. Not only does the clinic provide abortions, but like almost every abortion health center, it also issues birth control, emergency contraception, pregnancy tests, and STI tests. Before the clinic opened, there were two doctors providing abortions in North Dakota, one in Grand Forks and one in Jamestown. As the doctors were nearing the end of their careers, they asked Jane Bovard to open a clinic in Fargo. It began operating in 1998. The clinic's director is Tammi Kromenaker.

In 2013, the Center for Reproductive Rights sued on behalf of the clinic over a law requiring doctors performing abortions to have admitting privileges to local hospitals. Once this law, SB 2305, was signed, the clinic physicians began attempting to comply with the law. Hospitals within 30 miles of the facility, however, already informed the clinic that its doctors would not be allowed access for reasons such as hospital policy regarding abortion services and the annual minimum number of patients that physicians must accept. Supported by the Center of Reproductive Rights, it sued the state on account of the law being an unnecessary barrier between doctors and performing an abortion.

== Awards ==
In 2015, the clinic received a "Standard of Excellence" award from the National Abortion Federation for its work in a challenging environment.

== Relocation ==
In the wake of the Supreme Court's holding in Dobbs v. Jackson Women's Health Organization that the US Constitution does not confer a right to abortion and the recent illegal status of abortion in North Dakota, the clinic moved to Moorhead, Minnesota, approximately three miles away and just on the other side of the state line. In anticipation of their move, Red River Women's clinic raised more than $550,000 in two days on GoFundMe. Before the clinic moved, they also filed another lawsuit in 2022 based on the trigger law that was passed in 2007. This law would ban nearly all abortions in the state. In the lawsuit, Red River Women's Clinic argued the law goes against the state constitution. The lawsuit claimed that the clinic's patients' rights would be violated by the trigger ban because carrying a pregnancy to term has far greater health risks for women than having an abortion. A trial court determined in September 2024 that North Dakota's complete abortion ban violates pregnant women's fundamental right to seek abortion treatment and is unlawful due to vagueness. North Dakota tried to implement its trigger ban after the U.S. Supreme Court overturned Roe v. Wade. This attempt was blocked by an injunction until the state repealed and replaced it with the present entire ban. After the clinic moved locations, North Dakota was left with no abortion clinics.
