= SuAnn Olson =

American politician

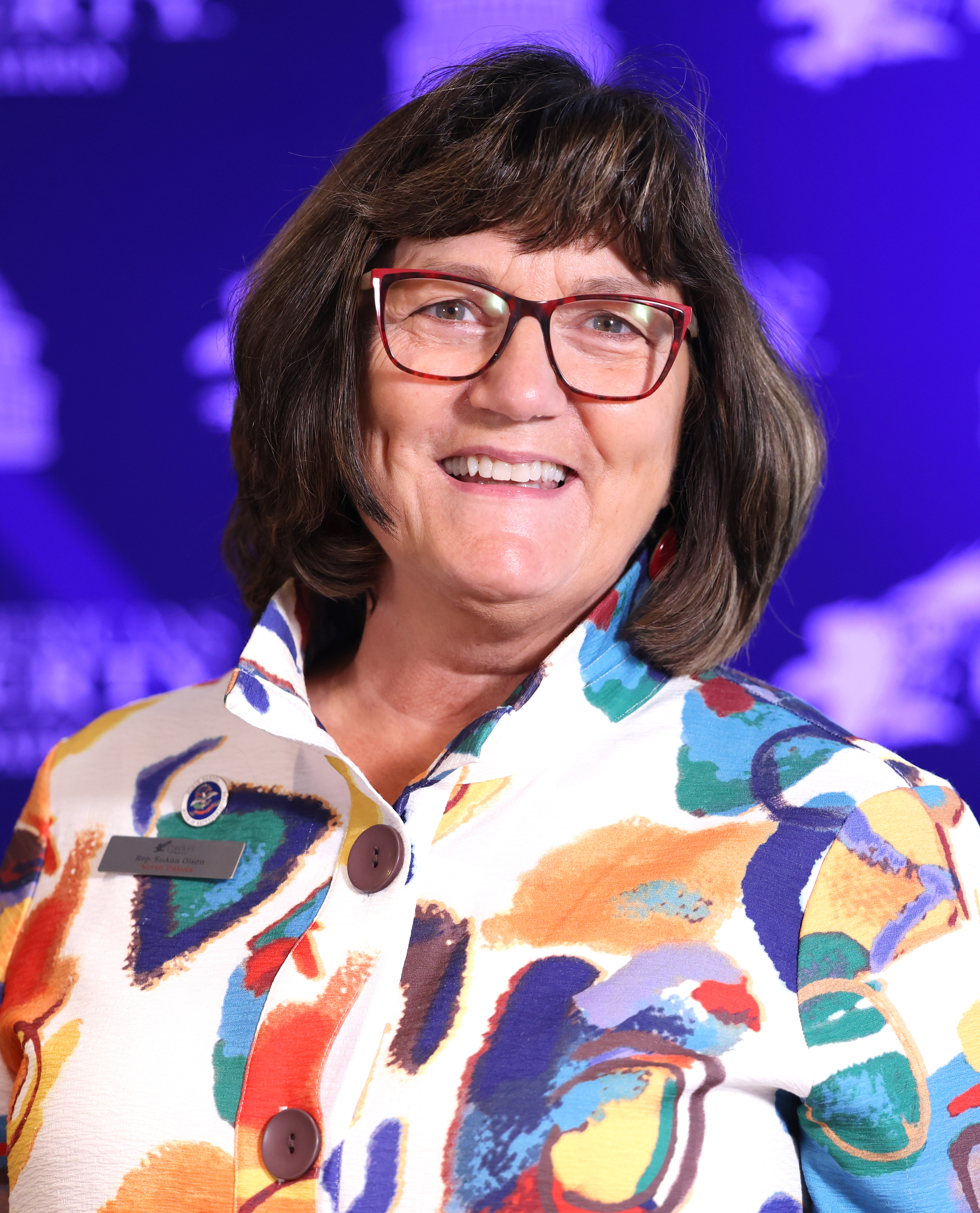
- Olson at the 2024 Hazlitt Summit hosted by Young Americans for Liberty Foundation

Member of the North Dakota House of Representatives from the 8th district
- Incumbent
- Assumed office December 1, 2022 Serving with Mike Berg
- Preceded by: Jeff Delzer

Personal details
- Party: Republican

SuAnn Olson is an American politician. She has served as a member of the North Dakota House of Representatives from the 8th district. She is a member of the Republican Party.

Olson has introduced numerous bills targeting LGBTQ people as part of the larger 2020s anti-LGBTQ movement. She introduced three in 2023, all of which passed: HB 1473 (a bathroom bill), HB 1474 (restricting definitions of sex), and HCR 3010 (a resolution to protect cisgender women).

In 2025, Olson introduced HB 1181, which sought to require state-funded entities to refer to people by their sex as assigned at birth.
