= Donald Dietrich =

American politician

Member of the North Dakota House of Representatives from the 42nd district
- In office December 1, 2004 – December 1, 2008
- Preceded by: Mike Grosz; Amy Warnke
- Succeeded by: Corey Mock

Personal details
- Born: September 16, 1944 Drayton, North Dakota
- Died: December 11, 2016 (aged 72) Grand Forks, North Dakota
- Party: Republican

Donald Dietrich (September 16, 1944 – December 11, 2016) was an American politician who served in the North Dakota House of Representatives from the 42nd district from 2004 to 2008.

He died of a heart attack on December 11, 2016, in Grand Forks, North Dakota at age 72.
