= North Dakota HB 1572 =

North Dakota State Legislature
- Full name: Personhood of Children Act
- Introduced: 2009
- Senate voted: April 3, 2009 (16–29)
- Sponsor: Rep. Dan Ruby
- Bill: HB 1572
- Website: https://www.legis.nd.gov/assembly/61-2009/bill-index/bi1572.html

Status: Not passed

North Dakota House Bill 1572, also known as the Personhood of Children Act, was a bill introduced in 2009 by Representative Dan Ruby in the North Dakota Legislature. The bill aimed to define “individual,” “person,” or “human being” to include “any organism with the genome of Homo sapiens,” effectively granting legal personhood to human embryos and fetuses at all stages of development.

== Legislative history ==
On February 17, 2009, the North Dakota House of Representatives passed HB 1572 with a vote of 51–41. The bill then proceeded to the Senate, where it was defeated on April 3, 2009, by a vote of 29–16.

== Provisions ==
The bill sought to amend the North Dakota Century Code by:

- Defining “individual,” “person,” or “human being” to include any organism with the genome of Homo sapiens.
- Creating new sections related to the crimes of dismemberment and torture.
- Amending existing sections to adjust penalties for crimes against born-alive children.

== Support and opposition ==
Proponents argued that the bill would establish legal recognition of human life from conception, potentially challenging the precedent set by Roe v. Wade. However, North Dakota's Roman Catholic bishops expressed concerns, suggesting amendments to clarify the bill's intent and prevent unintended legal consequences.

Opponents contended that the bill could lead to a total ban on abortion and complicate access to certain contraceptives, raising concerns about women's reproductive rights.
