= Doug Osowski (politician) =

American politician

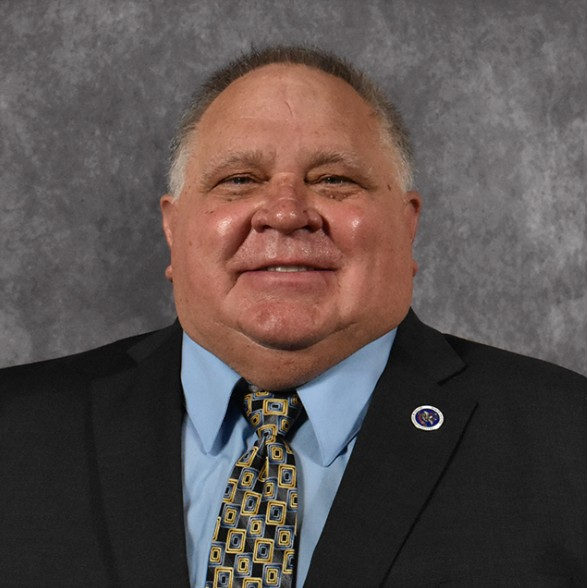

Member of the North Dakota House of Representatives from the 42nd district
- Incumbent
- Assumed office December 1, 2024 Serving with Emily O'Brien (2024-2025)
- Preceded by: Claire Cory

Personal details
- Party: Republican
- Education: University of North Dakota

Doug Osowski is an American politician serving as a member of the North Dakota House of Representatives from the 42nd district. A Republican, he was elected in the 2024 North Dakota House of Representatives election alongside Emily O'Brien. Osowski is a senior system administrator for the North Dakota University System.
