= Kenton Onstad =

American politician

Minority Leader of the North Dakota House of Representatives
- In office 2013–2016
- Preceded by: Jerry Kelsh
- Succeeded by: Corey Mock

Member of the North Dakota House of Representatives from the 4th district
- In office 2001–2016 Serving with Glen Froseth
- Preceded by: Ronald Nichols
- Succeeded by: Bill Oliver (American politician); Terry B. Jones

Personal details
- Born: July 17, 1953 (age 73) Minot, North Dakota
- Party: Democratic-NPL
- Spouse: Kathy
- Education: Dickinson State University (BA)
- Profession: Farmer

Kenton B. Onstad (born July 17, 1953) is the former Democratic-NPL Minority Leader in the North Dakota House of Representatives and was one of the two members who represents District 4, which is composed of Mountrail County, the Fort Berthold Indian Reservation, portions of Mercer County and a northern portion of Dunn County.

Onstad served as Minority Leader from 2001 until his electoral defeat in 2016. Prior to that, he has been Assistant Minority Leader as well as alderman for Parshall City Council and officer for Booner Township. He is the owner/manager of a farm and also employed by Mountrail-Williams Electric Cooperative. Onstad's professional experience includes President of Parshall 2000 Incorporated; teaching in the Parshall School District from 1975 to 1983; being an owner/manager in farming since 1983; and working for Mountrail-Williams Electric Cooperative since 1998. He earned his BS in mathematics from Dickinson State University in 1975. Onstad and his wife, Kathy, have three children; Sarah, Jaclyn, Andrew.
