= 2022 North Dakota Constitutional Measure 1 =

Constitutional Measure 1
- November 8, 2022
- Term Limits for Governor and State Legislators Initiative

Results
Choice	Votes	%
Yes	150,363	63.43%
No	86,674	36.57%
Valid votes	237,037	100.00%
Invalid or blank votes	0	0.00%
Total votes	237,037	100.00%
Registered voters/turnout	564,935	41.96%
- County results Yes 70–80% 60–70% 50–60%

North Dakota Constitutional Measure 1 of 2022 is an amendment to the Constitution of North Dakota that set term limits for the governors and the state legislators, to 2 4-year terms and 8 years, respectively. The measure applied limits only to the officials elected after 2023. It was approved by 63.43% of the voters.

== Results ==
Constitutional Measure 1 was approved easily with 63.4% of the vote. It performed well across the state but earned its best results in Williams, Sioux and Ransom counties. Conversely, it showed its worst performance in Burleigh County, where the state's capital Bismarck is located.

Constitutional Measure 1
Choice	Votes	%
For	150,363	63.43
Against	86,674	36.57
Total	237,037	100.00

== See also ==
- 2024 North Dakota Measure 1
