= Sebastian Ertelt =

American politician

Member of the North Dakota House of Representatives from the 26th district
- In office December 1, 2016 – December 1, 2022
- Preceded by: Bill Amerman, Jerry Kelsh

Personal details
- Party: Republican
- Website: Official Election Campaign Page

Sebastian Ertelt is an American politician.

Ertelt received a Bachelor of Science in mechanical engineering from North Dakota State University and an MBA from the University of Mary. In 2016 he was elected to represent the 26th district in the North Dakota House of Representatives with Representative Kathy Skroch. They defeated the Democratic incumbents Bill Amerman and Jerry Kelsh in the 2016 election after having previously lost to them in 2012.

He is a member of the North Dakota Republican Party.
