= Stacey Dahl =

American politician

Member of the North Dakota House of Representatives from the 42nd district
- In office December 1, 2004 – December 1, 2012
- Succeeded by: Kylie Oversen

Personal details
- Born: October 7, 1981 (age 44) Bismarck, North Dakota
- Party: Republican

Stacey Dahl (born October 7, 1981) is an American politician who served in the North Dakota House of Representatives from the 42nd district from 2004 to 2012.
