= Christina Wolff =

American politician

Member of the North Dakota House of Representatives from the 38th district
- Incumbent
- Assumed office December 1, 2024
- Preceded by: JoAnne Rademacher

Personal details
- Party: Republican

Christina Wolff is an American politician serving as a member of the North Dakota House of Representatives from the 38th district. A Republican, she was elected in the 2024 North Dakota House of Representatives election. Wolff moved from Alaska to Minot in 2010.
