= Nels Christianson =

American politician

Member of the North Dakota House of Representatives from the 18th district
- Incumbent
- Assumed office December 1, 2024
- Preceded by: Corey Mock

Personal details
- Party: Republican
- Education: University of Southern California
- Website: nelschristianson.net

Nels Christianson is an American politician serving as a member of the North Dakota House of Representatives from the 18th district. A Republican, he was elected in the 2024 North Dakota House of Representatives election. He received a BS in business administration from the University of Southern California.
