= 2024 North Dakota Measure 1 =

- June 11, 2024
- Congressional Age Limits Initiative

Results
Choice	Votes	%
Yes	68,468	60.84%
No	44,076	39.16%
Total votes	112,544	100.00%
Registered voters/turnout	594,140	18.94%
- County results Yes: 50–60% 60–70%
- Source: Statement of Vote at the Wayback Machine (archived February 10, 2025)

North Dakota Measure 1 was a 2024 North Dakota ballot initiative which, if allowed to be enforced, would prohibit the election or appointment of any individual who would turn 81 years old by December 31 of that year.

== Background ==
The initiative was passed in a landslide, but is currently blocked from enforcement by the U.S. Supreme Court's ruling in U.S. Term Limits, Inc. v. Thornton (1995).

The initiative requires that, "in the case of a court ruling blocking the enforcement of the age limit, any candidate who would be restricted from serving due to the age limit, would be barred from appearing on the ballot to be nominated or elected to serve in the House or Senate. If a court ruling requires such a candidate to appear on the ballot, the initiative would require a note on ballots next to the candidate's name stating the candidate's age at the end of their term." The initiative would require the North Dakota Attorney General to defend all portions of the law in state and federal court.

== Text ==
This initiated measure creates a new article in the North Dakota Constitution entitled “Congressional Age Limits.” Under this Article, no person may be elected or appointed to serve a term or a portion of a term representing North Dakota in the U.S. Senate or the U.S. House of Representatives if that person could be 81 years old by December 31 of the year immediately preceding the end of the term, and any such person is prohibited from appearing on the ballot. If a superior law requires age-limited candidates to appear on the ballot in a primary or general election, the candidates’ age on December 31 of the year immediately preceding the end of the term they are seeking must be printed next to the names of all candidates for all federal legislative offices in future elections. This Article gives standing to enforce the article to any elector; permits an eligible person to file to appear on the primary election ballot or use an alternate statutory nomination method for a federal legislative office for the 2026 election immediately after this law takes effect; and provides immediate standing in the courts of this state to challenge the limited question of whether a denial violates article 1 of the U.S. Constitution. The Article also requires the Attorney General to zealously defend Section 4 of the Article and permits any elector residing within the district of an applicable office to timely join in the defense of Section 4 as a real party in interest. The Article’s provisions are severable, and, if any provision is held to be invalid, the remaining provisions and their application must not be affected. If this Article conflicts with any other provision of the North Dakota Constitution, the provisions of this Article must control. The Article will take effect immediately upon passage at the 2024 primary election or 2024 general election.

== Endorsements ==
Yes

State legislators

- Jared Hendrix, term limits activist and state representative from the 10th district (2024–present) (Republican) (Note: Hendrix was first elected to the North Dakota House of Representatives in 2024, but was previously a well-known advocate for term limits in the state)

Organizations

- U.S. Term Limits

== Results ==
2024 North Dakota Measure 1
Choice	Votes	%
For	68,468	60.84
Against	44,076	39.16
Total	112,544	100.00
Source: Ballotpedia

== See also ==
- 2022 North Dakota Constitutional Measure 1
