= Claire Cory =

American politician (born 1998)

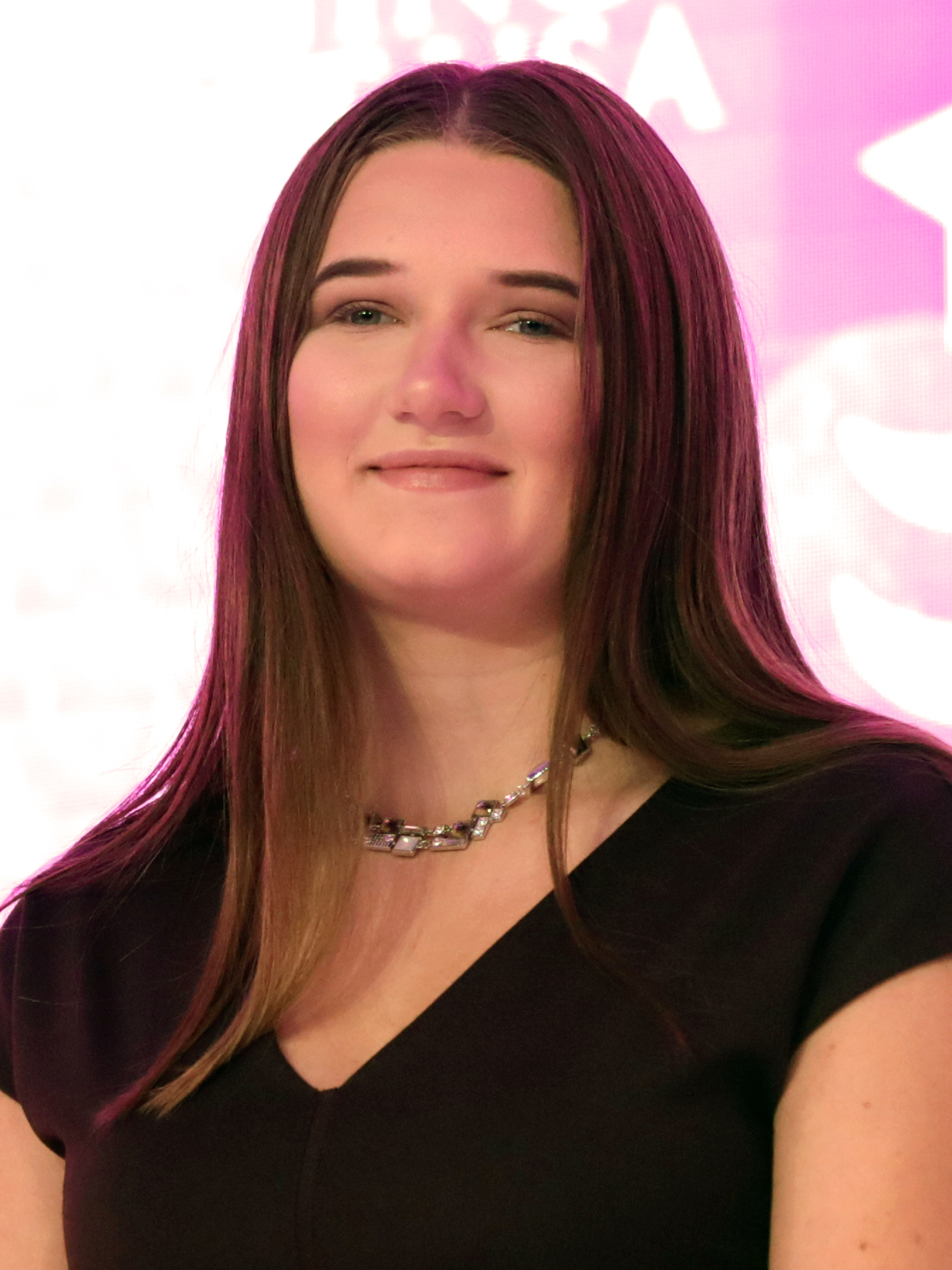
- Cory at a Turning Point USA event in 2021

Member of the North Dakota Senate from the 42nd district
- Incumbent
- Assumed office December 1, 2024
- Preceded by: Curt Kreun

Member of the North Dakota House of Representatives from the 42rd district
- In office October 11, 2019 – December 1, 2024 Serving with Emily O'Brien
- Preceded by: Jake Blum
- Succeeded by: Doug Osowski

Personal details
- Born: September 11, 1998 (age 27) Grand Forks, North Dakota, U.S.
- Party: Republican
- Education: University of North Dakota (BS)

Claire Cory (born September 11, 1998) is an American politician serving as a member of the North Dakota Senate from the 42nd district. She assumed office on December 2, 2024, succeeding Curt Kreun. Cory previously served as a member of the North Dakota House of Representatives for District 42 from 2019 to 2024.

== Early life and education ==
Cory was born on September 11, 1998, in Grand Forks, North Dakota. She graduated from Grand Forks Central High School, and earned a Bachelor of Science degree in public administration and political science from the University of North Dakota.

== Career ==
In 2018, Cory worked as an intern for the North Dakota Republican Party and United States Senate. She also volunteered on Kevin Cramer's re-election campaign. She was also an election worker for Grand Forks County, North Dakota. Cory was selected to succeed Jake Blum in the North Dakota House of Representatives in October 2019. Cory assumed her office on October 11, 2019, and was subsequently elected in November 2020. She is the youngest female ever elected to the legislature in the state of North Dakota.

In August 2021, Cory created a Change.org petition demanding that the University of North Dakota remove its policy on face masks amidst the COVID-19 pandemic.

In August 2022, Cory was revealed to be a member of a Telegram group called the North Dakota Young Republicans which "frequently featured bigoted slurs and white supremacist tropes" in its messages between members, including personal attacks against gay public figures, such as House member Joshua Boschee, as well as anti-Semitic conspiracy theories. Despite claiming she had the group muted and did not read the messages, she was shown to have posted messages in the group. "The statements in question do not represent my values or those of my district," said Cory. "Representative Boschee is a legislator who serves his district admirably, and while I disagree with him politically, his sexuality should not be used as a personal attack."

On February 26, 2024, Cory announced a campaign for the District 42 North Dakota Senate seat being vacated by Curt Kreun. Cory would go on to win the primary and secure the Republican nomination for the seat in June, before winning the seat over Democratic challenger Rodney Gigstad in November.

== Legal issues ==
Cory was arrested and charged with driving under the influence (DUI) on May 7, 2024, with a reported blood alcohol content of 0.186%. She initially pled not guilty, but later plead guilty to an amended charge of reckless driving on July 2, 2024. Despite her BAC being over twice the legal limit in North Dakota, she was not charged with aggravated DUI – which comes with a mandatory jail sentence under state law – since she was charged at the municipal level. Cory was fined $901 and given a suspended sentence of 12 days in jail.

In the body cam footage of her arrest, the police officer said: "North Dakota and North Dakotans don't really put that much of a stigma on DUIs," to which Cory replied: "Yeah, but I'm an elected official".
