= Mike Nathe =

American politician (born 1963)

Member of the North Dakota House of Representatives from the 30th district
- Incumbent
- Assumed office 2008

Personal details
- Born: September 19, 1963 (age 62) Montevideo, Minnesota, U.S.
- Party: Republican
- Spouse: Karen
- Children: 3
- Education: University of Minnesota (BS)
- Profession: funeral director

Michael Nathe (born September 19, 1963) is an American politician. He is a member of the North Dakota House of Representatives from the 30th District, serving since 2008. He is a member of the Republican party.
