= Glenn Bosch =

American politician

Member of the North Dakota House of Representatives from the 30th district
- Incumbent
- Assumed office December 1, 2016
- Preceded by: Diane Larson

Personal details
- Party: Republican
- Spouse: Julie
- Children: 2
- Education: Bismarck State College (AS)

Glenn Bosch is an American politician. He is a Republican representing District 30 in the North Dakota House of Representatives.

== Political career ==
Bosch was first elected to represent District 30 in the North Dakota House of Representatives in 2016, and is running for re-election in 2020.

Bosch sits on the following committees:

- Energy and Natural Resources
- Industry, Business and Labor
- Information Technology Interim Committee
- Statewide Interoperability Executive Committee

== Personal life ==
Bosch is a lifelong resident of Bismarck, North Dakota. He holds an AS from Bismarck State College, and worked for Bismarck-based AVI Systems for over 30 years. He is also a co-owner of the Bismarck Larks baseball club.
