= Jake Blum =

North Dakota politician from Grand Forks

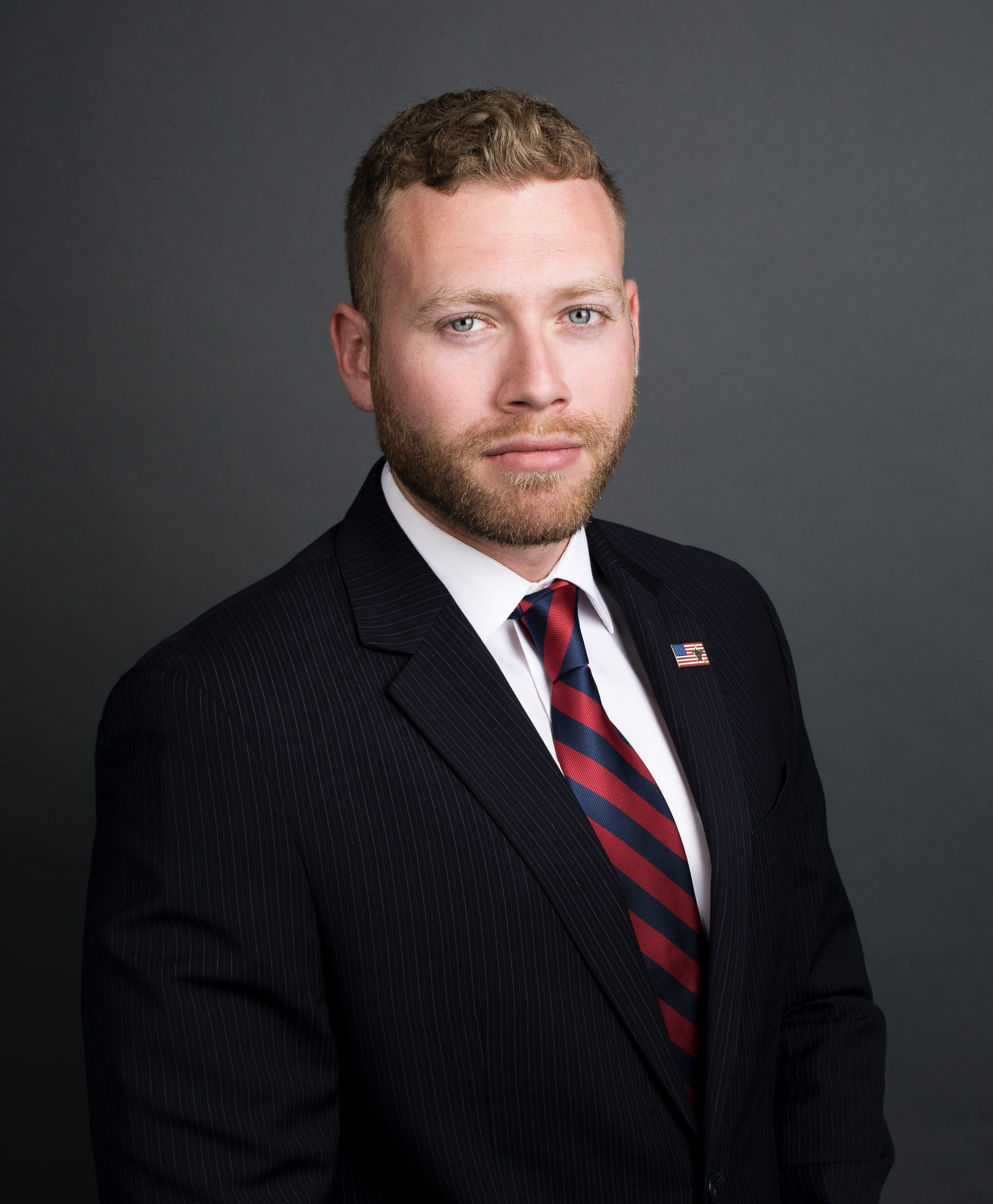

Member of the North Dakota House of Representatives from the 42nd district
- In office December 1, 2016 – October 4, 2019
- Preceded by: Kylie Oversen
- Succeeded by: Claire Cory

Personal details
- Born: Jake Graeme Blum; May 11, 1994 (age 32) Wausau, Wisconsin, U.S.
- Party: Republican
- Spouse: Victoria Blum (née Yapel)
- Education: University of North Dakota (BS)

Jake Blum is an American politician who served as a member of the North Dakota House of Representatives for the 42nd district from 2016 to 2019.

== Early life and education ==
Blum was born in Wausau, Wisconsin and raised in Wayzata, Minnesota. He earned a Bachelor of Science degree in political science and criminal justice from the University of North Dakota.

== Career ==
Blum is a public relations & business consultant, and registered lobbyist. Blum formerly served as a campaign strategist for Senator Kevin Cramer and was a previous employee of the Congressional Leadership Fund aside from his position in the legislature.

Blum also was previously employed as a staffer on the Donald Trump 2020 presidential campaign, and formerly served as State Director of Students for Trump during his time as a student at the University of North Dakota. Blum was previously the youngest elected official in the state of North Dakota.

In March 2018, Blum was formally invited by President Donald Trump to a White House Summit for millennial and Generation Z political leaders and social media personalities, discussing their efforts to highlight the White House's policy proposals.

In October 2019, Blum announced his resignation from the House and that he would be relocating to Minnesota. Following his resignation from the legislature, Blum joined Synergetic Endeavors, a St. Paul-based public affairs and consulting firm, as a communications and business development strategist.

In February 2023, Blum was named National Political Director and Public Relations Manager for Primacy Strategy Group (PSG), a government relations and public affairs firm based in St. Paul, Minnesota. In this role, he has directed government relations and advocacy engagements across Minnesota, North Dakota, South Dakota, Montana, Wisconsin, and Michigan, and has overseen the formation and administration of several political action committees on behalf of the firm and its clients.

== Politics ==
Elections for the North Dakota House of Representatives took place in 2016. The primary election took place on June 14, 2016, in which Blum was unopposed, and the general election was held on November 8, 2016.

Jake Blum defeated Grant Hauschild and incumbent Kylie Oversen in the North Dakota House of Representatives District 42 general election, and was distinguished as the top vote-getter in the 4-way race.

Focusing on workforce development throughout his tenure, Blum was a cosponsor of House Bill 1171 which created a skilled workforce student loan repayment program and a skilled workforce scholarship program. Blum introduced the legislation in the House Education Committee, and the bill was passed by both legislative chambers and signed into law by Governor Doug Burgum on April 26, 2019.

In April 2019, Blum successfully passed a House Concurrent Resolution through both legislative chambers, calling on the White House and Congressional Leadership to immediately proceed with construction of a Mexico–United States border wall. The resolution was co-sponsored by the House and Senate Majority leadership, and passed with super-majority support.

== Personal life ==
Blum is a resident of the Twin Cities metropolitan area, along with his wife Victoria (married 2023). Blum is a practicing Roman Catholic.

Blum is a descendant of John Lathrop Jerome, his third great-grandfather, who was a prominent attorney and businessman that relocated from New York to Colorado, where he built his career in the 1880s. Jerome served as Governor of the General Society of Colonial Wars, was a member of the Sons of the American Revolution and was a Trustee of Hamilton College. He was also a first cousin of Jennie Jerome, Lady Randolph Churchill, making him a relative of her son, British Prime Minister Winston Churchill.
