= Brandon Prichard =

American politician (born 2001)

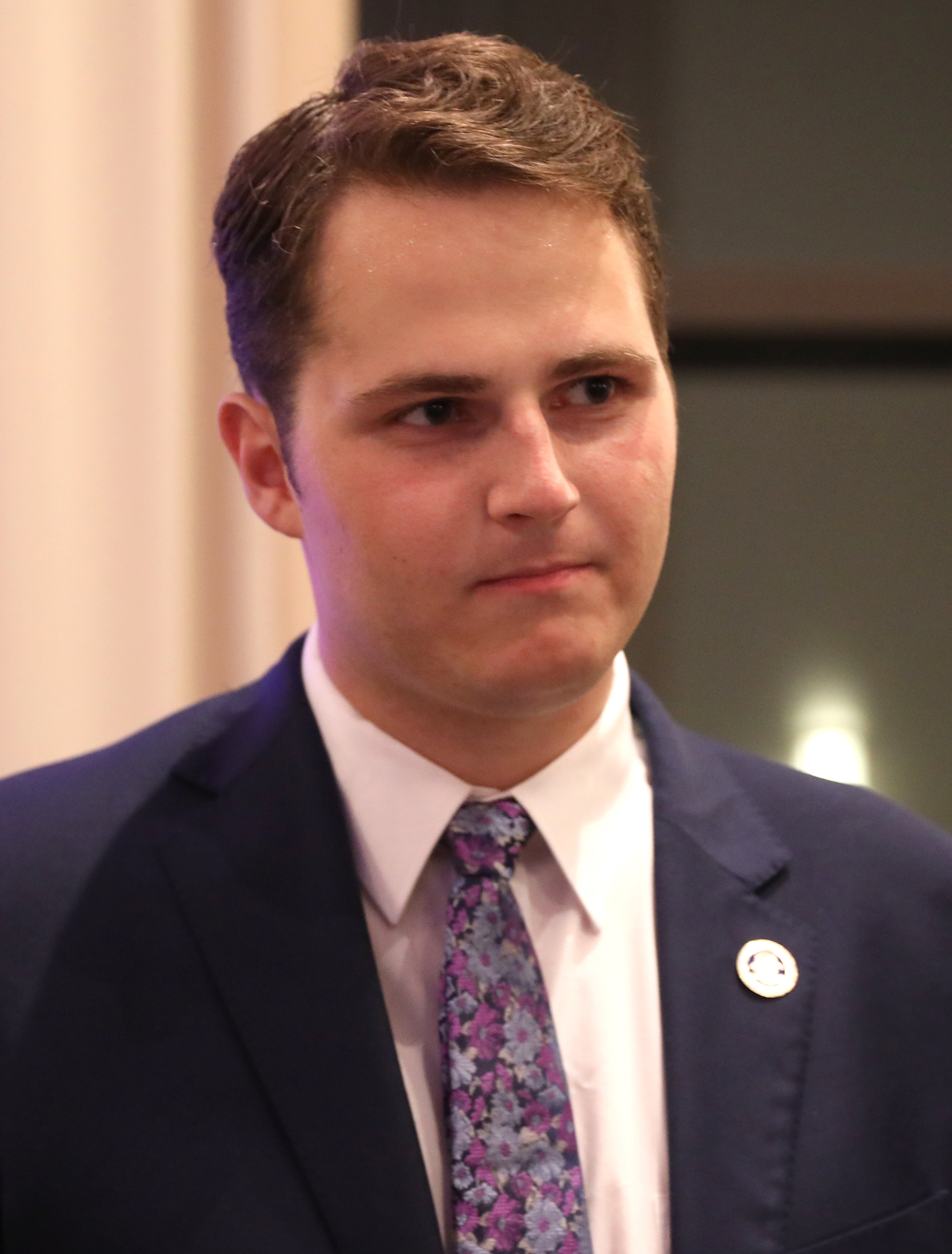
- Prichard in 2023

Member of the North Dakota House of Representatives from the 8th district
- In office December 1, 2022 – December 1, 2024
- Preceded by: Jeff Delzer
- Succeeded by: Mike Berg

Personal details
- Born: May 29, 2001 (age 25) Bismarck, North Dakota, U.S.
- Party: Republican
- Spouse: Kathryn Schnaible (m. 2023)
- Education: University of Minnesota
- Website: Official website

Brandon Prichard (born May 29, 2001) is an American politician and member of the North Dakota House of Representatives for the Republican Party representing District 8 which encompasses parts of Bismarck and Linton. He assumed office in 2022. Prichard is among the youngest state legislators in the United States.

Noted for his far-right views, Prichard has been described as a key member of "a new generation of MAGA-aligned activists" in North Dakota politics, contrasted with traditionally conservative state Republicans. His election was therefore seen as a bellwether for the future of the North Dakota Republican Party.

== Early life and education ==
Prichard was born May 29, 2001, in Bismarck, North Dakota. He is a fifth generation North Dakotan. In 2019, Prichard graduated from St. Mary's Central High School, where he won three state championships in speech and debate. He was also selected as a delegate to the United States Senate Youth Program in 2018.

Prichard graduated from the University of Minnesota, where he claims to have "quadruple majored" in history, philosophy, political science and religious studies, along with minors in Islamic studies and Asian/Middle Eastern studies. He also claimed to have continued his education at the University of Minnesota Law School and School of Public Policy "on a part-time and virtual basis," which a spokesperson for the school confirmed was not possible. After his academic background began raising questions in the local media, Prichard attempted to negotiate with a journalist from The Forum of Fargo-Moorhead to provide evidence of his educational attainment in exchange for modifications to a different story about him.

In October 2023, Prichard mentioned being a law student while making an argument on the House floor, prompting the University of Minnesota Law School to confirm via social media that he was not enrolled at the school. Prichard responded by accusing the school of having an "anti-Christian" bias and suggesting that he might sue for unspecified reasons.

== Politics ==
=== Elections ===
On February 15, 2022, Prichard announced his candidacy in the 2022 election to represent the 8th district in the North Dakota House of Representatives, defining himself as "unequivocally pro-life, pro-liberty, and pro-gun rights." He also emphasized a "return to pre-Covid normalcy," vowing to "protect individual choice" for decisions like masking and vaccines. Prichard was elected to the seat – which encompasses parts of Bismarck and Linton – later that year.

On December 21, 2023, Prichard announced his intention to run for reelection. He lost renomination in June 2024 by 4 percent, to his 2022 opponents SuAnn Olson and Mike Berg.

=== Tenure ===
In August 2022, Prichard was revealed to be a member of a Telegram group called the North Dakota Young Republicans which "frequently featured bigoted slurs and white supremacist tropes" in its messages between members, including personal attacks against gay public figures and anti-Semitic conspiracy theories.

Prichard has sponsored numerous bills targeting LGBTQ people as part of the larger 2020s anti-LGBTQ movement. In January 2023, Prichard co-sponsored House Bill 1254, which sought to ban all forms of gender-affirming care for transgender minors and impose felony charges on doctors who perform transition-related surgeries. HB1254 passed the legislature and was signed into law by Governor Doug Burgum in April, drawing immediate condemnation from the Human Rights Campaign. This law caused North Dakota transgender youth to travel to Minnesota to receive healthcare; a group of families filed a lawsuit against HB1254 in September.

Other anti-LGBT bills sponsored by Prichard during his tenure include House Bill 1333, which classified drag shows as "adult-oriented businesses" and restricted their performances; it was similarly signed into law by Governor Burgum in April 2023. Bills sponsored by Prichard that did not pass include House Bill 1301, which aimed to impose civil penalties on doctors who perform transition surgeries on minors, and House Bill 1332, which sought to legalize conversion therapy.

In October 2023, over the course of several days, Prichard made a series of social media posts advocating for Christian nationalism, specifically calling for enshrining Christian beliefs into state and federal constitutions. He argued that "every conservative state should put into code that Jesus Christ is King and dedicate their state to Him" and that "Real conservatives will never put the constitution above natural law". Prichard's tirade also included anti-LGBT rhetoric, writing in another post that "All schools should have LGBTQ history taught and lesson one should be Sodom and Gomorrah."

Prichard received swift backlash for his comments. Former Republican U.S. Representative Joe Walsh responded by saying "Not in this country. Never. Our Constitution won’t allow it. And that’s a damn good thing. Shame on you." Additionally, Freedom from Religion Foundation (FRRF) Action Fund president Annie Laurie Gaylor said in an open letter to Prichard: "As a state representative, your duty is to support the state and federal constitutions and to protect the rights of conscience of your constituents, not to promote your personal religious views, much less a Christian theocracy. Your oath of office has charged you with great responsibility over citizens, including those citizens who may not or do not share your personal religious viewpoints. You have shown that you are unfit for this responsibility." Prichard responded by posting "I will not listen to a godless out-of-state interest group like FFRF."

In December 2023, in a since-deleted Tweet, Prichard criticized the newly redesigned flag of Minnesota, remarking that the state allowed "baby-murder, gender mutilation of kids, and refugee camps in downtowns." In another Tweet the following month, he said “The LGBTQ agenda is evil and bad for North Dakota” and asked, “What even is a queer?”

In February 2024, Prichard was accused of diverting over $120,000 in political donations to the Citizen' s Alliance Political Action Committee, of which he served as the executive director of the North Dakota chapter, as well as to himself. On May 5, 2024, a complaint was filed with the Federal Election Commission by a Bismarck resident accusing Prichard of violating federal campaign laws through his involvement with two super PACs, YR Victory Fund and Citizen's Alliance of North Dakota, both founded in 2023.

Prichard routinely shares, likes, and interacts with online content shared by far-right and white nationalist figures such as Vince Dao, Lauren Witzke, Kyle Clifton, and John Doyle. He is also characterized by his frequent attacks on LGBT people on social media.

== Personal life ==
On May 20, 2023, Prichard married Kathryn 'Katie' Schnaible, in Bismarck, North Dakota.

== Electoral history ==
Republican primary

North Dakota's 8th House of Representatives District Republican primary election, 2022
Party	Candidate	Votes	%
Republican	SuAnn Olson	1,488	30.45%
Republican	Brandon Prichard	1,369	28.02%
Republican	Mike Berg	1,116	22.84%
Republican	Scott McCarthy	913	18.69%
Total votes		4,886	100.00%

General election

North Dakota's 8th House of Representatives District general election, 2022
Party	Candidate	Votes	%
Republican	Brandon Prichard	4,910	50.64%
Republican	SuAnn Olson	4,786	49.36%
Total votes		9,696	100.00%
Republican hold			
Republican hold			

Republican primary

North Dakota's 8th House of Representatives District Republican primary election, 2024
Party	Candidate	Votes	%
Republican	Mike Berg	1,671	28.04%
Republican	SuAnn Olson	1,620	22.97%
Republican	Brandon Prichard	1,586	18.72%
Republican	Ken Rensch	1,069	17.94%
Write-in		14	0.23%
Total votes		5,960	100.00%
