= Jim Grueneich =

American politician

Member of the North Dakota House of Representatives from the 12th district
- In office 2016 – February 18, 2020
- Succeeded by: Mitch Ostlie

Personal details
- Born: James Grueneich
- Children: 3
- Education: Alexandria Technical and Community College

Military service
- Branch/service: United States Air Force

James Grueneich is an American politician who served as a member of the North Dakota House of Representatives for the 12th district from 2016 to 2020.

== Education ==
Grueneich attended the Alexandria Technical and Community College.

== Career ==
A veteran of the United States Air Force, Grueneich was elected to the North Dakota House of Representatives in 2016. Grueneich resigned from the House in February 2020 after moving outside his district. He was succeeded by Mitch Ostlie.

== Personal life ==
Grueneich is married and has three children. He is a member of the Benevolent and Protective Order of Elks and the Shriners.
