= Bob Skarphol =

American politician (born 1945)

Member of the North Dakota House of Representatives from the 2nd district
- Incumbent
- Assumed office 2000

Personal details
- Born: October 22, 1945 (age 80) Crosby, North Dakota, United States
- Party: Republican

Robert "Bob" Skarphol (born October 22, 1945) is an American politician. He is a member of the North Dakota House of Representatives from the 2nd District, serving since 2000. He is a member of the Republican party. Skarphol also served in the House from 1993 to 1997.
