= JoAnne Rademacher =

American politician

Member of the North Dakota House of Representatives from the 38th district
- In office January 19, 2024 – December 1, 2024
- Preceded by: Larry Bellew
- Succeeded by: Christina Wolff

Personal details
- Born: c. 1954 (age 71–72)
- Party: Republican

JoAnne Rademacher (born c. 1954) is an American politician. She has served as a member of the North Dakota House of Representatives, alongside Dan Ruby. She is a member of the Republican Party.
