= Alisa Mitskog =

American politician

Alisa Mitskog is an American politician who, as of 2017, sits in the North Dakota House of Representatives.

A chiropractor by profession, Mitskog has served in the North Dakota House of Representatives since 2015. She previously served on the Wahpeton, North Dakota City Council.
