= Mitch Ostlie =

American politician

Mitch Ostile

Member of the North Dakota House of Representatives from the 12th district
- Incumbent
- Assumed office February 18, 2020
- Preceded by: Jim Grueneich

Personal details
- Born: Mitchell Ostile
- Party: Republican
- Children: 3
- Education: Mayville State University (BS)

Mitchell Ostlie is an American politician and insurance salesman serving as a member of the North Dakota House of Representatives from the 12th district. He was appointed to the position on February 18, 2020.

== Education ==
Ostile earned a Bachelor of Science degree in education from Mayville State University.

== Career ==
Ostile is the owner of an insurance company. He has also served on the Jamestown, North Dakota School Board and Jamestown Planning and Zoning Committee. He was selected to serve as a member of the North Dakota House of Representatives by the District 12 Republican Executive Committee, succeeding Jim Grueneich.
