= Steve Vetter =

American politician

Member of the North Dakota House of Representatives from the 18th district
- Incumbent
- Assumed office December 1, 2016

Personal details
- Party: Republican
- Education: University of Mary (BS)

Steve Vetter is an American politician serving as a member of the North Dakota House of Representatives from the 18th district. Elected in November 2016, he assumed office on December 1, 2016.

== Education ==
Vetter earned a Bachelor of Science degree in business administration and organizational leadership from the University of Mary in Bismarck, North Dakota.

== Career ==
Outside of politics, Vetter works as a real estate property appraiser. He was previously a union-affiliated cement finisher and cement mason. Vetter was elected to the North Dakota House of Representatives in November 2018 and assumed office on December 1, 2016. Vetter is a member of the House Judiciary Committee and the House Government & Veterans Affairs Committee.
