= Mike Berg =

American politician

Member of the North Dakota House of Representatives from the 8th district
- Incumbent
- Assumed office December 1, 2024
- Preceded by: Brandon Prichard

Personal details
- Party: Republican
- Education: North Dakota State University
- Website: mikebergfornd.com

Mike Berg is an American politician serving as a member of the North Dakota House of Representatives from the 42nd district. A Republican, he was elected in the 2024 North Dakota House of Representatives election. Berg is a son of a veterinarian and a published author.
