= Century College =

Two-year college in White Bear Lake, Minnesota, U.S.

- Motto: Discover What's Next!
- Type: Public community college
- Established: 1967
- President: Angelia Millender
- Students: 12,000
- Location: White Bear Lake, Minnesota, United States
- Campus: Suburban, 170 acres (69 ha)
- Colors: Orange, Black & Gray
- Sporting affiliations: NJCAA
- Mascot: Woody Wood Duck
- Website: www.century.edu

Century College is a public two-year community and technical college in White Bear Lake, Minnesota. The college is a member of the Minnesota State system. Its educational offerings include career and technical programs and coursework designed for transfer to four-year colleges and universities.

== History ==
Century College traces its origins to 1967. Its predecessor, Lakewood State Junior College, later known as Lakewood Community College, graduated its first class in 1969. The college's technical-education predecessor originated as the 916 Vocational Technical Institute.

On January 1, 1996, Lakewood Community College and Northeast Metro Technical College merged to form Century College. Both predecessor institutions had joined the Minnesota State Colleges and Universities system in July 1995.

== Academics ==
Century College offers associate degrees, diplomas, and certificates. Its academic offerings encompass career and technical education intended to prepare students for employment, along with courses and programs designed for transfer to four-year colleges and universities.

The college also provides noncredit continuing education and workforce training. Its customized training offerings are developed with employers to address employee training needs.

== Accreditation ==
Century College is institutionally accredited by the Higher Learning Commission.

== Student life and activities ==
Student activities at Century College include fine and performing arts, with opportunities for performances and exhibitions. The college's intercollegiate athletic teams are known as the Wood Ducks and include baseball and women's volleyball.

== Notable alumni ==
- Bianca Virnig, politician and Minnesota state house representative
- Todd Porter, politician and North Dakota state house representative
