= Dan Ruby =

American politician (born 1964)

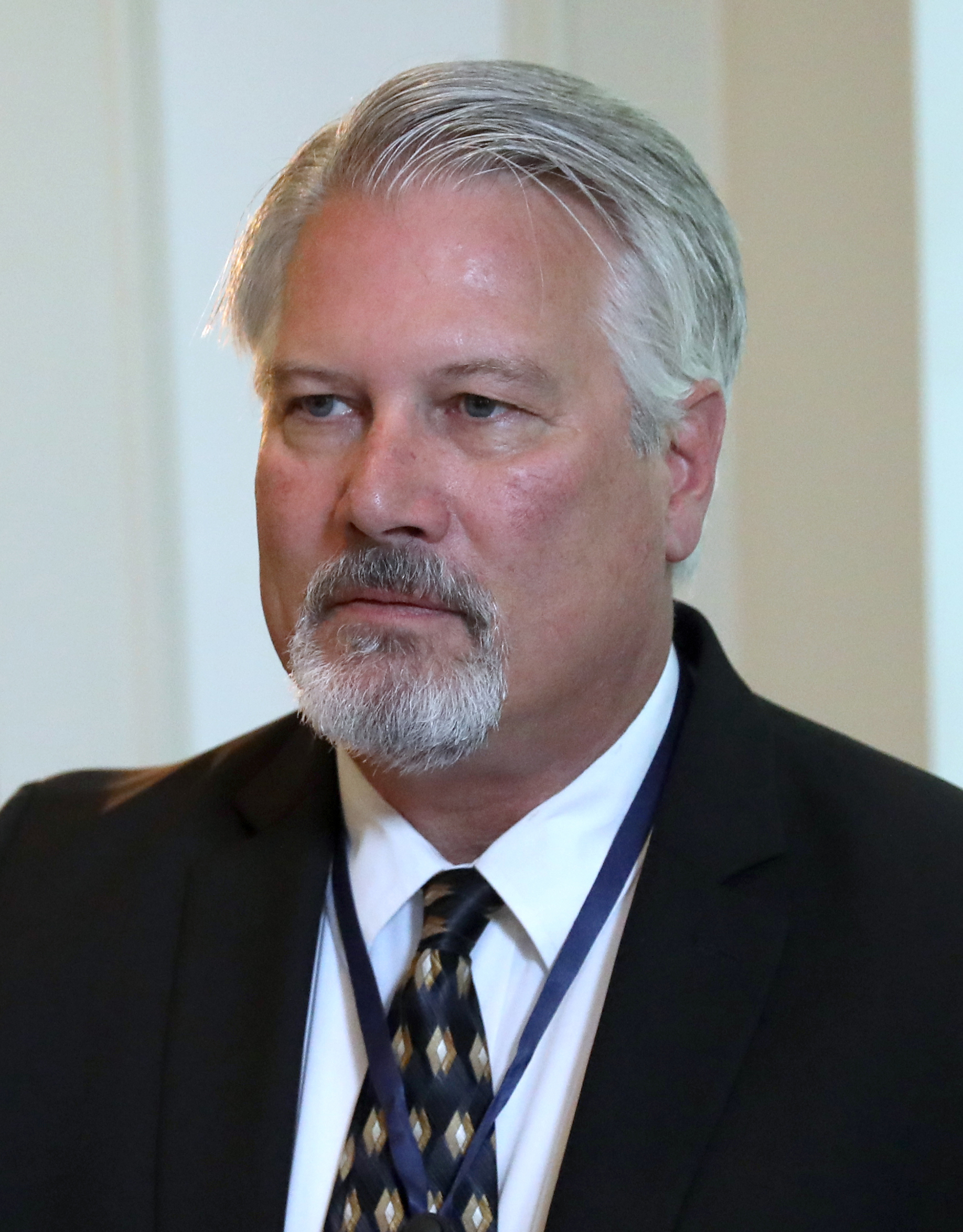

Member of the North Dakota House of Representatives from the 38th district
- Incumbent
- Assumed office 2000 Serving with JoAnne Rademacher
- Preceded by: Ben Tollefson

Personal details
- Born: December 1, 1964 (age 61) Minot, North Dakota, U.S.
- Party: Republican

Dan Ruby (born December 1, 1964) is an American politician. He is a member of the North Dakota House of Representatives from the 38th District, serving since 2000. He is a member of the Republican party. In 2024, Ruby won his re-election bid against Democrat Lisa Hermosillo.

During his tenure, Ruby has opposed bills that would require all retail stores statewide to close between midnight and noon on Sundays, with the intent to allow people to attend church. He stated, "The business community didn't ask for this, the general public didn't ask for this.” He has also supported and helped pass legislation that would permit cigar lounges in North Dakota.
