= Kelby Timmons =

American politician

Member of the North Dakota House of Representatives from the 26th district
- Incumbent
- Assumed office May 29, 2025 Serving with Roger A. Maki
- Preceded by: Jeremy Olson
- In office December 1, 2022 – December 1, 2024

Personal details
- Party: Republican

Kelby Timmons is an American politician. He is a member of the North Dakota House of Representatives from the 26th district. He is a member of the Republican party.

Timmons was elected to the House in 2022 but narrowly lost renomination in 2024. In May 2025 he was appointed to succeed resigned representative Jeremy Olson.
