= Jeremy Olson =

American politician

Member of the North Dakota House of Representatives from the 26th district
- In office December 1, 2022 – May 5, 2025
- Succeeded by: Kelby Timmons

Personal details
- Party: Republican

Jeremy Olson is an American politician. He served as a member of the North Dakota House of Representatives from the 26th district. He is a member of the Republican Party. Olson resigned from the North Dakota House in May 2025 following a harassment complaint made against him.
