= Lisa Meier =

American politician

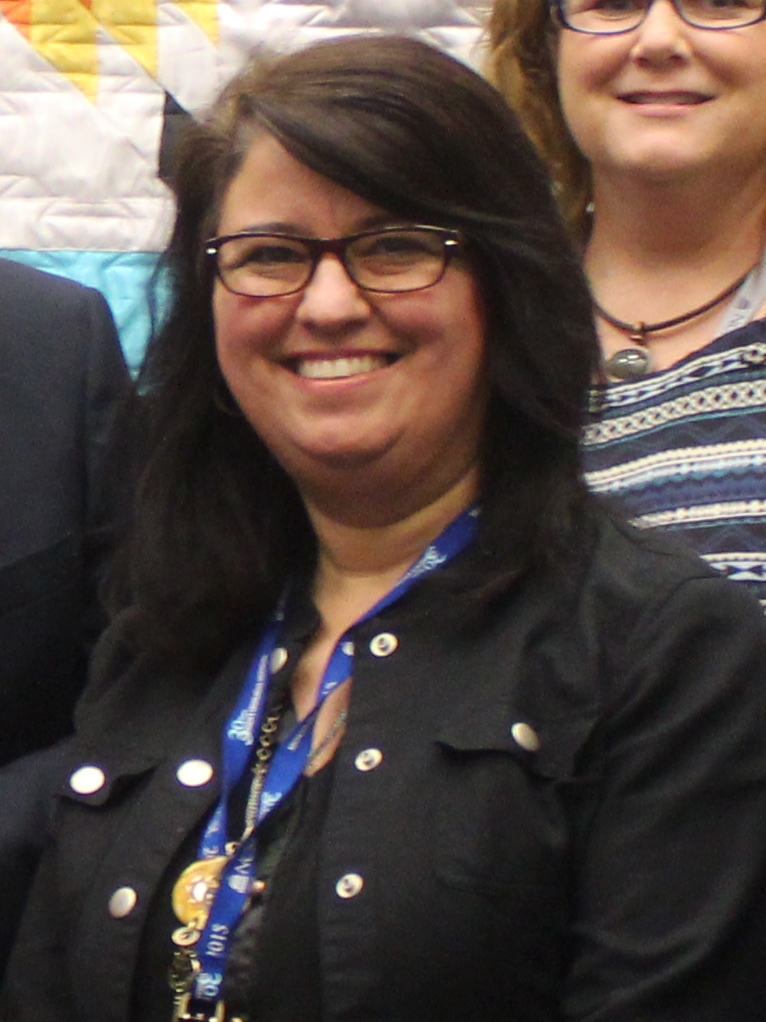

Member of the North Dakota House of Representatives from the 32nd district
- Incumbent
- Assumed office 2001

Personal details
- Born: Mandan, North Dakota
- Party: Republican
- Education: Bismarck State College (AS)

Lisa M. Meier is an American politician. She is a Republican representing District 32 in the North Dakota House of Representatives.

== Political career ==
Meier has been a member of the North Dakota House of Representatives since 2001.
