= Steve Swiontek =

American politician (born 1954)

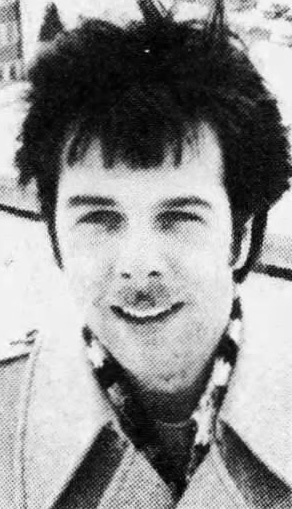

Member of the North Dakota House of Representatives
- Incumbent
- Assumed office December 1, 2022 Serving with Jared Hendrix
- Preceded by: David Monson
- Constituency: 10th district
- In office 1976 – 1984
- Constituency: 45th district

Personal details
- Born: Steven J. Swiontek; May 21, 1954 (age 71) Edgeley, North Dakota, U.S.
- Party: Republican

Steven J. Swiontek (born May 21, 1954) is an American politician and retired banker. He is serving as a member of the North Dakota House of Representatives, representing the 10th district. He is a member of the Republican Party.

Swiontek is the retired president and CEO of Gate City Bank.

== Early life and education ==
Swiontek was born on May 21, 1954, in Edgeley, North Dakota. He received a Bachelor of Science in economics and military science from the North Dakota State University. He was elected student body president during his time at the school. Swiontek has two children and three grandchildren and is married to Mary Anne Swiontek.

== Career ==
When Swiontek was 18 years old in 1972, he sought to attend the 1972 Republican National Convention as a delegate. He was selected, and became the youngest delegate to the convention.

Swiontek was first elected to the North Dakota House of Representatives in 1976, overtaking incumbent Kay Cann by nearly 800 votes. He stepped away from the legislature in 1984 to focus more on his family and banking career.

Swiontek served on the Fargo Board of Education from 1985 to 1991. In 2019, Swiontek was awarded the Legacy Leader Award by FMWF Chamber.

When legislative districts were redrawn for the 2022 election, friends and colleagues suggested Swiontek run for the 10th district, which he lived in. He initially declined, however he decided to run and filed for candidacy four days before the deadline. In 2023, Swiontek served as interim vice chair for the Water Topics Overview Committee; he also served as standing vice chair for the education and environmental division.

== Political positions ==
Swiontek describes himself as a "traditional" Republican.

== Electoral history ==
1976 North Dakota's 46th House of Representatives district general election
Party	Candidate	Votes	%
Republican	Steven J. Swiontek	3,653	29.74%
Democratic	Tom Matchie	3,142	25.58%
Democratic	Kay Cann (incumbent)	2,860	23.28%
Republican	Frank J. Richard	2,630	21.41%
Total votes		12,285	100.00%
