= Matthew Ruby =

American politician and military officer

Member of the North Dakota House of Representatives from the 40th district
- Incumbent
- Assumed office December 1, 2016

Personal details
- Born: Minot, North Dakota, U.S.
- Party: Republican
- Spouse: Dana
- Children: 3

Military service
- Branch/service: United States Army
- Unit: North Dakota Army National Guard

Matthew Ruby is an American politician and military officer serving as a member of the North Dakota House of Representatives from the 40th district. Elected in November 2016, he assumed office on December 1, 2016.

== Early life and education ==
Ruby was born and raised in Minot, North Dakota. He studied history and elementary education at Minot State University, but did not earn a degree.

== Career ==
Ruby has served as a member of the 815th Engineer Company with the United States Army. He also worked as a recruiter for the North Dakota Army National Guard. Since 2010, he has served as a staff sergeant and heavy equipment operator in the North Dakota Army National Guard. He is also the owner of 5R Construction. Ruby was elected to the North Dakota House of Representatives in November 2016 and assumed office on December 1, 2016.
