= Todd Porter (politician) =

American politician (born 1960)

Member of the North Dakota House of Representatives from the 34th district
- Incumbent
- Assumed office 1998

Personal details
- Born: November 17, 1960 (age 65) Bismarck, North Dakota, United States
- Party: Republican
- Education: Century College

Todd Porter (born November 17, 1960) is an American politician. He is a member of the North Dakota House of Representatives from the 34th District, serving since 1999. He is a member of the Republican party. Porter has been chairman of the House Energy and Natural Resources Committee since 2007. In 2019, controversy arose over Porter's business links to President of the North Dakota Petroleum Council and lobbyist Ron Ness. Porter denied that the links had any effect on his legislative behaviour.
