= Corey Mock =

American politician

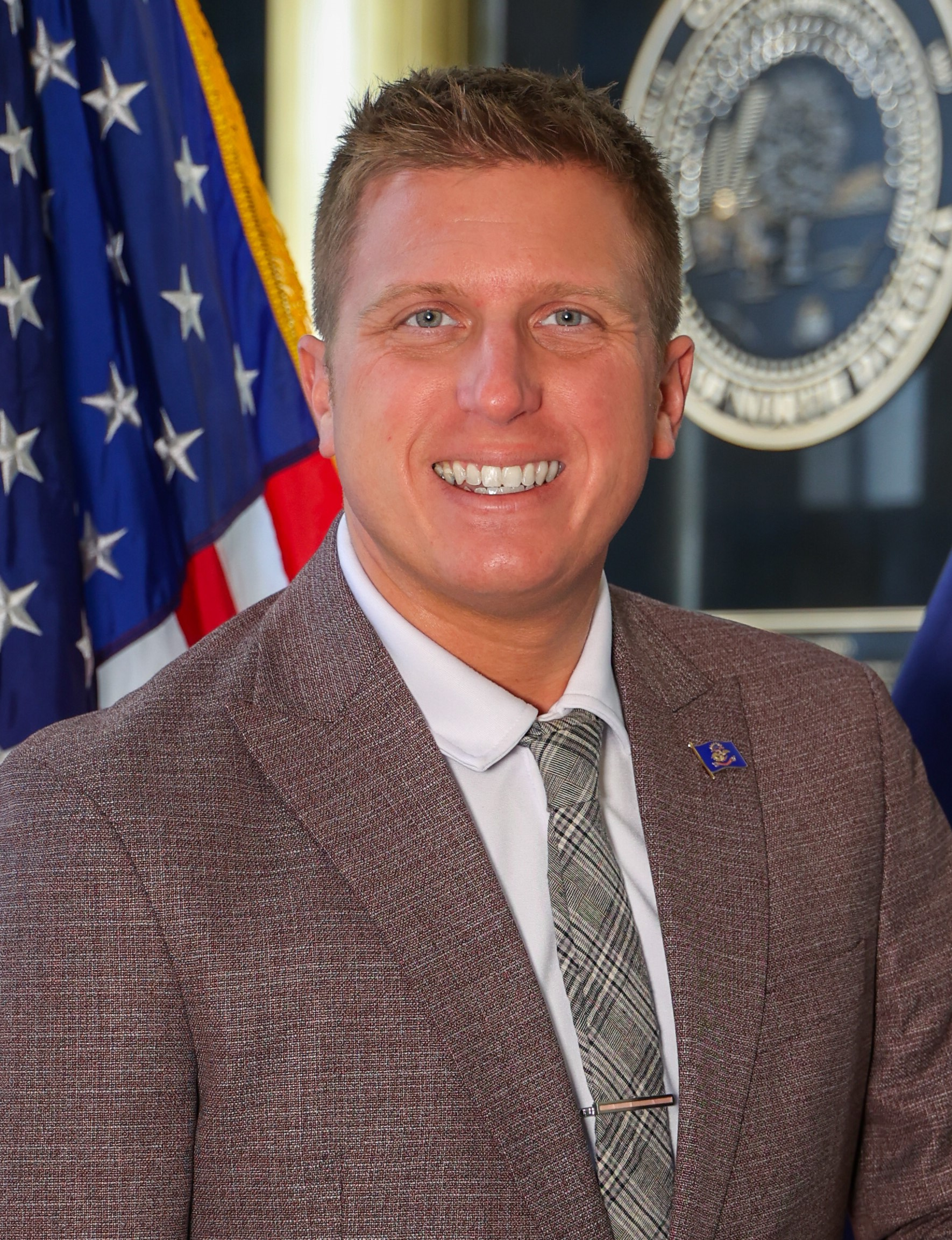
- Official portrait, 2025

Chief Information Officer of North Dakota
- Incumbent
- Assumed office December 15, 2024
- Governor: Kelly Armstrong
- Preceded by: Greg Hoffman

Minority Leader of the North Dakota House of Representatives
- In office December 1, 2016 – December 3, 2018
- Preceded by: Kenton Onstad
- Succeeded by: Joshua Boschee

Member of the North Dakota House of Representatives
- In office December 1, 2008 – November 30, 2024
- Preceded by: Donald Dietrich
- Succeeded by: Nels Christianson
- Constituency: 42nd district (2008–2016); 18th district (2016–2018)

Personal details
- Born: Corey Ray Mock; February 17, 1985 (age 41) Minot, North Dakota, U.S.
- Party: Democratic
- Education: University of North Dakota (BA)

Corey Ray Mock (born February 17, 1985) is an American public servant and politician from the state of North Dakota. A member of the North Dakota Democratic-NPL Party, he served in the North Dakota House of Representatives from 2008 until 2024 representing both District 42 in northern Grand Forks and includes the University of North Dakota from 2008 to 2016 and District 18, which covers downtown Grand Forks, from 2016 to 2024. On December 15, 2024, he was appointed Chief Information Officer of North Dakota and currently serves as a member of Governor Kelly Armstrong's cabinet.

== Biography ==
Mock was born and raised in Minot, North Dakota, where he graduated from Minot High School in 2003. He attended the University of North Dakota in Grand Forks, where he graduated with a degree in history with an emphasis in geography. From 2001 to 2008, Mock was a Northstar Hobby Stock and IMCA Stock Car racer, and he won the Governor's Cup in 2003.

== Career ==
Mock was elected to the North Dakota House of Representatives in 2008, representing District 42 from 2008 to 2016 and District 18 from 2016 to 2024. Over his 16-year legislative career, Mock held several leadership positions including Assistant Minority Leader (2012–2016), Minority Leader (2016–2018), and ranking member of the House Appropriations Committee (2019–2024). Mock also chaired the Legislature's Information Technology Committee from 2017 to 2021, providing oversight for statewide technology policy and digital infrastructure investments.

In October 2015, a speech Mock gave criticizing a loophole in North Dakota's campaign finance laws that allows candidates to keep leftover campaign funds for their personal use was featured on Last Week Tonight with John Oliver.

On December 15, 2024, Mock was appointed Chief Information Officer for North Dakota by Governor Kelly Armstrong. As the state's 9th CIO, he leads North Dakota Information Technology (NDIT), overseeing the state's IT strategy, cybersecurity, data management, application development, and enterprise infrastructure for over 60 state agencies. He serves as a core member of the Governor's cabinet and collaborates closely with the Office of Management and Budget (OMB) and Office of the Governor.

In addition to his work as a state legislator, Mock served as the executive director of the Third Street Clinic, a nonprofit free clinic that provides access to health care services for low-income residents of Grand Forks and Polk counties. He is a member of North Dakota Farmers Union, Rotary International, GF/EGF Chamber of Commerce, Young Professionals, Sons of Norway, Delta Upsilon fraternity, and is a volunteer at the Circle of Friends Humane Society. Mock also serves on the Board of Directors of North Dakota Leadership Seminar, Grand Forks Altru Family YMCA, and has been a staff member of American Legion North Dakota Boys State since 2003.

Party political offices
Preceded by Kristin Hedger	Democratic nominee for North Dakota Secretary of State; 2010	Succeeded by April Fairfield
North Dakota House of Representatives
Preceded by Kenton Onstad	Minority Leader of the North Dakota House of Representatives; 2016–2018	Succeeded by Joshua Boschee
