= 2026 North Dakota elections =

- November 3, 2026

A general election in the U.S. State of North Dakota was held on Tuesday, November 3, 2026, to elect officers to federal, state, and local government. Partisan primary elections were held on Tuesday, June 9, 2026. The Republican Party and the Democratic–Nonpartisan League will contest partisan elections throughout the state. This was the first election cycle in the state since 2020 in which every statewide race will be contested by Republicans and Democratic–NPLers.

== State party conventions and platforms ==
=== Democratic–Nonpartisan League Party ===
The 2026 Democratic–NPL convention took place in Bismarck from March 6–8, in which 452 delegates participated, the most since 2018. Keynote speakers included Mayor of Denver Mike Johnston. Several candidates were endorsed for statewide office, with the exception of tax commissioner and agriculture commissioner. The party issued a letter of support for Tracy Foss, who is running in the nonpartisan election for superintendent of public instruction. Resolutions passed by the convention included condemnation of the Second Trump administration's economic and immigration policies, and calling for the rollback of the state's near-total abortion ban.

=== Republican Party ===
The 2026 North Dakota Republican convention took place in Minot from March 28–29, in which over 700 delegates participated. Convention delegates only endorsed two candidates for the seven statewide partisan elections up for election: 2024 congressional candidate Alex Balazs for U.S. Representative against Trump-endorsed incumbent Julie Fedorchak, and Deven Styczynski for the six-year Public Service Commission post. The convention narrowly approved a motion, 318-312, that would strip party branding from Republican incumbent officials who did not attend: all statewide elected officials skipped the convention. Supporters of the motion characterized the absent incumbents as RINOS, or "Republicans in name only". The motion was controversial: Republican state representative Bernie Satrom from Jamestown described it as "really a stupid move." Many incumbents, including Agriculture Commissioner Doug Goehring, cited the 2024 convention and its divisiveness as their reason to not attend.

Fourteen resolutions were adopted by the convention. In one of the resolutions, the NDGOP declared that partisan primaries were unconstitutional and that the party would use the legislature to seek their abolition, thereby giving the party total control over its general election nominees. Other resolutions included reiterating the party's opposition to gay marriage (passing 583-17) and abortion (passing 589-11).

134 Republicans participated in a presidential straw poll at the convention. Of the top three candidates, U.S. Vice President JD Vance received 65 votes, just shy of a majority, U.S. Secretary of State Marco Rubio received 35, and Governor of Florida Ron DeSantis received seven. U.S. Interior Secretary and North Dakota native and former Governor Doug Burgum earned just one vote, and his name drew boos from the audience as the results of the straw poll were read.

== State elections ==
=== State legislative elections ===
==== Senate ====
All odd-numbered state senate districts are up for election in 2026.

==== House of Representatives ====
All odd-numbered state house districts are up for election in 2026, alongside elections for unexpired terms in the 26th and 42nd districts.

== Local elections ==
All county and city elections in North Dakota are nonpartisan.

=== Mayor of Fargo ===
The Mayor of Fargo is Tim Mahoney, re-elected in 2022. Mahoney is retiring. This will be the first mayoral election in Fargo since the state outlawed its use of approval voting. Declared candidates for the election are state senator Joshua Boschee, deputy mayor Denise Kolpack, Sekou Sirleaf, and commissioners Dave Piepkorn and Michelle Turnberg.

== Ballot measures ==
=== Primary election measures ===
Results by county of June Constitutional Measure 1 Yes: 70–80%; 60–70%; 50–60%

- June 2026 North Dakota Constitutional Measure 1 – Successful measure. Created a single-subject rule for future constitutional amendments.

=== General election measures ===
- 2026 North Dakota Constitutional Measure 1 – would require constitutional amendments that are initiated by citizens or referred by the state legislature to receive a 60% "Yes" vote to be adopted.
- 2026 North Dakota Constitutional Measure 2 – would require public schools to provide free breakfast and lunch to students.
