= Timeline of Fargo, North Dakota =

The following is a timeline of the history of the city of Fargo, North Dakota, USA.

== Prior to 20th century ==
- 1670 – Rupert's Land, or Prince Rupert's Land, is a territory established in British North America comprising the Hudson Bay drainage basin.
- 1811 – The Selkirk Concession (a land grant issued by the Hudson's Bay Company (HBC) to Thomas Douglas, 5th Earl of Selkirk) begins the Red River Colony colonization project.
- 1871 – A.H. Moore's house (residence) built.
- 1873
  - Headquarters Hotel in business.
  - Cass County established.
- January 5, 1875
  - Fargo incorporated in Dakota Territory.
  - First Cass County Courthouse built.
- 1876 – Population: 600.
- 1880
  - Fargo Daily Times newspaper begins publication.
  - Population: 2,693.
- 1889 – Town becomes part of the new U.S. state of North Dakota.
- 1890 – North Dakota Agricultural College opens.
- 1891
  - North Dakota Agricultural College College Hall (Old Main) is built.
  - Concordia College founded in nearby Moorhead, Minnesota.
- 1893
  - June 7: Fire.
  - Mechanical Arts Building built on North Dakota Agricultural College campus.
  - Opera house built.
- 1894 – Fargo Forum and Daily Republican newspaper in publication.
- 1897 – North Dakota Harness Company in business.
- 1898
  - Fargo Golf Club formed.
  - Fram Norwegian-language newspaper in publication.
  - Northern Pacific Railway Depot is built.
- 1899 – Cathedral of St. Mary built.

== 20th century ==
- 1900 – Population: 9,589; county 28,625.
- 1903
  - Public Library built.
  - St. Paul's Evangelical Lutheran church founded.
- 1904 – Fargo Street Railway begins operating.
- 1906
  - The Cass County Jail is built.
  - State Fair begins.
  - Grand Theater opens.
- 1908 – St. Luke's Hospital opens.
- 1912
  - April: Preacher Billy Sunday visits town.
  - July: Sangerfest (song festival) held.
- 1914 – Princess Theatre opens.
- 1915 – The Ford Building is built.
- 1917
  - Woodrow Wilson High School built and established.
  - John Miller Baer becomes U.S. representative for North Dakota's 1st congressional district.
- 1920
  - Pence Automobile Company Warehouse built.
  - Population: 21,961; county 41,477.
- 1922 – WDAY radio begins broadcasting.
- 1926
  - June 26: Gustaf of Sweden visits town.
  - Fargo Theatre built.
- 1927 – August 26: Charles Lindbergh visits town.
- 1928 – Regan Brothers Bakery in business.
- 1929 – Veterans' Hospital built.
- 1930 – Post Office and Courthouse built.
- 1931
  - Black Building in Downtown Fargo is built.
  - Fargo Civic Orchestra established.
- 1935 – Dovre Ski Slide erected.
- 1938 – Dacotah Field opens on the North Dakota State University campus.
- 1939 – June: Olav of Norway visits town.
- 1940 – November 7: Duke Ellington at Fargo, 1940 Live recorded.
- 1948
  - KFGO radio begins broadcasting.
  - American Crystal Sugar Company factory begins operating in nearby Moorhead, Minnesota.
  - The Gorman dogfight UFO incident occurs over Fargo.

- 1954 – Herschel Lashkowitz becomes mayor.
- 1955 – Dacotah Field is moved to the NDSU North Campus.
- 1957 – 1957 Fargo tornado.
- 1960 – North Dakota State University active.
- 1964 – Public educational KFME (TV) begins broadcasting.
- 1966 – Fargo North High School and Daughters of Dakota Pioneers established.
- 1969 – Red River Valley Genealogical Society founded.
- 1970
  - Bison Sports Arena built.
  - Population: 53,365; county 73,653.
- 1972 – West Acres Shopping Center in business.
- 1974 – Sister city relationship established with Hamar, Norway.
- 1975 – Plains Art Museum founded.
- 1978 – Jon Lindgren becomes mayor.
- 1983 – Greater Fargo-Moorhead Area Food Bank established.
- 1986 – Hector Airport terminal built.
- 1987 – Sister city relationship established with Vimmerby, Sweden.
- 1990 – Historic Preservation Commission established.
- 1992 – Fargodome stadium opens.
- 1996
  - Newman Outdoor Field opens.
  - Sundog company opened for business.
  - Fictional Fargo film released.
- 1997 – April: 1997 Red River flood.
- 1998 – City website online (approximate date).

== 21st century ==
- 2000 – Population: 90,599.
- 2004 – The Ed Schultz Show (radio program) begins broadcasting.
- 2006 – Dennis Walaker becomes mayor.
- 2007 – Open magazine begins publication.
- 2008 – Scheels Arena, initially known as "The Urban Plains Center" is built.
- 2009 – 2009 Red River flood.
- 2010 – Population: 105,549.
- 2013
  - Dakotah Field is renovated.
  - Sanford Medical Center construction begins.
  - Kevin Cramer becomes U.S. representative for North Dakota's at-large congressional district.
- 2014 – Tim Mahoney becomes mayor.
- 2016 – Bison Sports Arena is renovated and reopens as Scheels Center for the 2016-17 season.
- 2017 – Pride parade begins (approximate date).
- 2020 – RDO Building is built and becomes the tallest building in Fargo at 235 feet.
- 2021 – Woodrow Wilson High School renamed to "Dakota High School"
- 2023 – Lashkowitz High Rise is demolished.

== See also ==
- Fargo history
- List of mayors of Fargo, North Dakota

== Bibliography ==
Published in the 20th century

- Federal Writers' Project (1938), "Fargo", North Dakota: a Guide to the Northern Prairie State, American Guide Series, State Historical Society of North Dakota, ISBN 9780403021833 – via Google Books. + Chronology
- A Century Together: A History of Fargo, North Dakota, and Moorhead, Minnesota, Fargo-Moorhead Centennial Corporation (1975)
- Fargo-Moorhead: A Guide to Historic Architecture, R. Ramsey (1975)
- Fargo's Heritage, N. Roberts (1983)
- History and Growth of the City of Fargo: Historic Context Study, by Tim Holzkamm and Dean Dormanen, 1993. Revised and edited by David Danbom, 2001.
- Crossings: A Photographic Document of Fargo, North Dakota, C. McMullen & D. Arntson, et al. (1995)

Published in the 21st century

- "Fargo, North Dakota", CMJ New Music Monthly, July 2000
- The History and Growth of the City of Fargo, T. Holzkamm & D. Dormanen; D. Danbom (2001)
- Fargo, North Dakota: From Frontier Village to All-America City, 1875–2000, Heritage Publications (2001)
- Images of America: Fargo, North Dakota 1870–1940, D. Danbom & C. Strom (2002)
- David J. Wishart, ed. (2004). "Cities and Towns: Fargo, North Dakota". Encyclopedia of the Great Plains. University of Nebraska Press. ISBN 0-8032-4787-7.
- David B. Danbom (2005). Going it Alone: Fargo Grapples with the Great Depression. Minnesota Historical Society. ISBN 978-0-87351-546-7.
- Carroll L. Engelhardt (2007). Gateway to the Northern Plains: Railroads and the Birth of Fargo and Moorhead. University of Minnesota Press. ISBN 978-1-4529-1297-4.
