= LGBTQ history in North Dakota =

North Dakota's LGBTQ history predates statehood itself. Among the Indigenous nations of the Northern Plains – including the Mandan, Hidatsa, Arikara, Lakota, and Ojibwe peoples – individuals today recognized as Two-spirit fulfilled traditional gender-variant social roles within their communities, centuries before European contact. In the years following American settlement, LGBTQ history continued to unfold – from Mrs. Nash, a transgender woman at Fort Abraham Lincoln in the 1860s, to Dale Olson of Fargo, one of the first gay men to openly defend his sexuality on American television in 1954 – against a backdrop of legal suppression, repeated legislative defeats, and hard-won community resilience.

== Laws against homosexuality ==
Before European settlement in the 18th and 19th centuries, there were no known laws regarding same-sex sexual activity. The first criminal law against sodomy in North Dakota was enacted in 1862, then the Dakota Territory. It prohibited heterosexual and homosexual fellatio. The law was expanded in 1885 to include anal intercourse and fellatio.

The state's vagrancy laws were expanded in 1903 to cover anyone whose speech or conduct was deemed to be "lewd, wanton and lascivious". In State v. Nelson (1917), the North Dakota Supreme Court broadened the scope of the sodomy law to include acts of cunnilingus. In 1927 the law initially designed to permit the sterilization of mentally and physically disabled inmates was expanded to include anyone who the State authorities believed might be "habitual criminals, moral degenerates and sexual perverts".

The forced sterilization law was repealed in 1965. In 1973, the State legalized private, adult, consensual homosexual relations as part of a larger revision of the criminal code that set the universal age of consent at eighteen years.

== Prior to the 20th century ==
In the 1860s, Mrs. Nash, a transgender woman, served as Libby Custer's favorite laundress while at Fort Abraham Lincoln, south of Mandan, North Dakota.

== Mid 20th century ==
=== 1950s ===
In 1954, Dale Olson (February 20, 1934 – August 9, 2012), born and raised near Fargo, North Dakota, was the first man to appear on U.S. television self-identifying as homosexual, using a pseudonym and his face obscured. He was the first national secretary for the Mattachine Society, one of the first organizations of homosexual men. Olson went on to represent Hollywood legends throughout his career and worked on campaigns for major films. The Actors Fund of America named the lobby of its Los Angeles headquarters in honor of Olson and his partner Eugene Harbin, in November 2004. Actress Shirley MacLaine presented Olson with the Actors Fund Medal of Honor, the organization's highest honor, on July 12, 2012.

== Late 20th century ==
=== 1970s ===
In the 1970s some businesses tolerated gay customers in Fargo, North Dakota and Grand Forks, North Dakota. A bar in Fargo, North Dakota had a "gay section" and local Chinese restaurant transformed into a popular disco at night.

=== 1980s ===
In the 1980s, the Fargo City Mayor, Jon Lindgren, caused some controversy when he publicly supported gay rights and supported the efforts of a local gay businessman to open up a gay bar, "My Place". The bar remained the only gay bar in North Dakota, until it closed down in 1989.

In 1981, North Dakota Governor Governor Allen Olson signed Executive Order Number 10, which the Governor has recently said, in interviews with the Fargo Forum newspaper, was an attempt to protect State workers from anti-gay discrimination in employment, without expressly mentioning sexual orientation.

In 1981, the North Dakota Supreme Court, in the case of Jacobson v. Jacobson ruled that because of society's prejudices, the sexual orientation of a parent would be the deciding factor in child custody cases. This ruling was subsequently reversed in 2003 by the case of Damron v. Damron.

In 1982, University of North Dakota students, faculty and staff formed the Ten Percent Society, now known as the Queer & Trans Alliance. A chapter of the organization was subsequently set up in Fargo, North Dakota.

In June 1984, Fargo celebrated its first recognized gay pride week, with Mayor Jon Lindgren signing a decree formally recognizing the week's gay pride celebrations.

=== 1990s ===
In 1996, North Dakota lawmakers pass a State edition, "Defense of Marriage Act". The law bans legal recognition of same-sex marriage in North Dakota, including those marriages performed in other States.

In 1999, Equality North Dakota is formed to campaign for LGBT rights in North Dakota, especially the inclusion of sexual orientation and gender identity in the State civil right code. The chairman of the organization was Robert Uebel.

In 1999, a gay bar called I-Beam opened up in Moorhead, Minnesota, which is right across the river from Fargo, North Dakota. The bar attracted LGBT customers from all of North Dakota, as well as much of Western Minnesota. The bar closed down in 2011.

== 21st century ==
=== 2000s ===
In November 2004, North Dakota voters ratified "Measure 1". The Constitutional Amendment banned legal recognition of same-sex marriage and similar options, including civil unions. Public opposition to the ballot measure came from Equality North Dakota, as well as by the Democratic Governor candidate Joe Satrom and the Libertarian Party of North Dakota.

After 2004, Sherri and Vickie Paxon focused their energies in Bismarck. In late 2003, Dan Tokach and Ron Hildahl, and their friends started Dakota Good Friends to support Pride efforts, sponsor dances, and other social events. Dakota Outright emerged from Dakota Good Friends with Sherri and Vickie playing leading roles in Dakota OutRight, Q-Talk, LGBT support sessions, and Bismarck Pride. They also began doing LGBTQ cultural competency education in public health, churches, school conferences, universities, and other venues throughout the state. There were later legislative efforts, as well. Brad Perkins tried to reach out to HIV+ people through a support group, Caring Community Contacts.

In April 2009, the North Dakota legislature failed to pass a bill (Senate Bill 2278) that would have protected LGBT people from discrimination in employment, housing and public accommodations. The bill had passed in the State Senate, but did not have enough votes to pass in the State House.

=== 2010s ===
In September 2012, the North Dakota State College of Science football program dismissed Jamie Kuntz from the team after news broke that he was gay. The coach and the college insist that the decision was not motivated by Kuntz's sexual orientation, but because he had initially lied about it to his coach and had been seeing kissing his boyfriend.

In November 2012, Joshua Boschee was elected to the North Dakota State legislature, representing District 44. He is the first openly gay person to win a legislative seat in North Dakota, possibly the first openly gay person to hold any partisan, elected public office. Boschee later unsuccessfully ran for the North Dakota Secretary of State, thus being the first openly gay candidate for a statewide office.

In February 2013, the North Dakota legislature failed to pass a bill (Senate Bill 2252) that would have protected LGBT people from discrimination in employment, housing and public accommodations. The bill had failed in the State Senate.

In April 2015, the North Dakota legislature failed to pass a bill (Senate Bill 2279) that would have protected LGBT people from discrimination in employment, housing and public accommodations. The bill had passed in the State Senate and failed in the State House.

In April 2015, State Rep. Randy Boehning, a Republican legislator from Fargo, comes out as gay.

In February 2017, the North Dakota legislature failed to pass a bill (House Bill 1386) that would have protected LGBT people from discrimination in employment, housing and public accommodations.

A federal judge ordered in March 2018 a drilling rig service company working in North Dakota's Oil Patch to pay a former worker as part of an agreement to settle a lawsuit alleging harassment because he is gay. When filed in December 2016, it was the first case in North Dakota alleging an employer in the state had allowed an employee to suffer sexual harassment because of his sexual orientation. The judge's order for a settlement came a year later in December 2017.

In January 2019, The North Dakota Senate defeated legislation banning discrimination based on sexual orientation, again turning down efforts to add LGBT protections to state law. Senate Bill 2303 (Senate Bill 2303) failed in a 20–27 vote.

=== 2020s ===
In April 2020, delegates to the North Dakota Republican Party approved the party platform by a mail-in vote of 621–139. Those who voted included Governor Doug Burgum, United States Senators John Hoeven, Senator and Kevin Cramer, and United States House Representative Kelly Armstrong. Included in the platform was Resolution 31, which claimed civil rights legislation would allow LGBTQ people to "prey" upon straight and cisgender people. Several months later, when the media drew attention to Resolution 31, the text no longer appeared on the party's website. Many Republican delegates condemned the platform. Republican Gov. Burgum also opposed the anti-gay platform, calling it "divisive and divisional", and saying, "As I've long said, all North Dakotans deserve to be treated equally and live free of discrimination". The chair of the resolutions committee would not say who had written it.

Carrie Evans was elected to the Minot City Council in June 2020. Carrie is the first openly gay woman to hold elected office in the State.

In August 2020, the Turtle Mountain Band of Chippewa Indians legalized same-sex marriage by a vote of 6–2, the first Indian tribal reservation in North Dakota to do so.

In September 2020, the rainbow flag was briefly flown under the U.S. flag at the Minot City Hall. The following day, the Minot Daily News took a public stand with Mayor Sipma and council member Carrie Evans on the flag issue. The debate over the flag-raising that focused on Minot's LGBTQ2+ community entered a second round at September 21's Minot City Council meeting. The council voted to put any future flag raisings on hold until a policy is developed. During the meeting, a resident voiced his strong disagreement with that decision. Sipma responded, "It's been referenced a couple of times that there isn't hate or that they're not against those folks.... I've experienced a tremendous amount of hate towards me and towards the folks that fit under that umbrella. So, what led to my decision on that was also seeing a population within our community that does need to have that issue addressed—the issue of hate. When they came to me, they had stated that they wanted a call for kindness, not necessarily acceptance, but a call for kindness. And that I can appreciate."

In 2025, the North Dakota Senate voted 16-31 against a proposal urging the U.S. Supreme Court to reverse its 2015 decision legalizing same-sex marriage. The resolution had previously passed in the state House and would have made North Dakota the first state to make such a request. Democratic Senator Joshua Boschee emphasized the negative impact on the LGBTQ+ community in North Dakota, while Republican Senator David Clemens argued for the measure based on the state's constitutional definition of marriage.

Joshua Boschee was elected mayor of Fargo on June 9, 2026, defeating five other candidates. Boschee received 46.7% of the vote, nearly twenty points ahead of Michelle Turnberg, who received the second-highest number of votes. He is slated to be the first full-time mayor of the city.

== See also ==
- LGBT rights in North Dakota
