= North Dakota Senate Bill 2231 =

Failed 2023 law in North Dakota, U.S.

North Dakota Legislative Assembly
- Long title: AN ACT to create and enact sections 14-02.4-03.1 and 15.1-06-21 of the North Dakota Century Code, relating to preferred pronoun discriminatory practices and school policies on expressed gender.
- Territorial extent: North Dakota
- Considered by: North Dakota Senate
- Considered by: North Dakota House of Representatives
- Vetoed by: Doug Burgum
- Vetoed: March 30, 2023
- Voting summary: 34 voted for; 12 voted against; 1 absent
- Voting summary: 60 voted for; 32 voted against; 2 absent

Final stages
- Reconsidered by the North Dakota Senate after veto: March 30, 2023
- Voting summary: 37 voted for; 9 voted against; 1 absent
- Reconsidered by the North Dakota House of Representatives after veto: April 3, 2023
- Voting summary: 56 voted for; 36 voted against; 2 absent

Summary
- Prohibits school staff from using a student's preferred pronouns without permission from a legal guardian, parent or school administrator, and prohibits requirements to use a coworker's preferred pronouns in regards to government employers.
- Status: Veto override failed

North Dakota Senate Bill 2231 (SB. 2231) was a proposed 2023 law in the state of North Dakota that would have prohibited school staff, including teachers, from using a student's preferred pronouns if it differed from their sex assigned at birth, as well as prohibiting requirements that state employees use a coworker's preferred pronouns. The bill was vetoed by Republican governor Doug Burgum on March 30, 2023, with the North Dakota Legislative Assembly failing to override his veto on April 3.

A similar bill with different language regarding requirements passed the Legislative Assembly later in April 2023, which Burgum signed into law. In January 2023, the Legislative Assembly attempted to pass a bill that would have established a $1,500 fine each time somebody used a person's preferred pronouns differing from their sex assigned at birth, but did not pass.

== Legislative history and veto ==
Senate Bill 2231 passed the North Dakota Legislative Assembly in March 2023. Governor Doug Burgum vetoed the bill on March 30, 2023, believing it would cause lawsuits and disrupt teaching. Following the governor's veto, both the North Dakota Senate and House of Representatives considered a veto override. The override passed the Senate the same day as the veto but fell short of the 2/3 supermajority needed in the House of Representatives on April 3.

== Provisions ==
Senate Bill 2231 prohibited school staff from using the preferred pronouns of a student if said pronouns differed from their sex assigned at birth, as well as prohibiting government employers and agencies from requiring employees to use someone's preferred pronouns under the same criteria. It did not provide for any criminal charges if a person did not abide by the law. If a school administrator, guardian, or parent permitted the usage of a student's preferred pronouns, school staff would be allowed to refer to them by their preferred pronouns.

== See also ==
- LGBTQ rights in North Dakota
