= Eric Murphy =

Eric Murphy may refer to:

- Eric Murphy (Entourage), character on the TV series Entourage
- Eric E. Murphy (born 1979), United States federal judge
- Eric James Murphy (fl. 2020s), American politician and professor
- Eric Murphy (born 1989), son of comedian Eddie Murphy

== See also ==
- Erik Murphy (born 1990), American–Finnish basketball player
