= Delmore =

Delmore is a surname. Notable people with the surname include:

- Alycia Delmore, American actress
- Andy Delmore (born 1976), Canadian hockey player
- Derrick Delmore (born 1978), American figure skater
- Lois Delmore (1949–2026), American politician
- Vic Delmore (1915–1960), baseball umpire
- The Delmore Brothers, country music duo
