= 2013 Grand Rapids flood =

Flood in the Grand Rapids metropolitan area in April 2013

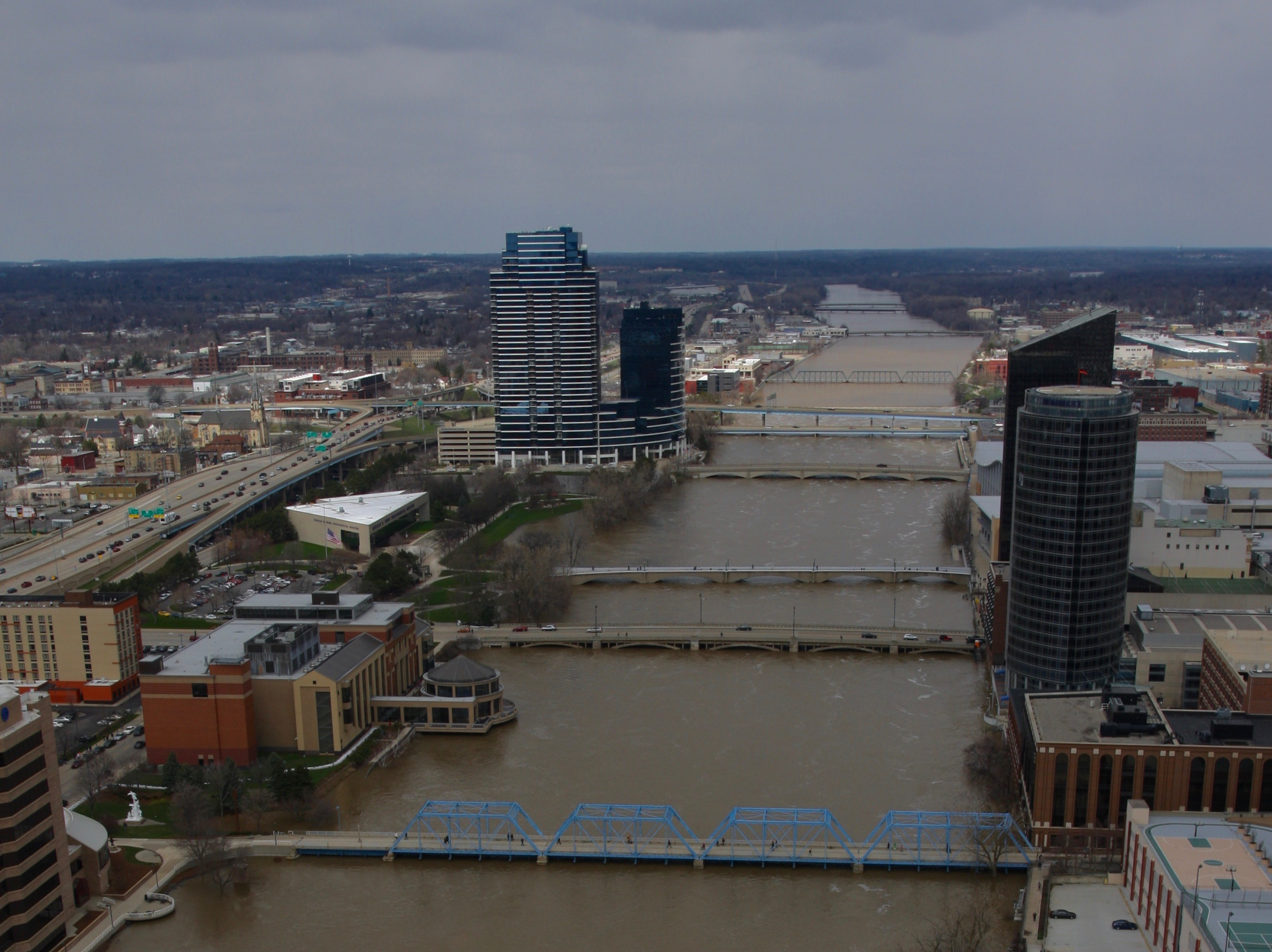
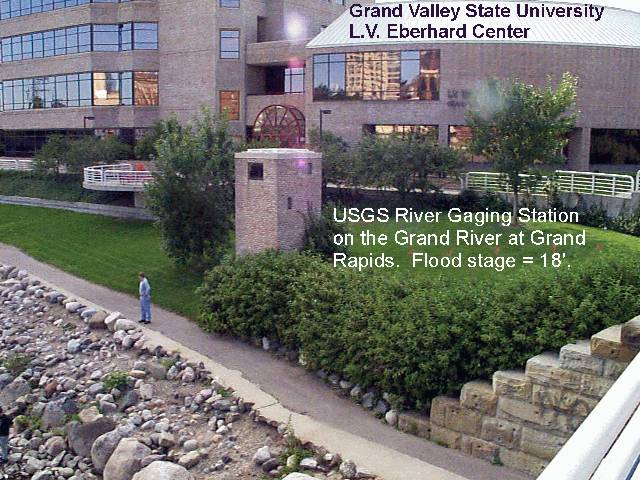
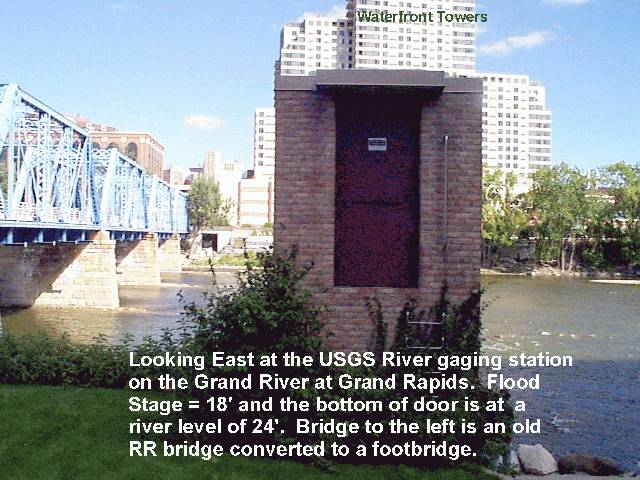
- Top to bottom, left to right: A view of Grand Rapids, with the gaging station visible in the lower left corner of the image. A man beside the gaging station. A view of the gaging station facing the Plaza Towers, labeled "Waterfront Towers".
- Date: April 12, 2013 – April 25, 2013; April 21, 2013 (crest)
- Location: * Comstock Park, Michigan; Grand Rapids, Michigan; Grandville, Michigan
- Deaths: None
- Property damage: +$10 million

The 2013 Grand Rapids flood lasted from April 12 to 25, 2013, affecting multiple areas in the Grand Rapids metropolitan area. Sudden heavy rainfall, saturation of the ground from rainwater and the flow of tributaries caused the Grand River to rise dramatically, with the river cresting at 21.85 feet (6.66 m) in Grand Rapids on April 21, 2013. The flooding caused thousands of residents in the area to evacuate their homes.

== Meteorology ==
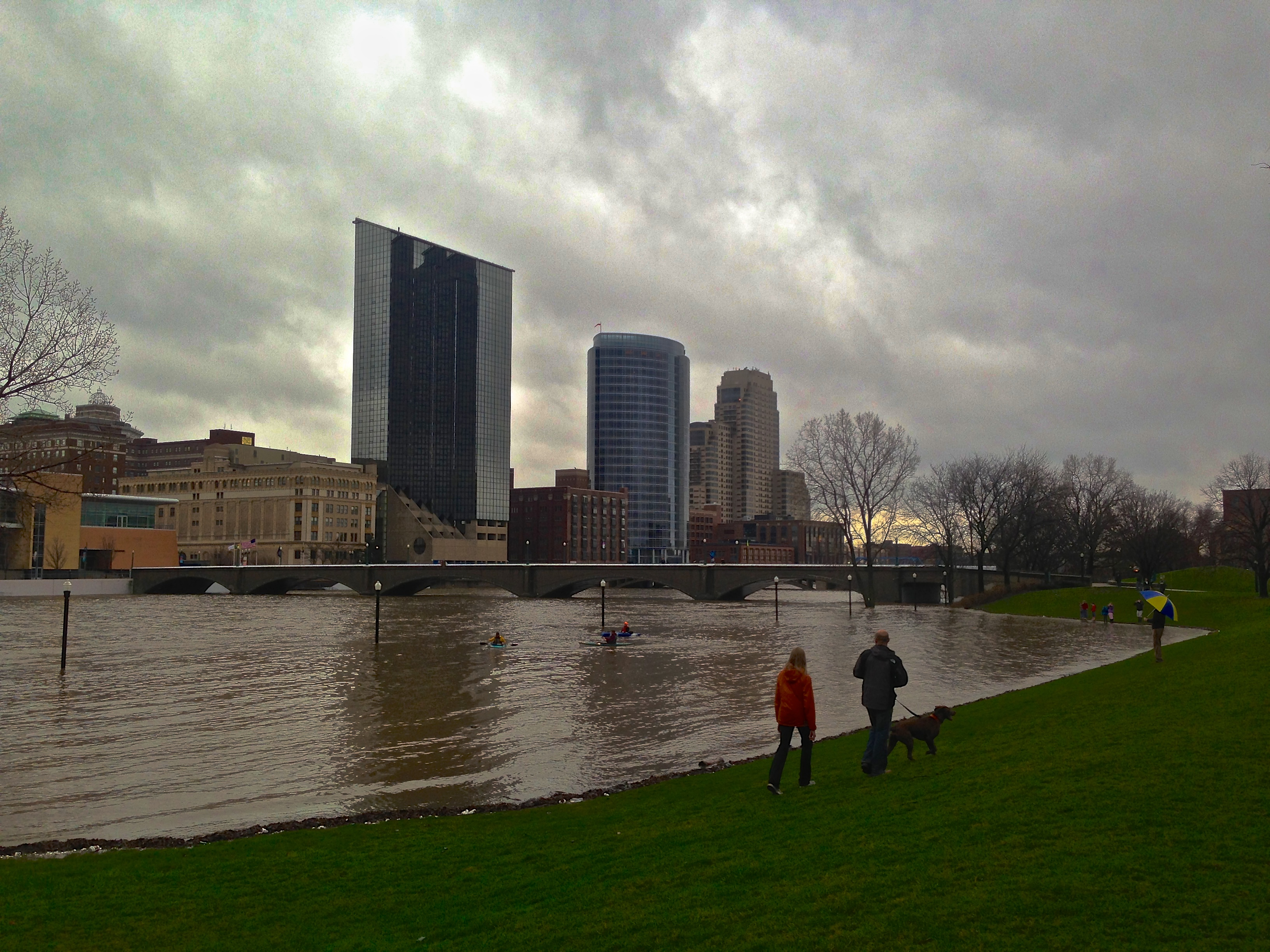
Grand River flood water settling near the Gerald R. Ford Presidential Museum with kayakers floating near light poles of a riverwalk.

In April 2013, heavy rain throughout the Midwest caused severe flooding in the region. In a period between April 8 and 15, Grand Rapids received 3.50 inches (89 mm) of rain, while the upriver community of Comstock Park received about 5.04 inches (128 mm) of rainfall. Within that period on April 13, the National Weather Service stated that floodwaters in Comstock Park rose from minor to moderate, with the flood stage beginning at 12 feet (3.7 m) and that day's level at 13.3 feet (4.1 m).

On April 17, Grand Rapids received about 0.83 inches (21 mm) of rain. Rainfall broke a 104-year-old record on April 18 with 9.1 inches (230 mm) of rain falling by 9:30 a.m. EDT.

On April 21, in Comstock Park, the Grand River crested at 17.8 feet (5.4 m), 5.8 feet (1.8 m) above the 12-foot (3.7 m) flood level while in Grand Rapids, the river rose to 21.85 feet (6.66 m), or 3.85 feet (1.17 m) above the 18-foot (5.5 m) flood level. A storm deemed "catastrophic" that had the potential to drop 3 to 4 inches (76 to 102 mm) of rain had also barely missed the Grand Rapids area on the day that the water crested in the Grand River. Rain totals for the month of April were about 11.10 inches (282 mm).

== Impact ==
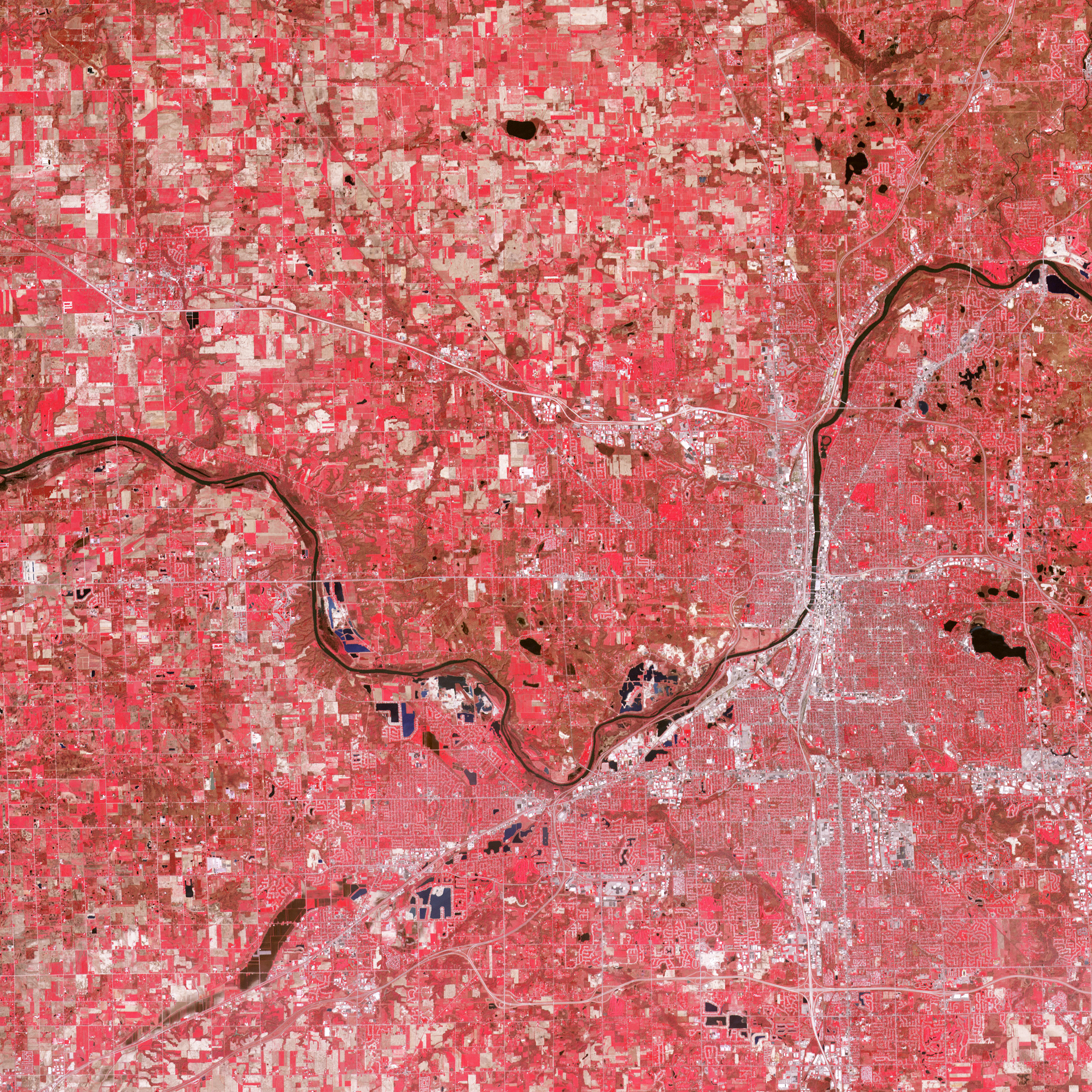
ASTER image of the Grand River on April 30, 2007

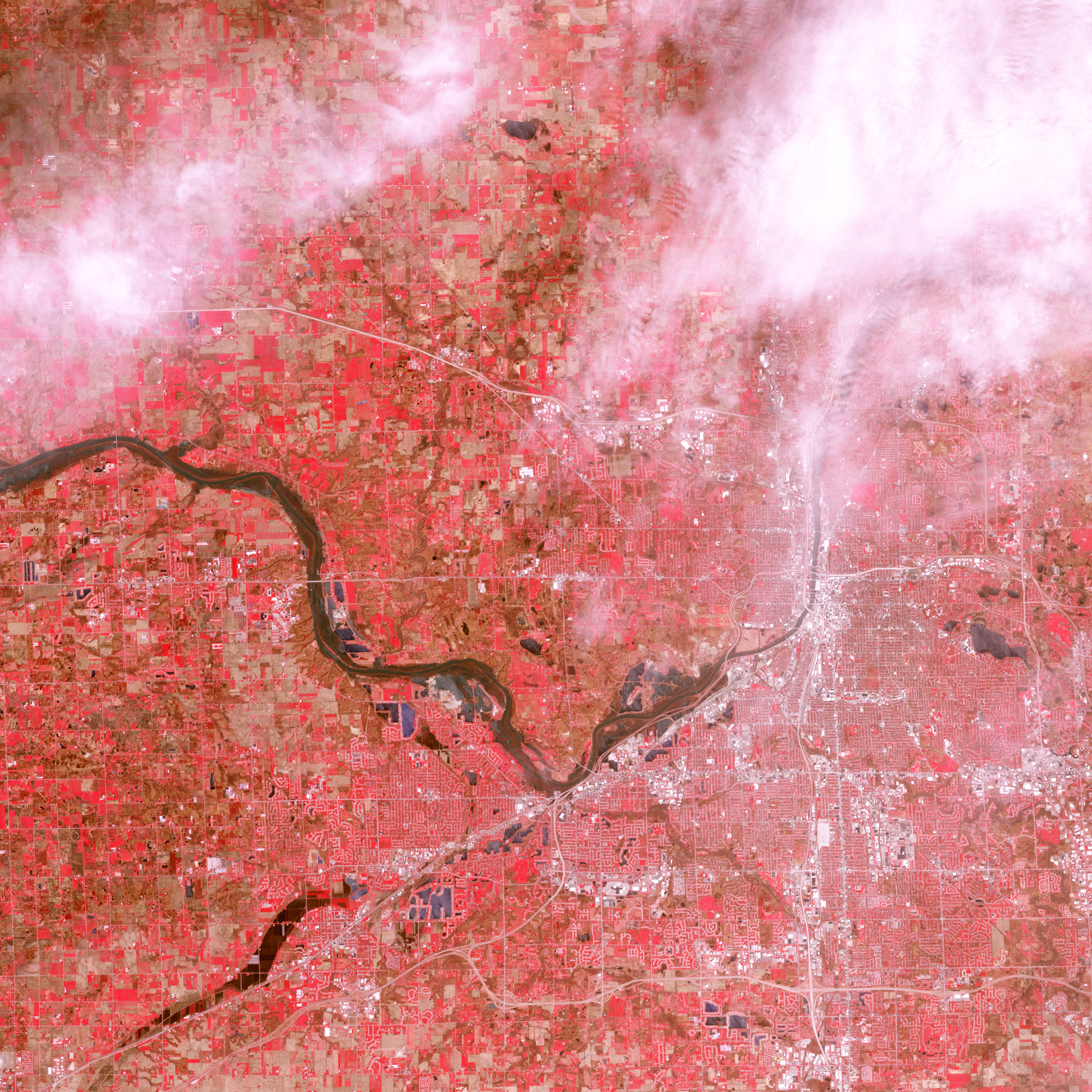
ASTER image of the Grand River on April 30, 2013

On April 21, Mayor of Grand Rapids, George Heartwell, declared a state of emergency. Evacuations of homes were reported along with some reports about boat rescues from houses in the area. In Kent County, about 700 people were evacuated while 1,000 people alone were evacuated from the Plaza Towers in downtown Grand Rapids. Some buildings in Grand Rapids near the riverfront had the Grand River's waterline go over their windows with some individuals able to see fish and ducks swim by through the windows.

Flood walls and bridges in Grand Rapids caused some increased flooding in cities up and downstream from the Grand River since they impeded the flow of the river, causing water to stand and rise. Wastewater treatment plants in Grand Rapids, Grandville and Wyoming had partially treated wastewater overflow from their facilities. The Grand Rapids wastewater plant had about 429 million US gallons (1.62×10^{9} L) of the partially treated water spill into the Grand River.

=== Response ===
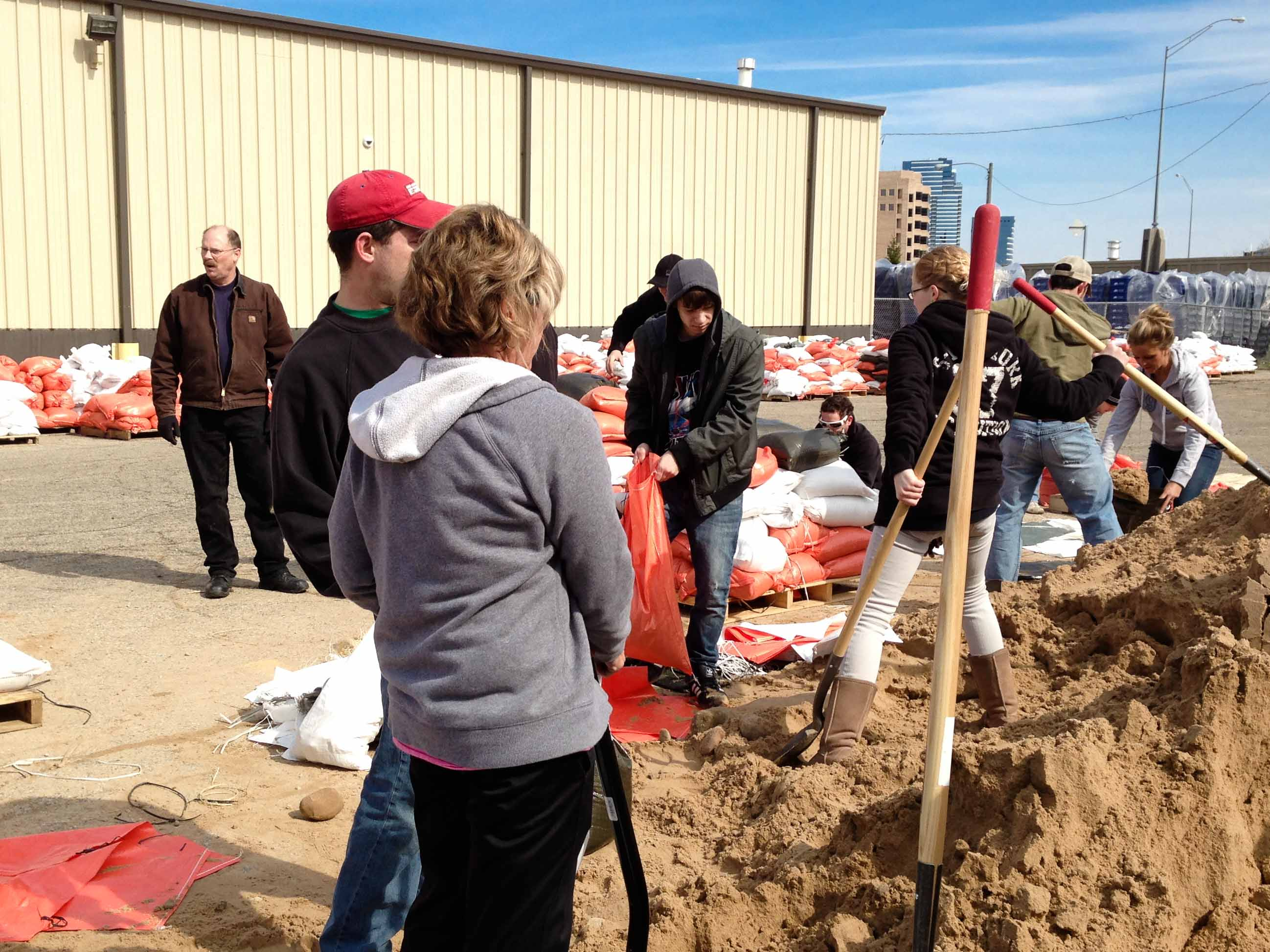
Grand Rapids residents filling sand bags.

The American Red Cross of West Michigan deployed to heavily affected neighborhoods in the area. They also opened multiple shelters for people who had to evacuate their homes due to the rising waters. Shelters were opened at the Kentwood Activities Center in Grand Rapids, Alpine Baptist Church in Comstock Park, and the First Baptist Church in Lowell. Shelters also opened in Ionia County at the Ionia Armory Community Center; Ottawa County at the Hudsonville Congregation United Church of Christ; and Newaygo County at the TrueNorth Community Services building. During the floods, thousands of residents in the Grand Rapids area volunteered to fill over 100,000 sand bags that were to be used throughout the territory. Near the Grand Rapids wastewater facility, a 1.25-mile (2.01 km) wall of sandbags were placed. CSX Transportation also placed train cars full of salt on a 110-year-old trestle bridge that crossed the river near Wealthy Street in order to weigh down the bridge from the rising floodwaters below it.

== Aftermath ==
The state of emergency declared by Mayor Heartwell lasted until May 24 in order to give more time for officials to gather information about the impact of the flooding.

Following the flooding, thousands of sandbags had to be removed with some possibly being stored for future use for other floods. Discussions were also held on whether to turn the wall of sandbags near the Grand Rapids wastewater facility into a permanent berm for future protection.

In the spring of 2014, Grand Rapids and Walker started a $703,000 contract to install flap gates and to perform repairs to existing flood walls. In August 2014, Grand Rapids also released plans to remove obstructions in the Grand River and to raise the berm near their wastewater plant. After initial claims by Grand Rapids officials that the flood walls in the city were adequate, in November 2014, city officials decided to look at ways to heighten flood walls due to factors involving Federal Emergency Management Agency, climate change and a proposed river restoration project.

== See also ==
- 2013 Midwest floods
