= Evan S. Tyler =

American politician

Evan S. Tyler was a politician in the state of North Dakota.

Tyler was born on March 22, 1843, in Damascus, Pennsylvania. Eventually he moved to Owatonna, Minnesota, and later to Fargo, North Dakota. He married Clara Estella Barnes. On August 24, 1923, he died in Fargo and was later buried in Delavan, Wisconsin.

== Career ==
Tyler was the Mayor of Fargo from 1876 to 1877, and was a member of the North Dakota House of Representatives in 1889 and from 1895 to 1896. He served in the Union Army during the American Civil War.
