= 2013 Midwestern U.S. floods =

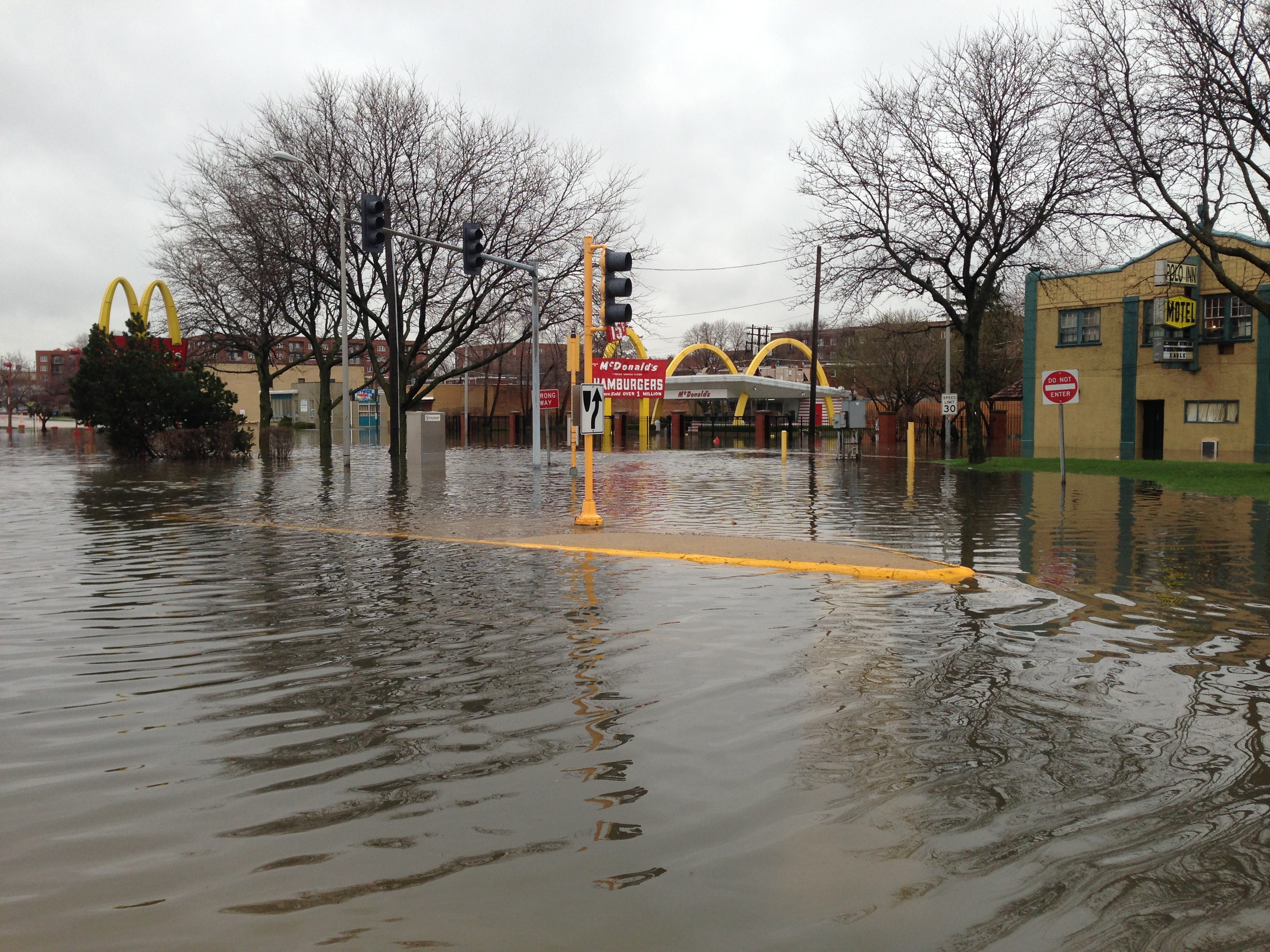
- Flooding along the Des Plaines River on April 18, 2013
- Cause: Heavy rains

Meteorological history
- Duration: April 17, 2013 – April 18, 2013

Flood
- Max. rainfall: 7.151 in (181.6 mm) in Hendricks County, Indiana

Overall effects
- Fatalities: 5
- Injuries: 3
- Damage: >$371 million
- Areas affected: Midwestern United States, particularly Illinois, Michigan, Indiana, eastern Missouri, eastern North Dakota

In April 2013, persistent heavy rains caused widespread flooding, primarily impacting the Midwestern and Great Lakes regions. In a span of two days on April 17 and 18, heavy rainfall associated with a slow-moving storm system caused widespread flooding across rivers and areas, where rainfall amounts over 8 inches (200 mm) caused rivers to swell and crest, including the Mississippi River and the Red River, with the latter river dealing with melting ice caps. The Grand River crested to a record level, prompting water rescues and evacuations in Grand Rapids, Michigan. A local state of emergency was declared for the city of Des Plaines, Illinois after the Des Plaines River swelled to 10.92 feet (3,330 mm). The governors of Illinois and Missouri declared state of emergencies, and the Federal Emergency Management Agency declared a federal emergency and a disaster declaration for 46 counties in Illinois. Five fatalities occurred: two each in Illinois and Indiana, with a fifth in Missouri. Three others were injured, all in Illinois.

== Meteorological synopsis ==
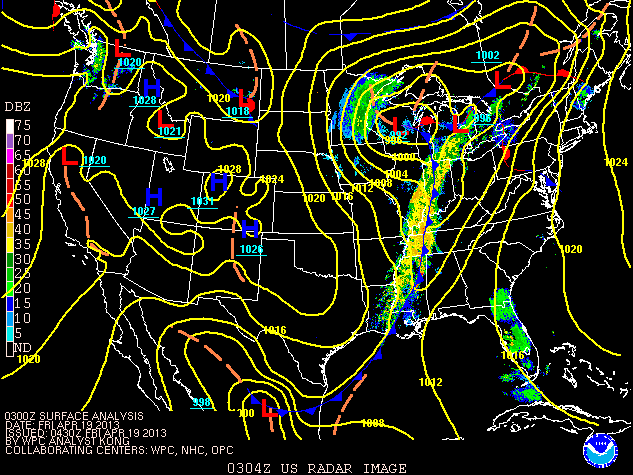
A surface analysis showing showers and thunderstorms producing heavy rainfall along a cold front moving across portions of eastern Illinois and western Indiana

An upper-level trough which was situated over the Great Lakes and Midwest regions moved into the Northeastern United States before being replaced by a strong ridge of high pressure over the Southeastern United States. This resulted in moisture being transported to the Great Lakes and Midwest regions, and upper-air weather soundings conducted by the National Weather Service Lincoln, Illinois, showed precipitable water values around 1.50 inches.

On April 17, a cold front approached the Midwest, pushing eastward towards the transported mass of moisture. However, the frontal boundary became parallel to a southwesterly upper flow and stalled over the Mississippi River. Trained thunderstorms along a quasi-stationary boundary front produced heavy rainfall across the Midwest before the storms headed eastward. The day after, an outflow boundary associated with the cold front caused additional thunderstorm development across the same areas that were saturated the day before. This resulted in flooding across east-central Illinois and western Indiana before an upper-level trough pushed the cold front eastward.

== Preparations ==
Volunteers and construction workers built emergency sand dikes and earthened levees in the Fargo, North Dakota–Moorhead, Minnesota, area. More than 400,000 sandbags were set up in the Moorhead area. Residents in Fargo, North Dakota began filling more than 750,000 sandbags to aid in protection from the floods. Prior to the flood event, a severe drought occurred across areas near the Red River.

In Missouri, areas along the Mississippi River placed sandbag levees and makeshift barriers. Prison inmates were driven to Clarksville to assist in building a floodwall of gravel and sand. The Missouri National Guard assisted with sandbag preparation efforts near Dutchtown.

In Solon, Iowa, sandbags were set up, and three pumps were delivered by the Department of Public Works. In Naperville, Illinois, North Central College cancelled classes and was closed on August 18. In Chicago, Major League Baseball decided to postpone a Cubs game against the Texas Rangers. Near Vincennes, Indiana, floodgates were installed to prevent the nearby Wabash River from overflowing, and added sandbags along portions of the river.

== Impact ==
=== Illinois ===
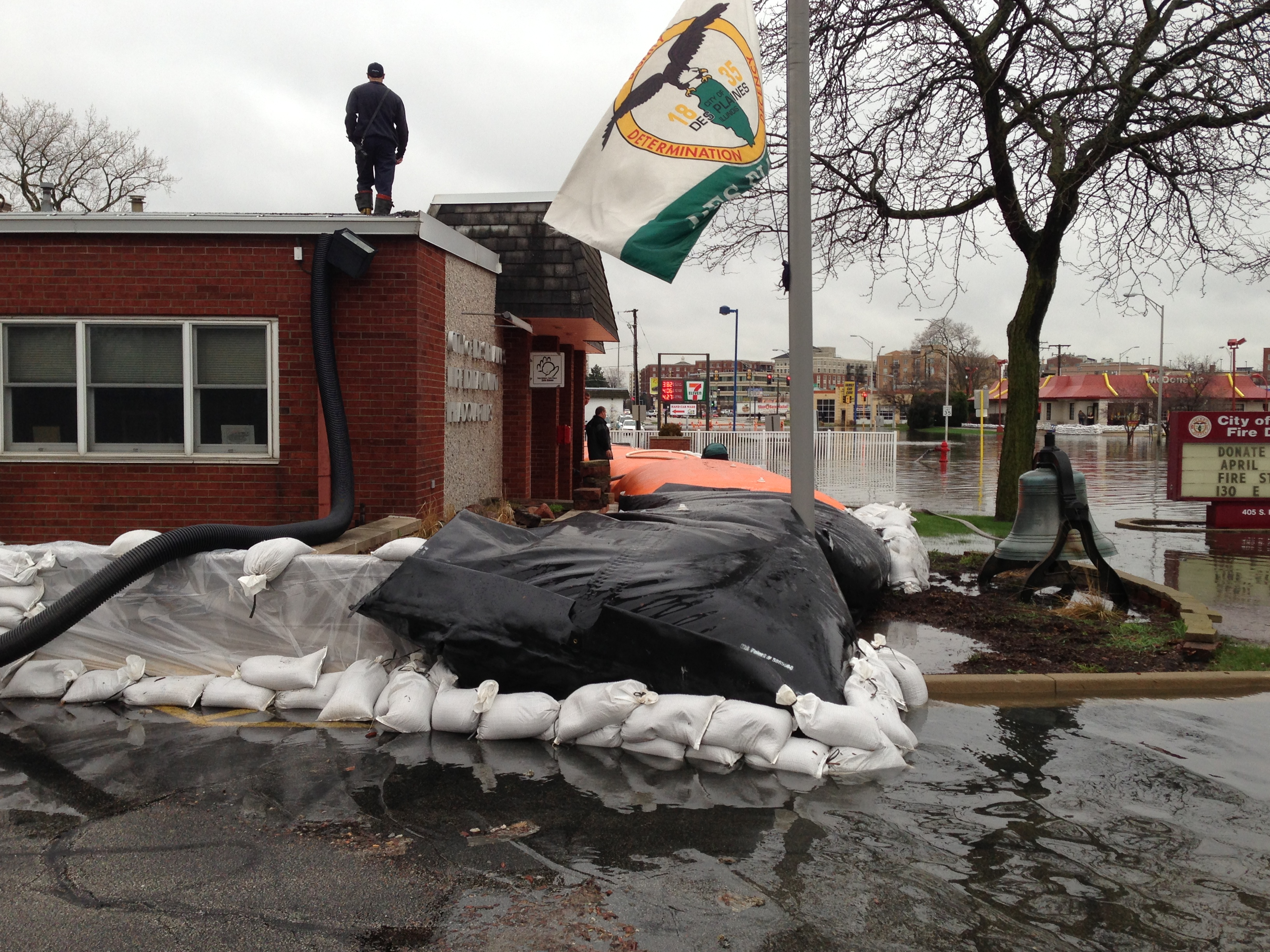
Flooding along the Des Plaines River on April 18

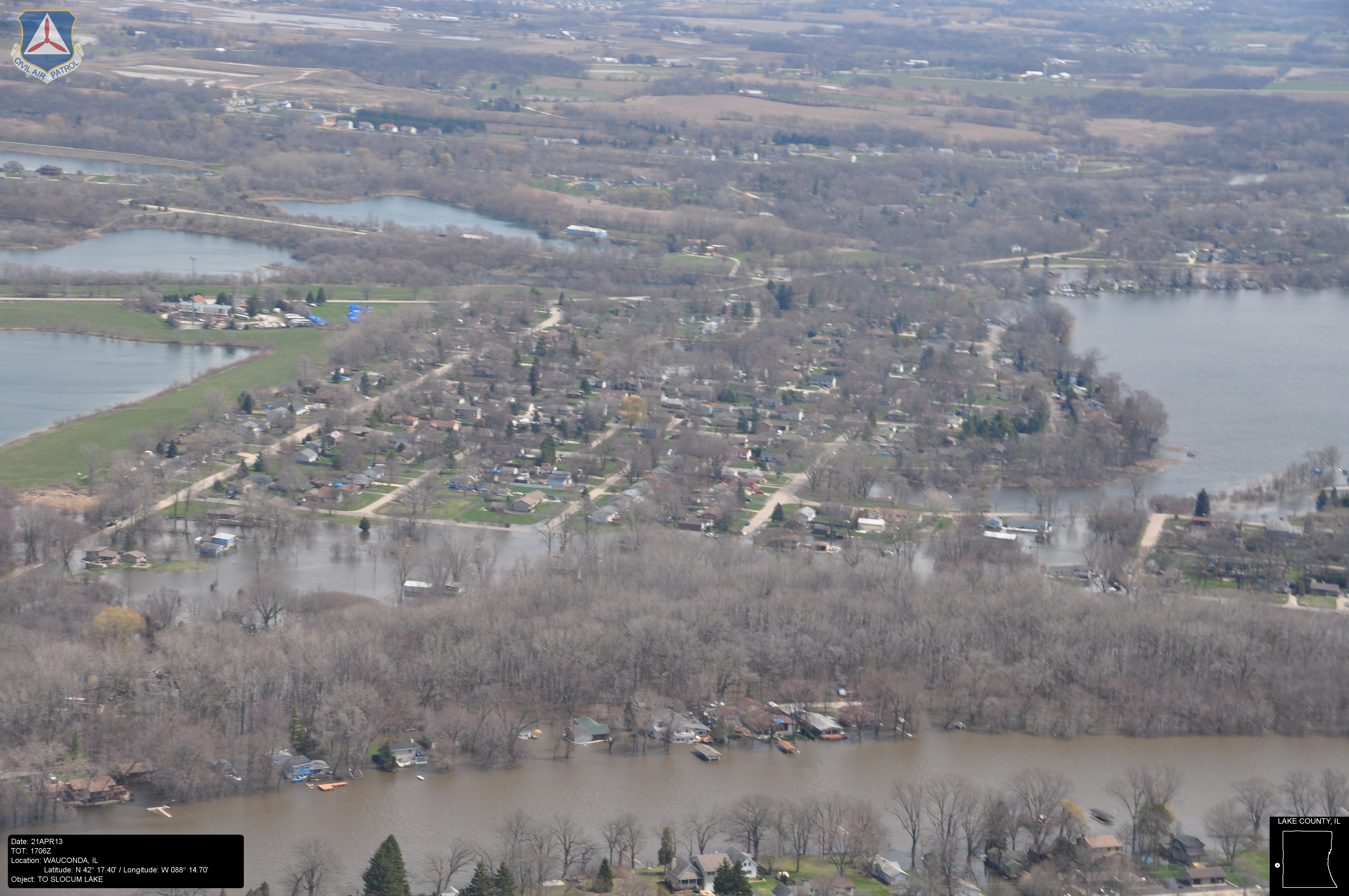
Flooding in Wauconda, Illinois, after the Fox River crested to a major flood stage

In Des Plaines, at least 800 homes and businesses were impacted, and 60 water rescues occurred. Residences were evacuated around Big Bend Lake in Des Plaines, and the Des Plaines River swelled 10.92 feet (3,330 mm), breaking the 1986 crest level record by 0.02 inches, and prompting a local state of emergency for Des Plaines. In Chicago, 3.54 inches (90 mm) of rain fell, which would add to the city's rainfall total to 8.54 inches (217 mm)–which was recorded as the wettest April on record in Chicago. Portions of the Kennedy, Edens, Eisenhower, Bishop Ford and Dan Ryan expressways were shut down, and a flash flood warning was issued for the city of Chicago. A portion of Interstate 74 shut down in Peoria and Tazewell counties. Chicago emergency management received more than 1,500 calls of flooding. Heavy rainfall filled the underground system of the Chicago River, which forced the river flow to be reversed to Lake Michigan.

In Clarendon Hills, homes and yards sustained "devastating" damage, while in downtown Naperville, streets were flooded and schools were cancelled the next day on April 19 because of flooding concerns. A branch of the DuPage River spilled over a levee protecting the river flooding, and a hospital in Morris evacuated 44 patients after floodwaters entered the basement of the hospital. In Utica, a mobile home park was evacuated, while water rescues were conducted in Marshall County. A levee breached in Lincolnshire, prompting 49 homes to be evacuated, and in Marseilles, 1,500 people were evacuated after a compromised levee flooded homes and infrastructure. Several homes were also evacuated in London Mills as numerous homes were inundated by floodwaters. Several streets and a parking lot at Scott Air Force Base was flooded. In Peoria, the city broke their 24-hour rainfall record, while Galesburg set a daily rainfall record on April 18, with 4.16 inches (106 mm).

The Illinois River near Peoria crested to 29.35 feet (895 cm) on April 23, which broke a crest record set 70 years prior, and 20 to 30 homes and businesses near the river were evacuated. The Illinois River at Henry was crested to a record 32.87 feet (10.02 m) on April 22, and the river at Beardstown crested to a record 29.81 feet (9.09 m) on April 27. The Illinois River at La Grange crested to a record 34.50 feet (10.52 m) on April 27, and some locations along the Kaskaskia, La Moine, Illinois, and Mississippi rivers hit major flood levels, with the latter two remaining above flood levels through the next month. Mudslides were also reported along the bluffs of the Illinois River in Peoria and Tazewell counties, covering U.S. Route 150 with several inches of mud and damaging a gas station in Tazewell County. All roads in Stark and Woodford counties were flooded as water rescues were conducted. Record flooding along the Spoon River in Fulton County damaged 40 homes in Bernadotte Township, Seville, and London Mills, with the downtown area of the latter location completely inundated by flash flooding caused by a levee breach along the river. Additional levees were breached along the river, resulting in thousands of acres of agricultural land, county roads, and nature preserves flooded. The Spoon River crested to a record 35.83 feet (10.92 m) in Seville on April 20, breaking the previous record crest by nearly 3 feet (0.91 m) and also was nearly 14 feet (4.3 m) above flood stage. The flooding caused a river gauge in London Mills to be disabled, and flooding along the Illinois River stemming from the April floods continued into the next month. The La Moine River crested to a record 32.54 feet (9.92 m) in Ripley on April 21, and the river did not subside below flood levels until April 26. At Beall Woods State Park, more than 100 acres (0.16 sq mi) was flooded, and extensive flooding occurred across northern Mount Carmel, with all but one local road east of a levee along the Wabash River flooded. The Wabash River near Mount Carmel also crested to 30.24 feet (9.22 m), which was the thirteenth-highest crest on record.

Two deaths occurred, one in Oak Brook and the other in Cora. Two injuries occurred when two homes collapsed into a basement in Peoria. One person in Chicago was hospitalized after their vehicle, along with two parked cars, was swallowed into a sinkhole. 550 flights were cancelled at O'Hare International Airport, while an additional 30 were cancelled at Midway International Airport. Floods damaged thousands of homes and structures across the state, and flood and hail damages totaled in excess of $371 million.

=== Michigan ===
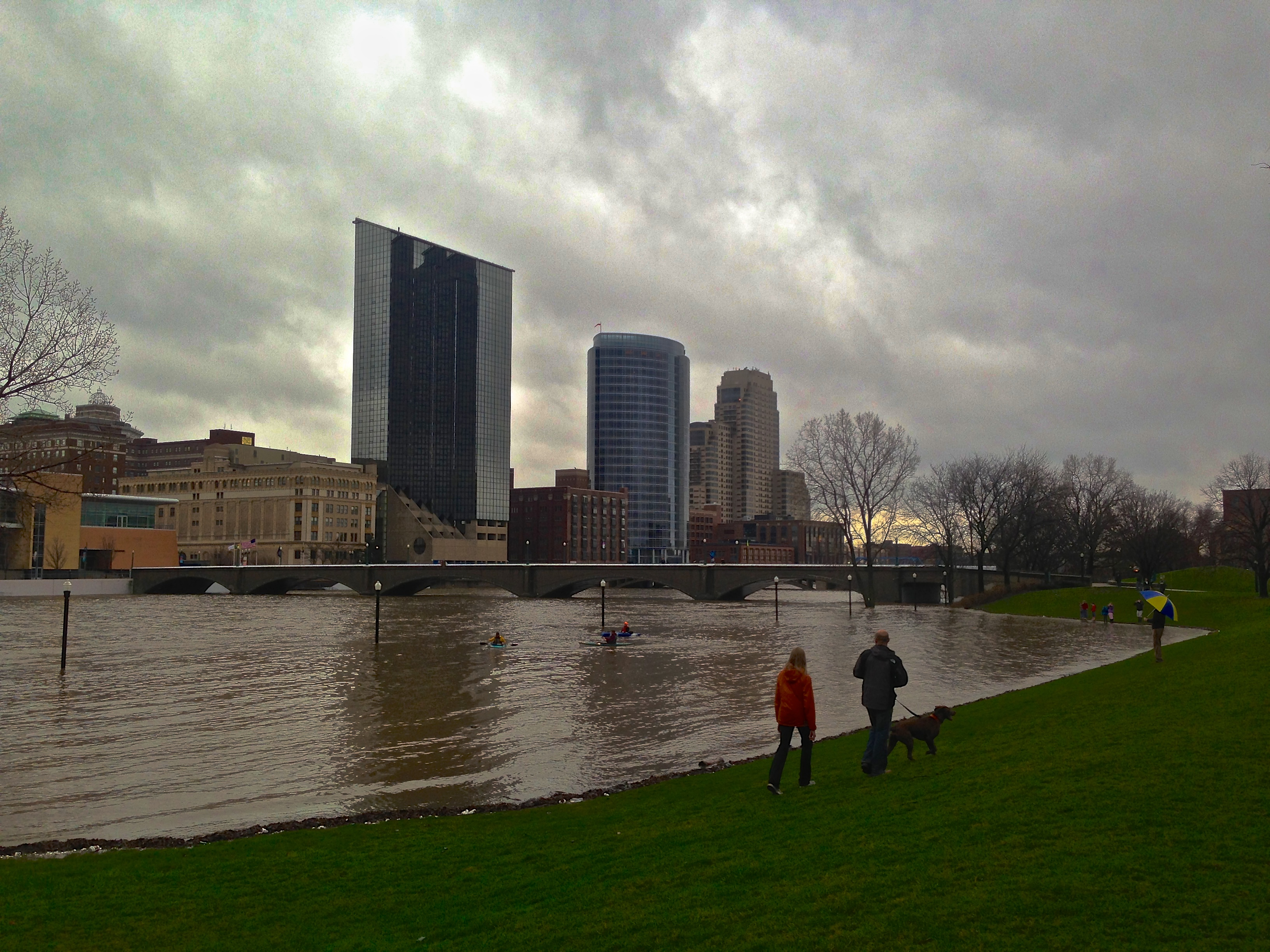
Flooding along the Grand River in Grand Rapids, Michigan, near the Gerald R. Ford Presidential Museum

The Grand River crested to a record 21.85 feet, breaking a 1985 river crest record, forcing evacuations and flooding downtown Grand Rapids. 9.1 inches (230 mm) of rainfall fell in Grand Rapids on April 18, breaking the previous rainfall record set in 1909. Sandbags were set up in downtown Grand Rapids along the Grand River, and 1,000 people were evacuated from the Plaza Towers. The Grand Rapids Public Museum was shut down after floodwaters surrounded the museum, despite sandbags that were set up around the building. The Grand River also flooded areas of Lowell and Ada Township and prompted evacuations in Wyoming for 25 homes. Buck Creek was flooded, leading to evacuations across Grandville, and minor flooding occurred along the Saginaw River. Parts of Shiawassee National Wildlife Refuge was flooded, and water topped the dike at Misteguay Creek in Saginaw County. Homes and businesses along the Tittabawassee River were flooded. Grand Rapids mayor George Heartwell declared a local state of emergency after low-lying areas in the city were inundated, forcing people to evacuate.

=== Indiana ===
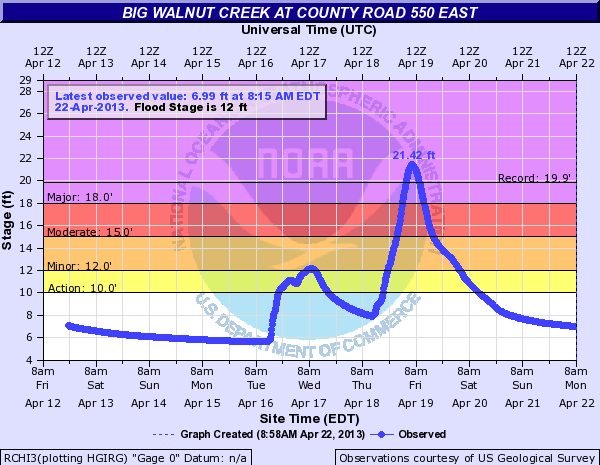
The Big Walnut Creek near a county road in Putnam County, showing a record flood stage level at 21.42 inches on April 19

Roads were flooded in downtown Indianapolis, and schools were closed in Zionsville and Lebanon. Two car crashes occurred on Interstate 465 and Interstate 65 after rain caused vehicles to hydroplane. A water rescue occurred in Brownsburg, and vehicles were inundated and stranded in Carmel and Westfield. The thunderstorms accompanying the heavy rain caused a lightning strike which damaged a US Airways plane on the runway at Indianapolis International Airport, according to airport officials, and another lightning strike damaged three homes in Hamilton County. Numerous creeks and rivers, including the Wabash River, crested above major flood levels. Flooding forced sandbags to be placed along the Little Calumet River and cancelled a flood-fighting drill in Gary. Two fatalities occurred when they were swept away by floodwaters along a crested Cicero Creek.

=== Missouri ===
In Ava, children and a bus driver were rescued after their school bus was surrounded by floodwaters. De Soto was flooded, resulting in nearly 5,000 power outages across the city. Near St. Louis, 114 barges were loosened, with some hitting Jefferson Barracks Bridge, forcing the bridge to close. Nearly 300 state roads were closed according to the Missouri Department of Transportation. Six levees north of St. Louis along the Mississippi River were overtopped. A woman was killed after she was swept away by a swelled Joachim Creek.

=== North Dakota ===
The Red River overflowed due to leftover melting snow caused by the heavy rainfall, which posed a flood threat to Fargo. However, temporary levees prevented significant flood damage. Fargo mayor Dennis Walaker recalled after the flood event, "Four floods in the last five years. That's extremely unusual."

== Aftermath ==
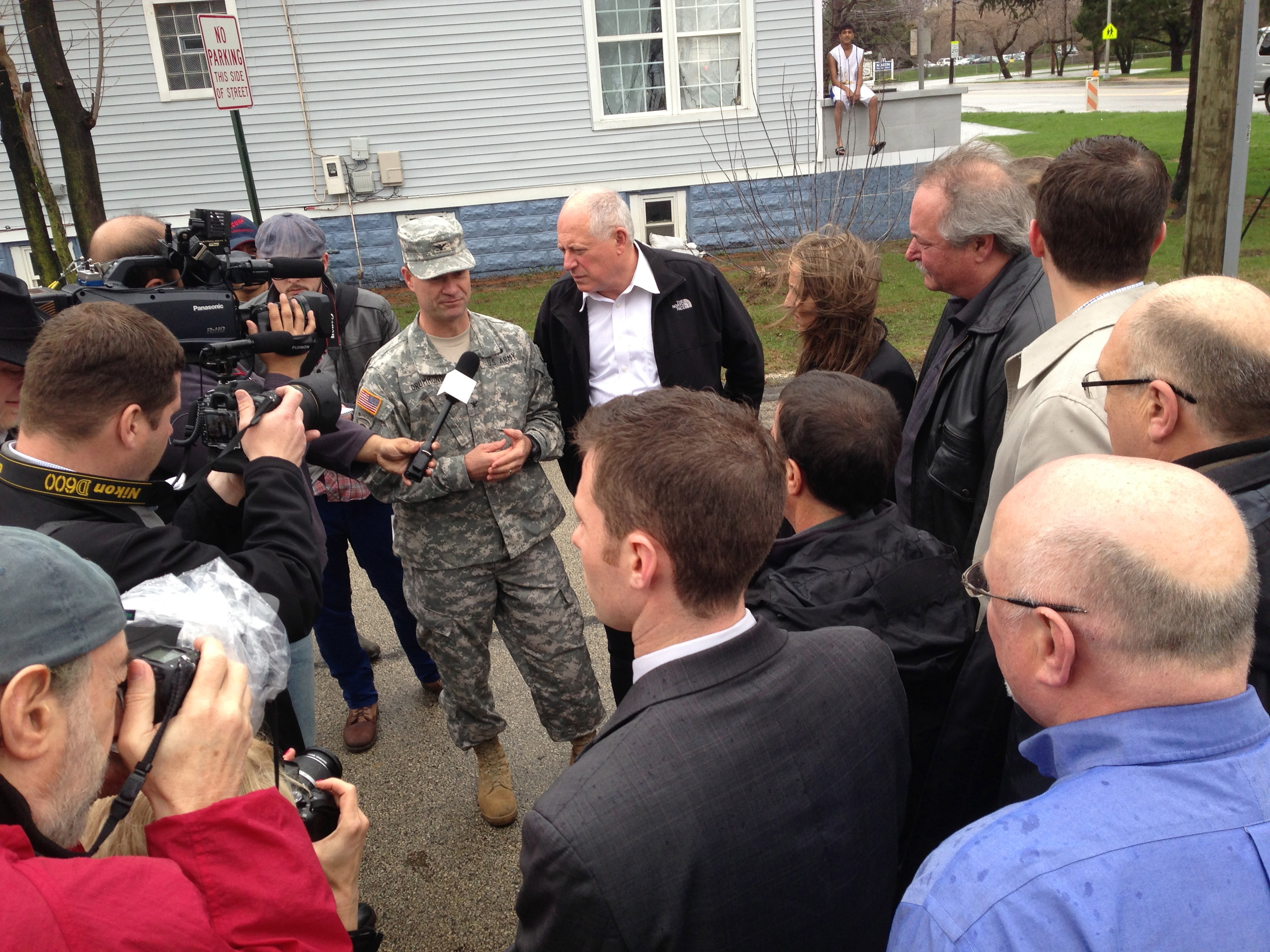
Illinois governor Pat Quinn and United States Army Corps of Engineers Chicago District commander Colonel Frederic A. Drummond Jr. speaking to media and public outlets about the flooding

Illinois governor Pat Quinn, Missouri governor Jay Nixon, and Michigan governor Rick Snyder declared a state of emergency, with Snyder extending the emergency until May 25. The Missouri National Guard was dispatched to the Mississippi River in Clarksville and Dutchtown, and Nixon activated the Missouri State Emergency Operations Plan, providing emergency service via state agencies to coordinate with jurisdictions. Illinois governor Quinn designated 44 counties in Illinois as disaster areas. The Federal Emergency Management Agency declared a federal emergency and a disaster declaration for 46 counties in Illinois. On December 18, 2014, two law enforcement officers from the Missouri State Highway Patrol were honored by the Missouri Department of Public Safety after rescuing two people from flooding.
