= Mary Adams (politician) =

American politician (born 1952)

Member of the North Dakota House of Representatives from the 43rd district
- In office December 1, 2018 – December 1, 2022
- Preceded by: Lois Delmore
- Succeeded by: Eric James Murphy

Personal details
- Born: November 23, 1952 (age 73) Grand Forks, North Dakota, U.S.
- Party: Democratic
- Spouse: Steven

Mary Adams (born 23 November 1952) is an American politician. She is a Democrat who represented District 43 in the North Dakota House of Representatives.

== Biography ==
Adams was born on November 23, 1952. She worked as a realtor at Crary Homes & Real Estate.

In 2018, Adams announced her candidacy for state representative. She and fellow Democrat Matt Eidson won the November general election. She took office on December 1, 2018. Adams lost reelection in the November 2022 general election.

In 2024, Adams ran for state representative in the 18th District in Grand Forks. She finished 3rd with 23.8% of the vote.

In June 2026, Adams was elected to the Grand Forks School board, receiving 13.9% of the vote. In the same primary election, she ran unopposed in the Democratic primary for State Senate in District 43.

Adams is married to Steve. They have two children and reside in Grand Forks, North Dakota.
