= Matt Eidson =

American politician

Member of the North Dakota House of Representatives from the 43rd district
- In office December 1, 2018 – September 30, 2020 Serving with Mary Adams
- Succeeded by: Zac Ista

Personal details
- Party: Democratic
- Education: University of North Dakota

Military service
- Allegiance: United States
- Branch/service: United States Marine Corps
- Years of service: 2008-2015

Matt Eidson is an American author and former politician. He represented District 43 as a Democrat in the North Dakota House of Representatives.

== Personal life ==
Eidson was in the United States Marine Corps from 2008 to 2015, and served in Iraq and Afghanistan. He earned a Bachelor of Arts degree from the University of North Dakota in 2018, as well as a Master of Arts degree in 2021. He is currently pursuing a Master of Fine Arts degree in creative writing from West Virginia University.

== Political career ==
In 2018, Matt Eidson ran for election to one of two District 43 seats in the North Dakota House of Representatives. He and fellow Democrat Mary Adams won, defeating Republicans Ben Olson and incumbent Richard Becker.

During his term, Eidson sat on the following committees:

- Higher Education Interim Committee
- Taxation Interim Committee
- Energy and Natural Resources Standing Committee
- Finance and Taxation Standing Committee

=== Electoral record ===
2018 general election: North Dakota House of Representatives, District 43
Party	Candidate	Votes	%
Democratic	Mary Adams	2,590	28.2%
Democratic	Matt Eidson	2,254	24.5%
Republican	Ben Olson	2,219	24.1%
Republican	Richard Becker	2,113	23.0%
	Other/Write-in	15	0.2%
