= Jon Lindgren =

American politician (born 1939)

32nd Mayor of Fargo, North Dakota
- In office 1978–1994
- Preceded by: Richard A. Hentges
- Succeeded by: Bruce Furness

Personal details
- Born: Jon Gilmore Lindgren; 1939 (age 86–87) Lanyon, Iowa, U.S.
- Education: Iowa State University (BS); University of Missouri (PhD)
- Profession: Politician, advocate, professor

Jon Gilmore Lindgren (born 1939) is an American politician who was the mayor of Fargo, North Dakota, an advocate for LGBT rights, and a professor at North Dakota State University.

== Early life and education ==
Lindgren was born in Lanyon, Iowa, in 1939. He received a B.S. in 1960 from Iowa State University and his Ph.D. from the University of Missouri in 1968. Jon Lindgren was Chair of the Economics Department at North Dakota State University.

== Mayor of Fargo ==
Lindgren served as mayor of Fargo, North Dakota from 1978 until 1994 and was the second longest serving mayor; he was succeeded by Bruce Furness.

Lindgren was staunchly opposed to the 12th Avenue bridge connecting Fargo, North Dakota and Moorhead, Minnesota, before he was elected mayor of Fargo. He did not agree with the findings of the Bridge Company and other organizations. Lindgren did not feel a bridge was necessary and he focused on the impact the bridge would have on residential neighborhoods, the environment, the structure of the bridge, who would pay for its construction, and how feasible the bridge would be economically. Lindgren held some liberal views on LGBT rights and abortion, which caused some controversy within the city.

== Political positions ==
=== LGBT issues ===
Lindgren was possibly the first elected official in North Dakota to express support for gay rights in North Dakota.

The Fargo LGBT community had several popular hangouts in the 1970s, i.e. "The Flame" bar, Roger's Sandwich Shop on Broadway and a Chinese restaurant that became a disco at night. However, no business existed that primarily catered to the gay community.

It was in the early 1980s that a business owner named Lenny Tweeden sought to open a gay bar named "My Place", in the face of significant local opposition. As mayor, Lindgren was supportive of the right for this establishment to exist. Years later, Tweeden said that "My Place" survived for as long as it did, thanks in no small part to Lindgren.

While Lindgren was unable to pass any citywide LGBT civil right bill as mayor, he did issued several official pride proclamations in the 1980s, which were opposed by a majority of the city council, and publicly expressed his support for LGBT rights.

=== Abortion ===
Lindgren was instrumental in helping to keep violence to a minimum during the 1980s - early 1990s, when some advocates were willing to use violence to advance their cause. There were no instances of violence nor any threats of violence. At its height, the Lambs of Christ anti-abortion group, were arrested for what most term civil disobedience for blocking access to the abortion facility by passive means. Many in the group were convicted for the misdemeanors of criminal trespass and preventing arrest as reported in the New York Times.

== Other work ==
Jon is a former president of the Red River Free Thinkers and publishes frequently on their website. Lindgren's blog, Views of a Freethinker is a Featured Areal Voices in Forum Communications Company's newspapers. Since the blog's inception in 2011 it has had over half a million visits.

== See also ==
- Ten Percent Society, LGBT rights group based in North Dakota
- LGBT
- Obed Simon Johnson, an early and pioneering sinologist is the granduncle of Jon Lindgren

Political offices
Preceded by Richard A. Hentges	Mayor of Fargo; 1978–1994	Succeeded by Bruce Furness
