= Bruce Furness =

American politician

33rd Mayor of Fargo
- In office 1994–2006
- Preceded by: Jon Lindgren
- Succeeded by: Dennis Walaker

Bruce Furness is an American politician, the former mayor of Fargo, North Dakota. He served as mayor from 1994 until 2006.

Furness is a former manager at IBM and a bank executive.

Political offices
Preceded by Jon Lindgren	Mayor of Fargo; 1994–2006	Succeeded by Dennis Walaker
