= Zac Ista =

American attorney and politician (born 1985)

Minority Leader of the North Dakota House of Representatives
- Incumbent
- Assumed office April 30, 2023
- Preceded by: Joshua Boschee

Member of the North Dakota House of Representatives from the 43rd district
- Incumbent
- Assumed office October 9, 2020 Serving with Eric James Murphy
- Preceded by: Matt Eidson
- Succeeded by: Lukas Maughan (elect)

Personal details
- Born: Zachary Milo Ista; April 7, 1985 (age 41) West Fargo, North Dakota, U.S.
- Party: Democratic
- Education: North Dakota State University (BA); American University (JD)

Zachary Milo Ista (born April 7, 1985) is an American attorney and politician. An assistant state's attorney for Grand Forks County, he was appointed to the North Dakota House of Representatives in 2020 succeeding Matt Eidson. His 43rd district represents Grand Forks. Ista previously ran for a seat in the state house from the 13th district in 2006, while an undergraduate student at North Dakota State University.

North Dakota House of Representatives
Preceded by Joshua Boschee	Minority Leader of the North Dakota House of Representatives; 2023–present	Incumbent
