= 2022 Fargo mayoral election =

- June 14, 2022; Officially non-partisan
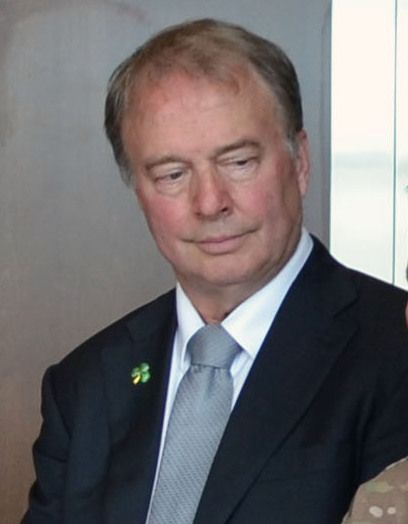

Candidate	Tim Mahoney	Arlette Preston	Shannon Roers Jones
Popular vote	9,755	4,837	3,741
%OAV	40.63%	20.20%	15.62%
%OB	64.65%	32.05%	24.79%
Candidate	Hukun Dabar	Michael E. Borgie	Sheri L. Fercho
Popular vote	2,729	1,353	924
%OAV	11.39%	5.65%	3.86%
%OB	18.09%	8.97%	6.12%
- Precinct results Mahoney: 40–50% 50–60% 60–70% 70–80% 80–90% 90–100% Dabar: 40–50% Tie: 50%
Mayor before election
Tim Mahoney
Elected mayor
Tim Mahoney

The 2022 Fargo mayoral election was held on June 14, 2022. Incumbent mayor Tim Mahoney was re-elected with 40 percent of the approval votes, and was approved of on 64 percent of all ballots. This election was the first mayoral election held in Fargo, North Dakota, after the municipality voted to instate a ballot measure to use approval voting in the city in 2018. It was the first city in the country to implement approval voting, and along with St. Louis, Missouri, is one of two cities to use the system in the United States.

== Results ==
2022 Fargo mayoral election
Candidate	Votes	%OB	%OAV
Tim Mahoney	9,755	64.65%	40.63%
Arlette Preston	4,837	32.05%	20.20%
Shannon Roers Jones	3,741	24.79%	15.62%
Hukun Dabar	2,729	18.09%	11.39%
Michael E. Borgie	1,353	8.97%	5.65%
Sheri L. Fercho	924	6.12%	3.86%
Dustin Thomas Elliott	575	3.81%	2.40%
Write-ins	36	0.24%	0.15%
Total approval votes	23,950	100.00%	100.00%
Ballots cast	15,090	100.00%	100.00%
