= Lukas Maughan =

American politician

Member-elect of the North Dakota House of Representatives from the 43rd district
- Assuming office December 2026
- Succeeding: Zac Ista

Personal details
- Party: Democratic

Lukas Maughan is an American politician. A member of the Democratic Party, he is the member-elect for the 43rd district of the North Dakota House of Representatives.
