= Austin Foss =

American politician

Member of the North Dakota House of Representatives from the 44th district
- Incumbent
- Assumed office December 1, 2024
- Preceded by: Joshua Boschee

Personal details
- Born: 1993 or 1994 (age 32–33) North Dakota, U.S.
- Party: Democratic
- Education: North Dakota State University (BA, MA)

Austin Foss (born 1993/1994 in North Dakota) is an American politician serving as a member of the North Dakota House of Representatives from the 44th district. He is a member of the Democratic-NPL. Foss is an architect.
