= Lois Delmore =

American politician (1949–2026)

Member of the North Dakota House of Representatives from the 43rd district
- In office December 1, 1994 – December 1, 2018
- Succeeded by: Mary Adams

Personal details
- Born: Lois Marie Thompson; April 10, 1949 Maddock, North Dakota, U.S.
- Died: March 18, 2026 (aged 76) Grand Forks, North Dakota, U.S.
- Party: North Dakota Democratic-Nonpartisan League Party
- Occupation: Politician

Lois Marie Delmore (née Thompson; April 10, 1949 – March 18, 2026) was an American politician. She was a member of the North Dakota House of Representatives from the 43rd District and served from 1994 to 2018. Delmore was a member of the Democratic-NPL party. She died in Grand Forks, North Dakota, on March 18, 2026, at the age of 76.
