= Eric James Murphy =

American politician

Member of the North Dakota House of Representatives from the 43rd district
- Incumbent
- Assumed office December 1, 2022 Serving with Zac Ista
- Preceded by: Mary Adams
- Succeeded by: Tyler York (elect)

Personal details
- Party: Republican
- Education: Hastings College B.A., Ohio State University Ph.D.

Eric James Murphy is an American politician and professor. He is serving as a member of the North Dakota House of Representatives from the 43rd district, alongside Zachary Ista. He is a member of the Republican Party.

Murphy works as a professor at the University of North Dakota School of Medicine and Health Sciences. In 2022, he was placed on administrative leave after accusations he violated Title IX protections. He was cleared of any wrongdoing by a judge. The next year, Murphy introduced a bill that would criminalize false complaints. The bill did not pass.

In 2022, Murphy was elected to the North Dakota House of Representatives, representing the 43rd district.

In 2024, Murphy proposed legalizing abortion on request through the 15th week of pregnancy in the state. The proposal failed 87-6. Murphy was quoted as saying "I might lose an election over this, but would I rather win an election by not doing the right thing?"

In 2026, Murphy ran for reelection in District 43. Because of his frequent breaks with his party he attracted two primary challengers, Jill Chandler and Mike Holmes. He did not earn the endorsement of the state party or the local District 43 Republicans. In the primary, Murphy finished third with 24.3% of the vote.
