= List of mayors of Fargo, North Dakota =

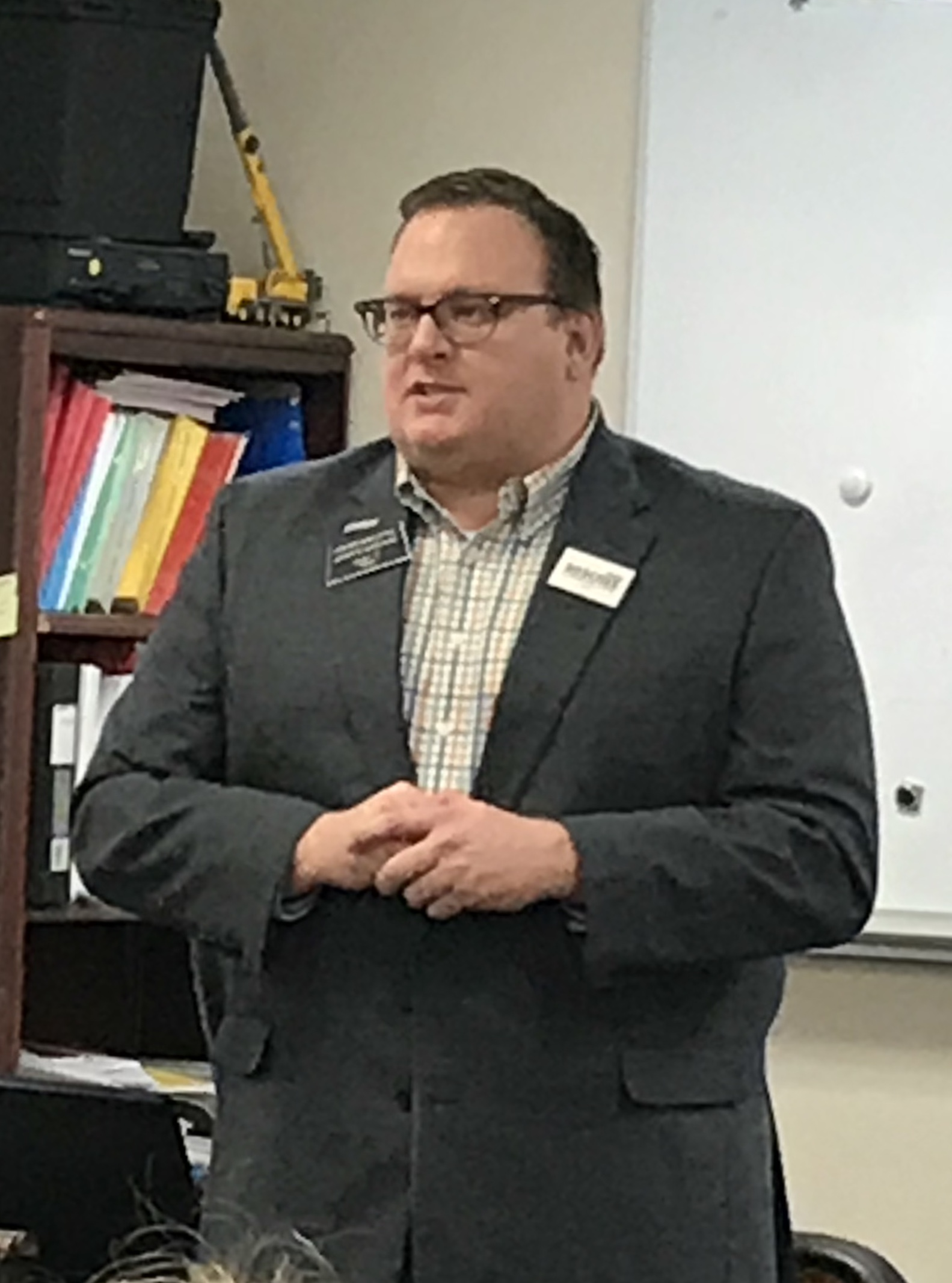
Joshua Boschee was elected mayor of Fargo in 2026.

The following is a complete list of the mayors of Fargo, North Dakota.

No.	Image	Mayor	Term
1		George Egbert (1820–1908)	1875–1876
2		Evan S. Tyler (1843–1923)	1876–1877
3		George Egbert (1820–1908)	1877–1880
4		Jasper B. Chapin (1822–1896)	1880–1882
5		William A. Kindred (c. 1849–1891)	1882–1883
6		Woodford A. Yerxa (1856–1935)	1883–1885
7		John A. Johnson (1842–1907)	1885–1886
8		Charles Scott (fl. c. 1850–1887)	1886–1887
9		Alanson W. Edwards (1840–1908)	1887–1888
10		Seth Newman (1836–1906)	1888–1890
11		Wilbur F. Ball	1890–1892
12		Emerson H. Smith	1892–1894
13		Wilbur F. Ball	1894–1896
14		John A. Johnson (1842–1907)	1896–1902
15		William D. Sweet	1902–1904
16		Aurelius L. Wall	1904–1906
17		John A. Johnson (1842–1907)	1906–1907
18		Peter Elliott	1907–1910
19		Vernon R. Lovell	1910–1912
20		William D. Smith	1912–1913
21		Henry F. Emery	1913–1917
22		Alex Stern	1917–1921
23		Hamilton W. Geary	1921–1925
24		John H. Dahl	1925–1929
25		Alf T. Lynner	1929–1933
26		Fred O. Olsen	1933–1946
27		Charles A. Dawson	1946–1950
28		Murray A. Baldwin	1950–1954
29		Herschel Lashkowitz	1954–1974
30		Richard A. Hentges	1974–1978
31		Jon Lindgren	1978–1994
32		Bruce Furness	1994–2006
33		Dennis Walaker (1941–2014)	2006–2014 (died in office)
–		Tim Mahoney Acting	2014–2015
34		Tim Mahoney	2015–2026
35		Joshua Boschee	2026–present

== See also ==
- Timeline of Fargo, North Dakota
