= LGBTQ rights in North Dakota =

- North Dakota (US)
- Legal status: Legal since 1973
- Gender identity: Transgender people allowed to change legal gender after sex reassignment surgery
- Discrimination protections: Protections in employment for sexual orientation and gender identity

Family rights
- Recognition of relationships: Same-sex marriage since 2015
- Adoption: Same-sex couples allowed to adopt

Lesbian, gay, bisexual, transgender, and queer (LGBTQ) people in the U.S. state of North Dakota may face some legal challenges not experienced by non-LGBTQ residents. Same-sex sexual activity is legal in North Dakota, and same-sex couples and families headed by same-sex couples are eligible for all of the protections available to opposite-sex married couples; same-sex marriage has been legal since June 2015 as a result of Obergefell v. Hodges. State statutes do not address discrimination on account of sexual orientation or gender identity; however, the U.S. Supreme Court's ruling in Bostock v. Clayton County established that employment discrimination against LGBTQ people is illegal under federal law.

== Laws regarding same-sex sexual activity ==
Prior to European settlement in the 18th and 19th centuries, there were no known legal or social punishments for engaging in homosexual activity. Perceptions toward gender and sexuality within Native American tribes both were and still are different than those of people from European descent. Several tribes have traditions of "third gender" people (also called "two-spirit") who perform tasks and wear clothes within the tribe that outsiders may consider to be gender non-conforming or incongruous with their primary or secondary sex characteristics. Among the Arikara, "male-bodied" people who "act as women" are known as skuxát. Likewise, the Hidatsa and the Mandan refer to them as miati and mihdeke, respectively, while they are known as wįktą, winkta and wíŋkte (or winkte) among the Assiniboine, the Dakota and the Lakota.

The first criminal law against sodomy in North Dakota was enacted in 1862, then the Dakota Territory. It prohibited heterosexual and homosexual fellatio. The law was expanded in 1885 to include anal intercourse. The state's vagrancy laws were expanded in 1903 to cover anyone whose speech or conduct was deemed to be "lewd, wanton and lascivious". In State v. Nelson (1917), the North Dakota Supreme Court broadened the scope of the sodomy law to include acts of cunnilingus.

In 1927, a law initially designed to permit the sterilization of mentally and physically disabled inmates was expanded to include anyone who state authorities believed might be "habitual criminals, moral degenerates and sexual perverts". The forced sterilization law was repealed in 1965.

In 1973, the state legalized private, adult, consensual homosexual relations as part of a larger revision of the Criminal Code that set the universal age of consent at eighteen years.

== Recognition of same-sex relationships ==
Same-sex marriage has been legal in North Dakota since the U.S. Supreme Court decision in Obergefell v. Hodges on June 26, 2015, which found the denial of marriage rights to same-sex couples unconstitutional. The state had previously restricted marriage to the union of one man and one woman and denied recognition to same-sex unions under any legal designation both in its Constitution and by statute.

A lawsuit challenging the state's refusal to license and recognize same-sex marriages, Ramsay v. Dalrymple, was initiated in June 2014, but proceedings were suspended in January 2015 pending action by the U.S. Supreme Court in related cases.

In August 2020, the Turtle Mountain Band of Chippewa Indians legalized same-sex marriage within its reservation by a vote of 6–2; the first Native American tribal jurisdiction in North Dakota to do so.

== Adoption and parenting ==
North Dakota permits adoption by individuals and state law does not expressly ban LGBTQ people or same-sex couples from adopting or having custody of children. However, in the 1980s, the North Dakota Supreme Court ruled that because of societal prejudices, the sexual orientation of a parent would be the deciding factor in child custody cases. This ruling was subsequently reversed in 2003.

North Dakota law expressly allows private adoption organizations in the state to discriminate against LGBT individuals or couples seeking to adopt children, if such discrimination is based on a sincerely held religious belief.

Lesbian couples have access to assisted reproduction services, such as in vitro fertilization. State law recognizes the non-genetic, non-gestational mother as a legal parent to a child born via donor insemination, irrespective of the marital status of the parents. In addition, North Dakota law explicitly permits gestational surrogacy. This statute also declares that a child born to a gestational surrogate is the child of the intended parents, whether same-sex or different-sex, for all intents and purposes. Traditional surrogacy is prohibited regardless of sexual orientation.

== Discrimination protections ==
Map of North Dakota cities that had sexual orientation and/or gender identity anti–employment discrimination ordinances prior to Bostock Sexual orientation and gender identity solely in public employment Sexual orientation in public employment Does not protect sexual orientation and gender identity in employment¹ ¹Since 2020 as a result of Bostock, discrimination on account of sexual orientation or gender identity in public and private employment is outlawed throughout the state.

North Dakota statutes do not explicitly address discrimination on the basis of sexual orientation or gender identity.

Since 2001, the city of Fargo has had a non-discrimination policy that includes sexual orientation, but it only applies to city employees. A similar policy exists in Jamestown. The Human Rights Campaign added Bismarck and Mandan to this list in 2016 under its annual "Municipal Equality Index", though removed them in later versions of the index.

On June 17, 2013, the Grand Forks City Council approved a measure to protect city employees and city job applicants from discrimination based on gender identity and sexual orientation, becoming the second city in North Dakota to do so, and the first to address gender identity-based discrimination. Later that year, the city became the first in North Dakota to ban discrimination in rental housing based on sexual orientation or gender identity.

On February 17, 2015, the North Dakota Senate voted 25–22 to approve a bill that would have banned discrimination on the basis of sexual orientation or gender identity in employment, housing and public accommodations. The bill did not receive enough votes to pass in the House of Representatives.

In April 2021, Governor Doug Burgum signed a bill into law allowing student groups at colleges, universities and high schools to discriminate against LGBT students. Many public colleges and universities have policies requiring students organizations receiving financial support from the institution not to discriminate against students based on race, sex, religion, sexual orientation or gender identity. These policies were upheld as constitutional by the Supreme Court of the United States in 2010 in Christian Legal Society v. Martinez.

In March 2023, a bill formally passed the North Dakota Legislature to legally allow businesses to "refuse service on any grounds whatsoever" - based upon religious objective alone by an individual. The Governor of North Dakota is yet to either sign or veto the bill.

=== Bostock v. Clayton County ===
On June 15, 2020, the U.S. Supreme Court ruled in Bostock v. Clayton County, consolidated with Altitude Express, Inc. v. Zarda, and in R.G. & G.R. Harris Funeral Homes Inc. v. Equal Employment Opportunity Commission that discrimination in the workplace on the basis of sexual orientation or gender identity is discrimination on the basis of sex, and Title VII therefore protects LGBT employees from discrimination.

== Hate crime law ==
North Dakota law does not address hate crimes based on gender identity or sexual orientation.

North Dakota does have a law that addresses hate or bias based crimes, but it does not address sexual orientation or gender identity. The Federal Hate Crimes Statistics Act of 1990 encouraged states to report hate crime data to the FBI. Fargo is the city responsible for reporting hate crimes to the state and federal governments. Studies have shown that 2 in 3 hate crimes go unreported. This small knowledge of hate crimes may contribute to the lack of legislation in support of the LGBT community. Groups like the Human Rights Campaign, along with other organizations, are currently working with North Dakota law officials in order to modify the hate crime laws to be LGBT-inclusive.

Although North Dakota's hate crime law does not protect LGBTQ people, U.S. federal law has addressed the categories of sexual orientation and gender identity since 2009, when the Matthew Shepard and James Byrd Jr. Hate Crimes Prevention Act was signed into law by President Barack Obama. Hate crimes committed on the basis of the victim's sexual orientation or gender identity can be prosecuted in federal court.

== Transgender rights ==
=== Identity documents ===
In May 2023, a bill passed the North Dakota Legislature restricting gender changes on birth certificates to cases where a person underwent surgery for "anatomically correct genitalia." However, the law has had little effect, as the accompanying regulations were rejected by the legislature, leaving in place a 2008 regulation that restricted gender changes to those who have "undergone a sex conversion operation."

The Department of Transportation will update the gender marker on a driver's license and state ID card upon receipt of a letter signed by a physician or therapist stating that the applicant has completed a "gender role transition" that "is permanent."

=== Gender-affirming care for minors ===
It is illegal to provide gender-affirming care to minors. On April 5, 2023, the state legislature passed a bill by a veto-proof majority.

=== Sports ===
In 2021, the North Dakota Legislature passed legislation to ban transgender girls from participating in girls school sport teams. The bill passed the House by a vote of 69–25 and the Senate by a vote 27–20. The Governor of North Dakota, Doug Burgum, vetoed the bill on April 21, 2021. Overriding the governor's veto would require a two-thirds majority in both chambers.

In April 2023, a pair of bills passed the state legislature and were signed into law by the Governor. These bills legally ban transgender individuals assigned male at birth from playing on female sports and athletics within North Dakota schools and higher education respectively.

=== Pronouns ===
In March 2023, a bill passed the North Dakota Legislature that would have banned the use of preferred gender pronouns for trans people within all state-run schools and classrooms without explicit approval of the student's parent or guardian and school administration. The Governor of North Dakota formally vetoed the bill. Another bill in May with amendments attached (via committee) was passed by the Legislature and signed into law by the Governor. This bill forbids schools and government entities from requiring (or prohibiting) the use of preferred pronouns. It also requires the disclosure and outing of transgender students to their parents within state-run schools. It went into effect July 1.

=== Bathroom bans ===
In April 2023, a pair of bills passed both houses of the North Dakota Legislature and were signed into law by the Governor of North Dakota, Doug Burgum, mandating that transgender individuals' bathroom usage to be restricted in North Dakota state-run schools, college dormitories, and correctional facilities. It went into effect July 1. A bill passed in 2025 additionally restricts schools from designating multi-occupancy bathrooms as gender-neutral.

== Politics ==
In July 2020, the North Dakotan Republican delegates voted in favor of the party's 2020 election platform. The platform opposes absolutely any civil rights protections for LGBTQ people, while accusing transgender people "of preying on women" and LGBTQ people of "recruiting children". Many Republican delegates condemned the platform. Republican Governor Doug Burgum also opposed the anti-gay platform, calling it "divisive and divisional", and saying, "As I've long said, all North Dakotans deserve to be treated equally and live free of discrimination".

Carrie Evans was elected to the Minot City Council in June 2020 and is the first openly lesbian to hold elected office in the state. In 2012, Joshua Boschee became the first openly gay man to be elected to the North Dakota House of Representatives. In 2015, Representative Randy Boehning was outed as bisexual, after having voted against an LGBT rights bill in the House.

== Conversion therapy laws ==
In June 2021, a policy was adopted in committee within North Dakota from a regulation (which does not require legislative approval) - to legally ban conversion therapy by social workers, psychologists and councilors with their clients and/or hosts.

== Public opinion ==
A 2022 Public Religion Research Institute (PRRI) opinion poll found that 66% of North Dakota residents supported same-sex marriage, while 34% opposed it and 1% were unsure. The same poll also found that 78% of North Dakota residents supported an anti-discrimination law covering sexual orientation and gender identity, while 22% were opposed. Additionally, 58% were against allowing businesses to refuse to serve gay and lesbian people due to religious beliefs, while 41% supported allowing such religiously-based refusals.

Public opinion for LGBTQ anti-discrimination laws in North Dakota
Poll source	Date(s) administered	Sample size	Margin of error	% support	% opposition	% no opinion
Public Religion Research Institute	January 2-December 30, 2019	182	?	71%	21%	8%
Public Religion Research Institute	January 3-December 30, 2018	187	?	72%	20%	7%
Public Religion Research Institute	April 5-December 23, 2017	247	?	58%	29%	13%
Public Religion Research Institute	April 29, 2015-January 7, 2016	276	?	60%	36%	4%

== Summary table ==
Same-sex sexual activity legal	Yes (Since 1973)
Equal age of consent	Yes
Anti-discrimination laws for sexual orientation	Yes (In employment AND housing and public accommodations since harm date of June 15, 2020 (in adherence to the Bostock Decision), as determined by North Dakota Department of Labor and Human Rights)
Anti-discrimination laws for gender identity or expression	Yes (In employment AND housing and public accommodations since harm date of June 15, 2020 (in adherence to the Bostock Decision), as determined by North Dakota Department of Labor and Human Rights)
Same-sex marriages	Yes (Since 2015)
Stepchild and joint adoption by same-sex couples	Yes
Lesbian, gay and bisexual people allowed to serve openly in the military	Yes (Since 2011)
Transgender people allowed to serve openly in the military	(Banned since 2025 via Executive Order and SCOTUS decision)
Intersex people allowed to serve openly in the military	(Current DoD policy bans "hermaphrodites" from serving or enlisting in the military)
Right to change legal gender	Yes (Requires sex reassignment surgery)
Gay panic defense abolished	Yes
Conversion therapy banned on minors	No / Yes (Since 2021 - in some circumstances only, such as social workers on their clients)
Access to IVF for lesbian couples	Yes
Surrogacy arrangements legal for gay male couples	Yes (Gestational surrogacy contracts recognized)
MSMs allowed to donate blood	No / Yes (Since 2020; 3-month deferral period)

== See also ==
- LGBT history in North Dakota
