= Queer & Trans Alliance =

LGBT civil rights organization in the US

The Queer & Trans Alliance, formerly known as the Ten Percent Society, is the name of the first gay rights organization in North Dakota created by students and faculty at the University of North Dakota in 1982. The organization gained its original name from a widely held (but false) belief that scientist Alfred Kinsey's research in the 1940s and 1950s had stated that ten percent of the population was gay. While the organization had little early success, it started to foster an increased tolerance for gay people and a more active LGBT rights movement in North Dakota.

== LGBT rights in North Dakota ==
In 1975, the North Dakota State legislature legalized private, adult, consensual and noncommercial homosexuality as part of a larger revision of the criminal code. It was during this decade, that an LGBT community was slowly becoming more visible in Fargo, North Dakota, as well as Grand Forks, North Dakota.

In 1982, University of North Dakota students, faculty and staff formed the "Ten Percent Society" to provide a social network for LGBT people and campaign for LGBT rights. A similar group was formed at North Dakota State University in Fargo.

Today, the Ten Percent Society is still a recognized student organization at the University of North Dakota under the name Queer & Trans Alliance.

== See also ==
- LGBT rights in the United States
- List of LGBT rights organizations
