= Dennis Walaker =

American politician (1941–2014)

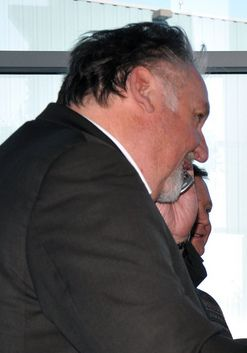

34th Mayor of Fargo
- In office June 28, 2006 – December 2, 2014
- Preceded by: Bruce Furness
- Succeeded by: Tim Mahoney

Personal details
- Born: January 10, 1941 Fargo, North Dakota
- Died: December 2, 2014 (aged 73) Fargo, North Dakota
- Education: North Dakota State University

Dennis Walaker (January 10, 1941 – December 2, 2014) was an American politician who served as 34th mayor of Fargo, North Dakota. He was elected to a four-year term on June 13, 2006, and took office on June 28, 2006. He was re-elected twice during municipal elections held on June 8, 2010, and June 10, 2014. Walaker died in office during his third term as mayor. His deputy mayor, Tim Mahoney, served as mayor for the remainder of Mayor Walaker's final term.

== Biography ==
Walaker was born in Fargo in 1941. He attended Leonard High School in Cass County, North Dakota and North Dakota State University. He worked on the construction of Interstate 94, Interstate 29, and projects within the City of Fargo. Walaker was named City's Public Works Operations Manager in 1989. The scope of the position was later expanded to include emergency management, forestry, and fleet management.

He gained attention (locally and - on a smaller scale - nationally) in April 1997, while coordinating the city's efforts to fight the 1997 Red River flood. After the flooding passed and the city was left mainly dry, Walaker was given some credit for the city's preparations. He gained similar notice for coordinating the response to the 2009 Red River flood, issuing an evacuation order at the height of the flood that included only children and the disabled. Although the city had been urged by state and federal agencies to issue a complete evacuation order, Walaker disagreed, stating that "There's just no way I could tell the people of the city of Fargo, after all the work they'd done, to evacuate." Walaker personally supervised the 2009 efforts in Fargo - described as "orchestrated primarily from inside City Hall" - by local volunteers working with the U.S. Army Corps of Engineers, the Federal Emergency Management Agency, the Coast Guard, and other federal agencies.

Walaker was a member of the Mayors Against Illegal Guns Coalition, a bi-partisan group with a stated goal of "making the public safer by getting illegal guns off the streets." The Coalition was co-chaired by late Boston Mayor Thomas Menino and former New York City Mayor Michael Bloomberg. He was also a member of the Mayors Climate Protection Center, and has been a board member or member of several local, regional, and national organizations, including the Red River Zoo, the Plains Art Museum, the American Public Works Association, the American Water Works Association, the Water Pollution Control Federation, the American Legion, the Sons of Norway, the Hospice of the Red River Valley, and United Way.

Walaker died on December 2, 2014, at the age of 73, from kidney cancer.

Political offices
| Preceded by Bruce Furness | Mayor of Fargo; 2006–2014 | Succeeded by Tim Mahoney |
