= Joshua Boschee =

American politician

Josh Boschee
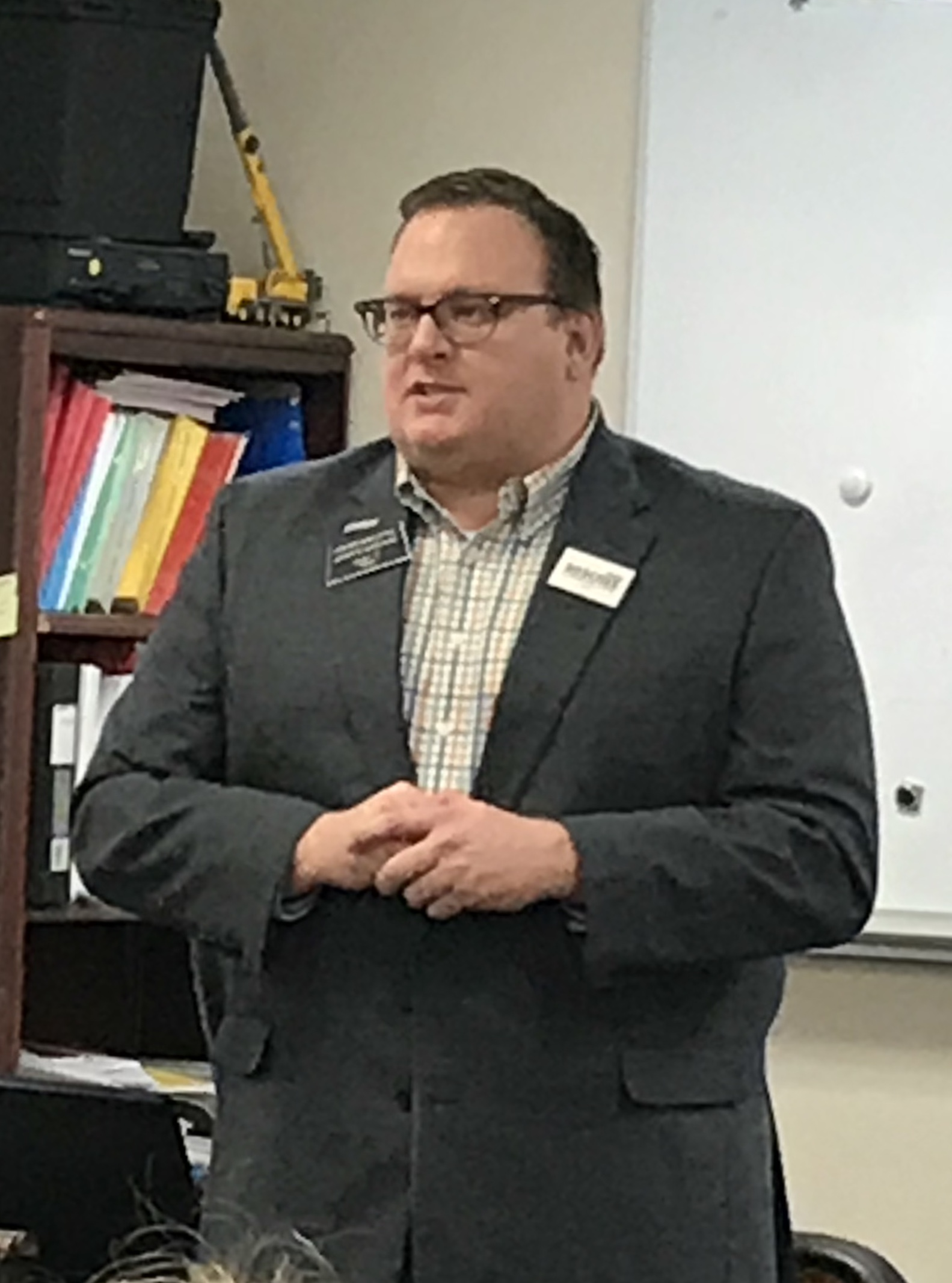

Mayor of Fargo
- Incumbent
- Assumed office July 6, 2026
- Preceded by: Tim Mahoney

Member of the North Dakota Senate from the 44th district
- In office December 1, 2024 – August 4, 2026
- Preceded by: Merrill Piepkorn
- Succeeded by: Jamie Selzler

Minority Leader of the North Dakota House of Representatives
- In office December 3, 2018 – April 30, 2023
- Preceded by: Corey Mock
- Succeeded by: Zac Ista

Member of the North Dakota House of Representatives from the 44th district
- In office December 1, 2012 – December 1, 2024
- Preceded by: Don Clark
- Succeeded by: Austin Foss

Personal details
- Born: May 24, 1982 (age 44) Minot, North Dakota, U.S.
- Party: Democratic
- Education: North Dakota State University (BA, MEd)

Joshua A. Boschee is an American politician who is currently the mayor of Fargo, North Dakota. He previously served in the North Dakota Senate from 2024 to 2026 and the North Dakota House of Representatives from 2012 to 2024. A member of the North Dakota Democratic-NPL Party, he represented the 44th District in the legislature. While in the House he served alongside Karla Rose Hanson in a dual-member district.

He is the first openly gay candidate ever elected to the state legislature in North Dakota. His campaign was opposed by a series of attack ads alleging that he was promoting a "gay agenda," which were revealed to have been funded by Virginia politician and anti-LGBT activist Eugene Delgaudio through his group Public Advocate of the United States.

Originally from Minot, Boschee currently resides in Fargo, and was an employee of Minnesota State University Moorhead at the time of his election.

Boschee declared his candidacy for Mayor of Fargo in January 2026. He was elected mayor on June 9, 2026, defeating five other candidates. Boschee received 46.7% of the vote, nearly twenty points ahead of the Michelle Turnberg, who received the second-highest number of votes. He is the first full-time mayor of the city.

Boschee resigned his senate seat on August 4, 2026, citing the need for a replacement to be appointed for an upcoming special session of the legislature.

Party political offices
| Preceded by April Fairfield | Democratic nominee for Secretary of State of North Dakota; 2018 | Succeeded by Jeffrey Powell |
North Dakota House of Representatives
| Preceded by Corey Mock | Minority Leader of the North Dakota House of Representatives; 2018–2023 | Succeeded by Zac Ista |
Political offices
| Preceded by Tim Mahoney | Mayor of Fargo; 2026–present | Incumbent |
