= Tim Mahoney (North Dakota politician) =

Mayor of Fargo, North Dakota

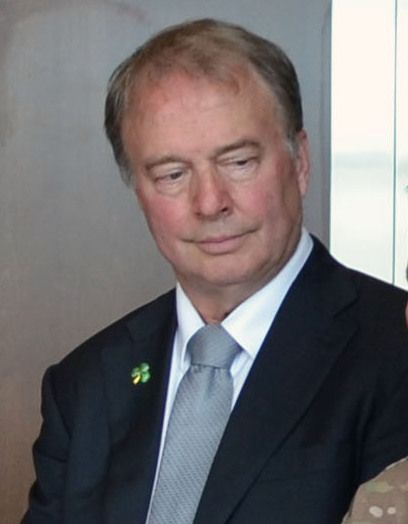

35th Mayor of Fargo
- In office December 2, 2014 – July 6, 2026; Acting: December 2, 2014 – April 29, 2015
- Preceded by: Dennis Walaker
- Succeeded by: Josh Boschee

Personal details
- Born: 1949 or 1950 (age 76–77) Devils Lake, North Dakota, U.S.
- Party: Democratic
- Spouse: Kathy Mahoney
- Children: 4
- Education: University of Notre Dame (BA); Tufts University (MD); Harvard University (MHA)

Timothy Mahoney (born 1949/1950) is an American politician and physician who served as the 35th mayor of Fargo, North Dakota. Having been appointed deputy mayor by Mayor Dennis Walaker in 2006, Mahoney took the role of acting mayor on December 2, 2014, when Walaker died in office. He won a special election for the balance of Walaker's second term on April 28, 2015. He was unopposed for a full term on June 12, 2018, before being re-elected in 2022. He is a member of the Democratic-Non Partisan League Party.

Political offices
Preceded by Dennis Walaker	Mayor of Fargo; 2014–2026; Acting: 2014–2015	Succeeded by Josh Boschee
