= Bahl =

Bahl, also spelled Behl, is an Indian (Khatri) surname. It is also a German surname of unrelated origin.

Notable people and characters with the name include:

== People ==
- Abhinav Behl, NYU Dental Student
- Amit Behl, Indian actor
- Arhaan Behll, Indian actor
- Benoy K. Behl, Indian documentary filmmaker, art historian and photographer
- Camille Bahl (born 1999), French gymnast
- Gayatri Patel Bahl (born 1987), Indian Bollywood actress
- Goldie Behl, Indian filmmaker
- Hansraj Behl (1916–1984), Indian music composer
- Jitin Bahl (born 1975), English cricketer
- Jordy Bahl, American softball player
- Kali Charan Bahl, Indian linguist, University of Chicago professor emeritus
- Kanu Behl, Indian director and screenwriter
- Karm Narayan Bahl (1891–1954), Indian zoologist
- Kevin Bahl (born 2000), Canadian ice hockey player
- Kunal Bahl, Indian e-commerce entrepreneur
- Lalit Behl (1949–2021), Indian actor, director, producer and writer
- Landon Bahl, American politician
- Mohnish Bahl, Indian film and television actor
- Navnindra Behl, Indian actor and director
- Nutan Behl (1936–1991), Indian actress
- Om P. Bahl (1927–2004), Indian–American molecular biologist
- Peter Behl, German wrestler
- Pranutan Bahl, Indian actress
- Puneet Kumar Bahl, Indian Navy admiral
- Raghav Bahl, Indian businessman and owner of TV channels
- Rajiv Bahl, Indian doctor
- Ramesh Behl (?–1990), Indian director and producer
- Ravi Behl, Indian actor and producer
- Rishi Kumar Behl, Indian scientist, professor and author
- Sangeeta Sindhi Bahl, Indian mountaineer
- Siddhant Behl, Indian actor, writer and theatre artist
- Taylor Behl (1987–2005), American college student and murder victim
- Victor Bahl, American computer scientist
- Vickram Bahl (born 1964), Indian television personality
- Vikas Bahl, Indian film producer and director

== Fictional characters ==
- Ricky Bahl, from the 2011 Indian film Ladies vs Ricky Bahl
- Saanvi Bahl, from the 2018 TV show Manifest
