= Jitin (disambiguation) =

The Jitin is a river in Romania.

Jitin may also refer to:

== People ==
- Jitin Prasada
- Jitin Puthenchery
- Jitin Singh
- Jitin Bahl
