= Reed Johnson (politician) =

American politician

Member-elect of the North Dakota House of Representatives from the 17th district
- Assuming office December 2026
- Succeeding: Landon Bahl

Personal details
- Party: Republican

Reed Johnson is an American politician. A member of the Republican Party, he is the member-elect for the 17th district of the North Dakota House of Representatives.
