= Bhagatrav =

- भगत्रव (Sanskrit)
- Location within Gujarat Location within India
- 21°33′55″N 72°45′25″E
- Type: Settlement
- Cultures: Indus Valley Civilization
- Location: Hansot, Bharuch district, Gujarat, India

Bhagatrav (Sanskrit: भगत्रव) is a minor archaeological site belonging to the Indus Valley Civilization. Excavated by the Archaeological Survey of India led by Dr. S. R. Rao, Bhagatrav is located in Hansot (51 km away from Surat) taluka of Bharuch district in south Gujarat, near the coastline with the Arabian Sea, and gives access to the agate-bearing mines and forested hills of the valleys of the rivers Narmada and Tapti.

== Port ==
Bhagatrav seems to have been an important port, as Lothal. However, backwaters of sea and floods from Kim river has washed out the site to a large extent and only peripheral area is left for exploration and for eight months in a year, the site is surrounded by water.

The number of lead pieces, many earth samples with rich iron contents, stone beads, evidences of production of glazed ware (pottery) are found. It may have been a trading port contemporary to Lothal.

== Significance ==
It is observed that flood was one of the reasons for decline/destruction of some Harappan settlements such as Bhagatrav, Lothal, Rangpur, Desalpur, Chanhu-daro etc.

This is one of southernmost Harappan settlements and the distance between Manda, Jammu (one of northernmost Harappan settlement located in Jammu and Kashmir) and Bhagatrav is about 1350 km.

== See also ==
- List of Indus Valley Civilization sites
