= Benoy K. Behl =

Indian documentary filmmaker

Benoy K. Behl is an Indian documentary filmmaker, art historian and photographer known for his work in documenting the art heritage of India and Asia. He has taken more than 50,000 photographs of Asian monuments and has produced more than 140 documentaries which are regularly screened at major cultural institutions worldwide.

== Early life and education ==
Benoy K. Behl, from a Punjabi background, was born in New Delhi on 10 September 1956 and has a B.A. (Honours in English) degree from the University of Delhi (1973–76).

== Photography and documentaries ==
Behl has photographed several historic monuments and ancient art works in both India and abroad, and is considered an authority on Buddhist and Indian art history. His photographs of ancient Buddhist paintings of India, Badami cave temples, Lepakshi Temple, Brahadeeshwara Temple, Ellora Caves, Bagh Caves etc. have featured in international magazines like National Geographic. He has photographed paintings of Ajanta Caves without using flash and exhibited more than 1000 of such photographs in several places, including overseas locations, including Malaysia.

=== Documentary films ===
Behl's first two documentary films, made in 1976, were telecast by Doordarshan. Some of his other documentary films include Another Look at Khadi (on Gandhi's socio-economic philosophy), First Himalayan Car Rally, The Sculpture of India, The Paintings of India, and Divine Marriage. The Sculpture of India, which was first telecast by Dooradarshan, presents the development of Indian sculpture starting from the Indus Valley Civilisation to the 17th century.

A series of documentary films shot by Behl showcasing India's heritage, with a focus on remote and inaccessible places, were shown at India International Centre, New Delhi in August 2009. This two-day film show, titled The Journey Within, was inaugurated by the Government of India's Information and Broadcasting Minister. He has also produced a series of documentaries called Spectacular India, which covers historical monuments, including Kashmir, Leh, and Kangra.

As of 2011, Behl has taken over 35,000 photographs and made more than 100 documentaries.

He has made a critically acclaimed film, focusing on Guru Padmasambhava, which has been screened in many forums.

In 2014, Behl, in collaboration with his friend Rahul Bansal, made a landmark documentary film on yoga, Yoga – An Ancient Vision of Life. The film, shot in several locations, including India, Germany, and the US, also features the last interview with the reputed yoga guru, BKS Iyengar.

==== Indian Roots of Tibetan Buddhism ====
A film made by Behl for the Government of India's Ministry of External Affairs has extensive interviews with the Dalai Lama. The film has won several International Film Festival Awards, including at the prestigious Madrid International Film Festival.

Press reports about the acclaimed film are on the links below.

==== Series of films on 'Spectacular India' ====
The Hindu newspaper states: "Art historian and filmmaker Benoy K Behl has completed shooting and documentation of the culture of the six North-Eastern states and West Bengal for his series on Doordarshan titled 'Spectacular India'. The 52-film series also showcases the tribal dances of the North-East states."

These 52 films discuss the Kashmir Valley, Kanyakumari, Tripura, and the coast of Maharashtra, among others.

==== Doordarshan's series of 26 films: The Paintings of India by Benoy K Behl ====
As Anandajoti posted on Dharma Documentaries, "Benoy Behl is one of the great art historians of India, and I have shown his films on Buddhist art on another post; and also his articles on Indian art.

"Last year I was fortunate enough to be given six DVDs containing his whole series of 26 films on the subject of the Paintings of India, which was broadcast in 2005, and it took me nearly six months to savour them all."

Doordarshan's series, The Paintings of India, is the first major work which connects the tradition of paintings from the time of Ajanta to the present day. The films show many sites of paintings which have never been clearly photographed before.

An archive of over 2500 selected works of Indian miniature paintings has been created in this series. Prominent paintings from the reserve collections and galleries of the top museums and private collections all over the world have been filmed.

==== Doordarshan's The Sculpture of India by Benoy K Behl ====
This series of 26 films produced for Doordarshan presents the tradition of Indian sculpture spanning 5,000 years, from the Indus Valley Civilization to the 17th century.

These films trace the development of philosophic concepts, themes, the creation of deities, of temples and of bronze images which come out of their shrines and even the temples. These are understood in the light of the highly developed Indian tradition of aesthetics and the guidelines suggested in the Chitrasutra of the Vishnudharmottara Purana, the oldest known treatise on the making of artistic images.

The films also explore the traditions of patronage which prevailed and developed over the centuries in the Indian subcontinent. The fundamental role of art in Indic life and philosophy is explored and presented. We see how styles are born and shaped by movements and directions taken by philosophic streams.

The films have been shot extensively in India, from Kanyakumari to Kashmir and from Tripura to Gujarat. The 26 films present an overview of the tradition, including many monuments which are not often visited, such as the Pilak stupa in Tripura and the Charang monastery in an upper part of Kinnaur.

Scores of museums all over India and in Europe and USA have cooperated for this shooting and large numbers of selected masterpieces have been shot. (subscription required)

=== Buddhist art ===
Behl has extensively photographed Buddhist art and sculptures in India as well as in Afghanistan, Siberia, China, Tibet, Japan, Bhutan, Sri Lanka, Mongolia etc. etc. After documenting Bamiyan Buddhas in Afghanistan, he also visited Uzbekistan and Kalmykia Province of Russia to trace the 400-year-old Buddhist tradition in Europe.

=== Prehistoric art ===
Benoy K.Behl has also photographed Indus Valley Civilisation sites like Lothal, Dholavira as a part of documenting Indus Valley Art for his films.

=== Ajanta paintings ===
Hundreds of Ajanta paintings are photographed using low light photography technique by him and Benoy K. Behl is recognised as the first notable photographer to use zero light photography at Ajanta and photographs of the colour paintings of Ajantha are exhibited by Benoy K. Behl at several places.

== Yoga ==
Behl is an ambassador of yoga and tries to spread the knowledge and true meaning of yoga across the world through his documentaries.

== Limca Book of Records ==
The Limca Book of Records, which records achievements in India, has estimated that Behl has crisscrossed across India to an extent of about 1,60,000 km (till 2006) while producing his documentaries on art and sculpture of India.

Behl is also mentioned by Limca Book of Records 2012, as most travelled photographer to document Indian art influences across the world; and to have travelled Nagaland, Assam, Tripura, Spiti, Ladakh etc. to document Buddhist and other art.

Updated record in Limca Book of Records 2015: Benoy is the only person to document Buddhist heritage of 19 regions in 17 countries. He has delivered 349 lectures in 186 major universities/ museums/ cultural institutions in 21 countries around the world. He has made 128 documentary films on Indian art and cultural history. His exhibitions have been held in 253 major cultural institutions in 30 countries. He has taken over 44,000 photographs of monuments and art heritage in India and across the world.

== Exhibitions ==
Photographs taken by Behl are exhibited at several places like Fung Ping Shan Museum, University of Hong Kong (Feb–March 1995), National Museum New Delhi (21 June 2002 to 4 August 2002), Nehru Centre, New Delhi, London, Tokyo, Washington D.C.

His exhibitions are on permanent display at

- Ryukoku University, Kyoto
- Jade Buddha Temple, Shanghai
- Dun Huang Research Institute, Dun Haung
- Shwedagon Pagoda, Myanmar

He has travelled around the world eight times, giving more than 300 lectures in about 170 locations which include Universities, Museums, Institutions all over the world.

== India-Japan Relations ==
Benoy K Behl has done pioneering work on establishing cultural links between India and Japan. His works has been reported in numerous newspapers, including The Times of India. Behl's film on the subject on Indian deities worshipped in Japan can be seen on the YouTube channel of Ministry of External Affairs, Govt. of India.

== Publications ==
- The Art of India, Sculpture and Mural Painting, Ancient and Medieval Period,

The Hindu Group of Publications, 2017 and 2018.

A special publication in two volumes of more than 500 pages from The Hindu Group.

The book presents a vast perspective on the history of Indian art: ranging from the eighth century Sun Temple at Martand in Kashmir, which in its time may have been one of the grandest structural temples standing in India; the trans-Himalayan Buddhist monasteries; the breathtaking architecture of the Ramanathaswami Temple in Rameswaram; the rock-cut Jaina reliefs Kazhugumalai; the glory of the Konark Temples in the east; the Jaina temples in Rajasthan; to the Sun Temple at Modhera in Gujarat, one of the most profusely carved in the subcontinent. A review of the book in Frontline magazine.

A review of the book in The Hindu newspaper.

- The Ajanta caves: Benoy K Behl with a foreword by Milo Cleaveland Beach and a note on the Jataka stories by Sangitika Nigam. Thames & Hudson, London and New York.
- The Ajanta Caves: Ancient Paintings of Buddhist India Benoy K Behl
- Benoy K. Behl has also written features on art history, sculpture, history and related subjects and contributed numerous photographs to various publications like National Geographic, Frontline, Mint, The Hindu etc.

== Positions held ==
Position	Institution/place	period
Visiting Professor	College of Arts, University of Delhi	2009
Consultant	Ministry of Tourism, Govt. of India	
Chairman	Bharatheeya Vidya Bhavan – Buddhist Art	2012
