= Karm Narayan Bahl =

Indian zoologist (1891–1954)

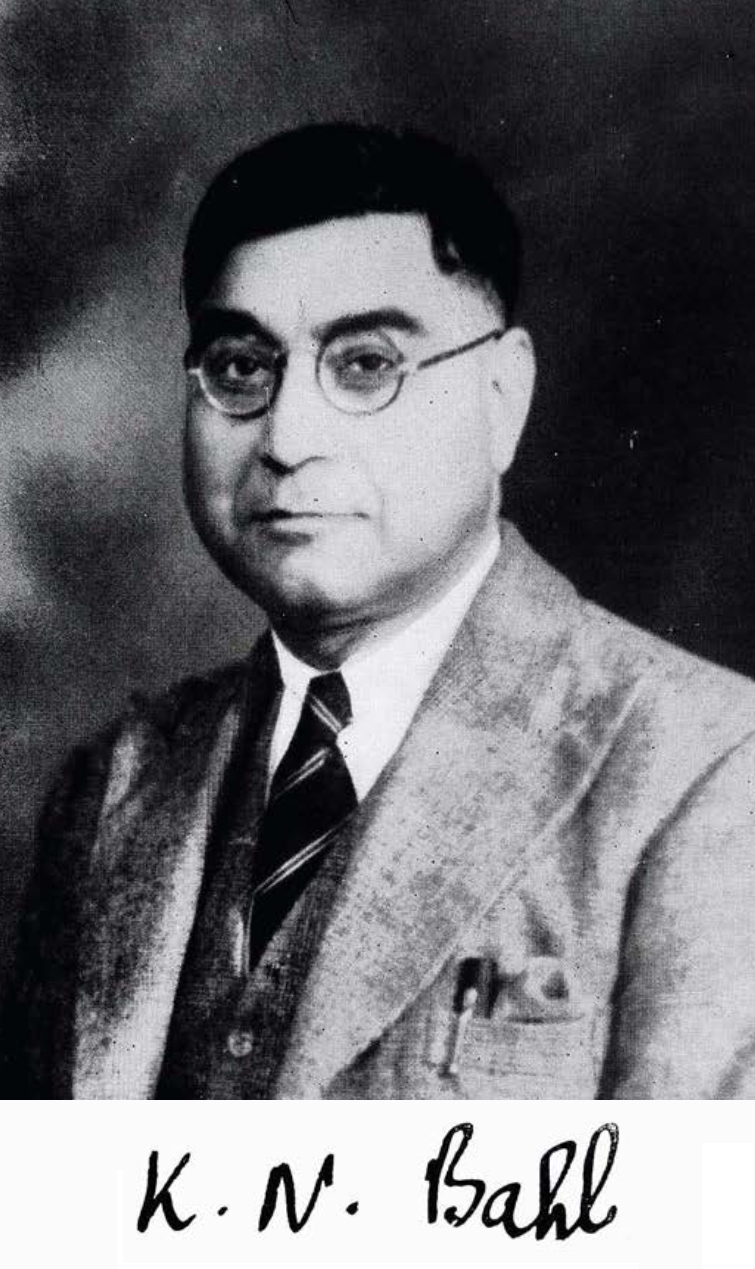
Karm Narayan Bahl

Karm Narayan Bahl (14 February 1891 – 21 April 1954) was an Indian zoologist who studied earthworms, their nephridial morphology, and excretion. He served as a professor of zoology at Lucknow University. He founded a series of memoirs on model animals of Indian origin for the purposes of teaching zoology in India.

== Life and work ==
Bahl was born in Multan and was educated at the Government college in Lahore receiving a master's degree in 1913 with a Maclagan Gold medal. He then joined there as an assistant professor. He then moved to St. John's College, Agra and then to Muir Central College, Allahabad in 1916. A major influence was professor John Stephenson and with his reference spent some time at the Indian Museum in Calcutta. In 1919 he went to Merton College, Oxford University and worked under Edwin Stephen Goodrich, receiving a D.Phil. in 1921 for a thesis entitled The development of the nephridial system in Pheretima, the blood-vascular system in Pheretima, and the gametogenesis in scorpions. He also receive a D.Sc. from Punjab University, Lahore for a thesis on the excretory system of Pheretima in 1920. He returned to India and became head of the department of zoology at Lucknow University. He worked there until his retirement. He then became a vice chancellor of Patna University from 1951 to 1952 and resigned following a nervous breakdown.

Bahl worked for a while on ant-mimic spiders in 1915 and later studied the anatomy of physiology of earthworms, particularly those found commonly around Lucknow such as Pheretima and Eutyphaeus, and founded a series on the monographs of Indian animals called the Indian Zoological Memoirs on Indian Animal Types. Zoology dissections in India at the time were based on organisms that could not be easily found in India. At the Indian Science Congress, Bangalore (1924) he suggested that memoirs along the lines of those produced by the Liverpool Marine Biology Committee edited by Sir William Herdman were desirable. Eight volumes of the monograph were edited by him. He studied Pheretima and classified its nephridia into three types, septal, pharyngeal and integumentary. He classified nephridia that open into the intestine as entero-nephritic and suggested that they had evolved for life away from water and in arid conditions. He published an influential review on Excretion in the Oligochaeta in 1947. He also conducted studies on the common apple snail, Pila globosa and on the skull of monitor lizards of the genus Varanus.

Bahl was a Fellow of the Asiatic Society of Bengal and served on the University Education Commission from 1948 to 1949. The Sri Lankan earthworm Metaphire bahli (originally placed in the genus Pheretima) is named after him.
