= Vickram Bahl =

Indian journalist (born 1964)

Vickram Bahl (born 1964) is a leading Television journalist and commentator in India.

He is currently the Editor in Chief of the Television production News and Features Agency, ITMN, , and has a weekly talk show, Insight - with Vickram Bahl, which is telecast on Doordarshan, , India's National Broadcaster since 2005. This long running weekly show has had Royalty, Heads of States and Governments and leading artists as guests. The other popular programme produced and presented by him is Opportunities Overseas, also telecast on Doordarshan.

He has been presenting on popular television programmes such as Biz Talk, Future Tense, Face to Face and Global Vision on Jain TV, which is among the first Indian private television satellite channels. He has also been presenting the Annual Indian Budget on Jain TV and Sahara TV.

The interview with President Vladimir Putin of Russia in January 2007 had been the only full-length television interview given to Indian TV around his trip to India.
