= Om P. Bahl =

Indian-American molecular biologist and academic (1927–2004)

- Born: 1927; Lyalpur, Punjab, British India
- Died: December 2004 (aged 76–77); United States
- Occupations: Molecular biologist, academic
- Years active: 1962–2004
- Known for: Study of Human chorionic gonadotropin
- Spouse: Nirmal Bahl
- Children: Three children
- Awards: Padma Bhushan; Schoellkopf Medal; Life Science Award

Om Praksh Bahl (1927 – December 2004) was an Indian-American molecular biologist, academic and a Distinguished Professor of the State University of New York. He was known for his studies on Human chorionic gonadotropin, popularly known as the pregnancy hormone. He was associated with the World Health Organization as an adviser to their Population Council and was a member of the Population Research Committee of the National Institutes of Health. The Government of India awarded him the third highest civilian honour of the Padma Bhushan, in 1973, for his contributions to science and engineering.

== Biography ==
O. P. Bahl was born in 1927 in Lyalpur, Punjab Province, British India and did his college studies at Lahore Government College and, later, at Punjab University. He was involved in the Indian independence movement and was the president of the All-India Students Association, a large student organization based in India. Moving to US, he secured his PhD from University of Minnesota in 1962 during which period, he worked as a research associate at General Mills; his tenure at the Mills was reported to have earned him a patent for an innovation on grocery bags. His next move was to University of California, Los Angeles where he did post-doctoral research in biochemistry and molecular biology for one year and continued his research at University of Southern California from 1964 onward. The next year, he joined the university faculty as an assistant professor and worked for one year before joining the University at Buffalo as assistant professor. He became a professor in 1971 and served as the chair at the Department of Biological Sciences during 1976–83.

One of the main contributions of Bahl was on human chorionic gonadotrophin (HCG), commonly known as pregnancy hormone, and his work was reported to have assisted in the development of home pregnancy tests. His researches have been brought out by way of one book, Molecular and Cellular Aspects of Reproduction: Molecular and Cellular Aspects of Reproduction, several text books and articles. He sat in the Population Council of the World Health Organization and in the Population Research Council of the National Institutes of Health as a member. In India, he was involved with promoting transfer of technology as a member of the Committee set up by Rajiv Gandhi, the then Prime Minister of India. He was a Dernham Fellow of the American Cancer Society and was a recipient of their Schoellkopf Medal (1978). He also received the Life Science Award of the Asian Indian Organizations in North America. The Government of India awarded him the civilian honor of the Padma Bhusan in 1973.

Bahl was married to Nirmal and the couple had three children. He died in December 2004, at the age of 87, survived by his wife and children. The University at Buffalo has since instituted a US$1 million endowment, Om P. and Nirmal Bahl Professorship, in the name of Bahl couple, by raising the money through public charity.

== Selected bibliography ==
- K. M. L Agrawal; Om P. Bahl (1968). "Glycosidases of Phaseolus Vulgaris". Journal of Biological Chemistry. 243 (1): 103–111. doi:10.1016/S0021-9258(18)99330-0.
- Swaminathan N, Bahl OP (July 1970). "Dissociation and recombination of the subunits of human chorionic gonadotropin". Biochem Biophys Res Commun. 40 (2): 422–427. doi:10.1016/0006-291x(70)91026-0. PMID 5474793.
- Om P. Bahl; Leopold März; William R. Moyle (1974). "The Role of Carbohydrate in the Biological Function of Human Chorionic Gonadotropin". Hormone Binding and Target Cell Activation in the Testis. Vol. 1. pp. 125–144. doi:10.1007/978-1-4684-2595-6_7. ISBN 978-1-4684-2597-0. PMID 4377982.
- Michael J. Kessler; Molakala S. Reddy; Ramesh H. Shah; Om P. Bahl (1979). "Structures of IV-Glycosidic Carbohydrate Units of Human Chorionic Gonadotropin" (PDF). Journal of Biological Chemistry. 254 (16): 7901–7908. doi:10.1016/S0021-9258(18)36031-9. PMID 468797.
- Om P. Bahl, Premanand V. Wagh (1986). "Characterization of Glycoproteins: Carbohydrate Structures of Glycoprotein Hormones". Molecular and Cellular Aspects of Reproduction. Advances in Experimental Medicine and Biology. Vol. 205. pp. 1–151. doi:10.1007/978-1-4684-5209-9_1. ISBN 978-1-4684-5211-2. PMID 3538813.
- Dharam S. Dhindsa; Om P. Bahl (6 December 2012). Molecular and Cellular Aspects of Reproduction. Springer Science & Business Media. ISBN 978-1-4684-5209-9.

== See also ==
- HCG pregnancy strip test
