= Lothal =

Prominent city of the ancient Indus valley civilization (present-day Gujarat, India)

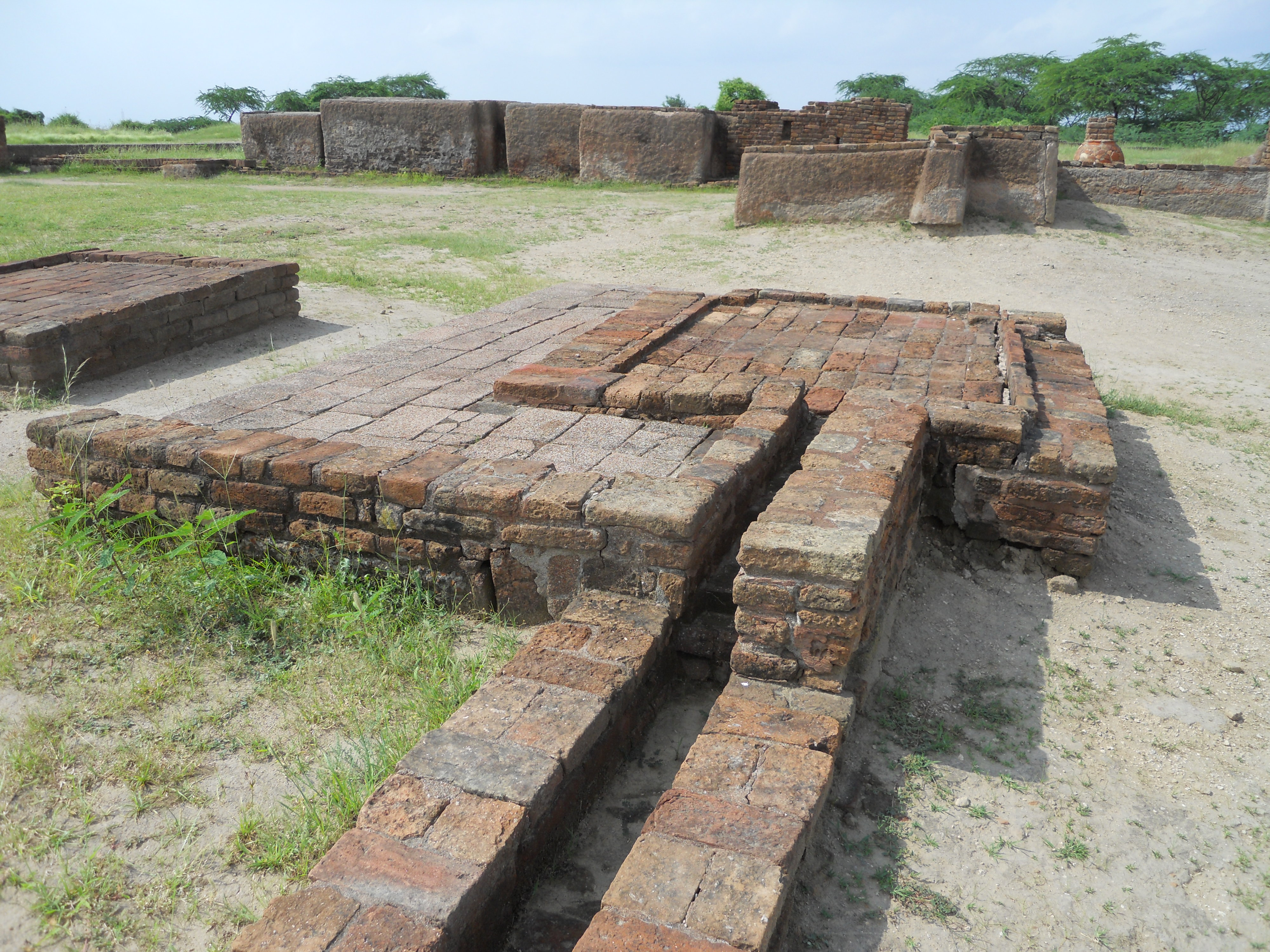
- Archaeological remains of the drainage system, 2012

- Location within Gujarat Location within India Location within South Asia
- 22°31′17″N 72°14′58″E
- Type: Settlement
- Cultures: Indus Valley Civilisation
- Location: Gujarat, India

History
- Built: c. 2300 BC

Site notes
- Area: 7 ha (17 acres)
- Excavation dates: 1955–1960
- Discovered: 1954
- Condition: Ruined
- Owner: Public
- Management: Archaeological Survey of India
- Public access: Yes

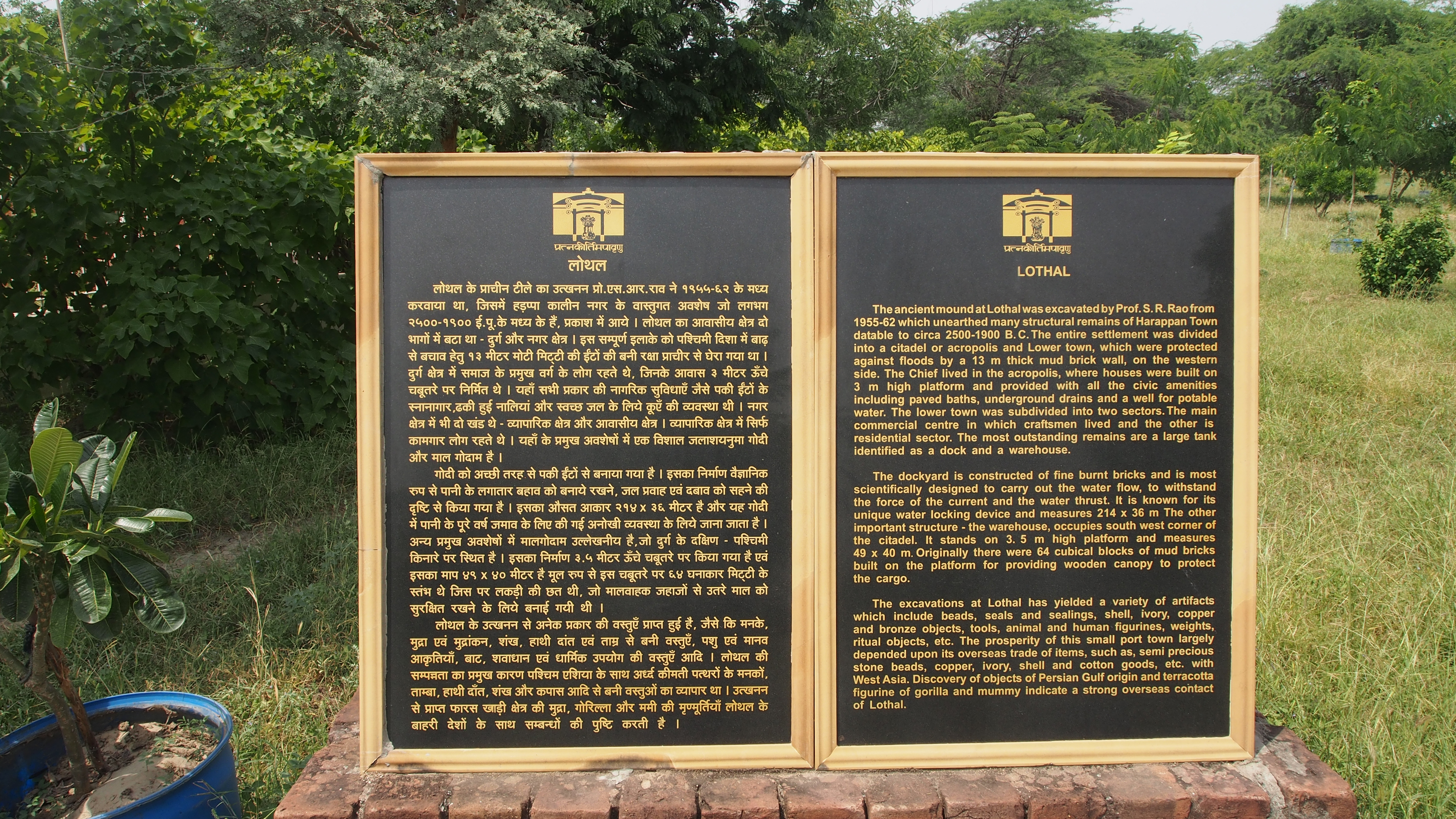
Lothal Archaeological information

Lothal (Gujarati pronunciation: [lot̪ʰəl]) was one of the southernmost sites of the ancient Indus Valley Civilisation, located in the Bhal region of the Indian state of Gujarat. Construction of the city is believed to have begun around 2300 BCE.

== Discovery ==
The Archaeological Survey of India (ASI), the official Indian government agency for the preservation of ancient monuments, discovered Lothal in 1954. Excavation work at Lothal commenced on 13 February 1955 and continued until 19 May 1960.

According to the ASI, Lothal may have had one of the world's earliest known dock, which connected the city to an ancient course of the Sabarmati River on the trade route. This trade route stretched between Harappan cities in Sindh and the Kathiawar Peninsula where the surrounding Kutch desert of today was a part of the Arabian Sea. However, this interpretation has been challenged by other archaeologists, who argue Khufu's Red Sea harbour at Wadi al-Jarf (Egypt) is older, dating its construction to between 2580 and 2550 BCE and that Lothal was a comparatively small town, and that the "dock" was primarily an irrigation tank.

The National Institute of Oceanography in Goa discovered foraminifera (marine microfossils) and salt, gypsum crystals in the rectangular structure clearly indicating that sea water once filled the structure and it was definitely a dockyard.

Lothal was an important trade centre in ancient times, with its trade of beads, gems and valuable ornaments reaching the far corners of West Asia and Africa. The techniques and tools they pioneered for bead-making and in metallurgy have stood the test of time for over 4,000 years.

Lothal is situated near the village of Saragwala in the Dholka Taluka of Ahmedabad district. It is six kilometres southeast of the Lothal–Bhurkhi railway station on the Ahmedabad-Bhavnagar railway line. It is also connected by all-weather roads to the cities of Ahmedabad (85 km/53 mi), Bhavnagar, Rajkot and Dholka. The nearest cities are Dholka and Bagodara. After excavations resumed in 1961, archaeologists unearthed trenches sunk on the northern, eastern and western flanks of the mound, bringing to light the inlet channels and nullah ("ravine", or "gully") connecting the dock with the river. The findings include a mound, a township, a marketplace, and the "dock". Adjacent to the excavated areas stands the Archaeological Museum, where some of the most prominent collections of Harappa-era antiquities in India are displayed.

The Lothal site was nominated, in April 2014, as a UNESCO World Heritage Site, and its application is pending on the tentative list of UNESCO.

== Archaeology ==
Layout of Lothal

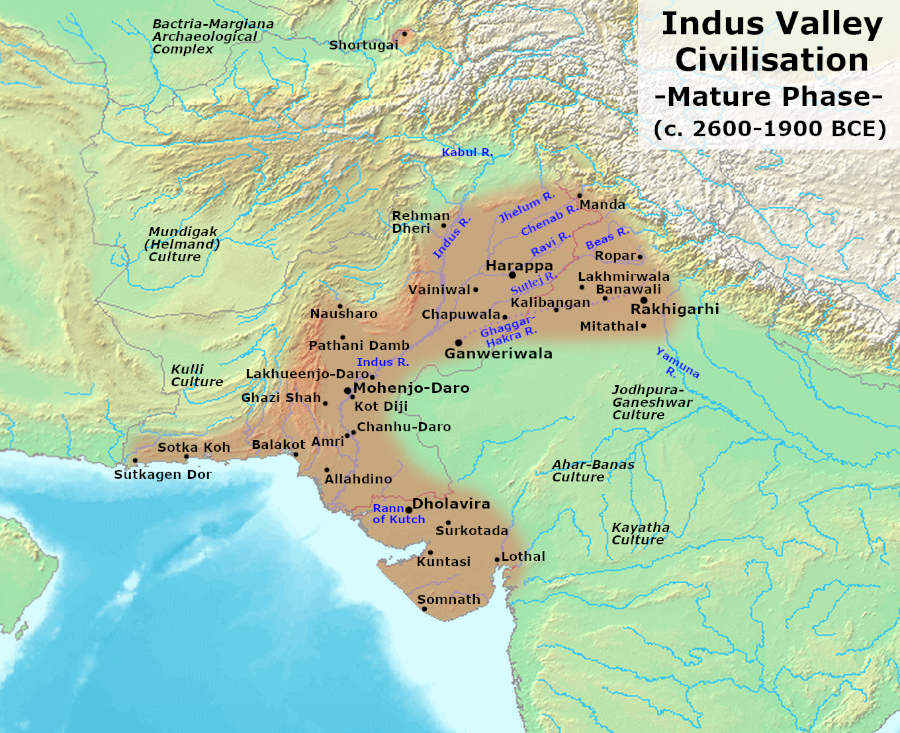
Extent and major sites of the Indus Valley Civilisation

When British India was partitioned in 1947, most Indus sites, including Mohenjo-daro and Harappa, became part of Pakistan. The Archaeological Survey of India undertook a new program of exploration, and excavation. Many sites were discovered across northwestern India. Between 1954 and 1958, more than 50 sites were excavated in the Kutch (notably Dholavira), and Saurashtra peninsulas, extending the limits of Harappan civilisation by 500 kilometres (310 miles) to the river Kim, where the Bhagatrav site accesses the valley of the rivers Narmada and Tapti. Lothal stands 670 kilometers (420 miles) from Mohenjo-daro, which is in Sindh.

The meaning of Lothal (a combination of Loth and (s) thal) in Gujarati is "the mound of the dead". This is not unusual, as the name of the city of Mohenjo-daro in Sindhi translates to the same. People in villages neighbouring to Lothal had known of the presence of an ancient town and human remains. As recently as 1850, boats could sail up to the mound. In 1942, timber was shipped from Broach to Saragwala via the mound. A silted creek connecting modern Bholad with Lothal and Saragwala represents the ancient flow channel of a river or creek.

Speculation suggests that owing to the comparatively small dimensions of the main city (7 hectares (17 acres)), Lothal was not a large settlement at all, and its "dock" was perhaps an irrigation tank. However, the ASI and other contemporary archaeologists assert that the city was a part of a major river system on the trade route of the ancient peoples from Sindh to Saurashtra in Gujarat. Lothal provides with the largest collection of antiquities in the archaeology of modern India. It is essentially a single culture site—the Harappan culture in all its variances is evidenced. An indigenous micaceous Red Ware culture also existed, which is believed to be autochthonous and pre-Harappan. Two sub-periods of Harappan culture are distinguished: the same period (between 2400 and 1900 BCE) is identical to the exuberant culture of Harappa and Mohenjo-daro.

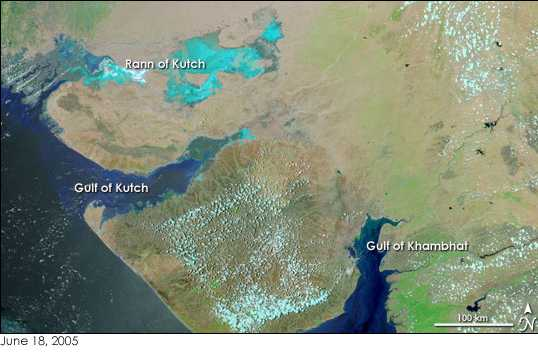
To the northwest of Lothal lies the Kutch (see also Dholavira) peninsula, which was a part of the Arabian Sea until very recently in history. Owing to this, and the proximity of the Gulf of Khambhat, Lothal's river provided direct access to sea routes. Although now sealed off from the sea, Lothal's topography and geology reflects its maritime past.

After the core of the Indus civilisation had decayed in Mohenjo-daro and Harappa, Lothal seems not only to have survived but to have thrived for many years. Its constant threats – tropical storms and floods – caused immense destruction, which destabilised the culture and ultimately caused its end. Topographical analysis also shows signs that at about the time of its demise, the region suffered from aridity or weakened monsoon rainfall. Thus the cause for the abandonment of the city may have been changes in the climate as well as natural disasters, as suggested by environmental magnetic records. Lothal is based upon a mound that was a salt marsh inundated by tide. Remote sensing and topographical studies published by Indian scientists in the Journal of the Indian Geophysicists Union in 2004 revealed an ancient, meandering river adjacent to Lothal, 30 kilometres (19 miles) in length according to satellite imagery— an ancient extension of the northern river channel bed of a tributary of the Bhogavo river. Small channel widths (10–300 m or 33–984 ft) when compared to the lower reaches (1.2–1.6 km or 0.75–0.99 mi) suggest the presence of a strong tidal influence upon the city—tidal waters ingressed up to and beyond the city. Upstream elements of this river provided a suitable source of fresh water for the inhabitants.

== History ==
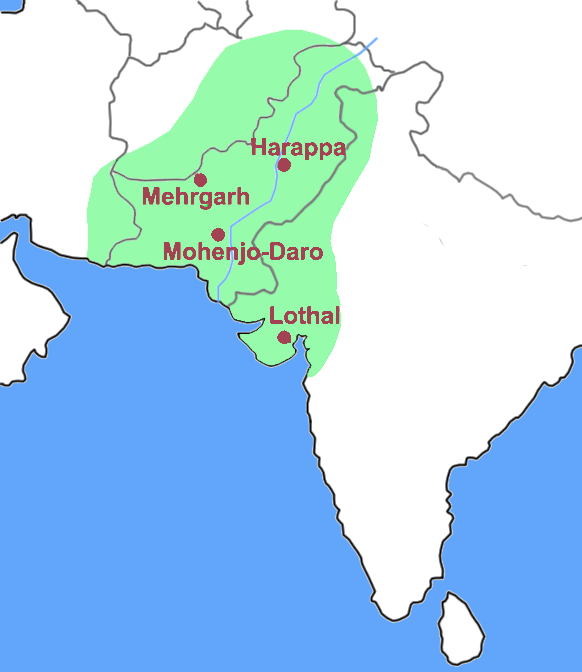
Location of Lothal in the Indus Valley and extent of Indus Valley Civilisation (green)

Before the arrival of Harappan people (c. 3000 BCE), Lothal was a small village next to the river providing access to the mainland from the Gulf of Khambhat. The indigenous people maintained a prosperous economy, attested by the discovery of copper objects, beads and semi-precious stones. Ceramic wares were of fine clay and smooth, micaceous red surface. A new technique of firing pottery under partly oxidising and reducing conditions was improved by them—designated black-and-red ware, to the micaceous Red Ware. Harappans were attracted to Lothal for its sheltered harbour, rich cotton and rice-growing environment and bead-making industry. The beads and gems of Lothal were in great demand in the west. The settlers lived peacefully with the Red Ware people, who adopted their lifestyle, evidenced from the flourishing trade and changing working techniques. Harappans began producing the indigenous ceramic goods, adopting the manner from the natives.

=== Town planning ===
A flood destroyed village foundations and settlements (c. 2350 BCE). Harappans based around Lothal and from Sindh took this opportunity to expand their settlement and create a planned township on the lines of greater cities in the Indus valley. Lothal planners engaged themselves to protect the area from consistent floods. The town was divided into blocks of 1- 2m high (3–6 ft) platforms of sun-dried bricks, each serving 20–30 houses of thick mud and brick walls. The city was divided into a citadel, or acropolis and a lower town. The rulers of the town lived in the acropolis, which featured houses with paved bathing platforms, underground and surface drains (built of kiln-fired bricks) and potable water well. The acropolis also housed the towns warehouse, with a ramp down to the basin, on the towns eastern flank. The lower town was subdivided into two parts. A north–south arterial street was the main commercial area. It was flanked by shops of rich and ordinary merchants and craftsmen. The residential area was located to either side of the marketplace. The lower town was also periodically enlarged during Lothal's years of prosperity.

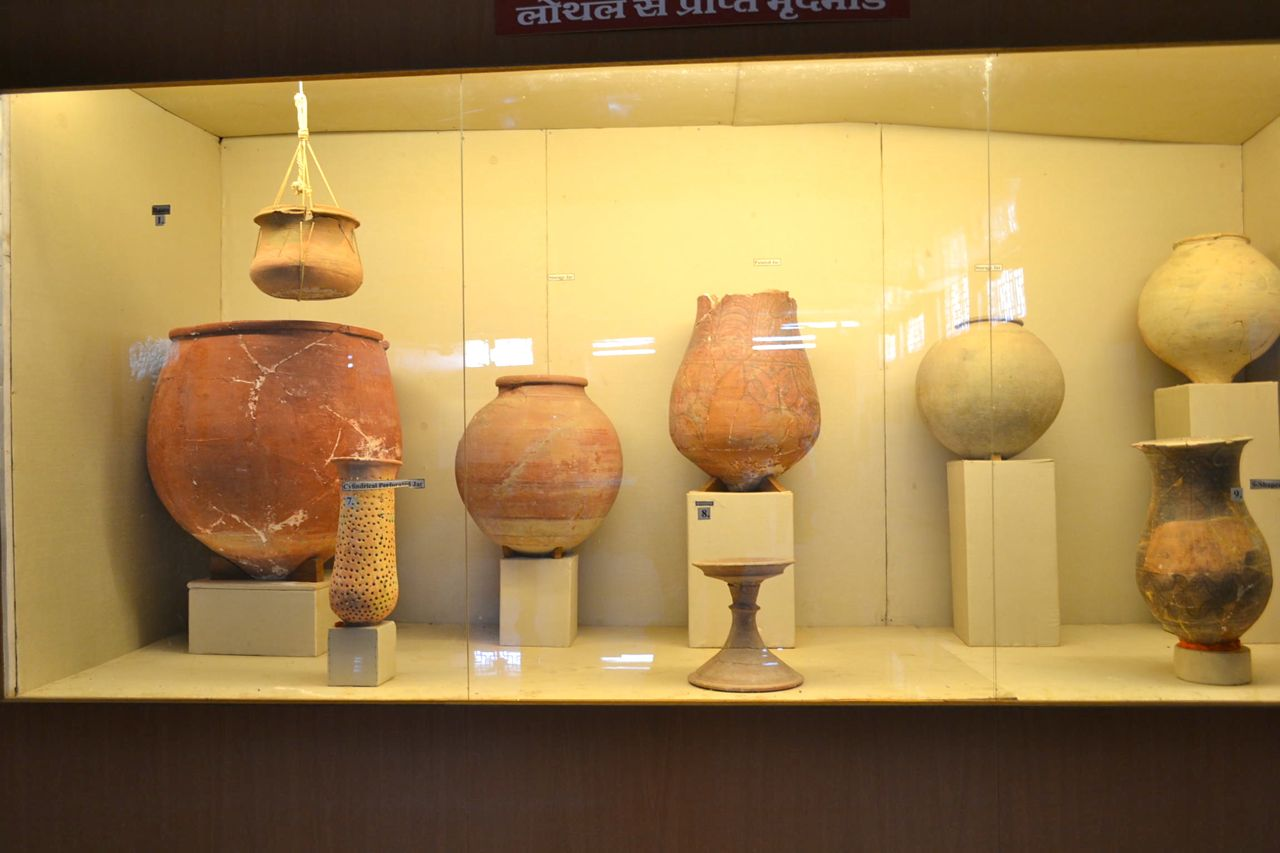
Pottery from Lothal

All the construction were made of fire dried bricks, lime and sand mortar and not by sun-dried bricks as bricks are still intact after 4,000 years and still bonded together with each other with the mortar bond.

=== Economy and urban culture ===
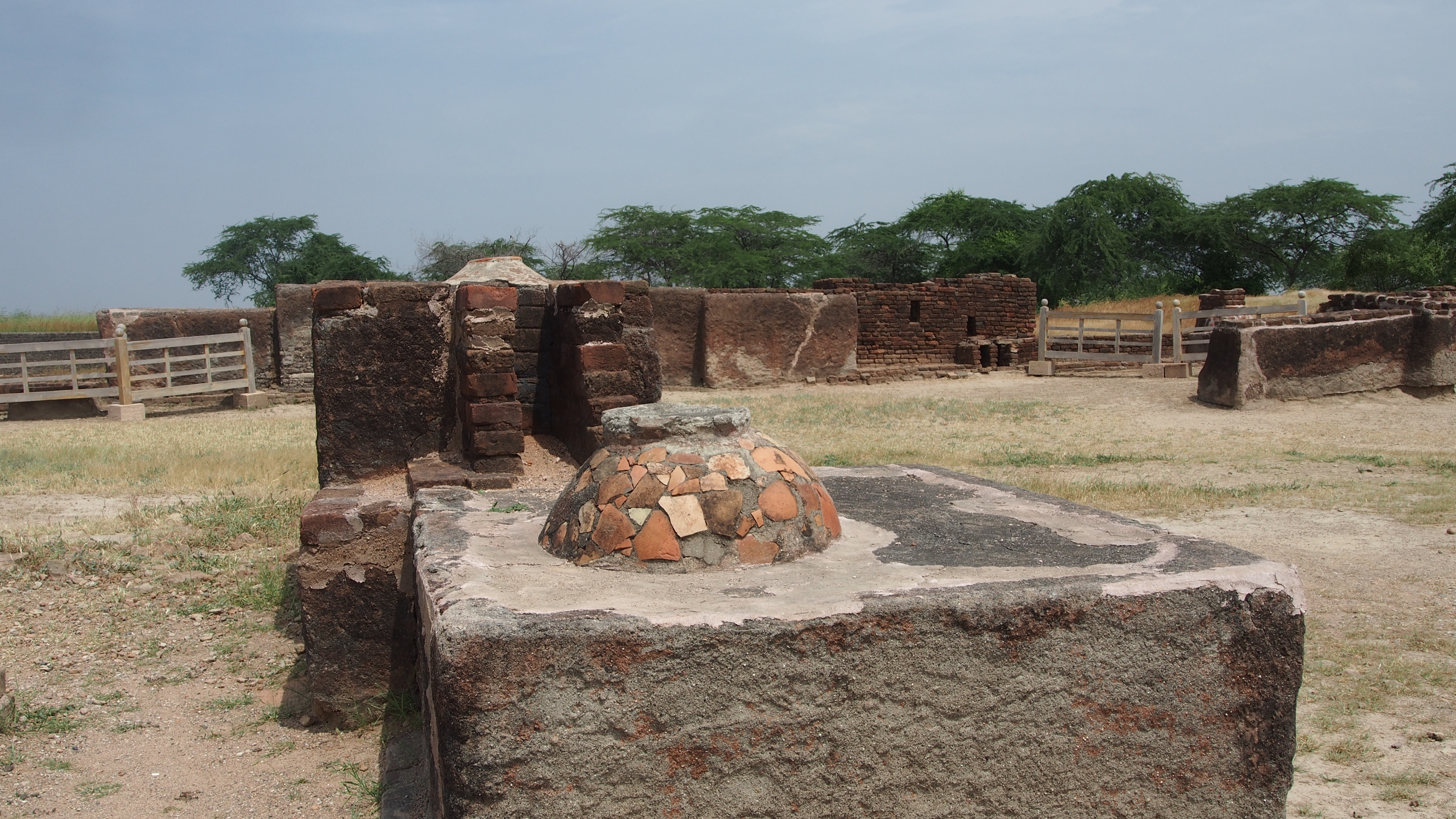
Pot furnace at Lothal

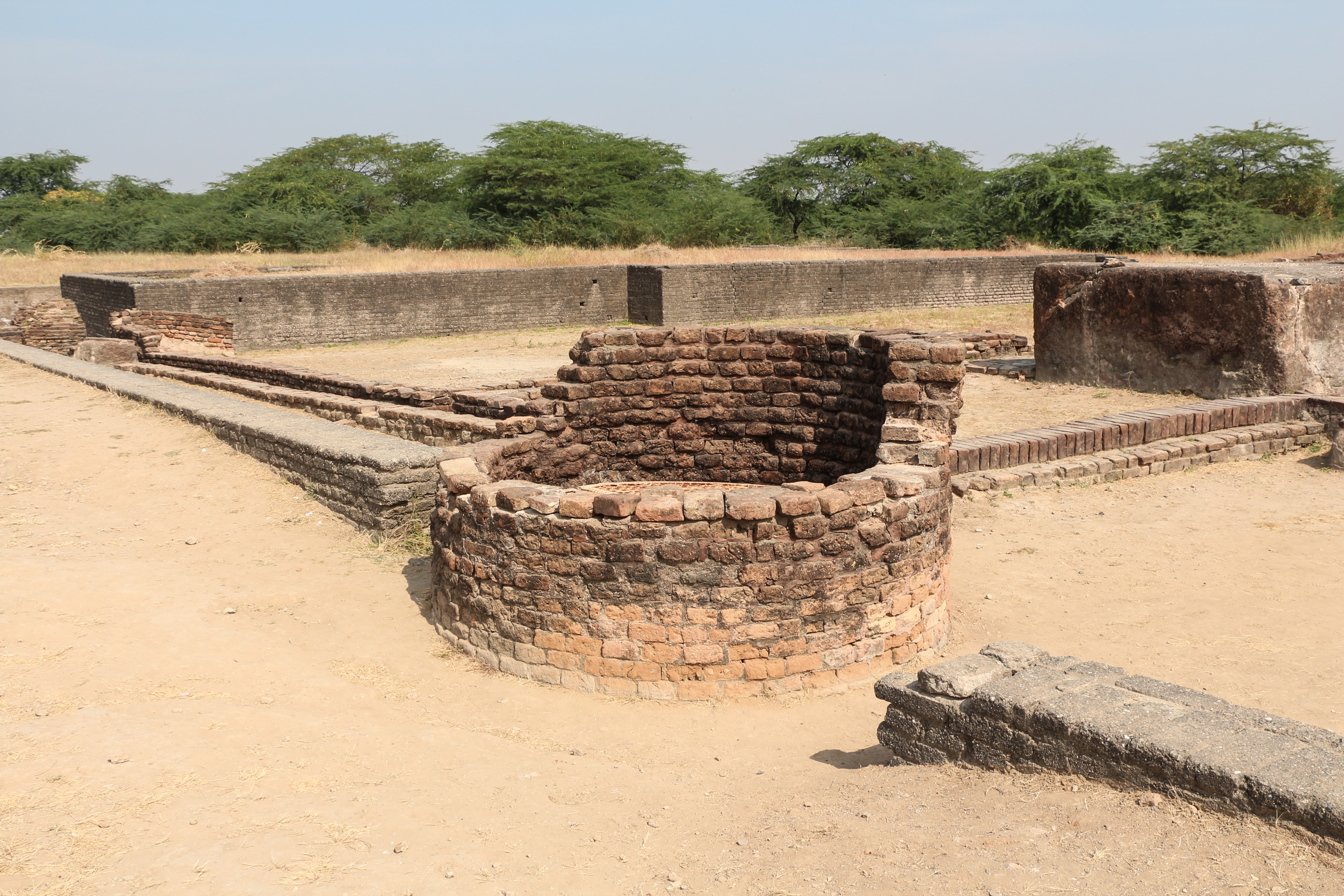
An ancient well, and the city drainage canals

The uniform organization of the town and its institutions make it evident that the Harappans were very disciplined people. Commerce and administrative duties were performed according to standards laid out. Municipal administration was strict – the width of most streets remained the same over a long time, and no encroached structures were built. Householders possessed a sump, or collection chamber to deposit solid waste in order to prevent the clogging of city drains. Drains, manholes, and cesspools deposited the waste in the river which was washed out during high tide maintaining the cleanliness of the city. A new provincial style of Harappan art and painting was pioneered. The new approaches included realistic portrayals of animals in their natural surroundings. Metalware, gold and jewellery and tastefully decorated ornaments attest to the culture and prosperity of the people of Lothal.

Most of their equipment: metal tools, weights, measures, seals, earthenware and ornaments were of the uniform standard and quality found across the Indus civilization. Lothal was a major trade centre, importing en masse raw materials like copper, chert and semi-precious stones from Mohenjo-daro and Harappa, and mass distributing to inner villages and towns. It also produced large quantities of bronze celts, fish-hooks, chisels, spears and ornaments. Lothal exported its beads, gemstones, ivory and shells. The stone blade industry catered to domestic needs—fine chert was imported from the Larkana valley or from Bijapur in modern Karnataka. Bhagatrav supplied semi-precious stones while chank shell came from Dholavira and Bet Dwarka. An intensive trade network gave the inhabitants great prosperity. The network stretched across the frontiers to Egypt, Bahrain and Sumer. One of the evidence of trade in Lothal is the discovery of typical Persian gulf seals, a circular button seal

=== Architectural development ===
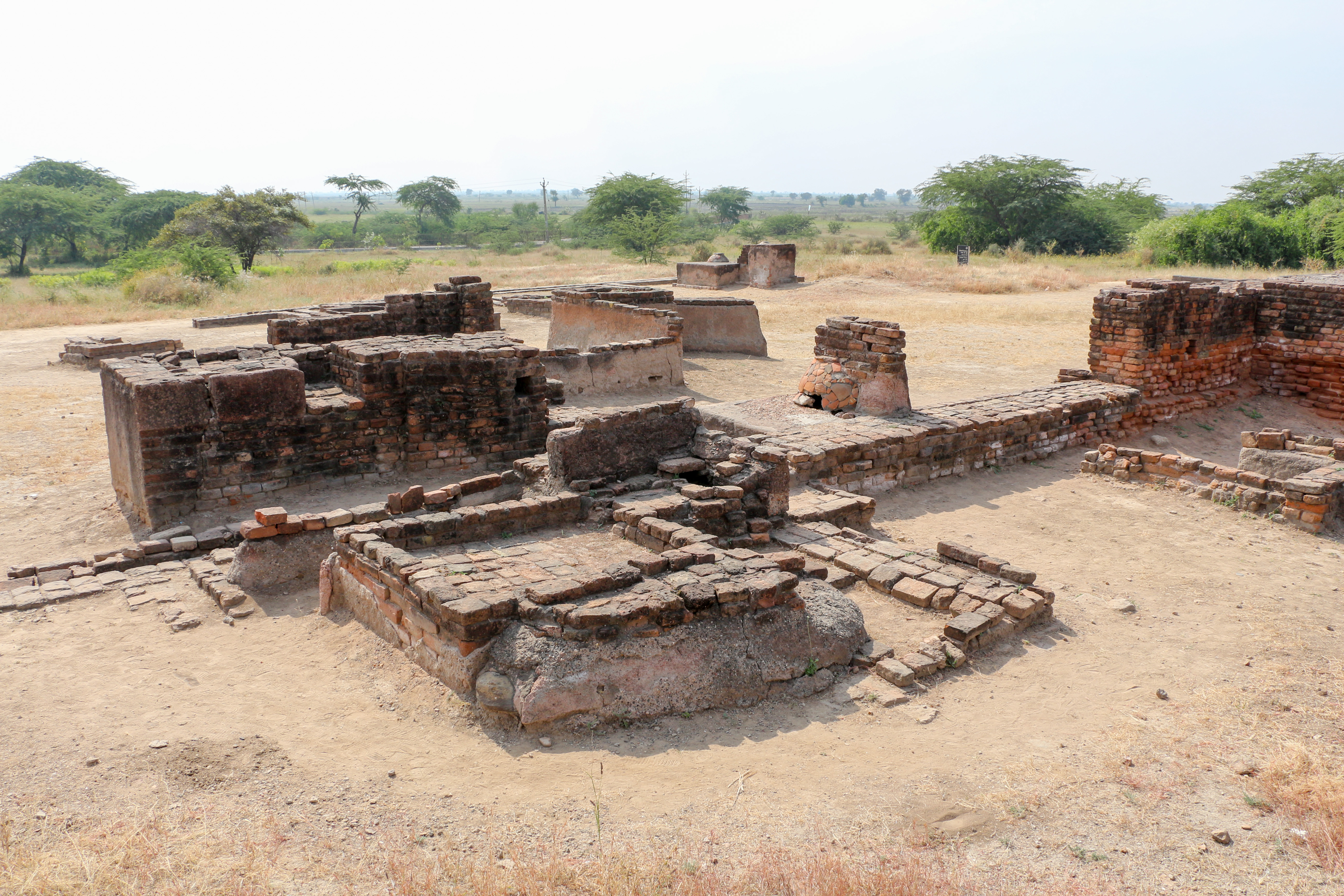
The bathroom-toilet structure of the ruler's house in Lothal

While the wider debate over the end of Indus Civilisation continues, archaeological evidence gathered by the ASI appears to point to natural catastrophes, specifically floods and storms as the source of Lothal's downfall. A powerful flood submerged the town and destroyed most of the houses, with the walls and platforms heavily damaged. The acropolis was levelled (2000–1900 BCE), and inhabited by common tradesmen and newly built makeshift houses. The worst consequence was the shift in the course of the river, cutting off access to the ships and dock. The people built a new but shallow inlet to connect the flow channel to the dock for sluicing small ships into the basin. Large ships were moored away. Houses were rebuilt, yet without removal of flood debris, which made them poor-quality and susceptible to further damage. Public drains were replaced by soakage jars. The citizens did not undertake encroachments, and rebuilt public baths. However, with a poorly organised government, and no outside agency or central government, the public works could not be properly repaired or maintained. The heavily damaged warehouse was never repaired properly, and stocks were stored in wooden canopies, exposed to floods and fire. The economy of the city was transformed. Trade volumes reduced greatly, though not catastrophically, and resources were available in lesser quantities. Independent businesses caved, allowing a merchant-centric system of factories to develop where hundreds of craftsmen worked for the same supplier and financier. The bead factory had ten living rooms and a large workplace courtyard. The coppersmith's workshop had five furnaces and paved sinks to enable multiple artisans to work.

The declining prosperity of the town, paucity of resources and poor administration increased the woes of a people pressured by consistent floods and storms. Increased salinity of soil made the land inhospitable to life, including crops. This is evidenced in adjacent cities of Rangpur, Rojdi, Rupar and Harappa in Punjab, Mohenjo-daro and Chanhudaro in Sindh. A massive flood (c. 1900 BCE) completely destroyed the flagging township in a single stroke. Archaeological analysis shows that the basin and dock were sealed with silt and debris, and the buildings razed to the ground. The flood affected the entire region of Saurashtra, Sindh and south Gujarat, and affected the upper reaches of the Indus and Sutlej, where scores of villages and townships were washed away. The population fled to inner regions.

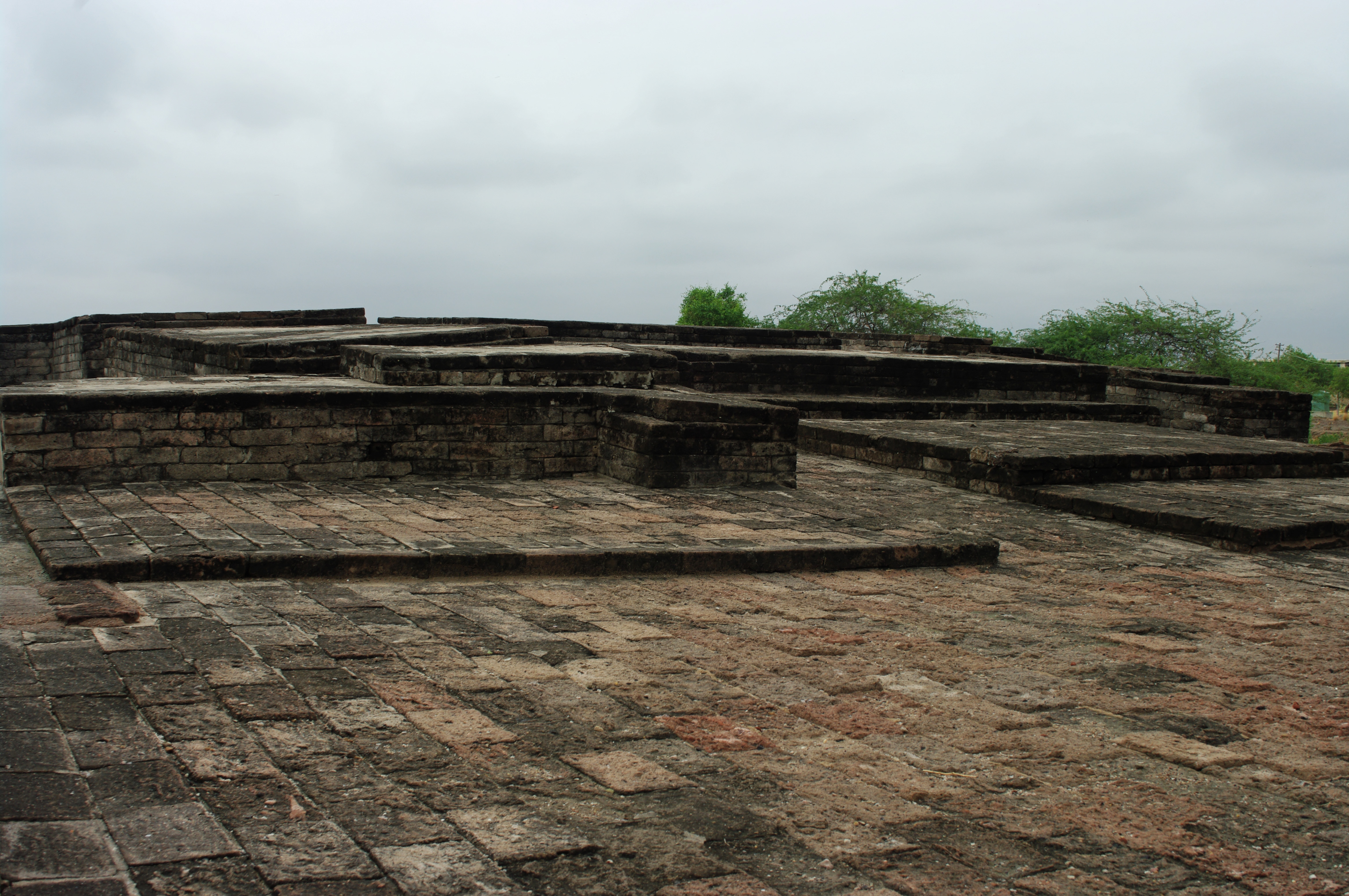
Archaeological feature

=== Later Harappan culture ===
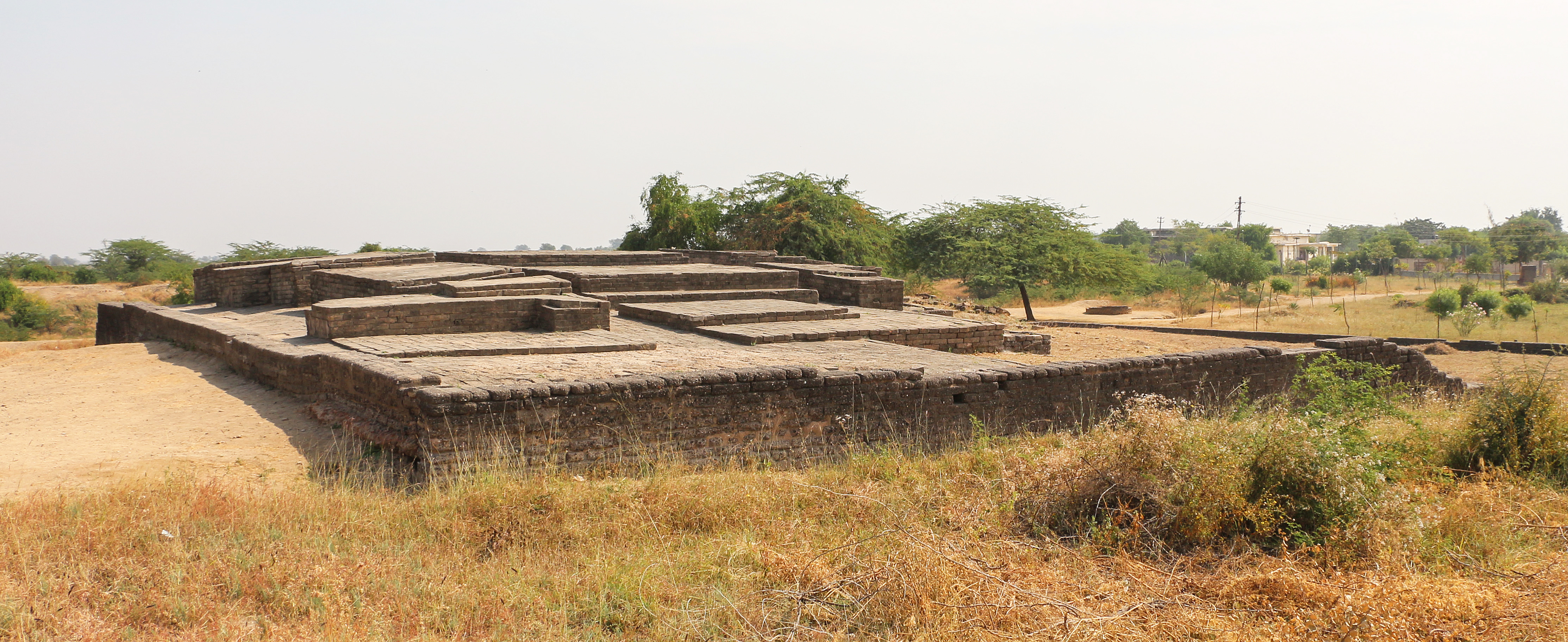
The warehouse of Lothal

Archaeological evidence shows that the site continued to be inhabited, albeit by a much smaller population devoid of urban influences. The few people who returned to Lothal could not reconstruct and repair their city, but surprisingly continued to stay and preserved religious traditions, living in poorly built houses and reed huts. That they were the Harappan peoples is evidenced by the analyses of their remains in the cemetery. While the trade and resources of the city were almost entirely gone, the people retained several Harappan ways in writing, pottery, and utensils. About this time ASI archaeologists record a mass movement of refugees from Punjab and Sindh into Saurashtra and to the valley of Sarasvati (1900–1700 BCE). Hundreds of ill-equipped settlements have been attributed to this people as Late Harappans a completely de-urbanised culture characterised by rising illiteracy, less complex economy, unsophisticated administration and poverty. Though Indus seals went out of use, the system of weights with an 8.573 gram (0.3024 oz avoirdupois) unit was retained. Between 1700 and 1600 BCE, trade would revive again. In Lothal, Harappan ceramic works of bowls, dishes and jars were mass-produced. Merchants used local materials such as chalcedony instead of chert for stone blades. Truncated sandstone weights replaced hexahedron chert weights. The sophisticated painting style reduced itself to wavy lines, loops and fronds.

== Science and engineering ==
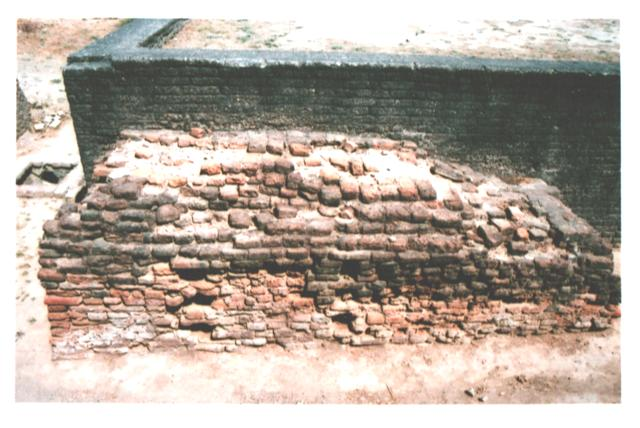
A block of bricks placed in the main drainage canal with four holes, from which the net to filter out solid waste was installed

A thick ring-like shell object found with four slits each in two margins served as a compass to measure angles on plane surfaces such as housing alignments, roads or land surveys. S.R. Rao also suggested that it could have functioned as an instrument for measuring angles and perhaps the position of stars and thus for navigation like a sextant. Lothal contributes one of three measurement scales that are integrated and linear (others found in Harappa and Mohenjodaro). An ivory scale from Lothal has the smallest-known decimal divisions in Indus civilisation. The scale is 6 millimetres (0.2 inches) thick, 15 mm (0.59 in) broad and the available length is 128 mm (5.0 in), but only 27 graduations are visible over 46 mm (1.8 in), the distance between graduation lines being 1.70 mm (0.067 in) (the small size indicates use for fine purposes). The sum total of ten graduations from Lothal is approximate to the angula in the Arthashastra. The Lothal craftsmen took care to ensure durability and accuracy of stone weights by blunting edges before polishing.

For their renowned draining system, Lothal engineers provided corbelled roofs, and an apron of kiln-fired bricks over the brick face of the platform where the sewerage entered the cesspool. Wooden screens inserted in grooves in the side drain walls held back solid waste. The well is built of radial bricks, 2.4 metres (7.9 feet) in diameter and 6.7 metres (22 feet) deep. It had an immaculate network of underground drains, silting chambers and cesspools, and inspection chambers for solid waste. The extent of drains provided archaeologists with many clues regarding the layout of streets, organisation of housing and baths. On average, the main sewer is 20–46 cm (7.9–18.1 in) in depth, with outer dimensions of 86 × 68 × 33 cm (34 × 27 × 13 in). Lothal brick-makers used a logical approach in manufacture of bricks, designed with care in regards to thickness of structures. They were used as headers and stretchers in same and alternate layers. Archaeologists estimate that in most cases, the bricks were in ratio 1:0.5:0.25 on three sides, in dimensions which were integral multiples of large graduations of Lothal scale of 25 mm (0.98 in).

== Religion ==
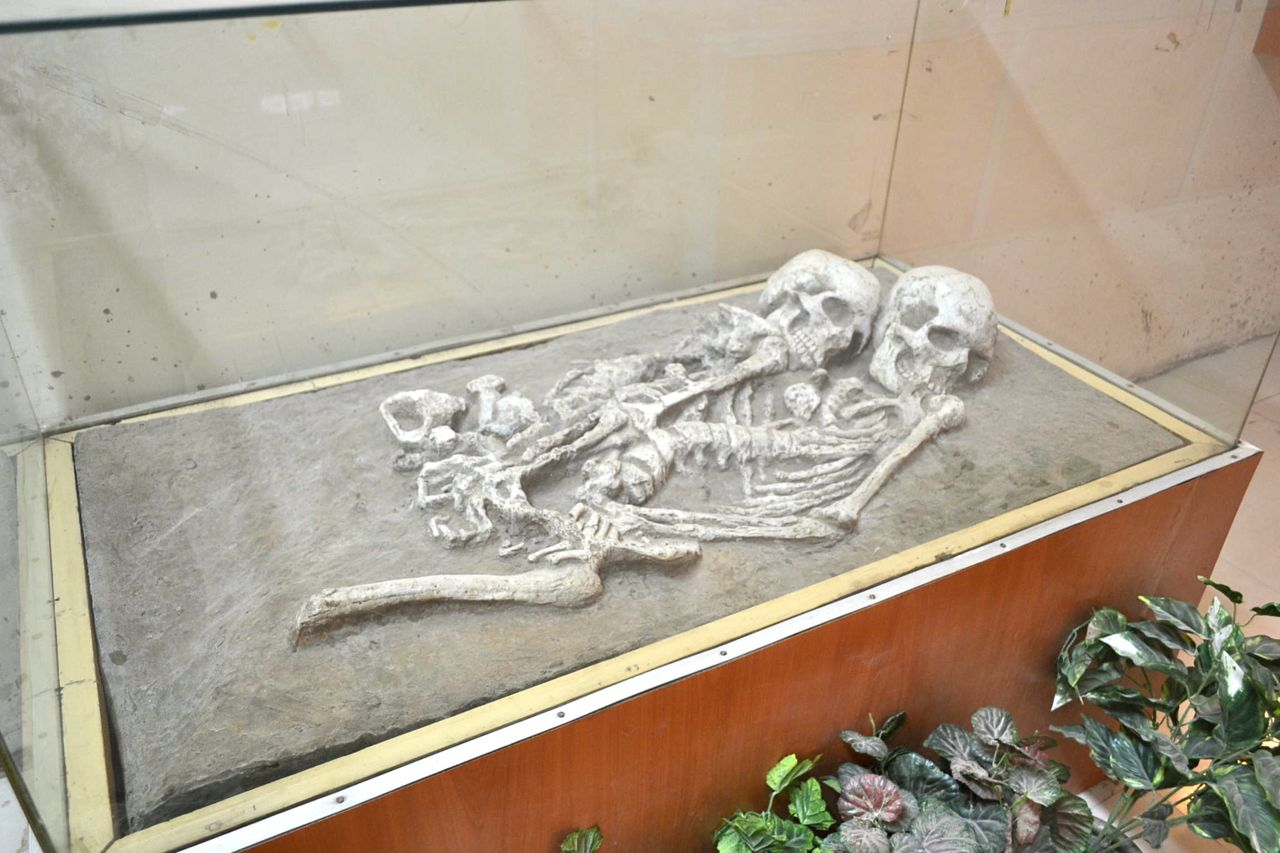
Twin burial from Lothal

The people of Lothal worshipped a fire god who is speculated to be the horned deity depicted on seals. The presence of private and public fire-altars where religious ceremonies were hosted further testifies to their spiritual beliefs. Archaeologists have discovered gold pendants, charred ashes of terra-cotta cakes and pottery, bovine remains, beads and other signs that may indicate the practice of the Gavamayana sacrifice, associated with the ancient Vedic religion. Animal worship is also evidenced, but not the worship of the Mother Goddess that is evidenced in other Harappan cities—experts consider this a sign of the existence of diversity in religious traditions. However, it is believed that a sea goddess, perhaps cognate with the general Indus-era Mother Goddess, was worshipped. Today, the local villagers likewise worship a sea goddess, Vanuvati Sikotarimata, suggesting a connection with the ancient port's traditions and historical past as an access to the sea. But the archaeologists also discovered that the practice had been given up by 2000 BCE (determined by the difference in burial times of the carbon-dated remains). It is suggested that the practice occurred only on occasion. It is also considered that given the small number of graves discovered—only 17 in an estimated population of 15,000—the citizens of Lothal also practised cremation of the dead. Post-cremation burials have been noted in other Indus sites like Harappa, Mehi and Damb-Bhuti.

=== Metallurgy and jewellery ===
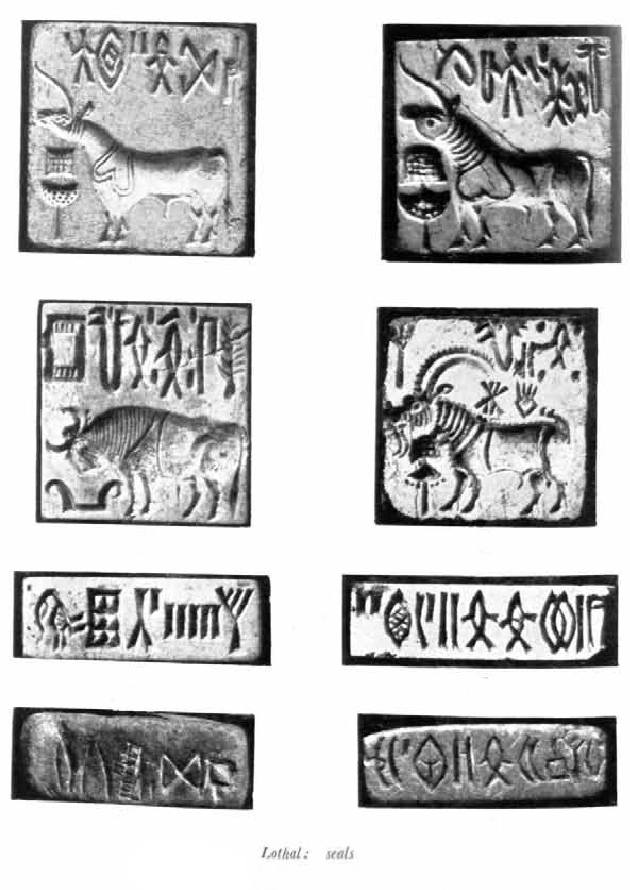
Lothal seals

Lothal copper is unusually pure, lacking the arsenic typically used by coppersmiths across the rest of the Indus valley. The city imported ingots from probable sources in the Arabian peninsula. Workers mixed tin with copper for the manufacture of celts, arrowheads, fishhooks, chisels, bangles, rings, drills, and spearheads, although weapon manufacturing was minor. They also employed advanced metallurgy in following the cire perdue technique of casting, and used more than one-piece moulds for casting birds and animals. They also invented new tools such as curved saws and twisted drills unknown to other civilisations at the time.

Lothal was one of the most important centres of production for shell-working, owing to the abundance of chank shell of high quality found in the Gulf of Kutch and near the Kathiawar coast. Gamesmen, beads, unguent vessels, chank shells, ladles and inlays were made for export and local consumption. Components of stringed musical instruments like the plectrum and the bridge were made of shell. An ivory workshop was operated under strict official supervision, and the domestication of elephants has been suggested. An ivory seal, and sawn pieces for boxes, combs, rods, inlays and ear-studs were found during excavations. Lothal produced a large quantity of gold ornaments—the most attractive item being microbeads of gold in five strands in necklaces, unique for being less than 0.25 millimetres (0.010 inches) in diameter. Cylindrical, globular and jasper beads of gold with edges at right angles resemble modern pendants used by women in Gujarat in plaits of hair. A large disc with holes recovered from a sacrificial altar is compared to the rukma worn by Vedic priests. Studs, cogwheel and heart-shaped ornaments of faience and steatite were popular in Lothal. A ring of thin copper wire turned into double spirals resembles the gold-wire rings used by modern Hindus for weddings.

=== Art ===
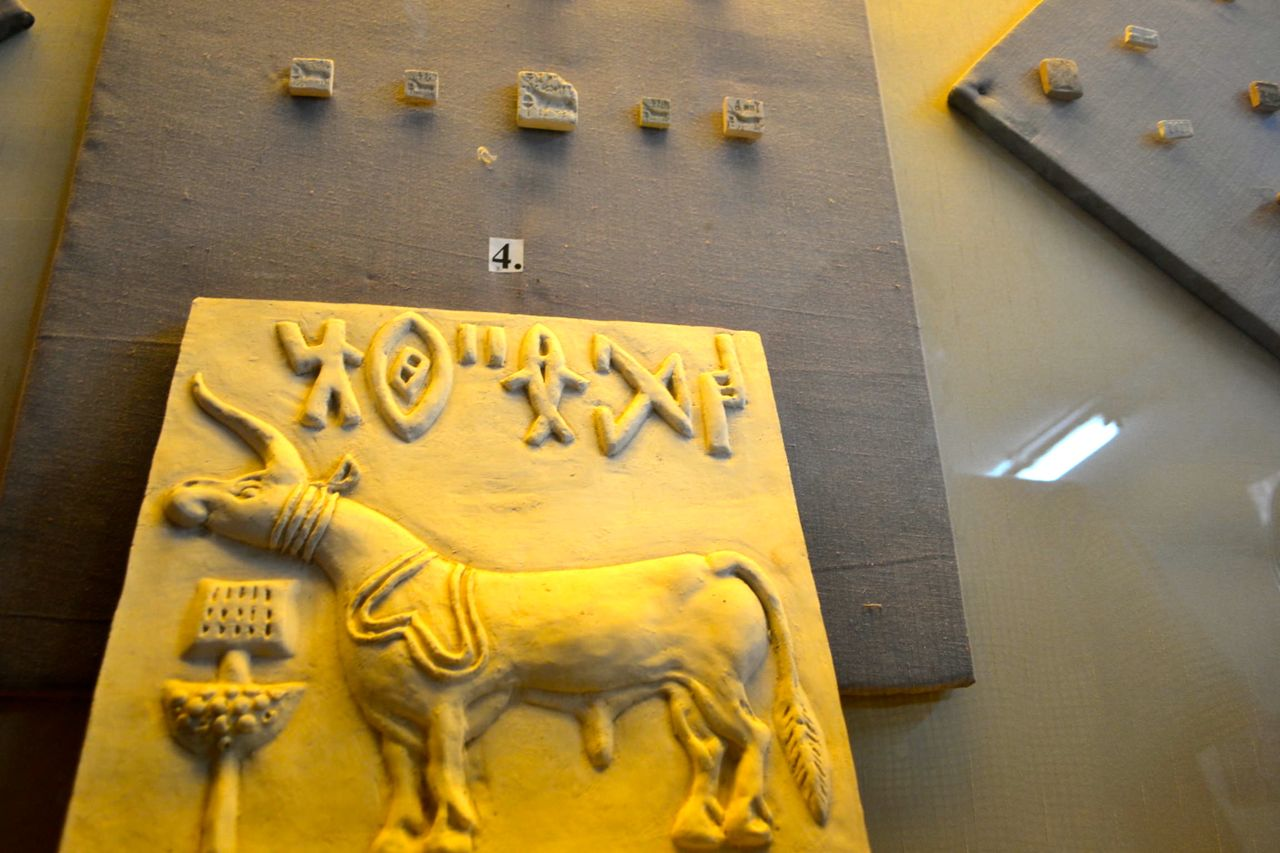
Archaeological Museum of Lothal, replica of seal

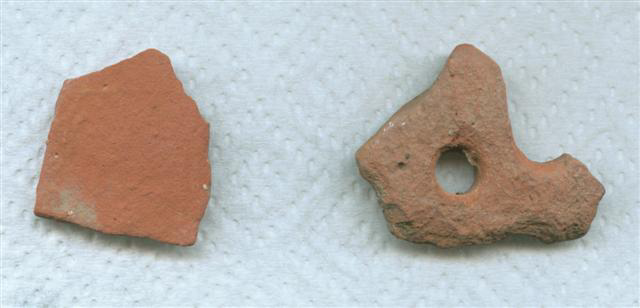
Pieces of red clay pottery

The discovery of etched carnelian beads and non-etched barrel beads in Kish and Ur (modern Iraq), Jalalabad (Afghanistan) and Susa (Iran) attest to the popularity of the Indus bead industry across West Asia. The lapidaries select stones of variegated colours, producing beads of different shapes and sizes. The methods of Lothal bead-makers were so advanced that no improvements have been noted over 4,000 years—modern makers in the Khambhat area follow the same technique. Double-eye beads of agate and collared or gold-capped beads of jasper and carnelian beads are among those attributed as uniquely from Lothal. It was very famous for micro-cylindrical beads of steatite (chlorite). The Lothal excavation yielded 213 seals, third in volume amongst all Indus sites. Seal-cutters preferred short-horned bulls, mountain goats, tigers and composite animals like the elephant-bull for engravings. There is a short inscription of intaglio in almost every seal. Stamp seals with inserted copper rings in a perforated button were used to seal the cargo with impressions of packing materials like mats, twisted cloth, and cords. These seals were only verified at Lothal. Quantitative descriptions along with seals of rulers and owners were stamped on goods. A unique seal found here is from Bahrain—circular, with motif of a dragon flanked by jumping gazelles.

Lothal offers two new types of pottery, a convex bowl with or without stud handle and a small jar with flaring rim, both of which were found in the micaceous Red Ware period and not in contemporary Indus cultures. Lothal artists introduced a new form of realistic painting. Paintings depict animals in their natural surroundings. On one large vessel, the artist depicts birds with fish in their beaks, resting in a tree, while a fox-like animal stands below. This scene bears resemblance to the story of The Fox and the Crow in the Panchatantra. Artistic imagination is also suggested via careful portrayals—for example, several birds with legs aloft in the sky suggest flight, while half-opened wings suggest imminent flight. On a miniature jar, the story of the thirsty crow and deer is depicted – of how the deer could not drink from the narrow-mouth of the jar, while the crow succeeded by dropping stones in the jar. The features of the animals are clear and graceful. Movements and emotions are suggested by the positioning of limbs and facial features—in a 15 cm × 5 cm (5.9 in × 2.0 in) jar without overcrowding.

A complete set of terra-cotta gamesmen, has been found in Lothal—animal figures, pyramids with ivory handles and castle-like objects (similar to the chess set of Queen Hatshepsut in Egypt). The realistic portrayal of human beings and animals suggests a careful study of anatomical and natural features. The bust of a male with slit eyes, sharp nose, and square-cut beard is reminiscent of Sumerian figures, especially stone sculptures from Mari. In images of men and women, muscular and physical features are sharp, prominently marked. Terra-cotta models also identify the differences between species of dogs and bulls, including those of horses. Animal figures with wheels and a movable head may have been utilised as toys.

=== Cultivation and Diet ===
Rice was the major food crop but Ragi, jowar was also popular in lothal. Various types of lentils were also part of the diet. The bones of many animals including domesticated and wild give the indication of a wide food culture.

== Excavated Lothal ==
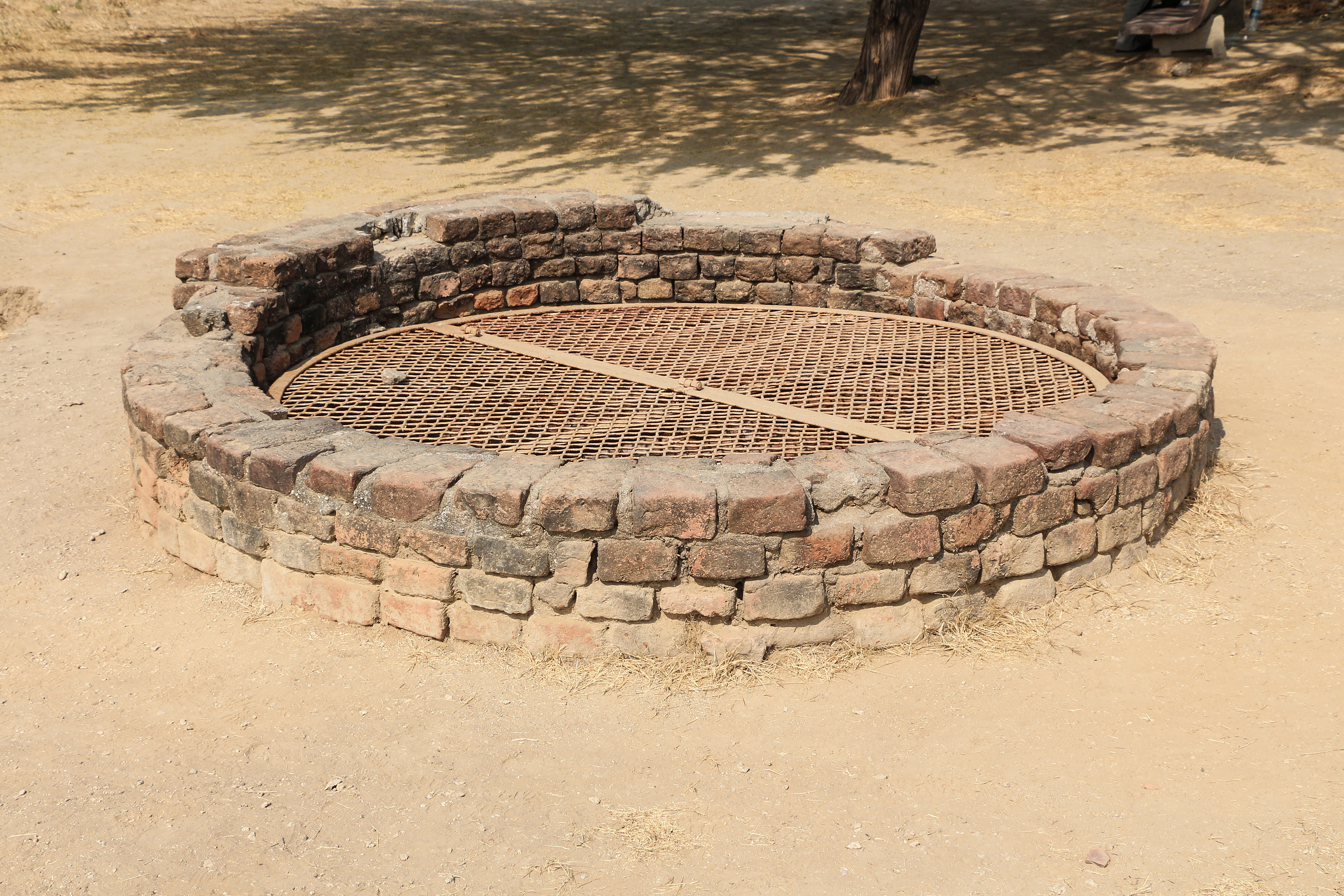
The main well

On plan, Lothal stands 285 metres (935 feet) north-to-south and 228 metres (748 feet) east-to-west. At the height of its habitation, it covered a wider area since remains have been found 300 metres (980 feet) south of the mound. Due to the fragile nature of unbaked bricks and frequent floods, the superstructures of all buildings have receded. However, the dwarfed walls, platforms, two wells, drains, and paved bathing platforms are visible. The dock walls were also preserved beyond the great deluge (c.1900 BCE) due to the loam that was deposited by persistent floods. Erosion and brick robbery are responsible for the absence of high standing walls as well as the ancient nullah, inlet channel, and riverbed. The flood-damaged peripheral wall of mud-bricks is visible near the warehouse area. The remnants of the north–south sewer are burnt bricks in the cesspool. Cubical blocks of the warehouse on a high platform are also visible.

The ASI has covered the peripheral walls, the wharf, and many houses of the early phase with earth to protect from natural phenomena, but the entire archaeological site is nevertheless facing grave concerns about necessary preservation. Salinity ingress and prolonged exposure to the rain and sun are gradually eating away the remains of the site. Heavy rain in the region has damaged the remains of the sun-dried mud brick constructions. Stagnant rain water has lathered the brick and mud work with layers of moss. Due to siltation, the dockyard's draft has been reduced by 3–4 metres (9.8–13.1 ft) and saline deposits are decaying the bricks. Officials blame the salinity on capillary action and point out that cracks are emerging and foundations weakening even as restoration work slowly progresses.

== Dockyard ==
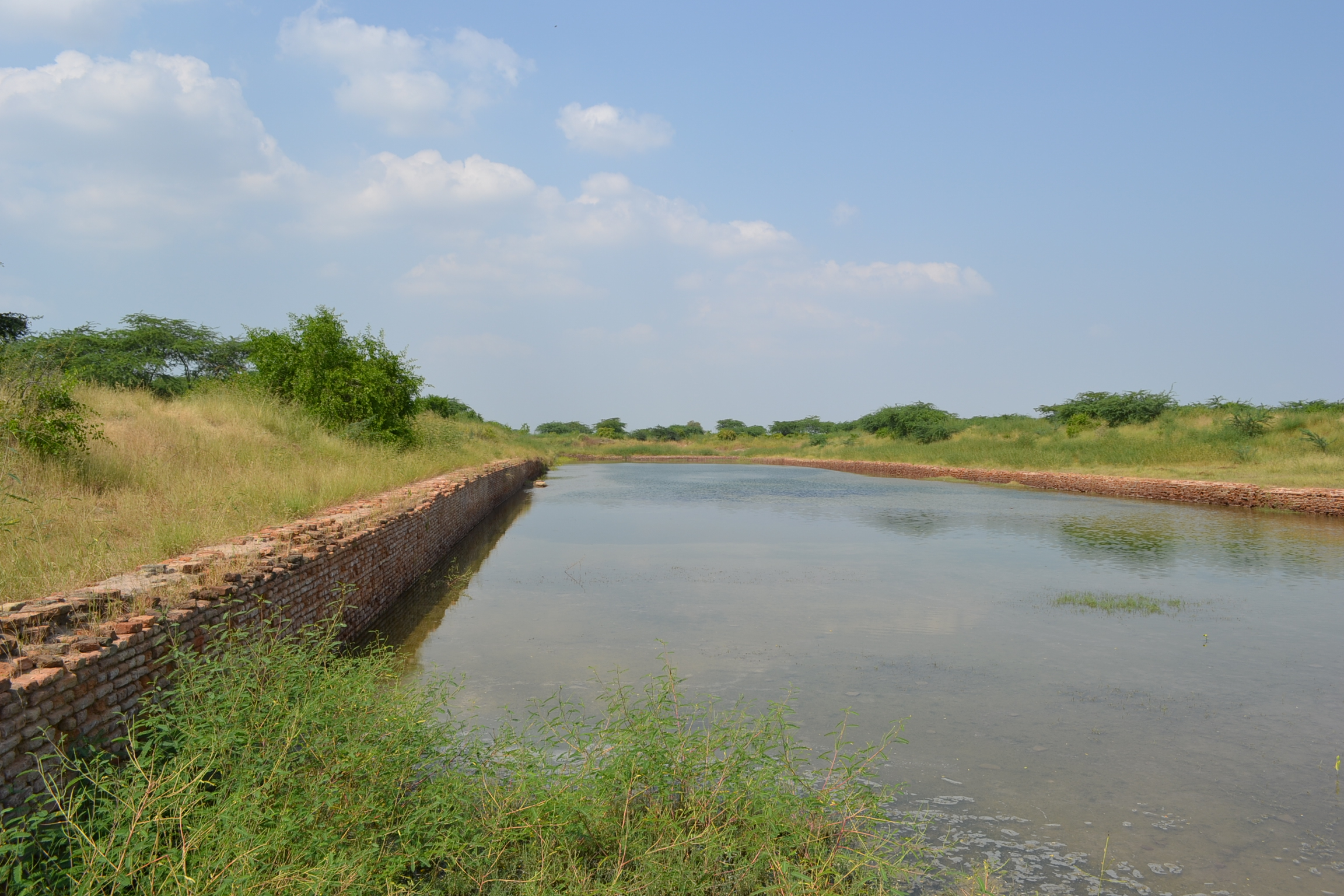
The dock, with a canal opening to allow water to flow into the river, thereby maintaining a stable water level

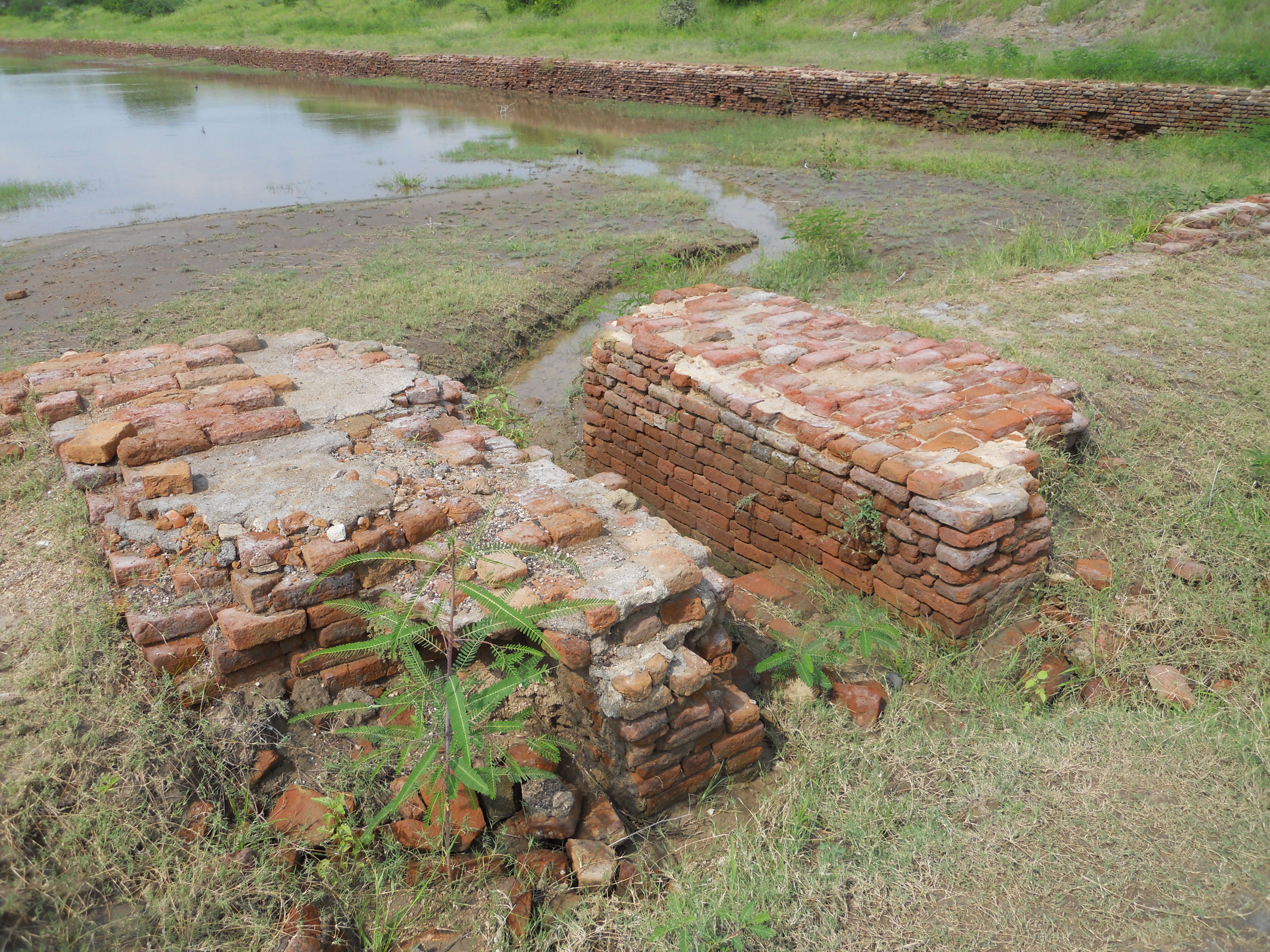
Remains of, meter square, sluice gate, south face, built with burnt bricks

The trapezoidal, burn brick, structure is located on the east of the town and away from the main river channel, to possibly avoid deposition of silt. The north–south length averages 215 metres (705 feet), and east–west width of 35 metres (115 feet). An inlet approximately 7 metres (23 ft) wide and 0.9 metres (3.0 ft) in depth survives in the north of the structure, and a 1 metre (3.3 ft) square sluice gate or spillway, that appears could have been dammed by a wooden gate, exists in the south face of the structure. When the river changed its course in 2000 BCE, a canal approximately 7 metres (23 feet) wide and 2 kilometres (1.2 miles) long, was dug to the new river course.

Facilitating the movement of cargo was a mudbrick wharf, 220 metres (720 feet) long, built on the western arm of the dock, with a ramp leading to the warehouse and acropolis, built on a packed mud platform, original 4.26 metres (14.0 feet) in height (Now it is 3.35 metres or 11.0 feet.) on the south western flank of the basin. The warehouse was originally built on sixty-four cubical blocks, 3.6 metres (12 feet) square, with 1.2-metre (3.9-foot) passages, and based on a 3.5-metre (11-foot) mud-brick podium. The pedestal was very high to provide maximum protection from floods. Brick-paved passages between blocks served as vents, and a direct ramp led to the dock to facilitate loading. The warehouse was located close to the acropolis, to allow tight supervision by ruling authorities. Despite elaborate precautions, the major floods that brought the city's decline destroyed all but twelve blocks, which became the makeshift storehouse.

Rao's identification of basin as a dock was challenged by Leshnik in 1968 and later Yule in 1982, who offered an alternative assessment of the feature as primarily an irrigation tank. In their assessment the dimensions of the "inlet" are not large enough to accommodate the draft of ocean going vessels, with inland craft having to be used to ferry goods to ocean going vessels birthed elsewhere. The identification of just two wells in the town, one on the southern edge of the dock and the other on the acropolis, were also offered to support the alternative primary purpose, as a tank to irrigate vegetables in the adjoining fields, a place to bathe, and a quay to unload river boats.

Researchers from the National Institute of Oceanography in Goa discovered foraminifera... (marine microfossils) and salt, gypsum crystals (due to evapouration of seawater) in the rectangular structure clearly indicating that sea water once filled the structure, though Leshnik argued these could have been left through flood events.

The purpose of the 5 stone weights found around the basin, as to whether they were anchors or Shadoof weights has also been debated, as have the source of the estuarine shells from the dock, 5 terracotta models of boats and a circular Persian Gulf seal from Bahrain.

It is speculated that Lothal engineers studied tidal movements, and their effects on brick-built structures, since the walls are of kiln-burnt bricks. This knowledge also enabled them to select Lothal's location in the first place, as the Gulf of Khambhat has the highest tidal amplitude and ships can be sluiced through flow tides in the river estuary.

The main inlet is 12.8 metres (42 feet) wide, and another is provided on the opposite side. To counter the thrust of water, offsets were provided on the outer wall faces. At high tide flow of 2.1–2.4 metres (6.9–7.9 ft) of water would have allowed ships to enter. Provision was made for the escape of excess water through the outlet channel, 96.5 metres (317 feet) wide and 1.7 metres (5.6 feet) high in the southern arm.

There was an important public building opposite to the warehouse whose superstructure has completely disappeared. Throughout their time, the city had to brace itself through multiple floods and storms. Dock and city peripheral walls were maintained efficiently. The town's zealous rebuilding ensured the growth and prosperity of the trade. However, with rising prosperity, Lothal's people failed to upkeep their walls and dock facilities, possibly as a result of over-confidence in their systems. A flood of moderate intensity in 2050 BCE exposed some serious weaknesses in the structure, but the problems were not addressed properly.

== Acropolis and lower town ==
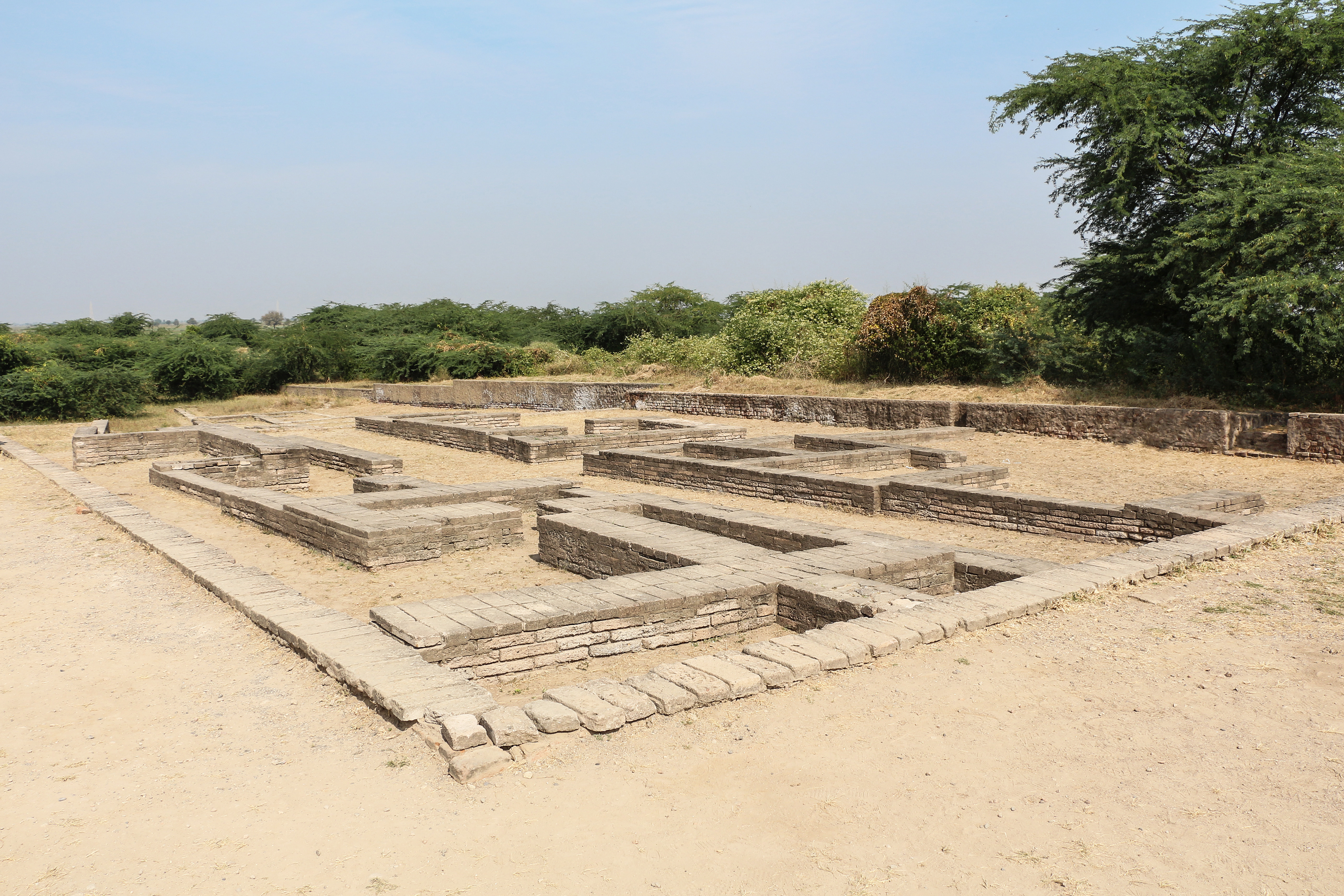
The lower town

The town center of Acropolis was the political and commercial heart of Lothal measuring at 127.4 metres (418 feet) east-to-west by 60.9 metres (200 feet) north-to-south. There were three streets and two lanes running east–west, and two streets running north–south. The four sides of the rectangular platform on which houses were built are formed by mud-brick structures of 12.2–24.4 metres (40–80 ft) thickness and 2.1–3.6 metres (6.9–11.8 ft) high. The identified bathing platforms are located in the acropolis, and part of mostly two-roomed houses with open courtyards. The bricks used for paving the bathing platforms were polished to prevent seepage. The pavements were lime-plastered, and edges were wainscoted (wooden panels) by thin walls. The ruler's residence was 43.92 square metres (472.8 square feet) and hosted a 1.8 square metres (19 square feet) bathing platform with contiguous squat latrine which was also connected to an outside drain that discharged into the dock. The lower town marketplace was on the main north–south street 6–8 metres (20–26 ft) wide. Built in straight rows on either side of the street are residences and workshops, although brick-built drains and early period housing has now disappeared. The street maintained a uniform width and did not undergo encroachment during the reconstructive periods after deluges. There are multiple two-roomed shops and workplaces of coppersmiths and blacksmiths.

The bead factory, which performs a very important economic function, possesses a central courtyard and eleven rooms, a store, and a guardhouse. There is a cinder dump as well as a double-chambered circular kiln with stoke-holes for fuel supply. Four flues are connected with each other, the upper chamber and the stokehold. The mud plaster of the floors and walls are vitrified owing to intense heat during work. The remnants of raw materials such as reed, cow dung, sawdust, and agate are found, giving archaeologists hints of how the kiln was operated. A large mud-brick building faces the factory, and its significance is noted by its plan. Four large rooms and a hall, with an overall measurement of 17.1 by 12.8 metres (56 ft × 42 ft). The hall has a large doorway and a raised floor in the southern corner of the building.

== Trade ==
A coastal route may have existed linking sites such as Lothal and Dholavira to Sutkagan Dor on the Makran coast. Lothal also had trade relations with the Sumerian civilization.

== See also ==
- List of Indus Valley Civilisation sites
- Bhagatrav, a small port
- Rangpur, Gujarat, a sea port
- National Maritime Heritage Complex, a tourism complex under construction near Lothal
