= Rishi Kumar Behl =

Indian scientist, professor, and author

R. K. Behl
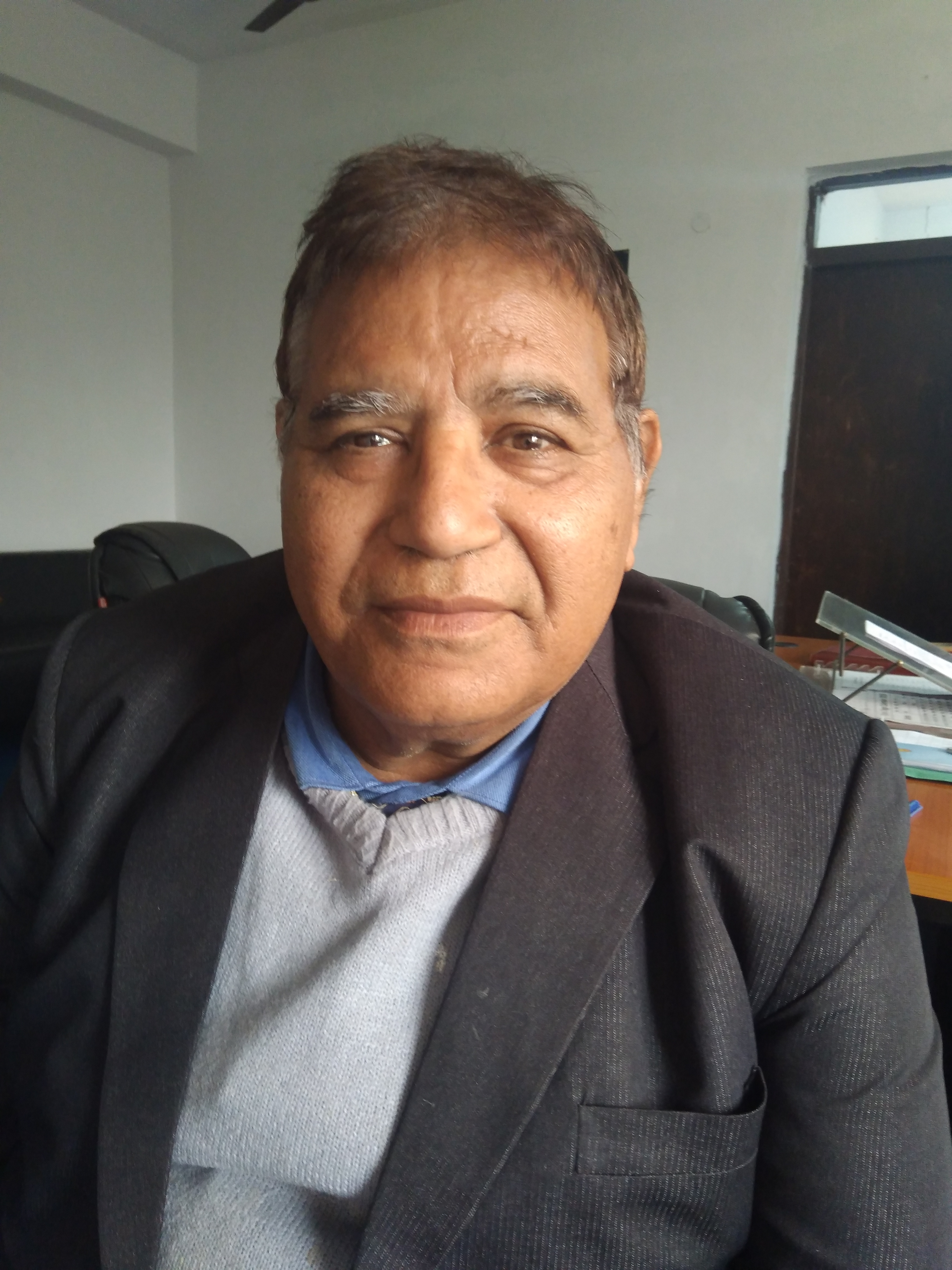

Scientist

Personal details
- Born: 15 May 1951 Date of Death= 06.11.2025 Hanumangarh, Rajasthan, India
- Education: Chaudhary Charan Singh Haryana Agricultural University
- Profession: professor Author

Rishi Kumar Behl (born 15 May 1951) is an Indian scientist, professor, and author.

He is former director, Universal Institute of Technology, Hansi, Hisar, Associate Dean in College of Agriculture, Chaudhary Charan Singh Haryana Agricultural University. He is General Secretary of International Foundation for Sustainable Development in Africa and Asia, Germany. He is presently working in Maharishi Markandeshwar University, Mullana.

== Education and career ==
BSc (Agri, 1972) from Rajasthan University, Jaipur, MSc (Agri, Plant Breeding, 1974) and PhD (Genetics, 1980) from Haryana Agriculture, university, Hisar, India. He received advance training in Plant Breeding at University of Goettingen, Germany between 1982 and 1984. He served CCS Haryana Agricultural University, Hisar between 1978 and 2011 Department of Genetics and Plant Breeding and then as Associate Dean, College of Agriculture. He has worked as Director, New Initiatives at Manav Institute, Jevra in Hisar. He has also worked in Jagan Nath University, NCR as a Dean of Faculty of Sciences.

== Activities ==
He is founder secretary and now president of International Council of Sustainable Agriculture (ICSA). He is founder Member Secretary of SSARM (Society for Sustainable Agriculture and Resource Management), India.

He participated in and organized several international conferences in India and abroad.

He has been also member of various editorial boards, including editor in chief of Annals of Biology for about three decades, associate editor of Annals of Agri Bio Research, editorial board member of Archives of Agronomy and Soil Science Germany, international advisory board member of Tropics Japan, associate editor, Cereal Research Communication Hungary, associate editor, South Pacific Journal of Natural Science Fiji, senior editor, Journal of Basic Microbiology, Germany, and has about 200 publications in international and national journals and 30 edited books and manuals to his credit.

He is editor of various books and manuals. A few books are as under-

- Vistas in Computer Aided Agri-Bio-Engineering Technologies
- Biotechnology and Plant Breeding Perspectives
- Crop Science and Technology for Food Secrurity [sic], Bioenergy and Sustainability
- Crop Science and Land Use for Food and Bioenergy
- Resource Management Towards Sustainable Agriculture and Development
- Rishi Kumar Behl, ed. (2014). Cutting Edge Science an Technologies towards Food, Environment and Health (First ed.). Agrobios (International). ISBN 978-9381191033.
- Behl, R. K; Maherchandani, N; Haryana Agricultural University; Plant Science Colloquium; Regional Seminar on Innovative Ideas in Plant Research, eds. (1990). Trends in crop improvement. Hisar, India: P.S.D.S. Printers. OCLC 35503440..
- Behl, R. K; Arora, S. K; Tauro, P, eds. (1994). Impact of modern agriculture on environment: proceedings of Indo-German conference on impact of modern agriculture on environment, December 1–3, 1993. Hisar: CCS Haryana Agricultural University. OCLC 66891687.
- Behl, R. K; Chhabra, A. K, eds. (2003). Enhancing production and food value of plants: genetic options. Hisar: SSARM. ISBN 978-81-87267-05-8. OCLC 240207895..
- Behl, R. K; Asif, A. R. Ed; et al., eds. (2014). Cutting edge science and technologies for food, environment and health. Jodhpur: Agrobios (International). ISBN 978-93-81191-03-3. OCLC 1193076467..
- Behl, R. K, ed. (2012). Crop science and technology for food security, bioenergy and sustainability. Jodhpur: Agrobios (International). ISBN 978-93-81191-00-2. OCLC 821155430..
- Behl, R. K; Kubat, J; Kleynhans, T (2007). Resource management towards stainable agriculture and development. Jodhpur: Agrobios. ISBN 978-81-904309-7-5. OCLC 663930785..
- Behl, R. K; Khurana, A. L; Dogra, R. C, eds. (1995). Plant microbe interaction in sustainable agriculture. Hisar: Bio Science Publ. OCLC 176912668..
- Behl, R. K, ed. (2009). Sustainable agriculture for food, bio-energy and livelihood security: proceeding of the International Conference on Sustainable Agriculture for Food, Bio-Energy and Livelihood Security, February 14–16, 2007. Jodhpur: Agrobios (International). ISBN 978-81-904309-6-8. OCLC 463396789..
- Behl, R. K; Merbach, W; Meliczek, H; Kaletsch, C (2010). Crop science and land use for food and bioenergy. Jodhpur: Agrobios. ISBN 978-81-904309-8-2. OCLC 665194075.
- El Bassam, Nasir; Behl, R. K; Prochnow, B, eds. (1998). Sustainable agriculture for food, energy and industry: strategies towards achievement : proceedings of the international conference held in Braunschweig, Germany, June 1997. London: James & James Science Publishers. ISBN 978-1-873936-76-4. OCLC 40649620..
