= Landon Bahl =

American politician

Member of the North Dakota House of Representatives from the 17th district
- Incumbent
- Assumed office December 1, 2022 Serving with Mark Sanford
- Succeeded by: Reed Johnson (elect)

Personal details
- Party: Republican
- Education: University of North Dakota (BA)

Landon Bahl is an American politician. He is serving as a member of the North Dakota House of Representatives from the 17th district, alongside Mark Sanford. He is a member of the Republican Party.

A native of Minot, North Dakota, Bahl obtained a bachelor's degree in entrepreneurship and marketing from the University of North Dakota in 2016, where he was a member of Delta Tau Delta.
