= Jitin Bahl =

English cricketer

Personal information
- Full name: Jitin Bahl
- Born: 16 October 1975 (age 51); Hammersmith, London, England
- Batting: Right-handed
- Role: Wicket-keeper
- Relatives: dimple bahl

Career statistics
Competition	First-class	List A
Matches	1	5
Runs scored	0	1
Batting average	–	0.50
100s/50s	–/–	–/–
Top score	0*	1*
Catches/stumpings	1/–	2/–
- Source: Cricinfo, 19 June 2019

Jitin Bahl (born 16 October 1975) is a former English first-class cricketer.

While studying at university, Bahl made a single appearance in first-class cricket for the British Universities cricket team against the touring Indians at Fenner's in 1996. In that same season he appeared in five List A one-day matches for the British Universities team in the Benson & Hedges Cup.
